= 1976 United States Senate elections =

- November 2, 1976
- Class 1

33 of the 100 seats in the United States Senate 51 seats needed for a majority
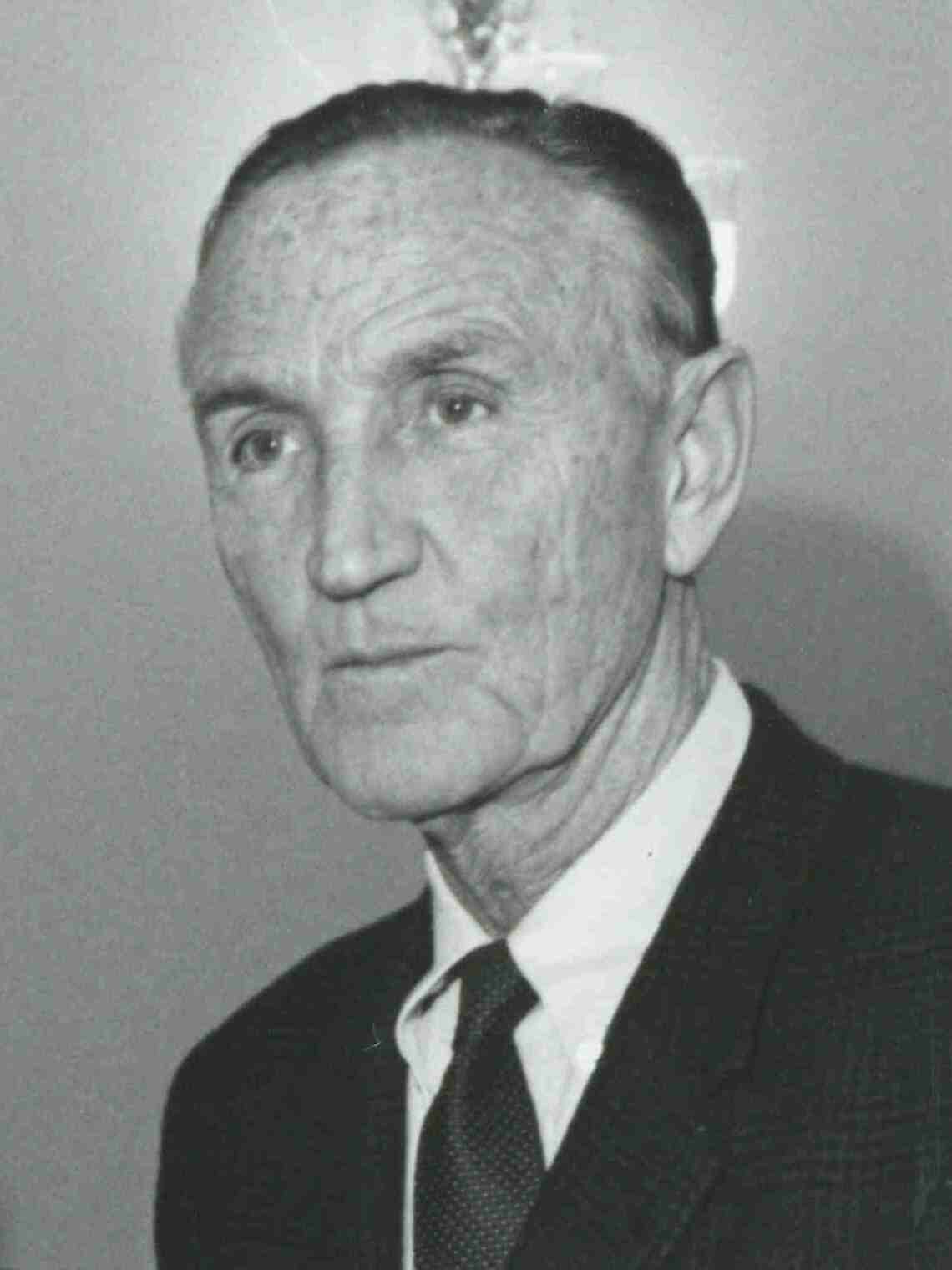

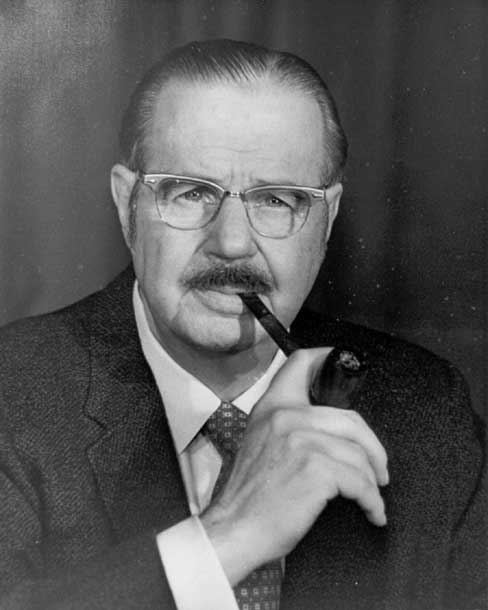
	Majority party	Minority party
Leader	Mike Mansfield (retired)	Hugh Scott (retired)
Party	Democratic	Republican
Leader since	January 3, 1961	September 24, 1969
Leader's seat	Montana	Pennsylvania
Seats before	61	37
Seats after	61	38
Seat change	Steady	▲1
Popular vote	31,790,526 (Note: The Liberal Party and Conservative Party in New York respectively endorsed Daniel Patrick Moynihan and James L. Buckley, but the Clerk of the U.S. House of Representatives did not tabulate their votes, respectively totaling 184,083 and 311,494, into the national Democratic and Republican total.)	24,562,431
Percentage	53.7%	41.5%
Seats up	21	10
Races won	21	11
	Third party	Fourth party
Party	Independent	Conservative
Seats before	1	1
Seats after	1 (Note: Harry F. Byrd Jr. (VA) was an independent who caucused with the Democrats. In some circles he is called an "Independent Democrat," but his registration was listed as "Independent." See, e.g., United States Congress. "Harry Flood Byrd Jr. (id: B001209)". Biographical Directory of the United States Congress.)	0
Seat change	Steady	▼1
Popular vote	890,778	311,494
Seats up	1	1
Races won	1	0
- Results of the elections: Democratic gain Republican gain Democratic hold Republican hold Independent hold No election
Majority Leader before election
Mike Mansfield
Democratic
Elected Majority Leader
Robert Byrd
Democratic

The 1976 United States Senate elections was an election for the United States Senate. Held on November 2, the 33 seats of Class 1 were contested in regular elections. They coincided with Democrat Jimmy Carter's presidential election and the United States Bicentennial celebration. Although almost half of the seats decided in this election changed parties, Carter's narrow victory did not provide coattails for the Democratic Party. Each party flipped seven Senate seats, although one of the seats flipped by Democrats was previously held by a Conservative.

This was the first election in which the Libertarian Party competed, running candidates in 9 of the 33 contested seats. As of 2026 this is the first and so far only time that both party leaders retired from the Senate in the same election cycle since the creation of the positions. This is the last time that Democrats or any party won a 60% supermajority via direct elections (though Democrats briefly held one in the autumn and winter of 2009).

== Results summary ==
↓
61	1	38
Democratic	I	Republican

Parties					Total
Parties	Democratic	Republican	Independent	Other	Total
Last elections (1974) Before these elections	61	37	1	1	100
Not up	40	27	0	0	67
Up Class 1 (1970→1976)	21	10	1	1	33
Incumbent retired	5	3	0	0	8
Held by same party	2	1	—	—	3
Replaced by other party	▼3 Republicans replaced by ▲3 Democrats ▼2 Democrats replaced by ▲2 Republicans		—	—	5
Result	6	2	—	—	8
Incumbent ran	16	7	1	1	25
Won re-election	11	4	1	0	16
Lost re-election	▼3 Republicans replaced by ▲3 Democrats ▼1 Conservative replaced by ▲1 Democrat ▼5 Democrats replaced by ▲5 Republicans				9
Lost renomination, but held by same party	0	0	0	0	0
Result	15	9	1	0	25
Total elected	21	11	1	0	33
Net gain/loss	Steady	▲1	Steady	▼1	1
Nationwide vote	31,790,526	24,562,431	1,173,414	1,647,636	59,174,007
Share	53.72%	41.51%	1.98%	2.78%	100%
Result	61	38	1	0	100

Source: "Statistics of the Presidential and Congressional Election of November 2, 1976" (PDF). U.S. Government Printing Office.

== Gains, losses, and holds ==
=== Retirements ===
Four Republicans and four Democrats retired instead of seeking re-election.

State	Senator	Replaced by
Arizona	Paul Fannin	Dennis DeConcini
Hawaii	Hiram Fong	Spark Matsunaga
Michigan	Philip Hart	Donald Riegle
Missouri	Stuart Symington	John Danforth
Montana	Mike Mansfield	John Melcher
Nebraska	Roman Hruska	Edward Zorinsky
Pennsylvania	Hugh Scott	John Heinz
Rhode Island	John Pastore	John Chafee

=== Defeats ===
Three Republicans, five Democrats, and one Conservative sought re-election but lost in the general election.

State	Senator	Replaced by
California	John V. Tunney	S. I. Hayakawa
Indiana	Vance Hartke	Richard Lugar
Maryland	J. Glenn Beall Jr.	Paul Sarbanes
New Mexico	Joseph Montoya	Harrison Schmitt
New York	James L. Buckley	Daniel Patrick Moynihan
Ohio	Robert Taft Jr.	Howard Metzenbaum
Tennessee	Bill Brock	Jim Sasser
Utah	Frank Moss	Orrin Hatch
Wyoming	Gale W. McGee	Malcolm Wallop

=== Post-election changes ===
Five Democrats either resigned or died between at the end of 93rd Congress and during the 94th Congress. All were initially replaced by Democratic appointees.

State	Senator	Replaced by
Alabama (Class 3)	James Allen	Maryon Pittman Allen
Arkansas (Class 2)	John L. McClellan	Kaneaster Hodges Jr.
Minnesota (Class 1)	Hubert Humphrey	Muriel Humphrey
Minnesota (Class 2)	Walter Mondale	Wendell R. Anderson
Montana (Class 2)	Lee Metcalf	Paul G. Hatfield

== Change in composition ==
=== Before the elections ===
D_{1}	D_{2}	D_{3}	D_{4}	D_{5}	D_{6}	D_{7}	D_{8}	D_{9}	D_{10}
D_{20}	D_{19}	D_{18}	D_{17}	D_{16}	D_{15}	D_{14}	D_{13}	D_{12}	D_{11}
D_{21}	D_{22}	D_{23}	D_{24}	D_{25}	D_{26}	D_{27}	D_{28}	D_{29}	D_{30}
D_{40}	D_{39}	D_{38}	D_{37}	D_{36}	D_{35}	D_{34}	D_{33}	D_{32}	D_{31}
D_{41} Ca. Ran	D_{42} Fla. Ran	D_{43} Ind. Ran	D_{44} Maine; Ran	D_{45} Mass. Ran	D_{46} Mich. Retired	D_{47} Minn. Ran	D_{48} Miss. Ran	D_{49} Mo. Retired	D_{50} Mont. Retired
Majority →									D_{51} Nev. Ran
D_{60} Wis. Ran	D_{59} W.Va. Ran	D_{58} Wa. Ran	D_{57} Utah; Ran	D_{56} Texas; Ran	D_{55} R.I. Retired	D_{54} N.D. Ran	D_{53} N.M. Ran	D_{52} N.J. Ran	D_{51} Nev. Ran
D_{61} Wy. Ran	I_{1} Va. Ran	C_{1} N.Y. Ran	R_{37} Vt. Ran	R_{36} Tenn. Ran	R_{35} Pa. Retired	R_{34} Ohio; Ran	R_{33} Neb. Retired	R_{32} Md. Ran	R_{31} Hawaii; Retired
R_{21}	R_{22}	R_{23}	R_{24}	R_{25}	R_{26}	R_{27}	R_{28} Ariz. Retired	R_{29} Conn. Ran	R_{30} Del. Ran
R_{20}	R_{19}	R_{18}	R_{17}	R_{16}	R_{15}	R_{14}	R_{13}	R_{12}	R_{11}
R_{1}	R_{2}	R_{3}	R_{4}	R_{5}	R_{6}	R_{7}	R_{8}	R_{9}	R_{10}

=== Elections results ===
D_{1}	D_{2}	D_{3}	D_{4}	D_{5}	D_{6}	D_{7}	D_{8}	D_{9}	D_{10}
D_{20}	D_{19}	D_{18}	D_{17}	D_{16}	D_{15}	D_{14}	D_{13}	D_{12}	D_{11}
D_{21}	D_{22}	D_{23}	D_{24}	D_{25}	D_{26}	D_{27}	D_{28}	D_{29}	D_{30}
D_{40}	D_{39}	D_{38}	D_{37}	D_{36}	D_{35}	D_{34}	D_{33}	D_{32}	D_{31}
D_{41} Fla. Re-elected	D_{42} Maine; Re-elected	D_{43} Mass. Re-elected	D_{44} Mich. Hold	D_{45} Minn. Re-elected	D_{46} Miss. Re-elected	D_{47} Mont. Hold	D_{48} Nev. Re-elected	D_{49} N.J. Re-elected	D_{50} N.D. Re-elected
Majority →									D_{51} Texas; Re-elected
D_{60} Ohio; Gain	D_{59} N.Y. Gain	D_{58} Neb. Gain	D_{57} Md. Gain	D_{56} Hawaii; Gain	D_{55} Ariz. Gain	D_{54} Wis. Re-elected	D_{53} W.Va. Re-elected	D_{52} Wa. Re-elected	D_{51} Texas; Re-elected
D_{61} Tenn. Gain	I_{1} Va. Re-elected	R_{38} Wy. Gain	R_{37} Utah; Gain	R_{36} R.I. Gain	R_{35} N.M. Gain	R_{34} Mo. Gain	R_{33} Ind. Gain	R_{32} Ca. Gain	R_{31} Vt. Re-elected
R_{21}	R_{22}	R_{23}	R_{24}	R_{25}	R_{26}	R_{27}	R_{28} Conn. Re-elected	R_{29} Del. Re-elected	R_{30} Pa. Hold
R_{20}	R_{19}	R_{18}	R_{17}	R_{16}	R_{15}	R_{14}	R_{13}	R_{12}	R_{11}
R_{1}	R_{2}	R_{3}	R_{4}	R_{5}	R_{6}	R_{7}	R_{8}	R_{9}	R_{10}

Key

C_{#}	Conservative
D_{#}	Democratic
R_{#}	Republican
I_{#}	Independent

== Race summaries ==
=== Elections leading to the next Congress ===
In these general elections, the winners were elected for the term beginning January 3, 1977; ordered by state.

All of the elections involved the Class 1 seats.

State	Incumbent			Result	Candidates
State	Senator	Party	Electoral history	Result	Candidates
Arizona	Paul Fannin	Republican	1964; 1970	Incumbent retired. Democratic gain.	▌ ✓ Dennis DeConcini (Democratic) 54.0%; ▌Sam Steiger (Republican) 43.3%; Others: ▌Bob Field (Independent) 1.5%; ▌Allan Norwitz (Libertarian) 1.0%; ▌William Mathews Feighan (Independent) 0.2%
California	John V. Tunney	Democratic	1970; 1971 (appointed)	Incumbent lost re-election. Republican gain. Incumbent resigned January 1, 1977 to give successor preferential seniority. Winner appointed January 2, 1977.	▌ ✓ S. I. Hayakawa (Republican) 50.2%; ▌John V. Tunney (Democratic) 46.9%; Others: ▌David Wald (Peace and Freedom) 1.4%; ▌Jack McCoy (American Independent) 1.1%; ▌Omari Musa (Independent) 0.4%
Connecticut	Lowell Weicker	Republican	1970	Incumbent re-elected.	▌ ✓ Lowell Weicker (Republican) 57.7%; ▌Gloria Schaffer (Democratic) 41.2%; ▌Robert Barnabei (Wallace) 1.1%
Delaware	William Roth	Republican	1970; 1971 (appointed)	Incumbent re-elected.	▌ ✓ William Roth (Republican) 55.8%; ▌Thomas C. Maloney (Democratic) 43.6%; Others: ▌Donald G. Gies (American) 0.3%; ▌Joseph F. McInerney (Independent) 0.2%; ▌John A. Massimilla (Prohibition) 0.0%
Florida	Lawton Chiles	Democratic	1970	Incumbent re-elected.	▌ ✓ Lawton Chiles (Democratic) 63.0%; ▌John Grady (Republican) 37.0%
Hawaii	Hiram Fong	Republican	1959 (new state); 1964; 1970	Incumbent retired. Democratic gain.	▌ ✓ Spark Matsunaga (Democratic) 53.7%; ▌William F. Quinn (Republican) 40.6%; ▌Anthony Hodges (People's) 4.7%; Others: ▌James Kimmel (Independent) 0.5%; ▌Rockne Hart Johnson (Libertarian) 0.5%
Indiana	Vance Hartke	Democratic	1958; 1964; 1970	Incumbent lost re-election. Republican gain.	▌ ✓ Richard Lugar (Republican) 58.8%; ▌Vance Hartke (Democratic) 40.5%; Others: ▌Don L. Lee (Independent) 0.7%; ▌David Lee Hoagland (US Labor) 0.1%
Maine	Edmund Muskie	Democratic	1958; 1964; 1970	Incumbent re-elected.	▌ ✓ Edmund Muskie (Democratic) 60.2%; ▌Robert A. G. Monks (Republican) 39.8%
Maryland	J. Glenn Beall Jr.	Republican	1970	Incumbent lost re-election. Democratic gain.	▌ ✓ Paul Sarbanes (Democratic) 56.5%; ▌J. Glenn Beall Jr. (Republican) 38.8%; ▌Bruce Bradley (Independent) 4.6%
Massachusetts	Ted Kennedy	Democratic	1962 (special); 1964; 1970	Incumbent re-elected.	▌ ✓ Ted Kennedy (Democratic) 69.3%; ▌Michael S. Robertson (Republican) 29.0%; Others: ▌Carol Henderson Evans (Socialist Workers) 1.1%; ▌H. Graham Lowry (US Labor) 0.6%
Michigan	Philip Hart	Democratic	1958; 1964; 1970	Incumbent retired. Democratic hold. Incumbent died December 26, 1976. Winner appointed December 30, 1976.	▌ ✓ Donald Riegle (Democratic) 52.5%; ▌Marvin L. Esch (Republican) 46.8%; Others: ▌Bette Jane Erwin (Libertarian) 0.3%; ▌Theodore G. Albert (Human Rights) 0.2%; ▌Paula L. Reimers (Socialist Workers) 0.1%; ▌Frank Girard (Socialist Labor) 0.1%; ▌Peter A. Signorelli (U.S. Labor) 0.1%
Minnesota	Hubert Humphrey	DFL	1948; 1954; 1960; 1964 (resigned); 1970	Incumbent re-elected.	▌ ✓ Hubert Humphrey (DFL) 67.5%; ▌Gerald Brekke (Ind.-Republican) 25.0%; ▌Paul Helm (American) 6.6%; Others: ▌Bill Peterson (Socialist Workers) 0.5%; ▌Robin E. Miller (Libertarian) 0.3%; ▌Matt Savola (Communist) 0.1%
Mississippi	John C. Stennis	Democratic	1947 (special); 1952; 1958; 1964; 1970	Incumbent re-elected.	▌ ✓ John C. Stennis (Democratic); Unopposed
Missouri	Stuart Symington	Democratic	1952; 1958; 1964; 1970	Incumbent retired. Republican gain. Incumbent resigned December 27, 1976 to give successor preferential seniority. Winner appointed the same day.	▌ ✓ John Danforth (Republican) 56.9%; ▌Warren E. Hearnes (Democratic) 42.5%; ▌Lawrence Petty (Independent) 0.6%
Montana	Mike Mansfield	Democratic	1952; 1958; 1964; 1970	Incumbent retired. Democratic hold.	▌ ✓ John Melcher (Democratic) 64.2%; ▌Stanley C. Burger (Republican) 35.8%
Nebraska	Roman Hruska	Republican	1954 (special); 1958; 1964; 1970	Incumbent retired. Democratic gain. Incumbent resigned December 27, 1976 to give successor preferential seniority. Winner appointed December 28, 1976 to finish the term.	▌ ✓ Edward Zorinsky (Democratic) 52.4%; ▌John Y. McCollister (Republican) 47.5%
Nevada	Howard Cannon	Democratic	1958; 1964; 1970	Incumbent re-elected.	▌ ✓ Howard Cannon (Democratic) 63.0%; ▌David Towell (Republican) 31.4%; Others: ▌Byron D. Young (Independent American) 1.8%; ▌Dan Becan (Libertarian) 1.1%; None of These Candidates 2.6%
New Jersey	Harrison A. Williams	Democratic	1958; 1964; 1970	Incumbent re-elected.	▌ ✓ Harrison A. Williams (Democratic) 60.7%; ▌David A. Norcross (Republican) 38.0%; Others: ▌Hannibal Cundari (Libertarian) 0.7%; ▌Bernardo S. Doganiero (Socialist Labor) 0.3%; ▌Leif Johnson (Labor) 0.2%
New Mexico	Joseph Montoya	Democratic	1964 (special); 1964; 1970	Incumbent lost re-election. Republican gain.	▌ ✓ Harrison Schmitt (Republican) 56.8%; ▌Joseph Montoya (Democratic) 42.7%; Others: ▌Ernesto B. Borunda (Raza Unida) 0.3%; ▌Matt Dillion (American Independent) 0.2%
New York	James L. Buckley	Conservative	1970	Incumbent ran as a Republican and lost re-election. Democratic gain.	▌ ✓ Daniel Patrick Moynihan (Democratic) 54.2%; ▌James L. Buckley (Republican) 44.9%; Others: ▌Herbert Aptheker (Communist) 0.4%; ▌Marcia Gallo (Socialist Workers) 0.3%; ▌Martin E. Nixon (Libertarian) 0.2%; ▌Elijah C. Boyd (U.S. Labor) 0.1%
North Dakota	Quentin Burdick	Democratic-NPL	1960 (special); 1964; 1970	Incumbent re-elected.	▌ ✓ Quentin Burdick (Democratic-NPL) 62.1%; ▌Robert Stroup (Republican) 36.6%; ▌Clarence Haggard (Independent) 0.4%
Ohio	Robert Taft Jr.	Republican	1970	Incumbent lost re-election. Democratic gain. Incumbent resigned December 28, 1976 to give successor preferential seniority. Winner appointed December 29, 1976.	▌ ✓ Howard Metzenbaum (Democratic) 49.5%; ▌Robert Taft Jr. (Republican) 46.5%; Others: ▌John O'Neill (Independent) 1.4%; ▌Donald E. Babcock (American Independent) 0.9%; ▌Emma Lila Fundaburk (Independent) 0.9%; ▌Melissa Singler (Socialist Workers) 0.8%
Pennsylvania	Hugh Scott	Republican	1958; 1964; 1970	Incumbent retired. Republican hold.	▌ ✓ John Heinz (Republican) 52.4%; ▌William J. Green III (Democratic) 46.8%; Others: ▌Andrew J. Watson (Constitution) 0.6%; ▌Frederick W. Stanton (Socialist Workers) 0.1%; ▌Bernard Salera (Labor) 0.1%; ▌Frank Kinces (Communist) 0.1%
Rhode Island	John Pastore	Democratic	1950 (special); 1952; 1958; 1964; 1970	Incumbent retired. Republican gain Incumbent resigned December 28, 1976 to give successor preferential seniority. Winner appointed December 29, 1976.	▌ ✓ John Chafee (Republican) 57.7%; ▌Richard P. Lorber (Democratic) 42.0%; ▌Margaret Cann (Communist) 0.2%
Tennessee	Bill Brock	Republican	1970	Incumbent lost re-election. Democratic gain.	▌ ✓ Jim Sasser (Democratic) 52.5%; ▌Bill Brock (Republican) 47.0%; Others: ▌Mark Clark Bates (Independent) 0.4%; ▌Willie C. Jacox (Independent) 0.1%; ▌Arnold Joseph Zandie (Independent) 0.1%
Texas	Lloyd Bentsen	Democratic	1970	Incumbent re-elected.	▌ ✓ Lloyd Bentsen (Democratic) 56.8%; ▌Alan Steelman (Republican) 42.2%; Others: ▌Pedro Vasquez (Socialist Workers) 0.5%; ▌Marjorie P. Gallion (American Independent) 0.5%
Utah	Frank Moss	Democratic	1958; 1964; 1970	Incumbent lost re-election. Republican gain.	▌ ✓ Orrin Hatch (Republican) 53.7%; ▌Frank Moss (Democratic) 44.8%; Others: ▌George M. Batchelor (Independent American) 0.9%; ▌Steve Trotter (Libertarian) 0.6%
Vermont	Robert Stafford	Republican	1971 (appointed); 1972 (special)	Incumbent re-elected.	▌ ✓ Robert Stafford (Republican) 50.0%; ▌Thomas P. Salmon (Democratic) 45.3%; ▌Nancy Kaufman (Liberty Union) 4.7%
Virginia	Harry F. Byrd Jr.	Independent	1965 (appointed) (Note: Byrd was appointed to the US Senate in 1965 and elected to finish his father's term in 1966 as a Democrat; he was re-elected in 1970 as an independent.); 1966 (special); 1970	Incumbent re-elected.	▌ ✓ Harry F. Byrd Jr. (Independent) 57.2%; ▌Elmo Zumwalt (Democratic) 38.3%; ▌Martin H. Perper (Independent) 4.5%
Washington	Henry M. Jackson	Democratic	1952; 1958; 1964; 1970	Incumbent re-elected.	▌ ✓ Henry M. Jackson (Democratic) 71.8%; ▌George M. Brown (Republican) 24.2%; Others: ▌Dave Smith (American Independent) 1.9%; ▌Richard K. Kenney (Libertarian) 1.3%; ▌Karl Bermann (Socialist Workers) 0.5%; ▌William F. Wertz Jr. (U.S. Labor) 0.2%
West Virginia	Robert Byrd	Democratic	1958; 1964; 1970	Incumbent re-elected.	▌ ✓ Robert Byrd (Democratic) 99.9%; Unopposed
Wisconsin	William Proxmire	Democratic	1957 (special); 1958; 1964; 1970	Incumbent re-elected.	▌ ✓ William Proxmire (Democratic) 72.2%; ▌Stanley York (Republican) 27.0%; Others: ▌William Osborne Hart (Independent) 0.4%; ▌Robert Schwartz (Socialist Workers) 0.3%; ▌Robert E. Nordlander (Socialist Labor) 0.1%
Wyoming	Gale W. McGee	Democratic	1958; 1964; 1970	Incumbent lost re-election. Republican gain.	▌ ✓ Malcolm Wallop (Republican) 54.7%; ▌Gale W. McGee (Democratic) 45.4%

== Closest races ==
Nine races had a margin of victory under 10%:

State	Party of winner	Margin
Ohio	Democratic (flip)	2.99%
California	Republican (flip)	3.2%
Vermont	Republican	4.6%
Tennessee	Democratic (flip)	5.45%
Michigan	Democratic	5.6%
Pennsylvania	Republican	5.6%
Nebraska	Democratic (flip)	5.82%
Utah	Republican (flip)	8.9%
New York	Democratic (flip)	9.2%

Nevada was the tipping point state, with a margin of 31.6%.

== Arizona ==
Arizona election
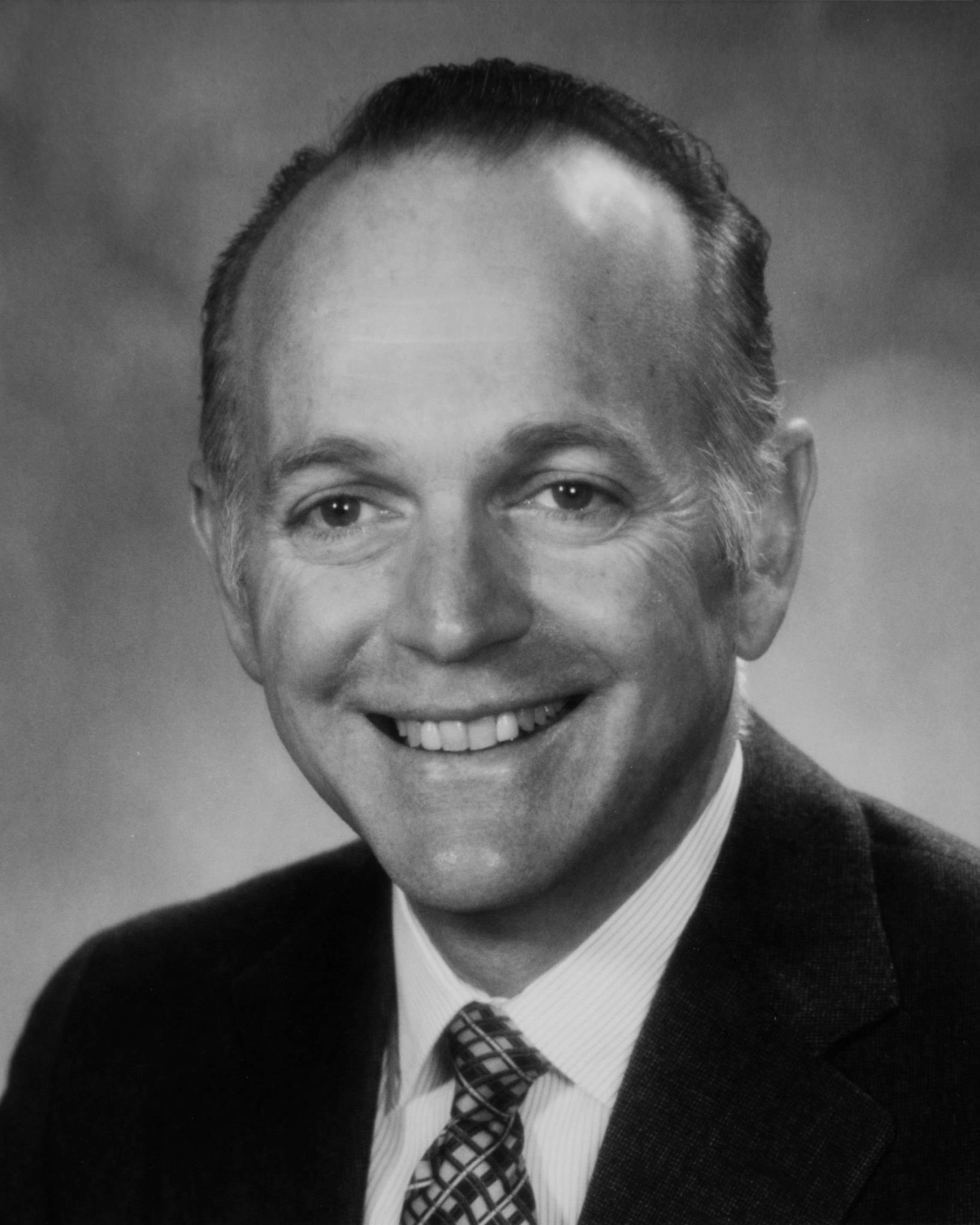

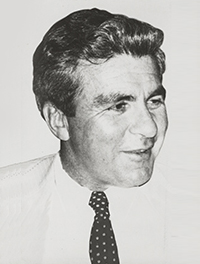
Nominee	Dennis DeConcini	Sam Steiger
Party	Democratic	Republican
Popular vote	400,334	321,236
Percentage	54.0%	43.3%
- County results DeConcini: 40–50% 50–60% 60–70% 70–80% Steiger: 50–60%
U.S. senator before election
Paul Fannin
Republican
Elected U.S. senator
Dennis DeConcini
Democratic

Incumbent Republican Paul Fannin retired instead of seeking a third term. Democratic attorney and businessman Dennis DeConcini won the open seat over Sam Steiger, U.S. congressman of Arizona's 3rd congressional district.

General election results
Party	Candidate	Votes	%
Democratic	Dennis DeConcini	400,334	54.01
Republican	Sam Steiger	321,236	43.34
Independent	Bob Field	10,765	1.45
Libertarian	Allan Norwitz	7,310	0.99
Independent	Wm. Mathews Feighan	1,565	0.21
Majority		79,098	8.68
Turnout		741,210	
Democratic gain from Republican			

== California ==
California election
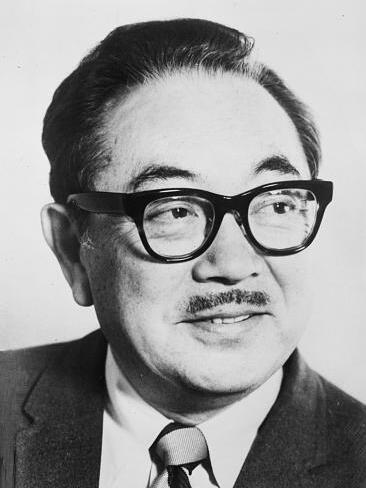

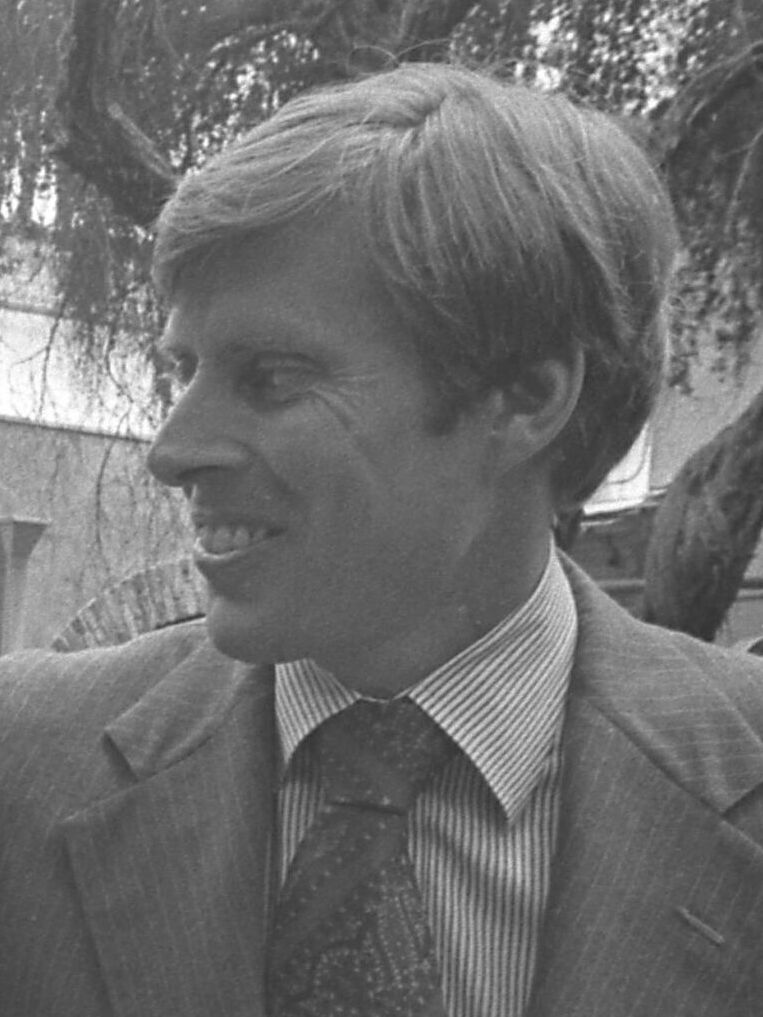
Nominee	S. I. Hayakawa	John V. Tunney
Party	Republican	Democratic
Popular vote	3,748,973	3,502,862
Percentage	50.2%	46.9%
- County results Hayakawa: 40–50% 50–60% 60–70% Tunney: 40–50% 50–60%
U.S. senator before election
John V. Tunney
Democratic
Elected U.S. senator
S. I. Hayakawa
Republican

Incumbent Democrat John Tunney ran for re-election to a second term, but was defeated by Republican Sam Hayakawa, president emeritus of San Francisco State University.

General election results
Party	Candidate	Votes	%
Republican	S. I. Hayakawa	3,748,973	50.18
Democratic	John V. Tunney (incumbent)	3,502,862	46.89
Peace and Freedom	David Wald	104,383	1.40
American Independent	Jack McCoy	82,739	1.11
Independent	Omari Musa	31,629	0.42
Majority		246,111	3.23
Turnout		7,470,586	
Republican gain from Democratic			

== Connecticut ==
Connecticut election
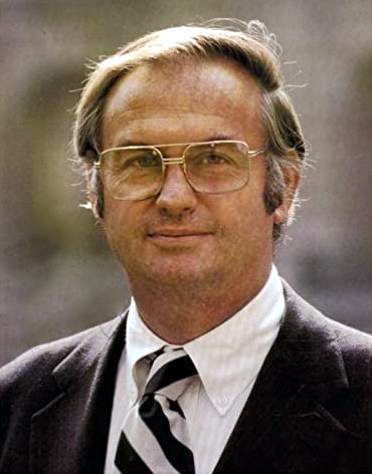

Nominee	Lowell Weicker	Gloria Schaffer
Party	Republican	Democratic
Popular vote	785,683	561,018
Percentage	57.7%	41.2%
- Weicker: 40–50% 50–60% 60–70% 70–80% Schaffer: 40–50% 50–60% 60–70%
U.S. senator before election
Lowell Weicker
Republican
Elected U.S. senator
Lowell Weicker
Republican

Incumbent Republican Lowell Weicker won re-election to a second term over Gloria Schaffer, Connecticut secretary of state.

General election results
Party	Candidate	Votes	%
Republican	Lowell Weicker (incumbent)	785,683	57.70
Democratic	Gloria Schaffer	561,018	41.20
George Wallace	Robert Barnabei	14,407	1.06
	Others	558	0.04
Majority		224,665	16.50
Turnout		1,361,666	
Republican hold			

== Delaware ==
Delaware election
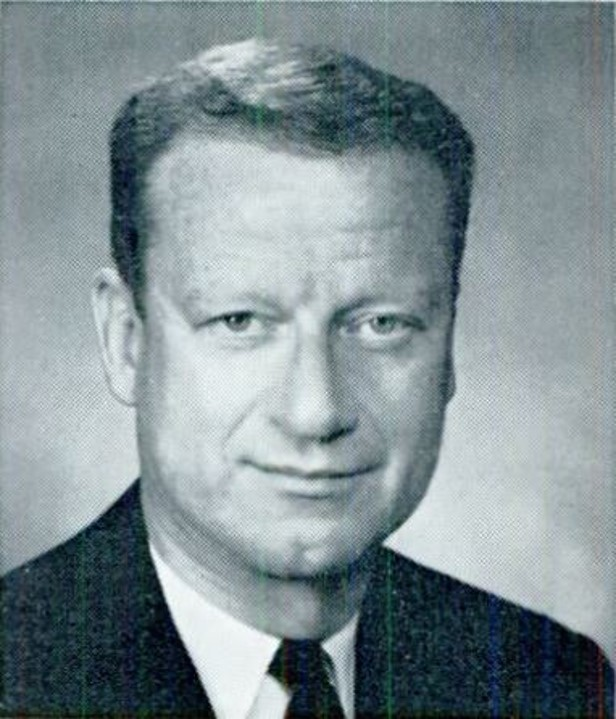

Nominee	William Roth	Thomas Maloney
Party	Republican	Democratic
Popular vote	125,454	98,042
Percentage	55.8%	43.6%
- County results Roth: 50–60% 60–70% 70–80% Maloney: 50–60% 60–70%
U.S. senator before election
William Roth
Republican
Elected U.S. senator
William Roth
Republican

Incumbent Republican William Roth won reelection to a second term over Thomas Maloney, mayor of Wilmington.

General election results
Party	Candidate	Votes	%
Republican	William Roth (incumbent)	125,454	55.81
Democratic	Thomas Maloney	98,042	43.61
American	Donald G. Gies	646	0.29
Non-Partisan	Joseph F. McInerney	437	0.19
Prohibition	John A. Massimilla	216	0.1
Majority		27,412	12.20
Turnout		224,795	
Republican hold			

== Florida ==
Florida election
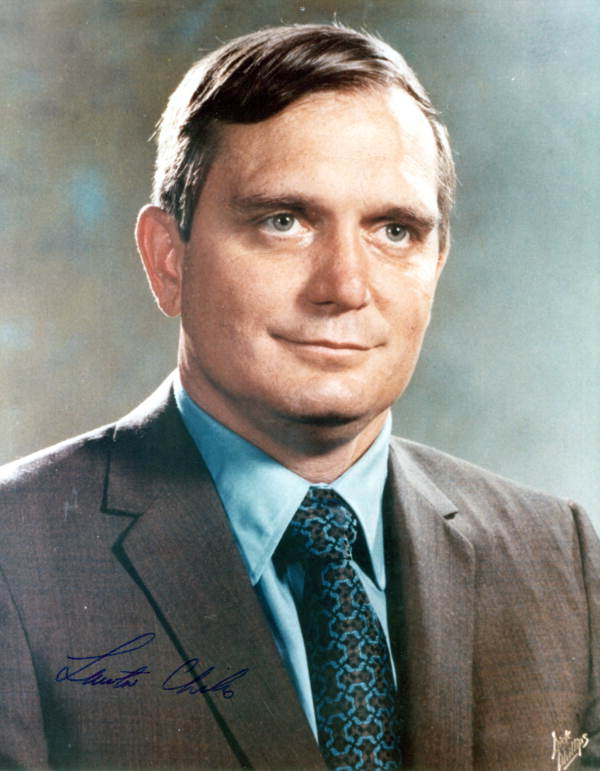

Nominee	Lawton Chiles	John Grady
Party	Democratic	Republican
Popular vote	1,799,518	1,057,886
Percentage	63.0%	37.0%
- County results Chiles: 50–60% 60–70% 70–80% 80–90% Grady: 50–60%
U.S. senator before election
Lawton Chiles
Democratic
Elected U.S. senator
Lawton Chiles
Democratic

Incumbent Democrat Lawton Chiles won re-election to a second term over John Grady, mayor of Belle Glade.

General election results
Party	Candidate	Votes	%
Democratic	Lawton Chiles (incumbent)	1,799,518	63.0
Republican	John Grady	1,057,886	37.0
Write-in	Ed Ice	123	0.0
Write-in	Tim Adams	7	0.0
Majority		741,632	26.0
Turnout		2,857,534	
Democratic hold			

== Hawaii ==
Hawaii election
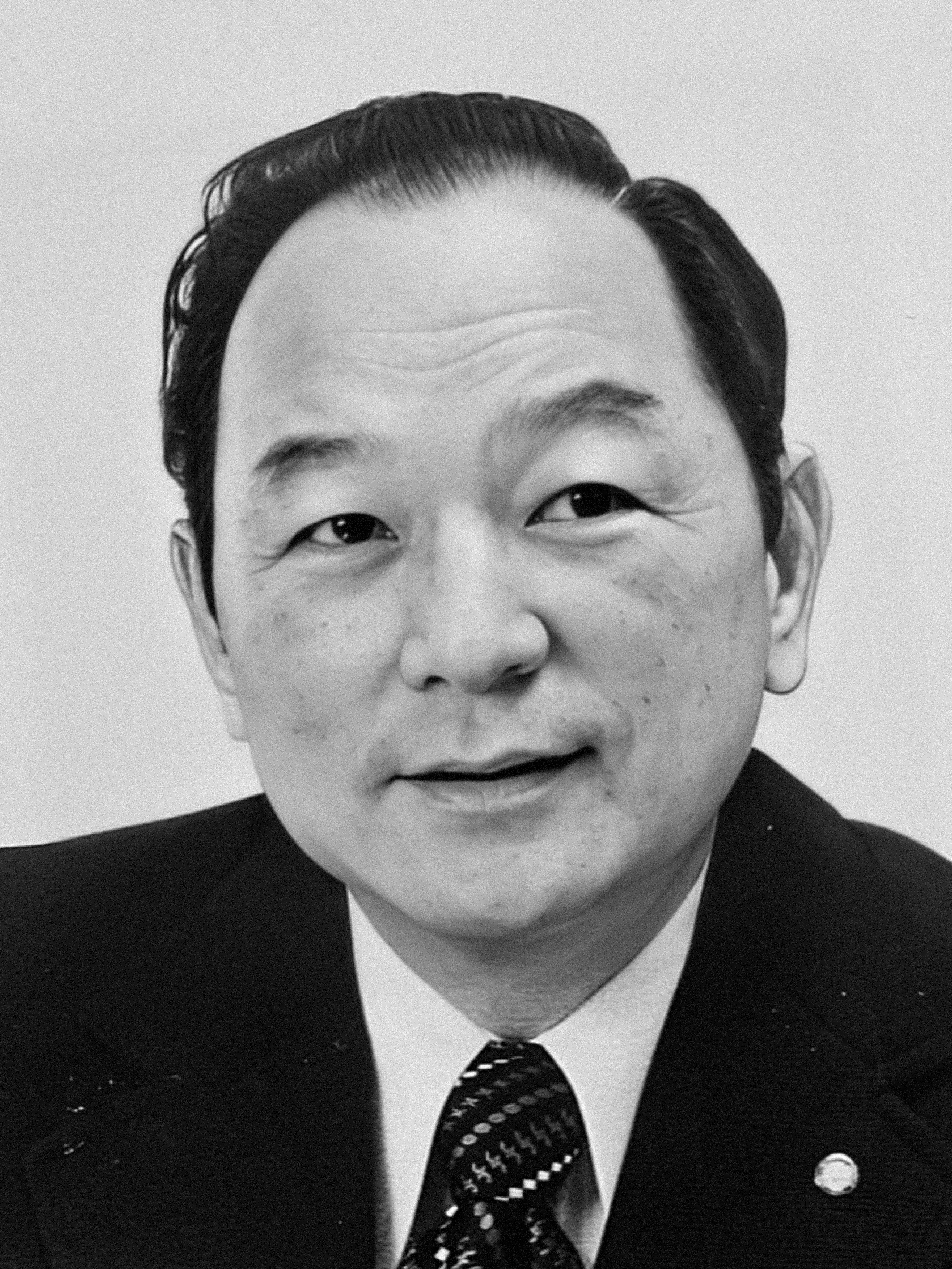

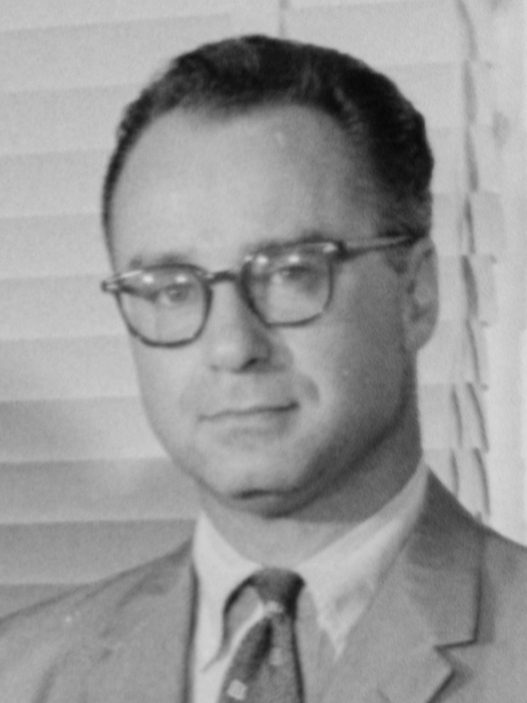
Nominee	Spark Matsunaga	William Quinn
Party	Democratic	Republican
Popular vote	162,305	122,724
Percentage	53.7%	40.6%
- County results Matsunaga: 50–60% 60–70%
U.S. senator before election
Hiram Fong
Republican
Elected U.S. senator
Spark Matsunaga
Democratic

Incumbent Republican Hiram Fong retired instead of seeking re-election to a fourth term. Democrat Spark Matsunaga won the open seat over Republican William Quinn, former governor of Hawaii.

General election results
Party	Candidate	Votes	%
Democratic	Spark Matsunaga	162,305	53.7
Republican	William Quinn	122,724	40.6
People's	Anthony Hodges	14,226	4.7
Nonpartisan	James Kimmel	1,433	0.5
Libertarian	Rockne Hart Johnson	1,404	0.5
Majority		39,581	13.1
Turnout		302,092	
Democratic gain from Republican			

== Indiana ==
Indiana election
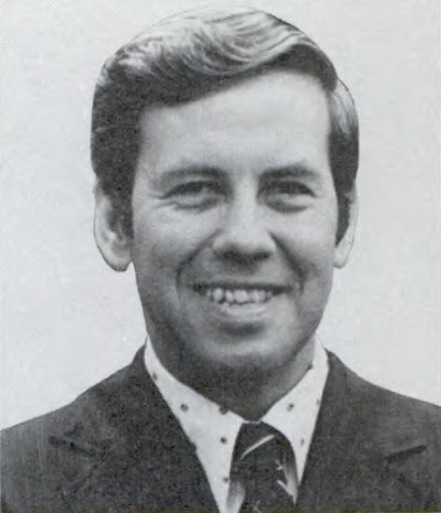

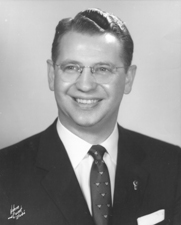
Nominee	Richard Lugar	Vance Hartke
Party	Republican	Democratic
Popular vote	1,275,833	878,522
Percentage	58.8%	40.5%
- County results Lugar: 50–60% 60–70% 70–80% Hartke: 50–60% 60–70%
U.S. senator before election
Vance Hartke
Democratic
Elected U.S. senator
Richard Lugar
Republican

Incumbent Democrat Vance Hartke ran for re-election to a fourth term, but was defeated by Republican challenger Richard Lugar, mayor of Indianapolis.

General election results
Party	Candidate	Votes	%
Republican	Richard Lugar	1,275,833	58.76
Democratic	Vance Hartke (incumbent)	878,522	40.46
	Don L. Lee	14,321	0.66
U.S. Labor	David Lee Hoagland	2,511	0.12
Majority		397,311	18.30
Turnout		2,171,187	
Republican gain from Democratic			

== Maine ==
Maine election
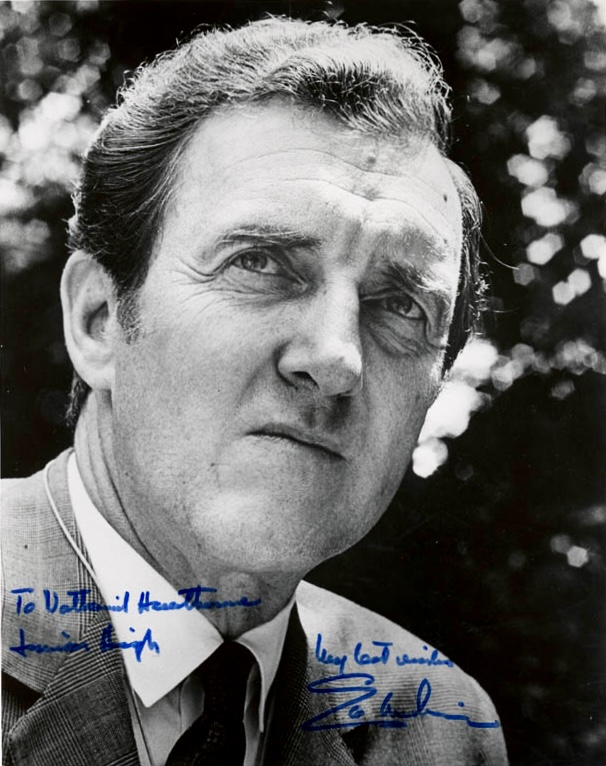

Nominee	Edmund Muskie	Robert A. G. Monks
Party	Democratic	Republican
Popular vote	292,704	193,489
Percentage	60.2%	39.8%
- County results Muskie: 50–60% 60–70% Monks: 50–60%
U.S. senator before election
Edmund Muskie
Democratic
Elected U.S. senator
Edmund Muskie
Democratic

Incumbent Democrat Edmund Muskie won re-election to a fourth term over Republican Robert A. G. Monks, shareholder activist.

General election results
Party	Candidate	Votes	%
Democratic	Edmund Muskie (incumbent)	292,704	60.20
Republican	Robert A. G. Monks	193,489	39.80
Majority		99,215	20.41
Turnout		486,193	
Democratic hold			

== Maryland ==
Maryland election
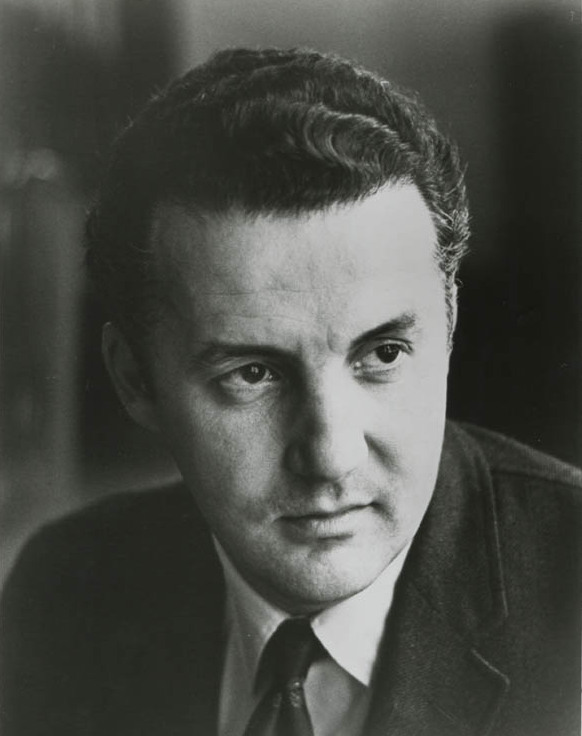

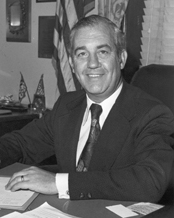
Nominee	Paul Sarbanes	J. Glenn Beall Jr.
Party	Democratic	Republican
Popular vote	772,101	530,439
Percentage	56.6%	38.9%
- County results Sarbanes: 40–50% 50–60% 70–80% Beall: 40–50% 50–60% 60–70%
U.S. senator before election
J. Glenn Beall Jr.
Republican
Elected U.S. senator
Paul Sarbanes
Democratic

Incumbent Republican J. Glenn Beall Jr. ran for re-election to a second term, but was defeated by Democratic challenger Paul Sarbanes, member of the U.S. House of Representatives.

General election results
Party	Candidate	Votes	%
Democratic	Paul Sarbanes	772,101	56.55
Republican	J. Glenn Beall Jr. (incumbent)	530,439	38.85
Independent	Bruce Bradley	62,750	4.60
Majority		241,662	17.70
Turnout		1,365,290	
Democratic gain from Republican			

== Massachusetts ==
Massachusetts election
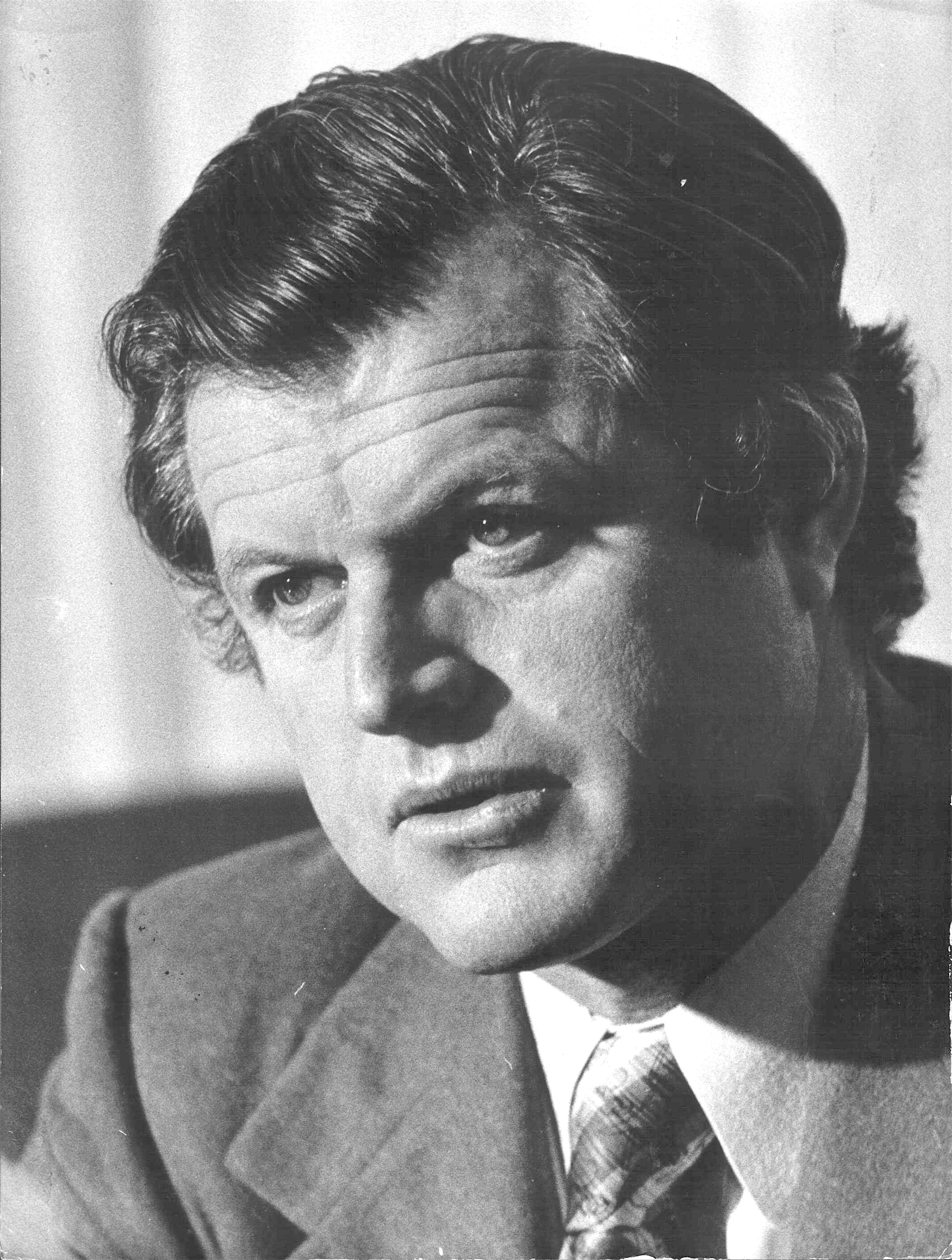

Nominee	Ted Kennedy	Michael Robertson
Party	Democratic	Republican
Popular vote	1,726,657	722,641
Percentage	69.3%	29.0%

Kennedy
40–50%
50–60%
60–70%
70–80%
80–90%
Robertson
40–50%
50–60%
U.S. senator before election
Ted Kennedy
Democratic
Elected U.S. senator
Ted Kennedy
Democratic

Incumbent Democrat Ted Kennedy won re-election to his fourth (his third full) term over Republican businessman, Michael Robertson.

General election
Party	Candidate	Votes	%	±%
Democratic	Edward M. Kennedy (incumbent)	1,726,657	69.31	+7.15%
Republican	Michael S. Robertson	722,641	29.01	−7.99%
Socialist Workers	Carol Henderson Evans	26,283	1.06	+0.52%
U.S. Labor	H. Graham Lowry	15,517	0.62	
	All others	157	0.01	
Total votes		2,491,255	85.55	
Majority		1,004,016	40.30	15.14%
Democratic hold		Swing		

== Michigan ==
Michigan election
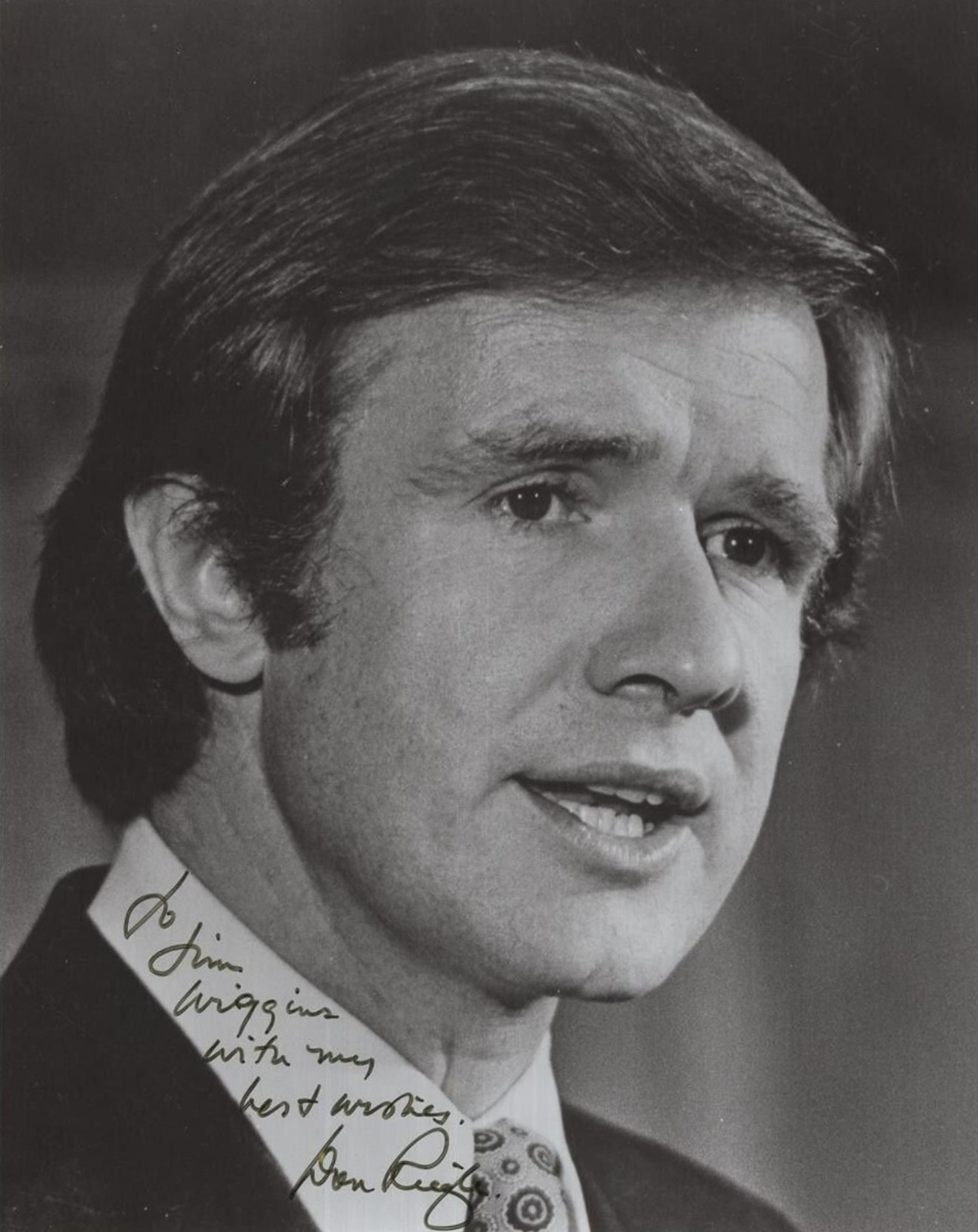

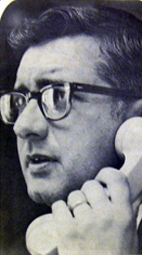
Nominee	Donald Riegle	Marvin Esch
Party	Democratic	Republican
Popular vote	1,831,031	1,635,087
Percentage	52.5%	46.9%
- County results Riegle: 40–50% 50–60% 60–70% Esch: 40-50% 50-60% 60-70% 70-80%
U.S. senator before election
Philip Hart
Democratic
Elected U.S. senator
Donald Riegle
Democratic

Incumbent Democrat Philip Hart retired instead of seeking a fourth term. Democrat Donald Riegle, member of the U.S. House of Representatives, won the open seat over fellow congressman Republican Marvin Esch.

General election results
Party	Candidate	Votes	%
Democratic	Donald Riegle	1,831,031	52.46
Republican	Marvin L. Esch	1,635,087	46.85
Libertarian	Bette Jane Erwin	8,842	<1
Human Rights	Theodore G. Albert	7,281	<1
Socialist Workers	Paula L. Reimers	3,399	<1
Socialist Labor	Frank Girard	2,554	<1
U.S. Labor	Peter A. Signorelli	2,218	<1
Majority		195,944	5.61
Turnout		3,490,412	
Democratic hold			

== Minnesota ==
Minnesota election
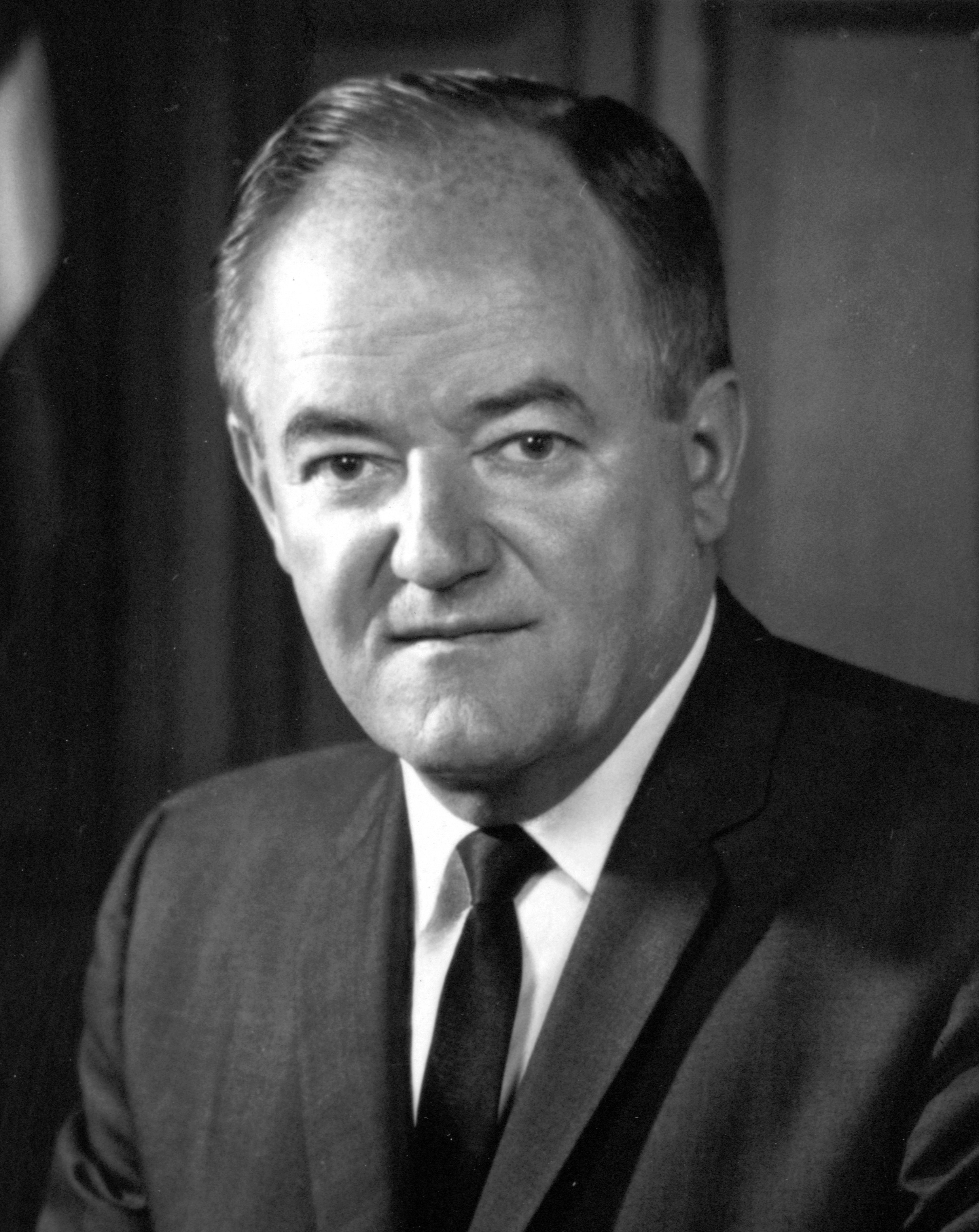

Nominee	Hubert Humphrey	Gerald Brekke
Party	Democratic (DFL)	Ind.-Republican
Popular vote	1,290,736	478,602
Percentage	67.5%	25.0%
Nominee	Paul Helm
Party	American
Popular vote	125,612
Percentage	6.6%
- County results Humphrey: 50–60% 60–70% 70–80% 80–90%
U.S. senator before election
Hubert Humphrey
Democratic (DFL)
Elected U.S. senator
Hubert Humphrey
Democratic (DFL)

Incumbent Democrat Hubert Humphrey won re-election to a fifth term over Republican Gerald Brekke, college professor.

Democratic primary election
Party	Candidate	Votes	%
Democratic (DFL)	Hubert H. Humphrey (incumbent)	317,632	91.3
Democratic (DFL)	Dick Bullock	30,262	8.7

Republican primary election
Party	Candidate	Votes	%
Ind.-Republican	Gerald W. Brekke	76,183	54.5
Ind.-Republican	Richard "Dick" Franson	32,115	23.0
Ind.-Republican	John H. Glover	13,014	9.3
Ind.-Republican	Roland "Butch" Riemers	9,307	6.7
Ind.-Republican	Bea Mooney	9,150	6.5

General election
Party	Candidate	Votes	%
Democratic (DFL)	Hubert H. Humphrey (incumbent)	1,290,736	67.51
Ind.-Republican	Gerald W. Brekke	478,602	25.03
American	Paul Helm	125,612	6.57
Socialist Workers	Bill Peterson	9,380	0.49
Libertarian	Robin E. Miller	5,476	0.29
Communist	Matt Savola	2,214	0.12
Majority		812,134	42.48
Turnout		1,912,020	
Democratic (DFL) hold			

== Mississippi ==
Mississippi election
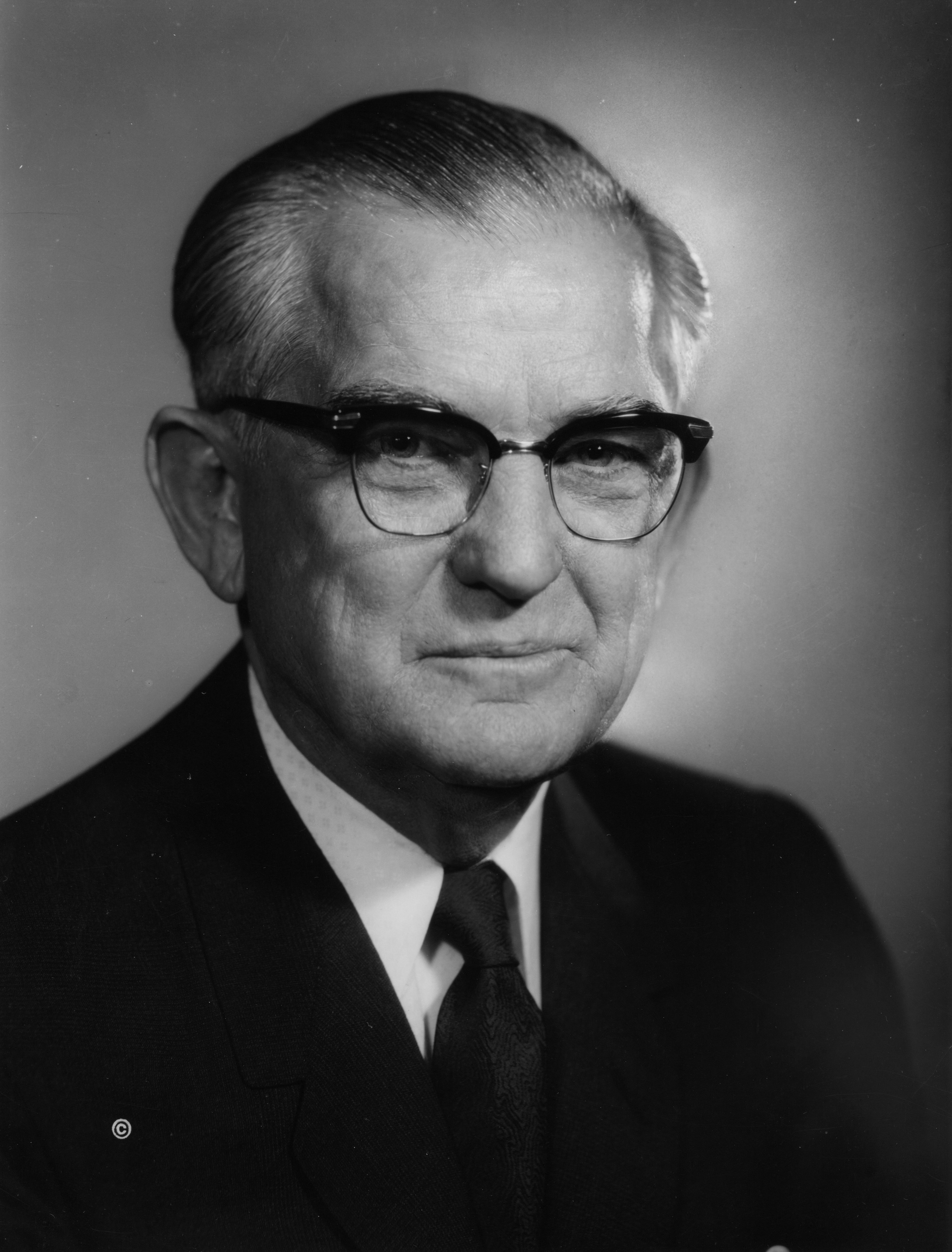
Nominee	John C. Stennis
Party	Democratic
Popular vote	554,433
Percentage	100.0%
U.S. senator before election
John C. Stennis
Democratic
Elected U.S. senator
John C. Stennis
Democratic

Incumbent Democrat John C. Stennis won re-election to his sixth term.

General election results
Party	Candidate	Votes	%
Democratic	John Stennis (incumbent)	554,433	100.0

== Missouri ==
Missouri election
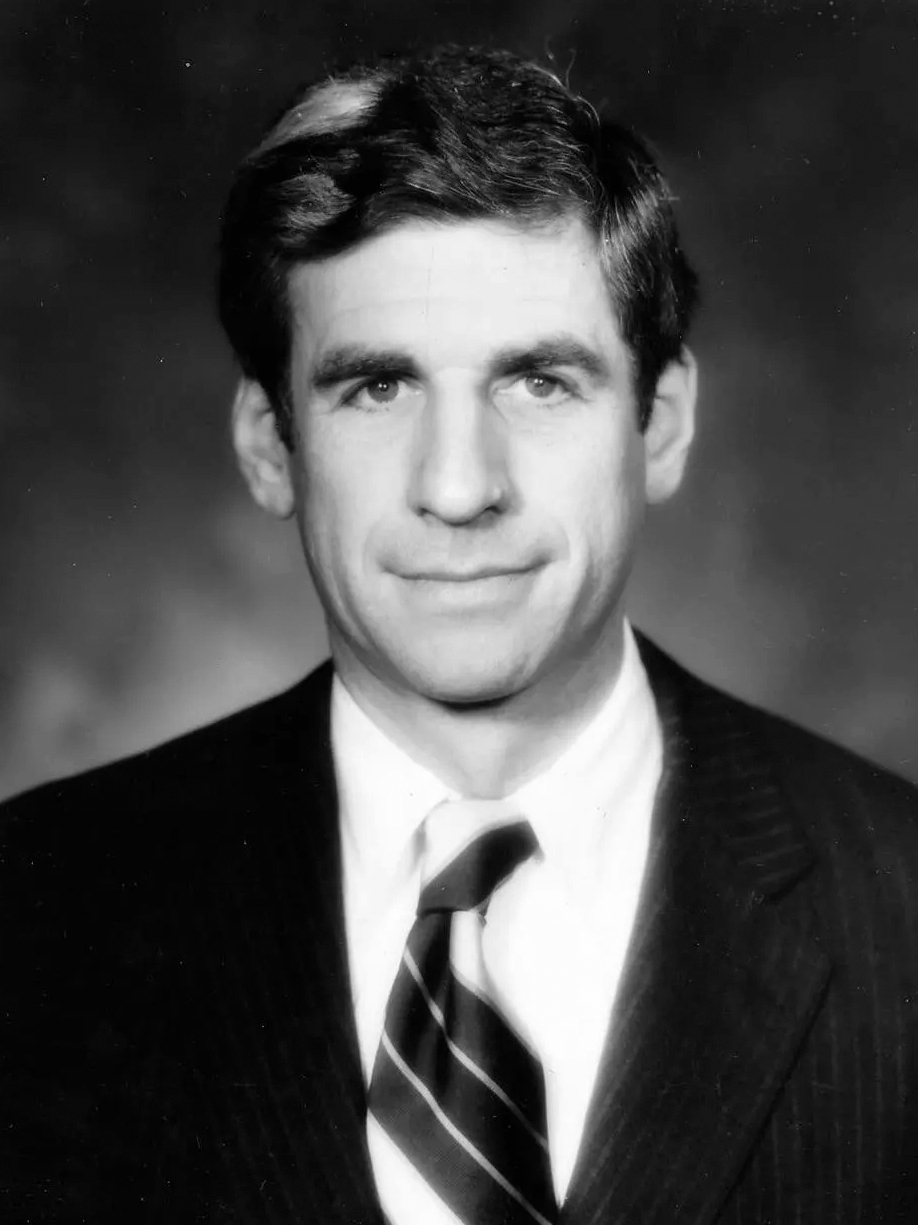

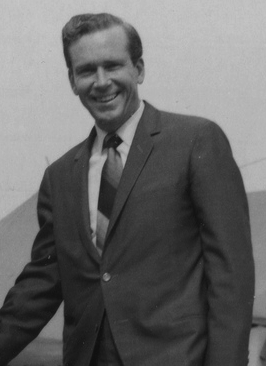
Nominee	John Danforth	Warren E. Hearnes
Party	Republican	Democratic
Popular vote	1,090,067	813,571
Percentage	56.9%	42.5%
- County results Danforth: 50-60% 60-70% 70-80% Hearnes: 50–60% 60–70% 70–80%
U.S. senator before election
Stuart Symington
Democratic
Elected U.S. senator
John Danforth
Republican

Incumbent Democrat Stuart Symington retired, instead of seeking a fifth term. Republican John Danforth, attorney general of Missouri, won the open seat, defeating Democrat Warren Hearnes, former governor of Missouri. (Jerry Litton had won the Democratic nomination earlier, but was killed in a plane crash, and Hearnes was chosen by the party committee.)

General election results
Party	Candidate	Votes	%
Republican	John Danforth	1,090,067	56.94
Democratic	Warren E. Hearnes	813,571	42.50
Independent	Lawrence "Red" Petty	10,822	0.57
Majority		276,496	14.44
Turnout		1,914,460	
Republican gain from Democratic			

== Montana ==
Montana election
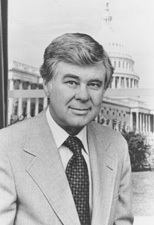

Nominee	John Melcher	Stanley Burger
Party	Democratic	Republican
Popular vote	206,232	115,213
Percentage	64.16%	35.84%
- County results Melcher: 50–60% 60–70% 70–80% 80–90% Burger: 50-60%
U.S. senator before election
Mike Mansfield
Democratic
Elected U.S. senator
John Melcher
Democratic

Rather than seek a fifth term, Democratic incumbent Mike Mansfield opted to retire, creating an open seat. United States Congressman John Melcher, who had represented Montana's 2nd congressional district from 1969 to 1977, won the Democratic nomination and defeated Stanley C. Burger, the Republican nominee and former executive officer of the Montana Farm Bureau Federation, by a wide margin in the general election.

Democratic Party primary results
Party	Candidate	Votes	%
Democratic	Jack Melcher	89,413	88.52
Democratic	Ray E. Gulick	11,593	11.48
Total votes		101,006	100.00

Republican primary results
Party	Candidate	Votes	%
Republican	Stanley C. Burger	32,313	40.41
Republican	Dave Drum	27,257	34.09
Republican	Jack Tierney	15,129	18.92
Republican	Larry L. Gilbert	5,258	6.58
Total votes		79,957	100.00

1976 United States Senate election in Montana
Party	Candidate	Votes	%	±%
Democratic	John Melcher	206,232	64.16	+3.62%
Republican	Stanley C. Burger	115,213	35.84	−3.62%
Majority		91,019	28.32	+7.24%
Turnout		321,445		
Democratic hold		Swing		

== Nebraska ==
Nebraska election
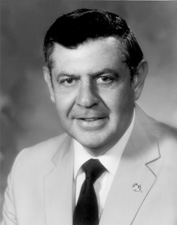

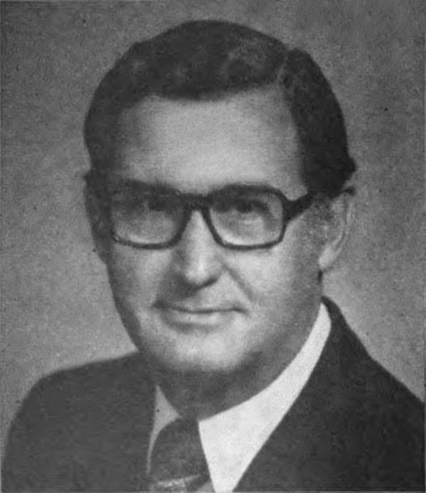
Nominee	Edward Zorinsky	John Y. McCollister
Party	Democratic	Republican
Popular vote	313,805	279,284
Percentage	52.89%	47.07%
- County results Zorinsky: 50–60% 60–70% 70–80% >90% McCollister: 50-60% 60-70% 70-80%
U.S. senator before election
Roman Hruska
Republican
Elected U.S. senator
Edward Zorinsky
Democratic

Incumbent Republican Roman Hruska retired instead of seeking another term. Democrat Edward Zorinsky, mayor of Omaha, won the open seat over Republican John Y. McCollister, U.S. congressman of Nebraska's 2nd congressional district.

General election results
Party	Candidate	Votes	%
Democratic	Edward Zorinsky	313,805	52.89
Republican	John Y. McCollister	279,284	47.07
Write-in candidate	Lenore Etchison	58	0.01
N/A	Others	163	0.03
Majority		34,521	5.82
Turnout		593,310	
Democratic gain from Republican			

== Nevada ==
Nevada election
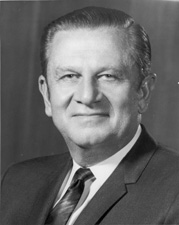

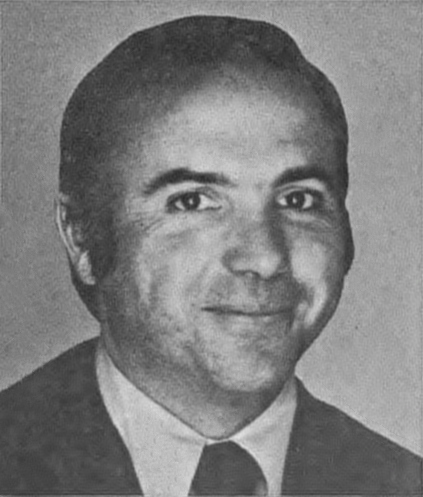
Nominee	Howard Cannon	David Towell
Party	Democratic	Republican
Popular vote	127,214	63,471
Percentage	63.0%	31.4%
- County results Cannon: 40–50% 50–60% 60–70% 70–80% Towell: 40–50%
U.S. senator before election
Howard Cannon
Democratic
Elected U.S. senator
Howard Cannon
Democratic

Incumbent Democrat Howard Cannon won re-election to a fourth term over Republican David Towell, U.S. representative from Nevada's at-large congressional district.

In the Senate, Cannon was known as a moderate in the Democratic Party. He served as chairman of several committees, including the rules committee and the inaugural arrangements committee. Cannon was nearly defeated for re-election in 1964 by Republican Lieutenant Governor Paul Laxalt in one of the closest elections in history. However, he became more popular over the next few years and won re-election in 1970 with nearly 58% of the vote. In 1976, he faced U.S. Representative David Towell, who served just one term in the U.S. House of Representatives before running for the U.S. Senate. Cannon won re-election with 63% of the vote, one of the best election performances of his career. He won every county in the state, except for Eureka County, which Towell won with just 51% of the vote.

General election results
Party	Candidate	Votes	%	±%
Democratic	Howard Cannon (incumbent)	127,214	63.01	+5.36%
Republican	David Towell	63,471	31.44	−9.73%
None of These Candidates		5,288	2.62	
Independent American	Byron D. Young	3,619	1.79	
Libertarian	Dan Becan	2,307	1.14	
Majority		63,743	31.57	+15.09%
Turnout		201,899		
Democratic hold		Swing		

== New Jersey ==
New Jersey election
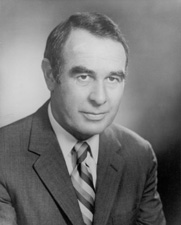

Nominee	Harrison A. Williams	David A. Norcross
Party	Democratic	Republican
Popular vote	1,681,140	1,054,508
Percentage	60.66%	38.05%
- County results Williams: 50–60% 60–70%
U.S. senator before election
Harrison A. Williams
Democratic
Elected U.S. Senator
Harrison A. Williams
Democratic

Harrison A. Williams, the incumbent originally elected in 1958, elected to run for a fourth term. He defeated anti-abortion activist Stephen J. Foley handily in the Democratic primary with 85% of the vote. David A. Norcross won the Republican primary with the endorsement of the New Jersey Republican Party with 68% of the vote.

In the general election, Williams soundly won re-election to a fourth term over Norcross. He won 60% of the vote, winning every county in the state. This would be Williams' last election to the U.S. Senate, as he would resign in 1981 following his involvement in the Abscam scandal.

1976 United States Senate election in New Jersey results
Party	Candidate	Votes	%
Democratic	Harrison A. Williams (incumbent)	1,681,140	60.66
Republican	David A. Norcross	1,054,508	38.05
Libertarian	Hannibal Cundari	19,907	0.72
Socialist Labor	Bernardo S. Doganiero	9,185	0.33
Labor Party	Leif Johnson	6,650	0.24
Majority		626,632	22.61
Turnout		2,771,390	
Democratic hold			

== New Mexico ==
New Mexico election
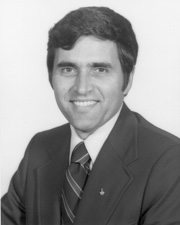

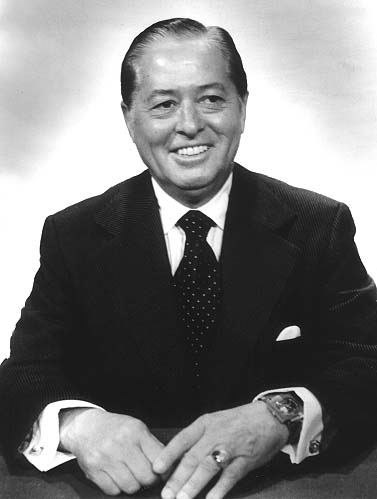
Nominee	Harrison Schmitt	Joseph Montoya
Party	Republican	Democratic
Popular vote	234,681	176,382
Percentage	56.8%	42.7%
- County results Schmitt: 50–60% 60–70% Montoya: 50–60%
U.S. senator before election
Joseph Montoya
Democratic
Elected U.S. senator
Harrison Schmitt
Republican

Incumbent Democrat Joseph Montoya ran for re-election to a third term, but was defeated by Republican former astronaut Harrison Schmitt.

General election results
Party	Candidate	Votes	%	±%
Republican	Harrison Schmitt	234,681	56.82	+9.69%
Democratic	Joseph Montoya (incumbent)	176,382	42.70	−10.17%
Raza Unida	Ernesto B. Borunda	1,087	0.26	
American Independent	Matt Dillion	906	0.22	
Majority		58,299	14.11	+8.36%
Turnout		413,056		
Republican gain from Democratic		Swing		

== New York ==
New York election
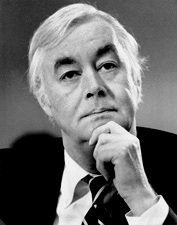

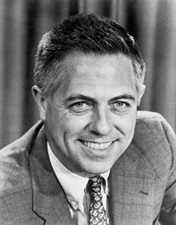
Nominee	Daniel Patrick Moynihan	James Buckley
Party	Democratic	Republican
Popular vote	3,422,594	2,836,633
Percentage	54.1%	44.9%
- County results Moynihan: 50–60% 60–70% 70–80% Buckley: 50–60% 60–70% 70–80%
U.S. senator before election
James Buckley
Republican
Elected U.S. senator
Daniel Patrick Moynihan
Democratic

Incumbent Conservative James Buckley ran for re-election to a second term as a Republican, but was defeated by Daniel Patrick Moynihan.

Democratic Party convention results
Party	Candidate	Votes	%
Democratic	Paul O'Dwyer		32.50
Democratic	Daniel Patrick Moynihan		31.10
Democratic	Bella Abzug		28.70
Democratic	Ramsey Clark		7.00
Democratic	Abraham Hirschfeld		0.70
Total votes			100.00

Democratic Party primary results
Party	Candidate	Votes	%
Democratic	Daniel Patrick Moynihan	333,697	36.41
Democratic	Bella Abzug	323,705	35.32
Democratic	Ramsey Clark	94,191	10.28
Democratic	Paul O'Dwyer	82,689	9.02
Democratic	Abraham Hirschfeld	82,331	8.98
Total votes		916,613	100.00

Republican Party primary results
Party	Candidate	Votes	%
Republican	James Buckley (incumbent)	242,257	70.45
Republican	Peter Peyser	101,629	29.55
Total votes		343,886	100.00

General election results
Party	Candidate	Votes	%	±%
Democratic	Daniel Patrick Moynihan	3,238,511		
Liberal	Daniel Patrick Moynihan	184,083		
total	Daniel Patrick Moynihan	3,422,594	54.17	+ 17.21
Republican	James Buckley (incumbent)	2,525,139		
Conservative	James Buckley	311,494		
total	James Buckley	2,836,633	44.90	+ 5.95
Communist	Herbert Aptheker	25,141	0.40	+ 0.37
Socialist Workers	Marcia Gallo	16,350	0.26	+ 0.20
Libertarian	Martin E. Nixon	10,943	0.17	+ 0.17
U.S. Labor	Elijah C. Boyd	6,716	0.11	+ 0.11
Majority		675,961	9.27	
Turnout		6,408,377		
Democratic gain from Republican		Swing		

== North Dakota ==
North Dakota election
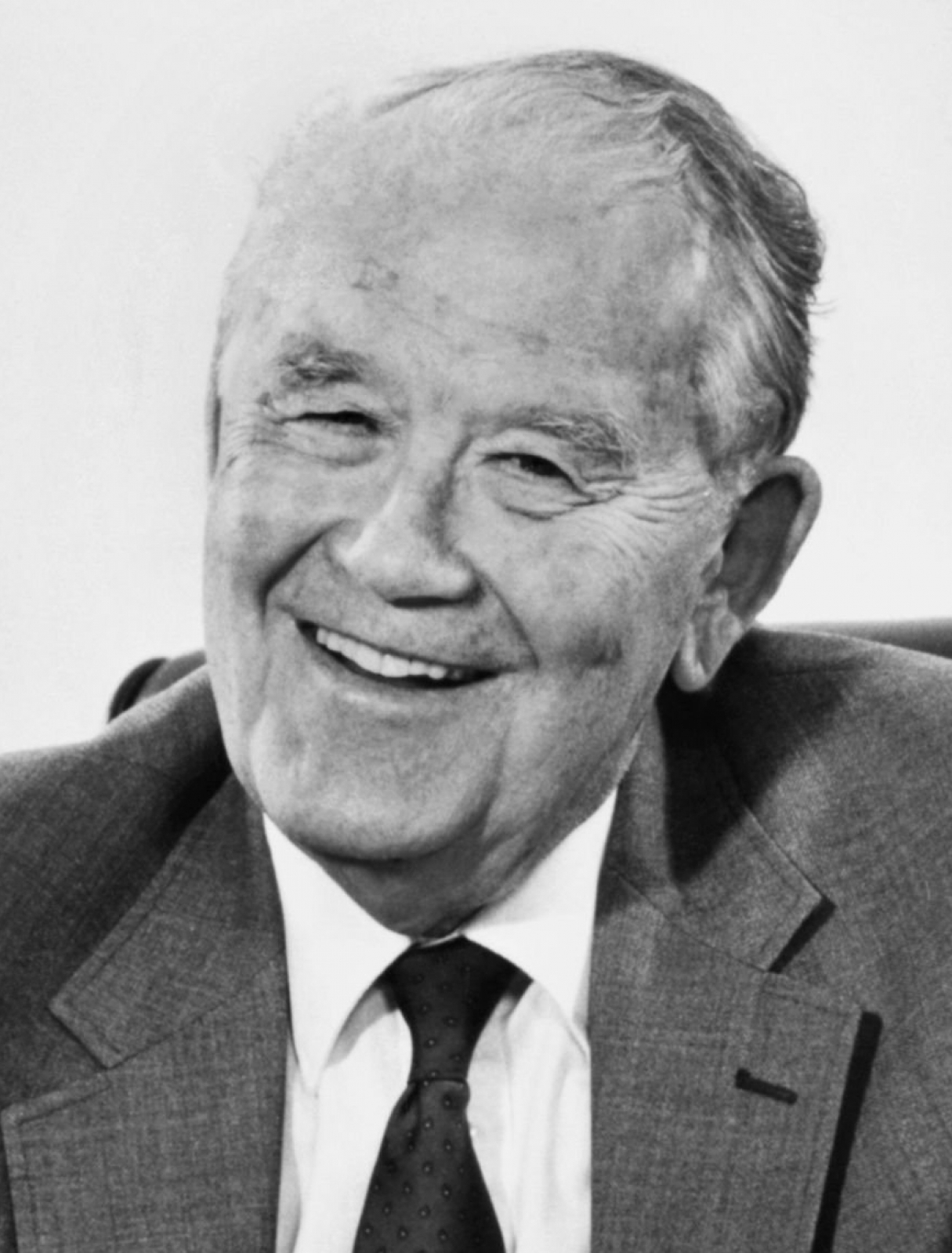

Nominee	Quentin Burdick	Robert Stroup
Party	Democratic–NPL	Republican
Popular vote	175,772	103,466
Percentage	62.10%	36.55%
- County results Burdick: 50–60% 60–70% 70–80% Stroup: 50–60%
U.S. Senator before election
Quentin Burdick
Democratic
Elected U.S. Senator
Quentin Burdick
Democratic

Incumbent North Dakota Democratic NPL Party Democrat Quentin Burdick sought and received re-election to his fourth term to the United States Senate, defeating Republican candidate Robert Stroup. Only Burdick filed as a Dem-NPLer, and the endorsed Republican candidate was Robert Stroup, as state senator from Hazen, North Dakota. Burdick and Stroup won the primary elections for their respective parties. One independent candidate, Clarence Haggard, also filed before the deadline under the American Party.

North Dakota U.S. Senate election
Party	Candidate	Votes	%
Democratic	Quentin Burdick (incumbent)	175,772	62.10
Republican	Robert Stroup	103,466	36.55
Independent	Clarence Haggard	3,824	1.35
Turnout		283,062	
Democratic hold			

== Ohio ==
Ohio election
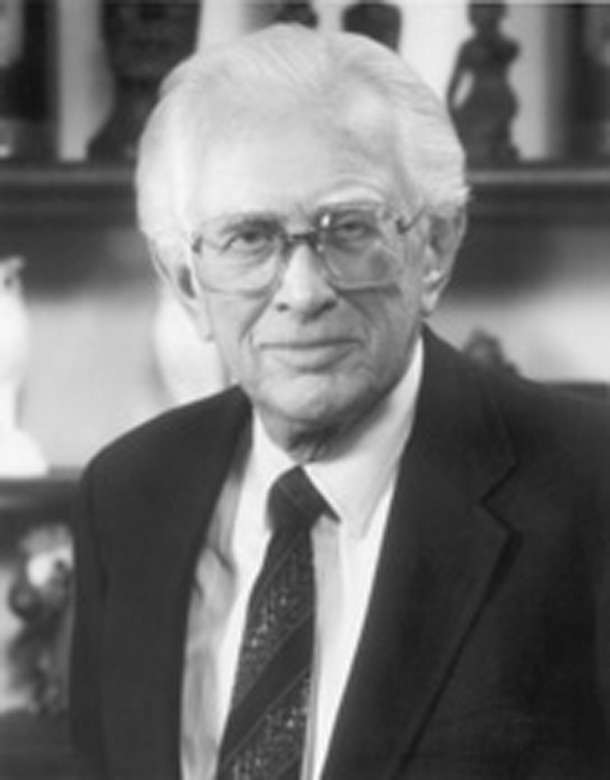

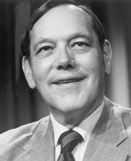
Nominee	Howard Metzenbaum	Robert Taft Jr.
Party	Democratic	Republican
Popular vote	1,941,113	1,823,774
Percentage	49.51%	46.52%
- County results Metzenbaum: 40–50% 50–60% 60–70% Taft: 40–50% 50–60% 60–70%
U.S. senator before election
Robert Taft Jr.
Republican
Elected U.S. senator
Howard Metzenbaum
Democratic

Incumbent Republican Robert Taft Jr. ran for re-election to second term, but was defeated by Democratic former senator Howard Metzenbaum.

General election results
Party	Candidate	Votes	%
Democratic	Howard Metzenbaum	1,941,113	49.51
Republican	Robert Taft Jr. (incumbent)	1,823,774	46.52
Independent	John O'Neill	53,657	1.37
American Independent	Donald E. Babcock	36,979	0.94
Independent	Emma Lila Fundaburk	33,285	0.85
Socialist Workers	Melissa Singler	31,805	0.81
Majority		117,339	2.99
Turnout		3,920,613	
Democratic gain from Republican			

== Pennsylvania ==
Pennsylvania election
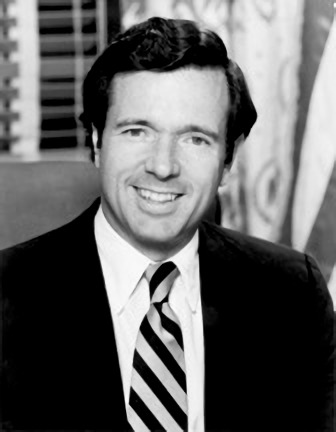

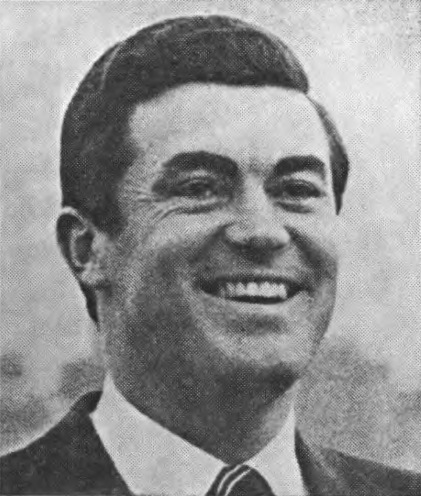
Nominee	John Heinz	Bill Green
Party	Republican	Democratic
Popular vote	2,381,891	2,126,977
Percentage	52.4%	46.8%
- County results Heinz: 50–60% 60–70% Green: 40–50% 50–60% 70–80%
U.S. senator before election
Hugh Scott
Republican
Elected U.S. senator
John Heinz
Republican

Incumbent Republican and Minority Leader Hugh Scott retired. Republican John Heinz won the open seat over Democrat Bill Green, United States representative.

In December 1975, U.S. Senator Hugh Scott announced that he would not seek re-election in 1976 at the age of 75 after serving in Congress for 33 years. Scott listed personal reasons and several "well-qualified potential candidates" for the seat among the reasons of his decision to retire. Other reasons, including his support for Richard Nixon and accusations that he had illegally obtained contributions from Gulf Oil, were alleged to have contributed to the decision.

Democratic primary results
Party	Candidate	Votes	%
Democratic	William J. Green III	762,733	68.71
Democratic	Jeanette Reibman	345,264	31.10
Democratic	Others	2,058	0.19

Republican primary results
Party	Candidate	Votes	%
Republican	John Heinz	358,715	37.73
Republican	Arlen Specter	332,513	34.98
Republican	George Packard	160,379	16.87
Republican	Others	99,074	10.43

Heinz was the victor in all but nine counties, defeating opponent William Green, who had a 300,000-vote advantage in his native Philadelphia area. Heinz and Green spent $2.5 million and $900,000, respectively, during the ten-month campaign. Much of the money Heinz spent on his campaign was his own, leading to accusations from Green that he was "buying the seat". Heinz replied by claiming that the spending was necessary to overcome the Democratic voter registration advantage.

General election results
Party	Candidate	Votes	%	±%
Republican	John Heinz	2,381,891	52.39	+0.96%
Democratic	William J. Green III	2,126,977	46.79	+1.41%
Constitution	Andrew J. Watson	26,028	0.57	−1.79%
Socialist Workers	Frederick W. Stanton	5,484	0.12	+0.01%
Labor Party	Bernard Salera	3,637	0.08	+0.08%
Communist Party	Frank Kinces	2,097	0.05	+0.05%
N/A	Other	239	0.00	N/A
Turnout		4,546,353		{{{change}}}
Majority		254,914	6.60	{{{change}}}
Republican hold		Swing		

== Rhode Island ==
Rhode Island election
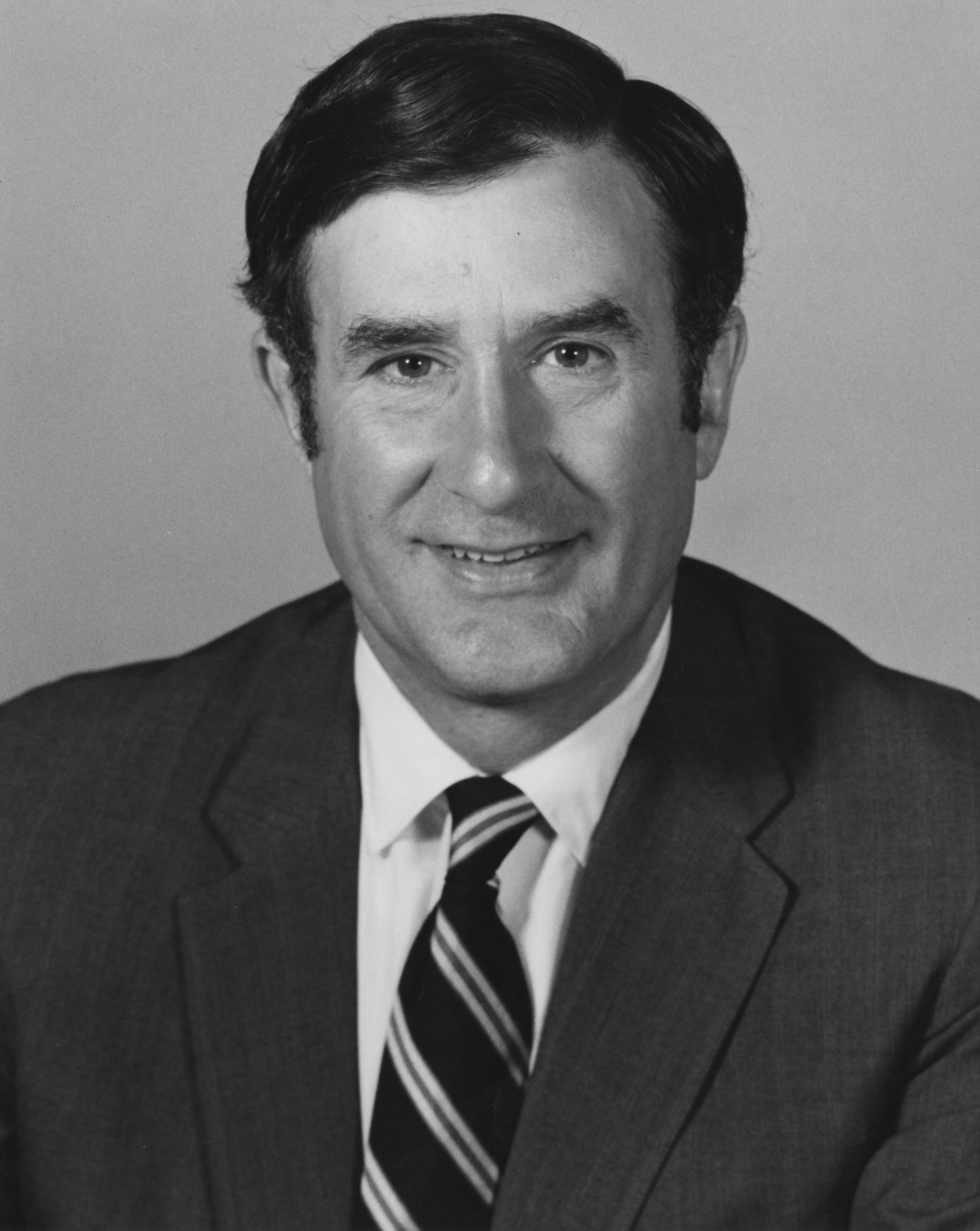

Nominee	John Chafee	Richard Lorber
Party	Republican	Democratic
Popular vote	230,329	167,665
Percentage	57.7%	42.0%
- Chafee: 50–60% 60–70% 70–80% Lorber: 50–60%
U.S. senator before election
John O. Pastore
Democratic
Elected U.S. senator
John Chafee
Republican

Incumbent Democrat John O. Pastore did not seek re-election. Republican John Chafee won the seat, defeating Democrat Richard P. Lorber.

Democratic primary results
Party	Candidate	Votes	%
Democratic	Richard P. Lorber	60,118	37.78
Democratic	Philip W. Noel	60,018	37.71
Democratic	John P. Hawkins	25,456	16.00
Democratic	Paul E. Goulding	5,500	3.46
Democratic	Ralph J. Perrotta	4,481	2.82
Democratic	John E. Caddick	2,160	1.36
Democratic	Earl F. Pasbach	962	0.60
Democratic	Arthur E. Marley	447	0.28
Majority		100	0.06
Total votes		159,142	100.00

General election results
Party	Candidate	Votes	%
Republican	John Chafee	230,329	57.74
Democratic	Richard P. Lorber	167,665	42.03
Communist	Margaret Cann	912	0.23
Majority		62,664	15.71
Total votes		398,906	100.00
Republican gain from Democratic			

== Tennessee ==
Tennessee election
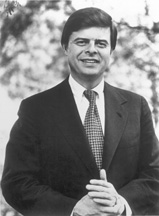

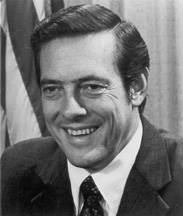
Nominee	James Sasser	Bill Brock
Party	Democratic	Republican
Popular vote	751,180	673,231
Percentage	52.46%	47.01%
- County results Sasser: 50–60% 60–70% 70–80% 80–90% Brock: 50–60% 60–70% 70–80%
U.S. senator before election
Bill Brock
Republican
Elected U.S. senator
James Sasser
Democratic

Incumbent Republican Bill Brock ran for re-election to a second term, but was defeated by Democratic challenger James Sasser.

General election results
Party	Candidate	Votes	%	±%
Democratic	James Sasser	751,180	52.46	
Republican	Bill Brock (incumbent)	673,231	47.01	−5.44%
Independent	Mark Clark Bates	5,137	0.36	
Independent	Willie C. Jacox	1,406	0.10	
Independent	Arnold Joseph Zandie	1,061	0.07	
None	Write-ins	31	0.00	
Majority		77,949	5.45	
Turnout		1,432,046		
Democratic gain from Republican		Swing		

== Texas ==
Texas election
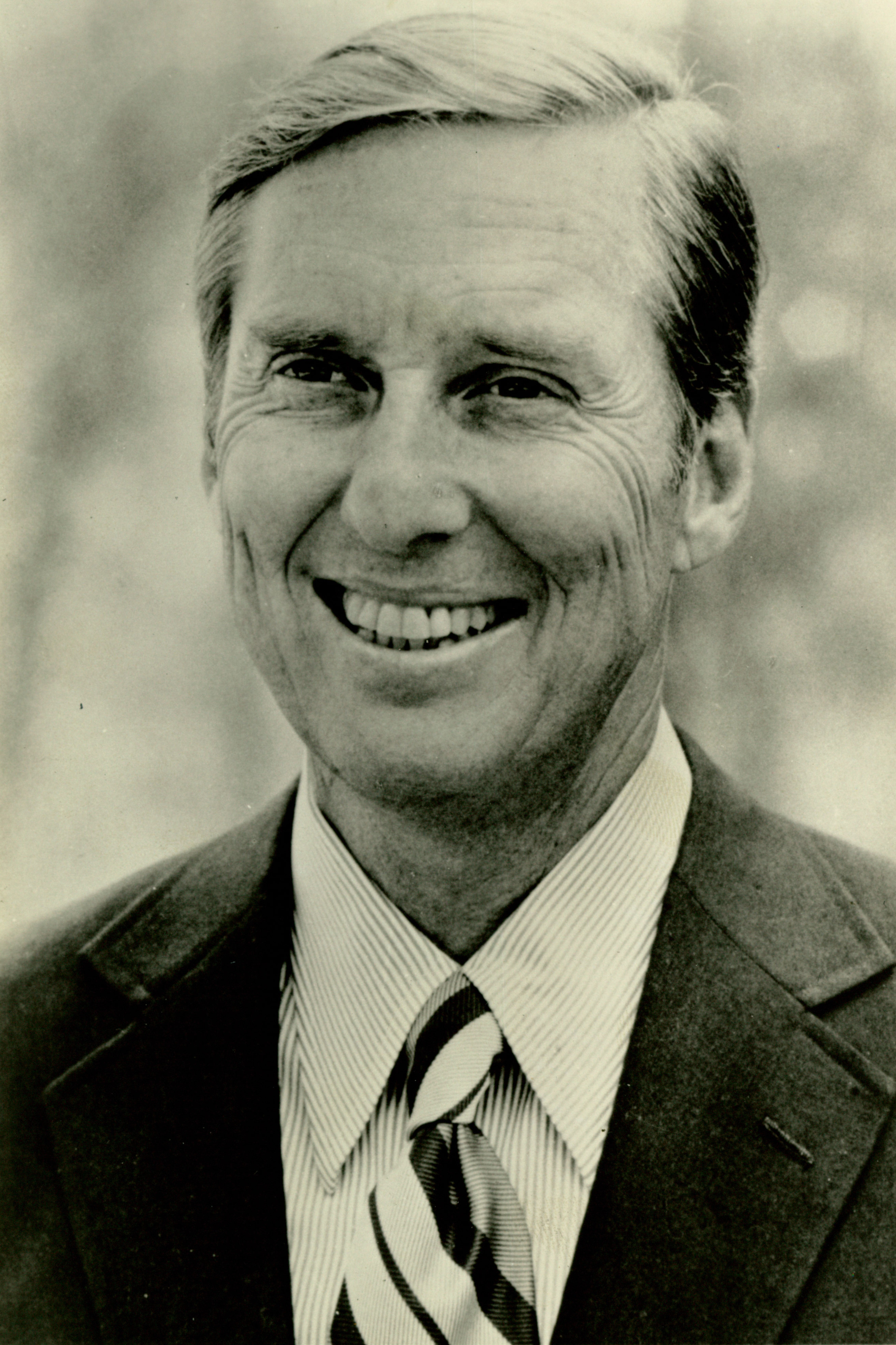

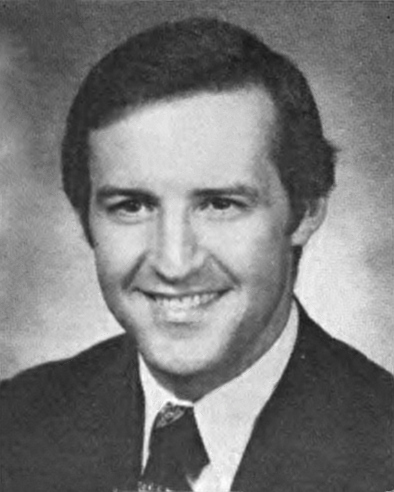
Nominee	Lloyd Bentsen	Alan Steelman
Party	Democratic	Republican
Popular vote	2,199,956	1,636,370
Percentage	56.8%	42.2%
- County results Bentsen: 50–60% 60–70% 70–80% 80–90% >90% Steelman: 50–60% 60–70%
U.S. senator before election
Lloyd Bentsen
Democratic
Elected U.S. senator
Lloyd Bentsen
Democratic

Incumbent Democrat Lloyd Bentsen won re-election to a second term over Republican Alan Steelman, U.S. representative from Texas's 5th district.

General election results
Party	Candidate	Votes	%
Democratic	Lloyd Bentsen (incumbent)	2,199,956	56.8
Republican	Alan Steelman	1,636,370	42.2
Socialist Workers Party	Pedro Vasquez	20,549	0.5
American Independent	Marjorie P. Gallion	17,355	0.5
Majority		563,586	14.6
Turnout		3,874,230	
Democratic hold			

== Utah ==
Utah election
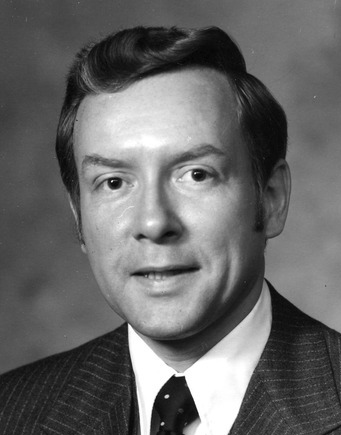

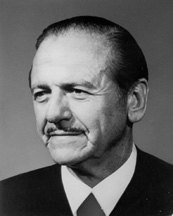
Nominee	Orrin Hatch	Frank Moss
Party	Republican	Democratic
Popular vote	290,221	241,948
Percentage	53.7%	44.8%
- County results Hatch: 40–50% 50-60% 60-70% 70-80% Moss: 50–60% 60–70%
U.S. senator before election
Frank Moss
Democratic
Elected U.S. senator
Orrin Hatch
Republican

Incumbent Democrat Frank Moss ran for re-election to a fourth term but was defeated by his Republican opponent, Orrin Hatch.

1976 United States Senate election in Utah
Party	Candidate	Votes	%	±%
Republican	Orrin Hatch	290,221	53.73%	
Democratic	Frank Moss (incumbent)	241,948	44.80%	
Independent American	George M. Batchelor	4,913	0.91%	
Libertarian	Steve Trotter	3,026	0.56%	
Majority		48,273	8.93%	
Turnout		540,108		
Republican gain from Democratic		Swing		

== Vermont ==
Vermont election
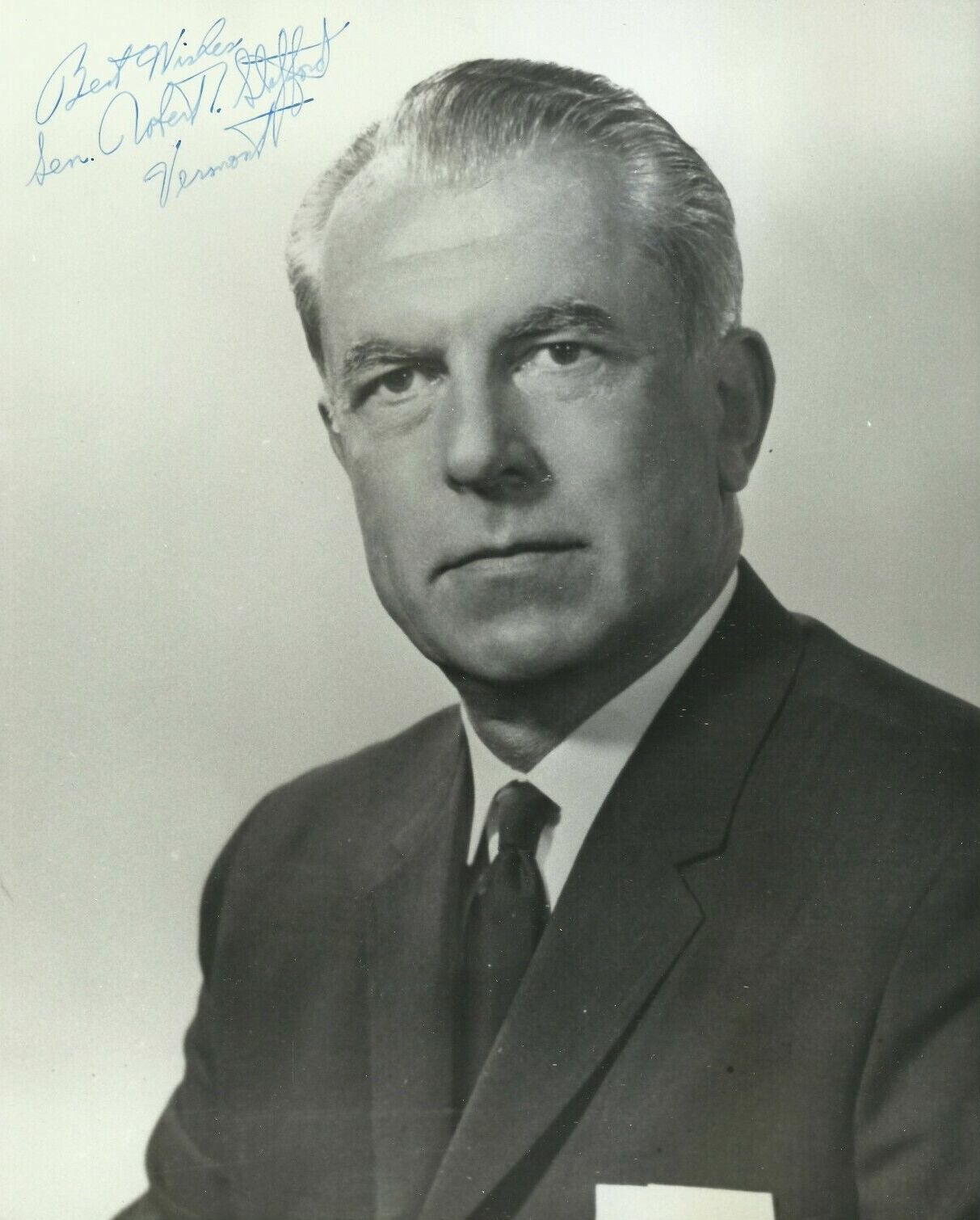

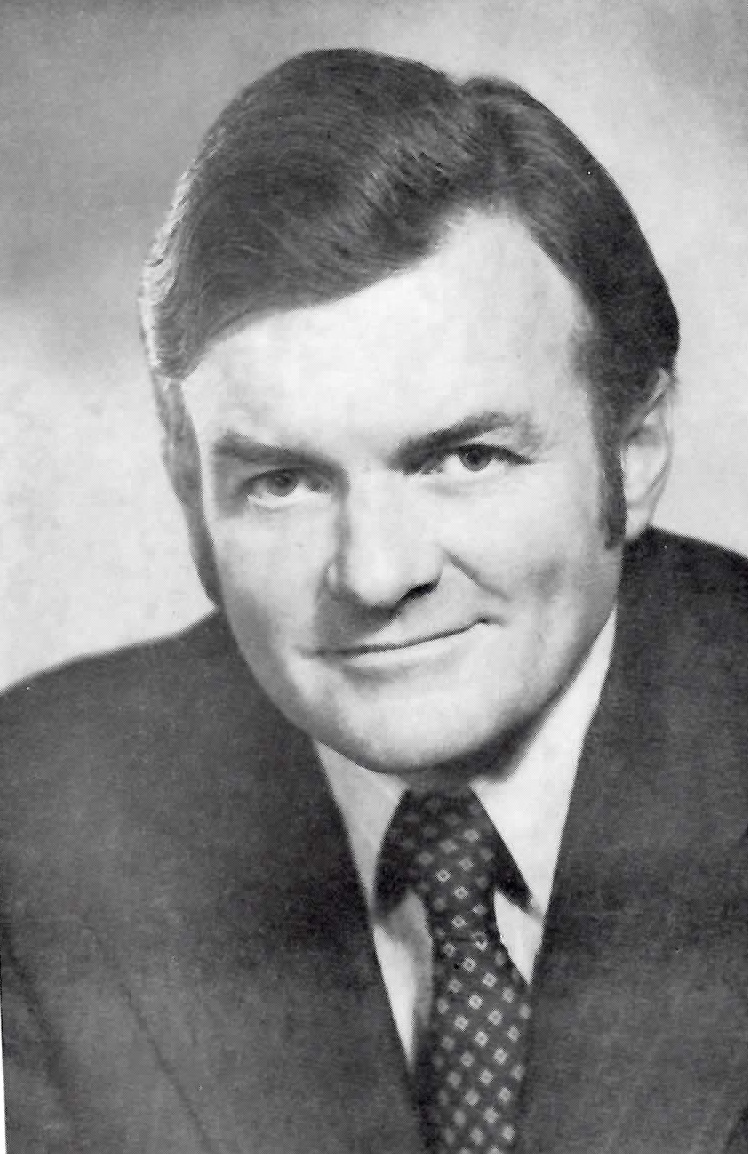
Nominee	Robert Stafford	Thomas P. Salmon
Party	Republican	Democratic
Popular vote	94,481	85,682
Percentage	50.0%	45.3%
- Stafford: 40-50% 50-60% 60-70% 70-80% Salmon: 40-50% 50-60% 60-70%
U.S. senator before election
Robert Stafford
Republican
Elected U.S. senator
Robert Stafford
Republican

Incumbent Republican Robert Stafford successfully ran for re-election to another term in the United States Senate, defeating Democratic candidate Governor Thomas P. Salmon.

Republican primary results
Party	Candidate	Votes	%
Republican	Robert Stafford (incumbent)	24,338	68.7
Republican	John J. Welch	10,911	30.8
Republican	Other	178	0.5
Total votes		35,427	100

Democratic primary results
Party	Candidate	Votes	%
Democratic	Thomas P. Salmon	21,674	52.7
Democratic	Scott Skinner	19,238	46.8
Democratic	Other	178	0.4
Total votes		41,090	100

1976 United States Senate election in Vermont
Party	Candidate	Votes	%
Republican	Robert Stafford (incumbent)	94,481	50.0
Democratic	Thomas P. Salmon	82,174	43.5
Independent Vermonters	Thomas P. Salmon	3,508	1.9
Total	Thomas P. Salmon	85,682	45.4
Liberty Union	Nancy Kaufman	8,801	4.7
N/A	Other	96	0.1
Total votes		189,060	100
Majority		12,307	6.5
Republican hold			

== Virginia ==
Virginia election
- Turnout: 47.0%
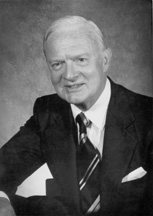

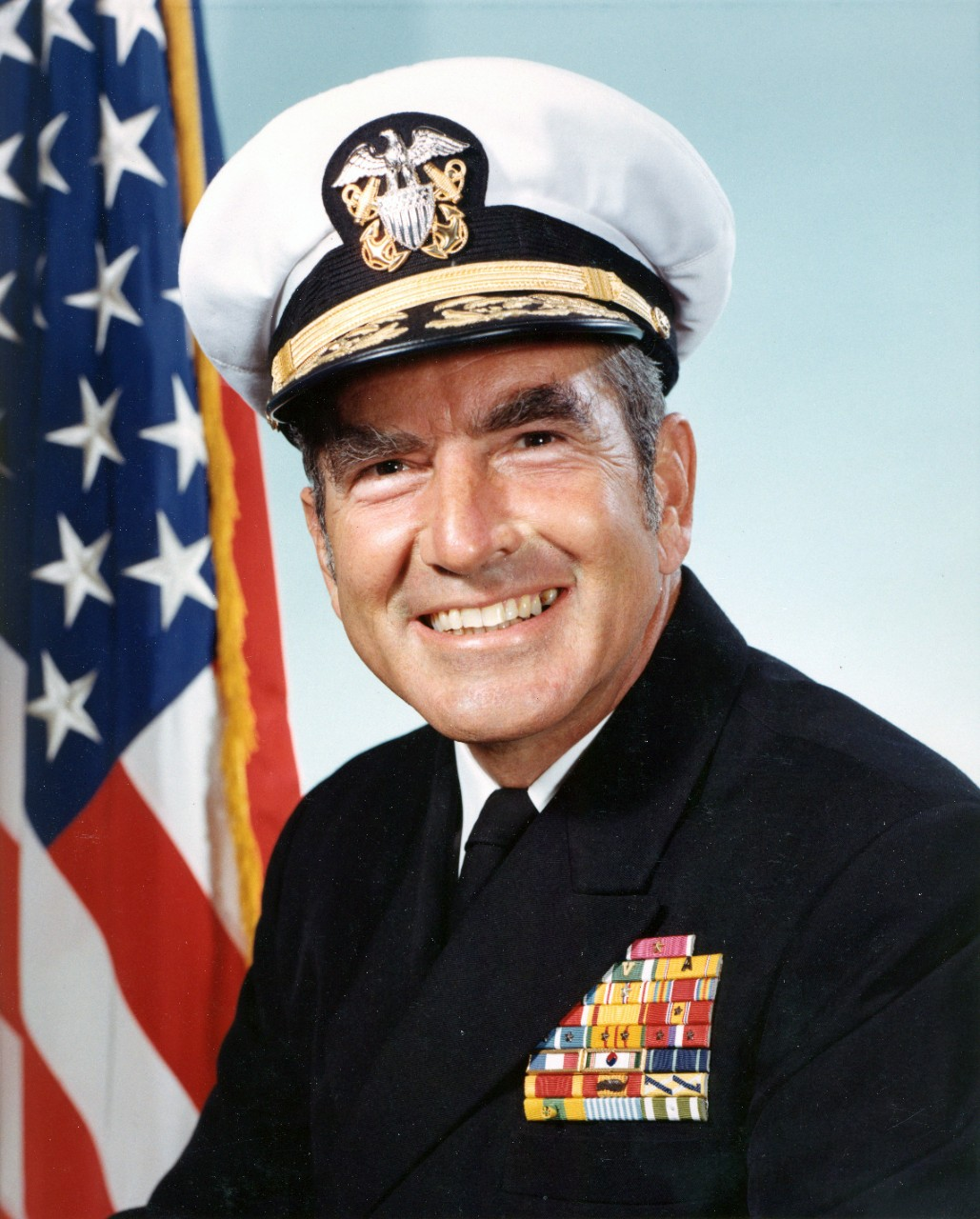
Nominee	Harry F. Byrd Jr.	Elmo Zumwalt
Party	Independent	Democratic
Popular vote	890,778	596,009
Percentage	57.2%	38.3%
- County and independent city results Byrd: 40–50% 50–60% 60–70% 70–80% 80–90% Zumwalt: 40–50% 50–60% 60–70% Perper: 40–50%
U.S. senator before election
Harry F. Byrd Jr.
Independent
Elected U.S. senator
Harry F. Byrd Jr.
Independent

Incumbent Independent Harry F. Byrd Jr. was re-elected to a second term over retired Admiral Elmo Zumwalt and state legislator Martin H. Perper.

1976 United States Senate election in Virginia
Party	Candidate	Votes	%	±%
Independent	Harry F. Byrd Jr. (incumbent)	890,778	57.19	+3.65%
Democratic	Elmo Zumwalt	596,009	38.27	+7.12%
Independent	Martin H. Perper	70,559	4.53	
Write-ins		154	0.01	
Majority		294,769	18.93	−3.45%
Turnout		1,557,500		
Independent hold				

== Washington ==
Washington Election
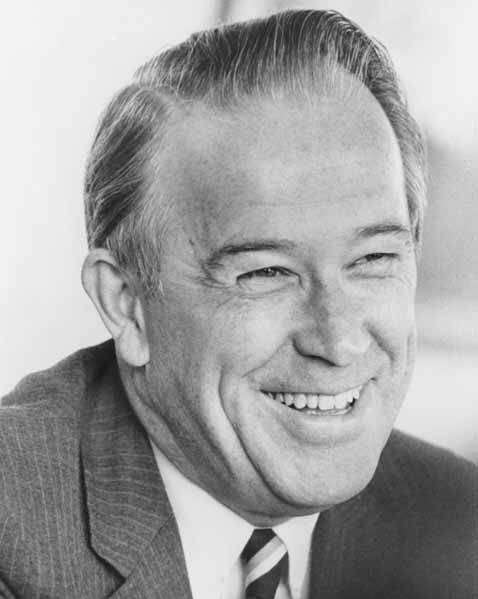

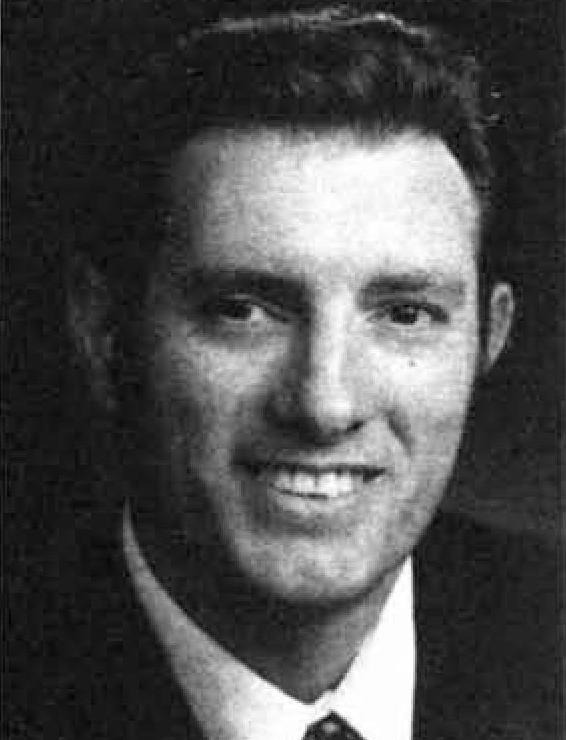
Nominee	Henry M. Jackson	George M. Brown
Party	Democratic	Republican
Popular vote	1,071,219	361,546
Percentage	71.84%	24.25%
- County results Jackson: 40–50% 50–60% 60–70% 70–80%
U.S. senator before election
Henry M. Jackson
Democratic
Elected U.S. senator
Henry M. Jackson
Democratic

1976 United States Senate election in Washington results
Party	Candidate	Votes	%
Democratic	Henry M. Jackson (incumbent)	1,071,219	71.84
Republican	George M. Brown	361,546	24.25
American Independent	Dave Smith	28,182	1.89
Libertarian	Richard K. Kenney	19,973	1.30
Socialist Workers	Karl Bermann	7,402	0.50
U.S. Labor	William F. Wertz Jr.	3,389	0.23
Majority		709,673	47.59
Turnout		1,491,111	
Democratic hold			

== West Virginia ==
West Virginia Election
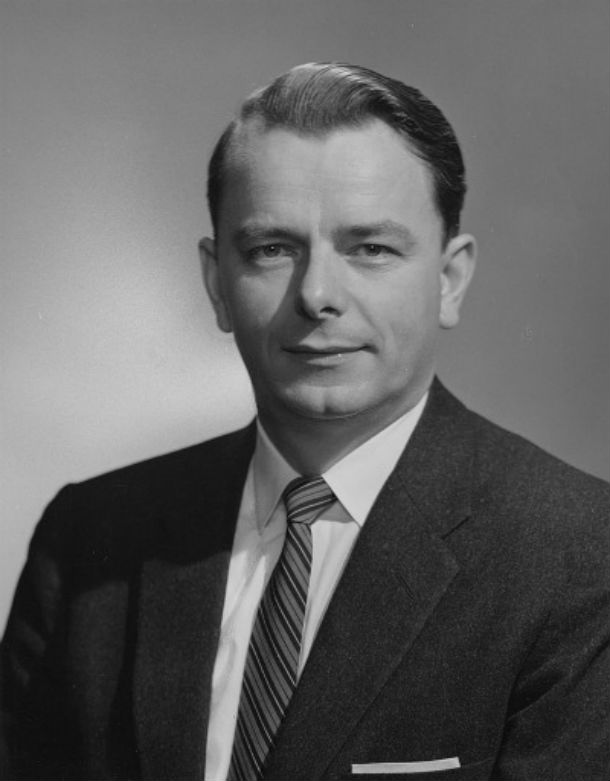
Nominee	Robert Byrd
Party	Democratic
Popular vote	566,359
Percentage	100.0%
- County results Byrd: 100%
U.S. senator before election
Robert Byrd
Democratic
Elected U.S. senator
Robert Byrd
Democratic

For most of the state's history, West Virginia has been a solidly Democratic state. Often, winning the Democratic primary was tantamount to winning the general election in the state. Despite West Virginia occasionally electing a Republican governor (Arch A. Moore Jr. and Cecil H. Underwood both served as governor) and voting for Dwight D. Eisenhower in 1956, West Virginia has only elected Democratic senators since 1958. Byrd had faced Republican opposition every term since he defeated Chapman Revercomb in 1958, but the Republicans chose not to mount a nominee in 1976. Freshman Congressman Cleve Benedict would serve as the Republican nominee in 1982.

1976 United States Senate election in West Virginia results
Party	Candidate	Votes	%
Democratic	Robert Byrd (incumbent)	566,359	100.00
Democratic hold			

== Wisconsin ==
Wisconsin election
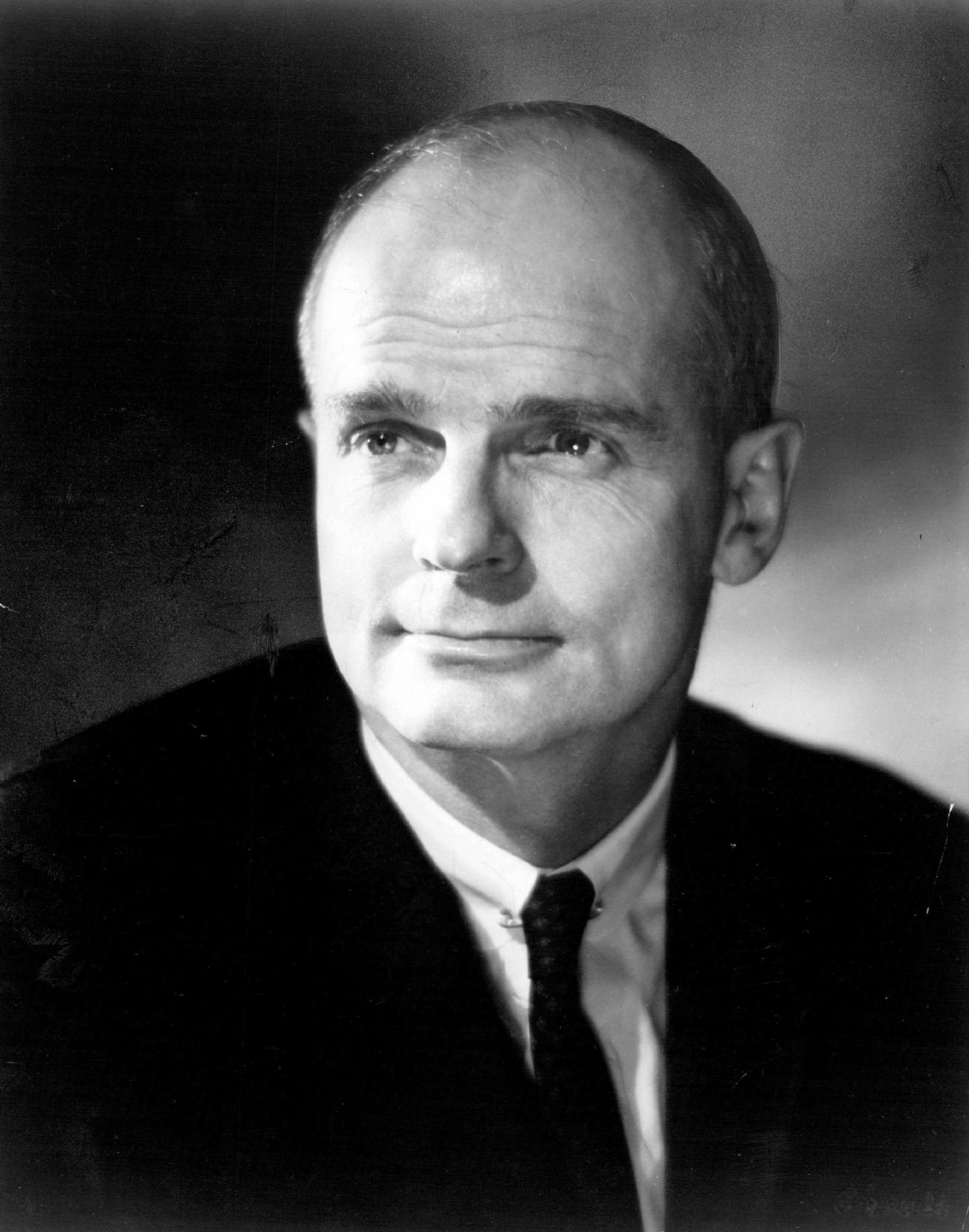

Nominee	William Proxmire	Stanley York
Party	Democratic	Republican
Popular vote	1,396,970	521,902
Percentage	72.20%	26.97%
- County results Proxmire: 50–60% 60–70% 70–80% 80–90%
U.S. senator before election
William Proxmire
Democratic
Elected U.S. Senator
William Proxmire
Democratic

Originally elected in 1957 to fill the seat of Joseph McCarthy, William Proxmire had won re-election three times prior to 1976. He only faced significant Republican opposition twice during his re-election years, winning 70% of the vote and every county in 1970. Clergyman Stanley York was the Republican nominee. Proxmire ultimately defeated York and increased his margin of victory by 4%. Proxmire would serve two more terms, ultimately retiring in 1989.

1976 United States Senate election in Wisconsin results
Party	Candidate	Votes	%
Democratic	William Proxmire (incumbent)	1,396,970	72.19
Republican	Stanley York	521,902	26.97
Democratic Socialist	William Osborne Hart	7,354	0.38
Socialist Workers	Robert Schwarz	4,876	0.25
Labor Party	Michael A. MacLaurin	2,148	0.11
Socialist Labor	Robert E. Nordlander	1,731	0.09
None	Write-ins	202	0.01
Majority		875,068	45.22
Turnout		1,935,183	
Democratic hold			

== Wyoming ==
1976 United States Senate election in Wyoming
- November 2, 1976
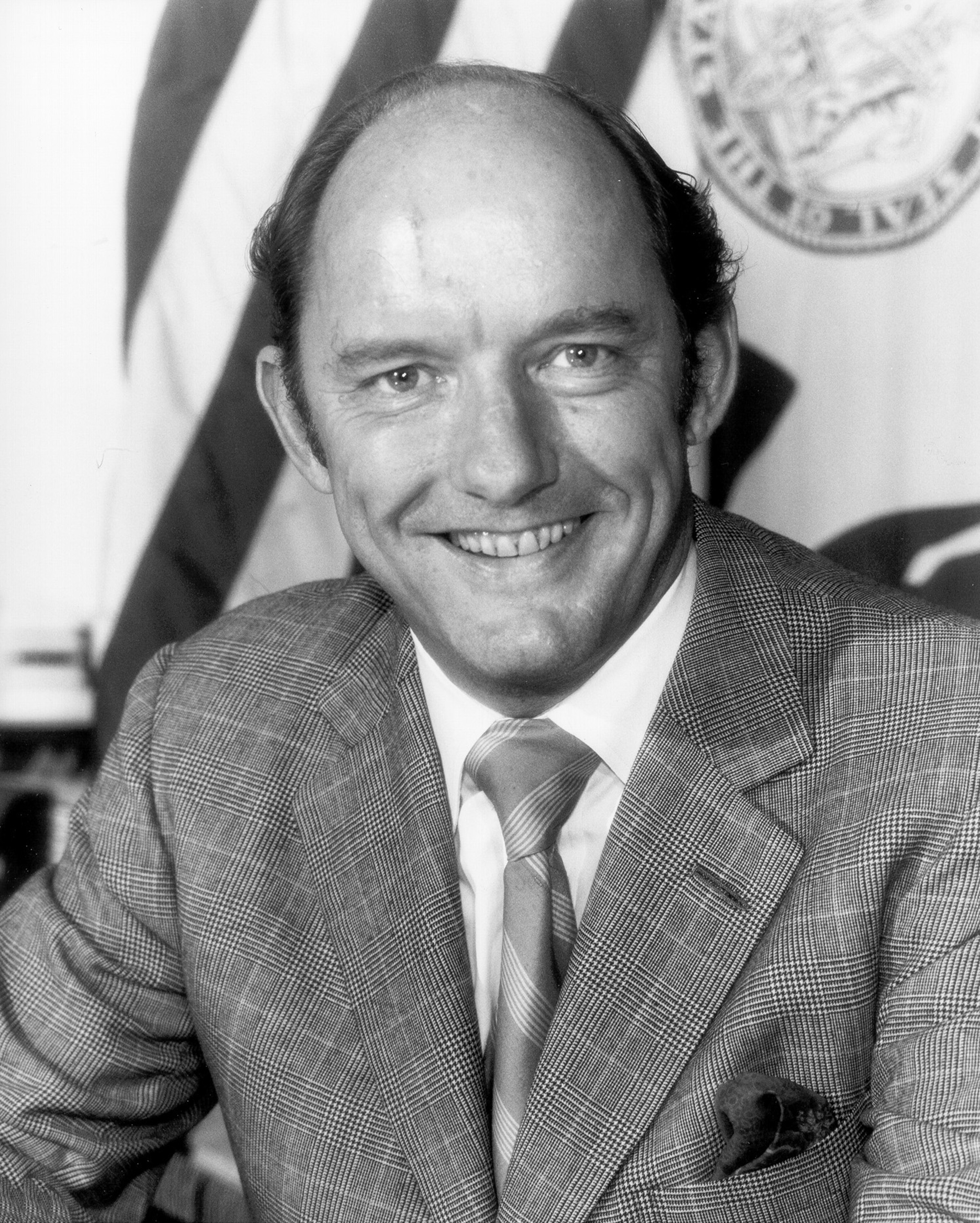

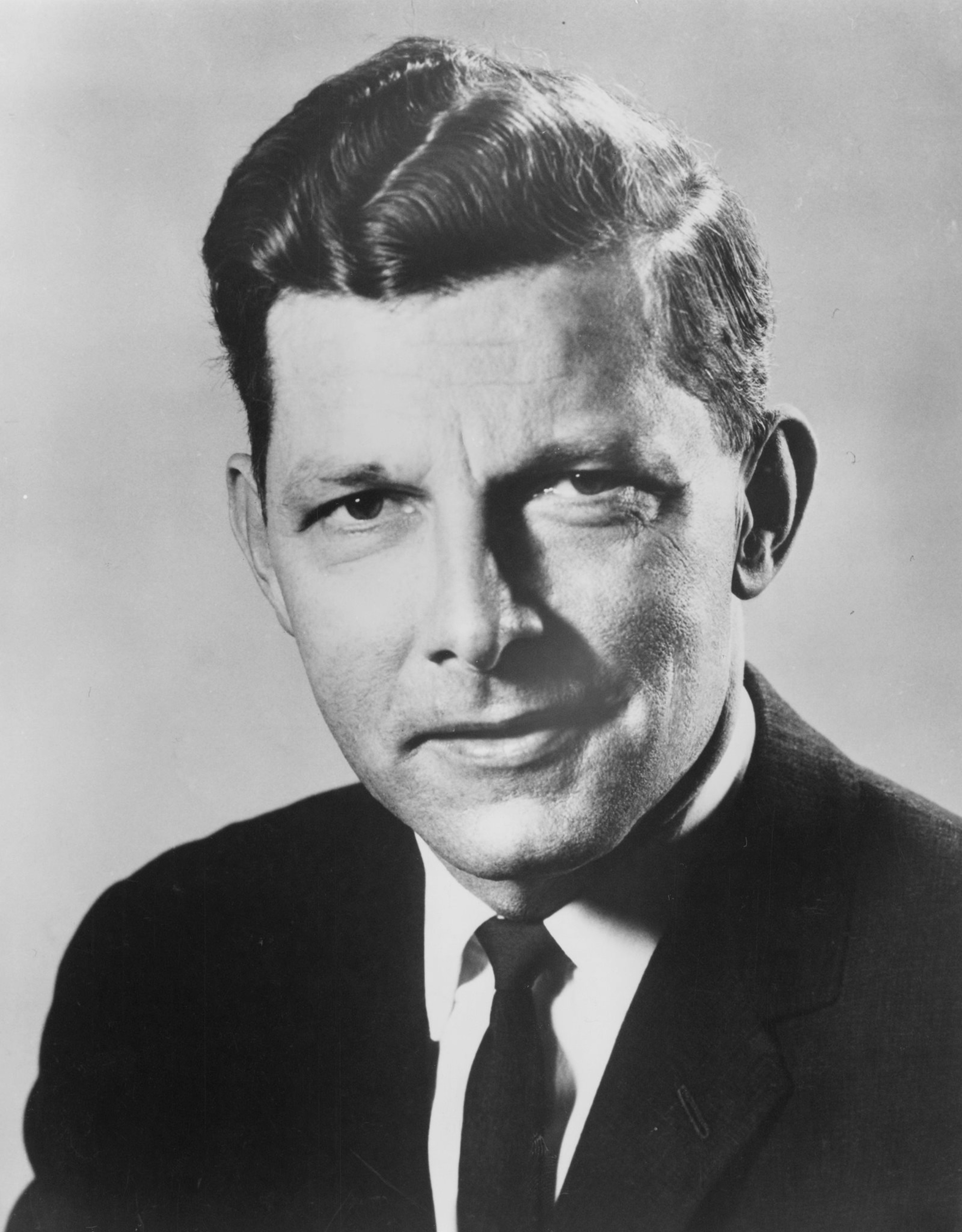
Nominee	Malcolm Wallop	Gale W. McGee
Party	Republican	Democratic
Popular vote	84,810	70,558
Percentage	54.59%	45.41%
- County results Wallop: 50–60% 60–70% 70–80% McGee: 50–60%
U.S. senator before election
Gale W. McGee
Democratic
Elected U.S. Senator
Malcolm Wallop
Republican

Gale W. McGee, the incumbent senator and former professor at the University of Wyoming, was originally elected in 1958 over Frank A. Barrett. He subsequently won two more elections to the senate over John S. Wold. McGee, who managed to become re-elected several times in a heavily Republican-leaning state, faced headwinds from Gerald Ford's popularity in the state. State Senator Malcolm Wallop was the Republican nominee.

In the general election, Wallop comfortably defeated McGee, who won just four counties in the state. To date, McGee is the last Democratic senator from Wyoming.

1976 United States Senate election in Wyoming results
Party	Candidate	Votes	%
Republican	Malcolm Wallop	84,810	54.59
Democratic	Gale McGee (incumbent)	70,558	45.41
Majority		14,252	9.12
Turnout		155,368	
Republican gain from Democratic			

== See also ==
- 1976 United States elections
  - 1976 United States gubernatorial elections
  - 1976 United States presidential election
  - 1976 United States House of Representatives elections
- 94th United States Congress
- 95th United States Congress

== Sources ==
- Congressional Elections, 1946-1996. Washington, D.C.: Congressional Quarterly Inc. 1998. ISBN 1-56802-248-4.
- Scammon, Richard M.; McGillivray, Alice V. (1977). America Votes 12: a handbook of contemporary American election statistics, 1976. Washington, D.C.: Elections Research Center.
