= 1976 United States Senate election in Connecticut =

- November 2, 1976
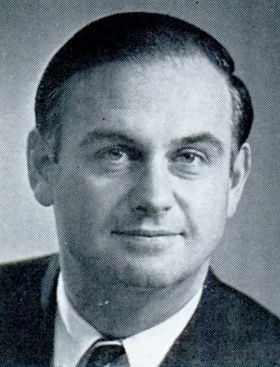

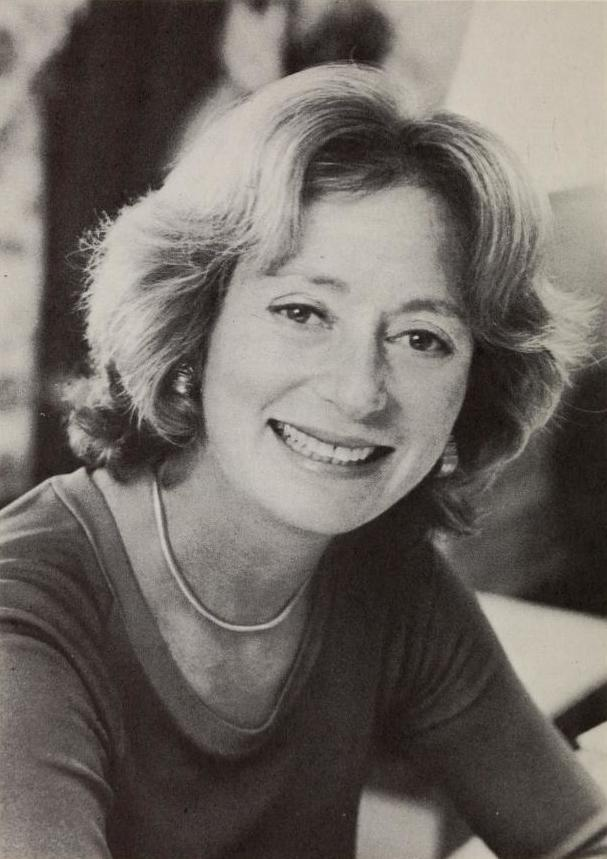
Nominee	Lowell Weicker	Gloria Schaffer
Party	Republican	Democratic
Popular vote	785,683	561,018
Percentage	57.70%	41.20%
- Weicker: 40–50% 50–60% 60–70% 70–80% Schaffer: 40–50% 50–60% 60–70%
U.S. senator before election
Lowell Weicker
Republican
Elected U.S. Senator
Lowell Weicker
Republican

The 1976 United States Senate election in Connecticut took place on November 2, 1976. Incumbent Republican U.S. Senator Lowell Weicker won re-election to a second term over Secretary of State Gloria Schaffer.

== General election ==
=== Candidates ===
- Robert Barnabei (George Wallace)
- Gloria Schaffer, Connecticut Secretary of State (Democratic)
- Lowell P. Weicker, Jr., incumbent U.S. Senator since 1971 (Republican)

=== Results ===
General election results
Party	Candidate	Votes	%
Republican	Lowell Weicker (incumbent)	785,683	57.70%
Democratic	Gloria Schaffer	561,018	41.20%
American Independent	Robert Barnabei	14,407	1.06%
Write-in		558	0.04%
Total votes		1,361,666	100.00%
Republican hold			

== See also ==
- 1976 United States Senate elections
