= Gloria Schaffer =

American politician (born 1930)

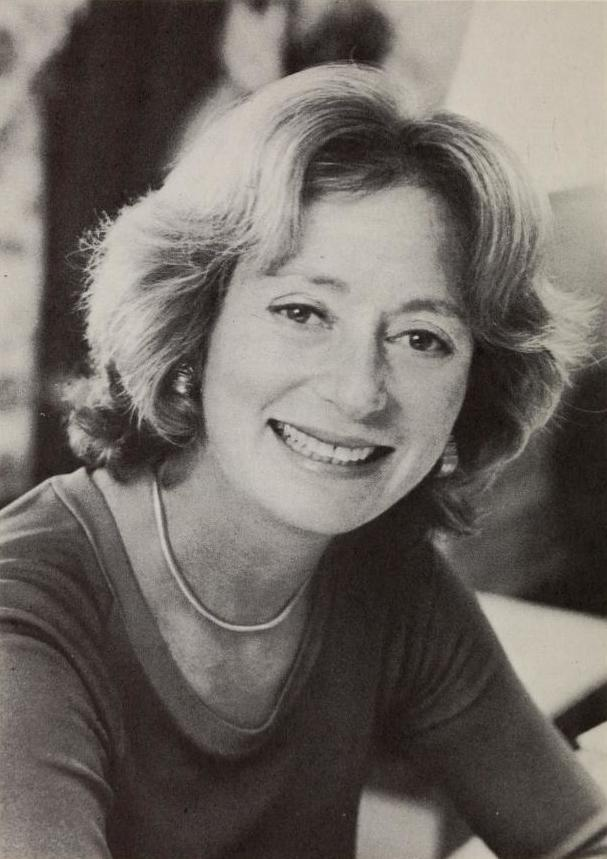
- Schaffer in 1977

65th Secretary of State of Connecticut
- In office January 3, 1971 – January 3, 1978
- Governor: Thomas Meskill; Ella Grasso
- Preceded by: Ella Grasso
- Succeeded by: Henry Cohn

Personal details
- Born: October 3, 1930 (age 95) New London, Connecticut, U.S.
- Party: Democratic
- Education: Sarah Lawrence College (BA)

Gloria Wilinski Schaffer (born October 3, 1930) is an American politician who served as Secretary of the State of Connecticut from 1971 to 1978. A Democrat from New London, she served in the Connecticut State Senate from 1959 to 1971. She attended The Williams School and Sarah Lawrence College and ran for the United States Senate in 1976.

== Life and career ==
Schaffer won election to the Connecticut State Senate from the 14th Senate District in 1958, serving six terms (1959–1971). She chaired the state senate's education committee. She won election as Secretary of the State of Connecticut in 1970 and served two terms from 1971 to 1978. In 1976 she ran for U.S. Senator in Connecticut but lost by a wide margin to Republican incumbent Lowell Weicker. She was the only woman to win a major party nomination for the US Senate in 1976.

In 1978, Schaffer was appointed a member of the US Civil Aeronautics Board by President Jimmy Carter. In 1985, she was appointed a member of the Connecticut Freedom of Information Commission by Governor William A. O'Neill, and then was appointed commissioner of the Connecticut Department of Consumer Affairs by Governor Lowell Weicker in 1991.

As of 2018, Schaffer was serving as a Fellow of Branford College of Yale University.

Political offices
Preceded by Ella Grasso	Secretary of State of Connecticut; 1971–1978	Succeeded by Henry Cohn
Party political offices
Preceded by Ella Grasso	Democratic nominee for Secretary of the State of Connecticut; 1970, 1974	Succeeded by Barbara B. Kennelly
Preceded by Joseph Duffey	Democratic nominee for U.S. Senator from Connecticut (Class 2); 1976	Succeeded by Toby Moffett
