= 1982 United States Senate elections =

- November 2, 1982
- Class 1

33 of the 100 seats in the United States Senate 51 seats needed for a majority
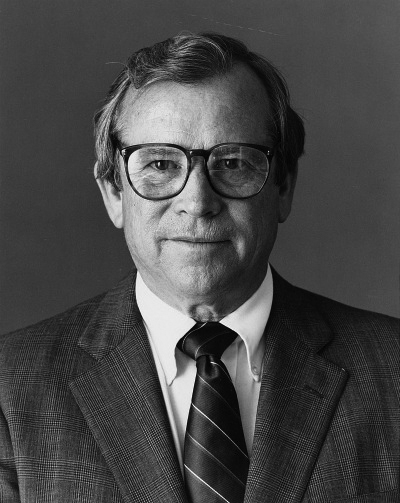

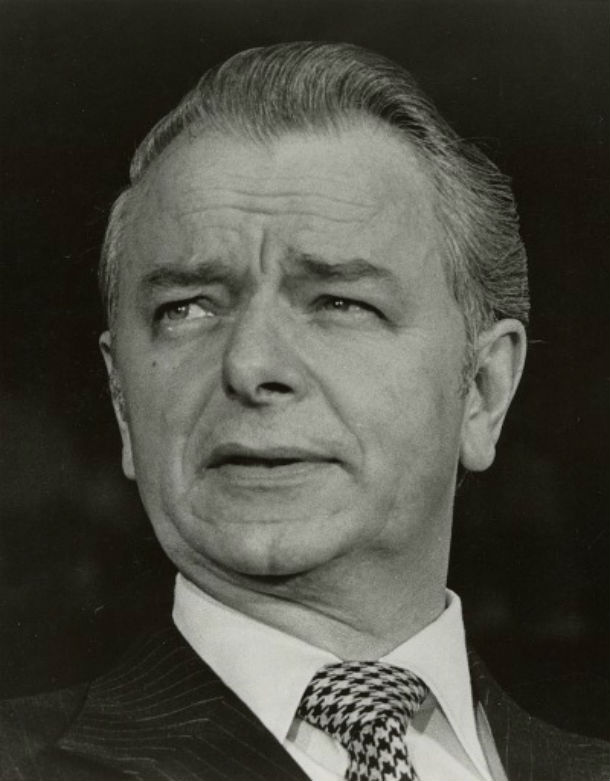
	Majority party	Minority party
Leader	Howard Baker	Robert Byrd
Party	Republican	Democratic
Leader since	March 5, 1980	January 3, 1977
Leader's seat	Tennessee	West Virginia
Seats before	54	45
Seats after	54	46
Seat change	Steady	▲1
Popular vote	22,412,928	27,899,651
Percentage	43.4%	54.1%
Seats up	13	19
Races won	13	20
	Third party
Party	Independent
Seats before	1
Seats after	0
Seat change	▼1
Seats up	1
Races won	0
- Results of the elections: Democratic gain Republican gain Democratic hold Republican hold No election
Majority Leader before election
Howard Baker
Republican
Elected Majority Leader
Howard Baker
Republican

The 1982 United States Senate elections were held on November 2, 1982. They were elections for the United States Senate following Republican gains in 1980. The 33 Senate seats of Class 1 were up for election in 1982. A total of four seats changed hands between parties, with Democrats winning seats in New Jersey and New Mexico, and Republicans taking seats in Nevada and the seat of the lone independent, Senator Harry Byrd Jr., in Virginia. Democrats made a net gain of one seat bringing them to 46 seats, while Republicans stayed at 54 seats for a majority. However, the Democratic gain in New Jersey replaced a Republican that had been appointed earlier in the year. Liberal Republican senators in Connecticut, Rhode Island and Vermont held on to their seats, keeping the Senate in Republican hands.

A special election was also held in Washington state in 1983 that gave Republicans a seat that was previously held by a Democrat, bringing their majority to 55–45. This was the last time until 2026 that Democrats won a U.S. Senate election in Mississippi, and remains the last time that Republicans have won one in Connecticut.

== Results summary ==
↓
46	54
Democratic	Republican

Parties						Total
Parties	Democratic	Republican	Independent	Libertarian	Other	Total
Last elections (1980)	46	53	1	0	0	100
Before these elections	45	54	1	0	0	100
Not up	26	41	0	0	0	67
Up Class 1 (1976→1982)	19	13	1	—	—	33
Incumbent retired	0	2	1	—	—	3
Held by same party	—	1	0	—	—	1
Replaced by other party	▼1 Republican replaced by ▲1 Democrat ▼1 Independent replaced by ▲1 Republican			—	—	2
Result	1	2	0	—	—	3
Incumbent ran	19 (Note: Includes the interim appointee who ran for election.)	11	0	—	—	30
Won re-election	18	10	—	—	—	28
Lost re-election	▼1 Republican replaced by ▲1 Democrat ▼1 Democrat replaced by ▲1 Republican		—	—	—	2
Lost renomination, but held by same party	0	0	—	—	—	0
Result	19	11	0	—	—	30
Total elected	20	13	0	0	0	33
Net gain/loss	▲1	Steady	▼1	Steady	Steady	1
Nationwide vote	27,899,651	22,412,928	146,512	291,576	839,328	51,589,995
Share	54.08%	43.44%	0.28%	0.57%	1.63%	100%
Result	46	54	0	0	0	100

Source: Office of the Clerk

== Gains, losses, and holds ==
=== Retirements ===
Map of retirements: Republican incumbent Democratic incumbent Independent incumbent Republican incumbent retired Independent incumbent retired

Two Republicans and one independent retired instead of seeking re-election.

State	Senator	Age at end of term	Assumed office	Replaced by
California	S. I. Hayakawa	76	1977	Pete Wilson
New Jersey	Nicholas F. Brady	52	1982 (Note: Appointed to the seat following the resignation of Harrison A. Williams.)	Frank Lautenberg
Virginia	Harry F. Byrd Jr.	68	1965 (Note: Appointed to the seat following the resignation of his father, Harry F. Byrd.)	Paul Trible

=== Defeats ===
One Republican and one Democrat sought re-election but lost in the general election.

State	Senator	Assumed office	Replaced by
Nevada	Howard Cannon	1959	Chic Hecht
New Mexico	Harrison Schmitt	1977	Jeff Bingaman

=== Post-election changes ===
One Democrat died on September 8, 1983, and was later replaced by Republican appointee.

State	Senator	Replaced by
Washington (Class 1)	Henry M. Jackson	Daniel J. Evans

== Change in composition ==
=== Before the elections ===
D_{1}	D_{2}	D_{3}	D_{4}	D_{5}	D_{6}	D_{7}	D_{8}	D_{9}	D_{10}
D_{20}	D_{19}	D_{18}	D_{17}	D_{16}	D_{15}	D_{14}	D_{13}	D_{12}	D_{11}
D_{21}	D_{22}	D_{23}	D_{24}	D_{25}	D_{26}	D_{27} Ariz. Ran	D_{28} Fla. Ran	D_{29} Hawaii; Ran	D_{30} Maine; Ran
D_{40} Ohio; Ran	D_{39} N.D. Ran	D_{38} N.Y. Ran	D_{37} Nev. Ran	D_{36} Neb. Ran	D_{35} Mont. Ran	D_{34} Miss. Ran	D_{33} Mich. Ran	D_{32} Mass. Ran	D_{31} Md. Ran
D_{41} Tenn. Ran	D_{42} Texas; Ran	D_{43} Wash. Ran	D_{44} W.Va. Ran	D_{45} Wis. Ran	I_{1} Va. Retired	R_{54} Wyo. Ran	R_{53} Vt. Ran	R_{52} Utah; Ran	R_{51} R.I. Ran
Majority →									R_{51} R.I. Ran
R_{41}	R_{42} Calif. Retired	R_{43} Conn. Ran	R_{44} Del. Ran	R_{45} Ind. Ran	R_{46} Minn. Ran	R_{47} Mo. Ran	R_{48} N.J. Retired	R_{49} N.M. Ran	R_{50} Pa. Ran
R_{40}	R_{39}	R_{38}	R_{37}	R_{36}	R_{35}	R_{34}	R_{33}	R_{32}	R_{31}
R_{21}	R_{22}	R_{23}	R_{24}	R_{25}	R_{26}	R_{27}	R_{28}	R_{29}	R_{30}
R_{20}	R_{19}	R_{18}	R_{17}	R_{16}	R_{15}	R_{14}	R_{13}	R_{12}	R_{11}
R_{1}	R_{2}	R_{3}	R_{4}	R_{5}	R_{6}	R_{7}	R_{8}	R_{9}	R_{10}

=== After the elections ===
D_{1}	D_{2}	D_{3}	D_{4}	D_{5}	D_{6}	D_{7}	D_{8}	D_{9}	D_{10}
D_{20}	D_{19}	D_{18}	D_{17}	D_{16}	D_{15}	D_{14}	D_{13}	D_{12}	D_{11}
D_{21}	D_{22}	D_{23}	D_{24}	D_{25}	D_{26}	D_{27} Ariz. Re-elected	D_{28} Fla. Re-elected	D_{29} Hawaii; Re-elected	D_{30} Maine; Elected (Note: Appointee elected)
D_{40} Tenn. Re-elected	D_{39} Ohio; Re-elected	D_{38} N.D. Re-elected	D_{37} N.Y. Re-elected	D_{36} Neb. Re-elected	D_{35} Mont. Re-elected	D_{34} Miss. Re-elected	D_{33} Mich. Re-elected	D_{32} Mass. Re-elected	D_{31} Md. Re-elected
D_{41} Texas; Re-elected	D_{42} Wash. Re-elected	D_{43} W.Va. Re-elected	D_{44} Wis. Re-elected	D_{45} N.J. Gain	D_{46} N.M. Gain	R_{54} Va. Gain	R_{53} Nev. Gain	R_{52} Wyo. Re-elected	R_{51} Vt. Re-elected
Majority →									R_{51} Vt. Re-elected
R_{41}	R_{42} Calif. Hold	R_{43} Conn. Re-elected	R_{44} Del. Re-elected	R_{45} Ind. Re-elected	R_{46} Minn. Re-elected	R_{47} Mo. Re-elected	R_{48} Pa. Re-elected	R_{49} R.I. Re-elected	R_{50} Utah; Re-elected
R_{40}	R_{39}	R_{38}	R_{37}	R_{36}	R_{35}	R_{34}	R_{33}	R_{32}	R_{31}
R_{21}	R_{22}	R_{23}	R_{24}	R_{25}	R_{26}	R_{27}	R_{28}	R_{29}	R_{30}
R_{20}	R_{19}	R_{18}	R_{17}	R_{16}	R_{15}	R_{14}	R_{13}	R_{12}	R_{11}
R_{1}	R_{2}	R_{3}	R_{4}	R_{5}	R_{6}	R_{7}	R_{8}	R_{9}	R_{10}

Key

D_{#}	Democratic
R_{#}	Republican
I_{#}	Independent

== Race summaries ==
=== Special elections ===
There were no special elections during 1982.

=== Elections leading to the next Congress ===
In these general elections, the winners were elected for the term beginning January 3, 1983; ordered by state.

All of the elections involved the Class 1 seats.

State	Incumbent			Result	Candidates
State	Senator	Party	Electoral history	Result	Candidates
Arizona	Dennis DeConcini	Democratic	1976	Incumbent re-elected.	▌ ✓ Dennis DeConcini (Democratic) 56.9%; ▌Pete Dunn (Republican) 40.3%; ▌Randall Clamons (Libertarian) 2.8%
California	S. I. Hayakawa	Republican	1976; 1977 (appointed)	Incumbent retired. Republican hold.	▌ ✓ Pete Wilson (Republican) 51.5%; ▌Jerry Brown (Democratic) 44.8%; Others: ▌Tena Dietrich (American Independent) 1.4%; ▌David Wald (Peace and Freedom) 1.2%; ▌Joseph Fuhrig (Libertarian) 1.1%
Connecticut	Lowell Weicker	Republican	1970; 1976	Incumbent re-elected.	▌ ✓ Lowell Weicker (Republican) 50.4%; ▌Toby Moffett (Democratic) 46.1%; ▌Lucien DiFazio (Conservative) 2.8%; ▌James A. Lewis (Libertarian) 0.7%
Delaware	William Roth	Republican	1970; 1971 (appointed); 1976	Incumbent re-elected.	▌ ✓ William Roth (Republican) 55.2%; ▌David N. Levinson (Democratic) 44.2%
Florida	Lawton Chiles	Democratic	1970; 1976	Incumbent re-elected.	▌ ✓ Lawton Chiles (Democratic) 61.7%; ▌Van Poole (Republican) 38.3%
Hawaii	Spark Matsunaga	Democratic	1976	Incumbent re-elected.	▌ ✓ Spark Matsunaga (Democratic) 80.1%; ▌Clarence J. Brown (Republican) 17.0%; ▌E. Bernier-Nachtwey (Independent) 2.9%
Indiana	Richard Lugar	Republican	1976	Incumbent re-elected.	▌ ✓ Richard Lugar (Republican) 53.8%; ▌Floyd Fithian (Democratic) 45.6%; ▌Raymond James (American) 0.6%
Maine	George J. Mitchell	Democratic	1980 (appointed)	Interim appointee elected.	▌ ✓ George J. Mitchell (Democratic) 60.9%; ▌David F. Emery (Republican) 39.1%
Maryland	Paul Sarbanes	Democratic	1976	Incumbent re-elected.	▌ ✓ Paul Sarbanes (Democratic) 63.5%; ▌Lawrence Hogan (Republican) 36.5%
Massachusetts	Ted Kennedy	Democratic	1962 (special); 1964; 1970; 1976	Incumbent re-elected.	▌ ✓ Ted Kennedy (Democratic) 60.8%; ▌Ray Shamie (Republican) 38.3%; ▌Howard S. Katz (Libertarian) 0.9%
Michigan	Donald Riegle	Democratic	1976; 1976 (appointed)	Incumbent re-elected.	▌ ✓ Donald Riegle (Democratic) 57.7%; ▌Philip Ruppe (Republican) 40.9%
Minnesota	David Durenberger	Republican	1978 (special)	Incumbent re-elected.	▌ ✓ David Durenberger (Republican) 52.6%; ▌Mark Dayton (DFL) 46.6%
Mississippi	John C. Stennis	Democratic	1947 (special); 1952; 1958; 1964; 1970; 1976	Incumbent re-elected.	▌ ✓ John C. Stennis (Democratic) 64.2%; ▌Haley Barbour (Republican) 35.8%
Missouri	John Danforth	Republican	1976; 1976 (appointed)	Incumbent re-elected.	▌ ✓ John Danforth (Republican) 50.8%; ▌Harriett Woods (Democratic) 49.1%
Montana	John Melcher	Democratic	1976	Incumbent re-elected.	▌ ✓ John Melcher (Democratic) 54.4%; ▌Larry R. Williams (Republican) 41.7%; ▌Larry Dodge (Libertarian) 3.9%
Nebraska	Edward Zorinsky	Democratic	1976; 1976 (appointed)	Incumbent re-elected.	▌ ✓ Edward Zorinsky (Democratic) 66.6%; ▌Jim Keck (Republican) 28.5%; ▌Virginia Walsh (Independent) 4.9%
Nevada	Howard Cannon	Democratic	1958; 1964; 1970; 1976	Incumbent lost re-election. Republican gain.	▌ ✓ Chic Hecht (Republican) 50.1%; ▌Howard Cannon (Democratic) 47.7%
New Jersey	Nicholas F. Brady	Republican	1982 (appointed)	Interim appointee retired. Democratic gain. Incumbent resigned December 20, 1982, to give successor preferential seniority. Winner appointed December 27, 1982.	▌ ✓ Frank Lautenberg (Democratic) 50.9%; ▌Millicent Fenwick (Republican) 47.8%
New Mexico	Harrison Schmitt	Republican	1976	Incumbent lost re-election. Democratic gain.	▌ ✓ Jeff Bingaman (Democratic) 53.8%; ▌Harrison Schmitt (Republican) 46.2%
New York	Daniel Patrick Moynihan	Democratic	1976	Incumbent re-elected.	▌ ✓ Daniel Patrick Moynihan (Democratic) 65.1%; ▌Florence M. Sullivan (Republican) 34.2%
North Dakota	Quentin Burdick	Democratic-NPL	1960 (special); 1964; 1970; 1976	Incumbent re-elected.	▌ ✓ Quentin Burdick (Democratic-NPL) 62.8%; ▌Gene Knorr (Republican) 34.0%; ▌Anna B. Bourgois (Independent) 3.1%
Ohio	Howard Metzenbaum	Democratic	1974 (appointed); 1974 (Lost); 1974 (Resigned); 1976; 1976 (appointed)	Incumbent re-elected.	▌ ✓ Howard Metzenbaum (Democratic) 56.7%; ▌Paul Pfeifer (Republican) 41.1%
Pennsylvania	John Heinz	Republican	1976	Incumbent re-elected.	▌ ✓ John Heinz (Republican) 59.3%; ▌Cyril Wecht (Democratic) 39.2%
Rhode Island	John Chafee	Republican	1976; 1976 (appointed)	Incumbent re-elected.	▌ ✓ John Chafee (Republican) 51.2%; ▌Julius C. Michaelson (Democratic) 48.8%
Tennessee	Jim Sasser	Democratic	1976	Incumbent re-elected.	▌ ✓ Jim Sasser (Democratic) 61.9%; ▌Robin Beard (Republican) 38.1%
Texas	Lloyd Bentsen	Democratic	1970; 1976	Incumbent re-elected.	▌ ✓ Lloyd Bentsen (Democratic) 58.6%; ▌James M. Collins (Republican) 40.5%
Utah	Orrin Hatch	Republican	1976	Incumbent re-elected.	▌ ✓ Orrin Hatch (Republican) 58.3%; ▌Ted Wilson (Democratic) 41.3%; Others: ▌George Mercier (Libertarian) 0.2%; ▌Lawrence R. Kauffman (American) 0.2%
Vermont	Robert Stafford	Republican	1971 (appointed); 1972 (special); 1976	Incumbent re-elected.	▌ ✓ Robert Stafford (Republican) 50.3%; ▌James A. Guest (Democratic) 47.2%
Virginia	Harry F. Byrd Jr.	Independent	1965 (appointed) (Note: Byrd was appointed to the US Senate in 1965 and elected to finish his father's term in 1966 as a Democrat; he was re-elected in 1970 and 1976 as an independent.); 1966 (special); 1970; 1976	Incumbent retired. Republican gain.	▌ ✓ Paul Trible (Republican) 51.2%; ▌Dick Davis (Democratic) 48.8%
Washington	Henry M. Jackson	Democratic	1952; 1958; 1964; 1970; 1976	Incumbent re-elected.	▌ ✓ Henry M. Jackson (Democratic) 68.9%; ▌Doug Jewett (Republican) 24.3%; ▌King Lysen (Independent) 5.3%; ▌Jesse Chiang (Libertarian) 1.5%
West Virginia	Robert Byrd	Democratic	1958; 1964; 1970; 1976	Incumbent re-elected.	▌ ✓ Robert Byrd (Democratic) 68.5%; ▌Cleve Benedict (Republican) 30.8%; ▌William Bailey Howland (Socialist Workers) 0.7%
Wisconsin	William Proxmire	Democratic	1957 (special); 1958; 1964; 1970; 1976	Incumbent re-elected.	▌ ✓ William Proxmire (Democratic) 63.6%; ▌Scott McCallum (Republican) 34.1%
Wyoming	Malcolm Wallop	Republican	1976	Incumbent re-elected.	▌ ✓ Malcolm Wallop (Republican) 56.7%; ▌Rodger McDaniel (Democratic) 43.3%

== Closest races ==
In eleven races the margin of victory was under 10%.

State	Party of winner	Margin
Missouri	Republican	1.7%
Nevada	Republican (flip)	2.4%
Rhode Island	Republican	2.4%
Virginia	Republican (flip)	2.4%
New Jersey	Democratic (flip)	3.1%
Vermont	Republican	3.1% (Note: Vermont was the "tipping-point state".)
Connecticut	Republican	4.3%
Minnesota	Republican	6.0%
California	Republican	6.7%
New Mexico	Democratic (flip)	7.6%
Indiana	Republican	8.2%

== Arizona ==
Arizona election
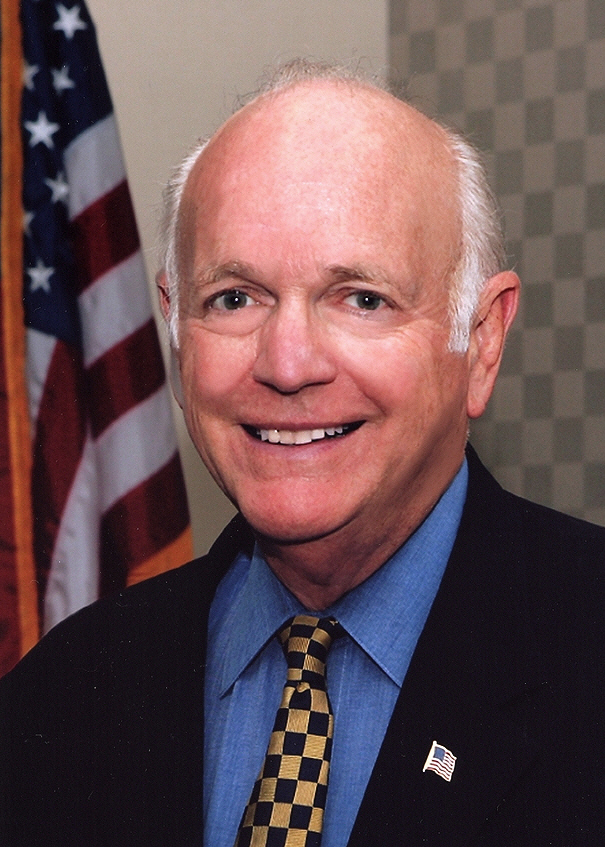

Nominee	Dennis DeConcini	Pete Dunn
Party	Democratic	Republican
Popular vote	411,970	291,749
Percentage	56.9%	40.3%
- County results DeConcini: 50–60% 60–70% 70–80% 80–90% Dunn: 40–50%
U.S. senator before election
Dennis DeConcini
Democratic
Elected U.S. Senator
Dennis DeConcini
Democratic

Incumbent Democrat Dennis DeConcini won re-election to a second term over Republican Pete Dunn, state representative.

General election results
Party	Candidate	Votes	%	±%
Democratic	Dennis DeConcini (incumbent)	411,970	56.9	+2.9%
Republican	Peter Dunn	291,749	40.3	−3.0%
Libertarian	Randall Clamons	20,100	2.8	+1.8%
Write-ins		66	0	
Majority		120,221	16.6	+5.9%
Turnout		723,885		
Democratic hold		Swing		

== California ==
California election
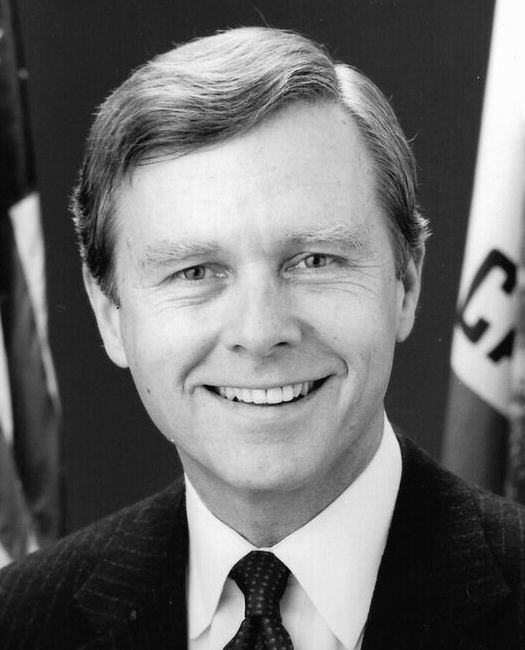

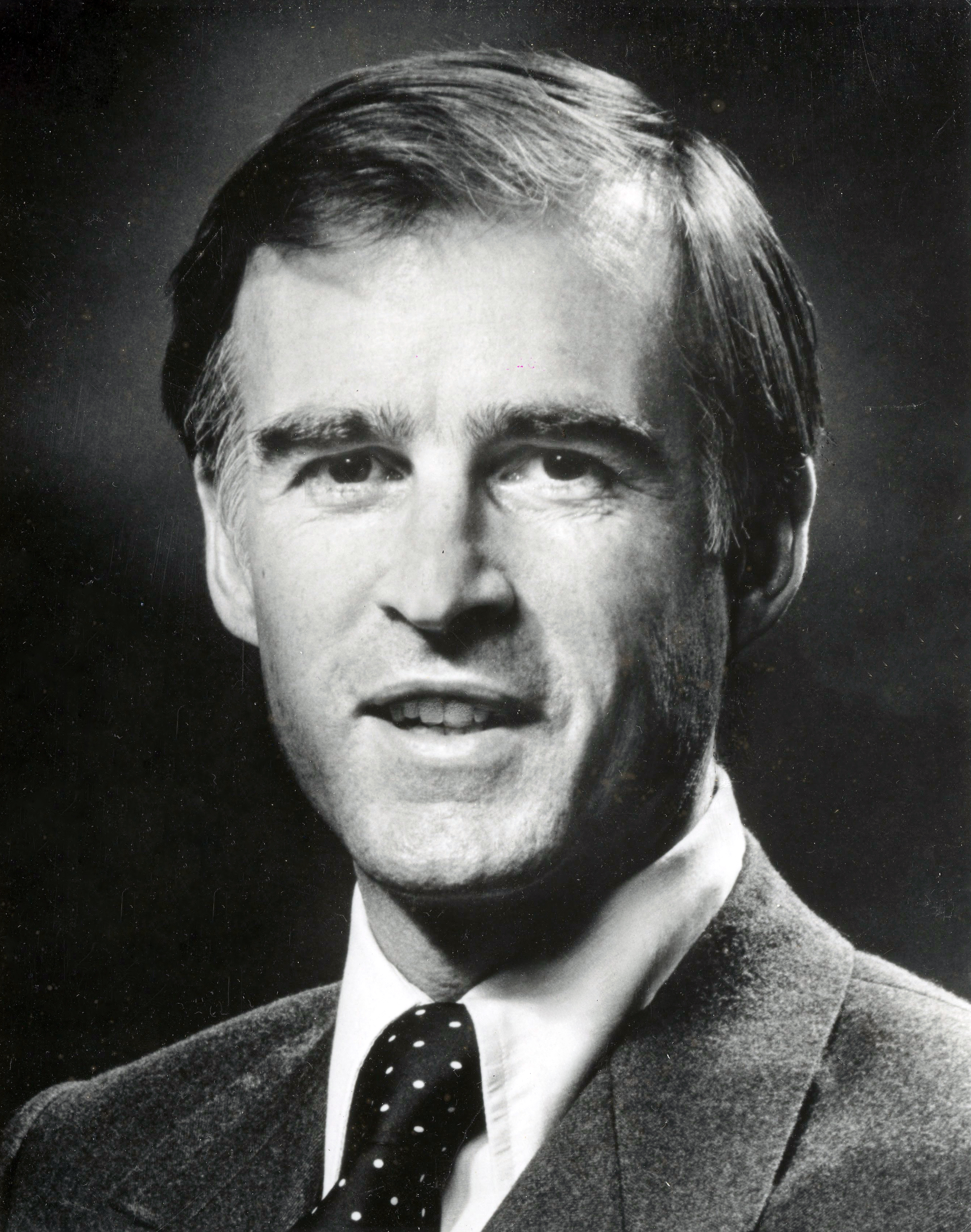
Nominee	Pete Wilson	Jerry Brown
Party	Republican	Democratic
Popular vote	4,022,565	3,494,968
Percentage	51.4%	44.8%
- County results Wilson: 40–50% 50–60% 60–70% 70–80% Brown: 40–50% 50–60% 60–70%
U.S. senator before election
S. I. Hayakawa
Republican
Elected U.S. Senator
Pete Wilson
Republican

Incumbent Republican S. I. Hayakawa decided to retire after one term. Republican Pete Wilson, mayor of San Diego and former assemblyman, won the open seat over Democratic Governor Jerry Brown.

Wilson was known as a fiscal conservative who supported Proposition 13, although Wilson had opposed the measure while mayor of San Diego. However, Brown ran on his gubernatorial record of building the largest state budget surpluses in California history. Both Wilson and Brown were moderate-to-liberal on social issues, including support for abortion rights. The election was expected to be close, with Brown holding a slim lead in most of the polls leading up to Election Day. Wilson hammered away at Brown's appointment of California Chief Justice Rose Bird, using this to portray himself as tougher on crime than Brown was. Brown's late entry into the 1980 Democratic presidential primary, after promising not to run, was also an issue. President Ronald Reagan made a number of visits to California late in the race to campaign for Wilson. Reagan quipped that the last thing he wanted to see was one of his home state's U.S. Senate seats falling into Democrats' hands, especially to be occupied by the man who succeeded him as governor. Despite exit polls indicating a narrow Brown victory, Wilson won by a wide margin.

General election results
Party	Candidate	Votes	%
Republican	Pete Wilson	4,022,565	51.5
Democratic	Jerry Brown	3,494,968	44.8
Libertarian	Joseph Fuhrig	107,720	1.4
Peace and Freedom	David Wald	96,388	1.2
American Independent	Theresa Dietrich	83,809	1.1
Independent	Thomas Kendall (Write In)	36	0
Independent	Ben Leonik (Write In)	34	0
Majority		527,597	6.7
Turnout		7,805,520	
Republican hold			

== Connecticut ==
Connecticut election
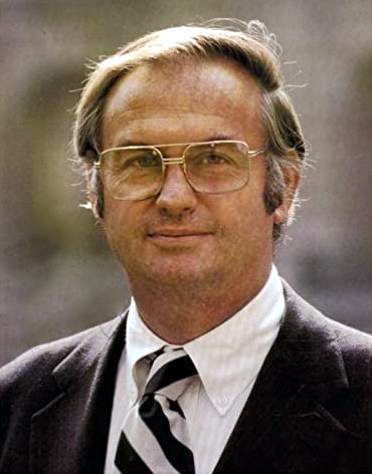

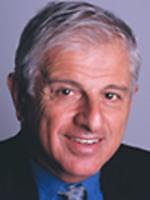
Nominee	Lowell Weicker	Toby Moffett
Party	Republican	Democratic
Popular vote	545,987	499,146
Percentage	50.4%	46.1%
- Weicker: 40–50% 50–60% 60–70% 70–80% Moffett: 40–50% 50–60% 60–70% Tie: 40–50%
U.S. senator before election
Lowell P. Weicker Jr.
Republican
Elected U.S. Senator
Lowell P. Weicker Jr.
Republican

Incumbent Republican Lowell P. Weicker Jr. won re-election to a third term over Democratic member of the House Toby Moffett.

General election results
Party	Candidate	Votes	%
Republican	Lowell Weicker (incumbent)	545,987	50.4
Democratic	Toby Moffett	499,146	46.1
Conservative	Lucien DiFazio	30,212	2.8
Libertarian	James A. Lewis	8,163	0.8
Majority		46,841	4.3
Turnout		1,083,508	
Republican hold			

== Delaware ==
Delaware election
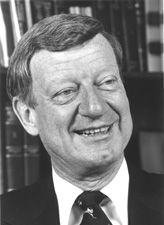

Nominee	Bill V. Roth	David N. Levinson
Party	Republican	Democratic
Popular vote	105,357	84,413
Percentage	55.2%	44.2%
- County results Roth: 50–60%
U.S. senator before election
Bill V. Roth
Republican
Elected U.S. Senator
Bill V. Roth
Republican

Incumbent Republican Bill V. Roth won reelection to a third term over the state's Democratic Insurance Commissioner David N. Levinson.

General election results
Party	Candidate	Votes	%	±%
Republican	Bill V. Roth (incumbent)	105,357	55.2	−0.6%
Democratic	David N. Levinson	84,413	44.2	+0.6%
Libertarian	Lawrence Sullivan	653	0.3	
American Independent	Charles Baker	537	0.3	0%
Majority		20,944	11.0	−1.2%
Turnout		190,960		
Republican hold		Swing		

== Florida ==
Florida election
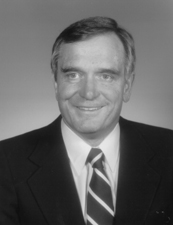

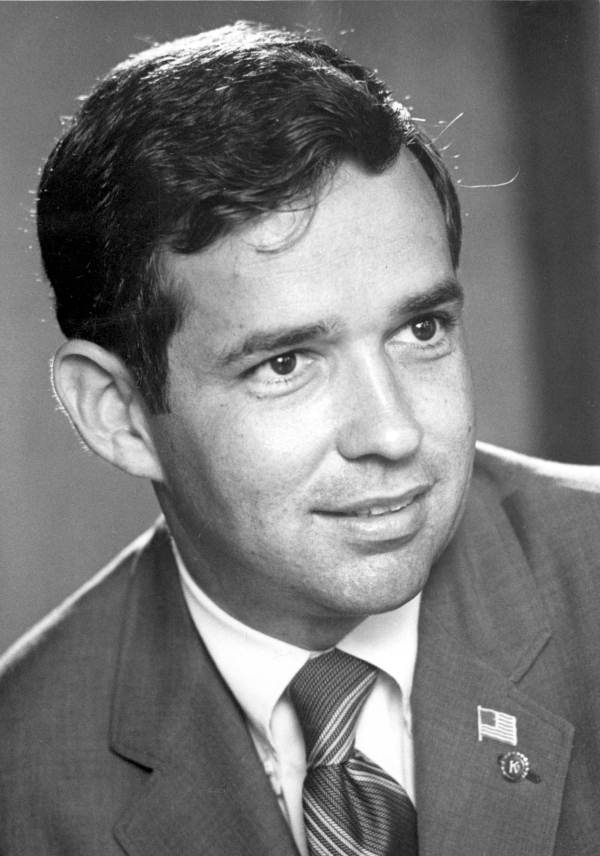
Nominee	Lawton Chiles	Van Poole
Party	Democratic	Republican
Popular vote	1,637,667	1,015,330
Percentage	61.7%	38.3%
- County results Chiles: 50–60% 60–70% 70–80% 80–90% Poole: 50–60% 60–70%
U.S. senator before election
Lawton Chiles
Democratic
Elected U.S. Senator
Lawton Chiles
Democratic

Incumbent Democrat Lawton Chiles won re-election to a third term over Republican state Senator Van Poole.

Democratic primary results
Party	Candidate	Votes	%
Democratic	Lawton Chiles (incumbent)	1,044,246	100

Republican primary results
Party	Candidate	Votes	%
Republican	Van Poole	154,163	41.6
Republican	David H. Bludworth	116,040	31.3
Republican	George Snyder	100,609	27.1
Total votes		370,812	100

Republican primary runoff results
Party	Candidate	Votes	%
Republican	Van Poole	131,655	58.1
Republican	David H. Bludworth	95,035	41.9
Total votes		226,690	100

General election results
Party	Candidate	Votes	%	±%
Democratic	Lawton Chiles (incumbent)	1,637,667	61.7	−1.3%
Republican	Van Poole	1,015,330	38.3	+1.2%
Write-ins		422	0	
Majority		622,337	23.5	−2.5%
Total votes		2,653,419	100	
Democratic hold		Swing		

== Hawaii ==
Hawaii election
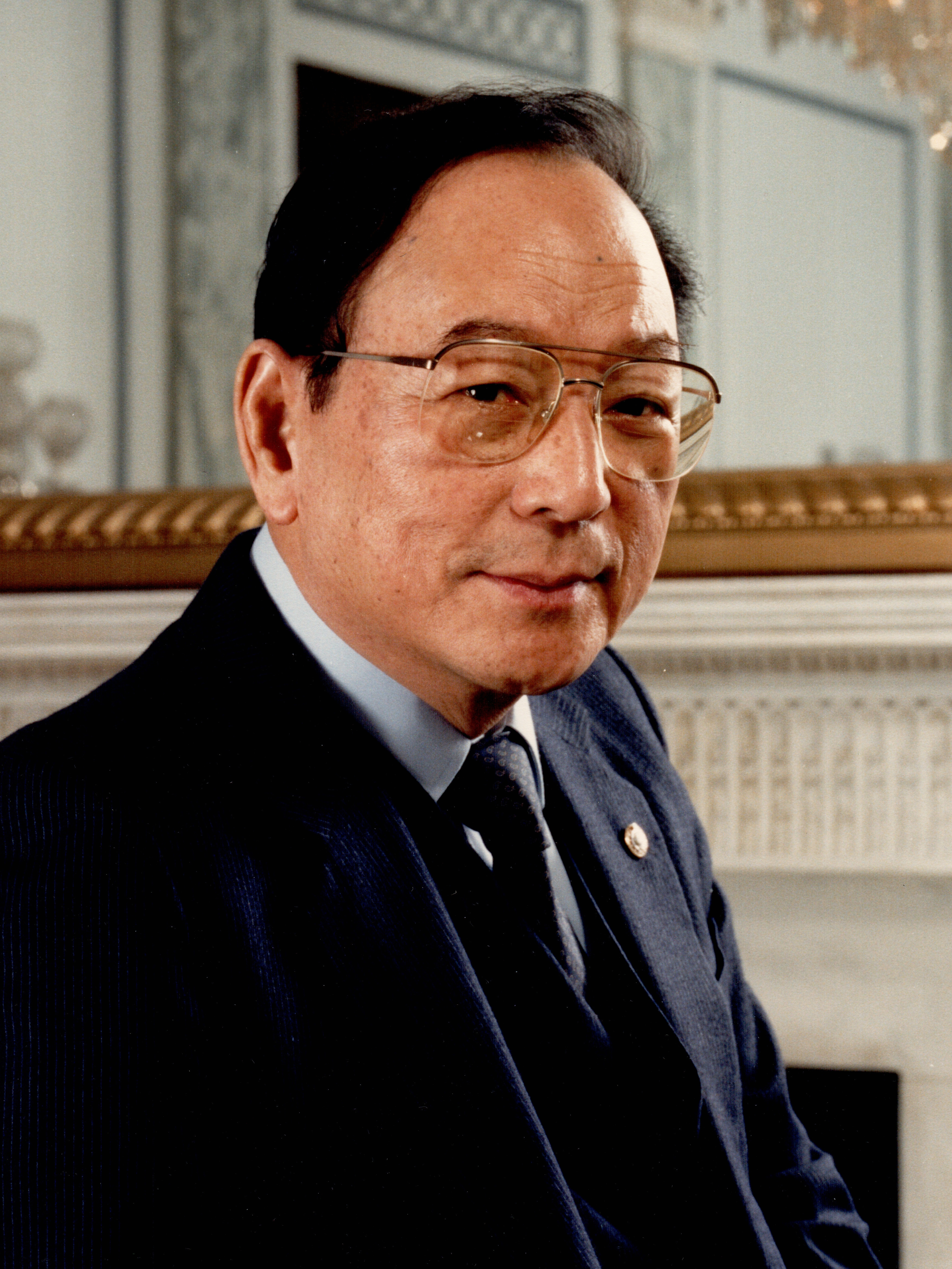

Nominee	Spark Matsunaga	Clarence Brown
Party	Democratic	Republican
Popular vote	245,386	52,071
Percentage	80.1%	17.0%
- County results Matsunaga: 70–80% 80–90%
U.S. senator before election
Spark Matsunaga
Democratic
Elected U.S. Senator
Spark Matsunaga
Democratic

Incumbent Democrat Spark Matsunaga won re-election to a second term over Republican Clarence Brown, a retired foreign service officer.

General election results
Party	Candidate	Votes	%
Democratic	Spark Matsunaga (incumbent)	245,386	80.1
Republican	Clarence Brown	52,071	17.0
Independent Democrat	E. Bernier-Nachtwey	8,953	2.9
Majority		193,315	63.1
Turnout		306,410	
Democratic hold			

== Indiana ==
Indiana election
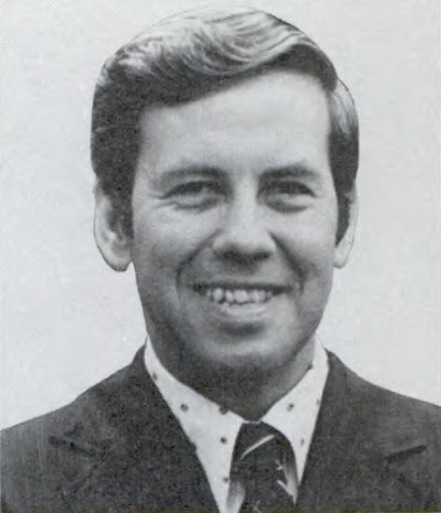

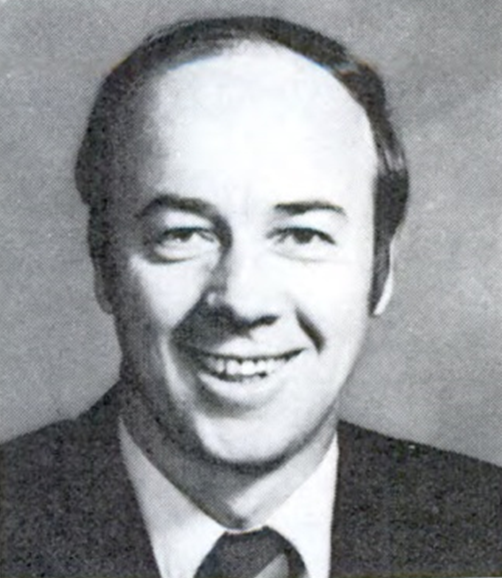
Nominee	Richard Lugar	Floyd Fithian
Party	Republican	Democratic
Popular vote	978,301	828,400
Percentage	53.8%	45.6%
- County results Lugar: 40-50% 50–60% 60–70% 70–80% Fithian: 40–50% 50–60% 60–70%
U.S. senator before election
Richard Lugar
Republican
Elected U.S. Senator
Richard Lugar
Republican

Incumbent Republican Richard Lugar faced Democratic United States Representative Floyd Fithian in the general election. Lugar won with a margin of 54% of the vote, compared to Fithian's 46%.

After the 1980 census, the Indiana General Assembly redistricted Indiana's congressional districts, pushing Democratic Representative Floyd Fithian's district into more conservative territory. After redistricting, Fithian, the three term incumbent of Indiana's 2nd congressional district, decided to run for secretary of state of Indiana, but withdrew from the primary to ultimately run for the United States Senate. He challenged fellow Democrat and one-term Indiana State Senator Michael Kendall of Jasper, Indiana, whom Fithian had earlier encouraged to run for the Senate. Kendall, who represented Indiana's 47th Senate district and formed the Notre Dame Students for Robert Kennedy organization during the 1968 presidential election, was seen as a young progressive alternative to Fithian, whom he called the "ideological twin of Richard Lugar." After the bitterly contested primary, Fithian prevailed over Kendall, winning with 59% of the vote.

Democratic primary results
Party	Candidate	Votes	%
Democratic	Floyd Fithian	262,644	59.5
Democratic	Michael Kendall	178,702	40.5
Total votes		441,346	100

Incumbent Senator Richard Lugar won the Republican nomination in an uncontested primary on May 4, 1982.

Republican primary results
Party	Candidate	Votes	%
Republican	Richard Lugar (incumbent)	498,248	100
Total votes		498,248	

In the general election, Lugar faced Fithian and American Party candidate Raymond James.

On November 2, 1982, Lugar defeated Fithian and James in the general election, winning 74 of Indiana's 93 counties.

Indiana election
Party	Candidate	Votes	%
Republican	Richard Lugar (incumbent)	978,301	53.8
Democratic	Floyd Fithian	828,400	45.6
American	Raymond James	10,586	0.6
Majority		149,901	8.3
Turnout		1,817,287	
Republican hold			

== Maine ==
Maine election
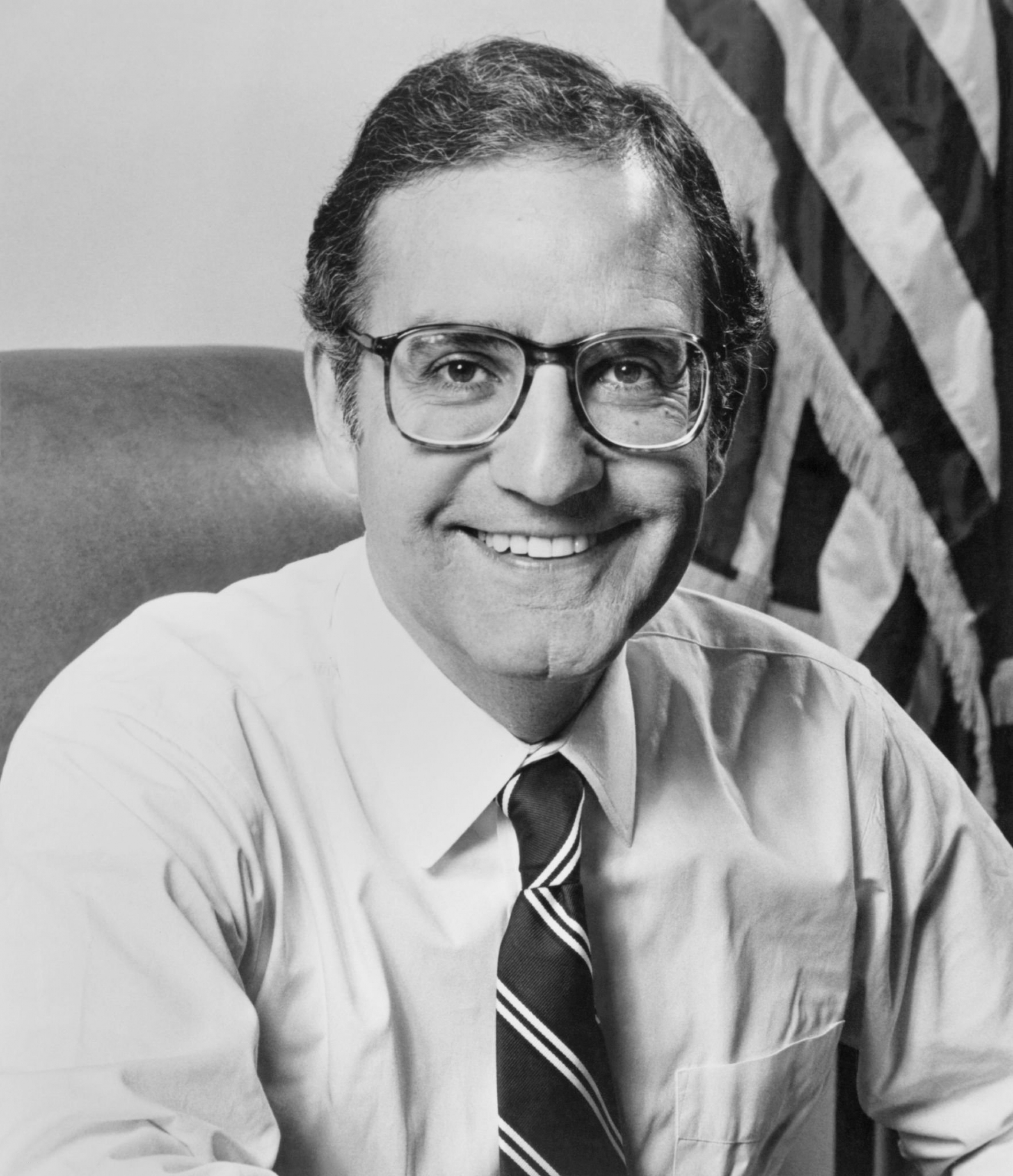

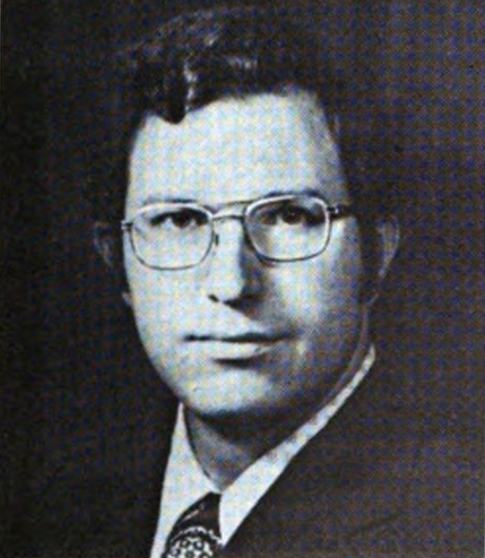
Nominee	George J. Mitchell	David F. Emery
Party	Democratic	Republican
Popular vote	279,819	179,882
Percentage	60.9%	39.1%
- County results Mitchell: 50–60% 60–70% Emery: 50-60%
U.S. senator before election
George J. Mitchell
Democratic
Elected U.S. Senator
George J. Mitchell
Democratic

Incumbent Democrat George J. Mitchell, originally appointed to the seat after Edmund Muskie resigned, won re-election to his full six-year term over Republican U.S. Representative David F. Emery, earning 61% of the vote to Emery's 39%. Mitchell would serve two more terms in the Senate, eventually serving as Senate majority leader.

Maine election
Party	Candidate	Votes	%
Democratic	George J. Mitchell (incumbent)	279,819	60.9
Republican	David F. Emery	179,882	39.1
None	Write-Ins	14	0
Majority		99,937	21.7
Turnout		459,715	
Democratic hold			

== Maryland ==
Maryland election
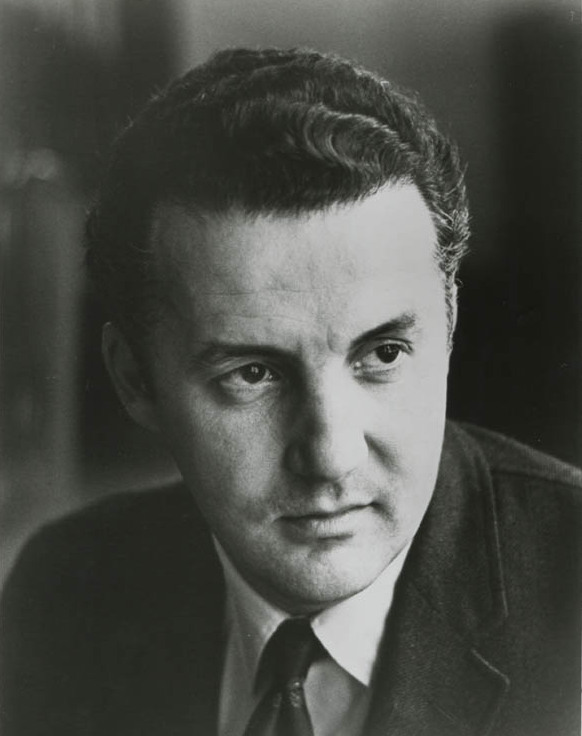

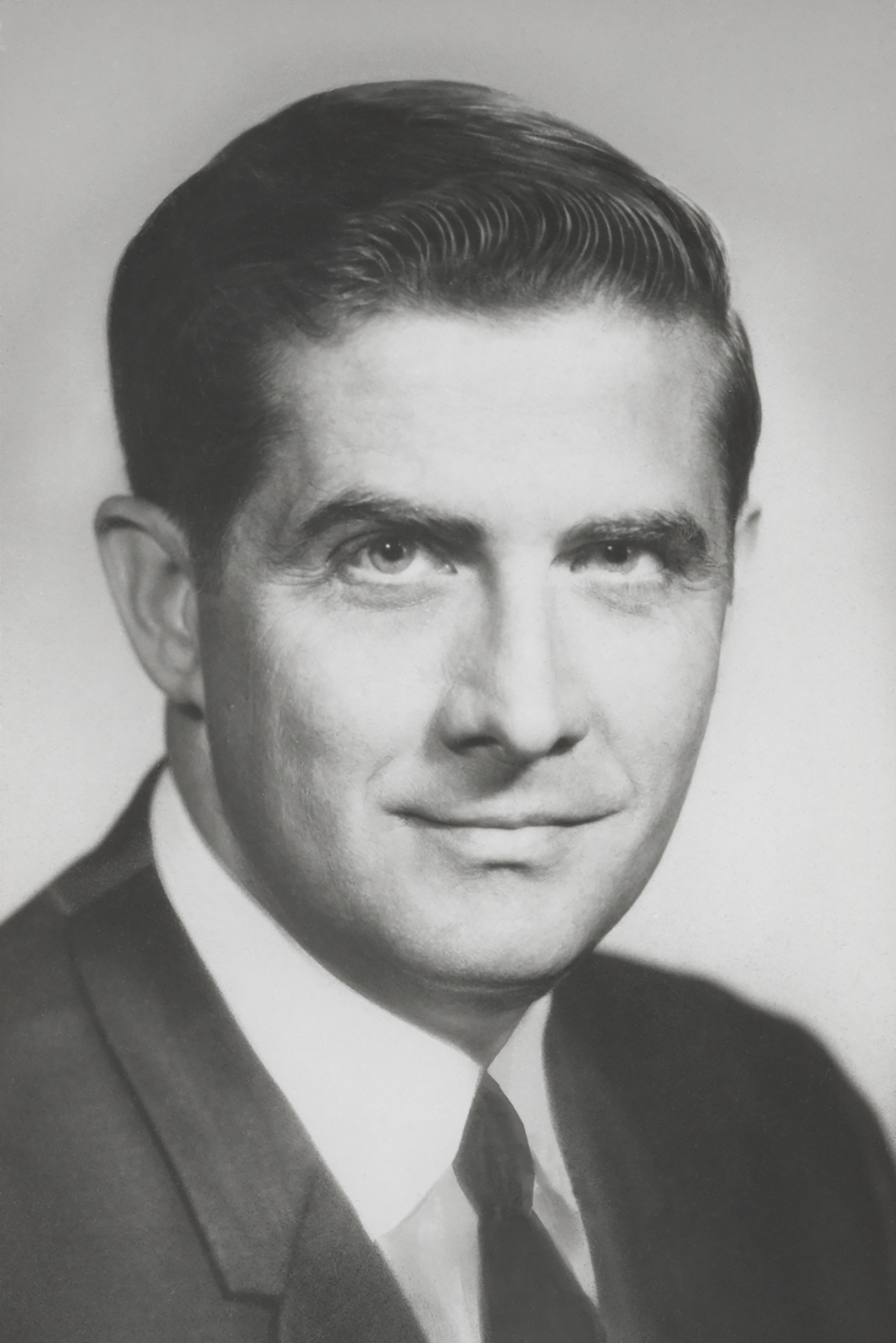
Nominee	Paul Sarbanes	Lawrence Hogan
Party	Democratic	Republican
Popular vote	707,356	407,334
Percentage	63.5%	36.5%
- County results Sarbanes: 50–60% 60–70% 80–90% Hogan: 50–60%
U.S. senator before election
Paul Sarbanes
Democratic
Elected U.S. Senator
Paul Sarbanes
Democratic

Incumbent Democrat Paul Sarbanes won re-election to a second term in office. He defeated the Republican former Representative from Maryland's 5th district and Prince George's County Executive Lawrence Hogan.

Maryland election
Party	Candidate	Votes	%
Democratic	Paul Sarbanes (incumbent)	707,356	63.5
Republican	Lawrence Hogan	407,334	36.5
Majority		300,022	26.9
Turnout		1,114,690	
Democratic hold			

== Massachusetts ==
Massachusetts election
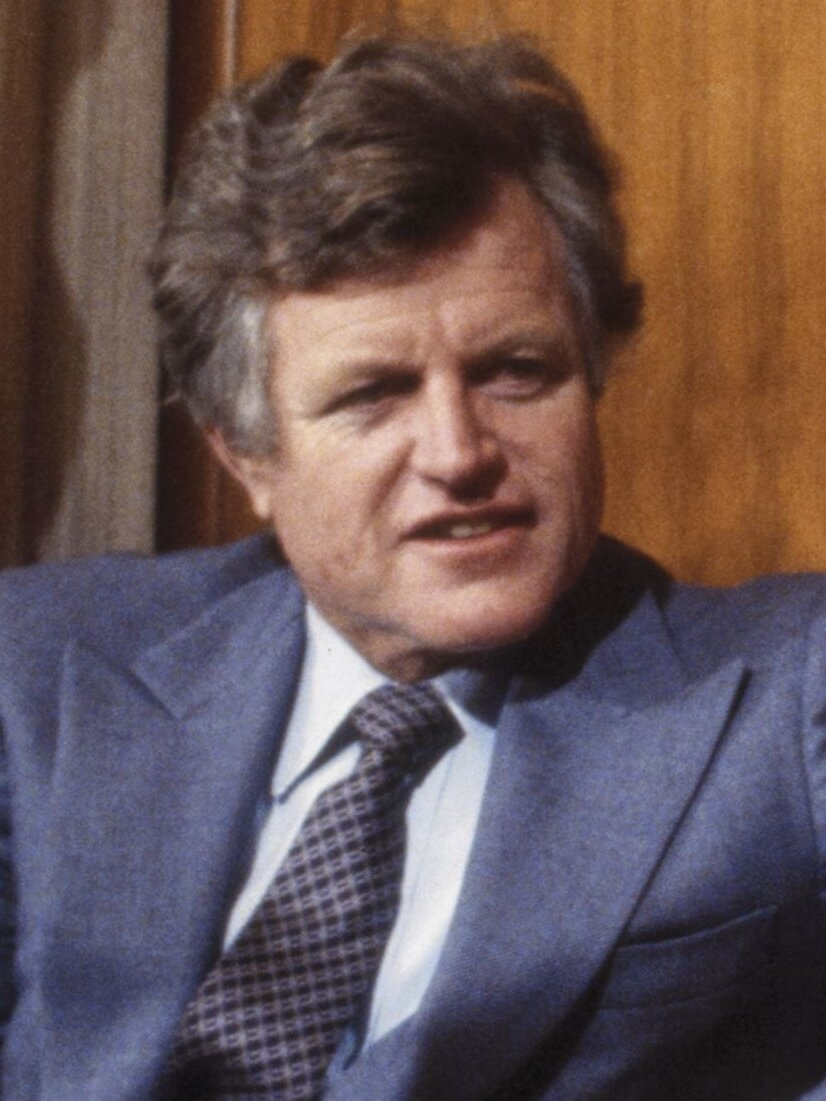

Nominee	Ted Kennedy	Ray Shamie
Party	Democratic	Republican
Popular vote	1,247,084	784,602
Percentage	60.8%	38.3%
- County results Kennedy: 40–50% 50–60% 60–70% 70–80% 80–90% 90–100% Shamie: 40–50% 50–60% 60–70% 70–80%
U.S. senator before election
Ted Kennedy
Democratic
Elected U.S. Senator
Ted Kennedy
Democratic

Incumbent Democrat Ted Kennedy won re-election to his fifth (his fourth full) term over Republican Ray Shamie, a millionaire businessman and metalwork entrepreneur.

General election
Party	Candidate	Votes	%	±%
Democratic	Ted Kennedy (incumbent)	1,247,084	60.8	−8.5
Republican	Ray Shamie	784,602	38.3	+9.3
Libertarian	Howard S. Katz	18,878	0.9	+0.9
	All others	205	0	0
Total votes		2,050,769	70.3%	
Majority		462,482	22.6%	
Democratic hold		Swing		

== Michigan ==
Michigan election
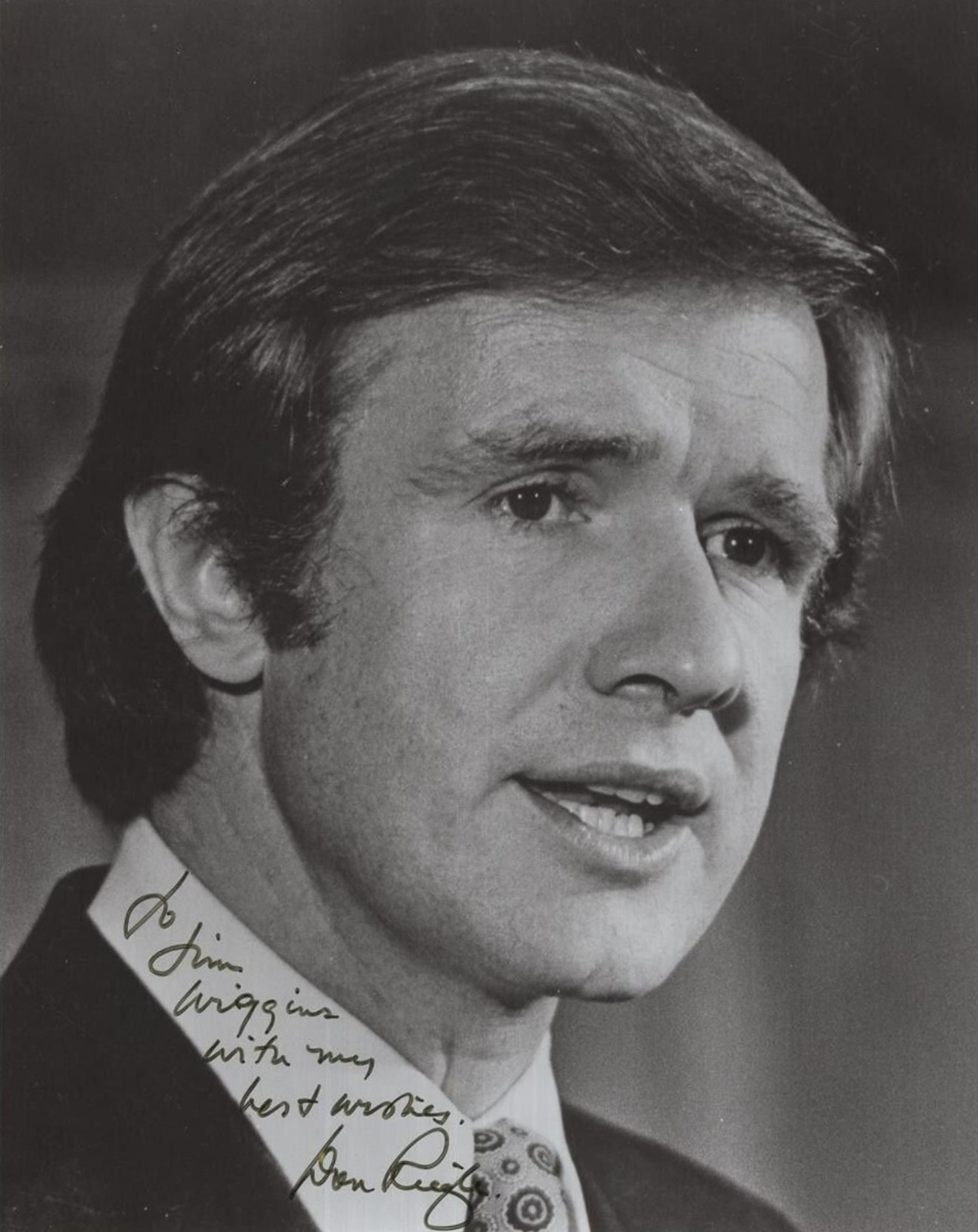

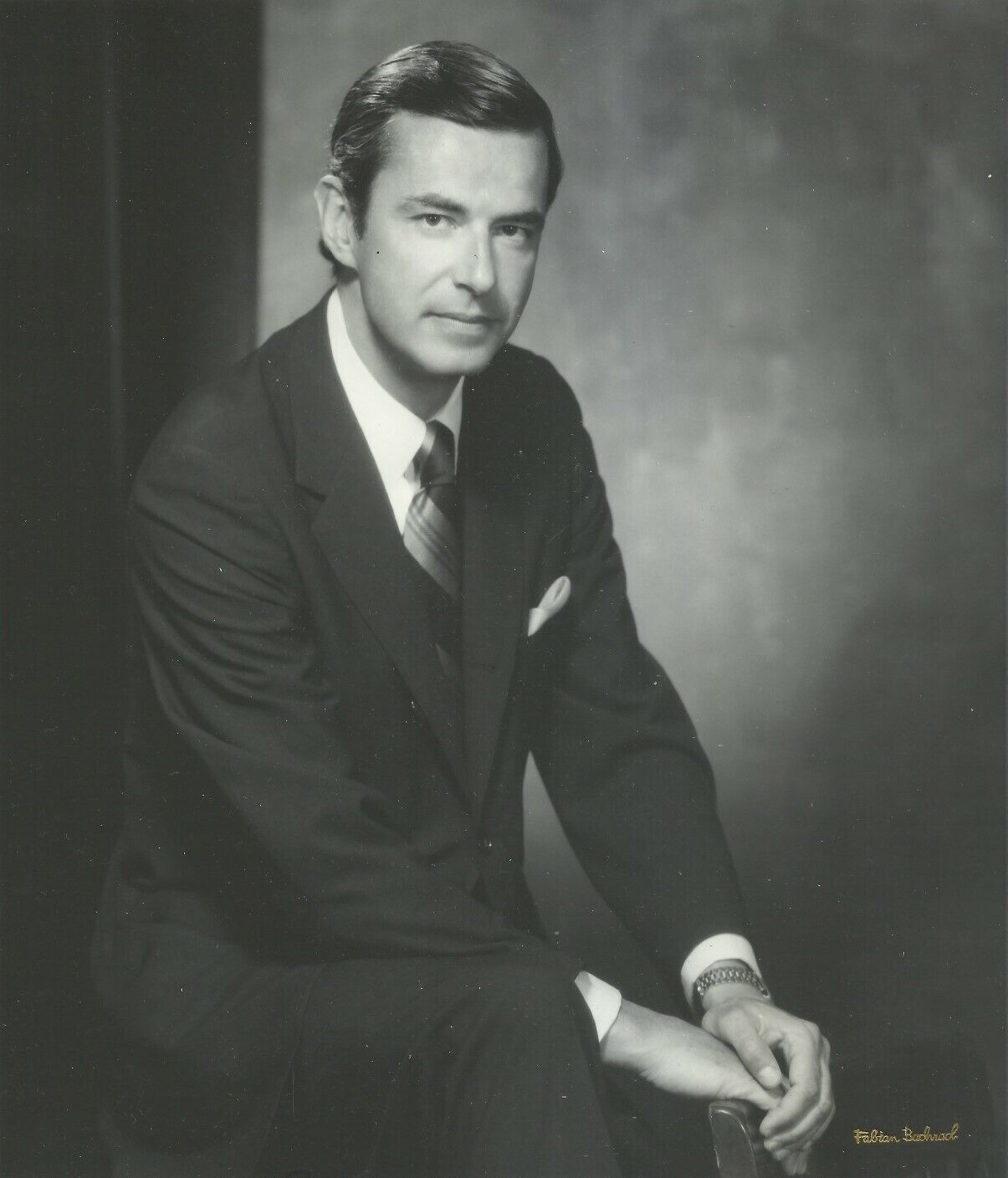
Nominee	Don Riegle	Philip Ruppe
Party	Democratic	Republican
Popular vote	1,728,793	1,223,288
Percentage	57.74%	40.85%
- County results Riegle: 50–60% 60–70% 70–80% Ruppe: 50–60% 60–70%
U.S. senator before election
Don Riegle
Democratic
Elected U.S. Senator
Don Riegle
Democratic

Incumbent Democrat Don Riegle won re-election to a second term, defeating Republican challenger Philip Ruppe, a former U.S. representative from Houghton.

Michigan election
Party	Candidate	Votes	%
Democratic	Donald Riegle (incumbent)	1,728,793	57.7
Republican	Philip Ruppe	1,223,288	40.9
Libertarian	Bette Erwin	19,131	0.6
American Independent	Daniel Eller	12,660	0.4
Workers League	Helen Halyard	6,085	0.2
Socialist Workers	Steve Beumer	4,335	0.1
None	Write-Ins	42	0
Majority		505,505	16.9
Turnout		2,994,334	
Democratic hold			

== Minnesota ==
Minnesota election
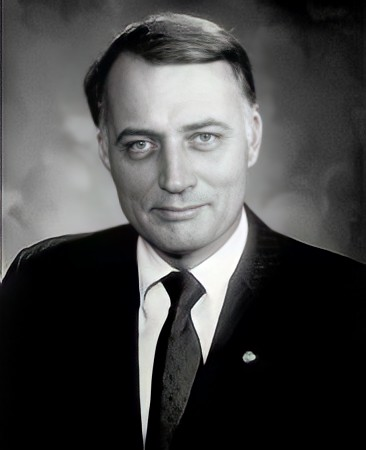

Nominee	David Durenberger	Mark Dayton
Party	Ind.-Republican	Democratic (DFL)
Popular vote	949,207	840,401
Percentage	52.6%	46.6%
- County results Durenberger: 40–50% 50–60% 60–70% Dayton: 50–60% 60–70%
U.S. senator before election
David Durenberger
Ind.-Republican
Elected U.S. Senator
David Durenberger
Ind.-Republican

Incumbent Republican David Durenberger won re-election to his second term over Democratic businessman Mark Dayton.

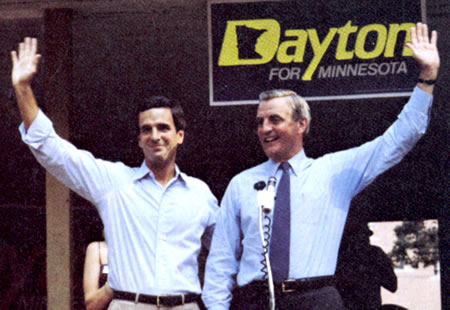
Dayton campaigning with former VP Walter Mondale.

General election results
Party	Candidate	Votes	%
Democratic	Mark Dayton	359,014	69.1
Democratic	Eugene McCarthy	125,229	24.1
Democratic	Charles E. Pearson	19,855	3.8
Democratic	William A. Branstner	15,754	3.0

Dayton, 35, self-financed his campaign. Married to a Rockefeller and heir to a department store, his net worth was an estimated $30 million. Durenberger, who in 1978 and won the special election to finish the term of the late Hubert Humphrey, was largely unknown. He was considered a moderate, but supported Reagan's tax cuts. Dayton ran against Reaganomics. He has also campaigned against tax breaks for the wealthy and even promised "to close tax loopholes for the rich and the corporations—and if you think that includes the Daytons, you're right." By the end of September, the senate election already became the most expensive election of all time, with over $8 million being spent. Dayton spent over $5 million, while Durenberger spent over $2 million.

General election results
Party	Candidate	Votes	%
Republican	David Durenberger (incumbent)	949,207	52.6
Democratic	Mark Dayton	840,401	46.6
Socialist Workers	Bill Onasch	5,897	0.3
Libertarian	Frederick Hewitt	5,870	0.3
New Union Party	Jeffrey M. Miller	3,300	0.2
Majority		108,806	6.0
Turnout		1,804,675	
Republican hold			

== Mississippi ==
Mississippi election
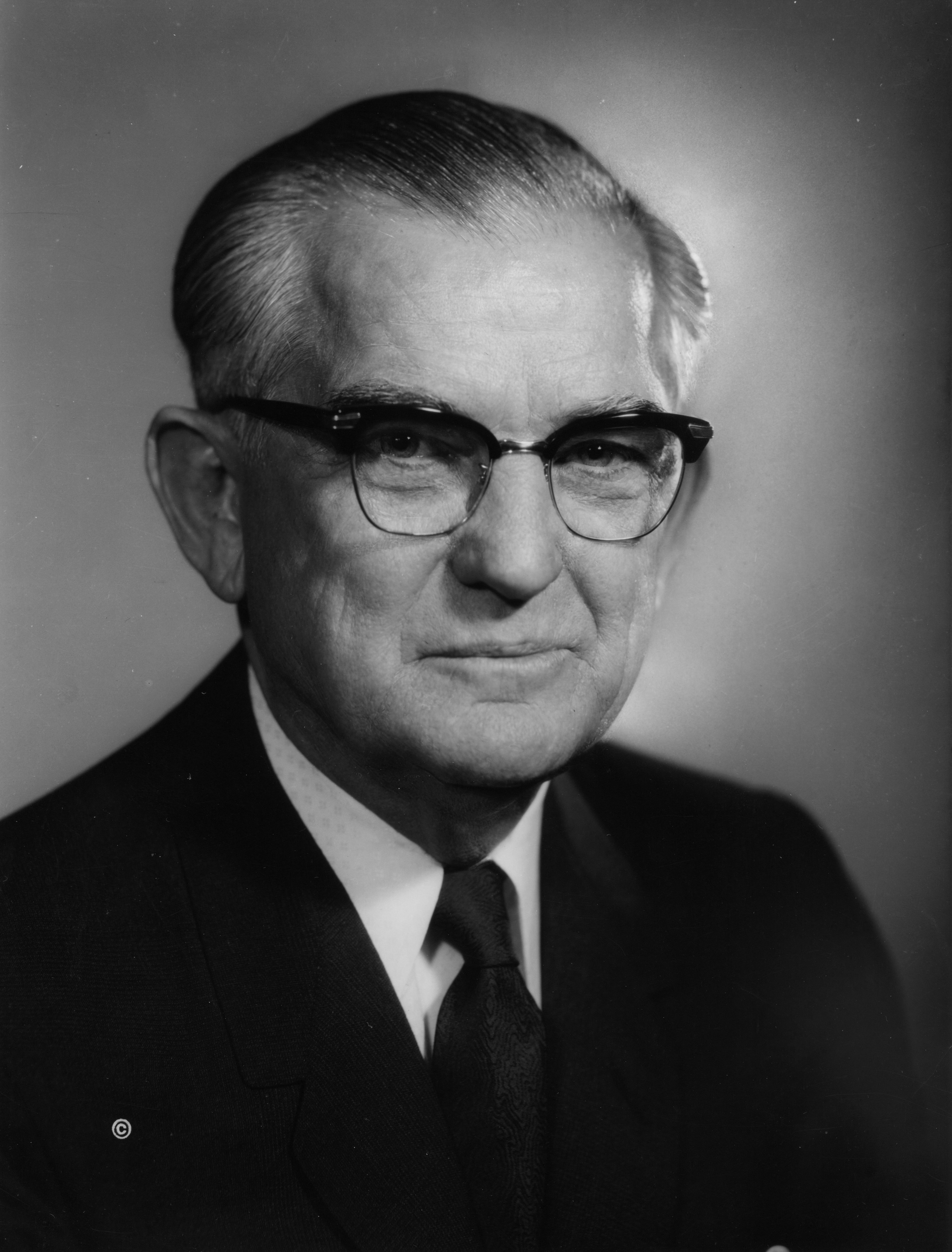

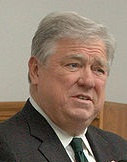
Nominee	John C. Stennis	Haley Barbour
Party	Democratic	Republican
Popular vote	414,099	230,927
Percentage	64.2%	35.8%
- County results Stennis: 50–60% 60–70% 70–80% 80–90% >90% Barbour: 50–60%
U.S. senator before election
John C. Stennis
Democratic
Elected U.S. Senator
John C. Stennis
Democratic

Incumbent Democrat John C. Stennis won re-election to his seventh term over Republican Haley Barbour, a political operative who campaigned for U.S. Presidents Richard Nixon and Gerald Ford.

General election results
Party	Candidate	Votes	%
Democratic	John Stennis (incumbent)	414,099	64.2
Republican	Haley Barbour	230,927	35.8
Majority		184,172	28.4
Turnout		645,026	
Democratic hold			

== Missouri ==
Missouri election
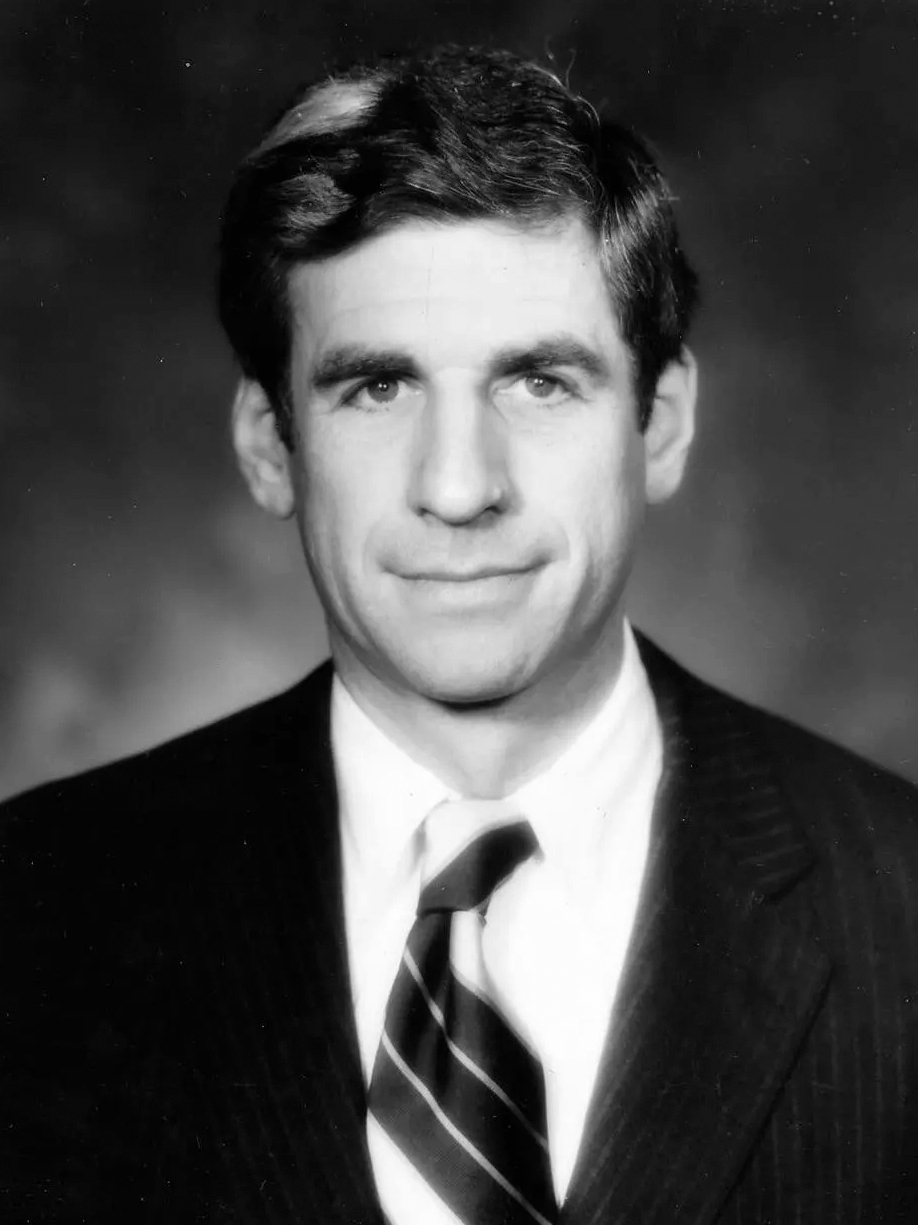

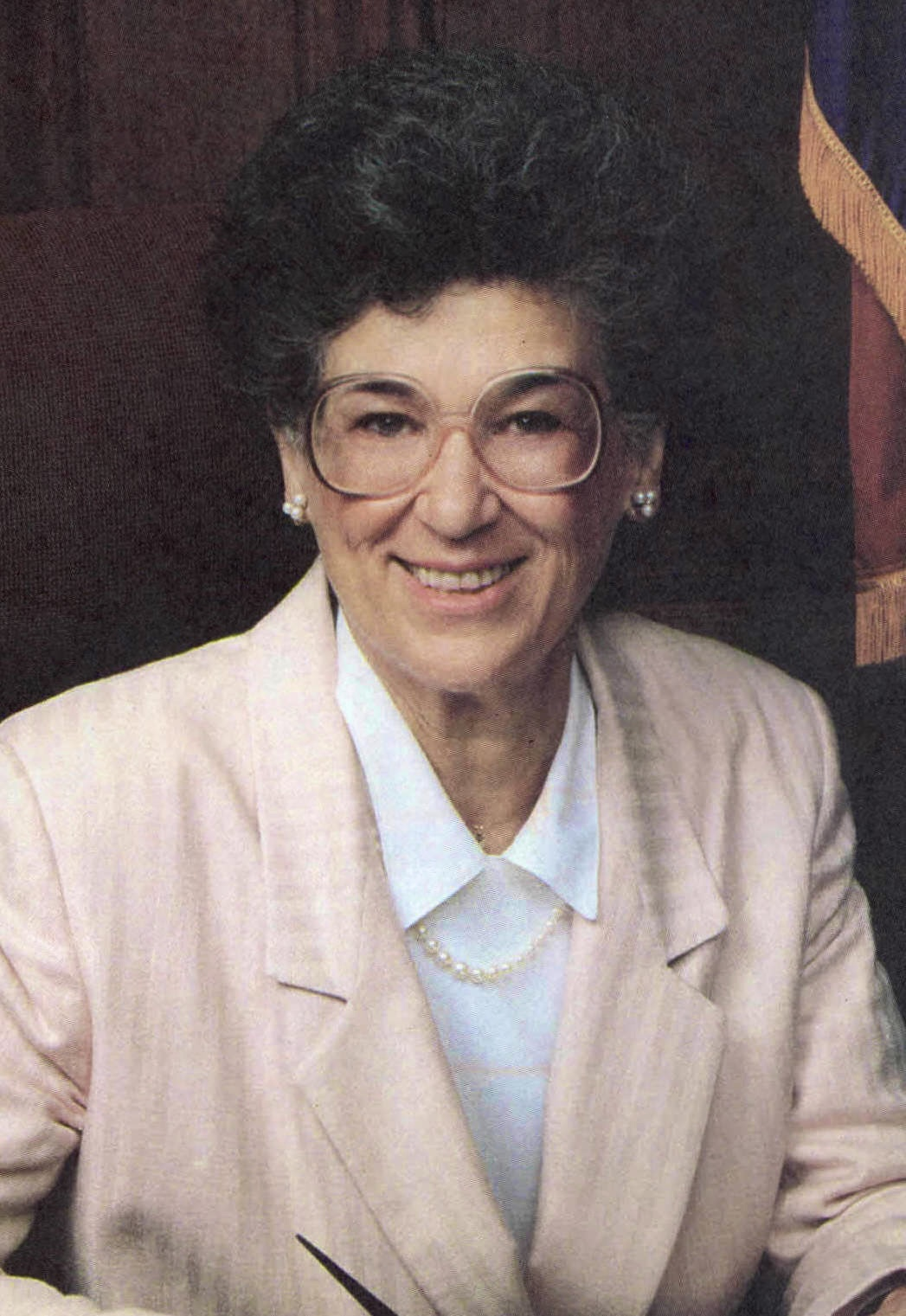
Nominee	John Danforth	Harriett Woods
Party	Republican	Democratic
Popular vote	784,876	758,629
Percentage	50.8%	49.2%
- County results Danforth: 50-60% 60-70% Woods: 50–60% 60-70%
U.S. senator before election
John Danforth
Republican
Elected U.S. Senator
John Danforth
Republican

Incumbent John Danforth, originally elected in the 1976 United States Senate election in Missouri, ran for a second term. In the general election, he narrowly defeated state Senator Harriett Woods by just over a percentage point. Danforth would go on to serve two more terms in the Senate.

Missouri election
Party	Candidate	Votes	%
Republican	John Danforth (incumbent)	784,876	50.9
Democratic	Harriett Woods	758,629	49.2
None	Write-Ins	16	0
Majority		26,247	1.7
Turnout		1,543,521	
Republican hold			

== Montana ==
Montana election
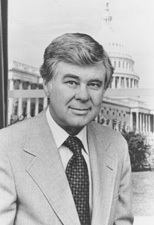

Nominee	John Melcher	Larry R. Williams
Party	Democratic	Republican
Popular vote	174,861	133,789
Percentage	54.5%	41.7%
- County results Melcher: 40–50% 50–60% 60–70% 70–80% Williams: 40–50% 50–60%
U.S. senator before election
John Melcher
Democratic
Elected U.S. Senator
John Melcher
Democratic

Incumbent John Melcher, who was first elected to the Senate in 1976, opted to run for re-election. He won the Democratic primary after he faced a tough intraparty challenger, and advanced to the general election, where he faced Larry R. Williams, an author and the Republican nominee, and Larry Dodge, the Libertarian nominee. Though his margin was reduced significantly from his initial election, Melcher still comfortably won re-election to his second and final term in the Senate.

During his first term in the Senate, Melcher's relative conservatism for a Democrat prompted a primary challenger in Michael Bond, a housing contractor who campaigned on his opposition to nuclear war. Bond attacked Melcher for voting to increase spending on nuclear arms, and pledged to reduce military spending to $60 billion and to use the savings to reduce interest rates. During the campaign, Bond came under fire from the state branches of the Veterans of Foreign Wars and the Disabled American Veterans for turning in his draft card in 1967 to protest the Vietnam War, who put out a statement saying, "There is no place in the U.S. Senate for any draft dodger, draft card burner or draft protester of any kind."

Democratic primary results
Party	Candidate	Votes	%
Democratic	Jack Melcher (incumbent)	83,539	68.3
Democratic	Mike Bond	33,565	27.4
Total votes		122,369	100

Republican primary results
Party	Candidate	Votes	%
Republican	Larry R. Williams	49,615	88.1
Republican	Willie Dee Morris	6,696	11.9
Total votes		56,311	100

Montana election
Party	Candidate	Votes	%	±%
Democratic	John Melcher (incumbent)	174,861	54.5	−9.7%
Republican	Larry R. Williams	133,789	41.7	+5.8%
Libertarian	Larry Dodge	12,412	3.9	
Majority		41,072	12.8	−15.5%
Turnout		321,062		
Democratic hold		Swing		

== Nebraska ==
Nebraska election
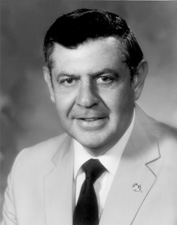

Nominee	Edward Zorinsky	Jim Keck
Party	Democratic	Republican
Popular vote	363,350	155,760
Percentage	66.6%	28.6%
- County results Zorinsky: 40–50% 50–60% 60–70% 70–80% Keck: 40–50% 50–60% Tie: 40–50%
U.S. senator before election
Edward Zorinsky
Democratic
Elected U.S. Senator
Edward Zorinsky
Democratic

Incumbent Democrat Edward Zorinsky won re-election.

Nebraska election
Party	Candidate	Votes	%
Democratic	Edward Zorinsky (incumbent)	363,350	66.6
Republican	Jim Keck	155,760	28.6
Independent	Virginia Walsh	26,443	4.9
None	Write-Ins	94	0
Majority		207,590	38.0
Turnout		545,647	
Democratic hold			

== Nevada ==
Nevada election
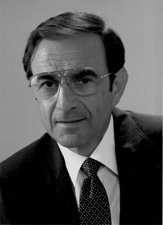

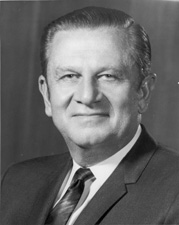
Nominee	Chic Hecht	Howard Cannon
Party	Republican	Democratic
Popular vote	120,377	114,720
Percentage	50.1%	47.7%
- County results Hecht: 40–50% 50–60% 60–70% Cannon: 50–60%
U.S. senator before election
Howard Cannon
Democratic
Elected U.S. Senator
Chic Hecht
Republican

Incumbent Democrat Howard Cannon ran for re-election to a fifth term, but lost to Republican state Senator Chic Hecht.

General election results
Party	Candidate	Votes	%
Republican	Chic Hecht	120,377	50.1
Democratic	Howard Cannon (incumbent)	114,720	47.7
None of These Candidates	–	5,297	2.2
Majority		15,657	2.4
Turnout		240,394	
Republican gain from Democratic			

== New Jersey ==
New Jersey election
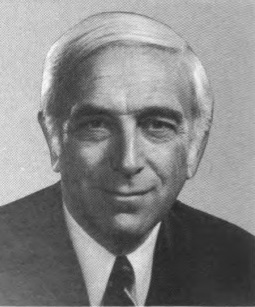

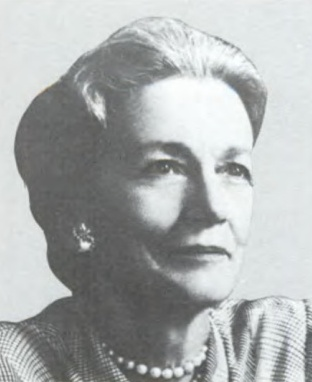
Nominee	Frank Lautenberg	Millicent Fenwick
Party	Democratic	Republican
Popular vote	1,117,549	1,047,626
Percentage	50.9%	47.8%
- Lautenberg: 50–60% 60–70% 70–80% Fenwick: 40–50% 50–60% 60–70%
U.S. senator before election
Nicholas F. Brady
Republican
Elected U.S. Senator
Frank Lautenberg
Democratic

Democrat Frank Lautenberg won for the seat held by retiring incumbent Republican Senator Nicholas Brady. Lautenberg won the seat with a margin of 3.2% over member of the House Millicent Fenwick.

Cresitello dropped out of the race on May 27, but remained on the June 8 primary ballot.

Democratic primary results
Party	Candidate	Votes	%
Democratic	Frank Lautenberg	104,666	26.0
Democratic	Andrew Maguire	92,878	23.1
Democratic	Joseph A. LeFante	81,440	20.2
Democratic	Barbara Boggs Sigmund	45,708	11.3
Democratic	Howard Rosen	28,427	7.1
Democratic	Angelo Bianchi	17,684	4.4
Democratic	Cyril Yannarelli	10,188	2.5
Democratic	Frank Forst	9,563	2.4
Democratic	Richard D. McAleer	8,110	2.0
Democratic	Donald Cresitello	4,295	1.1
Total votes		402,959	100

Republican primary results
Party	Candidate	Votes	%
Republican	Millicent Fenwick	193,683	54.3
Republican	Jeff Bell	163,145	45.7
Total votes		356,828	100

The seat had been occupied by Democrat Harrison A. Williams, who resigned on March 11, 1982, after being implicated in the Abscam scandal. After Williams' resignation, Republican Governor Thomas Kean appointed Republican Nicholas F. Brady to the seat. Brady served in the Senate through the primary and general elections, but did not run for the seat himself.

In the general election, Lautenberg faced popular Republican member of the House Millicent Fenwick. She ran on a very progressive platform, and polls in the summer of 1982 put her ahead by 18 points. Even Lautenberg quipped that she was "the most popular candidate in the country." Lautenberg spent more of his own money, eventually out-spending Fenwick two-to-one. He emphasised President Reagan's unpopularity, reminded the voters that she would be a vote for a Republican majority in the Senate, and called Fenwick, who was 72, "eccentric" and "erratic", but denied that he was referring to her age. He did, however, point out that she would be almost 80 at the end of her first term, and was therefore unlikely to gain much seniority in the Senate. The age issue would be used against Lautenberg in his own re-election bid in 2008.

Lautenberg won by 51% to 48%, in what was considered a major upset. Brady, who had just a few days left in his appointed term, resigned on December 27, 1982, allowing Lautenberg to take office several days before the traditional swearing-in of senators, which gave him an edge in seniority over the other freshman senators.

General election results
Party	Candidate	Votes	%
Democratic	Frank Lautenberg	1,117,549	50.9
Republican	Millicent Fenwick	1,047,626	47.8
Libertarian	Henry Koch	9,934	0.5
Socialist Labor	Julius Levin	5,580	0.3
Independent	Martin E. Wendelken	4,745	0.2
Socialist Workers	Claire Moriarty	3,726	0.2
Grassroots	Robert T. Bastien	2,955	0.1
Repeal TF 807	Rose Zeidwerg Monyek	1,830	0.1
Majority		69.923	3.2
Turnout		2,193,945	100
Democratic gain from Republican		Swing	

== New Mexico ==
New Mexico election
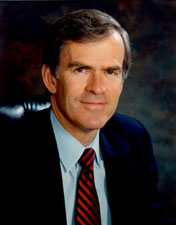

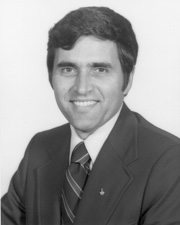
Nominee	Jeff Bingaman	Harrison Schmitt
Party	Democratic	Republican
Popular vote	217,682	187,128
Percentage	53.8%	46.2%
- County results Bingaman: 50–60% 60–70% 70–80% Schmitt: 50–60% 60–70%
U.S. senator before election
Harrison Schmitt
Republican
Elected U.S. Senator
Jeff Bingaman
Democratic

Incumbent Republican Harrison Schmitt ran for re-election to a second term, but lost to Democrat Jeff Bingaman, attorney general of New Mexico.

New Mexico election
Party	Candidate	Votes	%	±%
Democratic	Jeff Bingaman	217,682	53.8	+11.1%
Republican	Harrison Schmitt (incumbent)	187,128	46.2	−10.6%
Majority		30,554	7.6	−6.6%
Turnout		404,810		
Democratic gain from Republican		Swing		

== New York ==
New York election
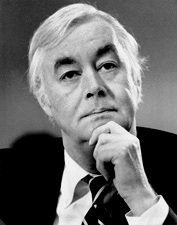
Nominee	Pat Moynihan	Florence Sullivan
Party	Democratic	Republican
Popular vote	3,232,146	1,696,766
Percentage	65.1%	34.2%
- County results Moynihan: 40–50% 50–60% 60–70% 70–80% 80–90% Sullivan: 40–50% 50–60%
U.S. senator before election
Pat Moynihan
Democratic
Elected U.S. Senator
Pat Moynihan
Democratic

Incumbent Democrat Daniel Patrick Moynihan won re-election to a second term over Republican Assemblywoman Florence Sullivan.

General election results
Party	Candidate	Votes	%
Democratic	Daniel Patrick Moynihan (incumbent)	3,232,146	65.1
Republican	Florence Sullivan	1,696,766	34.2
Libertarian	James J. McKeown	23,379	0.5
Socialist Workers	Steven Wattenmaker	15,206	0.5
None	Write-Ins	232	0
Majority		1,535,380	30.9
Turnout		4,967,729	
Democratic hold			

== North Dakota ==
North Dakota election
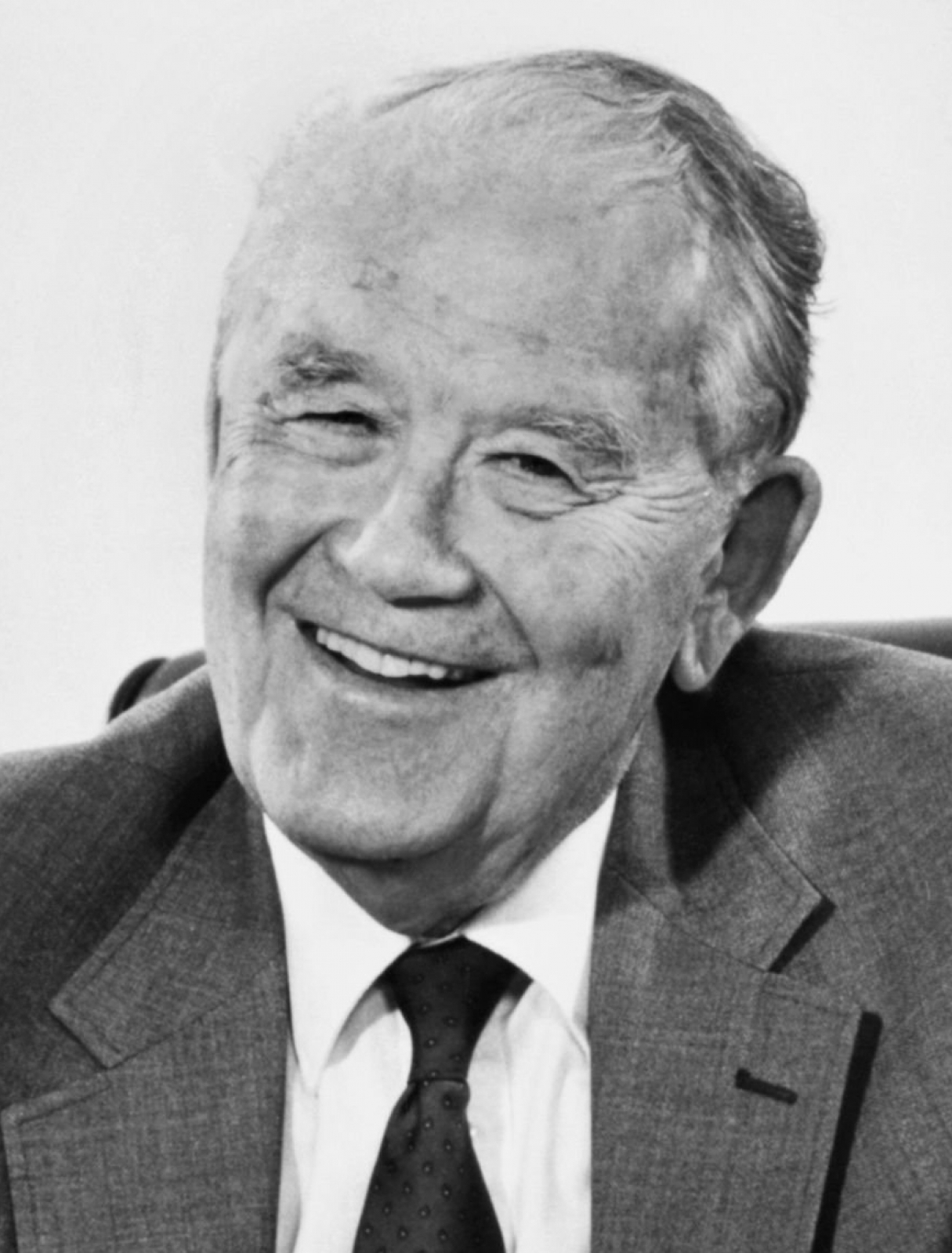

Nominee	Quentin Burdick	Gene Knorr
Party	Democratic–NPL	Republican
Popular vote	164,873	89,304
Percentage	62.82%	34.03%
- County results Burdick: 40–50% 50–60% 60–70% 70–80% Knorr: 40–50% 50–60%
U.S. Senator before election
Quentin Burdick
Democratic
Elected U.S. Senator
Quentin Burdick
Democratic

The incumbent, North Dakota Democratic NPL Party (Dem-NPL) Quentin Burdick, sought and received re-election to his fifth term, defeating Republican candidate Gene Knorr.

Only Burdick filed as a Dem-NPLer, and the endorsed Republican candidate was cattle rancher Knorr. Burdick and Knorr won the primary elections for their respective parties. Burdick's campaign was known for employing more television advertisement spending when compared with his campaigns in the past, as well as making several negative portrayals. Knorr had the support of Vice President George H. W. Bush, who campaigned in state to support his candidacy. The election was also noted as the first in which Burdick's age was an issue. Burdick, who was 74 during the year of the election, faced a much younger Knorr, who was 41. At one point, Burdick challenged Knorr to a fistfight to prove his vitality, but the challenge, assumed to be a joke, never occurred. After being defeated, Knorr moved to Washington, D.C., where he took the position of staff vice president with Philip Morris International.

One independent candidate, Anna B. Bourgois, also filed before the deadline, running under her self-created party titled "God, Family, and Country". She would later run for North Dakota's other United States Senate seat as an independent in 1986, challenging Mark Andrews. She received over 8,000 votes in the election, which is high for an independent. Some attribute her large number of votes to the name of her party, which was based on things that North Dakotans valued. Despite the result, Bourgois' campaign had little impact on the outcome.

North Dakota election
Party	Candidate	Votes	%
Democratic	Quentin Burdick (incumbent)	164,873	62.8
Republican	Gene Knorr	89,304	34.0
Independent	Anna B. Bourgois	8,288	3.1
Majority		75,569	28.8
Turnout		262,465	
Democratic hold			

Prior to the 1982 Senate campaign, Knorr had worked in Washington, DC since 1970, when he worked for the Department of the Treasury. He began working in Washington, DC, residing in McLean, Virginia after receiving a Juris Doctor from Northwestern University, where he was celebrated in debate. After the Treasury, he worked as a lobbyist with Charls E. Walker Associates.

== Ohio ==
Ohio election
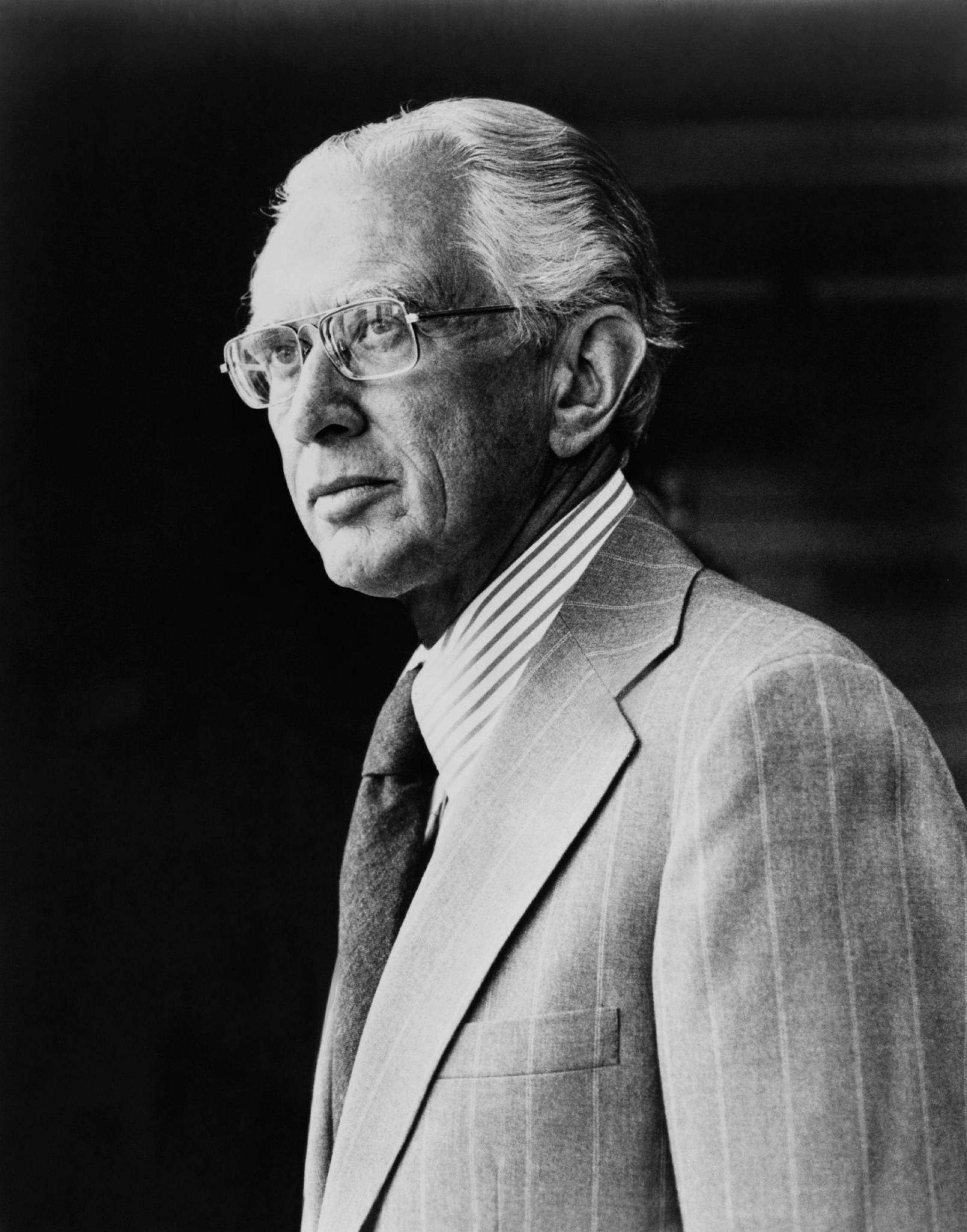

Nominee	Howard Metzenbaum	Paul Pfeifer
Party	Democratic	Republican
Popular vote	1,923,767	1,396,790
Percentage	56.66%	41.14%
- County results Metzenbaum: 50–60% 60–70% 70–80% Pfeifer: 50-60% 60-70%
U.S. senator before election
Howard Metzenbaum
Democratic
Elected U.S. Senator
Howard Metzenbaum
Democratic

Incumbent Democrat Howard Metzenbaum successfully sought re-election to his third term, defeating Republican state Senator from Bucyrus Paul Pfeifer.

Ohio election
Party	Candidate	Votes	%
Democratic	Howard Metzenbaum (incumbent)	1,923,767	56.7
Republican	Paul Pfeifer	1,396,790	41.1
Independent	Alicia Merel	38,803	1.1
Libertarian	Philip Herzing	36,103	1.1
Majority		526,977	15.5
Turnout		3,395,463	
Democratic hold			

== Pennsylvania ==
Pennsylvania election
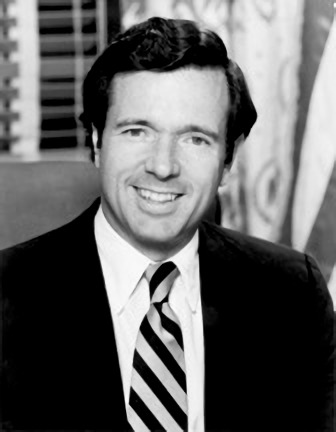

Nominee	John Heinz	Cyril Wecht
Party	Republican	Democratic
Popular vote	2,136,418	1,412,965
Percentage	59.3%	39.2%
- County results Heinz: 50–60% 60–70% 70–80% Wecht: 50–60% 60–70%
U.S. senator before election
H. John Heinz III
Republican
Elected U.S. Senator
H. John Heinz III
Republican

Incumbent Republican H. John Heinz III successfully sought re-election to another term, defeating Democratic nominee Cyril Wecht, member of the Allegheny County Board of Commissioners.

Heinz's Democratic opponent in the 1982 election was Allegheny County Commissioner and former coroner Wecht, who lacked significant name recognition outside of Pittsburgh, his home town. Although the 1982 elections were a setback nationally for incumbent President Ronald Reagan and the Republican Party, neither Heinz nor incumbent Republican Governor Dick Thornburgh, who was also up for re-election in 1982, were challenged by Democrats with statewide prominence. Wecht ran a low-budget campaign, lacking the assets to boost his name recognition; The Philadelphia Inquirer ran a headline dubbing the race "The Race for Senator No One Seemed to Notice." Despite this, Heinz ran a cautious campaign, running as a moderate due to Pennsylvania's unemployment rate, 11%, one of the highest in the nation at the time, as well as the declining health of Pennsylvania's coal mining, manufacturing and steel industries. In the end, Heinz won the election by a wide margin, with 59.3% of the popular vote. Wecht won 39.2% of the popular vote.

General election results
Party	Candidate	Votes	%	±%
Republican	H. John Heinz III (incumbent)	2,136,418	59.3	+6.9%
Democratic	Cyril Wecht	1,412,965	39.2	−7.6%
Libertarian	Barbara I. Karkutt	19,244	0.5	+0.5%
Socialist Workers	William H. Thomas	18,951	0.5	+0.4%
Consumer	Liane Norman	16,530	0.5	+0.5%
Majority		723,453	20.1	+14.5%
Turnout		3,604,108		
Republican hold		Swing		

== Rhode Island ==
Rhode Island election
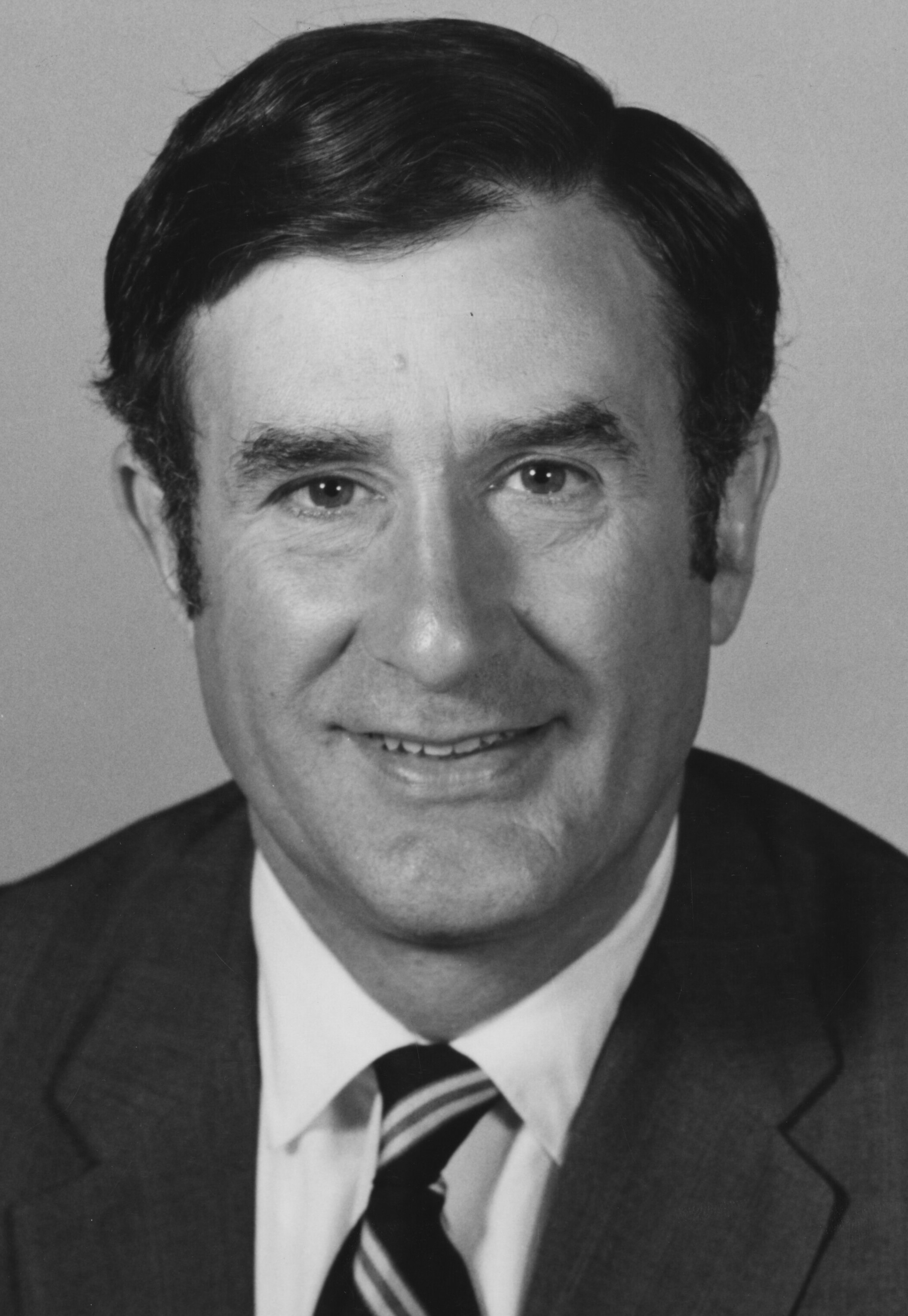

Nominee	John Chafee	Julius C. Michaelson
Party	Republican	Democratic
Popular vote	175,495	167,283
Percentage	51.2%	48.8%
- Chafee: 50–60% 60–70% 70–80% Michaelson: 50–60% 60–70%
U.S. senator before election
John Chafee
Republican
Elected U.S. Senator
John Chafee
Republican

Incumbent Republican John Chafee successfully sought re-election to a second term, defeating Democrat Julius C. Michaelson, former attorney general of Rhode Island.

Democratic primary results
Party	Candidate	Votes	%
Democratic	Julius C. Michaelson	56,800	82.4
Democratic	Helen E. Flynn	12,159	17.6
Majority		44,641	64.7
Total votes		68,959	100

General election results
Party	Candidate	Votes	%
Republican	John Chafee (incumbent)	175,495	51.2
Democratic	Julius C. Michaelson	167,283	48.8
Majority		8,212	2.4
Total votes		342,778	100
Republican hold			

== Tennessee ==
Tennessee election

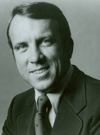
Nominee	Jim Sasser	Robin Beard
Party	Democratic	Republican
Popular vote	780,113	479,642
Percentage	61.9%	38.1%
- County results Sasser: 50–60% 60–70% 70–80% 80–90% Beard: 50–60%
Senator before election
Jim Sasser
Democratic
Elected Senator
Jim Sasser
Democratic

Democrat Jim Sasser was re-elected with 61.9% of the vote, over Republican Robin Beard, a member of the U.S. House of Representatives.

General election results
Party	Candidate	Votes	%
Democratic	Jim Sasser (incumbent)	780,113	61.9
Republican	Robin Beard	479,642	38.1
Majority		300,471	23.9
Turnout		1,259,755	
Democratic hold			

== Texas ==
Texas election
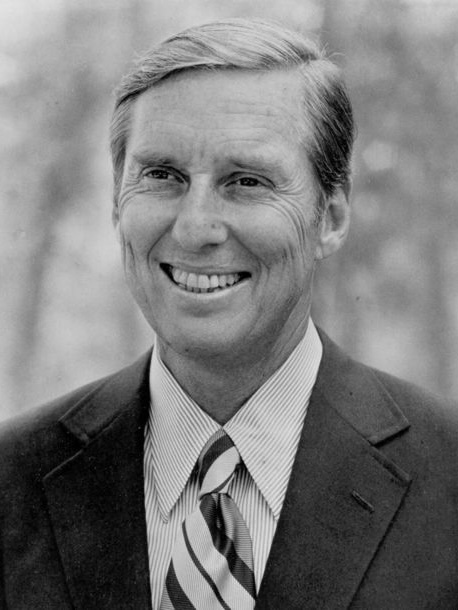

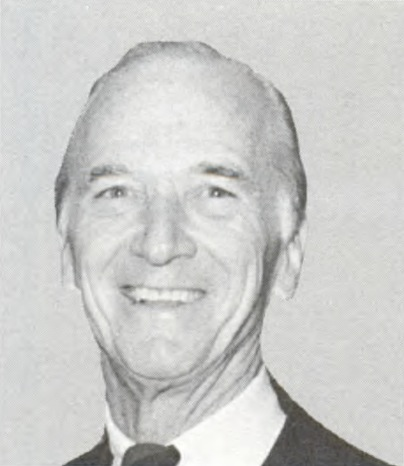
Nominee	Lloyd Bentsen	James M. Collins
Party	Democratic	Republican
Popular vote	1,818,223	1,256,759
Percentage	58.59%	40.50%
- County results Bentsen: 50–60% 60–70% 70–80% 80–90% Collins: 50–60% 60–70%
U.S. senator before election
Lloyd Bentsen
Democratic
Elected U.S. Senator
Lloyd Bentsen
Democratic

Incumbent Democrat Lloyd Bentsen successfully ran for re-election to his third term, defeating Republican U.S. Representative James M. Collins.

Texas election
Party	Candidate	Votes	%
Democratic	Lloyd Bentsen (incumbent)	1,818,223	58.6
Republican	James M. Collins	1,256,759	40.5
Libertarian	John E. Ford	23,494	0.8
Citizens	Lineaus Hooper Lorette	4,564	0.2
None	Write-Ins	127	0
Majority		561,464	18.1
Turnout		3,103,167	
Democratic hold			

== Utah ==
Utah election
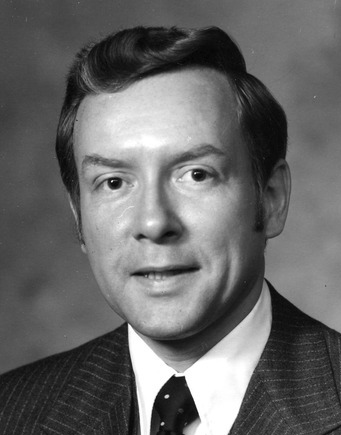

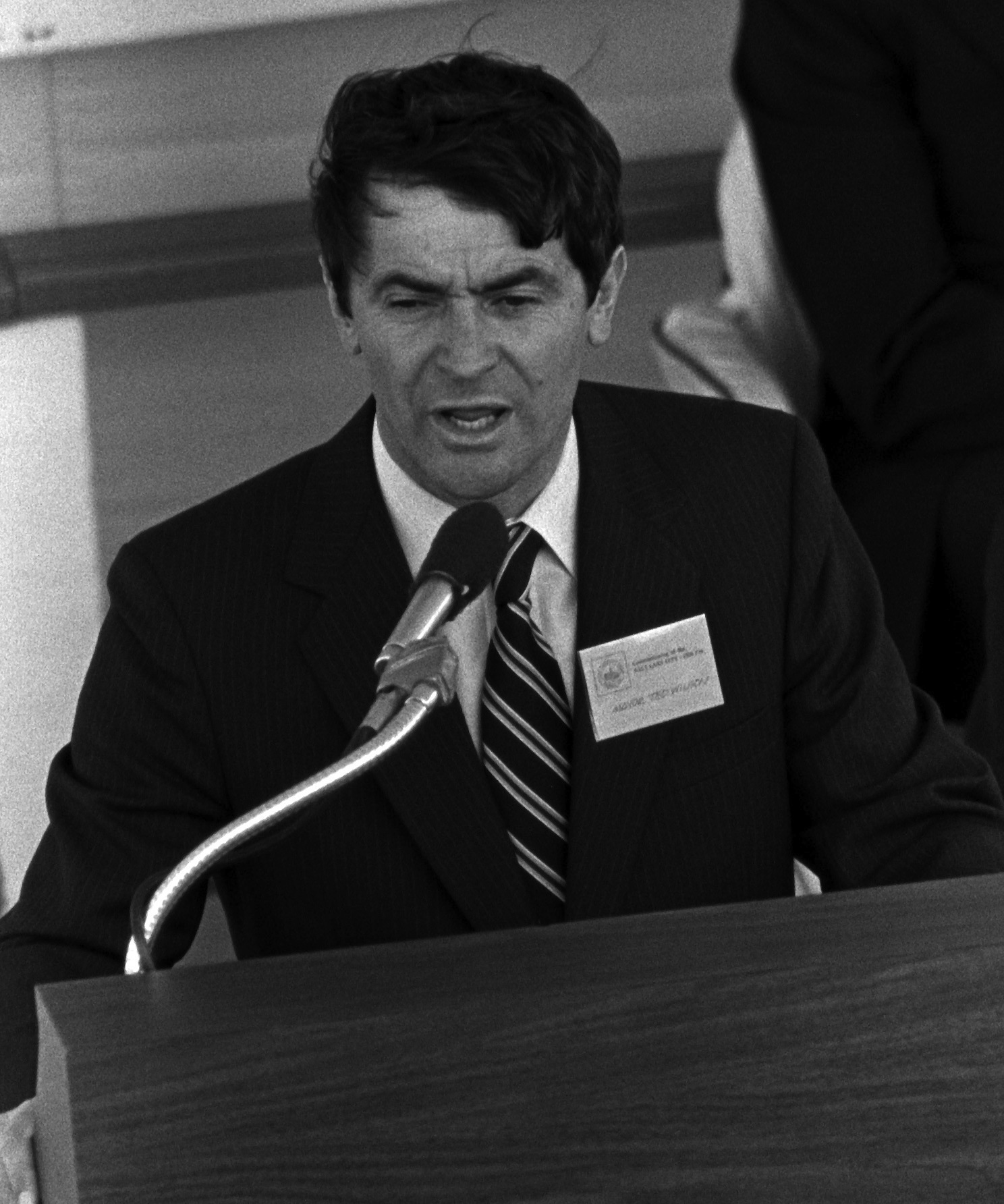
Nominee	Orrin Hatch	Ted Wilson
Party	Republican	Democratic
Popular vote	309,332	219,482
Percentage	58.3%	41.4%
- County results Hatch: 50-60% 60-70% 70-80% 80-90% Wilson: 50–60% 60–70%
U.S. senator before election
Orrin Hatch
Republican
Elected U.S. Senator
Orrin Hatch
Republican

Incumbent Republican Orrin Hatch successfully ran for re-election to his second term, defeating Democrat Mayor of Salt Lake City Ted Wilson.

Utah election
Party	Candidate	Votes	%
Republican	Orrin Hatch (incumbent)	309,332	58.3
Democratic	Ted Wilson	219,482	41.4
Libertarian	George Mercier	1,035	0.2
American	Lawrence R. Kauffman	953	0.2
Majority		89,850	16.9
Turnout		530,802	
Republican hold			

== Vermont ==
Vermont election
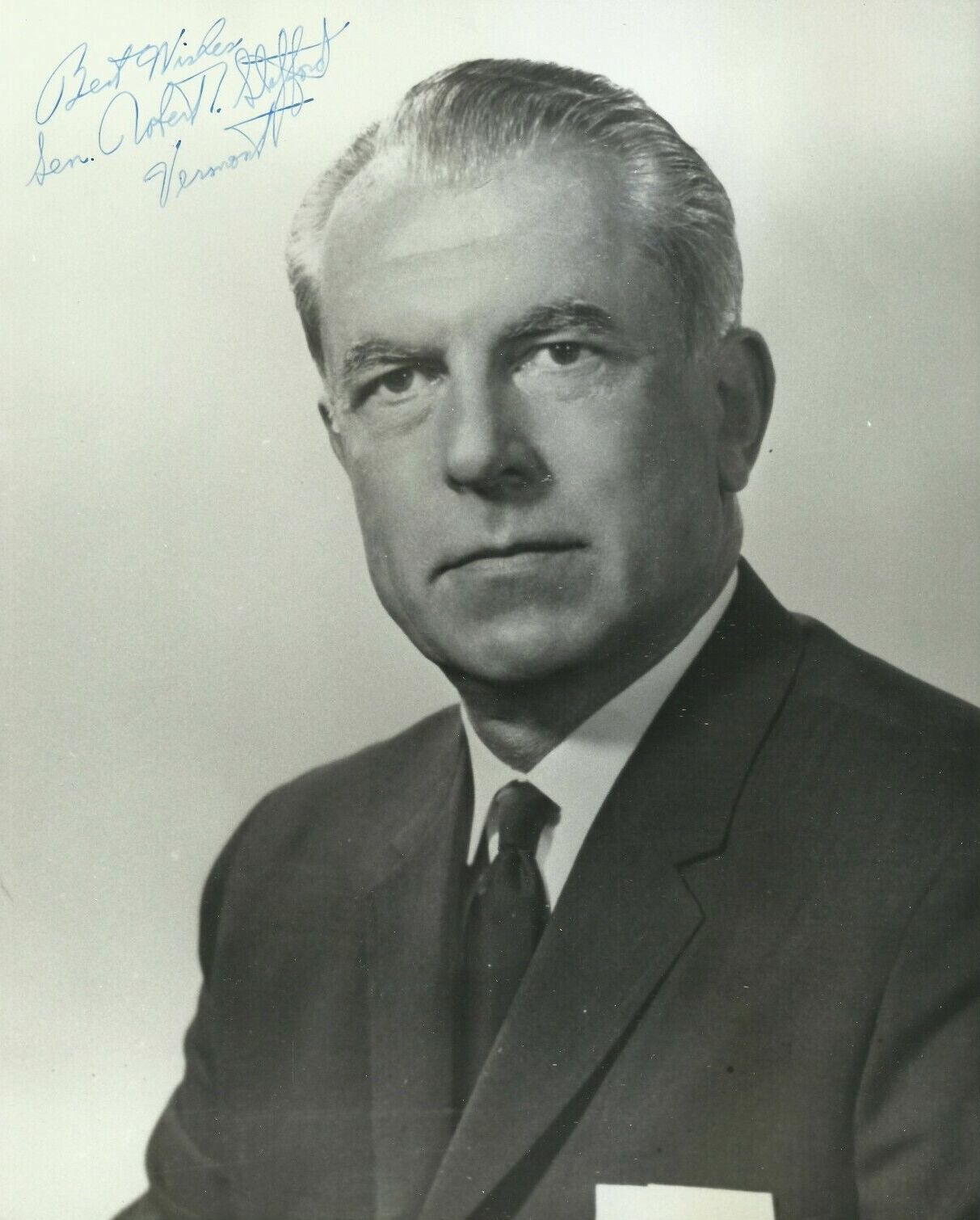

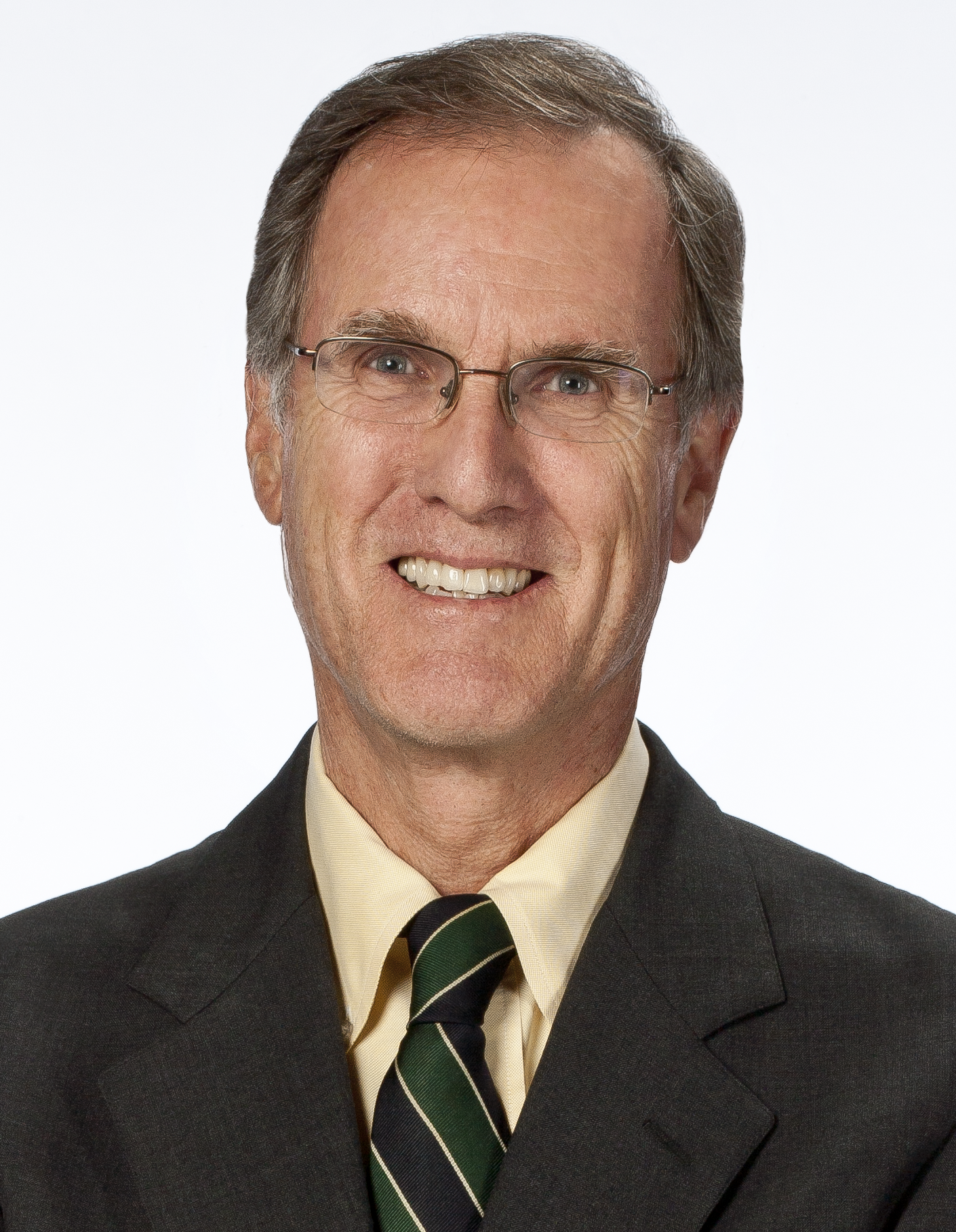
Nominee	Robert Stafford	James A. Guest
Party	Republican	Democratic
Popular vote	84,450	79,340
Percentage	50.3%	47.2%
- Stafford: 30-40% 40-50% 50-60% 60-70% 70-80% 80-90% Guest: 40-50% 50-60% 60-70%
U.S. senator before election
Robert Stafford
Republican
Elected U.S. Senator
Robert Stafford
Republican

Incumbent Republican Robert Stafford successfully ran for re-election to another term in the United States Senate, defeating Democratic candidate James A. Guest.

Republican primary results
Party	Candidate	Votes	%
Republican	Robert Stafford (incumbent)	26,323	46.2
Republican	Stewart M. Ledbetter	19,743	34.7
Republican	John McClaughry	10,692	18.8
Republican	Other	162	0.3
Total votes		'65,920'	'100'

Democratic primary results
Party	Candidate	Votes	%
Democratic	James A. Guest	11,352	67.1
Democratic	Thomas E. McGregor	3,749	22.2
Democratic	Earl S. Gardner	1,281	7.6
Democratic	Other	536	3.2
Total votes		'16,918'	'100'

Vermont election
Party	Candidate	Votes	%
Republican	Robert Stafford (incumbent)	84,450	50.3
Democratic	James A. Guest	79,340	47.2
Independent	Michael Edward Hackett	1,463	1.0
Independent	Ion Laskaris	897	0.5
Libertarian	Bo Adlerbert	892	0.5
N/A	Other	961	0.6
Total votes		168,003	'100'
Majority		5,109	3.0
Republican hold			

== Virginia ==
Virginia election
- Turnout: 35.7% (voting eligible)
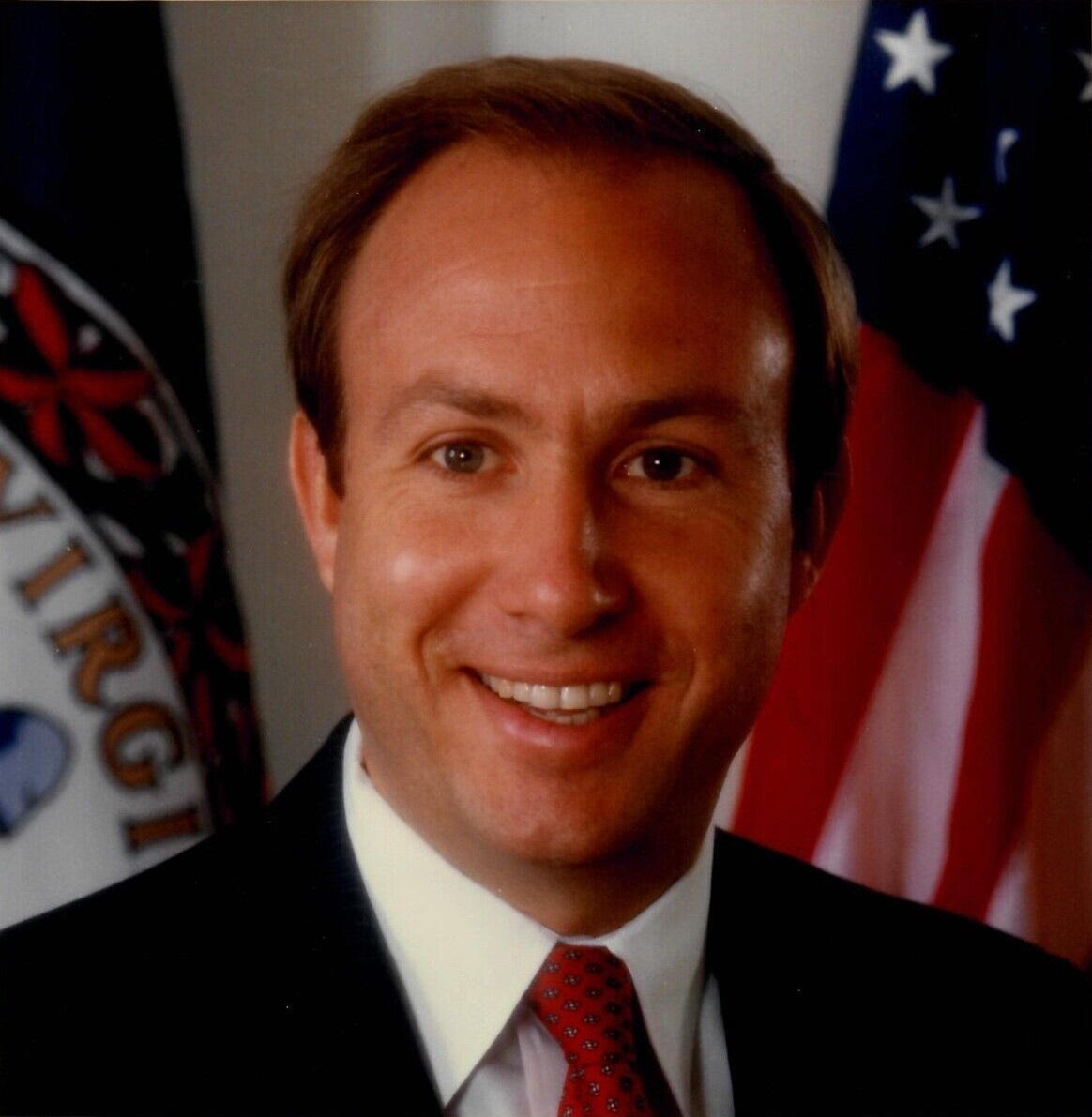

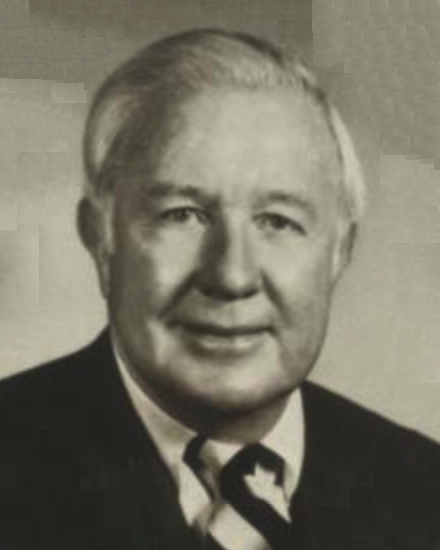
Nominee	Paul Trible	Dick Davis
Party	Republican	Democratic
Popular vote	724,571	690,839
Percentage	51.2%	48.8%
- County and independent city results Trible: 50–60% 60–70% 80–90% Davis: 50–60% 60–70% 70–80%
U.S. senator before election
Harry F. Byrd Jr.
Independent
Elected U.S. Senator
Paul Trible
Republican

U.S. Representative from Virginia's 1st district, Paul Trible replaced Independent Senator Harry F. Byrd Jr., who was stepping down after three terms. He beat Democratic Lieutenant Governor of Virginia, Richard Joseph Davis.

Virginia election
Party	Candidate	Votes	%	±%
Republican	Paul Trible	724,571	51.2	+51.2%
Democratic	Dick Davis	690,839	48.8	+10.5%
Write-ins		212	0	
Majority		33,732	2.4	−16.6%
Turnout		1,415,622		
Republican gain from Independent		Swing		

== Washington ==
Washington election
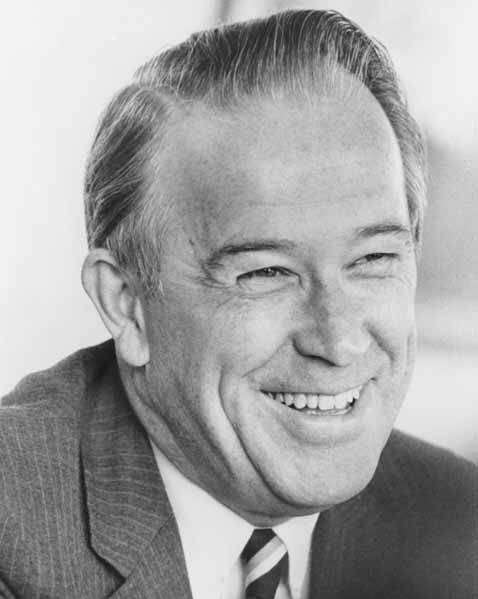

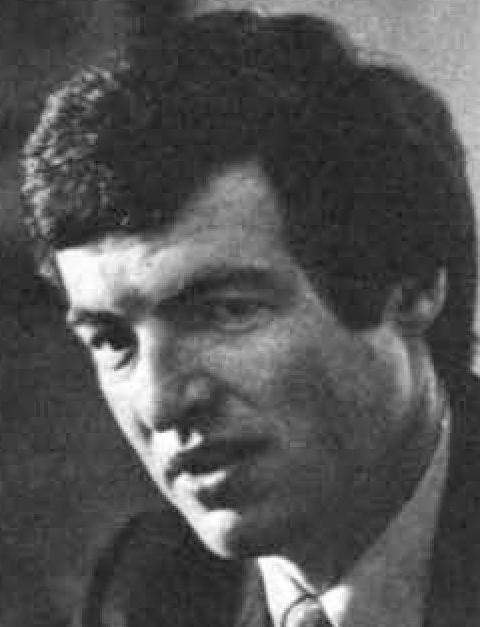

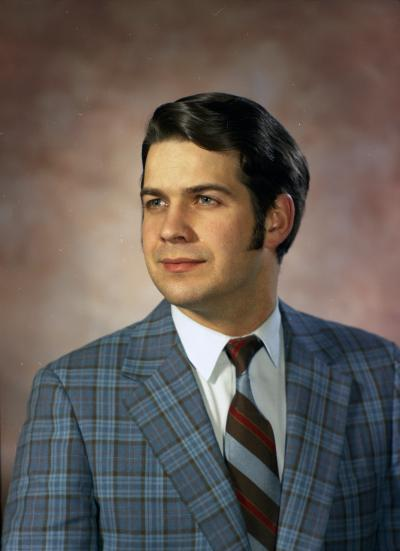
Nominee	Henry M. Jackson	Douglas Jewett	King Lysen
Party	Democratic	Republican	Independent
Popular vote	943,665	332,273	72,297
Percentage	68.96%	24.28%	5.28%
- County results Jackson: 40-50% 60-70% 70-80%
U.S. senator before election
Henry M. Jackson
Democratic
Elected U.S. Senator
Henry M. Jackson
Democratic

Incumbent Democrat Henry M. Jackson successfully ran for re-election to his sixth and final term, defeating Republican challenger Doug Jewett, a Seattle city attorney and independent King Lysen, a state senator.

Washington election
Party	Candidate	Votes	%
Democratic	Henry M. Jackson (incumbent)	943,655	69.0
Republican	Doug Jewett	332,273	24.3
Independent	King Lysen	72,297	5.3
Independent	Jesse Chiang	20,251	1.5
Majority		611,382	44.7
Turnout		1,368,476	
Democratic hold			

== West Virginia ==
West Virginia election
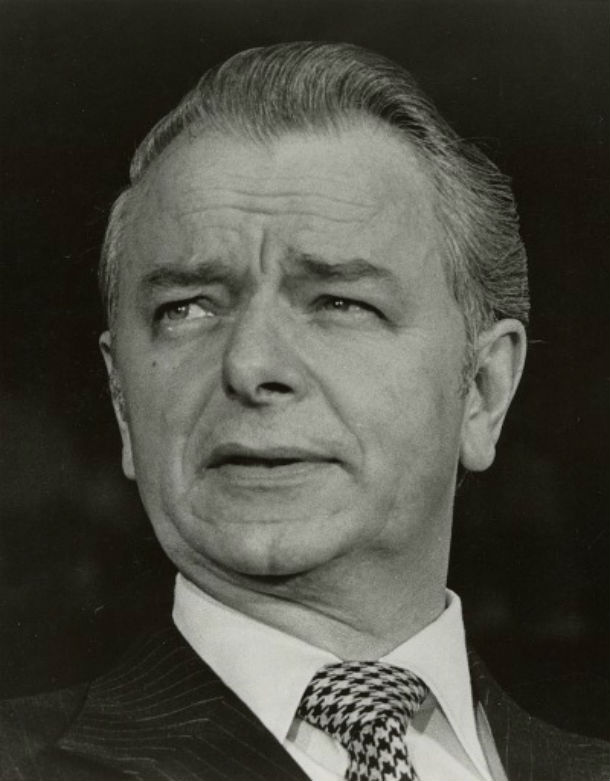

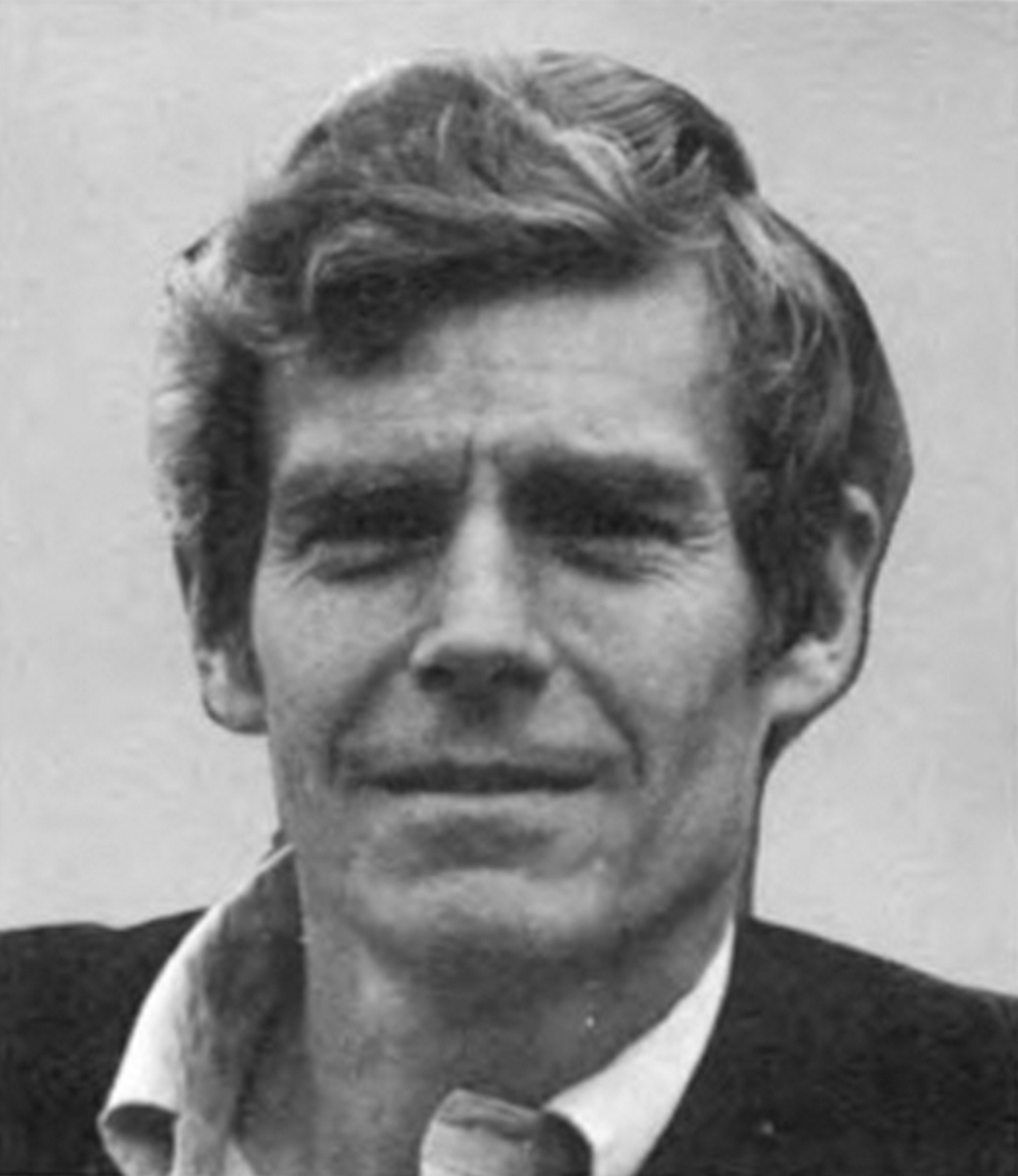
Nominee	Robert Byrd	Cleve Benedict
Party	Democratic	Republican
Popular vote	387,170	173,910
Percentage	68.5%	30.8%
- County results Byrd: 40–50% 50–60% 60–70% 70–80% 80–90% Benedict: 50–60%
U.S. senator before election
Robert Byrd
Democratic
Elected U.S. Senator
Robert Byrd
Democratic

Incumbent Democrat Robert Byrd won re-election to a fifth term over Republican Cleve Benedict, a freshman member of the House.

Benedict made great note of Byrd's record of high office in the Ku Klux Klan, his avoidance of service in World War II, and the fact that Byrd, then alone among members of Congress, owned no home in the state he represented. His campaign represented the last serious and well-funded effort to unseat Byrd, spending $1,098,218. Byrd was minority leader at the time.

General election
Party	Candidate	Votes	%
Democratic	Robert Byrd (incumbent)	387,170	68.5
Republican	Cleve Benedict	173,910	30.8
Majority		213,260	37.7
Turnout		565,314	
Democratic hold			

== Wisconsin ==
Wisconsin election
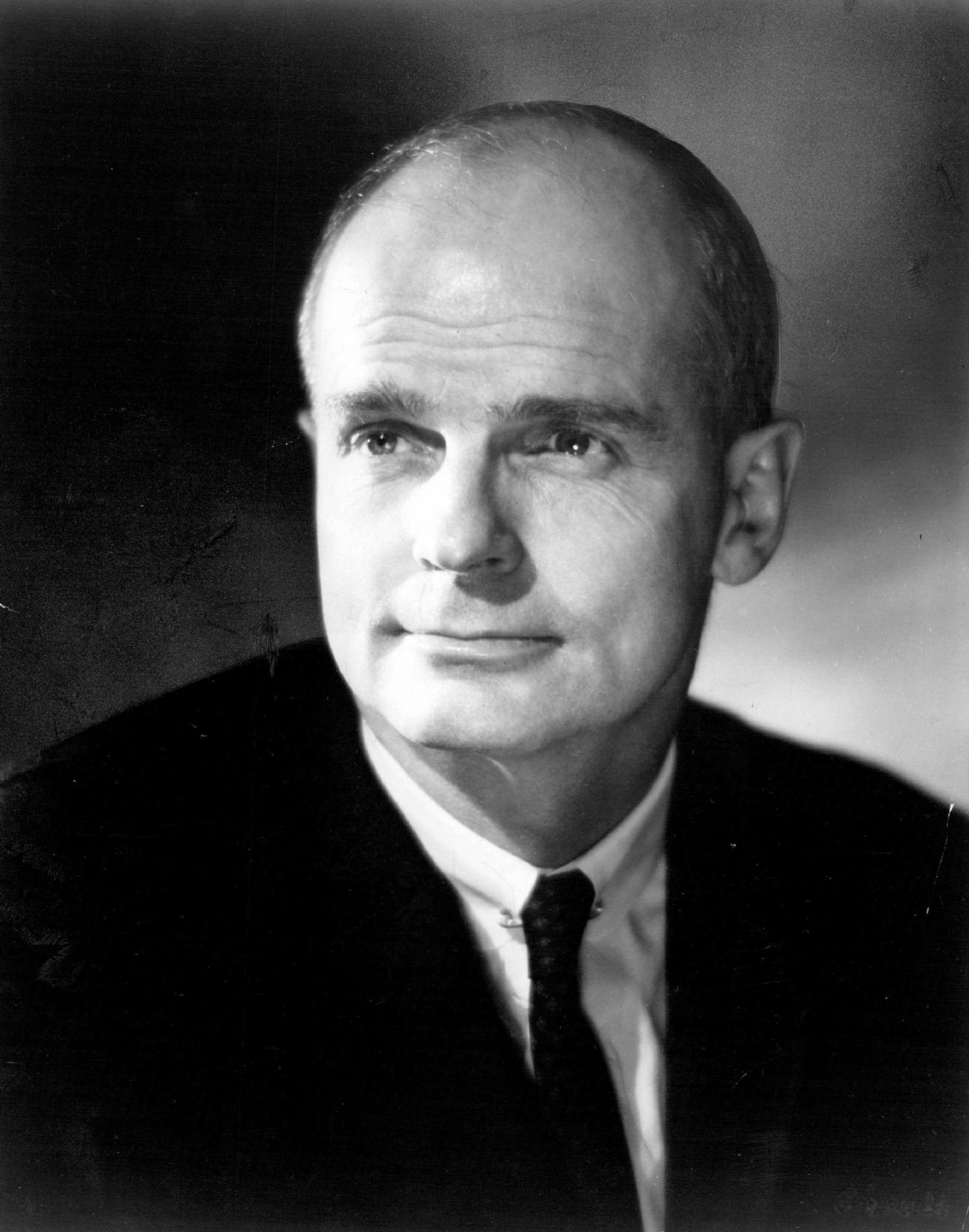

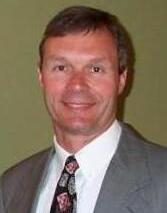
Nominee	William Proxmire	Scott McCallum
Party	Democratic	Republican
Popular vote	983,311	527,355
Percentage	63.65%	34.14%
- County results Proxmire: 40–50% 50–60% 60–70% 70–80% 80–90% McCallum: 50-60%
U.S. senator before election
William Proxmire
Democratic
Elected U.S. Senator
William Proxmire
Democratic

Incumbent Democrat William Proxmire successfully ran for re-election to his fifth and final term, defeating Republican state Representative Scott McCallum.

Wisconsin election
Party	Candidate	Votes	%
Democratic	William Proxmire (incumbent)	983,311	63.7
Republican	Scott McCallum	527,355	34.1
Labor–Farm	William Osborne Hart	21,807	1.4
Libertarian	George Liljenfeldt	7,947	0.5
Constitution	Sanford G. Knapp	4,463	0.29
Majority		455,956	29.5
Turnout		1,544,883	
Democratic hold			

== Wyoming ==
Wyoming election
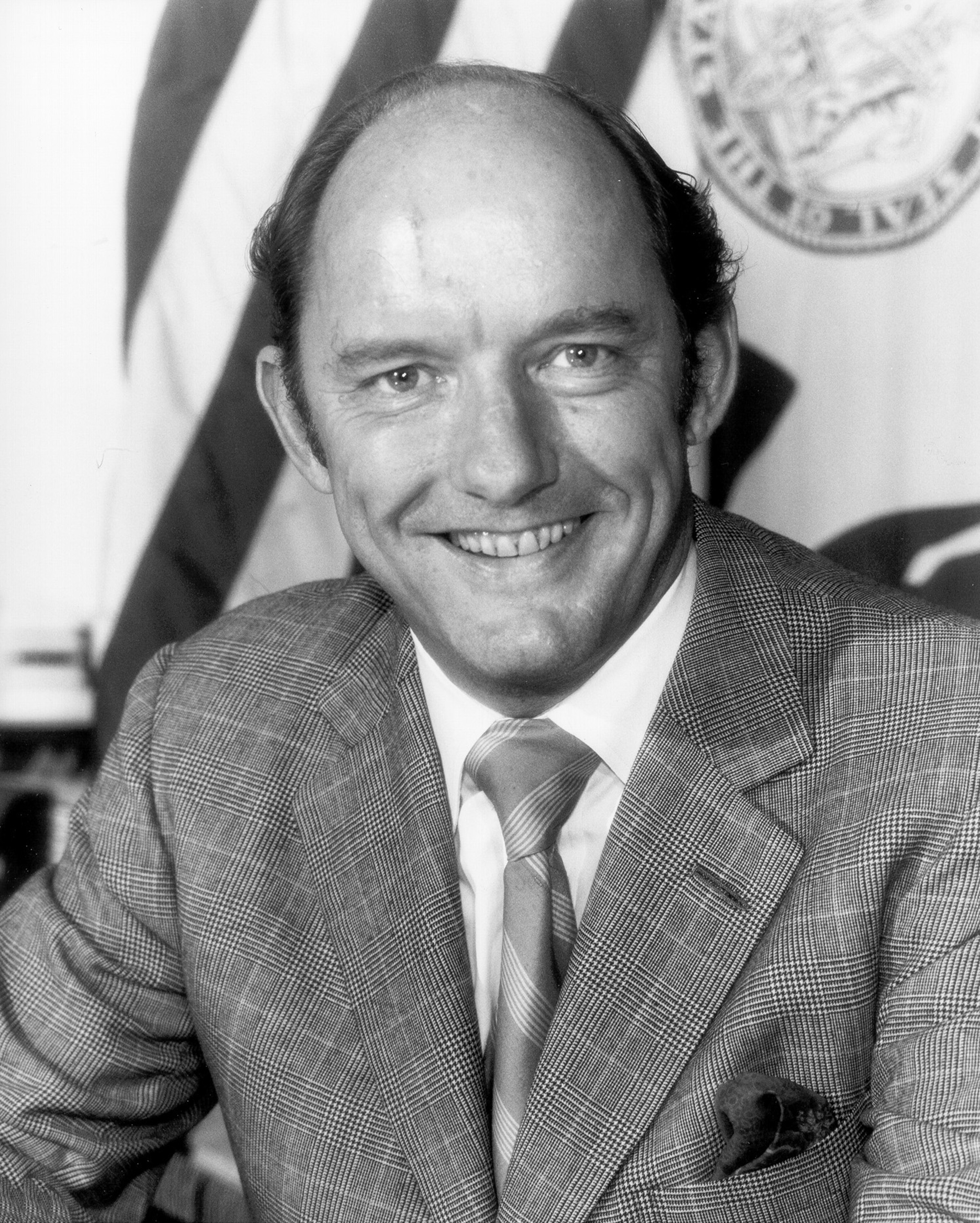

Nominee	Malcolm Wallop	Rodger McDaniel
Party	Republican	Democratic
Popular vote	94,725	72,466
Percentage	56.66%	43.34%
- County results Wallop: 50-60% 60-70% 70-80% McDaniel: 50–60%
U.S. senator before election
Malcolm Wallop
Republican
Elected U.S. Senator
Malcolm Wallop
Republican

Incumbent Republican U.S. Senator Malcolm Wallop was re-elected to a second term in office, defeating Democratic sltate Senator Rodger McDaniel.

Wyoming election
Party	Candidate	Votes	%
Republican	Malcolm Wallop (incumbent)	94,725	56.7
Democratic	Rodger McDaniel	72,466	43.3
Majority		22,259	13.3
Turnout		167,191	
Republican hold			

== See also ==
- 1982 United States elections
  - 1982 United States gubernatorial elections
  - 1982 United States House of Representatives elections
- 97th United States Congress
- 98th United States Congress
