= 1988 United States Senate elections =

- November 8, 1988
- Class 1

33 of the 100 seats in the United States Senate 51 seats needed for a majority
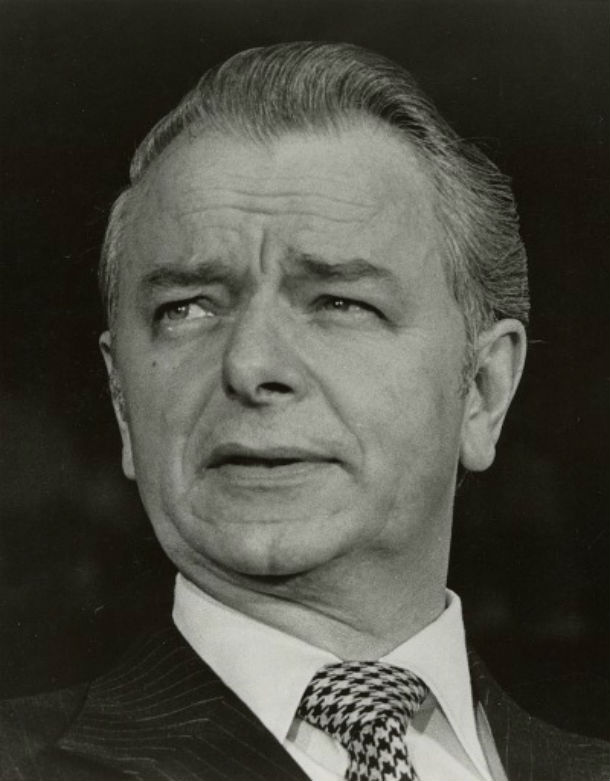

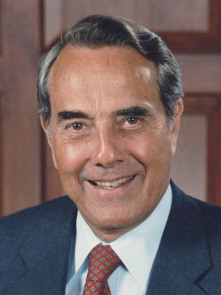
	Majority party	Minority party
Leader	Robert Byrd	Bob Dole
Party	Democratic	Republican
Leader since	January 3, 1977	January 3, 1985
Leader's seat	West Virginia	Kansas
Seats before	54	46
Seats after	55	45
Seat change	▲1	▼1
Popular vote	35,137,786	31,151,251
Percentage	52.1%	46.2%
Seats up	18	15
Races won	19	14
- Results of the elections: Democratic gain Democratic hold Republican gain Republican hold No election
Majority Leader before election
Robert Byrd
Democratic
Elected Majority Leader
George Mitchell
Democratic

The 1988 United States Senate elections were elections for the United States Senate. Held on November 8, 1988, the 33 seats of Class 1 were contested in regular elections. In spite of the Republican victory by George H. W. Bush in the presidential election, the Democrats gained a net of one seat in the Senate. Seven seats changed parties, with four incumbents being defeated. The Democratic majority in the Senate increased by one to 55–45.

This is the last Senate election cycle in which California voted for a Republican, the last in which Texas and Maine voted for a Democrat until 2026, (Note: Angus King, who was elected in 2012 and re-elected in 2018 and 2024, is an independent who caucuses with the Democrats, but is not actually a member of the party.) and the last time Arizona voted for a Democrat until 2018. This would also be the last Senate election cycle until 1998 to not have at least one special election during that cycle.

This is also the last Senate election cycle in which no woman was elected to the Senate from either party, as all of the winners were men.

== Results summary ==
Summary of the 1988 United States Senate election results

↓
55	45
Democratic	Republican

Parties						Total
Parties	Democratic	Republican	Libertarian	Conservative	Other	Total
Last elections (1986)	55	45	0	0	0	100
Before these elections	54	46	0	0	0	100
Not up	36	31	—	—	—	67
Up Class 1 (1982→1988)	18	15	—	—	—	33
Incumbent retired	3	3	—	—	—	6
Held by same party	1	2	—	—	—	3
Replaced by other party	▼1 Republican replaced by ▲1 Democrat ▼2 Democrats replaced by ▲2 Republicans		—	—	—	3
Result	2	4	—	—	—	6
Incumbent ran	15	12 (Note: Includes the interim appointee who ran for election.)	—	—	—	27
Won re-election	14	9	—	—	—	23
Lost re-election	▼3 Republicans replaced by ▲3 Democrats ▼1 Democrat replaced by ▲1 Republican		—	—	—	4
Lost renomination, but held by same party	0	0	—	—	—	0
Result	17	10	—	—	—	27
Total elected	19	14	—	—	—	33
Net gain/loss	▲1	▼1	Steady	Steady	Steady	1
Nationwide vote	35,137,786	31,151,251	268,053	189,226	677,928	67,424,244
Share	52.11%	46.20%	0.40%	0.28%	1.01%	100%
Result	55	45	0	0	0	100

Source: Clerk of the United States House of Representatives. "Statistics of the Presidential and Congressional Election of November 8, 1988" (PDF). U.S. Government Printing Office.

== Gains and losses ==
=== Retirements ===
Map of retirements: Republican incumbent Democratic incumbent Democratic incumbent retired Republican incumbent retired

Three Republicans and three Democrats retired instead of seeking re-election.

State	Senator	Age at end of term	Assumed office	Replaced by
Florida	Lawton Chiles	58	1971	Connie Mack III
Mississippi	John C. Stennis	83	1947 (Note: Elected in the special election to finish Theodore Bilbo's term, who died that year.)	Trent Lott
Vermont	Robert Stafford	75	1971 (Note: Appointed to the seat following the death of Winston L. Prouty.)	Jim Jeffords
Virginia	Paul Trible	42	1983	Chuck Robb
Washington	Daniel J. Evans	63	1983 (Note: Appointed to the seat following the death of Henry M. Jackson.)	Slade Gorton
Wisconsin	William Proxmire	73	1957 (Note: Elected in the special election to finish Joseph McCarthy's term, who died that year.)	Herb Kohl

=== Defeats ===
Three Republicans and one Democrat sought re-election but lost in the general election.

State	Senator	Assumed office	Replaced by
Connecticut	Lowell Weicker	1971	Joe Lieberman
Montana	John Melcher	1977	Conrad Burns
Nebraska	David Karnes	1987 (Note: Appointed to the seat following the death of Edward Zorinsky.)	Bob Kerrey
Nevada	Chic Hecht	1983	Richard Bryan

=== Post-election changes ===
One Republican resigned on January 3, 1989, while one Democrat died on May 16, 1990. Initially, they were replaced by appointees. In New Hampshire, a regular scheduled election was held in the 1990 Senate elections for the Class 2 term, where Bob Smith won the election to succeed Republican incumbent Gordon Humphrey, who resigned early to take his seat in the New Hampshire Senate.

State	Senator	Replaced by
Hawaii (Class 1)	Spark Matsunaga	Daniel Akaka
Indiana (Class 3)	Dan Quayle	Dan Coats
New Hampshire (Class 2)	Gordon Humphrey	Bob Smith

== Change in composition ==
=== Before the elections ===
D_{1}	D_{2}	D_{3}	D_{4}	D_{5}	D_{6}	D_{7}	D_{8}	D_{9}	D_{10}
D_{20}	D_{19}	D_{18}	D_{17}	D_{16}	D_{15}	D_{14}	D_{13}	D_{12}	D_{11}
D_{21}	D_{22}	D_{23}	D_{24}	D_{25}	D_{26}	D_{27}	D_{28}	D_{29}	D_{30}
D_{40} Maine; Ran	D_{39} Hawaii; Ran	D_{38} Fla. Retired	D_{37} Ariz. Ran	D_{36}	D_{35}	D_{34}	D_{33}	D_{32}	D_{31}
D_{41} Md. Ran	D_{42} Mass. Ran	D_{43} Mich. Ran	D_{44} Miss. Retired	D_{45} Mont. Ran	D_{46} N.J. Ran	D_{47} N.M. Ran	D_{48} N.Y. Ran	D_{49} N.D. Ran	D_{50} Ohio; Ran
Majority →									D_{51} Tenn. Ran
R_{41} R.I. Ran	R_{42} Utah; Ran	R_{43} Vt. Retired	R_{44} Va. Retired	R_{45} Wash. Retired	R_{46} Wyo. Ran	D_{54} Wis. Retired	D_{53} W.Va. Ran	D_{52} Texas; Ran	D_{51} Tenn. Ran
R_{40} Pa. Ran	R_{39} Nev. Ran	R_{38} Neb. Ran	R_{37} Mo. Ran	R_{36} Minn. Ran	R_{35} Ind. Ran	R_{34} Del. Ran	R_{33} Conn. Ran	R_{32} Calif. Ran	R_{31}
R_{21}	R_{22}	R_{23}	R_{24}	R_{25}	R_{26}	R_{27}	R_{28}	R_{29}	R_{30}
R_{20}	R_{19}	R_{18}	R_{17}	R_{16}	R_{15}	R_{14}	R_{13}	R_{12}	R_{11}
R_{1}	R_{2}	R_{3}	R_{4}	R_{5}	R_{6}	R_{7}	R_{8}	R_{9}	R_{10}

=== After the elections ===
D_{1}	D_{2}	D_{3}	D_{4}	D_{5}	D_{6}	D_{7}	D_{8}	D_{9}	D_{10}
D_{20}	D_{19}	D_{18}	D_{17}	D_{16}	D_{15}	D_{14}	D_{13}	D_{12}	D_{11}
D_{21}	D_{22}	D_{23}	D_{24}	D_{25}	D_{26}	D_{27}	D_{28}	D_{29}	D_{30}
D_{40} Md. Re-elected	D_{39} Maine; Re-elected	D_{38} Hawaii; Re-elected	D_{37} Ariz. Re-elected	D_{36}	D_{35}	D_{34}	D_{33}	D_{32}	D_{31}
D_{41} Mass. Re-elected	D_{42} Mich. Re-elected	D_{43} N.J. Re-elected	D_{44} N.M. Re-elected	D_{45} N.Y. Re-elected	D_{46} N.D. Re-elected	D_{47} Ohio; Re-elected	D_{48} Tenn. Re-elected	D_{49} Texas; Re-elected	D_{50} W.Va. Re-elected
Majority →									D_{51} Wis. Hold
R_{41} Wash. Hold	R_{42} Wyo. Re-elected	R_{43} Fla. Gain	R_{44} Miss. Gain	R_{45} Mont. Gain	D_{55} Va. Gain	D_{54} Nev. Gain	D_{53} Neb. Gain (Note: Appointee defeated)	D_{52} Conn. Gain	D_{51} Wis. Hold
R_{40} Vt. Hold	R_{39} Utah; Re-elected	R_{38} R.I. Re-elected	R_{37} Pa. Re-elected	R_{36} Mo. Re-elected	R_{35} Minn. Re-elected	R_{34} Ind. Re-elected	R_{33} Del. Re-elected	R_{32} Calif. Re-elected	R_{31}
R_{21}	R_{22}	R_{23}	R_{24}	R_{25}	R_{26}	R_{27}	R_{28}	R_{29}	R_{30}
R_{20}	R_{19}	R_{18}	R_{17}	R_{16}	R_{15}	R_{14}	R_{13}	R_{12}	R_{11}
R_{1}	R_{2}	R_{3}	R_{4}	R_{5}	R_{6}	R_{7}	R_{8}	R_{9}	R_{10}

Key	D_{#} / Democratic; R_{#} / Republican

== Race summary ==
=== Special elections ===
There were no special elections in 1988.

=== Elections leading to the next Congress ===
In these general elections, the winners were elected for the term beginning January 3, 1989; ordered by state.

All of the elections involved the Class 1 seats.

State	Incumbent			Result	Candidates
State	Senator	Party	Electoral history	Result	Candidates
Arizona	Dennis DeConcini	Democratic	1976; 1982	Incumbent re-elected.	▌ ✓ Dennis DeConcini (Democratic) 56.7%; ▌Keith DeGreen (Republican) 41.1%; ▌Rich Tompkins (Libertarian) 1.8%
California	Pete Wilson	Republican	1982	Incumbent re-elected.	▌ ✓ Pete Wilson (Republican) 52.7%; ▌Leo T. McCarthy (Democratic) 44.0%; Others: ▌Maria E. Muñoz (Peace and Freedom) 1.7%; ▌Jack Dean (Libertarian) 0.8%; ▌Merton D. Short (American Independent) 0.7%
Connecticut	Lowell Weicker	Republican	1970; 1976; 1982	Incumbent lost re-election. Democratic gain.	▌ ✓ Joe Lieberman (Democratic) 49.7%; ▌Lowell Weicker (Republican) 49.0%; Others: ▌Howard Grayson (Libertarian) 0.9%; ▌Melissa Fisher (New Alliance) 0.3%
Delaware	William Roth	Republican	1970; 1971 (appointed); 1976; 1982	Incumbent re-elected.	▌ ✓ William Roth (Republican) 62.1%; ▌S. B. Woo (Democratic) 37.9%
Florida	Lawton Chiles	Democratic	1970; 1976; 1982	Incumbent retired. Republican gain.	▌ ✓ Connie Mack III (Republican) 50.4%; ▌Buddy MacKay (Democratic) 49.6%
Hawaii	Spark Matsunaga	Democratic	1976; 1982	Incumbent re-elected.	▌ ✓ Spark Matsunaga (Democratic) 76.5%; ▌Maria M. Hustace (Republican) 20.7%; ▌Ken Schoolland (Libertarian) 2.8%
Indiana	Richard Lugar	Republican	1976; 1982	Incumbent re-elected.	▌ ✓ Richard Lugar (Republican) 67.7%; ▌Jack Wickes (Democratic) 32.3%
Maine	George J. Mitchell	Democratic	1980 (appointed); 1982	Incumbent re-elected.	▌ ✓ George J. Mitchell (Democratic) 81.1%; ▌Jasper S. Wyman (Republican) 18.9%
Maryland	Paul Sarbanes	Democratic	1976; 1982	Incumbent re-elected.	▌ ✓ Paul Sarbanes (Democratic) 61.8%; ▌Alan Keyes (Republican) 38.2%
Massachusetts	Ted Kennedy	Democratic	1962 (special); 1964; 1970; 1976; 1982	Incumbent re-elected.	▌ ✓ Ted Kennedy (Democratic) 65.0%; ▌Joe Malone (Republican) 33.9%; Others: ▌Mary Fridley (New Alliance) 0.6%; ▌Freda Lee Nason (Libertarian) 0.5%
Michigan	Donald Riegle	Democratic	1976; 1976 (appointed); 1982	Incumbent re-elected.	▌ ✓ Donald Riegle (Democratic) 60.4%; ▌James Whitney Dunn (Republican) 38.5%; Others: ▌Dick Jacobs (Libertarian) 0.8%; ▌Sally Bier (Workers Against Concessions) 0.3%
Minnesota	David Durenberger	Republican	1978 (special); 1982	Incumbent re-elected.	▌ ✓ David Durenberger (Republican) 56.2%; ▌Skip Humphrey (DFL) 40.9%; Others: ▌Polly Mann (Progressive Issues) 2.1%; ▌Derrick Grimmer (Grassroots) 0.4%; ▌Arlen Overvig (Libertarian) 0.2%; ▌Wendy Lyons (Socialist Workers) 0.1%
Mississippi	John C. Stennis	Democratic	1947 (special); 1952; 1958; 1964; 1970; 1976; 1982	Incumbent retired. Republican gain.	▌ ✓ Trent Lott (Republican) 54.1%; ▌Wayne Dowdy (Democratic) 45.9%
Missouri	John Danforth	Republican	1976; 1976 (appointed); 1982	Incumbent re-elected.	▌ ✓ John Danforth (Republican) 67.7%; ▌Jay Nixon (Democratic) 31.7%; ▌John Guze (Libertarian) 0.6%
Montana	John Melcher	Democratic	1976; 1982	Incumbent lost re-election. Republican gain.	▌ ✓ Conrad Burns (Republican) 51.9%; ▌John Melcher (Democratic) 48.1%
Nebraska	David Karnes	Republican	1987 (appointed)	Interim appointee lost election. Democratic gain.	▌ ✓ Bob Kerrey (Democratic) 56.7%; ▌David Karnes (Republican) 41.7%; ▌Ernie Chambers (New Alliance) 1.6%
Nevada	Chic Hecht	Republican	1982	Incumbent lost re-election. Democratic gain.	▌ ✓ Richard Bryan (Democratic) 51.3%; ▌Chic Hecht (Republican) 47.1%; ▌James Frye (Libertarian) 1.6%
New Jersey	Frank Lautenberg	Democratic	1982; 1982 (appointed)	Incumbent re-elected.	▌ ✓ Frank Lautenberg (Democratic) 53.5%; ▌Pete Dawkins (Republican) 45.2%; Others: ▌Joseph Job (Independent) 0.7%; ▌Jerry Zeldin (Libertarian) 0.4%; ▌Thomas Fiske (Socialist Workers) 0.2%
New Mexico	Jeff Bingaman	Democratic	1982	Incumbent re-elected.	▌ ✓ Jeff Bingaman (Democratic) 63.2%; ▌Bill Valentine (Republican) 36.8%
New York	Daniel Patrick Moynihan	Democratic	1976; 1982	Incumbent re-elected.	▌ ✓ Daniel Patrick Moynihan (Democratic) 67.3%; ▌Robert R. McMillan (Republican) 31.6%
North Dakota	Quentin Burdick	Democratic-NPL	1960 (special); 1964; 1970; 1976; 1982	Incumbent re-elected.	▌ ✓ Quentin Burdick (Democratic-NPL) 59.5%; ▌Earl Strinden (Republican) 39.1%; ▌Kenneth C. Gardner (Libertarian) 1.5%
Ohio	Howard Metzenbaum	Democratic	1974 (appointed); 1974 (lost); 1974 (resigned); 1976; 1976 (appointed); 1982	Incumbent re-elected.	▌ ✓ Howard Metzenbaum (Democratic) 56.9%; ▌George Voinovich (Republican) 43.1%
Pennsylvania	John Heinz	Republican	1976; 1982	Incumbent re-elected.	▌ ✓ John Heinz (Republican) 66.4%; ▌Joe Vignola (Democratic) 32.4%; Others: ▌Darcy Richardson (Consumer) 0.6%; ▌Henry Haller (Libertarian) 0.3%; ▌Samuel Cross (Populist) 0.1%; ▌Sam Blancato (New Alliance) 0.1%
Rhode Island	John Chafee	Republican	1976; 1976 (appointed); 1982	Incumbent re-elected.	▌ ✓ John Chafee (Republican) 54.3%; ▌Richard A. Licht (Democratic) 45.7%
Tennessee	Jim Sasser	Democratic	1976; 1982	Incumbent re-elected.	▌ ✓ Jim Sasser (Democratic) 65.1%; ▌Bill Anderson (Republican) 34.5%; ▌Khalil-Ullah Al-Muhaymin (Independent) 0.4%
Texas	Lloyd Bentsen	Democratic	1970; 1976; 1982	Incumbent re-elected.	▌ ✓ Lloyd Bentsen (Democratic) 59.2%; ▌Beau Boulter (Republican) 40.0%; ▌Jeff Daiell (Libertarian) 0.8%
Utah	Orrin Hatch	Republican	1976; 1982	Incumbent re-elected.	▌ ✓ Orrin Hatch (Republican) 67.1%; ▌Brian Moss (Democratic) 31.7%; Others: ▌Robert J. Smith (American) 0.9%; ▌William M. Arth (Socialist Workers) 0.2%
Vermont	Robert Stafford	Republican	1971 (appointed); 1972 (special); 1976; 1982	Incumbent retired. Republican hold.	▌ ✓ Jim Jeffords (Republican) 67.9%; ▌William Gray (Democratic) 29.8%; Others: ▌Jerry Levy (Liberty Union) 1.1%; ▌King Milne (Independent) 1.0%
Virginia	Paul Trible	Republican	1982	Incumbent retired. Democratic gain.	▌ ✓ Chuck Robb (Democratic) 71.2%; ▌Maurice A. Dawkins (Republican) 28.8%
Washington	Daniel J. Evans	Republican	1983 (appointed); 1983 (special)	Incumbent retired. Republican hold.	▌ ✓ Slade Gorton (Republican) 50.7%; ▌Mike Lowry (Democratic) 49.3%
West Virginia	Robert Byrd	Democratic	1958; 1964; 1970; 1976; 1982	Incumbent re-elected.	▌ ✓ Robert Byrd (Democratic) 63.2%; ▌M. Jay Wolfe (Republican) 36.8%
Wisconsin	William Proxmire	Democratic	1957 (special); 1958; 1964; 1970; 1976; 1982	Incumbent retired. Democratic hold.	▌ ✓ Herb Kohl (Democratic) 52.2%; ▌Susan Engeleiter (Republican) 47.8%
Wyoming	Malcolm Wallop	Republican	1976; 1982	Incumbent re-elected.	▌ ✓ Malcolm Wallop (Republican) 50.4%; ▌John Vinich (Democratic) 49.6%

== Closest races ==
In eleven races the margin of victory was under 10%.

State	Party of winner	Margin
Wyoming	Republican	0.73%
Connecticut	Democratic (flip)	0.77%
Florida	Republican (flip)	0.85%
Washington	Republican	2.17%
Montana	Republican (flip)	3.73%
Nevada	Democratic (flip)	4.06%
Wisconsin	Democratic	4.53%
Mississippi	Republican (flip)	7.82%
New Jersey	Democratic	8.37%
California	Republican	8.77%
Rhode Island	Republican	9.19%

Ohio was the tipping point state, with a margin of 13.95%.

== Arizona ==
Arizona election
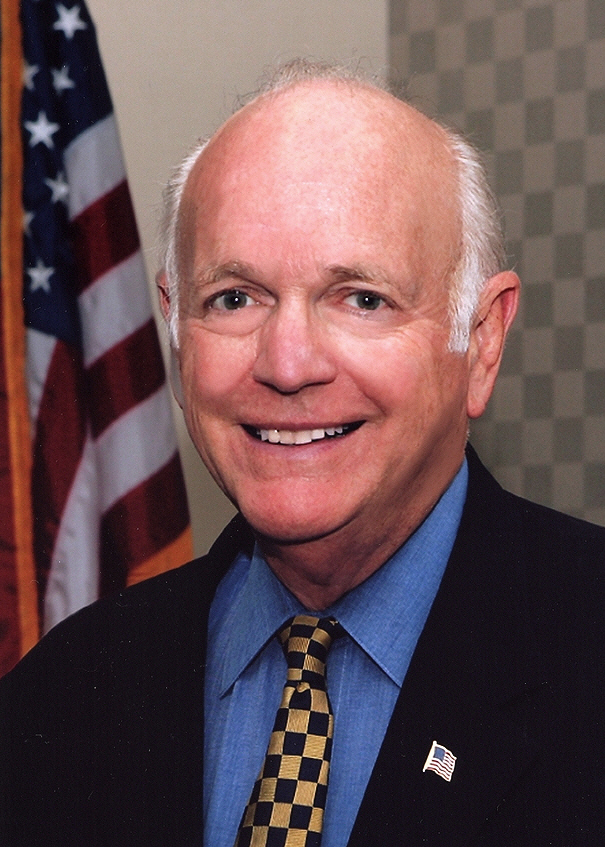

Nominee	Dennis DeConcini	Keith DeGreen
Party	Democratic	Republican
Popular vote	660,403	478,060
Percentage	56.7%	41.1%
- County results DeConcini: 40–50% 50–60% 60–70% 70–80%
U.S. senator before election
Dennis DeConcini
Democratic
Elected U.S. Senator
Dennis DeConcini
Democratic

Incumbent Democrat Dennis DeConcini was reelected to a third term over Republican Keith DeGreen, Marine veteran and financial advisor.

General election results
Party	Candidate	Votes	%	±%
Democratic	Dennis DeConcini (incumbent)	660,403	56.71%	−0.20%
Republican	Keith DeGreen	478,060	41.05%	+0.75%
Libertarian	Rick Tompkins	20,849	1.79%	−0.99%
New Alliance	Ed Finkelstein	5,195	0.45%	
Write-ins		32	0.00%	
Majority		182,343	15.66%	−0.95%
Turnout		1,164,539		
Democratic hold		Swing		

== California ==
California election
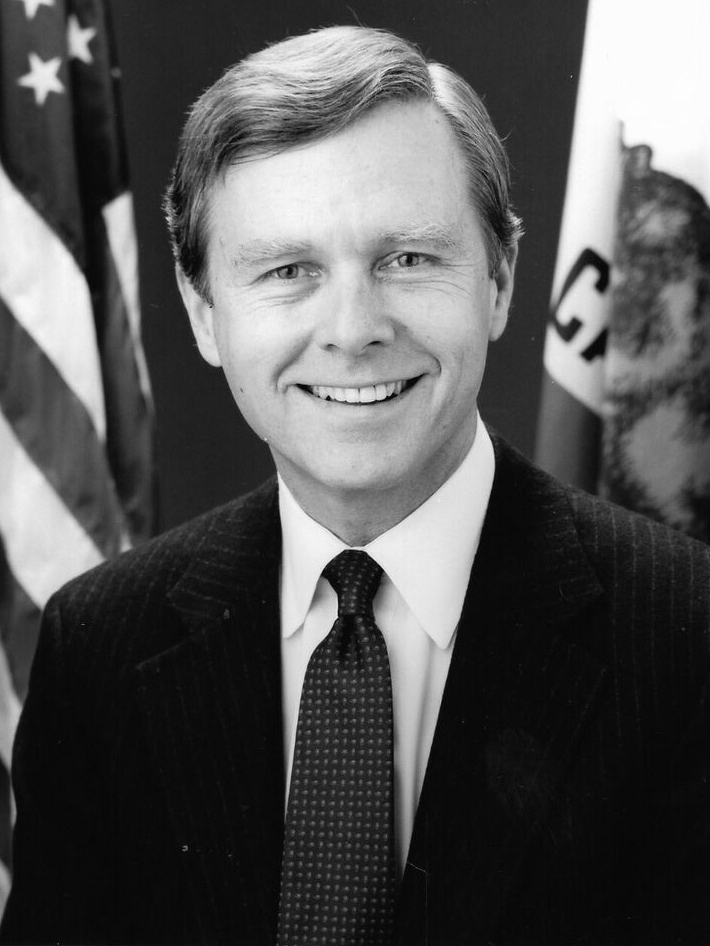

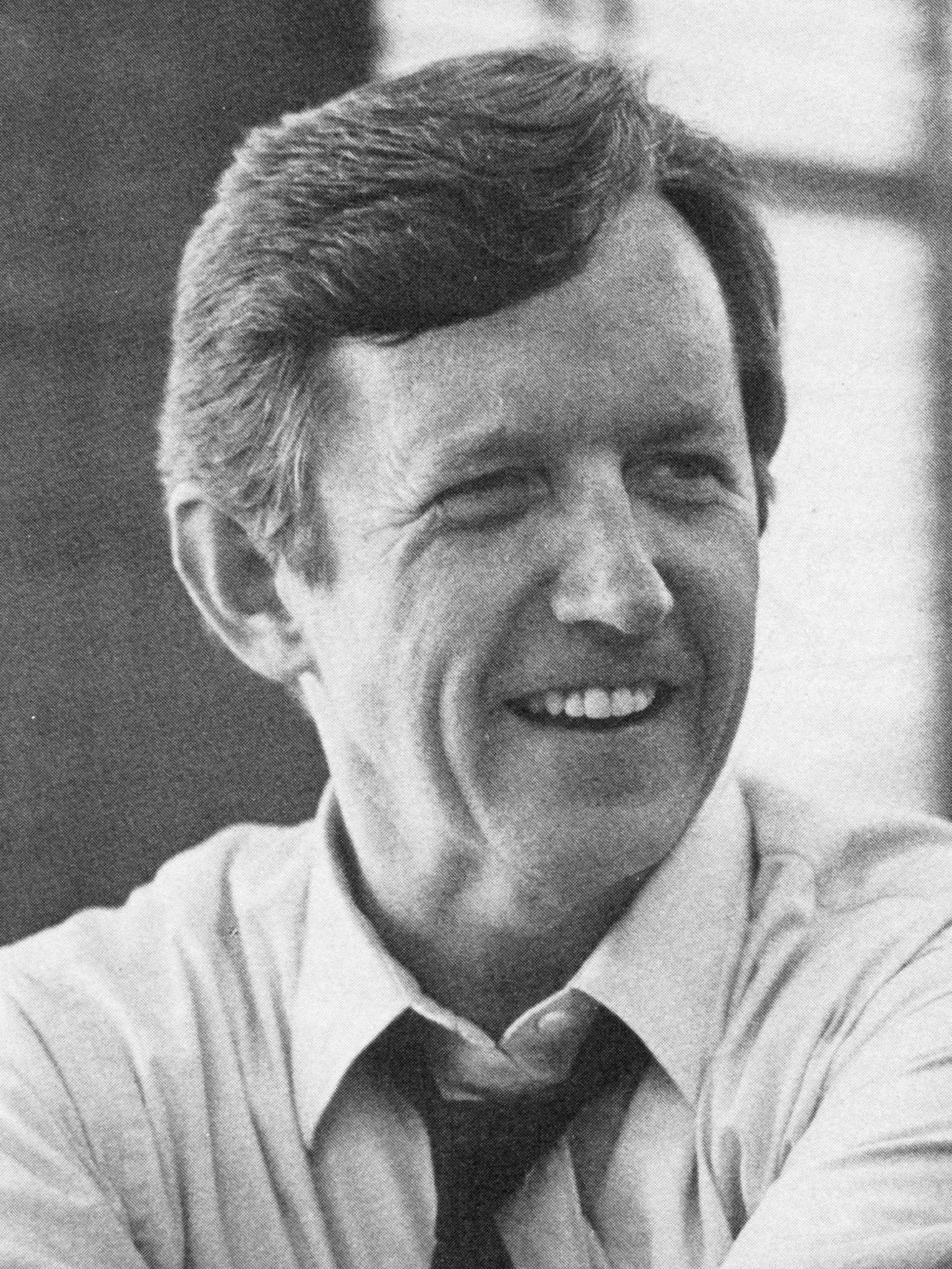
Nominee	Pete Wilson	Leo T. McCarthy
Party	Republican	Democratic
Popular vote	5,143,409	4,287,253
Percentage	52.8%	44.0%
- County results Wilson: 40–50% 50–60% 60–70% McCarthy: 40–50% 50–60% 60–70%
U.S. senator before election
Pete Wilson
Republican
Elected U.S. Senator
Pete Wilson
Republican

Incumbent Republican Pete Wilson won re-election to a second term over Democrat Leo T. McCarthy, lieutenant governor of California and former Speaker of the California State Assembly. As of 2020, this is the last Senate election in California won by a Republican.

General election results
Party	Candidate	Votes	%
Republican	Pete Wilson (incumbent)	5,143,409	52.8%
Democratic	Leo T. McCarthy	4,287,253	44.0%
Peace and Freedom	Maria Elizabeth Munoz	166,600	1.7%
Libertarian	Jack Dean	79,997	0.8%
American Independent	Merton D. Short	66,291	0.7%
Total votes		9,743,550	100.00%
Majority		856,156	8.8%
Republican hold			

== Connecticut ==
Connecticut election
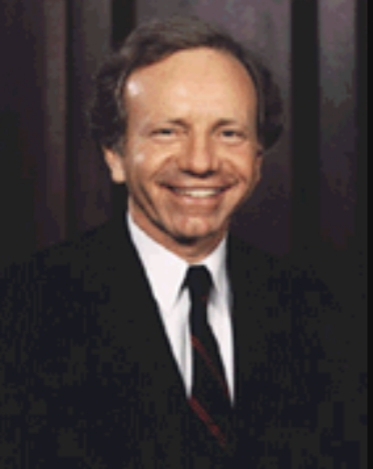

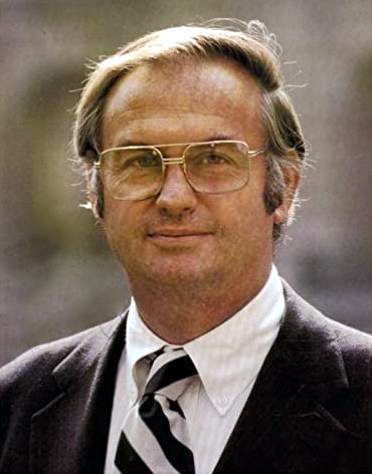
Nominee	Joe Lieberman	Lowell Weicker
Party	Democratic	Republican
Popular vote	688,499	677,903
Percentage	49.8%	49.0%
- Lieberman: 40–50% 50–60% 60–70% Weicker: 40–50% 50–60% 60–70% Tie: 40–50%
U.S. senator before election
Lowell P. Weicker Jr.
Republican
Elected U.S. Senator
Joe Lieberman
Democratic

Incumbent Republican Lowell P. Weicker Jr. ran for re-election to a fourth term, but was defeated by Democratic candidate Joe Lieberman, the Connecticut attorney general and eventual 2000 nominee for vice president of the United States, who would remain in office until his retirement in 2013.

General election results
Party	Candidate	Votes	%
Democratic	Joseph Lieberman	688,499	49.8%
Republican	Lowell Weicker (incumbent)	677,903	49.0%
Libertarian	Howard A. Grayson Jr.	12,409	0.9%
New Alliance	Melissa M. Fisher	4,154	0.3%
Total votes		1,379,362	100.0%
Majority		10,596	0.8%
Democratic gain from Republican			

== Delaware ==
Delaware election
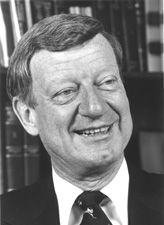

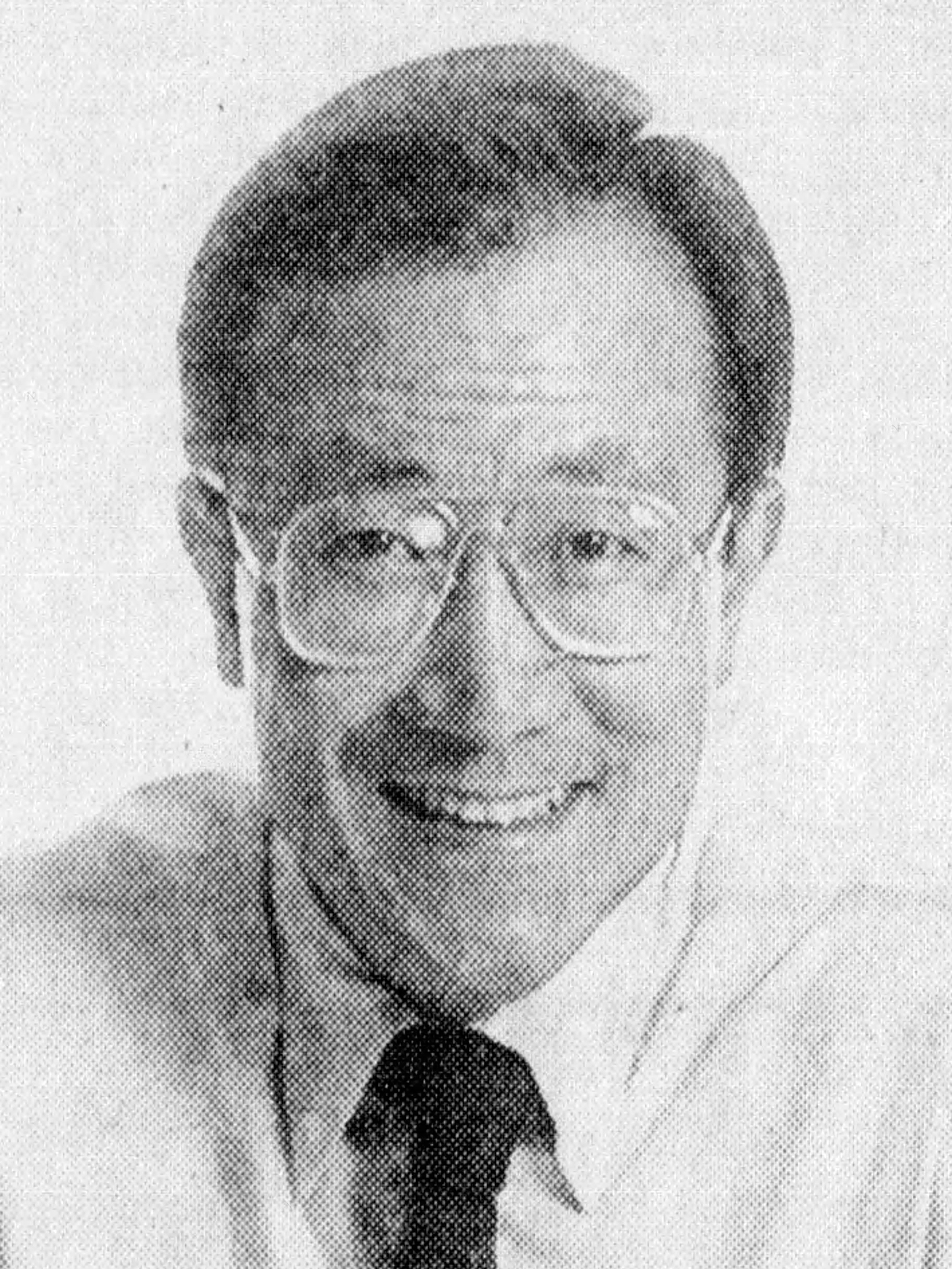
Nominee	William Roth	Shien Biau Woo
Party	Republican	Democratic
Popular vote	151,115	92,378
Percentage	62.1%	37.9%
- County results Roth: 50–60% 60–70%
U.S. senator before election
William V. Roth
Republican
Elected U.S. Senator
William V. Roth
Republican

Incumbent Republican William Roth won re-election to a fourth term, beating Democrat Shien Biau Woo, lieutenant governor of Delaware.

Democratic Party primary results
Party	Candidate	Votes	%
Democratic	S. B. Woo	20,225	50.09
Democratic	Samuel Beard	20,154	49.91
Total votes		40,379	100.00

General election results
Party	Candidate	Votes	%	±%
Republican	William V. Roth (incumbent)	151,115	62.06%	+6.89%
Democratic	S.B. Woo	92,378	37.94%	−6.27%
Majority		58,737	24.12%	+13.15%
Turnout		243,493		
Republican hold		Swing		

== Florida ==
Florida election
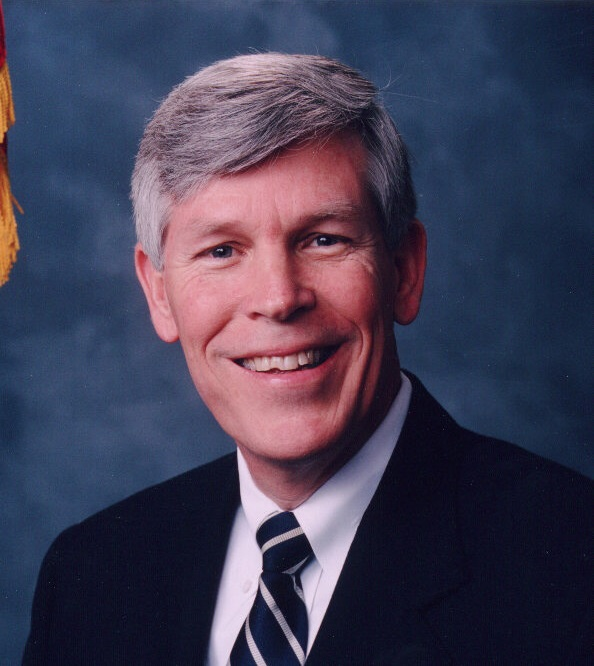

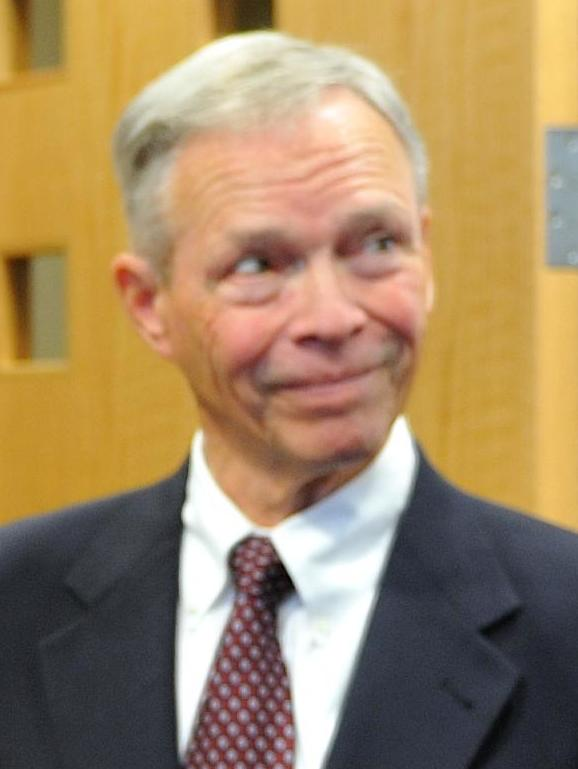
Nominee	Connie Mack III	Buddy MacKay
Party	Republican	Democratic
Popular vote	2,051,071	2,016,553
Percentage	50.4%	49.6%
- County results Mack: 50–60% 60–70% 70–80% MacKay: 50–60% 60–70%
U.S. senator before election
Lawton Chiles
Democratic
Elected U.S. Senator
Connie Mack III
Republican

Incumbent Democrat Lawton Chiles decided to retire instead of seeking a fourth term. Republican U.S. Representative Connie Mack III won the open seat over Democratic Congressman Buddy Mackay.

This senate election was heavily targeted by both parties. U.S. Representative Mack had announced his candidacy in October 1987. President Ronald Reagan endorsed Mack in June 1988 to allow Mack to focus on the general election, and easily won the September 6 Republican primary against U.S. Attorney Robert Merkle. In May 1988, then-Congressman MacKay announced he would run for the open seat, and defeated Insurance Commissioner Bill Gunter in a close October 4 runoff election.

The general election soon became nasty, with Mackay portraying Mack as "extremist." Mack also attacked his opponent in television ads by connecting him to liberal Massachusetts governor and Democratic presidential nominee Michael Dukakis. Mack had help from vice presidential candidate Dan Quayle. The election was so close that there was a recount until Mackay conceded eight days after election day.

Democratic primary results
Party	Candidate	Votes	%
Democratic	Bill Gunter	383,721	38.00
Democratic	Buddy MacKay	263,946	26.14
Democratic	Dan Mica	179,524	17.78
Democratic	Pat Frank	119,277	11.81
Democratic	Claude R. Kirk Jr.	51,387	5.09
Democratic	Fred Rader	11,820	1.17
Total votes		1,009,675	100

Democratic primary runoff results
Party	Candidate	Votes	%
Democratic	Buddy MacKay	369,266	52.00
Democratic	Bill Gunter	340,918	48.00
Total votes		710,184	100

Republican primary results
Party	Candidate	Votes	%
Republican	Connie Mack III	405,296	61.78
Republican	Robert Merkle	250,730	38.22
Total votes		656,026	100

General election results
Party	Candidate	Votes	%	±%
Republican	Connie Mack III	2,051,071	50.42%	+12.15%
Democratic	Buddy MacKay	2,016,553	49.57%	−12.15%
Write-ins		585	0.01%	
Majority		34,518	0.85%	−22.61%
Total votes		4,068,209	100.00%	
Republican gain from Democratic		Swing		

== Hawaii ==
Hawaii election
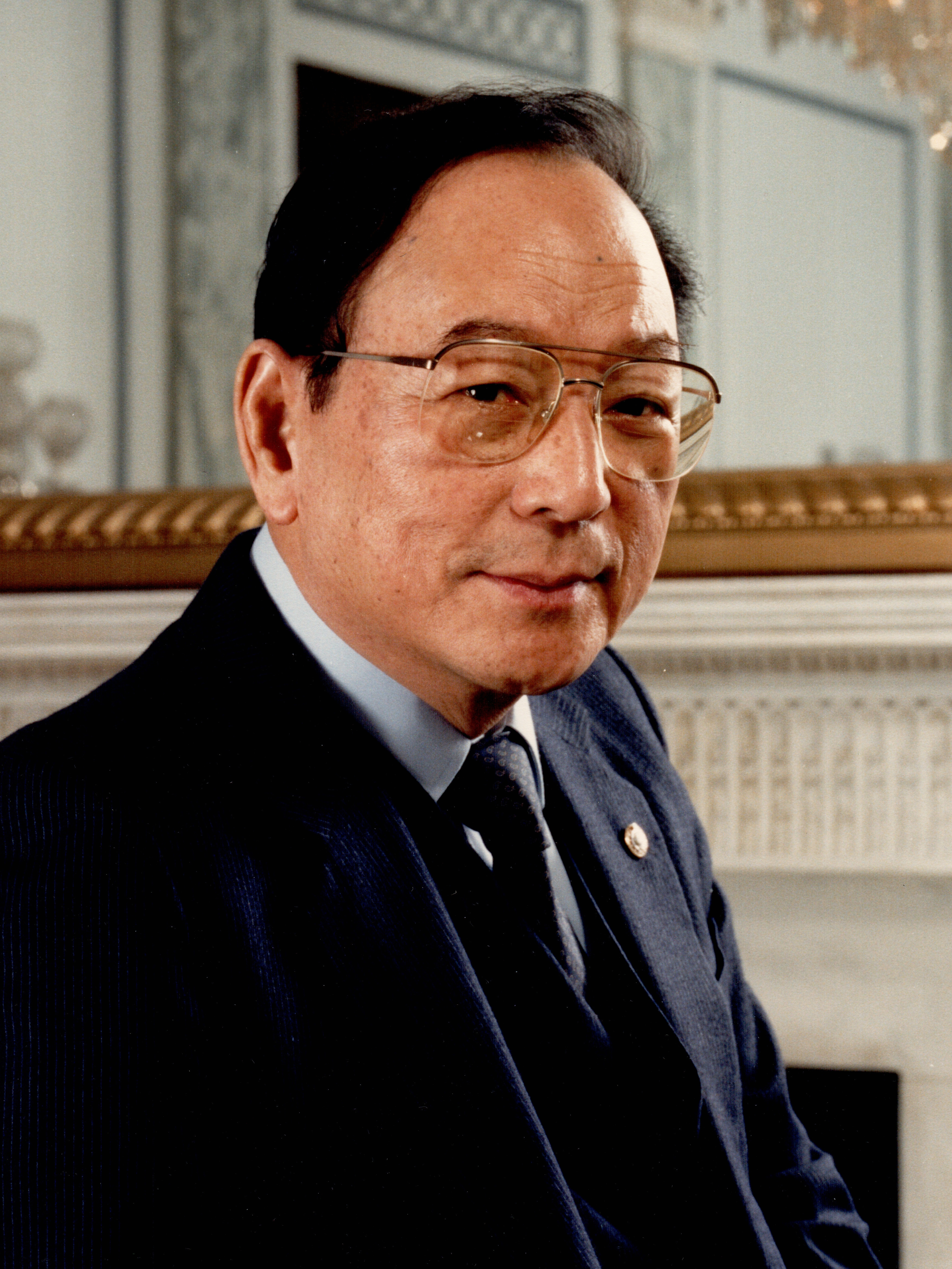

Nominee	Spark Matsunaga	Maria Hustace
Party	Democratic	Republican
Popular vote	247,941	66,987
Percentage	76.6%	20.7%
- County results Matsunaga: 70–80% 80–90%
U.S. senator before election
Spark Matsunaga
Democratic
Elected U.S. Senator
Spark Matsunaga
Democratic

Incumbent Democrat Spark Matsunaga won re-election to a third term, beating Republican cattle rancher Maria Hustace.

General election results
Party	Candidate	Votes	%
Democratic	Spark Matsunaga (incumbent)	247,941	76.6%
Republican	Maria Hustace	66,987	20.7%
Libertarian	Ken Schoolland	8,948	2.8%
Total votes		323,876	100.00%
Majority		180,954	55.9%
Democratic hold			

== Indiana ==
Indiana election
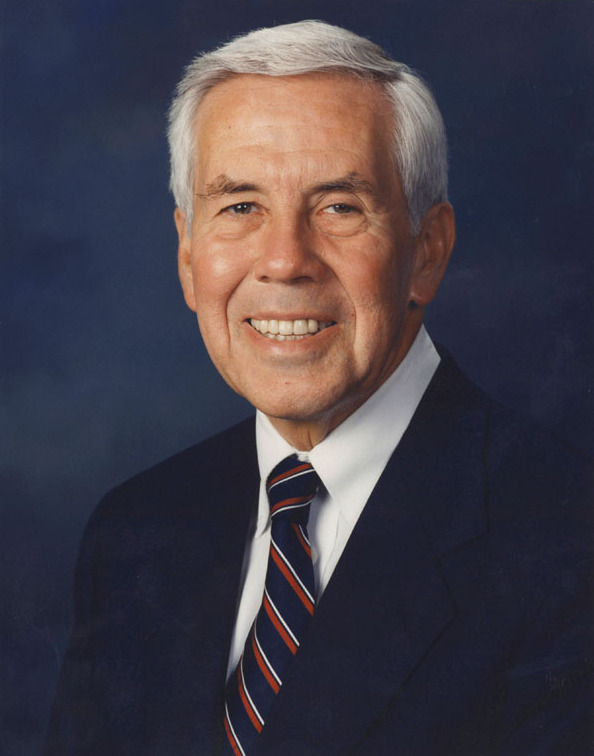

Nominee	Richard Lugar	Jack Wickes
Party	Republican	Democratic
Popular vote	1,430,525	668,778
Percentage	68.1%	31.9%
- County results Lugar: 50-60% 60-70% 70-80% 80-90% Wickes: 50–60%
U.S. senator before election
Richard Lugar
Republican
Elected U.S. Senator
Richard Lugar
Republican

Incumbent Republican Richard Lugar was re-elected to a third term over Democratic attorney Jack Wickes.

Lugar, a popular incumbent, had token opposition in this election. An April 1988 poll showed that Lugar lead 65% to 23%. By June, Lugar raised over $2 million, while Wickes raised just over $100,000. Lugar agreed to debate Wickes on September 10, 1988.

Lugar won overall with two-thirds of the vote and won 91 of Indiana's 92 counties, Wickes won only the Democratic stronghold of Lake County.

General election results
Party	Candidate	Votes	%
Republican	Richard Lugar (incumbent)	1,430,525	68.1%
Democratic	Jack Wickes	668,778	31.9%
Total votes		2,099,303	100.00%
Majority		761,747	36.2%
Republican hold			

== Maine ==
Maine election
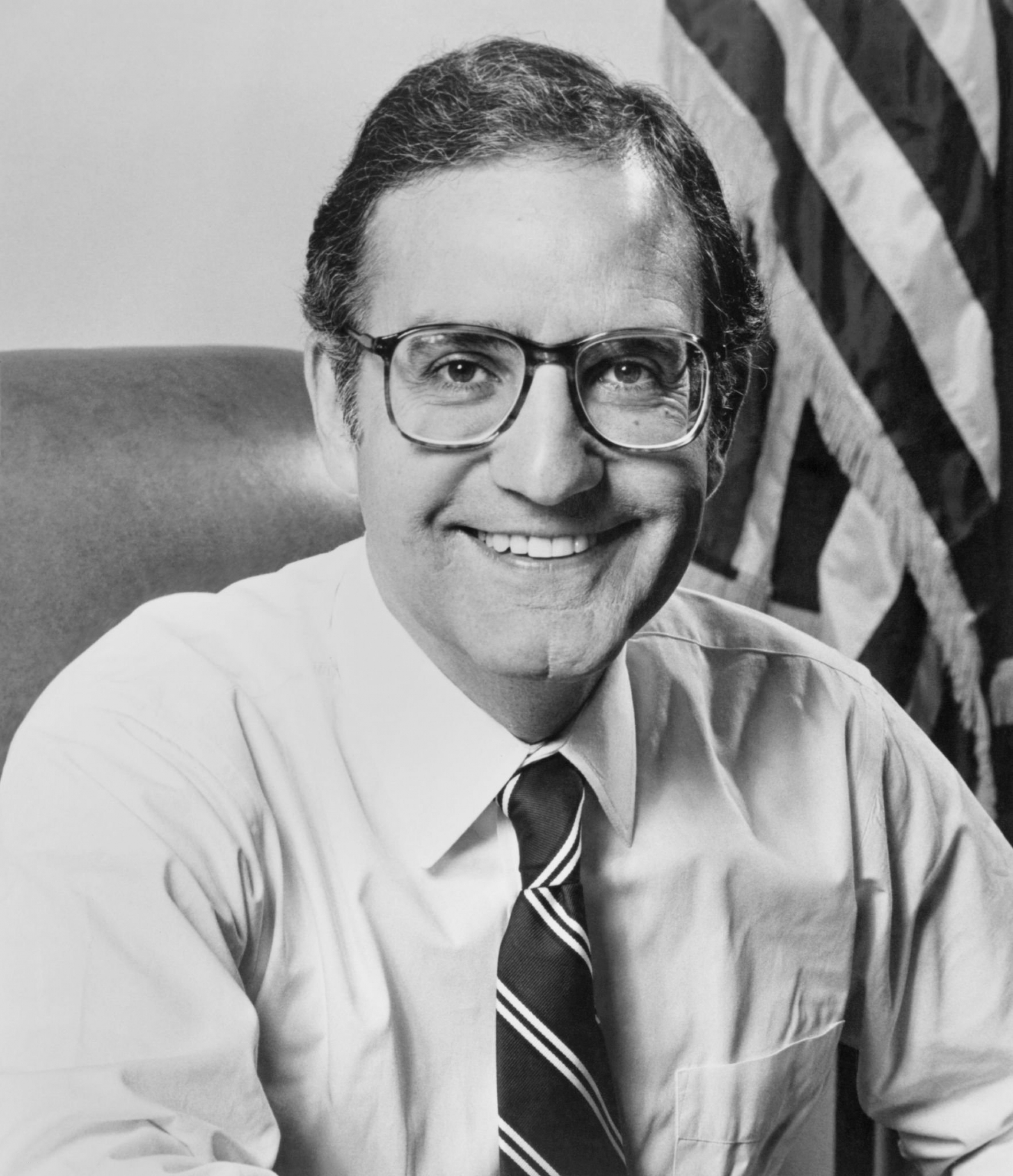

Nominee	George Mitchell	Jasper Wyman
Party	Democratic	Republican
Popular vote	452,581	104,164
Percentage	81.3%	18.7%
- County results Mitchell: 70–80% 80–90%
U.S. senator before election
George J. Mitchell
Democratic
Elected U.S. Senator
George J. Mitchell
Democratic

Incumbent Democrat George J. Mitchell won re-election to a second full term over Republican Jasper Wyman, leader of Maine Christian Civic League and businessman. As of 2020, this is the last Senate election in Maine won by a Democrat.

General election results
Party	Candidate	Votes	%
Democratic	George Mitchell (incumbent)	452,581	81.3%
Republican	Jasper Wyman	104,164	18.7%
Total votes		556,745	100.00%
Majority		348,417	62.6%
Democratic hold			

== Maryland ==
Maryland election
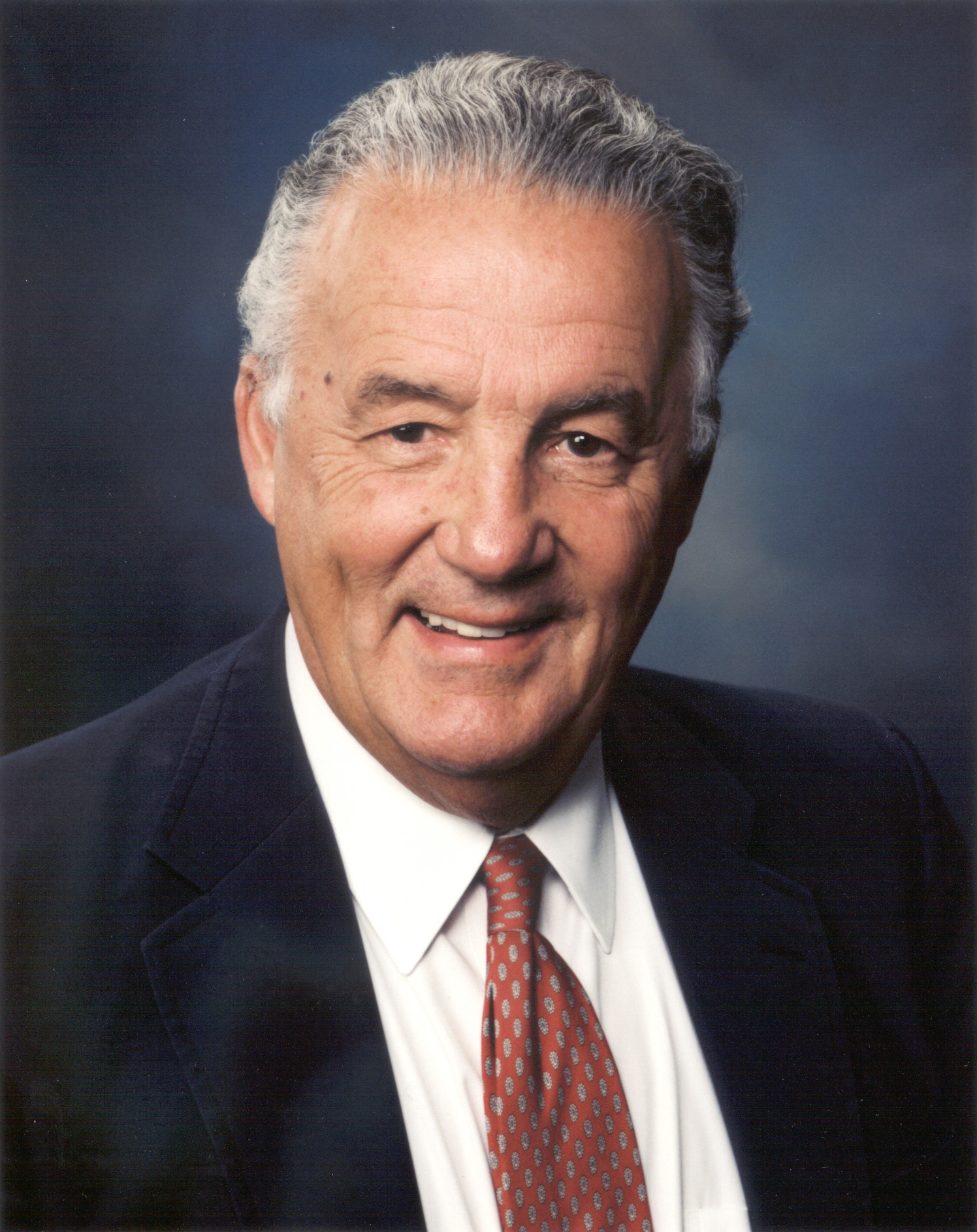

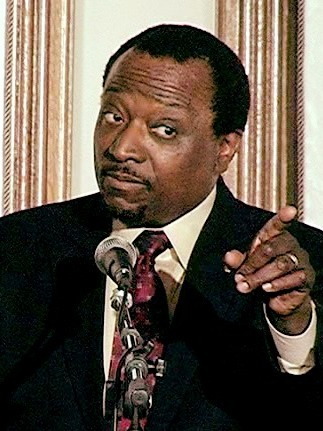
Nominee	Paul Sarbanes	Alan Keyes
Party	Democratic	Republican
Popular vote	999,166	617,537
Percentage	61.8%	38.2%
- County results Sarbanes: 50–60% 60–70% 70–80% Keyes: 50–60%
U.S. senator before election
Paul S. Sarbanes
Democratic
Elected U.S. Senator
Paul S. Sarbanes
Democratic

Incumbent Democratic Paul Sarbanes was reelected to a third term over Republican Alan Keyes, former Assistant Secretary of State for International Organization Affairs.

General election results
Party	Candidate	Votes	%
Democratic	Paul Sarbanes (incumbent)	999,166	61.8
Republican	Alan Keyes	617,537	38.2
Independent	Imad A. Ahmad (write-in)	349	0.0
Independent	Rashaad Ali (write-in)	13	0.0
Majority		381,629	23.6
Turnout		1,617,065	
Democratic hold			

== Massachusetts ==
Massachusetts election
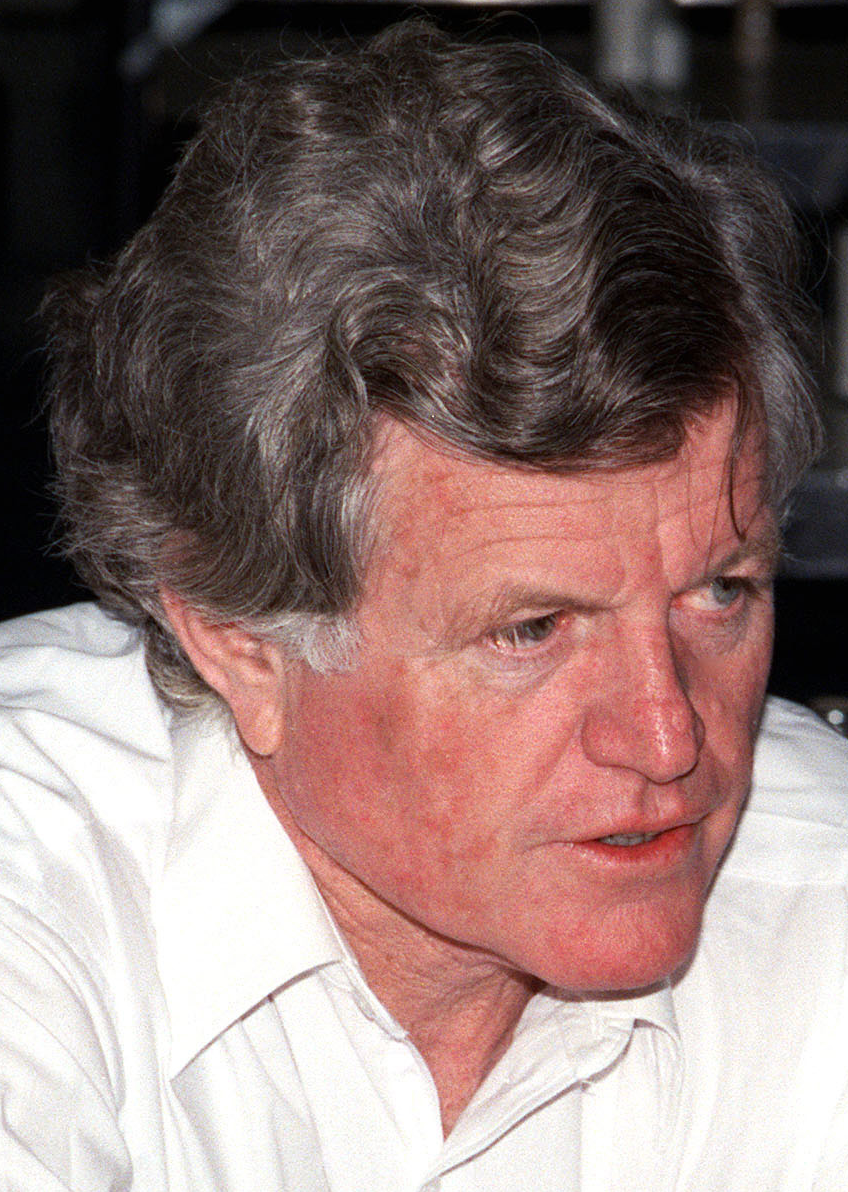

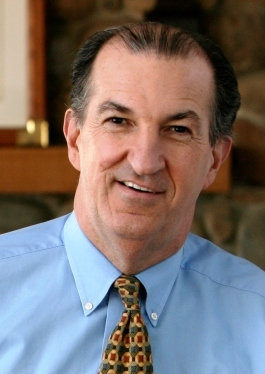
Nominee	Ted Kennedy	Joseph D. Malone
Party	Democratic	Republican
Popular vote	1,693,344	884,267
Percentage	65.0%	33.9%
- County results Kennedy: 50–60% 60–70% 70–80% 80–90% 90–100% Malone: 40–50% 50–60% Tie: 40–50%
U.S. senator before election
Ted Kennedy
Democratic
Elected U.S. Senator
Ted Kennedy
Democratic

Incumbent Democrat Ted Kennedy won re-election to his sixth (his fifth full) term over Republican Joseph D. Malone.

General election results
Party	Candidate	Votes	%	±%
Democratic	Ted Kennedy (incumbent)	1,693,344	64.97	+4.16
Republican	Joseph D. Malone	884,267	33.93	−4.33
New Alliance	Mary Fridley	15,208	0.58	+0.58
Libertarian	Freda Lee Nason	13,199	0.51	−0.41
	All others	207	0.01	+0
Total votes		2,606,225	87.77%	
Democratic hold		Swing		

== Michigan ==
Michigan election
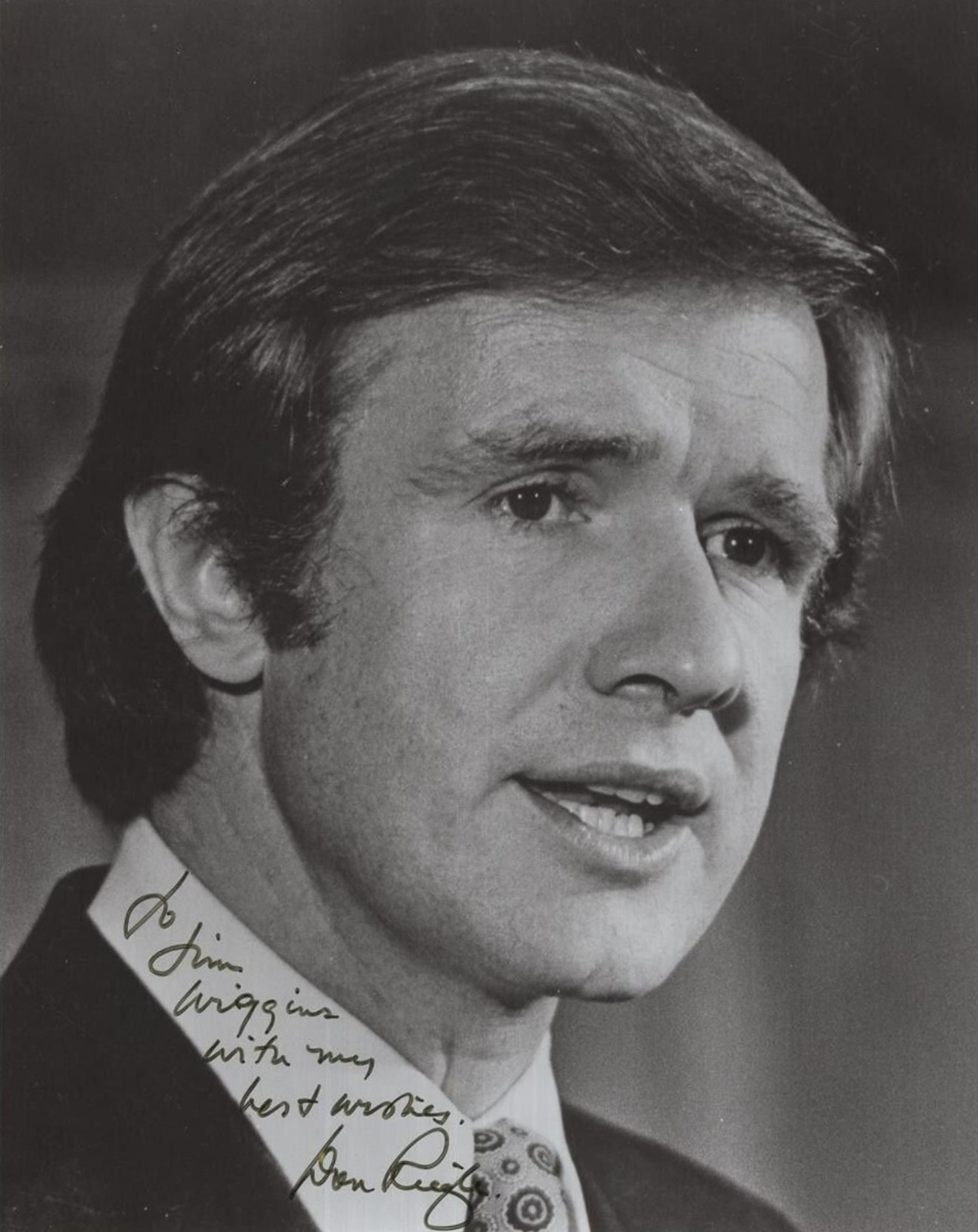

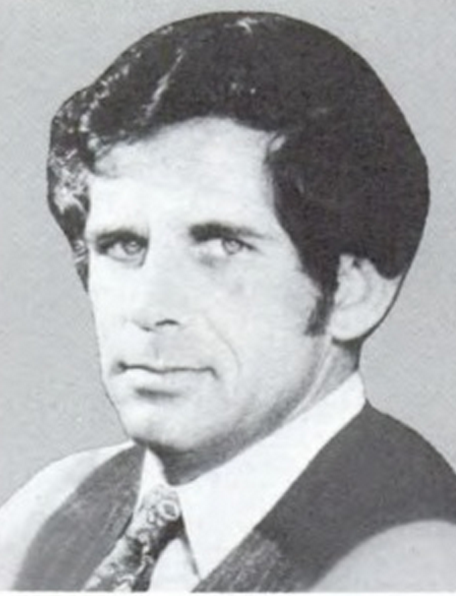
Nominee	Don Riegle	James Whitney Dunn
Party	Democratic	Republican
Popular vote	2,116,865	1,348,216
Percentage	60.4%	38.5%
- County results Riegle: 50–60% 60–70% 70–80% Dunn: 40–50% 50–60% 60–70%
U.S. senator before election
Don Riegle
Democratic
Elected U.S. Senator
Don Riegle
Democratic

Incumbent Democrat Don Riegle won re-election to a third term over Republican U.S. Congressman James Whitney Dunn.

General election results
Party	Candidate	Votes	%
Democratic	Donald Riegle (incumbent)	2,116,865	60.4
Republican	Jim Dunn	1,348,216	38.5
Libertarian	Dick Jacobs	27,116	0.8
Workers Against Concessions	Sally Bier	8,908	0.3
Independent	Mark Friedman	4,821	0.1
Total votes		3,505,926	100.00%
Majority		768,649	21.9%
Democratic hold			

== Minnesota ==
Minnesota election

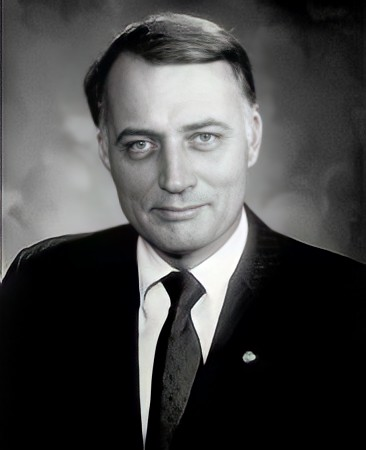

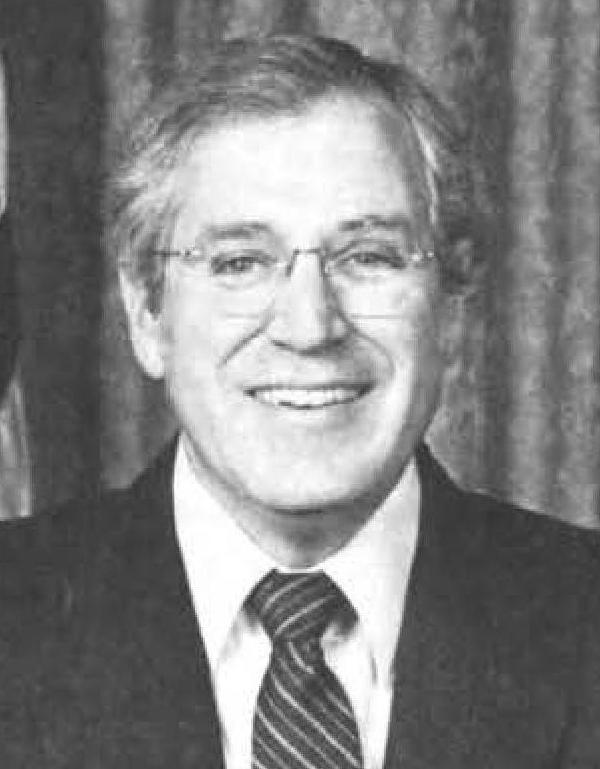
Nominee	David Durenberger	Skip Humphrey
Party	Ind.-Republican	Democratic (DFL)
Popular vote	1,176,210	856,694
Percentage	56.2%	40.9%
- County results Durenberger: 50–60% 60–70% Humphrey: 50–60%
U.S. senator before election
David Durenberger
Ind.-Republican
Elected U.S. Senator
David Durenberger
Ind.-Republican

Incumbent Republican David Durenberger won re-election to his second full term, beating Democrat Skip Humphrey, the Minnesota attorney general and former state senator.

General election results
Party	Candidate	Votes	%
Republican	David Durenberger (incumbent)	1,176,210	56.2
Democratic	Skip Humphrey	856,694	40.9
Minnesota Progressive Party	Polly Mann	44,474	2.1
Grassroots	Derrick Grimmer	9,016	0.4
Libertarian	Arlen Overvig	4,039	0.2
Socialist Workers	Wendy Lyons	3,105	0.2
Total votes		2,093,538	100.00%
Majority		319,516	15.3
Republican hold			

== Mississippi ==
Mississippi election
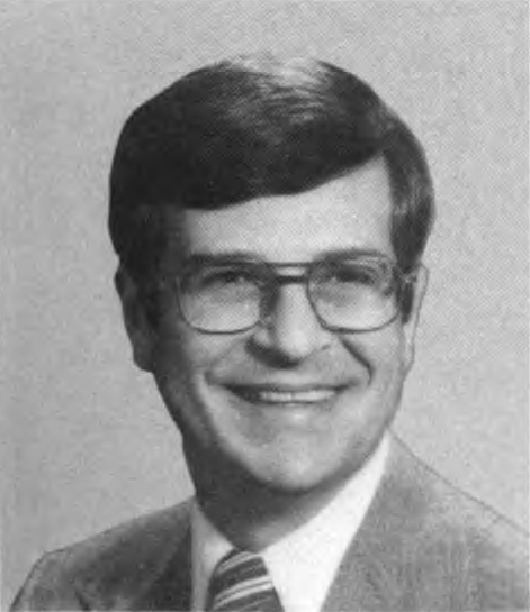

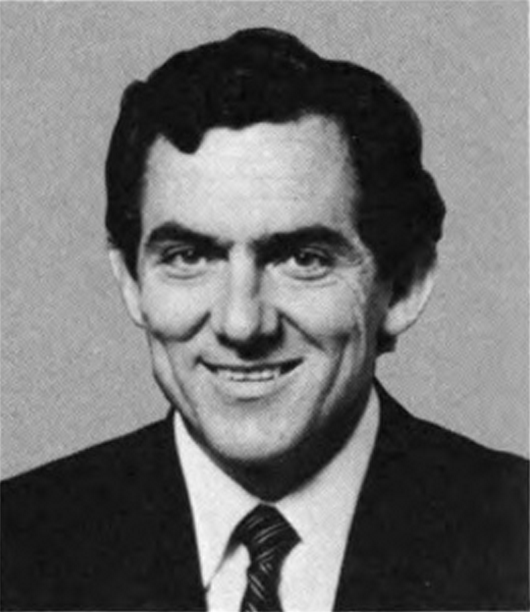
Nominee	Trent Lott	Wayne Dowdy
Party	Republican	Democratic
Popular vote	510,380	436,339
Percentage	53.9%	46.1%
- County results Lott: 50–60% 60–70% 70–80% Dowdy: 50–60% 60–70% 70–80% 80–90%
U.S. senator before election
John C. Stennis
Democratic
Elected U.S. Senator
Trent Lott
Republican

Incumbent Democrat John C. Stennis decided to retire instead of seeking an eighth term (and his seventh full term). Republican Trent Lott won the open seat, beating Democrat Wayne Dowdy, U.S. congressman from the 4th district.

General election results
Party	Candidate	Votes	%
Republican	Trent Lott	510,380	53.9
Democratic	Wayne Dowdy	436,339	46.1
Total votes		946,719	100.00%
Majority		74,041	7.8
Republican gain from Democratic			

== Missouri ==
Missouri election
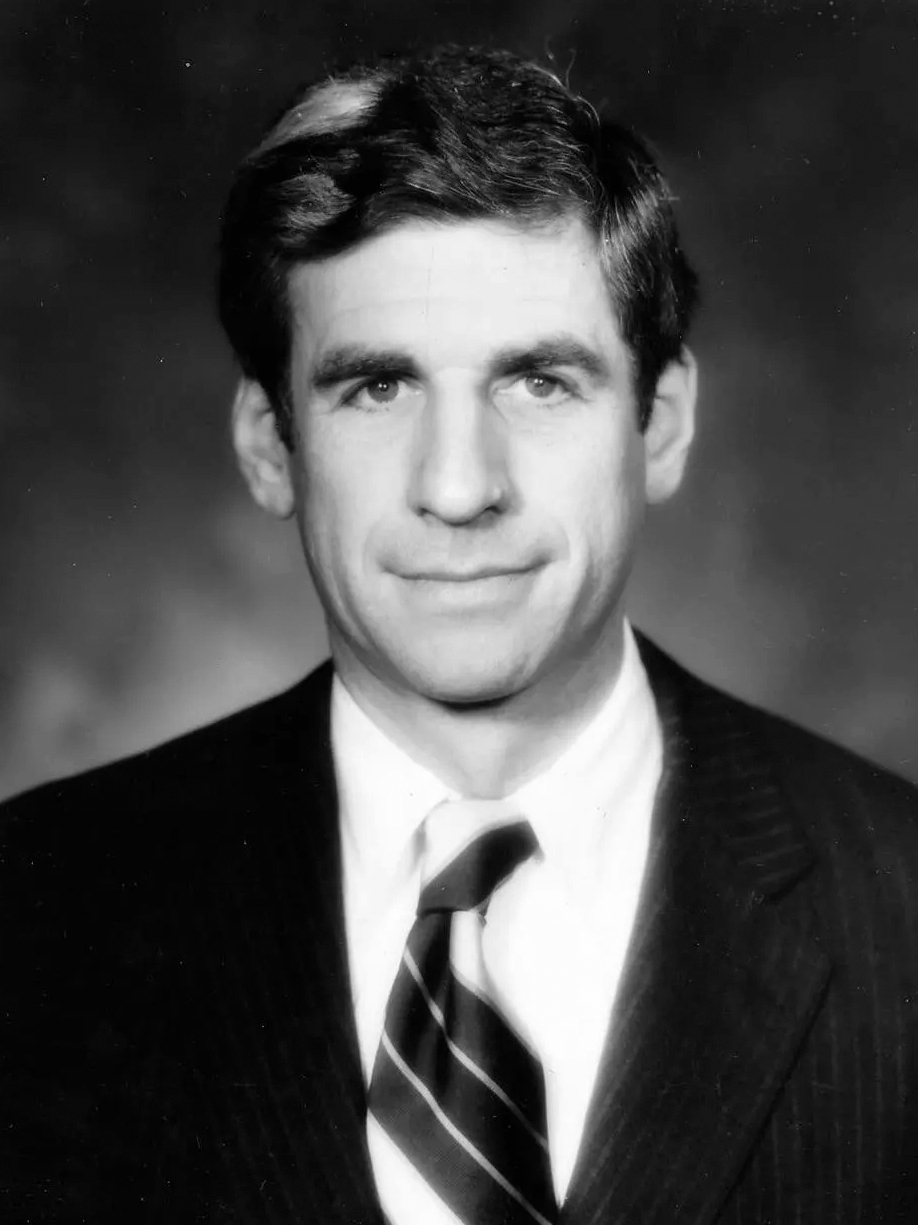

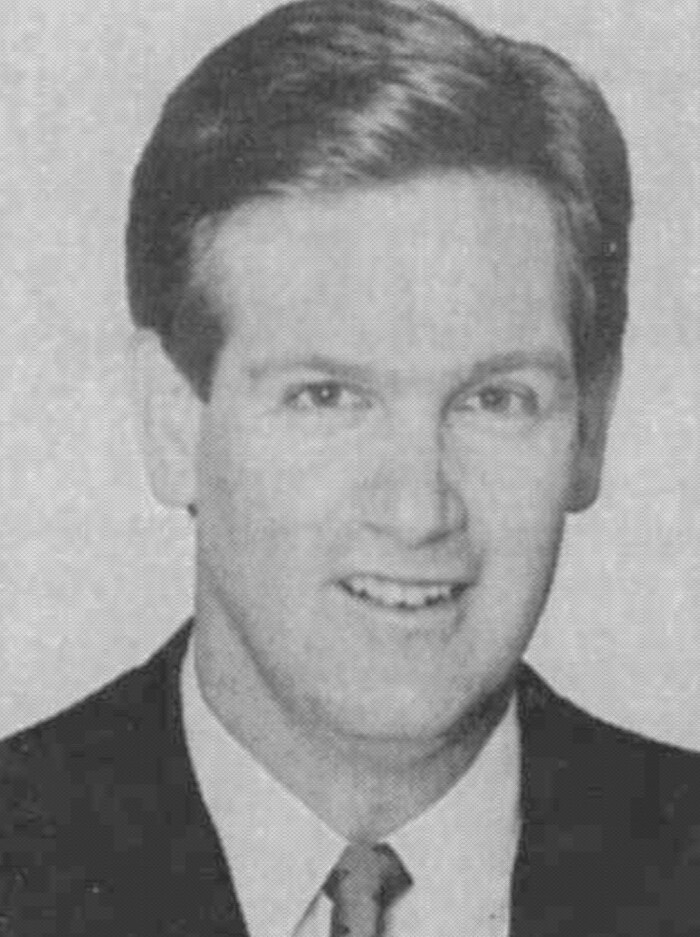
Nominee	John Danforth	Jay Nixon
Party	Republican	Democratic
Popular vote	1,407,416	660,045
Percentage	67.7%	31.8%
- County results Danforth: 50-60% 60-70% 70-80% 80-90% Nixon: 50–60%
U.S. senator before election
John Danforth
Republican
Elected U.S. Senator
John Danforth
Republican

Incumbent Republican John Danforth won re-election over Democratic state senator and future governor Jay Nixon.

1988 Missouri United States Senate election
Party	Candidate	Votes	%
Republican	John Danforth (incumbent)	1,407,416	67.70
Democratic	Jay Nixon	660,045	31.75
Libertarian	John Guze	11,410	0.55
	Write-ins	4	0.00
Majority		747,371	35.95
Turnout		2,078,875	
Republican hold			

== Montana ==
Montana election
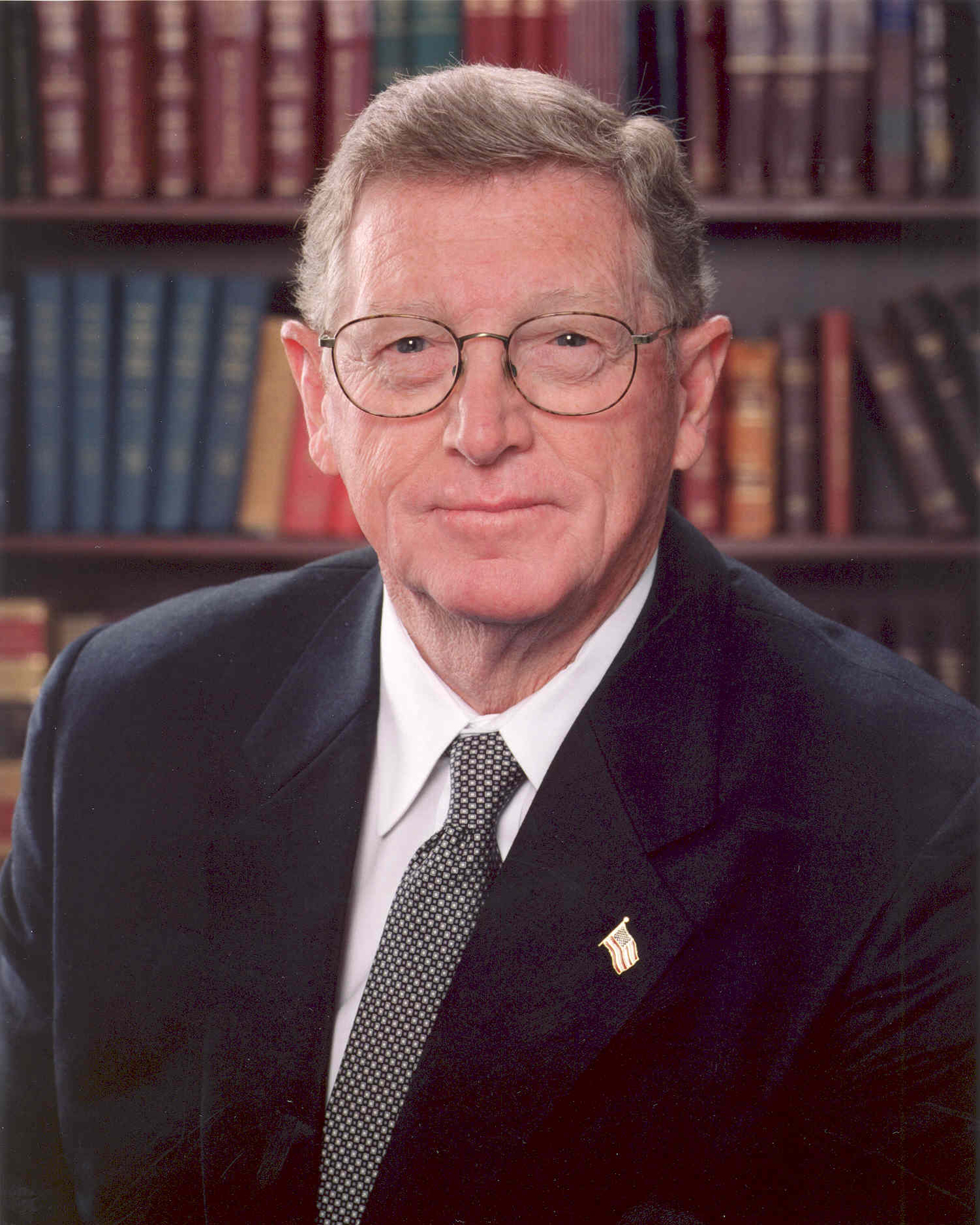

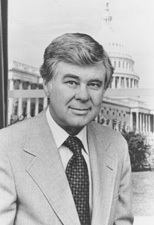
Nominee	Conrad Burns	John Melcher
Party	Republican	Democratic
Popular vote	189,445	175,809
Percentage	51.9%	48.1%
- County results Burns: 50–60% 60–70% 70–80% Melcher: 50–60% 60–70%
U.S. senator before election
John Melcher
Democratic
Elected U.S. Senator
Conrad Burns
Republican

Incumbent John Melcher, who was first elected to the Senate in 1976 and was re-elected in 1982, ran for re-election. After winning the Democratic primary, he faced Yellowstone County Commissioner Conrad Burns in the general election, and in the general election a grueling campaign followed. Ultimately, Melcher was narrowly defeated in his bid for re-election by Burns.

Democratic Party primary results
Party	Candidate	Votes	%
Democratic	Jack Melcher (incumbent)	88,457	74.54
Democratic	Bob Kelleher	30,212	25.46
Total votes		118,669	100.00

Republican primary results
Party	Candidate	Votes	%
Republican	Conrad Burns	63,330	84.71
Republican	Tom Faranda	11,427	15.29
Total votes		74,757	100.00

1988 United States Senate election in Montana
Party	Candidate	Votes	%	±%
Republican	Conrad Burns	189,445	51.87%	+10.20%
Democratic	John Melcher (incumbent)	175,809	48.13%	−6.33%
Majority		13,636	3.73%	−9.06%
Turnout		365,254		
Republican gain from Democratic		Swing		

== Nebraska ==
Nebraska election
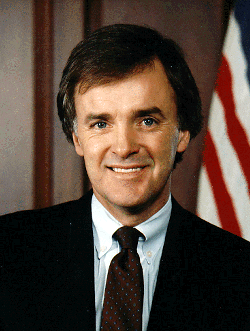

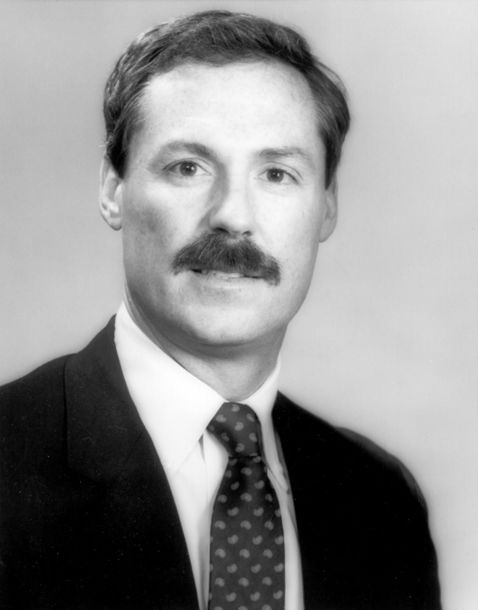
Nominee	Bob Kerrey	David Karnes
Party	Democratic	Republican
Popular vote	378,717	278,250
Percentage	56.71%	41.66%
- County results Kerrey: 40–50% 50–60% 60–70% 70–80% Karnes: 40–50% 50–60% 60–70% 70–80% Tie: 40–50%
U.S. senator before election
David Karnes
Republican
Elected U.S. Senator
Bob Kerrey
Democratic

Republican David Karnes decided to seek election to his first complete term after being appointed to the seat of the late Edward Zorinsky in March 1987, but was soundly defeated by Democratic former governor Bob Kerrey in the November general election.

Republican primary results
Party	Candidate	Votes	%
Republican	David Karnes	117,439	55
Republican	Hal Daub	96,436	45

1988 Nebraska United States Senate election
Party	Candidate	Votes	%
Democratic	Bob Kerrey	378,717	56.71
Republican	David Karnes (incumbent)	278,250	41.66
New Alliance	Ernie Chambers	10,372	1.55
	Write-ins	521	0.08
Majority		100,467	15.04
Turnout		667,860	
Democratic gain from Republican			

== Nevada ==
Nevada election
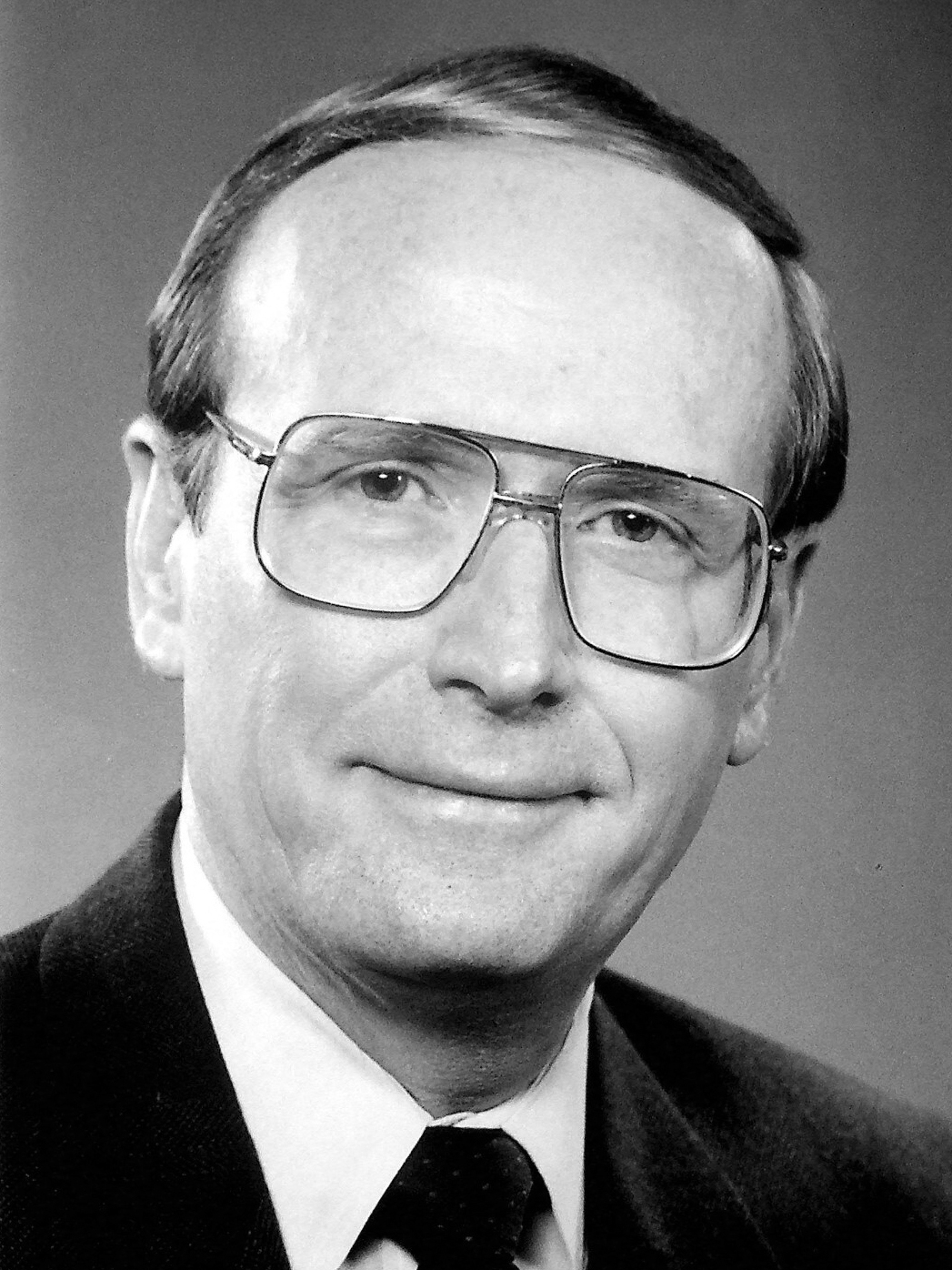

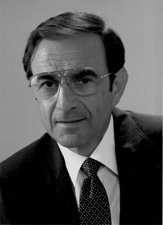
Nominee	Richard Bryan	Chic Hecht
Party	Democratic	Republican
Popular vote	175,548	161,336
Percentage	50.2%	46.1%
- County results Bryan: 40–50% 50–60% Hecht: 50–60% 60–70% 70–80%
U.S. senator before election
Chic Hecht
Republican
Elected U.S. Senator
Richard Bryan
Democratic

Incumbent Republican Chic Hecht ran for re-election to a second term, but lost to Democratic governor Richard Bryan.

General election results
Party	Candidate	Votes	%
Democratic	Richard Bryan	175,548	50.21%
Republican	Chic Hecht (incumbent)	161,336	46.14%
None	None of These Candidates	7,242	2.07%
Libertarian	James Frye	5,523	1.58%
Majority		14,212	4.06%
Turnout		349,649	
Democratic gain from Republican			

== New Jersey ==
New Jersey election
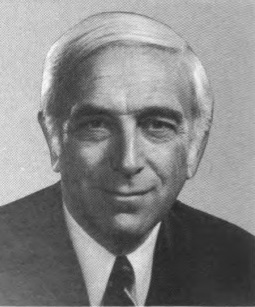

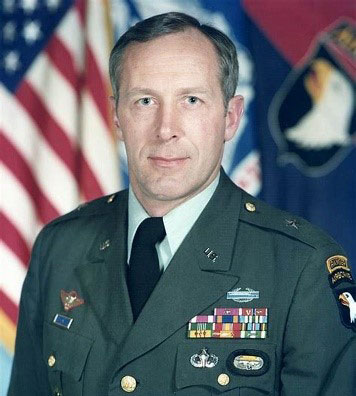
Nominee	Frank Lautenberg	Pete Dawkins
Party	Democratic	Republican
Popular vote	1,599,905	1,349,937
Percentage	53.55%	45.18%
- Lautenberg: 50–60% 60–70% Dawkins: 40–50% 50–60% 60–70%
U.S. senator before election
Frank Lautenberg
Democratic
Elected U.S. Senator
Frank Lautenberg
Democratic

Incumbent Democrat Frank Lautenberg won re-election to a second term with a margin of 8.37% over Republican Pete Dawkins, military veteran and CEO of Primerica Financial Services, Inc.

The campaign was full of political mudslinging, with Lautenberg accusing Dawkins of being a carpetbagger, noting his very brief residency in the state, and accusing Dawkins' campaign of lying about his war record. Dawkins accused Lautenberg of running a smear campaign, called him a "swamp dog", and criticized him for saying he voted eight times against a senatorial pay raise without mentioning the fact that he did vote once for the pay raise.

1988 United States Senate election in New Jersey
Party	Candidate	Votes	%
Democratic	Frank Lautenberg (incumbent)	1,599,905	53.55%
Republican	Pete Dawkins	1,349,937	45.18%
Independent	Joseph F. Job	20,091	0.67%
Libertarian	Jerry Zeldin	12,354	0.41%
Socialist	Thomas A. Fiske	5,347	0.18%
Majority		249,968	8.37%
Turnout		2,987,634	100.00%
Democratic hold			

== New Mexico ==
New Mexico election
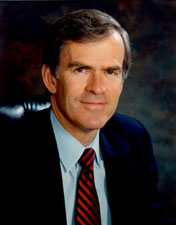

Nominee	Jeff Bingaman	Bill Valentine
Party	Democratic	Republican
Popular vote	321,983	186,579
Percentage	63.3%	36.7%
- County results Bingaman: 50–60% 60–70% 70–80% 80–90% Valentine: 50–60%
U.S. senator before election
Jeff Bingaman
Democratic
Elected U.S. Senator
Jeff Bingaman
Democratic

Incumbent Democrat Jeff Bingaman won re-election to a second term, beating Republican New Mexico State Senator Bill Valentine.

General election results
Party	Candidate	Votes	%	±%
Democratic	Jeff Bingaman (incumbent)	321,983	63.31%	+9.53%
Republican	Bill Valentine	186,579	36.68%	−9.54%
Write-ins		36	0.01%	
Majority		135,404	26.62%	+19.08%
Turnout		508,598		
Democratic hold		Swing		

== New York ==
New York election
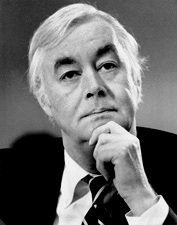

Nominee	Pat Moynihan	Robert McMillan
Party	Democratic	Republican
Popular vote	4,048,649	1,875,784
Percentage	67.0%	31.1%
- County results Moynihan: 40–50% 50–60% 60–70% 70–80% 80–90% McMillan: 50–60%
U.S. senator before election
Pat Moynihan
Democratic
Elected U.S. Senator
Pat Moynihan
Democratic

Incumbent Democrat Daniel Patrick Moynihan won re-election to a third term, over Republican Robert R. McMillan, business executive of Avon Products and Reagan Administration advisor.

General election results
Party	Candidate	Votes	%
Democratic	Daniel Patrick Moynihan (incumbent)	4,048,649	67.0
Republican	Robert R. McMillan	1,875,784	31.1
Right to Life	Adelle R. Nathanson	64,845	1.1
Independent Progressive	Charlene Mitchell	14,770	0.2
Workers World	Lydia Bayoneta	13,573	0.2
Libertarian	William P. McMillen	12,064	0.2
Socialist Workers	James E. Harris	11,239	0.2
Total votes		6,040,924	100.00%
Majority		2,172,865	35.9%
Democratic hold			

== North Dakota ==
North Dakota election
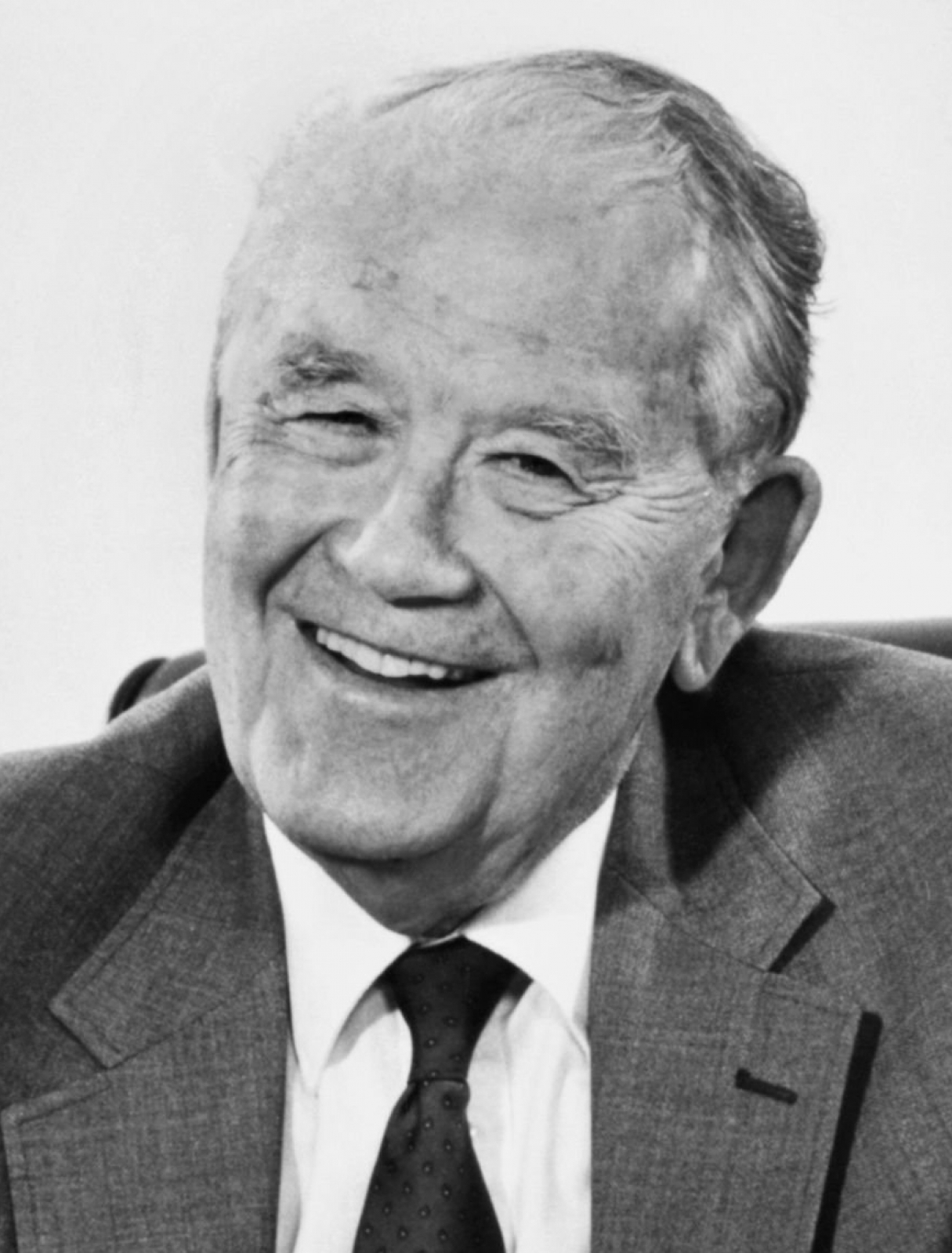

Nominee	Quentin Burdick	Earl Strinden
Party	Democratic–NPL	Republican
Popular vote	171,899	112,937
Percentage	59.45%	39.06%
- County results Burdick: 50–60% 60–70% 70–80% Strinden: 40–50% 50–60%
U.S. Senator before election
Quentin Burdick
Democratic
Elected U.S. Senator
Quentin Burdick
Democratic

The incumbent, Quentin Burdick of the North Dakota Democratic NPL Party, sought and received re-election to his sixth term, defeating Republican candidate Earl Strinden.

Only Burdick filed as a Dem-NPLer, and the endorsed Republican candidate was Earl Strinden of Grand Forks, North Dakota, president of the University of North Dakota Alumni Association. As in Burdick's previous re-election campaign, the senator's age became an issue for voters, as he was 80 years old during the campaign. However, challenger Strinden commented that he did not want to raise the age issue. Burdick and Strinden won the primary elections for their respective parties.

The Burdick campaign hired high-profile Washington, D.C. campaign consultant Bob Squire of Squire Eskew Communications. To counter the potential age issue, Burdick successfully focused the message on the clout he had earned over decades in the Senate, as well as his chairmanship of Senate Agricultural Appropriations sub-committee and Senate Environment and Public Works Committee.

One independent candidate, Kenneth C. Gardner, also filed before the deadline, officially calling himself a libertarian. Gardner had previously run for North Dakota's other United States Senate seat as an independent in 1974, challenging Milton Young. He only received 853 votes in that election.

1988 United States Senate election, North Dakota
Party	Candidate	Votes	%
Democratic–NPL	Quentin Burdick (incumbent)	171,899	59.45
Republican	Earl Strinden	112,937	39.06
Independent	Kenneth C. Gardner	4,334	1.50
Majority		58,962	20.39
Turnout		289,170	
Democratic–NPL hold			

== Ohio ==
Ohio election
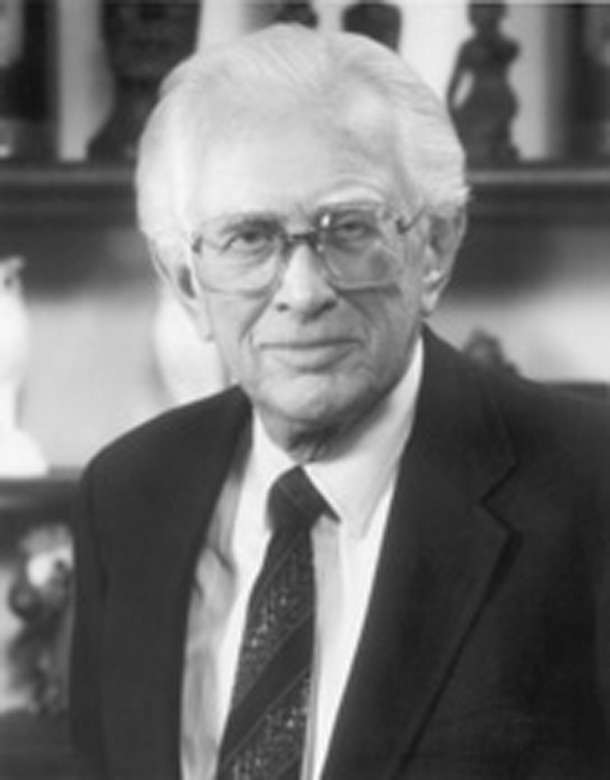

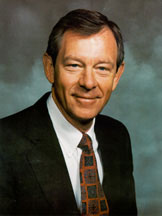
Nominee	Howard Metzenbaum	George Voinovich
Party	Democratic	Republican
Popular vote	2,480,038	1,872,716
Percentage	56.97%	42.31%
- County results Metzenbaum: 50–60% 60–70% 70–80% Voinovich: 50–60% 60–70%
U.S. senator before election
Howard Metzenbaum
Democratic
Elected U.S. Senator
Howard Metzenbaum
Democratic

Incumbent Democrat Howard Metzenbaum won re-election over George Voinovich, mayor of Cleveland and former lieutenant governor of Ohio.

1988 Ohio United States Senate election
Party	Candidate	Votes	%
Democratic	Howard Morton Metzenbaum (incumbent)	2,480,038	56.97%
Republican	George Victor Voinovich	1,872,716	42.31%
Independent	David Marshall	151	0.00%
Majority		607,322	8.68%
Turnout		4,352,905	100.00%
Democratic hold			

== Pennsylvania ==
Pennsylvania election
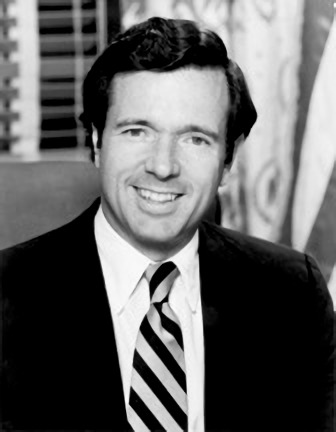

Nominee	John Heinz	Joseph Vignola
Party	Republican	Democratic
Popular vote	2,901,715	1,416,764
Percentage	66.5%	32.5%
- County results Heinz: 50-60% 60-70% 70-80% 80-90% Vignola: 70–80%
U.S. senator before election
H. John Heinz III
Republican
Elected U.S. Senator
H. John Heinz III
Republican

Incumbent Republican H. John Heinz III successfully sought re-election to another term, defeating Democratic nominee Joe Vignola, Philadelphia City Controller.

Vignola was not expected by Democratic Party leaders to have a substantial chance at defeating the popular incumbent Heinz, even predicting that Vignola would become "Heinz's 58th variety," referring to an advertising slogan of the H. J. Heinz Company. Heinz, knowing this, ran a low-profile re-election campaign and was safely ahead in polling. Vignola traveled across Pennsylvania promoting an increase in domestic spending, including education and healthcare, while decreasing the defense budget to compensate. Vignola ran a positive campaign, in contrast with Cyril Wecht six years previously, although many Democratic ward leaders and committee members had given up on the campaign and had stopped campaigning for Vignola.

Heinz easily defeated Vignola to win the election and another term in the Senate, carrying every Pennsylvania county except Philadelphia, Vignola's home town, and by a comfortable 1.49 million vote margin. Heinz performed well in suburban areas, as well as the central, southwestern and northeastern portions of the state. Outside of Philadelphia, Vignola's best county-wide showing was in Mercer County, where he won 36% of the vote, and his poorest county-wide performance was in Snyder County, where he won 12% of the vote. Although Heinz's landslide victory was largely expected among Democratic leaders, he won by a wide margin despite the Democrats' 551,000-voter registration advantage statewide.

Heinz died in an airplane crash on April 4, 1991, in Lower Merion Township, Pennsylvania. Democrat Harris Wofford was appointed on May 8 to fill the vacancy caused by Heinz's death, and subsequently won a special election in November 1991. In the 1994 election, however, Wofford was defeated by Republican Rick Santorum.

General election results
Party	Candidate	Votes	%	±%
Republican	H. John Heinz III (incumbent)	2,901,715	66.45%	+7.17%
Democratic	Joseph Vignola	1,416,764	32.45%	−6.75%
Consumer	Darcy Richardson	25,273	0.58%	+0.12%
Libertarian	Henry E. Haller II	11,822	0.27%	−0.26%
Populist	Samuel Cross	6,455	0.15%	+0.15%
New Alliance	Sam Blancato	4,569	0.11%	+0.11%
Majority		1,484,951	34.00%	+13.92%
Total votes		4,366,598	100.00%	
Republican hold		Swing		

== Rhode Island ==
Rhode Island election
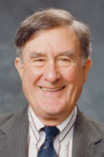

Nominee	John Chafee	Richard Licht
Party	Republican	Democratic
Popular vote	217,273	180,717
Percentage	54.6%	45.4%
- Chafee: 50–60% 60–70% 70–80% Licht: 50–60% 60–70%
U.S. senator before election
John Chafee
Republican
Elected U.S. Senator
John Chafee
Republican

Incumbent Republican John Chafee won re-election to a third term, beating Democratic lieutenant governor and former state senator Richard Licht.

General election results
Party	Candidate	Votes	%	±%
Republican	John Chafee (incumbent)	217,273	54.59%	+3.39%
Democratic	Richard Licht	180,717	45.41%	−3.39%
Majority		36,556	9.19%	+6.79%
Turnout		397,990		
Republican hold		Swing		

== Tennessee ==
Tennessee election

Nominee	Jim Sasser	Bill Anderson
Party	Democratic	Republican
Popular vote	1,020,061	541,033
Percentage	65.09%	34.52%
- County results Sasser: 50–60% 60–70% 70–80% 80–90% Andersen: 50–60%
U.S. senator before election
Jim Sasser
Democratic
Elected U.S. Senator
Jim Sasser
Democratic

Incumbent Democrat Jim Sasser won re-election to a third term over Republican Bill Anderson.

Tennessee United States Senate election 1988
Party	Candidate	Votes	%	±%
Democratic	Jim Sasser (incumbent)	1,020,061	65.09%	
Republican	Bill Anderson	541,033	34.52%	−30.57%
Independent	Khalil-Ullah Al-Muhaymin	6,042	0.39%	−64.70%
Others	(W) Others	45	0.00	−65.09%
Majority		479,028	30.57%	
Turnout		1,561,094		
Democratic hold		Swing		

== Texas ==
Texas election
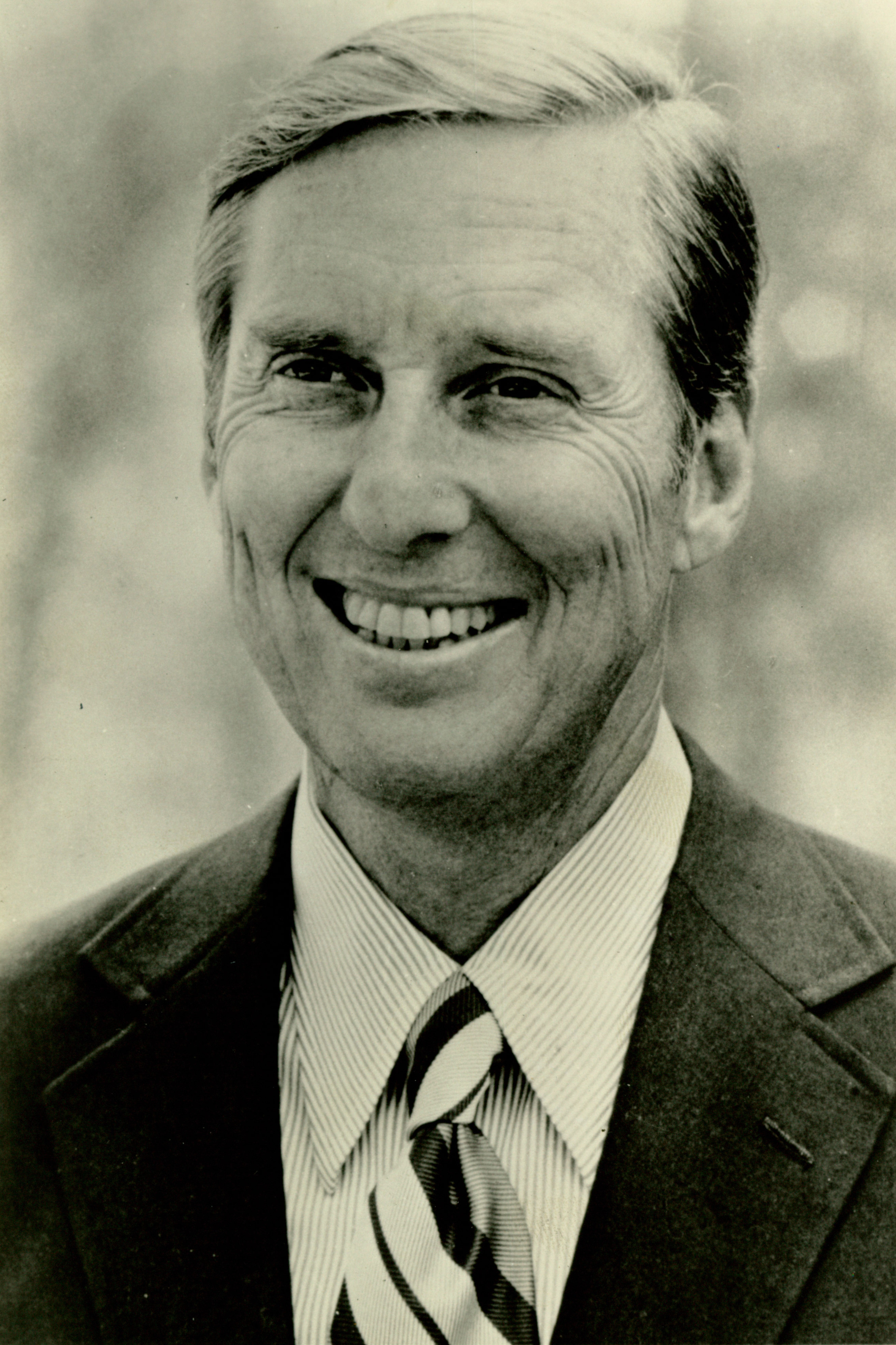

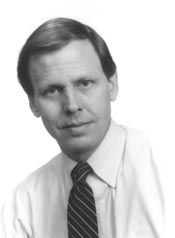
Nominee	Lloyd Bentsen	Beau Boulter
Party	Democratic	Republican
Popular vote	3,149,806	2,129,228
Percentage	59.2%	40.0%
- Bentsen: 50–60% 60–70% 70–80% 80–90% >90% Boulter: 50–60% 60–70%
U.S. senator before election
Lloyd Bentsen
Democratic
Elected U.S. Senator
Lloyd Bentsen
Democratic

Incumbent Democrat Lloyd Bentsen won re-election to a fourth term, defeating Republican Representative Beau Boulter.

Bentsen easily won the Democratic nomination for another term, while Boulter came through a run-off in the Republican primary, defeating Wes Gilbreath. After being nominated for the Senate, Bentsen was chosen by Michael Dukakis as his vice-presidential running mate, and therefore ran for both the Senate and the vice presidency at the same time. Bentsen was always the favorite for the Senate election, and won with 59.2% of the vote, compared to 40% for Boulter.

As of 2024, this was the last time a Democrat won a United States Senate election in Texas.

In the Democratic primary, Democratic senator Lloyd Bentsen defeated the same opponent he had beaten in 1982, Joe Sullivan, a psychology professor from San Antonio.

Bentsen had been senator from Texas since first winning election in 1970, and had been re-elected in 1976 and 1982. He was also chairman of the Senate Finance Committee and the clear favourite for re-election in 1988. Sullivan's platform called for reduced spending by the federal government, but had been easily defeated by Bentsen in the 1982 Democratic primary. This was repeated in 1988, with Bentsen winning the primary with over 80% of the vote.

March 8 Democratic primary results
Party	Candidate	Votes	%	±%
Democratic	Lloyd Bentsen	1,365,736	84.8	
Democratic	Joe Sullivan	244,805	15.2	
Total votes		1,610,541	100	

Four candidates competed for the Republican nomination U.S. representative Beau Boulter, former state representative Milton Fox, millionaire Houston businessman Wes Gilbreath, and businessman Ned Snead. Boulter was a two-term representative for the 13th district, while Gilbreath was competing in his first election, but spent $500,000 on the primary.

Gilbreath led in the March primary with 36.7%, but as no candidate won a majority, went into a run-off election against Beau Boulter, who came second with 30.5%.

March 8 Republican primary results
Party	Candidate	Votes	%
Republican	Wes Gilbreath	275,080	36.7
Republican	Beau Boulter	228,676	30.5
Republican	Milton Fox	138,031	18.4
Republican	Ned Snead	107,560	14.4
Total votes		749,347	100

There were few policy differences between Boulter and Gilbreath, with both candidates being conservatives who opposed abortion and called for reduced government spending. Gilbreath spent about one million dollars of his money in his contest for the primary, while Boulter spent about $250,000. However, Boulter won endorsements from many Texas Republican leaders, including the candidates who had come third and fourth in the March primary, as well as from anti-abortion groups.

Boulter won the April run-off for the Republican nomination with just over 60% of the vote.

April 12 Republican run-off results
Party	Candidate	Votes	%
Republican	Beau Boulter	111,134	60.2
Republican	Wes Gilbreath	73,573	39.8
Total votes		184,707	100

In July 1988 the Democratic presidential nominee Michael Dukakis chose Lloyd Bentsen to be the Democratic vice-presidential candidate. As the Texas Democrats had already had their primary for Senate candidate, Bentsen could not be replaced on the ballot. Bentsen was, however, able to run both for the Senate and for vice president, as Lyndon Johnson had gotten Texas law changed in 1960 to allow Johnson to do the same in the 1960 election.

Lloyd Bentsen won the Senate election by a clear margin over Beau Boulter, at the same time that he and Michael Dukakis lost the presidential race, with George Bush winning Texas with 56% of the vote, compared to 43% for Dukakis. Bentsen's vote total in the Senate election was reported to be at the time the highest vote total in any Texas statewide election. Bentsen then returned to the Senate and remained until the next four years, when he was appointed the Secretary of the Treasury under President Bill Clinton. Had the Dukakis–Bentsen ticket won, Bentsen would have become U.S. vice president and been forced to resign his Senate seat, which would have led to a 1990 special election. It would also have led Republican Governor Bill Clements to temporarily appoint an interim replacement.

General election results
Party	Candidate	Votes	%	±%
Democratic	Lloyd Bentsen (incumbent)	3,149,806	59.2	+0.6
Republican	Beau Boulter	2,129,228	40.0	−0.5
Libertarian	Jeff Daiell	44,572	0.8	
Majority		1,020,578	19.2	+1.1
Turnout		5,323,606		
Democratic hold		Swing		

== Utah ==
Utah election
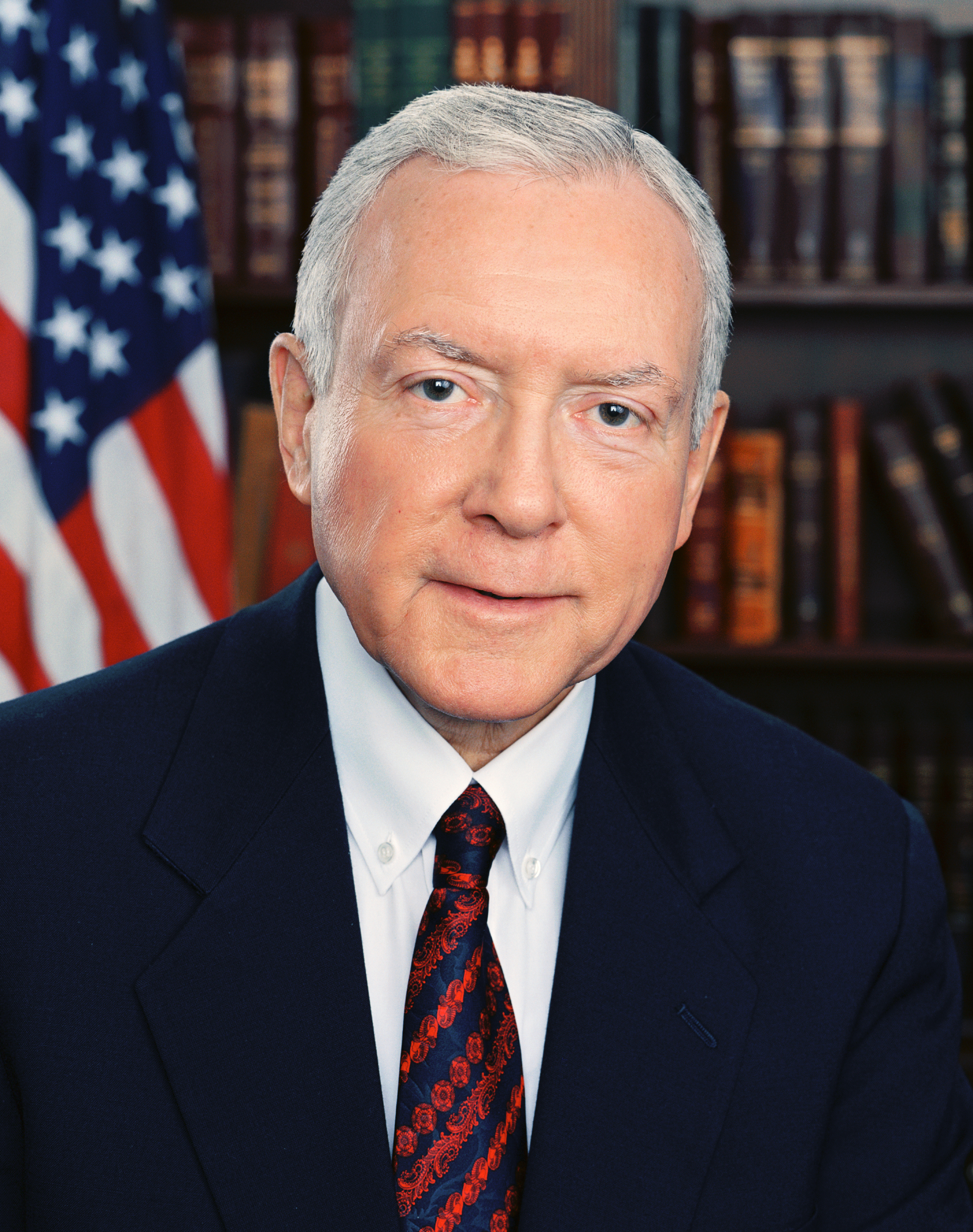

Nominee	Orrin Hatch	Brian Moss
Party	Republican	Democratic
Popular vote	430,084	203,364
Percentage	67.13%	31.74%
- County results Hatch: 50-60% 60-70% 70-80% 80-90% Moss: 60–70%
U.S. senator before election
Orrin Hatch
Republican
Elected U.S. Senator
Orrin Hatch
Republican

Incumbent Orrin Hatch easily won re-election to a third term over Democrat Brian Moss.

1988 United States Senate election in Utah
Party	Candidate	Votes	%
Republican	Orrin Hatch (incumbent)	430,084	67.13%
Democratic	Brian H. Moss	203,364	31.74%
American	Robert J. Smith	6,016	0.94%
Socialist Workers	William M. Arth	1,233	0.19%
Majority		227,720	35.39%
Total votes		640,697	100.00%
Republican hold			

== Vermont ==
Vermont election
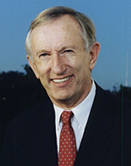

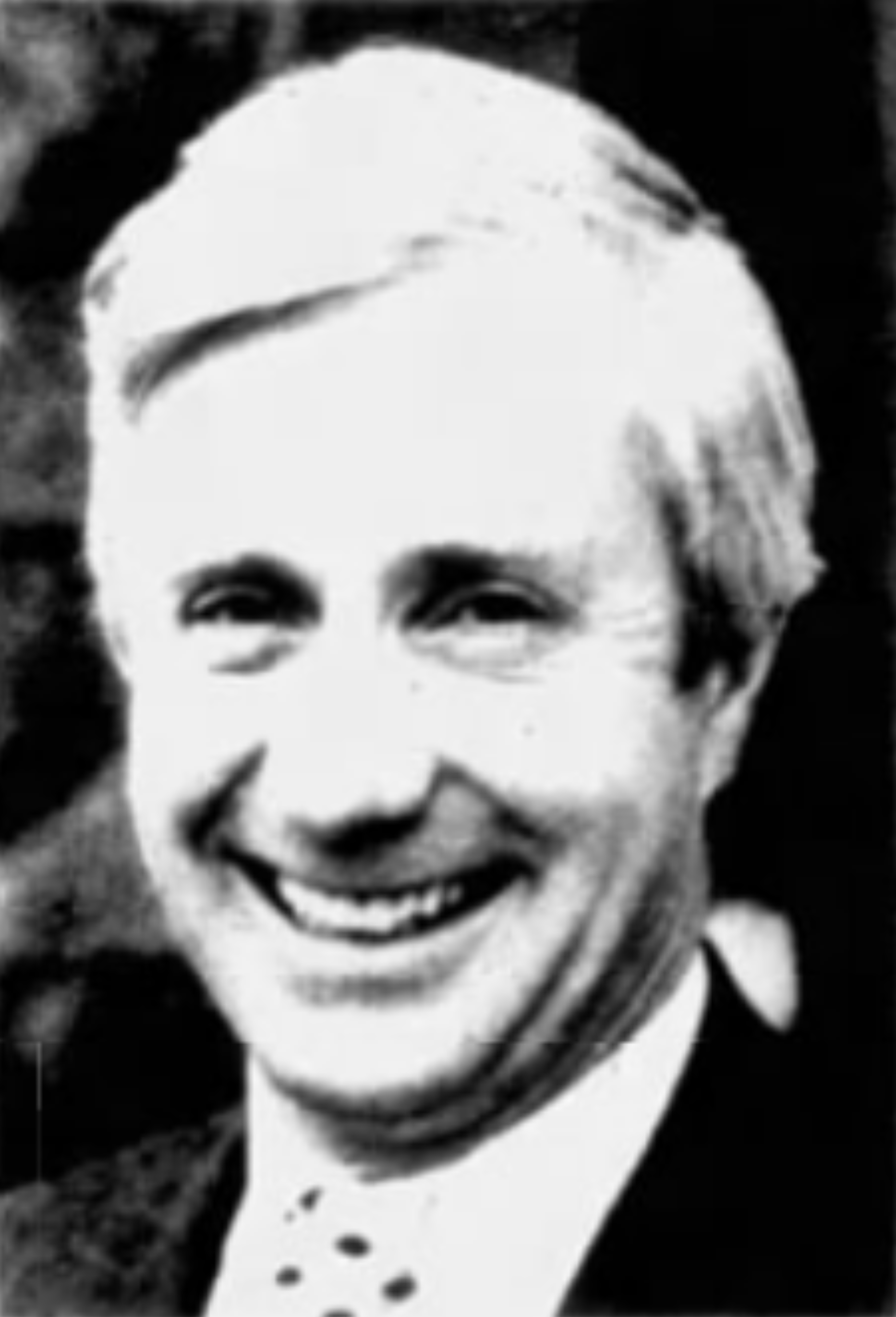
Nominee	Jim Jeffords	Bill Gray
Party	Republican	Democratic
Popular vote	163,203	71,469
Percentage	68.0%	29.8%
- Jeffords: 50–60% 60–70% 70–80% 80–90% Gray: 40–50%
U.S. senator before election
Robert Stafford
Republican
Elected U.S. Senator
Jim Jeffords
Republican

Incumbent Republican Robert Stafford did not run for re-election to another term in the United States Senate. Republican candidate Jim Jeffords defeated Democratic candidate Bill Gray to succeed him.

Republican primary results
Party	Candidate	Votes	%
Republican	Jim Jeffords	30,555	60.8
Republican	Mike Griffes	19,593	38.9
Republican	Other	128	0.3
Total votes		'50,276'	'100'

Democratic primary results
Party	Candidate	Votes	%
Democratic	Bill Gray	23,138	91.5
Democratic	Other	2,149	8.5
Total votes		'25,287'	'100'

1988 United States Senate election in Vermont
Party	Candidate	Votes	%
Republican	Jim Jeffords	163,203	63.2
Democratic	Bill Gray	71,469	29.8
Liberty Union	Jerry Levy	2,506	1.0
Independent	King Milne	2,424	1.0
N/A	Other	509	0.2
Majority		91,736	33.4
Total votes		240,111	100.0
Republican hold			

== Virginia ==
Virginia election
- Turnout: 49.8% (voting eligible)
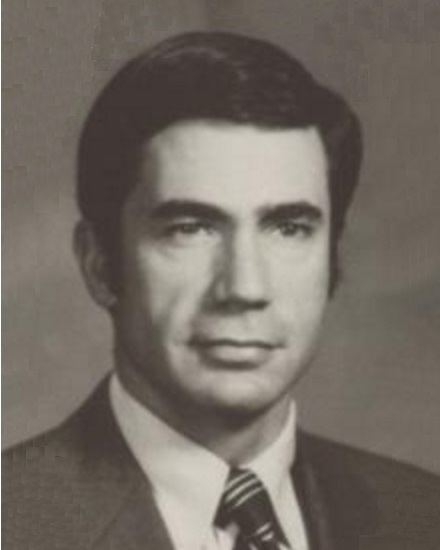

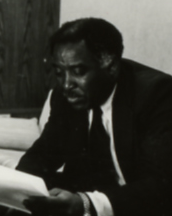
Nominee	Chuck Robb	Maurice A. Dawkins
Party	Democratic	Republican
Popular vote	1,474,086	593,652
Percentage	71.3%	28.7%
- County and independent city results Robb: 50-60% 60-70% 70-80% 80-90%
U.S. senator before election
Paul S. Trible
Republican
Elected U.S. Senator
Chuck Robb
Democratic

Former Democratic governor Chuck Robb replaced Republican Senator Paul S. Trible Jr., who opted not to run for re-election. Robb beat Republican Maurice A. Dawkins, a minister and black activist.

1988 United States Senate election in Virginia
Party	Candidate	Votes	%	±%
Democratic	Chuck Robb	1,474,086	71.25%	+22.45%
Republican	Maurice A. Dawkins	593,652	28.69%	−22.51%
Write-ins		1,159	0.06%	
Majority		880,434	42.56%	+40.18%
Turnout		2,068,897		
Democratic gain from Republican		Swing		

== Washington ==
Washington election
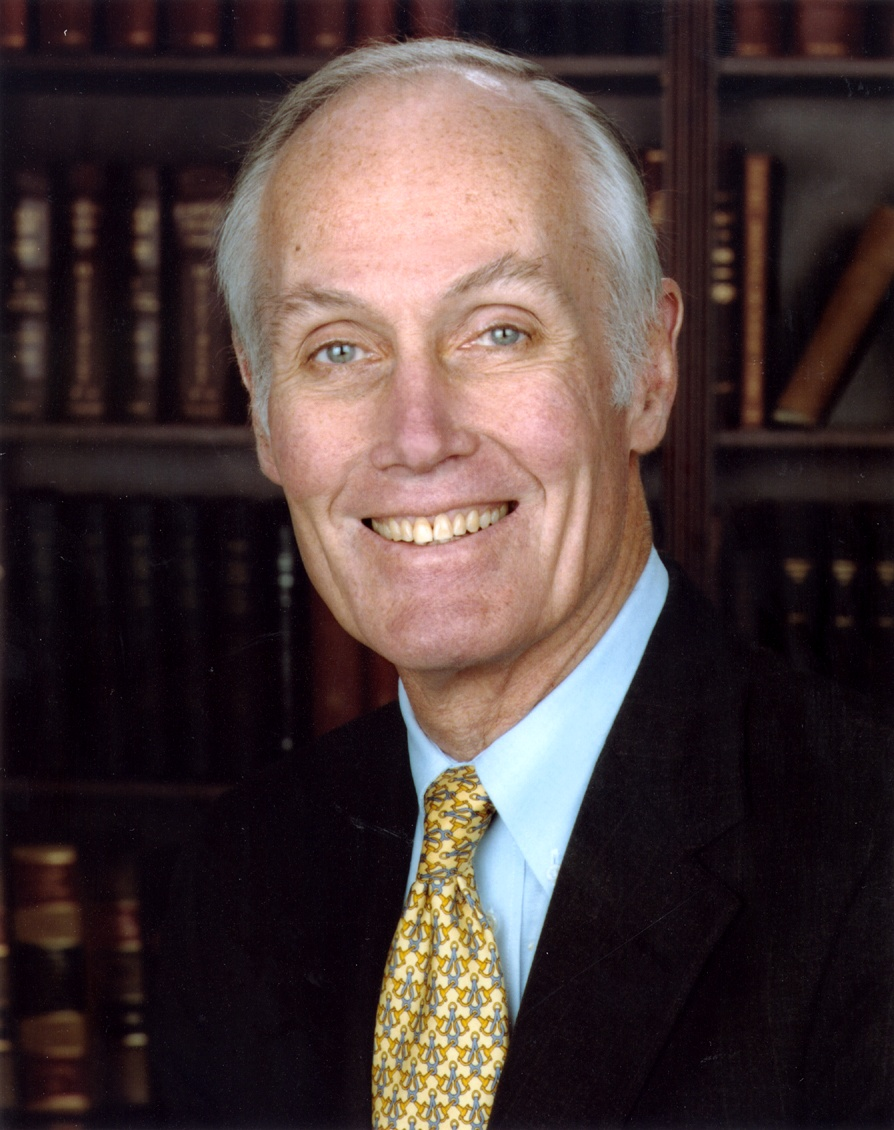

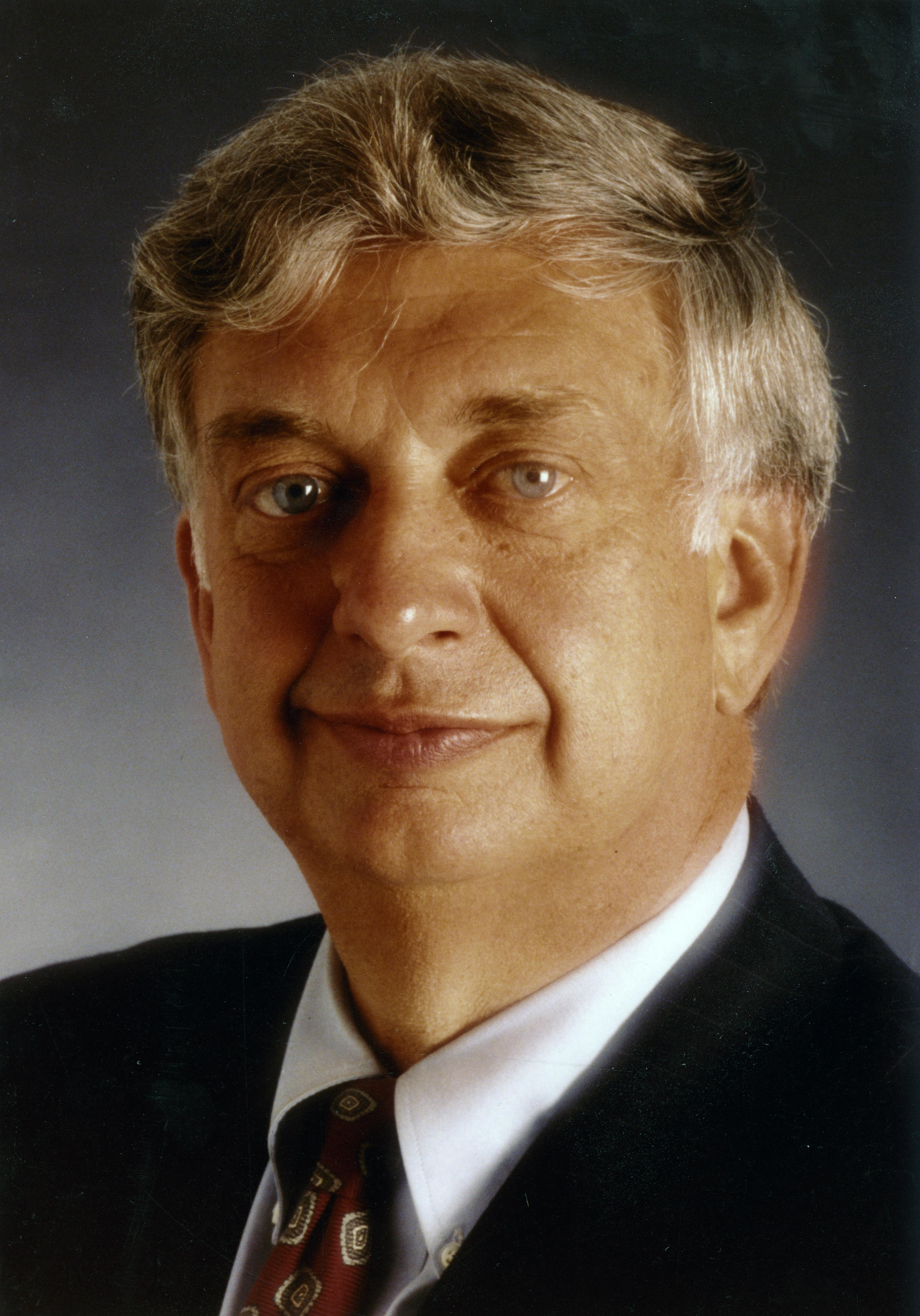
Nominee	Slade Gorton	Mike Lowry
Party	Republican	Democratic
Popular vote	944,359	904,183
Percentage	51.1%	48.9%
- County results Gorton: 50-60% 60-70% 70-80% 80-90% Lowry: 50–60%
U.S. senator before election
Daniel J. Evans
Republican
Elected U.S. Senator
Slade Gorton
Republican

Incumbent Republican Daniel J. Evans decided to retire instead of running for re-election to a full term, after being appointed to the seat in 1983, and won election to a partial term that same year. Republican former U.S. Senator Slade Gorton, who had just lost a re-election bid in 1986, won the open seat over Congressman Mike Lowry.

General election results
Party	Candidate	Votes	%
Republican	Slade Gorton	944,359	51.09
Democratic	Mike Lowry	904,183	48.91
Majority		40,176	2.17
Turnout		1,848,542	
Republican hold			

== West Virginia ==
West Virginia election
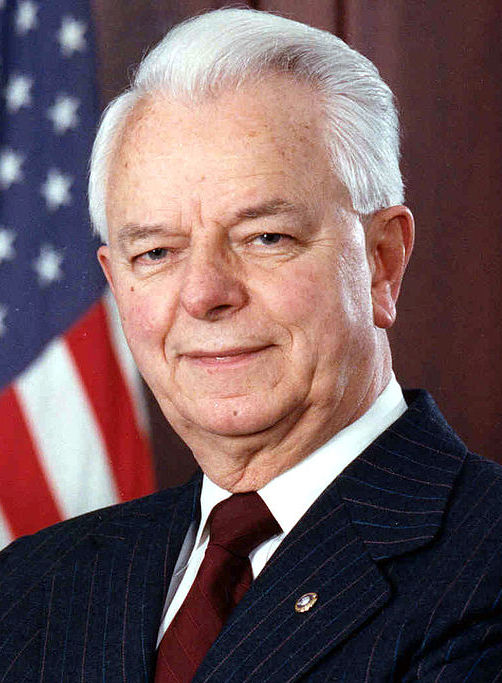

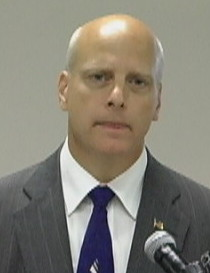
Nominee	Robert Byrd	Jay Wolfe
Party	Democratic	Republican
Popular vote	410,983	223,564
Percentage	64.8%	31.0%
- County results Byrd: 50–60% 60–70% 70–80% Wolfe: 50–60%
U.S. senator before election
Robert Byrd
Democratic
Elected U.S. Senator
Robert Byrd
Democratic

Incumbent Democrat Robert Byrd won re-election to a sixth term over Republican, State Senator Jay Wolfe.

General election results
Party	Candidate	Votes	%
Democratic	Robert Byrd (incumbent)	410,983	64.8%
Republican	Jay Wolfe	223,564	35.2%
Total votes		634,547	100.00%
Majority		187,319	29.6%
Democratic hold			

== Wisconsin ==
Wisconsin election
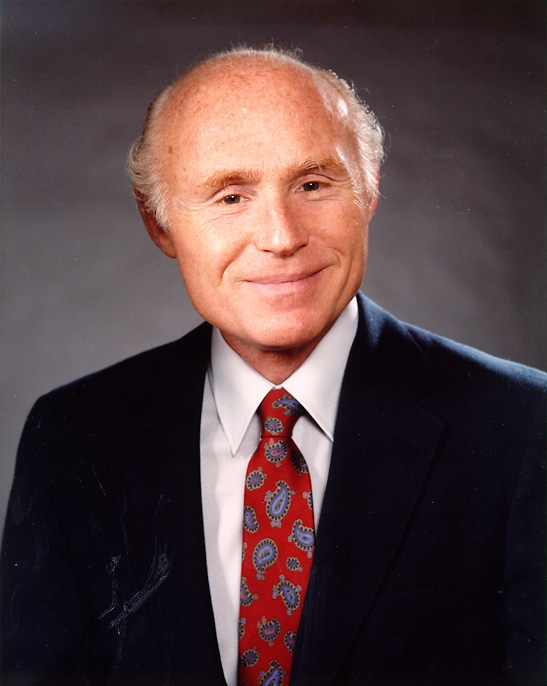

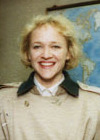
Nominee	Herb Kohl	Susan Engeleiter
Party	Democratic	Republican
Popular vote	1,128,625	1,030,440
Percentage	52.1%	47.6%
- County results Kohl: 50–60% 60–70% 70–80% Engeleiter: 40–50% 50–60% 60–70%
U.S. senator before election
William Proxmire
Democratic
Elected U.S. Senator
Herb Kohl
Democratic

Incumbent Democrat William Proxmire decided to retire, instead of running for re-election to a sixth full term. Democratic businessman Herb Kohl won the open seat, beating Republican state senator Susan Engeleiter.

General election results
Party	Candidate	Votes	%
Democratic	Herb Kohl	1,128,625	52.1%
Republican	Susan Engeleiter	1,030,440	47.6%
Independent	George W. Zaehringer	3,965	0.2%
Socialist Workers	Patricia Grogan	3,029	0.1%
Independent	Arlyn F. Wollenburg	1,198	0.1%
Total votes		2,167,257	100.00%
Majority		98,185	4.5%
Democratic hold			

== Wyoming ==
Wyoming election
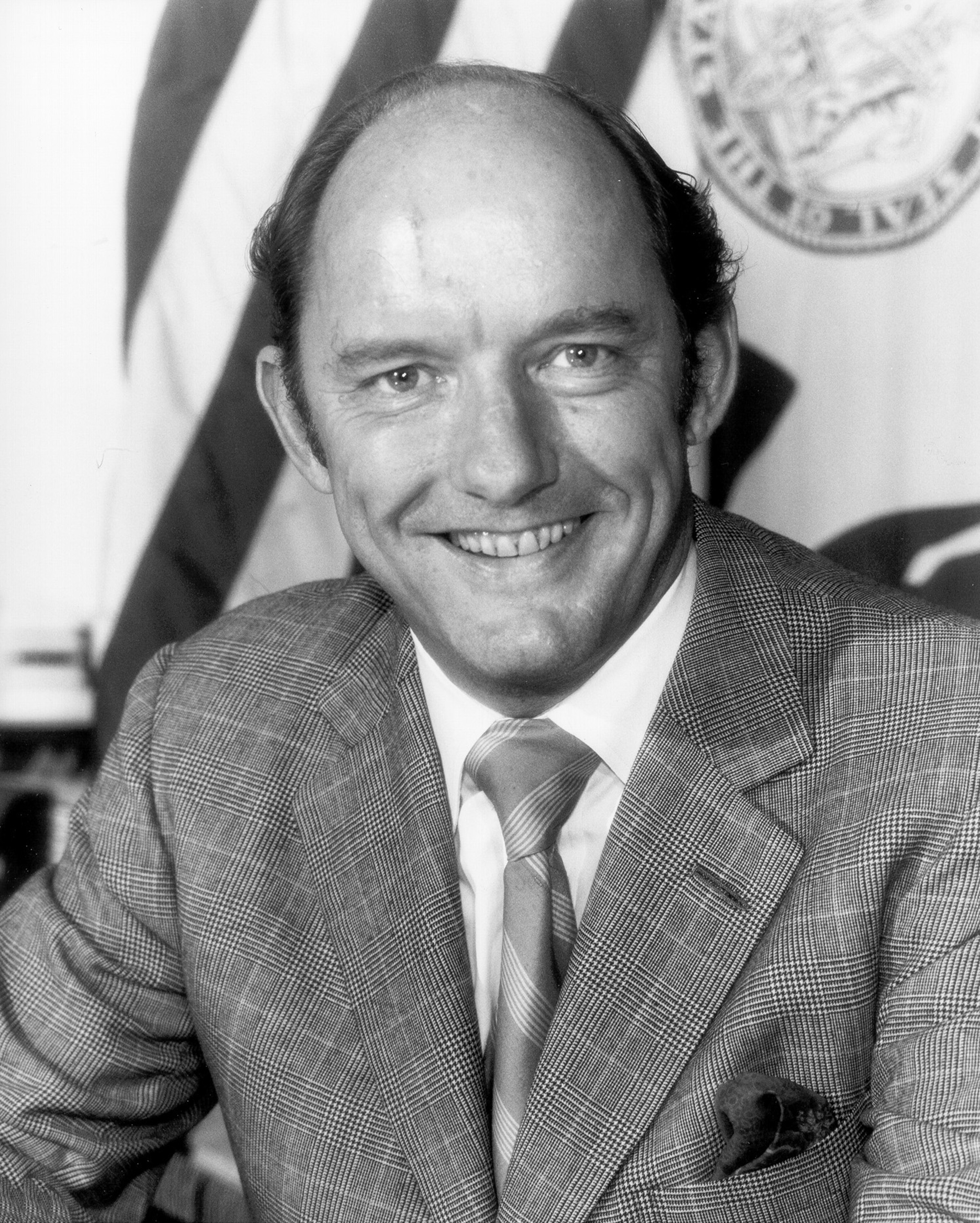

Nominee	Malcolm Wallop	John Vinich
Party	Republican	Democratic
Popular vote	91,143	89,821
Percentage	50.37%	49.64%
- County results Wallop: 50–60% 60–70% 70–80% Vinich: 50–60%
U.S. senator before election
Malcolm Wallop
Republican
Elected U.S. Senator
Malcolm Wallop
Republican

Incumbent Republican Malcolm Wallop ran for re-election to a fourth term, and was narrowly re-elected, defeating the Democratic state senator John Vinich by a margin of a little over 1,300 votes.

Despite being a reliably Republican state, Vinich, a Democrat, was able to impressively compete with Wallop. During the campaign, Wallop attacked Vinich as being a tax-and-spend liberal who was beholden to labor and anti-business. Vinich, in turn, cited his "A" score he was given by the National Rifle Association of America due to his votes in the Wyoming Legislature to counter Wallop's attacks, and possibly attract conservative voters.

General election results
Party	Candidate	Votes	%
Republican	Malcolm Wallop (incumbent)	91,143	50.37%
Democratic	John Vinich	89,821	49.64%
Total votes		180,964	100.00%
Majority		1,322	0.73%
Republican hold			

== See also ==
- 1988 United States elections
  - 1988 United States gubernatorial elections
  - 1988 United States presidential election
  - 1988 United States House of Representatives elections
- 100th United States Congress
- 101st United States Congress
