= David N. Levinson =

American politician and real state businessman (died 2019)

David N. Levinson was a real estate businessman and a former politician from Delaware.

Levinson attended St. Andrew's School in Delaware for high school He then attended Harvard for both his undergraduate and law school educations. and received both his undergraduate and law degrees from Harvard University.

Levinson was the Insurance Commissioner of Delaware, elected in 1984, and re-elected in 1988. He was appointed by President George H. W. Bush to the federal supplemental health insurance panel. In 1992, he was appointed an official advisor to the Russian Duma. Levnson was an associate commissioner of the Anti Defamation League, and was a member of the Board of Governors of the Middle East Forum, a think tank. Levinson was the developer of Anderson Creek Club, a 4,000-home planned community, and the founder and chairman of the board of directors of Anderson Creek Academy, a charter elementary school. Until his death, he was married to Marilyn W. Levinson, Esq. and has one son, Micah N. Levinson, Ph.D. In 1981, President Jimmy Carter appointed Levinson to his Council for Energy Efficiency. In 1982, he ran for Senate in Delaware but lost.

Levinson died on January 14, 2019, in his home in Anderson Creek, North Carolina.

Party political offices
Preceded by Thomas C. Maloney	Democratic Party nominee for United States Senator (class 1) from Delaware; 1982	Succeeded by Shien Biau Woo
Preceded by Robert J. DuHadaway	Democratic nominee for Delaware Insurance Commissioner; 1984, 1988	Succeeded by James A. Robb
