= 1982 United States Senate election in Delaware =

- November 2, 1982
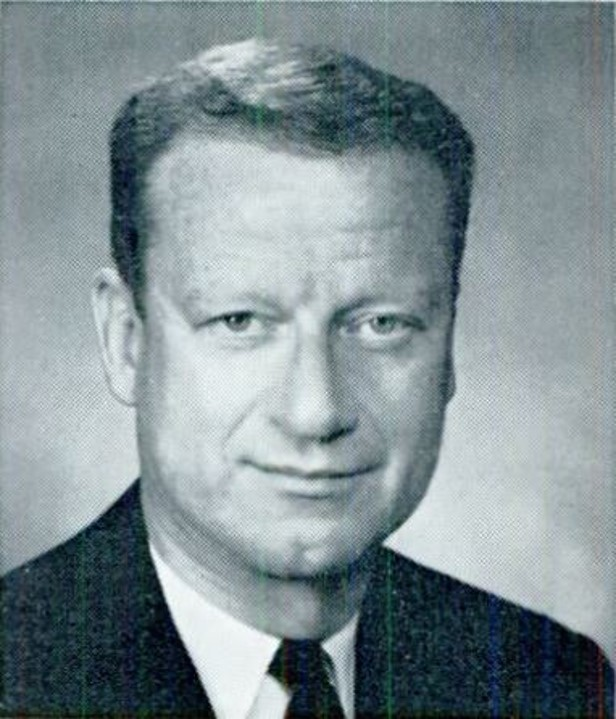

Nominee	Bill Roth	David Levinson
Party	Republican	Democratic
Popular vote	105,357	84,413
Percentage	55.17%	44.20%
- Roth: 40–50% 50–60% 60–70% 70–80% Levinson: 50–60% 60–70% 80–90%
U.S. senator before election
William V. Roth
Republican
Elected U.S. Senator
William V. Roth
Republican

The 1982 United States Senate election in Delaware was held on November 2, 1982. Incumbent Republican U.S. Senator William V. Roth won reelection to a third term.

== Major candidates ==
=== Democratic ===
- David N. Levinson, Insurance Commissioner of Delaware

=== Republican ===
- William V. Roth, incumbent U.S. Senator

== Results ==
General election results
Party	Candidate	Votes	%	±%
Republican	William V. Roth (Incumbent)	105,357	55.17%	−0.64%
Democratic	David N. Levinson	84,413	44.20%	+0.59%
Libertarian	Lawrence Sullivan	653	0.34%	
American Independent	Charles Baker	537	0.28%	−0.01%
Majority		20,944	10.97%	−1.23%
Turnout		190,960		
Republican hold		Swing		

== See also ==
- 1982 United States Senate elections
