= 1970 United States Senate election in Mississippi =

United States Senate election in Mississippi

- November 3, 1970
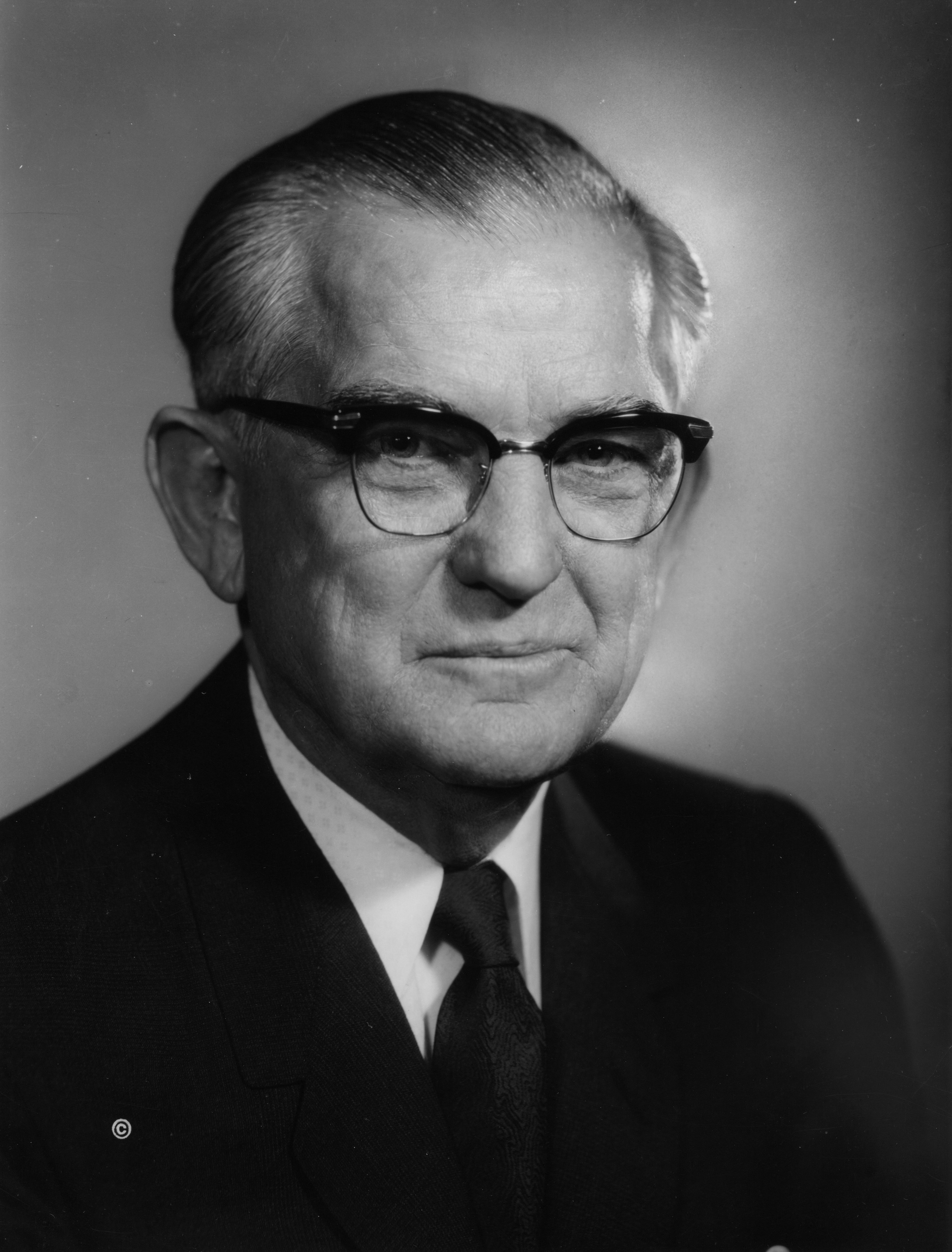

Nominee	John C. Stennis	William Richard Thompson
Party	Democratic	Independent
Popular vote	286,622	37,593
Percentage	88.40%	11.60%
- County results Stennis: 50–60% 60–70% 70–80% 80–90% >90%
U.S. senator before election
John C. Stennis
Democratic
Elected U.S. Senator
John C. Stennis
Democratic

The 1970 United States Senate election in Mississippi was held on November 3, 1970. Incumbent Democratic U.S. Senator John C. Stennis won re-election to his fifth term, easily defeating independent candidate William Richard Thompson.

This race would be one of only two races (the other being 1982) where Stennis would face a general election challenger; as in his other races he had no general election opposition. Stennis won four times in the general election with every vote. (1952, 1958, 1964, and 1976.)

== General election ==
=== Results ===
General election results
Party	Candidate	Votes	%	±%
Democratic	John C. Stennis (incumbent)	286,622	88.40%	▼11.60
Independent	William Richard Thompson	37,593	11.60%	N/A
Total votes		324,215	100.00%	

== See also ==
- 1970 United States Senate elections
