= 1947 United States Senate special election in Mississippi =

- November 4, 1947
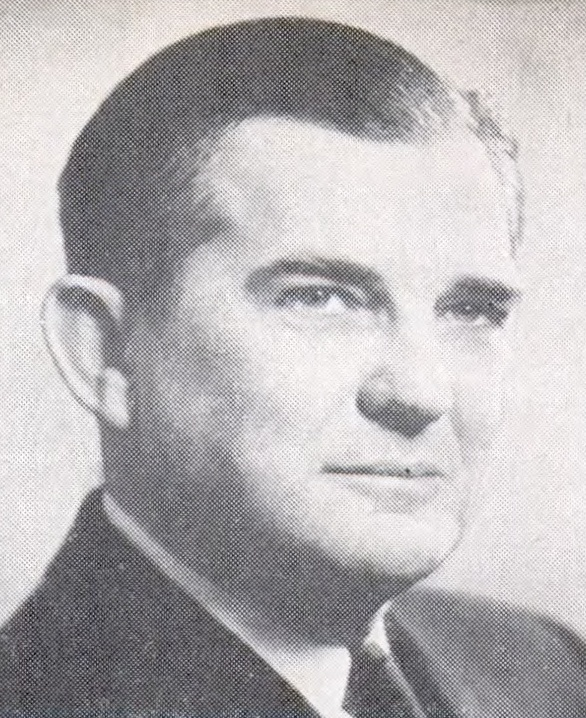

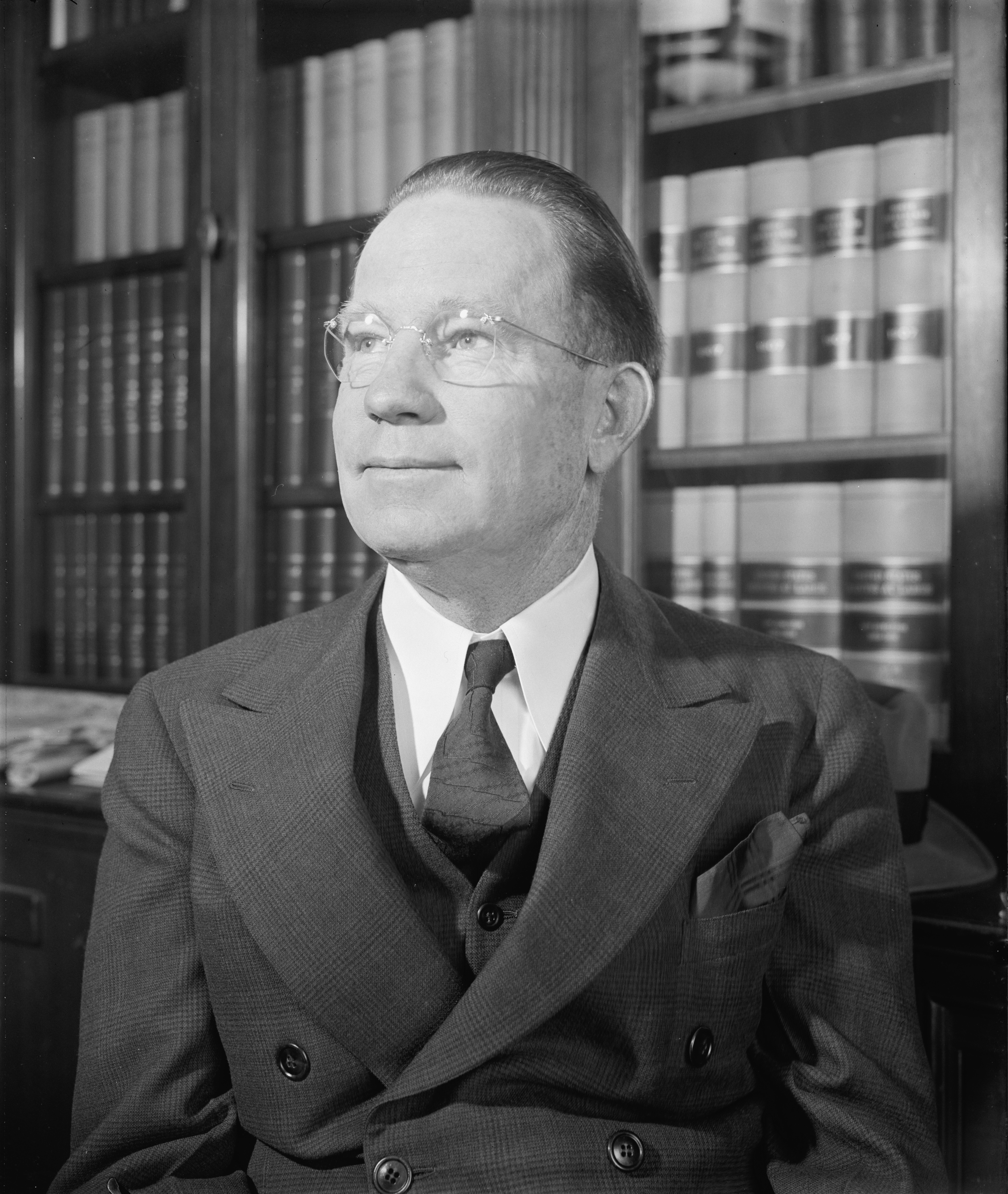

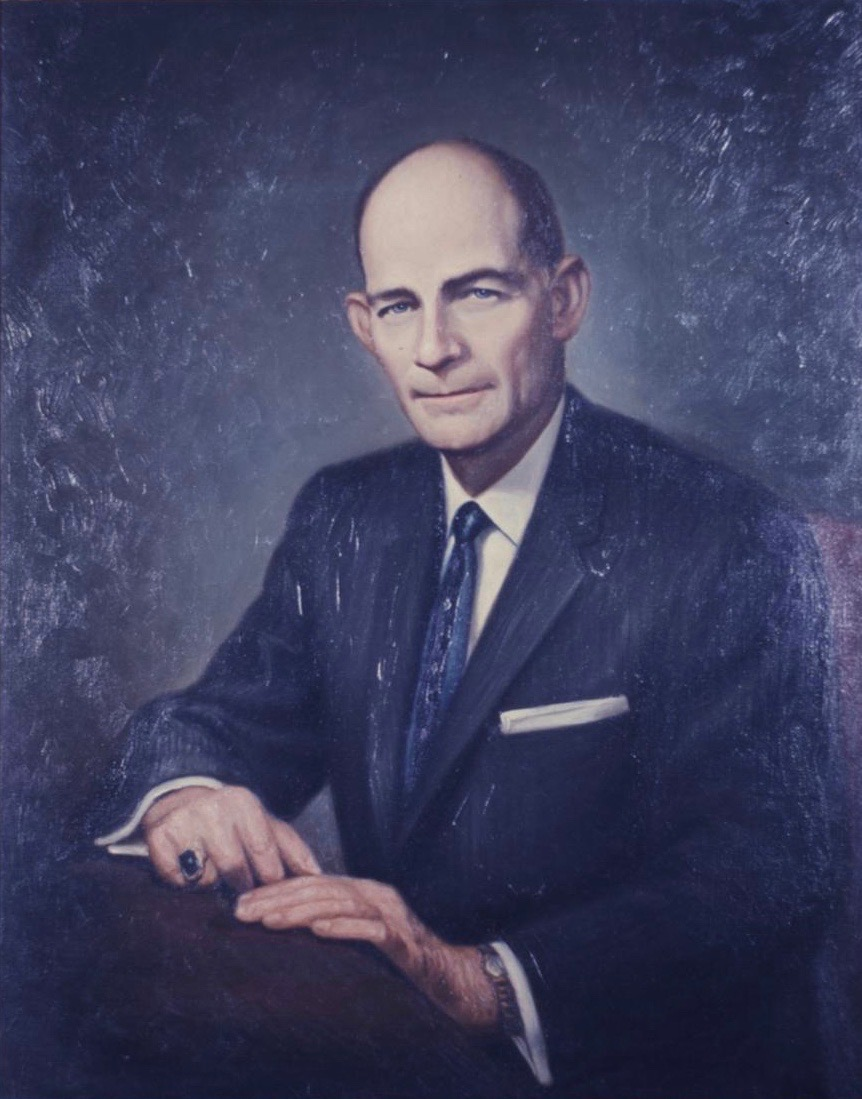

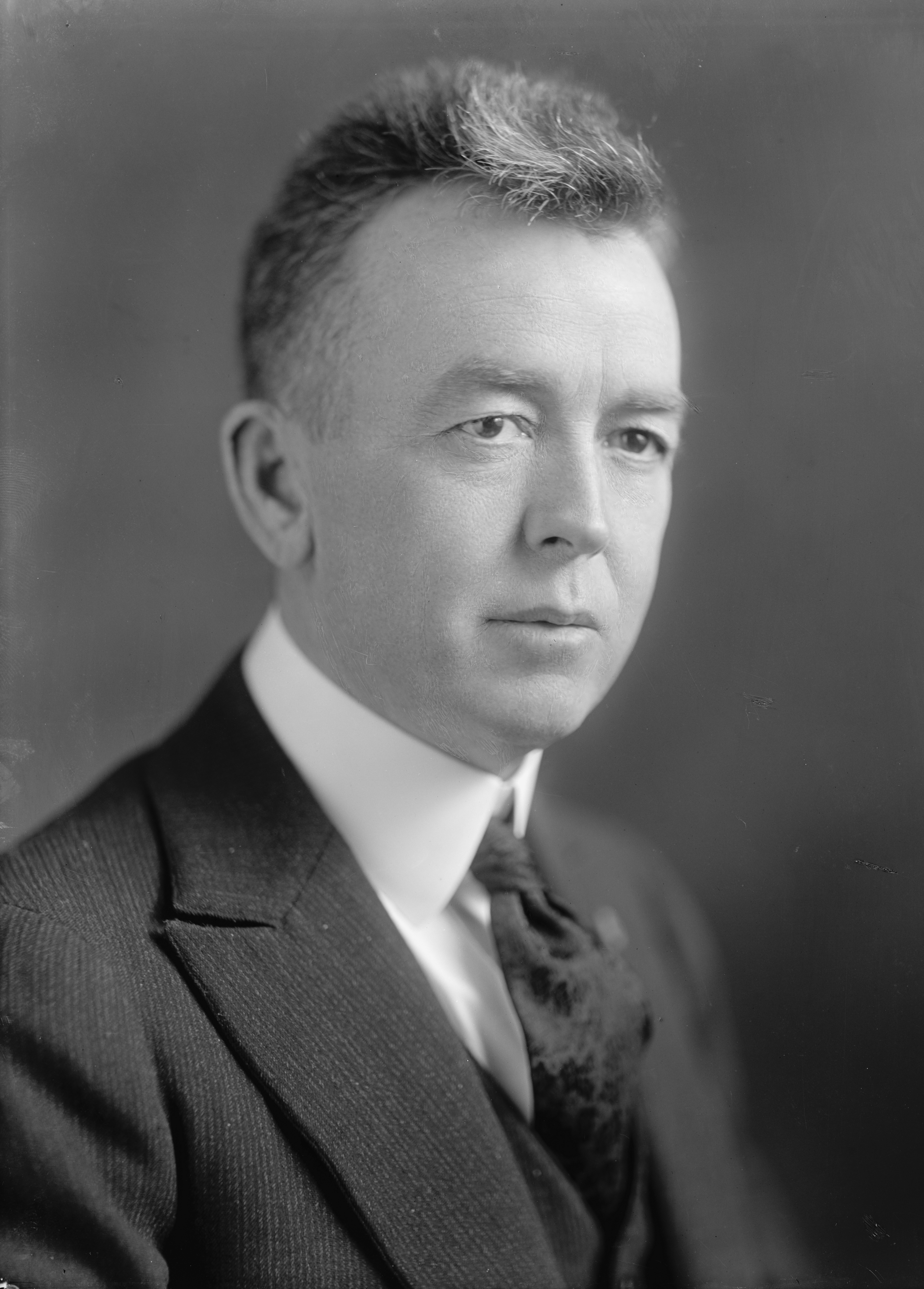
Nominee	John C. Stennis	William M. Colmer	Forrest B. Jackson
Party	Democratic	Democratic	Democratic
Popular vote	52,068	45,725	43,642
Percentage	26.88%	23.61%	22.53%
Nominee	Paul B. Johnson Jr.	John E. Rankin
Party	Democratic	Democratic
Popular vote	27,159	24,492
Percentage	14.02%	12.64%
- County results Stennis: 20–30% 30–40% 40–50% 50–60% 60–70% 70–80% >90% Colmer: 20–30% 30–40% 40–50% 50–60% 60–70% Jackson: 20–30% 30–40% 40–50% 60–70% Johnson: 20–30% 30–40% Rankin: 20–30% 30–40% 40–50% 50–60% 60–70%
U.S. senator before election
Theodore G. Bilbo
Democratic
Elected U.S. Senator
John C. Stennis
Democratic

The 1947 United States Senate special election in Mississippi was held on November 4, 1947. John C. Stennis was elected to fill the seat vacated by the death of Theodore G. Bilbo.

This is the most recent open seat won by a Democrat in Mississippi, as Stennis and his fellow senator James Eastland would continue to be reelected until both being succeeded by Republicans.

== General election ==
=== Candidates ===
- John C. Stennis, former State Representative from Starkville (Note: Stennis represented Starkville during his time as a student at Mississippi State University, but later moved to Kemper County, where he resided in 1947.)
- William M. Colmer, U.S. Representative from Pascagoula
- Forrest B. Jackson
- Paul B. Johnson Jr., son of former governor Paul B. Johnson Sr.
- John E. Rankin, U.S. Representative from Lee County
- L. R. Collins

=== Results ===
1947 United States Senate election
Party	Candidate	Votes	%
Democratic	John C. Stennis	52,068	26.88%
Democratic	William M. Colmer	45,725	23.61%
Democratic	Forrest B. Jackson	43,642	22.53%
Democratic	Paul B. Johnson Jr.	27,159	14.02%
Democratic	John E. Rankin	24,492	12.64%
Republican	L. R. Collins	623	0.32%
