= John C. Stennis =

American politician (1901–1995)

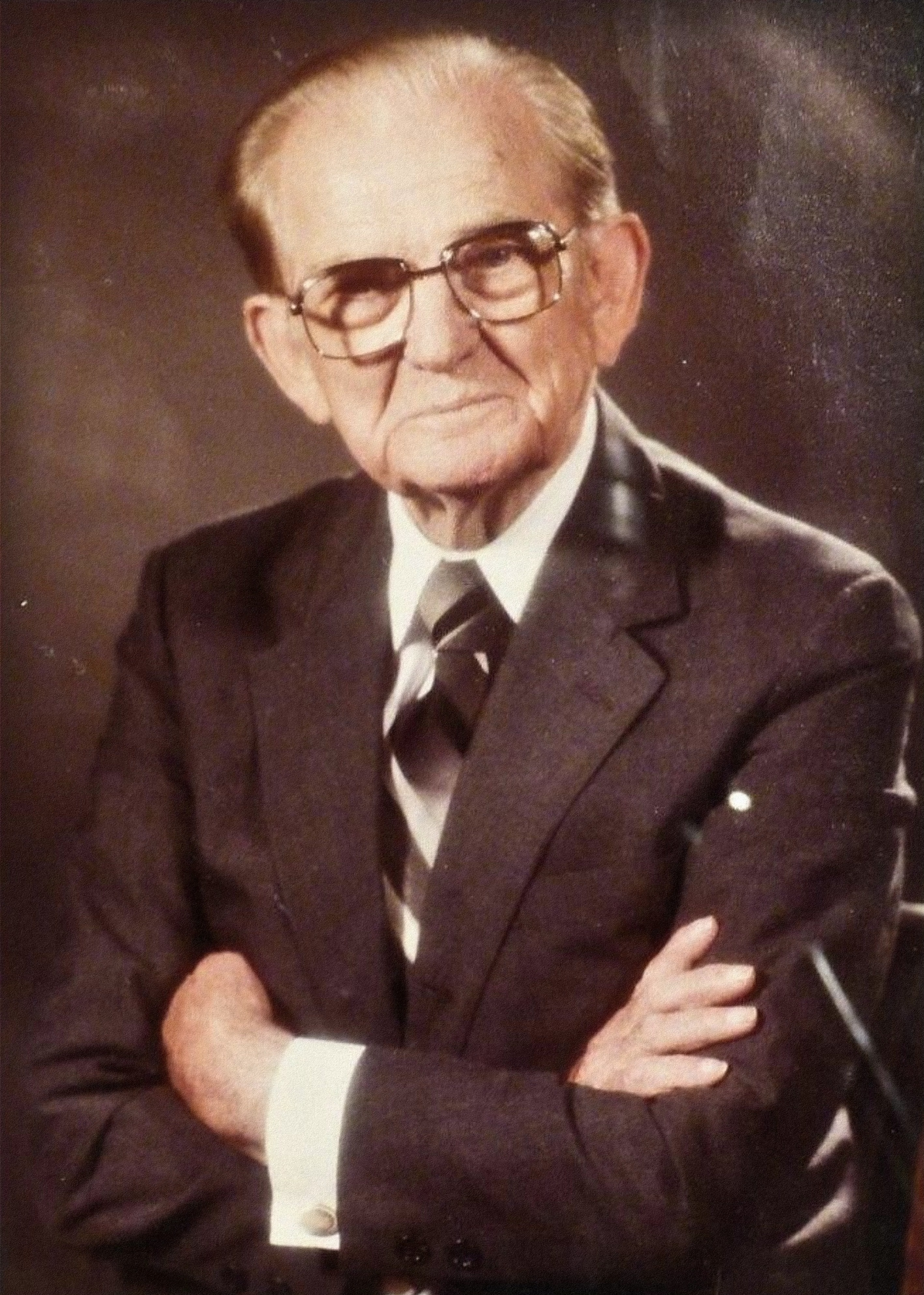
- Stennis in 1984

President pro tempore of the United States Senate
- In office January 3, 1987 – January 3, 1989
- Deputy: George J. Mitchell
- Preceded by: Strom Thurmond
- Succeeded by: Robert Byrd

United States Senator from Mississippi
- In office November 5, 1947 – January 3, 1989
- Preceded by: Theodore Bilbo
- Succeeded by: Trent Lott
Committee chairmanships
Chair of the Senate Appropriations Committee
In office January 3, 1987 – January 3, 1989
Preceded by	Mark Hatfield
Succeeded by	Robert Byrd
Ranking Member of the Senate Appropriations Committee
In office January 3, 1983 – January 3, 1987
Preceded by	William Proxmire
Succeeded by	Mark Hatfield
Ranking Member of the Senate Armed Services Committee
In office January 3, 1981 – January 3, 1983
Preceded by	John Tower
Succeeded by	Scoop Jackson
Chair of the Senate Armed Services Committee
In office January 3, 1969 – January 3, 1981
Preceded by	Richard Russell Jr.
Succeeded by	John Tower
Chair of the Senate Ethics Committee
In office January 3, 1965 – 1974
Preceded by	Committee established
Succeeded by	Howard Cannon

Member of the Mississippi House of Representatives from the Kemper County district
- In office January 1928 – January 1932 Serving with Joseph H. Daws

Personal details
- Born: John Cornelius Stennis; August 3, 1901 Kemper County, Mississippi, U.S.
- Died: April 23, 1995 (aged 93) Jackson, Mississippi, U.S.
- Party: Democratic
- Spouse: Coy Hines
- Children: 2, including John
- Education: Mississippi State University (BA); University of Virginia (LLB)
- John C. Stennis's voice John C. Stennis testifies on televising Senate proceedings before the Senate Rules Committee; Recorded April 14, 1983

John Cornelius Stennis (August 3, 1901 – April 23, 1995) was an American politician who served as a U.S. senator from the state of Mississippi. He was a Democrat who served in the Senate for over 41 years, becoming its most senior member for his last eight years. He retired from the Senate in 1989, and was the last Democrat elected to the U.S. Senate from Mississippi until Scott Colom was elected in 2026. At the time of his retirement, Stennis was the last senator to have served during the presidency of Harry S. Truman.

While attending law school, Stennis won a seat in the Mississippi House of Representatives, holding office from 1928 to 1932. In 1934, Stennis was the trial prosecutor in a case where three African-Americans were convicted of murder after having been violently forced by police to confess. The convictions were later overturned in 1936 by the Supreme Court which ruled that forced confessions could not be used as evidence. After serving as a prosecutor and state judge, Stennis won a special election in 1947 to fill the U.S. Senate vacancy following the death of Theodore G. Bilbo. He won election to a full term in 1952 and remained in the Senate until he declined to seek re-election in 1988.

Stennis became the first Chairman of the Senate Ethics Committee and also chaired the Committee on Armed Services and the Committee on Appropriations. He also served as President pro tempore of the Senate from 1987 to 1989. In 1973, President Richard Nixon proposed the Stennis Compromise, whereby the hard-of-hearing Stennis would be allowed to listen to, and summarize, the Watergate tapes, but this idea was rejected by Special Prosecutor Archibald Cox.

Along with fellow Mississippi senator James Eastland, Stennis was a zealous supporter of racial segregation, with Stennis called "one of twentieth century America's most admired white supremacists." He and Eastland supported the Dixiecrat ticket in 1948 headed by Strom Thurmond, and signed the Southern Manifesto, which called for massive resistance to the Supreme Court ruling in Brown v. Board of Education. He also voted against the Civil Rights Act of 1964, the Voting Rights Act of 1965, and the Civil Rights Act of 1968.

He renounced support for segregation in the early 1980s and supported the extension of the Voting Rights Act in 1982, but he voted against the establishment of Martin Luther King Jr. Day as a national holiday, instead favoring a "commemorative day" because, he claimed, he opposed additional federal holidays.

== Early life and education ==
John Stennis was born into a middle-class family in Kemper County, Mississippi, as the son of Hampton Howell Stennis and Margaret Cornelia Adams. His great-grandfather John Stenhouse emigrated from Scotland to Greenville, South Carolina, just before the American Revolution.

He received a bachelor's degree from Mississippi State University in Starkville (then Mississippi A&M) in 1923. In 1928, Stennis obtained a law degree from the University of Virginia at Charlottesville, where he was a member of Phi Beta Kappa, and Alpha Chi Rho fraternity. While in law school, he won a seat in the Mississippi House of Representatives, representing Kemper County, in which he served until 1932. Stennis was a prosecutor from 1932 to 1937 and a circuit judge from 1937 to 1947, both for Mississippi's Sixteenth Judicial District. He was the prosecuting attorney in a case where three African Americans had been beaten and tortured for a confession; in Brown v. Mississippi, the Supreme Court ruled that it was a clear deception of court and jury by the presentation of testimony known to be perjured, and a clear denial of due process.

Stennis married Coy Hines, and together they had two children, John Hampton and Margaret Jane. His son, John Hampton Stennis (1935–2013), an attorney in Jackson, Mississippi, ran unsuccessfully in 1978 for the United States House of Representatives, defeated by the Republican Jon C. Hinson, then the aide to U.S. Representative Thad Cochran.

== U.S. Senate ==
=== Early career ===
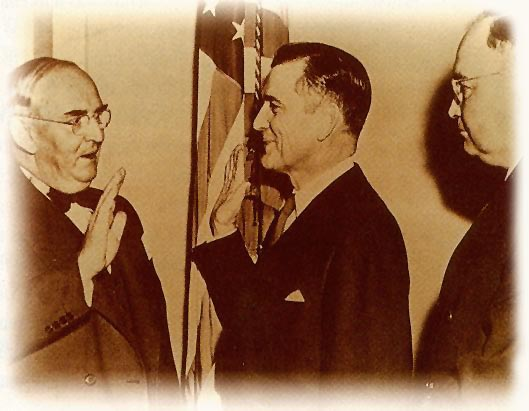
Stennis being sworn into the U.S. Senate by Arthur Vandenberg, 1947. James Eastland, Mississippi's other Senator, stands behind Stennis.

Upon the death of Senator Theodore Bilbo in 1947, Stennis won the special election to fill the vacancy, winning the seat from a field of five candidates (including two sitting Congressmen, John E. Rankin and William M. Colmer). He was elected to a full term in 1952, and was reelected five more times, in 1958, 1964, 1970, 1976, and 1982. From 1947 to 1978, he served alongside James Eastland; thus Stennis spent 31 years as Mississippi's junior senator even though he had more seniority than most of his colleagues. He and Eastland were at the time the longest serving Senate duo in American history, later broken by the South Carolina duo of Strom Thurmond and Fritz Hollings. He later developed a good relationship with Eastland's successor, Republican Thad Cochran.

Leading up to the 1948 Democratic National Convention, Stennis supported the drafting of General Dwight D. Eisenhower as the Democratic nominee amid wide-ranging suspicion that President Truman could not win re-election, considering Eisenhower an acceptable candidate to Southerners. The declaration of support for civil rights at the Democratic National Convention had resulted in Southern members dissatisfied with the move and seeking to espouse their own ideology in the form of a rebellion, Stennis and Eastland being the only sitting senators to openly back the movement. According to biographer Maarten Zwiers, Stennis was less forward in his racism than Eastland and initially hesitated to take an outspoken position against civil rights, likely underestimating the contempt for the civil rights backing of the national party in Mississippi. He adopted harsher condemnation of the program after receiving criticism.

In July 1948, the Senate voted on anti-poll tax legislation. Stennis said Congress did not have the constitutional authority to enact such a measure – it had been brought up for political expediency.

On December 2, 1954, the Senate voted to "condemn" Wisconsin Senator Joseph McCarthy on two counts by a vote of 67 to 22. Two days later, Stennis advocated for the Senate to adopt rule changes proposed by the Special Censure Committee.

In March 1955, Stennis supported legislation that would increase the national cotton acreage with an amendment providing increases in cotton planting and wheat acreage.

Beginning in early 1956, along with Eastland, Allen Ellender, and Strom Thurmond, Stennis was one of several senators to meet in the office of Georgia Senator Richard Russell. Randall Bennett Woods describes the group as being "out for blood" and being pushed by extremists in their respective states to show Southerners would not be intimidated by the North.

In January 1958, senators received a report on the development of intermediate and intercontinental missiles from Bernard A. Schriever. During two interviews after its release, Stennis said attention should be placed on the speed of production and he was satisfied with the contents of the report pertaining to the development of PGM-17 Thor.

In May 1958, responding to President Eisenhower's placing the Arkansas National Guard under federal control and sending in the 101st Airborne Division to escort and protect nine black students' entry to the all-white, public Little Rock Central High School, Stennis announced he had challenged the legality of placing guardsmen there. He stated that the Eisenhower administration had violated both the U.S. Constitution and federal laws, also believing President Eisenhower was neither "reckless nor mischievous".

During the 1960 presidential election campaign, Stennis advocated for Mississippi voters to back Democratic presidential nominee John F. Kennedy rather than a slate of unpledged electors. Mississippi was won in the general election by the unpledged electors.

In July 1961, after Senate Republicans announced that they would cooperate with the Kennedy administration's enlarged defense bill, Stennis stated the possibility of the program requiring a boost in taxes but that he would not vote for an increase until the Senate had made every effort toward finding another way to make the payment.

In early 1962, as the Justice Department retaliated against a Mississippi official charged with refusing to register black voters, Stennis led Southern senators in opposition to the Kennedy administration's literacy test bill during a debate on the measure.

In September 1963, Stennis, Eastland, and Georgia Senator Richard Russell jointly announced their opposition to the ratification of the nuclear test ban treaty. Stennis announced his opposition to the treaty on the Senate floor, arguing that its enactment would lead to military disadvantages. The opposition was viewed as denting hopes of the Kennedy administration to be met with minimal disagreement during the treaty's appearance before the Senate.

In 1964, Stennis voted against the Civil Rights Act, and, in 1965, he voted against the Voting Rights Act. Mississippi at the time had the largest percentage of black citizens of any state in the union (42%).

In 1966, Stennis was initiated as an honorary member of the Delta Lambda chapter (Mississippi State) of Alpha Kappa Psi fraternity.

In June 1967, Stennis announced that the Senate Ethics Committee would give "early preliminary consideration" to misconduct charges against Senator Edward V. Long of Missouri.

Stennis wrote the first Senate ethics code, and was the first chairman of the Senate Ethics Committee. In August 1965, Stennis protested the Johnson administration's emergency supplemental appropriation request for the Vietnam War. In August 1967, Stennis advocated for an expansion of bombing North Vietnam to hasten what he believed would be the war's conclusion, adding that either restrictions or a pause could be a mistake. In July 1969, Stennis proposed dividing South Vietnam into two zones and one would be used for the United States to attempt ending the war. In December, Stennis supported the creation of a special commission by President Richard Nixon with the intent of investigating alleged Vietnamese civilian slayings at the hands of American soldiers.

In July 1968, Stennis served as floor manager of a bill intended to ease congestion that had throttled American airports in recent days by providing increased equipment and personnel, publicly saying the legislation had been put off for too long.

In 1969, Stennis introduced the Nixon administration's proposal for a draft lottery that would subject all potential draftees to a one-year period where they could be called, Stennis saying that studies would be conducted to see about hearings on the matter in 1970, ahead of the then-current law expiring in 1971. An aide for the senator confirmed his support for the administration's policy.

=== 1970s ===
In January 1970, Stennis stated his intent to call on presidential candidates in the upcoming presidential election to visit states outside of the South and tell parents, "I'll do to your schools what we've done to the schools in Mississippi, Alabama and Louisiana if I'm elected President" predicting any candidate who did so would be defeated. He viewed the upholding of de facto segregation — i.e. segregation via demographics — in the North as an unfair double standard against the outlawing of de jure segregation — i.e. segregation by law — in the South. Stennis subsequently submitted an amendment to an education funding bill that would implement uniform desegregation standards federally.

On February 12, White House Press Secretary Ronald L. Ziegler said President Nixon was in favor of the North and the South being treated equally on the issue of segregation, refusing to interpret his remarks as an endorsement of the Stennis desegregation amendment. Several days later, on February 18, the Senate voted 56–36 in favor of the Stennis amendment, Stennis afterward stating that the vote was "a landmark ... a new gateway ... a turning point." Stennis admitted he did not expect a difference in the temperament of the South, but that it could potentially lead to the North understanding the importance of the issue to southerners in having to maintain the same policy. After the amendment was removed in the conference report, on April 1, Stennis and Connecticut Senator Abraham Ribicoff attempted to recommit the bill back to conference with the amendment added back in; this time, the Senate rejected it in a 32–43 vote. In May, Stennis opined that the Supreme Court had dodged its duty by passing on the question of the legality or illegality of segregated schools outside of the South. Stennis said the question "must and should be decided as promptly as possible because a political decision is being made to continue the integration efforts in the South but leave the other areas of the country virtually untouched." In June, as the Senate passed a $4.8 billion education bill, it also defeated an amendment by Stennis to strike certain restrictions in an amendment by Senator Jacob K. Javits for aid to desegregating schools.

In February 1970, Stennis was named as one of the members of Congress to sit on a subcommittee created to study whether the United States needed another nuclear‐powered aircraft carrier priced at $640 million.

In 1971, Stennis sponsored a measure to enforce school desegregation laws in areas where segregation had been caused by residential patterns and in communities where segregation had been sanctioned by law. Stennis said the measure would eliminate what he called a double standard where Southern schools were forced to integrate their communities or face a loss of federal aid while Northern schools were allowed to remain segregated. The policy, noted for its similarity to the amendment sponsored by Stennis the previous year, was passed in the Senate on April 22 in a 44 to 34 vote.

In May 1971, Deputy Secretary of Defense David Packard sent a letter to Stennis concerning an amendment by Harold Hughes to the draft extension bill, warning that the bill could lead to base closings and serious economic problems.

In July 1972, Stennis said it was essential that Congress appropriate $20.5 million for the funding of military supplies and research to meet the basic requirements for the national defense program.

In January 1973, Stennis was shot twice, in the left side of his chest and left thigh, outside his Washington home by two black teenagers, Tyrone and John Marshall. The assailants robbed him of his wallet, a watch, and twenty-five cents. After robbing Stennis, the assailants told him "Now we're gonna shoot you anyway."

On January 23, 1974, sources disclosed that Stennis had met with Chairman of the Joint Chiefs of Staff Thomas H. Moorer for discussions on military snooping in the White House allegations, a Moorer spokesman confirming the meeting but downplaying it as "a routine courtesy call traditionally made in the opening days of a Congressional session".

On February 9, Stennis met privately with Charles Radford, a member of the United States Navy who admitted removing documents from the files of Henry Kissinger in addition to delivering them to the Pentagon. After the meeting's conclusion, Stennis said Radford "was cooperative fully and I have no complaints about him".

In April, Stennis attended the Annual Convention of the Mississippi Economic Council at the Mississippi State Coliseum in Jackson, Mississippi. President Nixon said "no State in the Union is represented by men in the Congress of the United States who more vigorously speak up for their States and for the Nation than has the State of Mississippi" and Stennis would be among those "when they write profiles in courage".

In May 1974, amid the Senate's voting to approve a bill increasing public access to Government information and documents, Stennis opposed an amendment by Maine Senator Edmund Muskie that would have deleted some guidelines for federal judges involving classified information, on the grounds that they were "flirting here with things that can be deadly and dangerous to our national welfare". The amendment passed 56 to 29.

In November 1974, Stennis announced his intent to advocate for the creation of a congressional fact‐finding committee to investigate the possibility of a conspiracy being behind price disparities.

In March 1976, amid the Senate voting unanimously to seat Henry Bellmon, Stennis was one of nine Democrats to vote alongside Republicans to put aside a motion declaring the Senate unable to determine a winner and the seat would require a special election to fill the vacancy. Later that month, Wisconsin Senator William Proxmire requested Stennis delay action on the nomination of Albert Hall as Assistant Secretary of the Air Force. In May, Stennis and Texan John Tower cosponsored a measure to remove the Select Committee on Intelligence's legislative jurisdiction over Defense Department intelligence operations, the amendment being defeated 63 to 31. In June 1976, Stennis joined a coalition of Democrats endorsing Georgia Governor Jimmy Carter for the presidency. The New York Times assessed Stennis and Eastland as jointly "trying to pull Mississippi out for Mr. Carter" in their first campaign for a national Democrat in decades.

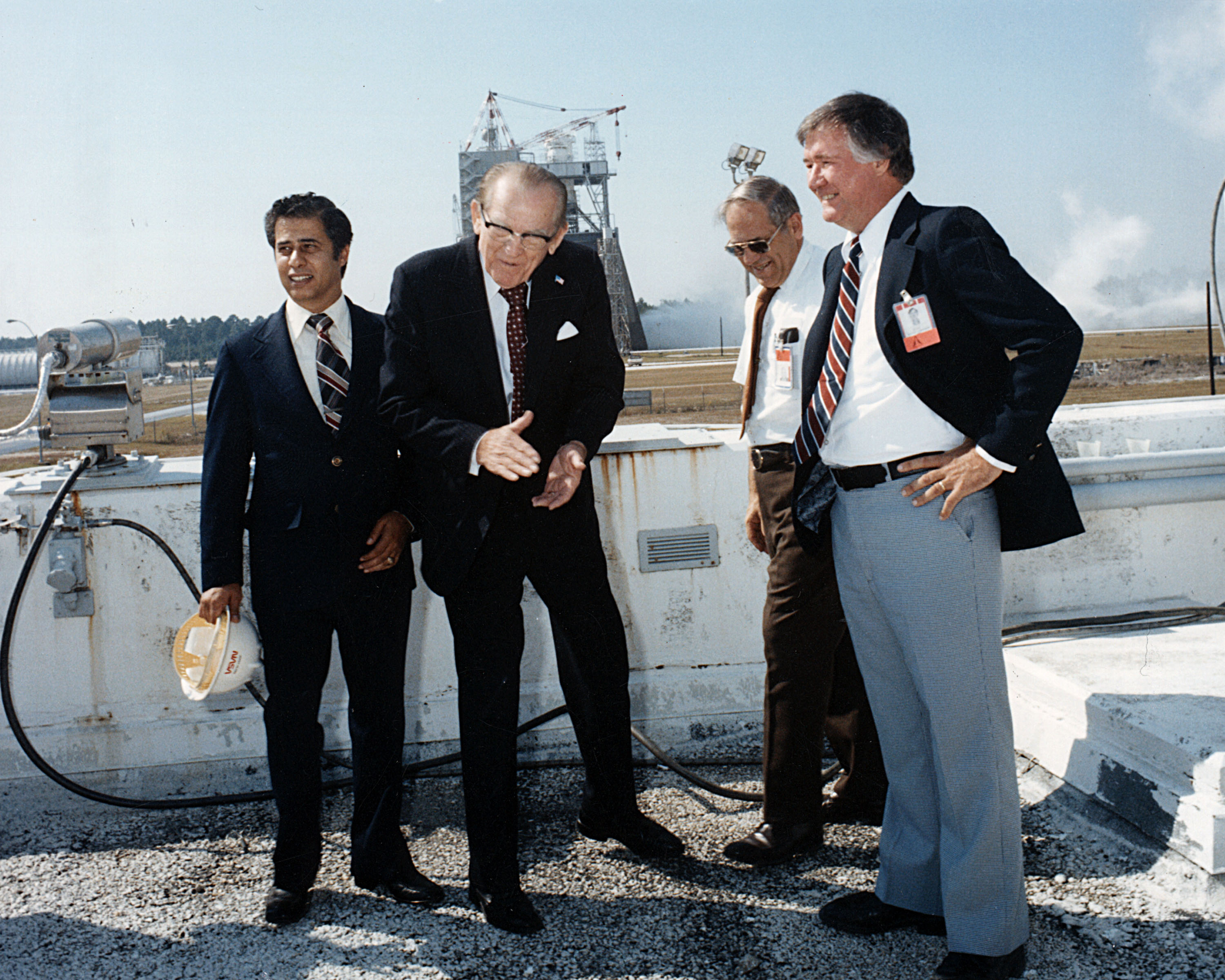
Stennis celebrating a space shuttle engine test in 1978

In February 1977, after President Jimmy Carter selected Paul Warnke as his nominee for Director of the Arms Control and Disarmament Agency, Stennis announced that Warnke had agreed to testify before the Armed Services Committee. On April 16, President Carter announced his approval for full or substantial funding of the Tennessee–Tombigbee Waterway. The New York Times wrote that Carter's approval had prevented him from "having to fight with" Stennis, Eastland, and John J. Sparkman. In June, Stennis authorized a request by Colorado Democrat Gary Hart to delay hearings on the promotion of Donn A. Starry to United States Army Training and Doctrine Command; Starry was later confirmed to the position. In July, President Carter sent Stennis a letter stating his decision on deployment would come after he received reports on the neutron bomb from the Pentagon and the Arms Control and Disarmament Agency. After the November death of Arkansas Senator John L. McClellan, Stennis was seen as a potential chairman of the Defense Appropriations Subcommittee in the event Warren Magnuson did not attempt to take the position himself.

In April 1978, after President Carter announced a halt on production of neutron weapons, Stennis was known to be one of the senators dissatisfied with the decision. In July, Stennis introduced an amendment to the Endangered Species Act which would authorize any head of a government agency to be able to decide whether the individual's agency had a project that outweighed the importance of preserving a species. The amendment was defeated 76 to 22.

In September 1978, after the House voted to approve a $37 billion defense spending bill, Stennis made moves toward producing a new bill that maintained similar attributes to the House-passed measure with the exception of the carrier. Defense Secretary Harold Brown issued a statement a short time afterward praising Stennis and Representatives Melvin Price and George H. Mahon as "dedicated and patriotic Americans", rhetoric that was seen as matching the tone "evidently designed to repair the rift the veto opened between the White House and defense leaders in Congress" used by President Carter in his own statement. In October, the Carter administration disclosed that President Carter had reversed his choice to not approve construction of the large nuclear‐powered aircraft carrier. Carter was said to have personally assured Stennis he would not veto the carrier.

==== Vietnam ====
In April 1970, in response to the Nixon administration's choice to back efforts by the South Vietnamese in Cambodia, senators made moves toward ending funding for American military aid there. Stennis and Michigan Senator Robert P. Griffin described the operation as one limited in scale and with the purpose of destroying sanctuaries of the North Vietnamese and Vietcong in Cambodia on the South Vietnam border. In July, Stennis advocated for the United States adopting an Anti-ballistic missile (ABM) system to safeguard against Soviet SS‐9 intercontinental ballistics missiles and called on fellow senators to recall "the grim fact of rapidly increasing Russian strategic forces which could place this country in jeopardy in the years ahead." In August, as the Senate voted to bar the United States from paying larger allowances to allied troops in Vietnam than it pays to American soldiers, Stennis said he was impressed with the legislation and that he would be in favor if "some adjustment can be made consistent with our honor". Stennis also pledged to try arranging an agreement between the two chambers on the final military procurement bill. Stennis furthered that the United States "would have to observe any commitments it might have already made, and that some delicacy might be necessary since American forces are leaving Vietnam." In September, the Senate voted on the McGovern–Hatfield Amendment, a proposal that would have required the end of military operations in Vietnam by December 31, 1970, and a complete withdrawal of American forces halfway through the next year. Stennis argued the amendment was constitutional and that Congress had "the sole power to appropriate money" but opposed it on the grounds that it would harm the American negotiating position. The amendment was defeated in a 55–39 vote.

In May 1971, the Senate rejected legislation designed to prohibit assignments of draftees to combat in Vietnam after the end of the year without consent on the part of the draftees. Stennis said the legislation would have caused the creation of two classes of soldiers where one group could fight and the other could not while arguing that any army unit "would be rendered inoperative if each man's record had to be reviewed by the commanders before they acted in an emergency".

In March 1972, John D. Lavelle was relieved of duty as commander of the Seventh Air Force in Southeast Asia due to alleged misconduct over bombing missions in Vietnam, President Nixon announcing the appointment of Creighton W. Abrams as Chief of Staff of the U.S. Army by Nixon in June. A week later, during a Senate floor speech, Stennis announced a full hearing would be conducted around the pending retirement of Lavelle, his announcement coming in light of new testimony linking Creighton W. Abrams to an unauthorized bombing of North Vietnam. The move by Stennis was viewed as serving "to complicate further an already intricate series of changes at the top of the Army's command structure". On September 13, Stennis said there was a conflict in the testimony of Abrams and Lavelle regarding the intricacies of the strikes, specifying the difference in who was behind them and their planning. This difference, he stated, would need further inspection from the committee, declining to specify the particular conflict in their account while speaking to newsmen. Later that month, Lavelle sent Stennis a letter detailing his activities and other information pertaining to the case.

In April 1973, Stennis, in a statement drafted at Walter Reed Army Hospital while he was still recovering from gunshot injuries, called for legislation that would prevent the President from restoring American troops in Vietnam without congressional backing. The Senate, in a vote 71–18 vote, approved a similar measure in July, barring the president from being able to commit American armed forces to future foreign hostilities without the consent of Congress. Stennis sent a letter to Edmund Muskie advising that cluttering the "war powers bill with other matters" would give the measure the possibility of overriding a veto.

In May 1974, Stennis announced the Senate Armed Services Committee had approved $21.8 billion in weapons production and research for the upcoming fiscal year, a 5.6 percent decrease in the funding requested by the Nixon administration.

==== Other foreign policy issues ====
In May 1970, Stennis argued against an amendment by Frank Church and John Sherman Cooper that if enacted would prohibit funds for retaining American troops in Cambodia, telling Senate Foreign Relations Committee Chairman J. William Fulbright he did not understand how a president could select a date without assurance there would be no reversals in battle. After Stennis recalled President Nixon's having made an estimate on when the U.S. would exit the conflict, Fulbright said Stennis had confirmed his belief that Nixon did not mean it when he said American involvement in Cambodia would be over by July 1. Stennis then charged Fulbright with putting words in his mouth.

On May 12, 1971, Stennis introduced legislation curbing the ability of the president to commence war without congressional consent. Stennis called the choice to declare war "too big a decision for one mind to make and too awesome a responsibility for one man to bear" and that he was aiming for Congress to give consideration to the idea posed in his measure for roughly a year before drafting any legislation. The introduction of the measure was viewed "as one of those potentially historic moments when the action of one man can turn the tide of policy". In June, the Senate turned down an amendment by Massachusetts Senator Ted Kennedy that would have enabled young men registering for the draft have the right to lawyer and hearings in the style of a courtroom before their local draft boards. With multiple amendments still needing to be voted on by the chamber, Senate Majority Leader Mike Mansfield afterward announced that Stennis, Hugh Scott, and himself would present a petition to end a debate.

On July 31, 1972, Stennis announced his support for the Strategic Arms Limitation Treaty.

In September 1973, the White House disclosed President Nixon had written Stennis, Senate Majority Leader Mike Mansfield, and Senate Minority Leader Hugh Scott to urge Senate approval of the full weapons budget requested by his administration. Days later, the Senate rejected an amendment by Mansfield requiring a reduction in American troops abroad in a vote of 51 to 44 after initially voting in favor of it. Along with Texan Lloyd Bentsen, Stennis was noted as one of two Democratic senators to have backed the Nixon administration who were absent during the first vote.

In September 1974, Stennis argued in favor of the $82.5 billion defense appropriations bill the Senate sent to the White House, a measure noted for having a $4.4 billion decrease in the amount requested by the Ford administration for the 1975 fiscal year, saying it was not reducing "the muscle of America's military".

In May 1977, Washington Senator Henry M. Jackson named Stennis as one of the senators who was part of a bipartisan attempt to develop, in reference to the SALT II treaty, "the kind of agreement that ... will stabilize the situation in the world." By May 1979, The New York Times wrote that Stennis was one of the moderate senators who would swing the vote on the SALT II treaty and along with West Virginia Senator Robert Byrd was viewed as "possibly timing their decisions to influence other waverers". On June 19, Stennis, Robert Byrd, and Frank Church consented to the Senate Armed Services Committee holding separate hearings on SALT II on July 23, allowing the Senate Foreign Relations committee to have two weeks as the only committee reviewing the treaty.

At the end of January 1978, Stennis announced his opposition to the Panama Canal treaties, citing their causing the U.S. to withdrawal from the Canal Zone too rapidly, a move that he furthered would leave the U.S. "highly uncertain what is going to happen down there".

In July 1978, the Senate voted to approve the construction of a nuclear-powered aircraft carrier and military spending bill authorizing the Pentagon to spend $36 billion for weapons. Stennis stated his hope and prediction "that this will be the last bill that will have a carrier of this type".

In September 1979, Stennis held a private meeting with U.S. Secretary of State Cyrus Vance over the Soviet brigade in Cuba. Stennis also met with President Carter for a discussion on future arms spending which failed to resolve a disagreement over budget increases that could potentially determine the fate of the proposed treaty to limit strategic arms. Stennis said after the meeting he believed the senators had made some progress with Carter. Later that month, on September 27, President Carter signed the Panama Canal Act of 1979 into law, saying in part, "I particularly want to thank Senators Stennis and Levin and Congressmen Murphy, Bowen, and Derwinski for their outstanding leadership in resolving the many difficult issues embodied in this act." In October, during a committee hearing, Stennis stated his opposition to suggestions recommending that the Senate postpone action on the strategic arms treaty with the Soviet Union until the following year, and that he believed the treaty debate in the Senate should continue on the ground that the issue would likely be more clear at the present time than it possibly would months later. Stennis, by then considered an influential member of the Senate to newer members in both parties, was seen as "useful to President Carter in trying to stave off attempts to delay or kill the pact". In December, the Senate Armed Services Committee agreed on a formula for making public a report condemning the pending nuclear arms treaty with the Soviet Union on the condition that the report would not make any specific recommendation to the Senate while concluding that the treaty was not in the "national security interests" of the United States without undergoing major changes. Making the report public was seen as a victory to opponents of the treaty but also by Senate aides as having a larger impact on Stennis's authority, the aides citing Stennis finally having bent to pressure from senators opposed to the treaty over issuing the report and possibly weakening his control over the committee.

==== Watergate ====
In October 1973, during the Watergate scandal, the Nixon administration proposed the Stennis Compromise, wherein the hard-of-hearing Stennis would listen to the contested Oval Office tapes and report on their contents, but this plan went nowhere. Time magazine ran a picture of John Stennis that read: "Technical Assistance Needed". The picture had his hand cupped around his ear.

In January 1974, during a telephone interview, Stennis indicated his intent to investigate on allegations of military spying in the White House, saying he did not expect the White House to intervene with the inquiry and confirmed he was not familiar with the spying until news reports. After Nixon's resignation, Stennis opposed pursuing criminal charges, arguing that his leaving office was enough punishment. The resignation was followed a month later by President Ford's pardon of Nixon, a move Stennis and other conservative Democrats favored.

==== 1976 re-election campaign ====
In January 1974, Stennis said his health was without complications (from the shooting in 1973) and that he would be running for another term in 1976. Stennis was re-elected without opposition.

=== 1980s ===
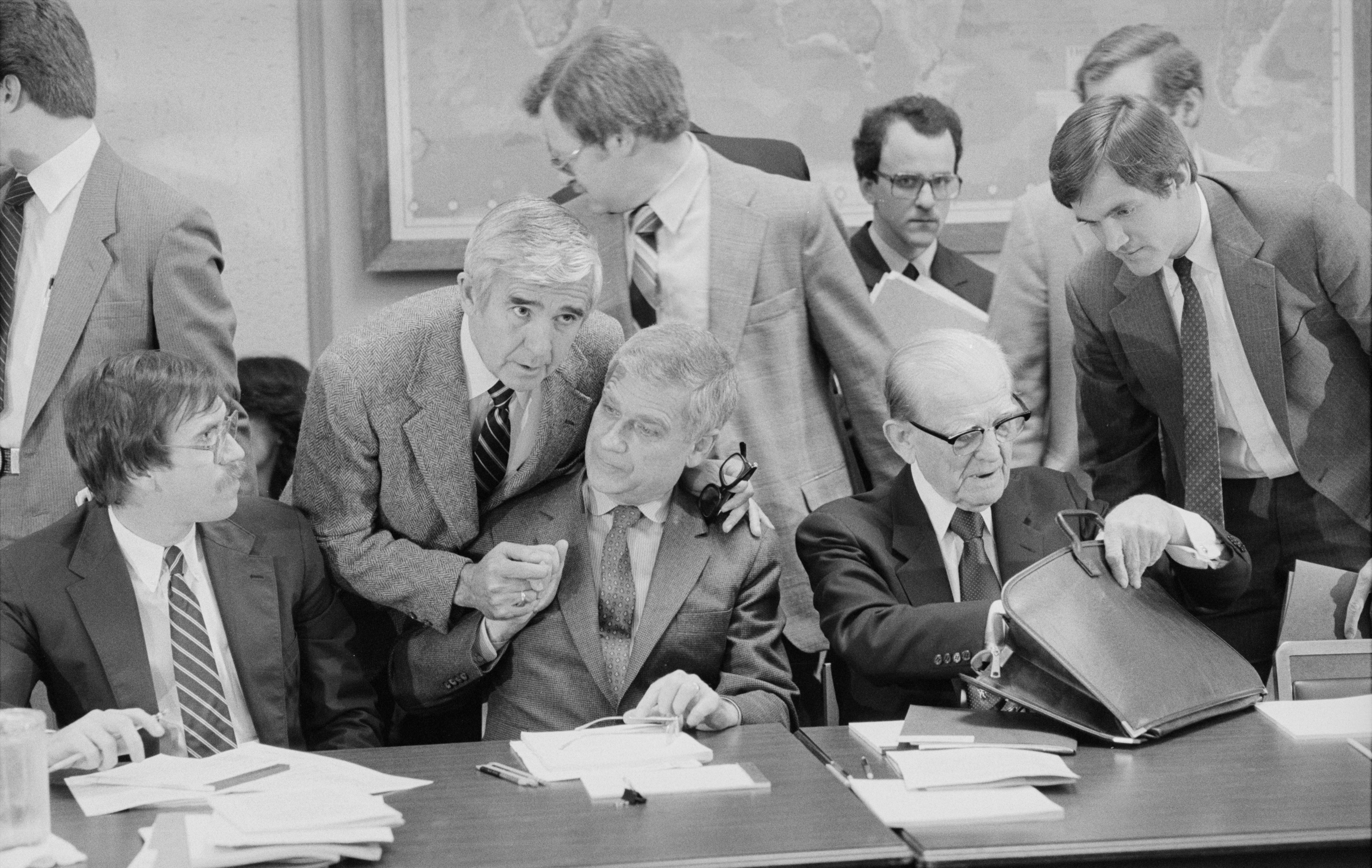
Paul Laxalt, Mark Hatfield, and Stennis before a conference on the Emergency Jobs Act of 1983

In November 1980, Defense Secretary Harold Brown sent two letters to Stennis complaining that the House of Representatives had added $7.5 billion in new programs and deleted $5 billion in administration programs for a net increase of $2.5 billion and urging the Senate Appropriations Subcommittee on Defense instead approve the administration's budget. The Senate instead approved $161 billion, $6 billion more than what the administration proposed and $3.5 million more than approved in the House.

In early 1981, Stennis was replaced by John Tower as Chairman of the Senate Armed Services Committee. Virginia Senator John Warner said: "With no disrespect to Senator John Stennis, our former chairman, John Tower will provide a more vigorous thrust to the committee."

In spring 1981, Stennis predicted there would be larger opposition to military spending in the event of new proposals in favor of more funds being allocated. The New York Times referred back to Stennis in July when Senator Mark Hatfield conducted his first detailed foray into military spending as chairman of the Senate Appropriations Committee. In a Senate floor speech, Stennis warned that "great pressure" to an increase would persist with continued showing of a deficit in the federal budget and Americans would stop supporting the military and its budget "if our military forces do not show real improvement without damaging the health of our economy".

In June 1982, Stennis was renominated for a seventh term, defeating Charles Pittman and radio station owner Colon Johnston by a large margin. Stennis faced political operative Haley Barbour in the general election. Barbour's supporters poked fun at Stennis's age, an issue the senator made self-deprecating comments about. President Ronald Reagan met with Stennis during the general election and promised he would not campaign for Barbour, despite Reagan's taping an ad for Barbour attacking Stennis for his age.

Stennis lost his left leg to cancer in 1984 and subsequently used a wheelchair.

Stennis was named President pro tempore of the United States Senate during the 100th Congress (1987–1989). During his Senate career he chaired, at different times, the Select Committee on Standards and Conduct, and the Armed Services, and Appropriations Committees.

Stennis opposed President Ronald Reagan's 1987 nomination of Robert Bork to the U.S. Supreme Court. On October 23, 1987, Stennis voted with all but two Democrats, and six Republicans against Bork's nomination, which was defeated by a vote of 42–58.

In February 1988, along with Robert Byrd and John Melcher, Stennis was one of three senators to attend the traditional reading of the farewell address of President George Washington by North Carolina Senator Terry Sanford. That same month, he was one of twelve Democrats to support the Reagan administration-backed $43 million aid to Nicaraguan rebels.

In June 1988, Stennis voted against a bill authorizing the use of the death penalty on drug dealers convicted of murder.

A dinner in honor of Stennis was held on June 23, 1988, in the Sheraton Ballroom of the Sheraton Washington Hotel. President Reagan delivered an address praising Stennis for his service in the Senate and announced "as an expression of the Nation's gratitude for the public service of the man we honor tonight, the Navy's next nuclear-powered aircraft carrier, CVN-74, will be christened the U.S.S. John C. Stennis [sic]."

=== Civil rights record ===
Based on his voting record, Stennis was an ardent supporter of racial segregation, with a 2007 article in The Atlantic calling him "one of twentieth century America's most admired white supremacists." In the 1950s and 1960s, he vigorously opposed the Voting Rights Act, the Civil Rights Act of 1964, and the Civil Rights Act of 1968; he signed the Southern Manifesto of 1956, supporting filibuster tactics to block or delay passage in all cases.

Earlier, as a prosecutor, he sought the conviction and execution of three black sharecroppers whose murder confessions had been extracted by torture, including flogging, hanging, and strangulation. The convictions were overturned by the U.S. Supreme Court in the landmark case of Brown v. Mississippi (1936) which banned the use of evidence obtained by torture. The transcript of the trial indicated Stennis was fully aware the suspects had been tortured.

Stennis told Chief of Naval Operations Admiral Elmo Zumwalt that black people "had come down from the trees a lot later than we did."

Later in his political career, Stennis supported one piece of civil rights legislation, the 1982 extension of the Voting Rights Act, which passed in the Senate by an 85–8 vote. A year later, he voted against establishing Martin Luther King, Jr. Day as a federal holiday. Stennis campaigned for Mike Espy in 1986 during Espy's successful bid to become the first black Congressman from the state since the end of Reconstruction.

== Retirement and death ==
In 1982, his last election, Stennis easily defeated Republican Haley Barbour. Declining to run for re-election in 1988, Stennis retired in 1989, having never lost an election. He took a teaching post at his alma mater, Mississippi State University, working there until his death in Jackson, Mississippi, at the age of 93. One of his student aides at Mississippi State University, David Dallas, wrote and performed a one-man play about his time with the senator.

At the time of Stennis's retirement, his continuous tenure of 41 years and 2 months in the Senate was second only to that of Carl Hayden. (It has since been surpassed by Robert Byrd, Strom Thurmond, Ted Kennedy, Daniel Inouye, Patrick Leahy, Orrin Hatch, Chuck Grassley, and Mitch McConnell, leaving Stennis tenth).

Stennis died on April 23, 1995, at St. Dominic–Jackson Memorial Hospital in Jackson, Mississippi, at the age of 93. He is buried at Pine Crest Cemetery in Kemper County.

== Naming honors ==
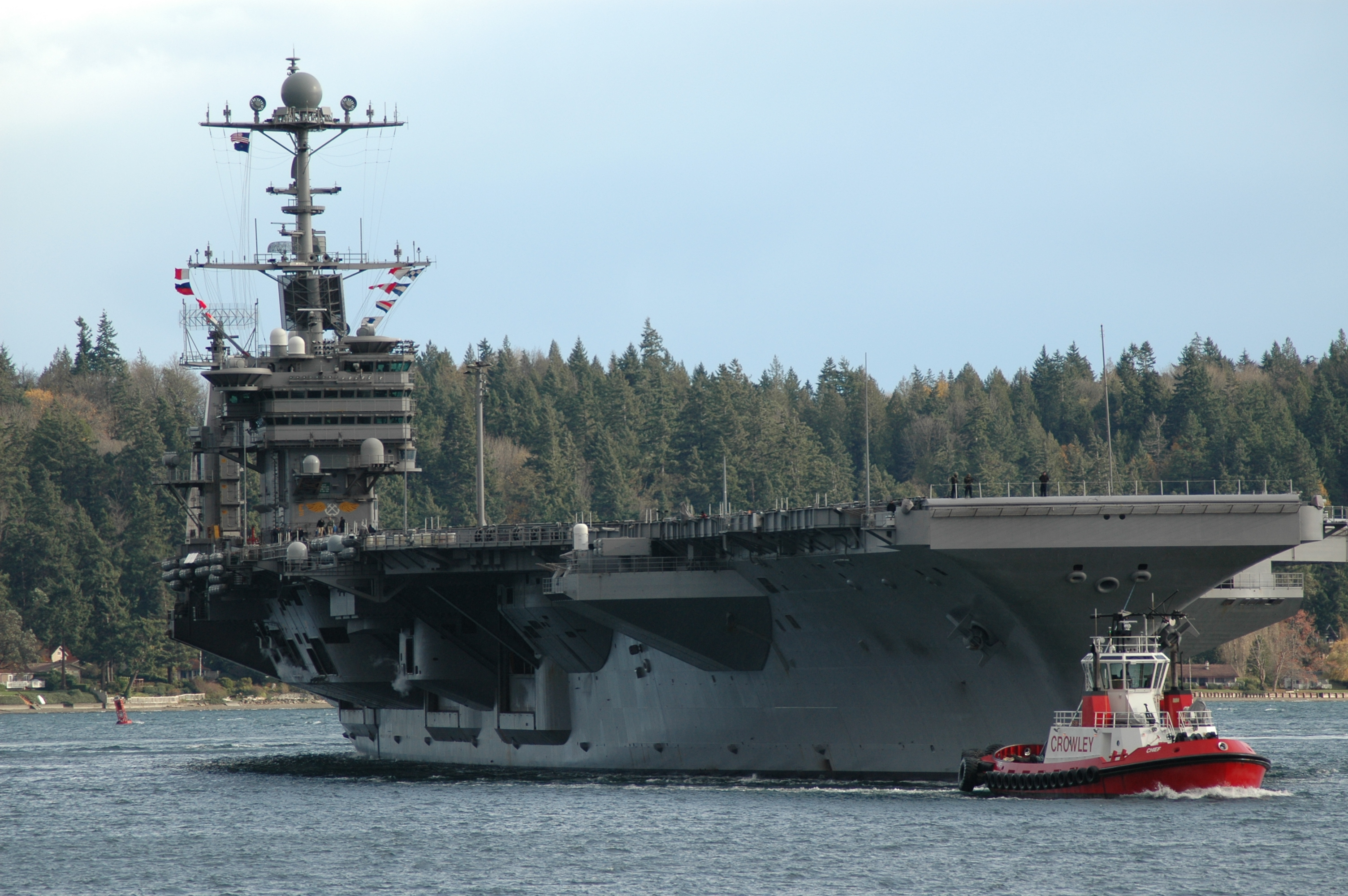
The USS John C. Stennis

- Interstate 110, officially known as the John C. Stennis–Joseph A. Creel Parkway
- John C. Stennis Space Center, a major rocket testing facility for NASA
- John C. Stennis Center for Public Service Training and Development
- John C. Stennis National Student Congress of the National Forensic League
- John C. Stennis Lock and Dam, part of the Tennessee-Tombigbee Waterway
- John C. Stennis Institute of Government
- John C. Stennis Scholarship in Political Science
- John C. Stennis Vocational Complex
- USS John C. Stennis Aircraft carrier and Carrier Strike Group
- John C. Stennis Oral History Collection at Mississippi State University in Starkville
- John C. Stennis Memorial Hospital in Dekalb, Mississippi
- Stennis International Airport

== See also ==
- List of members of the United States Congress killed or wounded in office

== Notes and references ==
- Stennis Center for Public Service. "Tribute to John C. Stennis". Retrieved June 16, 2005.

Party political offices
Preceded by Theodore G. Bilbo	Democratic nominee for U.S. Senator from Mississippi (Class 1); 1947, 1952, 1958, 1964, 1970, 1976, 1982	Succeeded by Wayne Dowdy
U.S. Senate
Preceded by Theodore Bilbo	U.S. Senator (Class 1) from Mississippi; 1947–1989; Served alongside: James Eastland, Thad Cochran	Succeeded by Trent Lott
New office	Chair of the Senate Standards Committee; 1965–1974	Succeeded by Howard Cannon
Preceded by Richard Russell	Chair of the Senate Armed Services Committee; 1969–1981	Succeeded by John Tower
Preceded by John Tower	Ranking Member of the Senate Armed Services Committee; 1981–1983	Succeeded by Scoop Jackson
Preceded by William Proxmire	Ranking Member of the Senate Appropriations Committee; 1983–1987	Succeeded by Mark Hatfield
Preceded by Mark Hatfield	Chair of the Senate Appropriations Committee; 1987–1989	Succeeded by Robert Byrd
Honorary titles
Preceded by Warren Magnuson	Dean of the U.S. Senate; 1981–1989	Succeeded by Strom Thurmond
Preceded by Milton Young	Oldest United States Senator; 1981–1989	Succeeded by Strom Thurmond
Political offices
Preceded by Strom Thurmond	President pro tempore of the U.S. Senate; 1987–1989	Succeeded by Robert Byrd
