= 1964 United States Senate election in Mississippi =

1964 U.S. Senate Democratic primary in Mississippi
- June 2, 1964
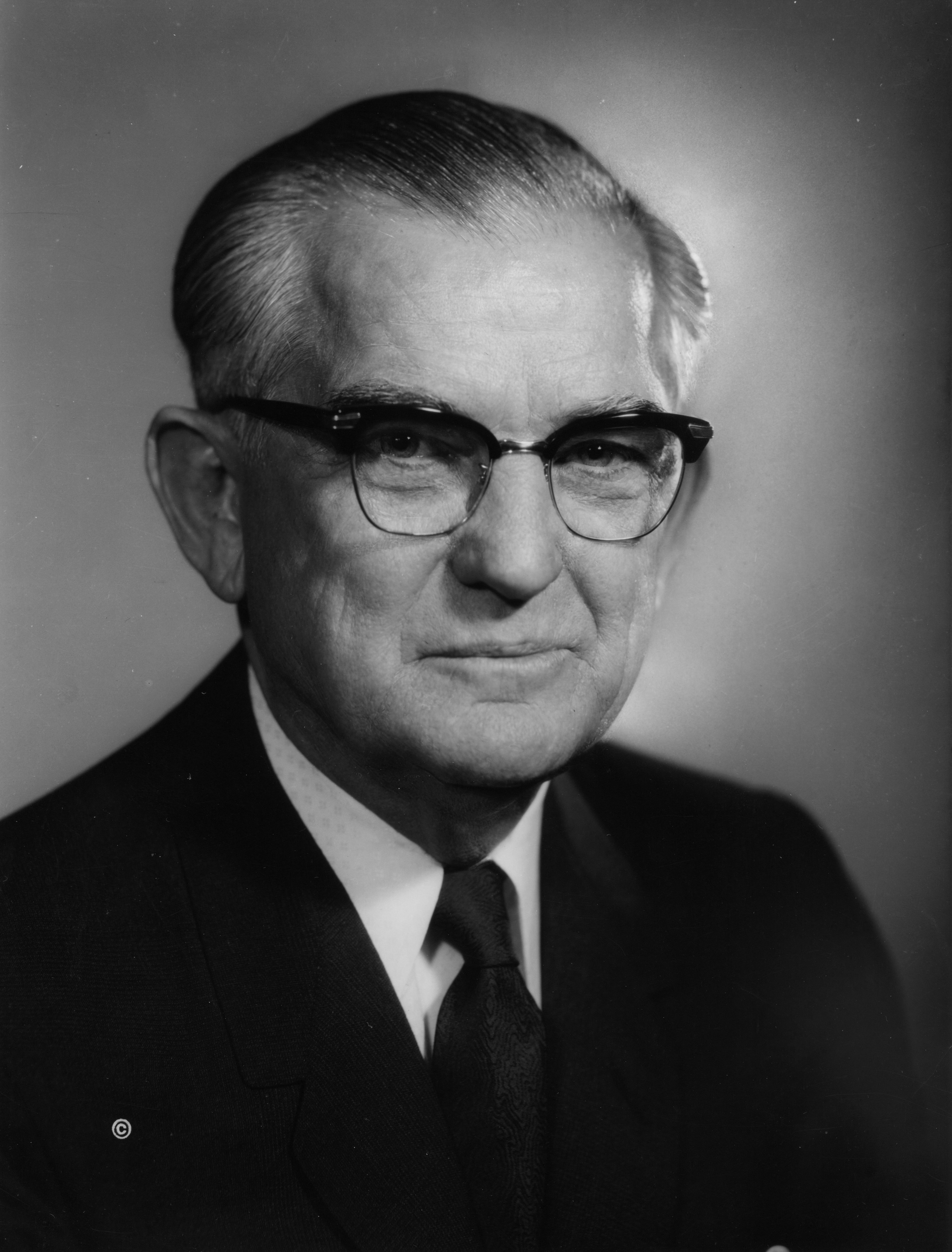

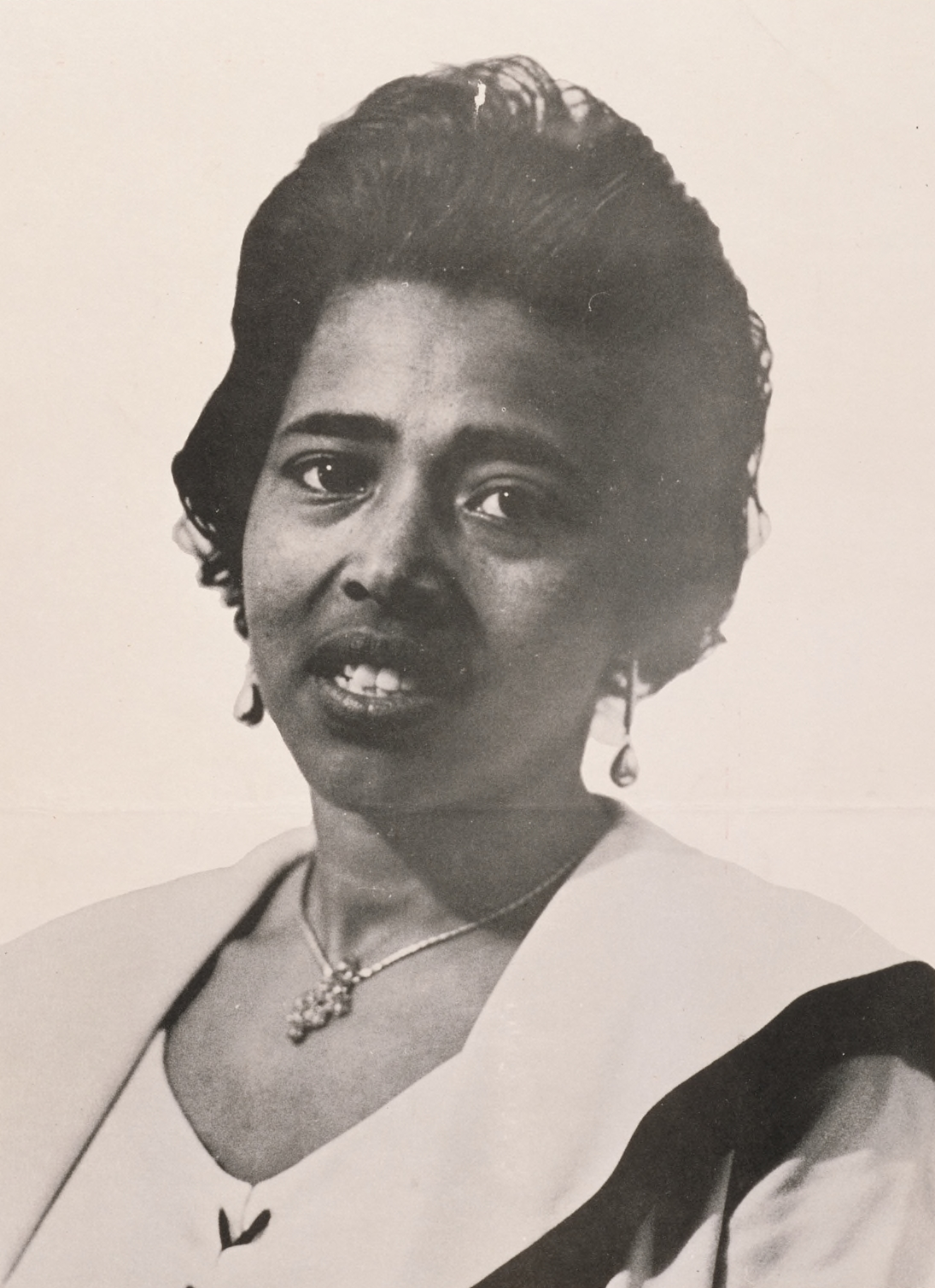
| Nominee | John C. Stennis | Victoria Gray Adams |
| Party | Democratic | Democratic |
| Popular vote | 173,764 | 4,703 |
| Percentage | 97.37% | 2.64% |
- County results Stennis: >90%
U.S. senator before election
John C. Stennis
Democratic
Elected U.S. Senator
John C. Stennis
Democratic

The 1964 United States Senate election in Mississippi was held on November 3, 1964. Incumbent Democratic U.S. Senator John C. Stennis won re-election to his fourth term.

Because Stennis was unopposed in the general election, his victory in the June 2 primary was tantamount to election. He defeated civil rights activist Victoria Gray Adams, a member of the Mississippi Freedom Democratic Party in a landslide, even as Republican Barry Goldwater defeated incumbent President Lyndon Johnson by 78 points in the concurrent presidential race.

== Democratic primary ==
=== Candidates ===
- Victoria Gray Adams, civil rights activist and member of the Mississippi Freedom Democratic Party
- John C. Stennis, incumbent U.S. Senator

=== Results ===
1964 Democratic U.S. Senate primary
| Party | Candidate | Votes | % |
|---|---|---|---|
| Democratic | John C. Stennis (incumbent) | 173,764 | 97.37% |
| Democratic | Victoria Gray Adams | 4,703 | 2.64% |
| Total votes | | 178,467 | 100.00% |

== General election ==
=== Results ===
General election results
| Party | Candidate | Votes | % | ±% |
|---|---|---|---|---|
| Democratic | John C. Stennis (incumbent) | 343,364 | 100.00% | Steady |
| Total votes | | 343,364 | 100.00% | |

== See also ==
- 1964 United States Senate elections
