= List of United States senators from Mississippi =

Current delegation

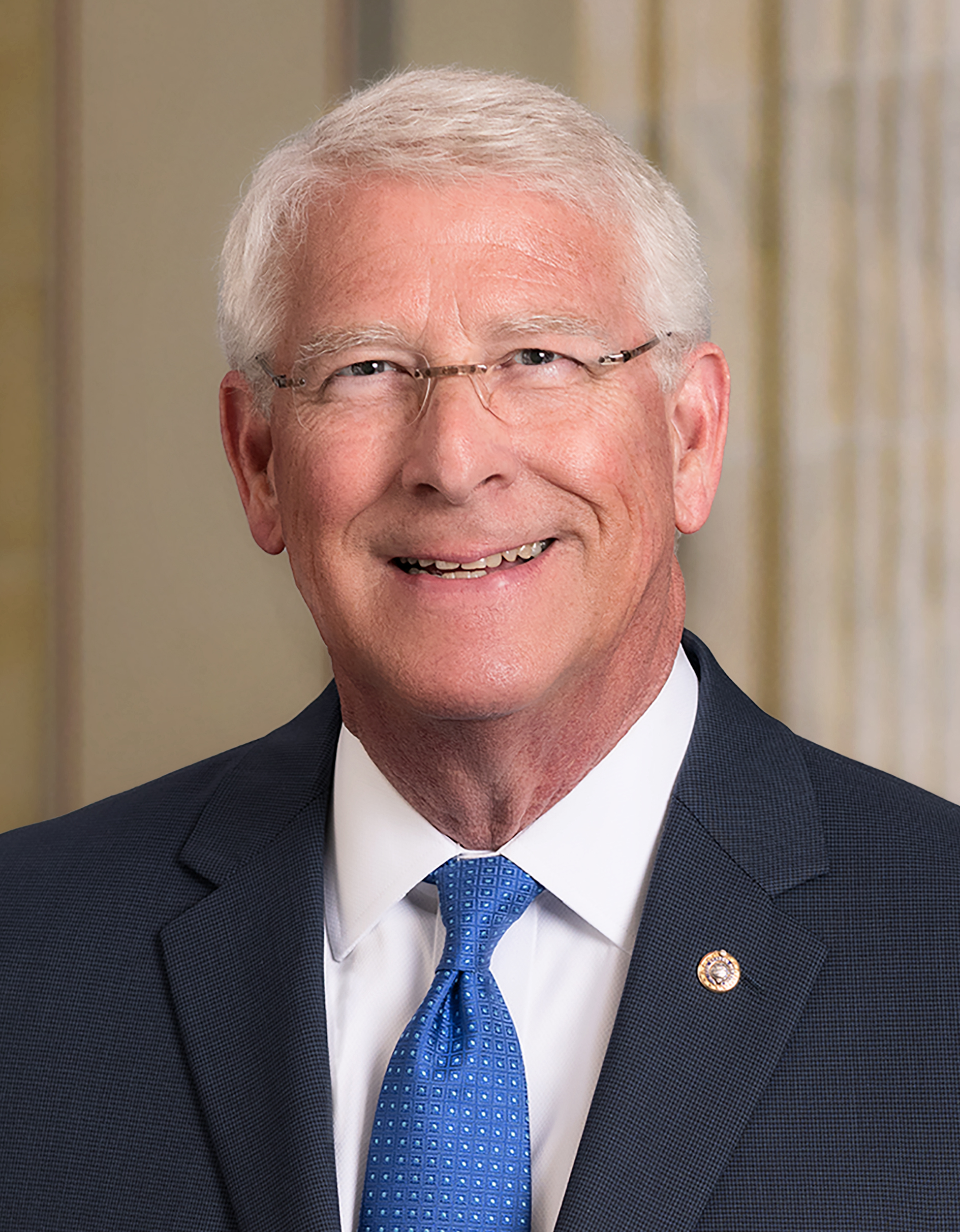
Roger Wicker (R)

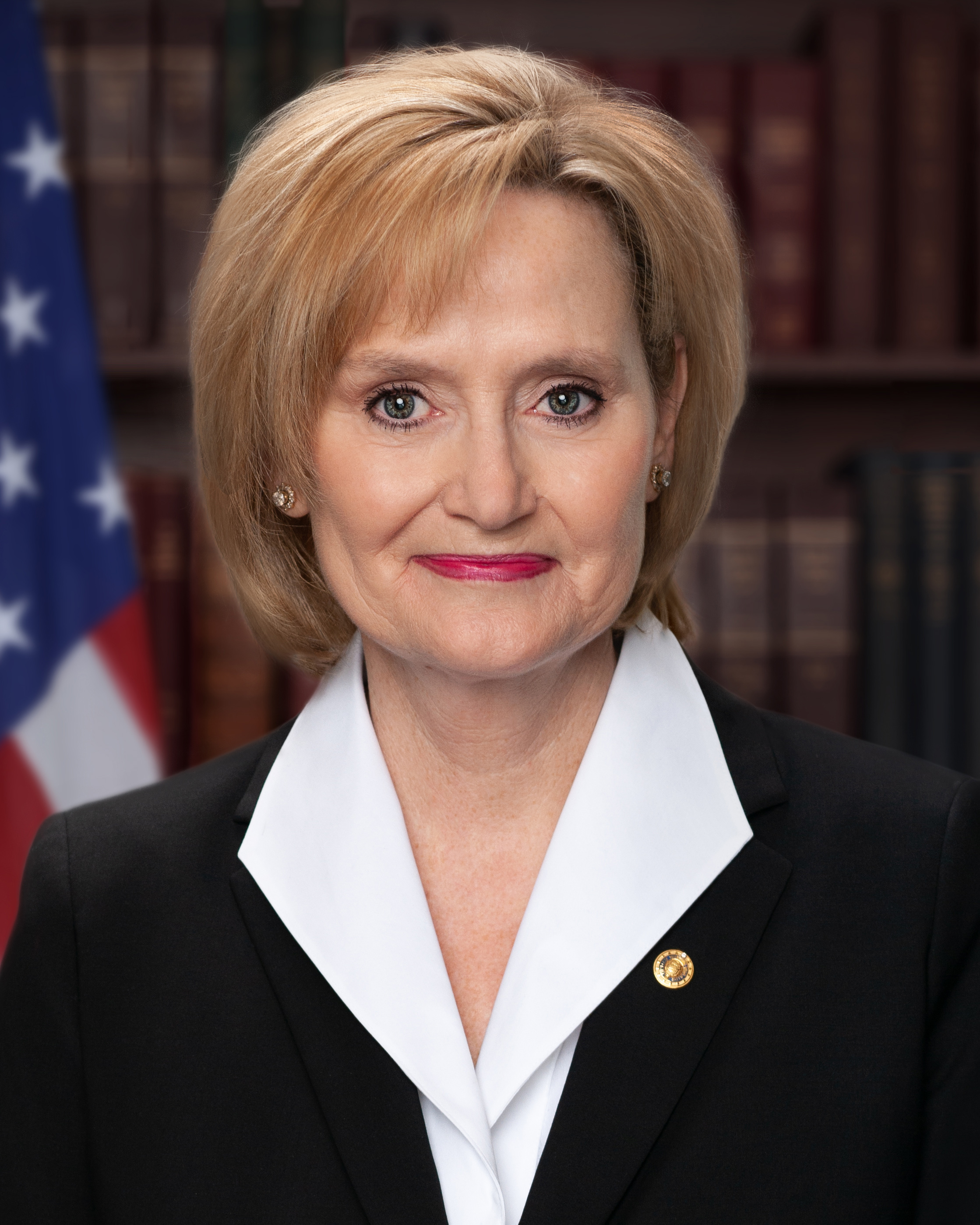
Cindy Hyde-Smith (R)

(ordered by seniority)

Mississippi was admitted to the Union on December 10, 1817, and elects senators to class 1 and class 2. Its current senators are Republicans Cindy Hyde-Smith and Roger Wicker. As of February 2022, 51 people have served as U.S. senators from Mississippi. John C. Stennis was Mississippi's longest-serving senator (1947–1989).

In 2026, Mississippi elected a Democratic Senator for the first time since 1982. Both seats were occupied by the Republicans from 1989 until the election of Democratic candidate Scott Colom won the Class 2 seat.

== List of senators ==
Class 1 Class 1 senators belong to the electoral cycle that most recently had regular elections in 2006, 2012, 2018, and 2024. The next election will be in 2030.						C	Class 2 Class 2 senators belong to the electoral cycle that most recently had regular elections in 2008, 2014, 2020, and 2026. The next election will be in 2032.					
#	Senator	Party	Dates in office	Electoral history	T	C	T	Electoral history	Dates in office	Party	Senator	#
1	Walter Leake (Bay St. Louis)	Democratic- Republican	Dec 10, 1817 – May 15, 1820	Elected in 1817. Resigned.	1	15th	1	Elected in 1817.	Dec 10, 1817 – Mar 3, 1829	Democratic- Republican	Thomas Hill Williams (Washington)	1
1	Walter Leake (Bay St. Louis)	Democratic- Republican	Dec 10, 1817 – May 15, 1820	Elected in 1817. Resigned.	1	16th	1	Elected in 1817.	Dec 10, 1817 – Mar 3, 1829	Democratic- Republican	Thomas Hill Williams (Washington)	1
Vacant			May 15, 1820 – Aug 30, 1820		1	16th	1	Elected in 1817.	Dec 10, 1817 – Mar 3, 1829	Democratic- Republican	Thomas Hill Williams (Washington)	1
2	David Holmes (Washington)	Democratic- Republican	Aug 30, 1820 – Sep 25, 1825	Elected to finish Leake's term.	1	16th	1	Elected in 1817.	Dec 10, 1817 – Mar 3, 1829	Democratic- Republican	Thomas Hill Williams (Washington)	1
2	David Holmes (Washington)	Democratic- Republican	Aug 30, 1820 – Sep 25, 1825	Re-election year unknown. Resigned to become Governor of Mississippi.	2	17th	1	Elected in 1817.	Dec 10, 1817 – Mar 3, 1829	Democratic- Republican	Thomas Hill Williams (Washington)	1
2	David Holmes (Washington)	Democratic- Republican	Aug 30, 1820 – Sep 25, 1825	Re-election year unknown. Resigned to become Governor of Mississippi.	2	18th	2	Re-elected in 1823.	Dec 10, 1817 – Mar 3, 1829	Democratic- Republican	Thomas Hill Williams (Washington)	1
2	David Holmes (Washington)	Jacksonian	Aug 30, 1820 – Sep 25, 1825	Re-election year unknown. Resigned to become Governor of Mississippi.	2	19th	2	Re-elected in 1823.	Dec 10, 1817 – Mar 3, 1829	Jacksonian	Thomas Hill Williams (Washington)	1
Vacant			Sep 25, 1825 – Sep 28, 1825		2	19th	2	Re-elected in 1823.	Dec 10, 1817 – Mar 3, 1829	Jacksonian	Thomas Hill Williams (Washington)	1
3	Powhatan Ellis (Washington)	Jacksonian	Sep 28, 1825 – Jan 28, 1826	Appointed to continue Holmes's term. Lost election to finish Holmes's term.	2	19th	2	Re-elected in 1823.	Dec 10, 1817 – Mar 3, 1829	Jacksonian	Thomas Hill Williams (Washington)	1
4	Thomas Buck Reed (Natchez)	Jacksonian	Jan 28, 1826 – Mar 3, 1827	Elected to finish Holmes's term. Lost election to full term.	2	19th	2	Re-elected in 1823.	Dec 10, 1817 – Mar 3, 1829	Jacksonian	Thomas Hill Williams (Washington)	1
5	Powhatan Ellis (Winchester)	Jacksonian	Mar 4, 1827 – Jul 16, 1832	Election year unknown. Resigned to become a U.S. District Judge.	3	20th	2	Re-elected in 1823.	Dec 10, 1817 – Mar 3, 1829	Jacksonian	Thomas Hill Williams (Washington)	1
5	Powhatan Ellis (Winchester)	Jacksonian	Mar 4, 1827 – Jul 16, 1832	Election year unknown. Resigned to become a U.S. District Judge.	3	21st	3	Elected in 1828. Died.	Mar 4, 1829 – Nov 26, 1829	Jacksonian	Thomas Buck Reed (Natchez)	2
5	Powhatan Ellis (Winchester)	Jacksonian	Mar 4, 1827 – Jul 16, 1832	Election year unknown. Resigned to become a U.S. District Judge.	3	21st	3		Nov 26, 1829 – Jan 6, 1830	Vacant		
5	Powhatan Ellis (Winchester)	Jacksonian	Mar 4, 1827 – Jul 16, 1832	Election year unknown. Resigned to become a U.S. District Judge.	3	21st	3	Elected to finish Reed's term. Died.	Jan 6, 1830 – Jul 2, 1830	Jacksonian	Robert H. Adams (Natchez)	3
5	Powhatan Ellis (Winchester)	Jacksonian	Mar 4, 1827 – Jul 16, 1832	Election year unknown. Resigned to become a U.S. District Judge.	3	21st	3		Jul 2, 1830 – Oct 15, 1830	Vacant		
5	Powhatan Ellis (Winchester)	Jacksonian	Mar 4, 1827 – Jul 16, 1832	Election year unknown. Resigned to become a U.S. District Judge.	3	21st	3	Appointed to continue Reed's term. Elected in 1830 to finish Reed's term. Lost re-election.	Oct 15, 1830 – Mar 3, 1835	Jacksonian	George Poindexter (Wilkinson)	4
5	Powhatan Ellis (Winchester)	Jacksonian	Mar 4, 1827 – Jul 16, 1832	Election year unknown. Resigned to become a U.S. District Judge.	3	22nd	3	Appointed to continue Reed's term. Elected in 1830 to finish Reed's term. Lost re-election.	Oct 15, 1830 – Mar 3, 1835	National; Republican	George Poindexter (Wilkinson)	4
Vacant			Jul 16, 1832 – Nov 12, 1832		3	22nd	3	Appointed to continue Reed's term. Elected in 1830 to finish Reed's term. Lost re-election.	Oct 15, 1830 – Mar 3, 1835	National; Republican	George Poindexter (Wilkinson)	4
6	John Black (Natchez)	Jacksonian	Nov 12, 1832 – Mar 3, 1833	Appointed to finish Ellis's term.	3	22nd	3	Appointed to continue Reed's term. Elected in 1830 to finish Reed's term. Lost re-election.	Oct 15, 1830 – Mar 3, 1835	National; Republican	George Poindexter (Wilkinson)	4
6	Vacant		Mar 4, 1833 – Nov 22, 1833	Legislature failed to elect.	4	23rd	3	Appointed to continue Reed's term. Elected in 1830 to finish Reed's term. Lost re-election.	Oct 15, 1830 – Mar 3, 1835	National; Republican	George Poindexter (Wilkinson)	4
6	John Black (Natchez)	National; Republican	Nov 22, 1833 – Jan 22, 1838	Elected late. Resigned.	4	23rd	3	Appointed to continue Reed's term. Elected in 1830 to finish Reed's term. Lost re-election.	Oct 15, 1830 – Mar 3, 1835	National; Republican	George Poindexter (Wilkinson)	4
6	John Black (Natchez)	National; Republican	Nov 22, 1833 – Jan 22, 1838	Elected late. Resigned.	4	24th	4	Elected in 1835.	Mar 4, 1835 – Mar 5, 1845	Jacksonian	Robert J. Walker (Natchez)	5
6	John Black (Natchez)	Whig	Nov 22, 1833 – Jan 22, 1838	Elected late. Resigned.	4	25th	4	Elected in 1835.	Mar 4, 1835 – Mar 5, 1845	Democratic	Robert J. Walker (Natchez)	5
7	James F. Trotter (Holly Springs)	Democratic	Jan 22, 1838 – Jul 10, 1838	Appointed to continue Black's term. Resigned.	4	25th	4	Elected in 1835.	Mar 4, 1835 – Mar 5, 1845	Democratic	Robert J. Walker (Natchez)	5
Vacant			Jul 10, 1838 – Nov 12, 1838		4	25th	4	Elected in 1835.	Mar 4, 1835 – Mar 5, 1845	Democratic	Robert J. Walker (Natchez)	5
8	Thomas H. Williams (Pontotoc)	Democratic	Nov 12, 1838 – Mar 3, 1839	Appointed to continue Black's term. Elected in 1839 to finish Black's term. [data missing].	4	25th	4	Elected in 1835.	Mar 4, 1835 – Mar 5, 1845	Democratic	Robert J. Walker (Natchez)	5
9	John Henderson (Pass Christian)	Whig	Mar 4, 1839 – Mar 3, 1845	Elected in 1838. [data missing].	5	26th	4	Elected in 1835.	Mar 4, 1835 – Mar 5, 1845	Democratic	Robert J. Walker (Natchez)	5
9	John Henderson (Pass Christian)	Whig	Mar 4, 1839 – Mar 3, 1845	Elected in 1838. [data missing].	5	27th	5	Re-elected in 1841. Resigned to become U.S. Secretary of the Treasury.	Mar 4, 1835 – Mar 5, 1845	Democratic	Robert J. Walker (Natchez)	5
9	John Henderson (Pass Christian)	Whig	Mar 4, 1839 – Mar 3, 1845	Elected in 1838. [data missing].	5	28th	5	Re-elected in 1841. Resigned to become U.S. Secretary of the Treasury.	Mar 4, 1835 – Mar 5, 1845	Democratic	Robert J. Walker (Natchez)	5
10	Jesse Speight (Plymouth)	Democratic	Mar 4, 1845 – May 1, 1847	Elected in 1844. Died.	6	29th	5	Re-elected in 1841. Resigned to become U.S. Secretary of the Treasury.	Mar 4, 1835 – Mar 5, 1845	Democratic	Robert J. Walker (Natchez)	5
10	Jesse Speight (Plymouth)	Democratic	Mar 4, 1845 – May 1, 1847	Elected in 1844. Died.	6	29th	5		Mar 5, 1845 – Nov 3, 1845	Vacant		
10	Jesse Speight (Plymouth)	Democratic	Mar 4, 1845 – May 1, 1847	Elected in 1844. Died.	6	29th	5	Appointed to continue Walker's term. Elected in 1846 to finish Walker's term. [data missing].	Nov 3, 1845 – Mar 3, 1847	Democratic	Joseph W. Chalmers (Holly Springs)	6
10	Jesse Speight (Plymouth)	Democratic	Mar 4, 1845 – May 1, 1847	Elected in 1844. Died.	6	30th	6	Elected in 1846 or 1847. Resigned to become Governor of Mississippi.	Mar 4, 1847 – Jan 8, 1852	Democratic	Henry S. Foote (Jackson)	7
Vacant			May 1, 1847 – Aug 10, 1847		6	30th	6	Elected in 1846 or 1847. Resigned to become Governor of Mississippi.	Mar 4, 1847 – Jan 8, 1852	Democratic	Henry S. Foote (Jackson)	7
11	Jefferson Davis (Davis Bend)	Democratic	Aug 10, 1847 – Sep 23, 1851	Appointed to continue Speight's term. Elected in 1848 to finish Speight's term.	6	30th	6	Elected in 1846 or 1847. Resigned to become Governor of Mississippi.	Mar 4, 1847 – Jan 8, 1852	Democratic	Henry S. Foote (Jackson)	7
11	Jefferson Davis (Davis Bend)	Democratic	Aug 10, 1847 – Sep 23, 1851	Appointed to continue Speight's term. Elected in 1848 to finish Speight's term.	6	31st	6	Elected in 1846 or 1847. Resigned to become Governor of Mississippi.	Mar 4, 1847 – Jan 8, 1852	Democratic	Henry S. Foote (Jackson)	7
11	Jefferson Davis (Davis Bend)	Democratic	Aug 10, 1847 – Sep 23, 1851	Re-elected in 1850. Resigned to run for Governor of Mississippi.	7	32nd	6	Elected in 1846 or 1847. Resigned to become Governor of Mississippi.	Mar 4, 1847 – Jan 8, 1852	Democratic	Henry S. Foote (Jackson)	7
Vacant			Sep 23, 1851 – Dec 1, 1851		7	32nd	6	Elected in 1846 or 1847. Resigned to become Governor of Mississippi.	Mar 4, 1847 – Jan 8, 1852	Democratic	Henry S. Foote (Jackson)	7
12	John J. McRae (Enterprise)	Democratic	Dec 1, 1851 – Mar 17, 1852	Appointed to continue Davis's term. Successor elected.	7	32nd	6	Elected in 1846 or 1847. Resigned to become Governor of Mississippi.	Mar 4, 1847 – Jan 8, 1852	Democratic	Henry S. Foote (Jackson)	7
12	John J. McRae (Enterprise)	Democratic	Dec 1, 1851 – Mar 17, 1852	Appointed to continue Davis's term. Successor elected.	7	32nd	6		Jan 8, 1852 – Feb 18, 1852	Vacant		
12	John J. McRae (Enterprise)	Democratic	Dec 1, 1851 – Mar 17, 1852	Appointed to continue Davis's term. Successor elected.	7	32nd	6	Elected to finish Foote's term. Retired.	Feb 18, 1852 – Mar 3, 1853	Whig	Walker Brooke (Lexington)	8
13	Stephen Adams (Aberdeen)	Democratic	Mar 17, 1852 – Mar 3, 1857	Elected to finish Davis's term. [data missing].	7	32nd	6	Elected to finish Foote's term. Retired.	Feb 18, 1852 – Mar 3, 1853	Whig	Walker Brooke (Lexington)	8
13	Stephen Adams (Aberdeen)	Democratic	Mar 17, 1852 – Mar 3, 1857	Elected to finish Davis's term. [data missing].	7	33rd	7		Mar 4, 1853 – Jan 7, 1854	Vacant		
13	Stephen Adams (Aberdeen)	Democratic	Mar 17, 1852 – Mar 3, 1857	Elected to finish Davis's term. [data missing].	7	33rd	7	Elected late in 1854	Jan 7, 1854 – Jan 12, 1861	Democratic	Albert G. Brown (Terry)	9
13	Stephen Adams (Aberdeen)	Democratic	Mar 17, 1852 – Mar 3, 1857	Elected to finish Davis's term. [data missing].	7	34th	7	Elected late in 1854	Jan 7, 1854 – Jan 12, 1861	Democratic	Albert G. Brown (Terry)	9
14	Jefferson Davis (Hurricane)	Democratic	Mar 4, 1857 – Jan 21, 1861	Elected in 1856 or 1857. Resigned.	8	35th	7	Elected late in 1854	Jan 7, 1854 – Jan 12, 1861	Democratic	Albert G. Brown (Terry)	9
14	Jefferson Davis (Hurricane)	Democratic	Mar 4, 1857 – Jan 21, 1861	Elected in 1856 or 1857. Resigned.	8	36th	8	Re-elected in 1859. Withdrew.	Jan 7, 1854 – Jan 12, 1861	Democratic	Albert G. Brown (Terry)	9
14	Jefferson Davis (Hurricane)	Democratic	Mar 4, 1857 – Jan 21, 1861	Elected in 1856 or 1857. Resigned.	8	36th	8	Civil War and Reconstruction	Jan 12, 1861 – Feb 23, 1870	Vacant		
Vacant			Jan 21, 1861 – Feb 23, 1870	Civil War and Reconstruction	8	36th	8	Civil War and Reconstruction	Jan 12, 1861 – Feb 23, 1870	Vacant		
Vacant			Jan 21, 1861 – Feb 23, 1870	Civil War and Reconstruction	8	37th	8	Civil War and Reconstruction	Jan 12, 1861 – Feb 23, 1870	Vacant		
Vacant			Jan 21, 1861 – Feb 23, 1870	Civil War and Reconstruction	9	38th	8	Civil War and Reconstruction	Jan 12, 1861 – Feb 23, 1870	Vacant		
Vacant			Jan 21, 1861 – Feb 23, 1870	Civil War and Reconstruction	9	39th	9	Civil War and Reconstruction	Jan 12, 1861 – Feb 23, 1870	Vacant		
Vacant			Jan 21, 1861 – Feb 23, 1870	Civil War and Reconstruction	9	40th	9	Civil War and Reconstruction	Jan 12, 1861 – Feb 23, 1870	Vacant		
Vacant			Jan 21, 1861 – Feb 23, 1870	Civil War and Reconstruction	10	41st	9	Civil War and Reconstruction	Jan 12, 1861 – Feb 23, 1870	Vacant		
15	Adelbert Ames (Natchez)	Republican	Feb 23, 1870 – Jan 10, 1874	Elected in 1870 upon readmission. Resigned to become Governor of Mississippi.	10	41st	9	Elected in 1870 upon readmission.	Feb 23, 1870 – Mar 3, 1871	Republican	Hiram R. Revels (Natchez)	10
15	Adelbert Ames (Natchez)	Republican	Feb 23, 1870 – Jan 10, 1874	Elected in 1870 upon readmission. Resigned to become Governor of Mississippi.	10	42nd	10		Mar 4, 1871 – Dec 1, 1871	Vacant		
15	Adelbert Ames (Natchez)	Republican	Feb 23, 1870 – Jan 10, 1874	Elected in 1870 upon readmission. Resigned to become Governor of Mississippi.	10	42nd	10	Elected in 1870, but remained Governor until Dec 1871.	Dec 1, 1871 – Mar 3, 1877	Republican	James L. Alcorn (Friars Point)	11
15	Adelbert Ames (Natchez)	Republican	Feb 23, 1870 – Jan 10, 1874	Elected in 1870 upon readmission. Resigned to become Governor of Mississippi.	10	43rd	10	Elected in 1870, but remained Governor until Dec 1871.	Dec 1, 1871 – Mar 3, 1877	Republican	James L. Alcorn (Friars Point)	11
Vacant			Jan 4, 1874 – Feb 3, 1874		10	43rd	10	Elected in 1870, but remained Governor until Dec 1871.	Dec 1, 1871 – Mar 3, 1877	Republican	James L. Alcorn (Friars Point)	11
16	Henry R. Pease (Jackson)	Republican	Feb 3, 1874 – Mar 3, 1875	Elected to finish Ames's term. Retired.		43rd	10	Elected in 1870, but remained Governor until Dec 1871.	Dec 1, 1871 – Mar 3, 1877	Republican	James L. Alcorn (Friars Point)	11
17	Blanche Bruce (Bolivar)	Republican	Mar 4, 1875 – Mar 3, 1881	Elected in 1874. [data missing].	11	44th	10	Elected in 1870, but remained Governor until Dec 1871.	Dec 1, 1871 – Mar 3, 1877	Republican	James L. Alcorn (Friars Point)	11
17	Blanche Bruce (Bolivar)	Republican	Mar 4, 1875 – Mar 3, 1881	Elected in 1874. [data missing].	11	45th	11	Elected in 1876.	Mar 4, 1877 – Mar 6, 1885	Democratic	Lucius Q. C. Lamar (Oxford)	12
17	Blanche Bruce (Bolivar)	Republican	Mar 4, 1875 – Mar 3, 1881	Elected in 1874. [data missing].	11	46th	11	Elected in 1876.	Mar 4, 1877 – Mar 6, 1885	Democratic	Lucius Q. C. Lamar (Oxford)	12
18	James Z. George (Carrollton)	Democratic	Mar 4, 1881 – Aug 14, 1897	Elected in 1880.	12	47th	11	Elected in 1876.	Mar 4, 1877 – Mar 6, 1885	Democratic	Lucius Q. C. Lamar (Oxford)	12
18	James Z. George (Carrollton)	Democratic	Mar 4, 1881 – Aug 14, 1897	Elected in 1880.	12	48th	12	Re-elected in 1883. Resigned.	Mar 4, 1877 – Mar 6, 1885	Democratic	Lucius Q. C. Lamar (Oxford)	12
18	James Z. George (Carrollton)	Democratic	Mar 4, 1881 – Aug 14, 1897	Elected in 1880.	12	49th	12	Re-elected in 1883. Resigned.	Mar 4, 1877 – Mar 6, 1885	Democratic	Lucius Q. C. Lamar (Oxford)	12
18	James Z. George (Carrollton)	Democratic	Mar 4, 1881 – Aug 14, 1897	Elected in 1880.	12	49th	12		Mar 6, 1885 – Mar 9, 1885	Vacant		
18	James Z. George (Carrollton)	Democratic	Mar 4, 1881 – Aug 14, 1897	Elected in 1880.	12	49th	12	Appointed to continue Lamar's term. Elected in 1886 to finish Lamar's term.	Mar 9, 1885 – Jan 24, 1894	Democratic	Edward C. Walthall (Grenada)	13
18	James Z. George (Carrollton)	Democratic	Mar 4, 1881 – Aug 14, 1897	Re-elected in 1886.	13	50th	12	Appointed to continue Lamar's term. Elected in 1886 to finish Lamar's term.	Mar 9, 1885 – Jan 24, 1894	Democratic	Edward C. Walthall (Grenada)	13
18	James Z. George (Carrollton)	Democratic	Mar 4, 1881 – Aug 14, 1897	Re-elected in 1886.	13	51st	13	Re-elected in 1889. Resigned.	Mar 9, 1885 – Jan 24, 1894	Democratic	Edward C. Walthall (Grenada)	13
18	James Z. George (Carrollton)	Democratic	Mar 4, 1881 – Aug 14, 1897	Re-elected in 1886.	13	52nd	13	Re-elected in 1889. Resigned.	Mar 9, 1885 – Jan 24, 1894	Democratic	Edward C. Walthall (Grenada)	13
18	James Z. George (Carrollton)	Democratic	Mar 4, 1881 – Aug 14, 1897	Re-elected in 1892. Died.	14	53rd	13	Re-elected in 1889. Resigned.	Mar 9, 1885 – Jan 24, 1894	Democratic	Edward C. Walthall (Grenada)	13
18	James Z. George (Carrollton)	Democratic	Mar 4, 1881 – Aug 14, 1897	Re-elected in 1892. Died.	14	53rd	13		Jan 24, 1894 – Feb 7, 1894	Vacant		
18	James Z. George (Carrollton)	Democratic	Mar 4, 1881 – Aug 14, 1897	Re-elected in 1892. Died.	14	53rd	13	Elected to finish Walthall's term. [data missing].	Feb 7, 1894 – Mar 3, 1895	Democratic	Anselm J. McLaurin (Brandon)	14
18	James Z. George (Carrollton)	Democratic	Mar 4, 1881 – Aug 14, 1897	Re-elected in 1892. Died.	14	54th	14	Elected early in 1892. Died.	Mar 4, 1895 – Apr 21, 1898	Democratic	Edward C. Walthall (Grenada)	15
18	James Z. George (Carrollton)	Democratic	Mar 4, 1881 – Aug 14, 1897	Re-elected in 1892. Died.	14	55th	14	Elected early in 1892. Died.	Mar 4, 1895 – Apr 21, 1898	Democratic	Edward C. Walthall (Grenada)	15
Vacant			Aug 14, 1897 – Oct 8, 1897		14	55th	14	Elected early in 1892. Died.	Mar 4, 1895 – Apr 21, 1898	Democratic	Edward C. Walthall (Grenada)	15
19	Hernando Money (Mississippi City)	Democratic	Oct 8, 1897 – Mar 3, 1911	Appointed to finish George's term.	14	55th	14	Elected early in 1892. Died.	Mar 4, 1895 – Apr 21, 1898	Democratic	Edward C. Walthall (Grenada)	15
19	Hernando Money (Mississippi City)	Democratic	Oct 8, 1897 – Mar 3, 1911	Appointed to finish George's term.	14	55th	14		Apr 21, 1898 – May 31, 1898	Vacant		
19	Hernando Money (Mississippi City)	Democratic	Oct 8, 1897 – Mar 3, 1911	Appointed to finish George's term.	14	55th	14	Appointed to continue Walthall's term. Elected in 1900 to finish Walthall's term. Retired.	May 31, 1898 – Mar 3, 1901	Democratic	William V. Sullivan (Oxford)	16
19	Hernando Money (Mississippi City)	Democratic	Oct 8, 1897 – Mar 3, 1911	Elected to full term in 1899.	15	56th	14	Appointed to continue Walthall's term. Elected in 1900 to finish Walthall's term. Retired.	May 31, 1898 – Mar 3, 1901	Democratic	William V. Sullivan (Oxford)	16
19	Hernando Money (Mississippi City)	Democratic	Oct 8, 1897 – Mar 3, 1911	Elected to full term in 1899.	15	57th	15	Elected in 1900.	Mar 4, 1901 – Dec 22, 1909	Democratic	Anselm J. McLaurin (Brandon)	17
19	Hernando Money (Mississippi City)	Democratic	Oct 8, 1897 – Mar 3, 1911	Elected to full term in 1899.	15	58th	15	Elected in 1900.	Mar 4, 1901 – Dec 22, 1909	Democratic	Anselm J. McLaurin (Brandon)	17
19	Hernando Money (Mississippi City)	Democratic	Oct 8, 1897 – Mar 3, 1911	Re-elected in 1904. Retired.	16	59th	15	Elected in 1900.	Mar 4, 1901 – Dec 22, 1909	Democratic	Anselm J. McLaurin (Brandon)	17
19	Hernando Money (Mississippi City)	Democratic	Oct 8, 1897 – Mar 3, 1911	Re-elected in 1904. Retired.	16	60th	16	Re-elected early in 1904. Died.	Mar 4, 1901 – Dec 22, 1909	Democratic	Anselm J. McLaurin (Brandon)	17
19	Hernando Money (Mississippi City)	Democratic	Oct 8, 1897 – Mar 3, 1911	Re-elected in 1904. Retired.	16	61st	16	Re-elected early in 1904. Died.	Mar 4, 1901 – Dec 22, 1909	Democratic	Anselm J. McLaurin (Brandon)	17
19	Hernando Money (Mississippi City)	Democratic	Oct 8, 1897 – Mar 3, 1911	Re-elected in 1904. Retired.	16	61st	16		Dec 22, 1909 – Dec 27, 1909	Vacant		
19	Hernando Money (Mississippi City)	Democratic	Oct 8, 1897 – Mar 3, 1911	Re-elected in 1904. Retired.	16	61st	16	Appointed to continue McLaurin's term. Successor qualified.	Dec 27, 1909 – Feb 22, 1910	Democratic	James Gordon (Okolona)	18
19	Hernando Money (Mississippi City)	Democratic	Oct 8, 1897 – Mar 3, 1911	Re-elected in 1904. Retired.	16	61st	16	Elected to finish McLaurin's term. Lost nomination to full term.	Feb 23, 1910 – Mar 3, 1913	Democratic	LeRoy Percy (Greenville)	19
20	John Sharp Williams (Yazoo City)	Democratic	Mar 4, 1911 – Mar 3, 1923	Elected early in 1908.	17	62nd	16	Elected to finish McLaurin's term. Lost nomination to full term.	Feb 23, 1910 – Mar 3, 1913	Democratic	LeRoy Percy (Greenville)	19
20	John Sharp Williams (Yazoo City)	Democratic	Mar 4, 1911 – Mar 3, 1923	Elected early in 1908.	17	63rd	17	Elected in 1912. Lost renomination.	Mar 4, 1913 – Mar 3, 1919	Democratic	James K. Vardaman (Jackson)	20
20	John Sharp Williams (Yazoo City)	Democratic	Mar 4, 1911 – Mar 3, 1923	Elected early in 1908.	17	64th	17	Elected in 1912. Lost renomination.	Mar 4, 1913 – Mar 3, 1919	Democratic	James K. Vardaman (Jackson)	20
20	John Sharp Williams (Yazoo City)	Democratic	Mar 4, 1911 – Mar 3, 1923	Re-elected in 1916. Retired.	18	65th	17	Elected in 1912. Lost renomination.	Mar 4, 1913 – Mar 3, 1919	Democratic	James K. Vardaman (Jackson)	20
20	John Sharp Williams (Yazoo City)	Democratic	Mar 4, 1911 – Mar 3, 1923	Re-elected in 1916. Retired.	18	66th	18	Elected in 1918.	Mar 4, 1919 – Jun 22, 1941	Democratic	Pat Harrison (Gulfport)	21
20	John Sharp Williams (Yazoo City)	Democratic	Mar 4, 1911 – Mar 3, 1923	Re-elected in 1916. Retired.	18	67th	18	Elected in 1918.	Mar 4, 1919 – Jun 22, 1941	Democratic	Pat Harrison (Gulfport)	21
21	Hubert D. Stephens (New Albany)	Democratic	Mar 4, 1923 – Jan 3, 1935	Elected in 1922.	19	68th	18	Elected in 1918.	Mar 4, 1919 – Jun 22, 1941	Democratic	Pat Harrison (Gulfport)	21
21	Hubert D. Stephens (New Albany)	Democratic	Mar 4, 1923 – Jan 3, 1935	Elected in 1922.	19	69th	19	Re-elected in 1924.	Mar 4, 1919 – Jun 22, 1941	Democratic	Pat Harrison (Gulfport)	21
21	Hubert D. Stephens (New Albany)	Democratic	Mar 4, 1923 – Jan 3, 1935	Elected in 1922.	19	70th	19	Re-elected in 1924.	Mar 4, 1919 – Jun 22, 1941	Democratic	Pat Harrison (Gulfport)	21
21	Hubert D. Stephens (New Albany)	Democratic	Mar 4, 1923 – Jan 3, 1935	Re-elected in 1928. Lost renomination.	20	71st	19	Re-elected in 1924.	Mar 4, 1919 – Jun 22, 1941	Democratic	Pat Harrison (Gulfport)	21
21	Hubert D. Stephens (New Albany)	Democratic	Mar 4, 1923 – Jan 3, 1935	Re-elected in 1928. Lost renomination.	20	72nd	20	Re-elected in 1930.	Mar 4, 1919 – Jun 22, 1941	Democratic	Pat Harrison (Gulfport)	21
21	Hubert D. Stephens (New Albany)	Democratic	Mar 4, 1923 – Jan 3, 1935	Re-elected in 1928. Lost renomination.	20	73rd	20	Re-elected in 1930.	Mar 4, 1919 – Jun 22, 1941	Democratic	Pat Harrison (Gulfport)	21
22	Theodore G. Bilbo (Poplarville)	Democratic	Jan 3, 1935 – Aug 21, 1947	Elected in 1934.	21	74th	20	Re-elected in 1930.	Mar 4, 1919 – Jun 22, 1941	Democratic	Pat Harrison (Gulfport)	21
22	Theodore G. Bilbo (Poplarville)	Democratic	Jan 3, 1935 – Aug 21, 1947	Elected in 1934.	21	75th	21	Re-elected in 1936. Died.	Mar 4, 1919 – Jun 22, 1941	Democratic	Pat Harrison (Gulfport)	21
22	Theodore G. Bilbo (Poplarville)	Democratic	Jan 3, 1935 – Aug 21, 1947	Elected in 1934.	21	76th	21	Re-elected in 1936. Died.	Mar 4, 1919 – Jun 22, 1941	Democratic	Pat Harrison (Gulfport)	21
22	Theodore G. Bilbo (Poplarville)	Democratic	Jan 3, 1935 – Aug 21, 1947	Re-elected in 1940.	22	77th	21	Re-elected in 1936. Died.	Mar 4, 1919 – Jun 22, 1941	Democratic	Pat Harrison (Gulfport)	21
22	Theodore G. Bilbo (Poplarville)	Democratic	Jan 3, 1935 – Aug 21, 1947	Re-elected in 1940.	22	77th	21		Jun 22, 1941 – Jun 30, 1941	Vacant		
22	Theodore G. Bilbo (Poplarville)	Democratic	Jan 3, 1935 – Aug 21, 1947	Re-elected in 1940.	22	77th	21	Appointed to continue Harrison's term. Retired when successor elected.	Jun 30, 1941 – Sep 28, 1941	Democratic	James Eastland (Ruleville)	22
22	Theodore G. Bilbo (Poplarville)	Democratic	Jan 3, 1935 – Aug 21, 1947	Re-elected in 1940.	22	77th	21	Elected to finish Harrison's term. Lost renomination.	Sep 29, 1941 – Jan 3, 1943	Democratic	Wall Doxey (Holly Springs)	23
22	Theodore G. Bilbo (Poplarville)	Democratic	Jan 3, 1935 – Aug 21, 1947	Re-elected in 1940.	22	78th	22	Elected in 1942.	Jan 3, 1943 – Dec 27, 1978	Democratic	James Eastland (Doddsville)	24
22	Theodore G. Bilbo (Poplarville)	Democratic	Jan 3, 1935 – Aug 21, 1947	Re-elected in 1940.	22	79th	22	Elected in 1942.	Jan 3, 1943 – Dec 27, 1978	Democratic	James Eastland (Doddsville)	24
22	Theodore G. Bilbo (Poplarville)	Democratic	Jan 3, 1935 – Aug 21, 1947	Re-elected in 1946. Died.	23	80th	22	Elected in 1942.	Jan 3, 1943 – Dec 27, 1978	Democratic	James Eastland (Doddsville)	24
Vacant			Aug 21, 1947 – Nov 5, 1947		23	80th	22	Elected in 1942.	Jan 3, 1943 – Dec 27, 1978	Democratic	James Eastland (Doddsville)	24
23	John C. Stennis (De Kalb)	Democratic	Nov 5, 1947 – Jan 3, 1989	Elected to finish Bilbo's term.	23	80th	22	Elected in 1942.	Jan 3, 1943 – Dec 27, 1978	Democratic	James Eastland (Doddsville)	24
23	John C. Stennis (De Kalb)	Democratic	Nov 5, 1947 – Jan 3, 1989	Elected to finish Bilbo's term.	23	81st	23	Re-elected in 1948.	Jan 3, 1943 – Dec 27, 1978	Democratic	James Eastland (Doddsville)	24
23	John C. Stennis (De Kalb)	Democratic	Nov 5, 1947 – Jan 3, 1989	Elected to finish Bilbo's term.	23	82nd	23	Re-elected in 1948.	Jan 3, 1943 – Dec 27, 1978	Democratic	James Eastland (Doddsville)	24
23	John C. Stennis (De Kalb)	Democratic	Nov 5, 1947 – Jan 3, 1989	Re-elected in 1952.	24	83rd	23	Re-elected in 1948.	Jan 3, 1943 – Dec 27, 1978	Democratic	James Eastland (Doddsville)	24
23	John C. Stennis (De Kalb)	Democratic	Nov 5, 1947 – Jan 3, 1989	Re-elected in 1952.	24	84th	24	Re-elected in 1954.	Jan 3, 1943 – Dec 27, 1978	Democratic	James Eastland (Doddsville)	24
23	John C. Stennis (De Kalb)	Democratic	Nov 5, 1947 – Jan 3, 1989	Re-elected in 1952.	24	85th	24	Re-elected in 1954.	Jan 3, 1943 – Dec 27, 1978	Democratic	James Eastland (Doddsville)	24
23	John C. Stennis (De Kalb)	Democratic	Nov 5, 1947 – Jan 3, 1989	Re-elected in 1958.	25	86th	24	Re-elected in 1954.	Jan 3, 1943 – Dec 27, 1978	Democratic	James Eastland (Doddsville)	24
23	John C. Stennis (De Kalb)	Democratic	Nov 5, 1947 – Jan 3, 1989	Re-elected in 1958.	25	87th	25	Re-elected in 1960.	Jan 3, 1943 – Dec 27, 1978	Democratic	James Eastland (Doddsville)	24
23	John C. Stennis (De Kalb)	Democratic	Nov 5, 1947 – Jan 3, 1989	Re-elected in 1958.	25	88th	25	Re-elected in 1960.	Jan 3, 1943 – Dec 27, 1978	Democratic	James Eastland (Doddsville)	24
23	John C. Stennis (De Kalb)	Democratic	Nov 5, 1947 – Jan 3, 1989	Re-elected in 1964.	26	89th	25	Re-elected in 1960.	Jan 3, 1943 – Dec 27, 1978	Democratic	James Eastland (Doddsville)	24
23	John C. Stennis (De Kalb)	Democratic	Nov 5, 1947 – Jan 3, 1989	Re-elected in 1964.	26	90th	26	Re-elected in 1966.	Jan 3, 1943 – Dec 27, 1978	Democratic	James Eastland (Doddsville)	24
23	John C. Stennis (De Kalb)	Democratic	Nov 5, 1947 – Jan 3, 1989	Re-elected in 1964.	26	91st	26	Re-elected in 1966.	Jan 3, 1943 – Dec 27, 1978	Democratic	James Eastland (Doddsville)	24
23	John C. Stennis (De Kalb)	Democratic	Nov 5, 1947 – Jan 3, 1989	Re-elected in 1970.	27	92nd	26	Re-elected in 1966.	Jan 3, 1943 – Dec 27, 1978	Democratic	James Eastland (Doddsville)	24
23	John C. Stennis (De Kalb)	Democratic	Nov 5, 1947 – Jan 3, 1989	Re-elected in 1970.	27	93rd	27	Re-elected in 1972. Retired, and resigned early to give successor preferential seniority.	Jan 3, 1943 – Dec 27, 1978	Democratic	James Eastland (Doddsville)	24
23	John C. Stennis (De Kalb)	Democratic	Nov 5, 1947 – Jan 3, 1989	Re-elected in 1970.	27	94th	27	Re-elected in 1972. Retired, and resigned early to give successor preferential seniority.	Jan 3, 1943 – Dec 27, 1978	Democratic	James Eastland (Doddsville)	24
23	John C. Stennis (De Kalb)	Democratic	Nov 5, 1947 – Jan 3, 1989	Re-elected in 1976.	28	95th	27	Re-elected in 1972. Retired, and resigned early to give successor preferential seniority.	Jan 3, 1943 – Dec 27, 1978	Democratic	James Eastland (Doddsville)	24
23	John C. Stennis (De Kalb)	Democratic	Nov 5, 1947 – Jan 3, 1989	Re-elected in 1976.	28	95th	27	Appointed early to finish Eastland's term, having already been elected to the next term.	Dec 27, 1978 – Apr 1, 2018	Republican	Thad Cochran (Oxford)	25
23	John C. Stennis (De Kalb)	Democratic	Nov 5, 1947 – Jan 3, 1989	Re-elected in 1976.	28	96th	28	Elected in 1978.	Dec 27, 1978 – Apr 1, 2018	Republican	Thad Cochran (Oxford)	25
23	John C. Stennis (De Kalb)	Democratic	Nov 5, 1947 – Jan 3, 1989	Re-elected in 1976.	28	97th	28	Elected in 1978.	Dec 27, 1978 – Apr 1, 2018	Republican	Thad Cochran (Oxford)	25
23	John C. Stennis (De Kalb)	Democratic	Nov 5, 1947 – Jan 3, 1989	Re-elected in 1982. Retired.	29	98th	28	Elected in 1978.	Dec 27, 1978 – Apr 1, 2018	Republican	Thad Cochran (Oxford)	25
23	John C. Stennis (De Kalb)	Democratic	Nov 5, 1947 – Jan 3, 1989	Re-elected in 1982. Retired.	29	99th	29	Re-elected in 1984.	Dec 27, 1978 – Apr 1, 2018	Republican	Thad Cochran (Oxford)	25
23	John C. Stennis (De Kalb)	Democratic	Nov 5, 1947 – Jan 3, 1989	Re-elected in 1982. Retired.	29	100th	29	Re-elected in 1984.	Dec 27, 1978 – Apr 1, 2018	Republican	Thad Cochran (Oxford)	25
24	Trent Lott (Pascagoula)	Republican	Jan 3, 1989 – Dec 18, 2007	Elected in 1988.	30	101st	29	Re-elected in 1984.	Dec 27, 1978 – Apr 1, 2018	Republican	Thad Cochran (Oxford)	25
24	Trent Lott (Pascagoula)	Republican	Jan 3, 1989 – Dec 18, 2007	Elected in 1988.	30	102nd	30	Re-elected in 1990.	Dec 27, 1978 – Apr 1, 2018	Republican	Thad Cochran (Oxford)	25
24	Trent Lott (Pascagoula)	Republican	Jan 3, 1989 – Dec 18, 2007	Elected in 1988.	30	103rd	30	Re-elected in 1990.	Dec 27, 1978 – Apr 1, 2018	Republican	Thad Cochran (Oxford)	25
24	Trent Lott (Pascagoula)	Republican	Jan 3, 1989 – Dec 18, 2007	Re-elected in 1994.	31	104th	30	Re-elected in 1990.	Dec 27, 1978 – Apr 1, 2018	Republican	Thad Cochran (Oxford)	25
24	Trent Lott (Pascagoula)	Republican	Jan 3, 1989 – Dec 18, 2007	Re-elected in 1994.	31	105th	31	Re-elected in 1996.	Dec 27, 1978 – Apr 1, 2018	Republican	Thad Cochran (Oxford)	25
24	Trent Lott (Pascagoula)	Republican	Jan 3, 1989 – Dec 18, 2007	Re-elected in 1994.	31	106th	31	Re-elected in 1996.	Dec 27, 1978 – Apr 1, 2018	Republican	Thad Cochran (Oxford)	25
24	Trent Lott (Pascagoula)	Republican	Jan 3, 1989 – Dec 18, 2007	Re-elected in 2000.	32	107th	31	Re-elected in 1996.	Dec 27, 1978 – Apr 1, 2018	Republican	Thad Cochran (Oxford)	25
24	Trent Lott (Pascagoula)	Republican	Jan 3, 1989 – Dec 18, 2007	Re-elected in 2000.	32	108th	32	Re-elected in 2002.	Dec 27, 1978 – Apr 1, 2018	Republican	Thad Cochran (Oxford)	25
24	Trent Lott (Pascagoula)	Republican	Jan 3, 1989 – Dec 18, 2007	Re-elected in 2000.	32	109th	32	Re-elected in 2002.	Dec 27, 1978 – Apr 1, 2018	Republican	Thad Cochran (Oxford)	25
24	Trent Lott (Pascagoula)	Republican	Jan 3, 1989 – Dec 18, 2007	Re-elected in 2006. Resigned.	33	110th	32	Re-elected in 2002.	Dec 27, 1978 – Apr 1, 2018	Republican	Thad Cochran (Oxford)	25
Vacant			Dec 18, 2007 – Dec 31, 2007		33	110th	32	Re-elected in 2002.	Dec 27, 1978 – Apr 1, 2018	Republican	Thad Cochran (Oxford)	25
25	Roger Wicker (Tupelo)	Republican	Dec 31, 2007 – present	Appointed to continue Lott's term. Elected in 2008 to finish Lott's term.	33	110th	32	Re-elected in 2002.	Dec 27, 1978 – Apr 1, 2018	Republican	Thad Cochran (Oxford)	25
25	Roger Wicker (Tupelo)	Republican	Dec 31, 2007 – present	Appointed to continue Lott's term. Elected in 2008 to finish Lott's term.	33	111th	33	Re-elected in 2008.	Dec 27, 1978 – Apr 1, 2018	Republican	Thad Cochran (Oxford)	25
25	Roger Wicker (Tupelo)	Republican	Dec 31, 2007 – present	Appointed to continue Lott's term. Elected in 2008 to finish Lott's term.	33	112th	33	Re-elected in 2008.	Dec 27, 1978 – Apr 1, 2018	Republican	Thad Cochran (Oxford)	25
25	Roger Wicker (Tupelo)	Republican	Dec 31, 2007 – present	Re-elected in 2012.	34	113th	33	Re-elected in 2008.	Dec 27, 1978 – Apr 1, 2018	Republican	Thad Cochran (Oxford)	25
25	Roger Wicker (Tupelo)	Republican	Dec 31, 2007 – present	Re-elected in 2012.	34	114th	34	Re-elected in 2014. Resigned.	Dec 27, 1978 – Apr 1, 2018	Republican	Thad Cochran (Oxford)	25
25	Roger Wicker (Tupelo)	Republican	Dec 31, 2007 – present	Re-elected in 2012.	34	115th	34	Re-elected in 2014. Resigned.	Dec 27, 1978 – Apr 1, 2018	Republican	Thad Cochran (Oxford)	25
25	Roger Wicker (Tupelo)	Republican	Dec 31, 2007 – present	Re-elected in 2012.	34	115th	34	Appointed to continue Cochran's term. Elected in 2018 in runoff election to finish Cochran's term.	Apr 2, 2018 – present	Republican	Cindy Hyde-Smith (Brookhaven)	26
25	Roger Wicker (Tupelo)	Republican	Dec 31, 2007 – present	Re-elected in 2018.	35	116th	34	Appointed to continue Cochran's term. Elected in 2018 in runoff election to finish Cochran's term.	Apr 2, 2018 – present	Republican	Cindy Hyde-Smith (Brookhaven)	26
25	Roger Wicker (Tupelo)	Republican	Dec 31, 2007 – present	Re-elected in 2018.	35	117th	35	Re-elected in 2020. Lost re-election.	Apr 2, 2018 – present	Republican	Cindy Hyde-Smith (Brookhaven)	26
25	Roger Wicker (Tupelo)	Republican	Dec 31, 2007 – present	Re-elected in 2018.	35	118th	35	Re-elected in 2020. Lost re-election.	Apr 2, 2018 – present	Republican	Cindy Hyde-Smith (Brookhaven)	26
25	Roger Wicker (Tupelo)	Republican	Dec 31, 2007 – present	Re-elected in 2024.	36	119th	35	Re-elected in 2020. Lost re-election.	Apr 2, 2018 – present	Republican	Cindy Hyde-Smith (Brookhaven)	26
25	Roger Wicker (Tupelo)	Republican	Dec 31, 2007 – present	Re-elected in 2024.	36	120th	36	Elected in 2026.	Taking office Jan 3, 2027	Democratic	Scott Colom (Elect) (Columbus)	27
25	Roger Wicker (Tupelo)	Republican	Dec 31, 2007 – present	Re-elected in 2024.	36	121st	36	Elected in 2026.	Taking office Jan 3, 2027	Democratic	Scott Colom (Elect) (Columbus)	27
To be determined in the 2030 election.					37	122nd	36	Elected in 2026.	Taking office Jan 3, 2027	Democratic	Scott Colom (Elect) (Columbus)	27
To be determined in the 2030 election.					37	123rd	37	To be determined in the 2032 election.				

== See also ==
- Elections in Mississippi
- List of United States representatives from Mississippi
- Mississippi's congressional delegations
