= 1976 United States Senate election in Mississippi =

1976 U.S. Senate Democratic primary in Mississippi
- June 1, 1976
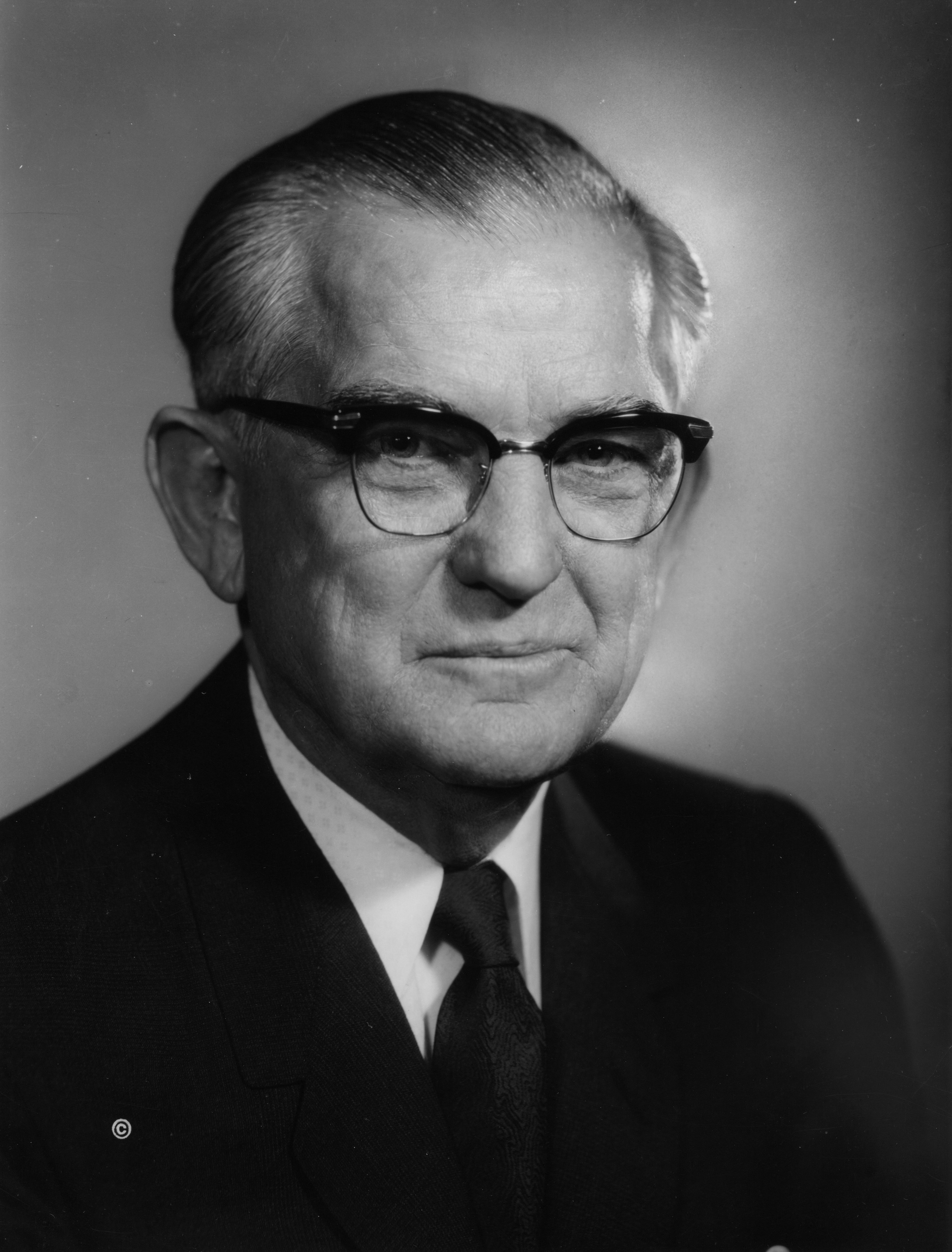

Nominee	John C. Stennis	E. Michael Marks
Party	Democratic	Democratic
Popular vote	157,943	27,016
Percentage	85.39%	14.61%
- County results Stennis: 60–70% 70–80% 80–90% >90%
U.S. senator before election
John C. Stennis
Democratic
Elected U.S. Senator
John C. Stennis
Democratic

The 1976 United States Senate election in Mississippi was held on November 2, 1976. Incumbent Democratic U.S. Senator John C. Stennis won re-election to his sixth term.

Because Stennis was unopposed in the general election, his victory in the June 1 primary was tantamount to election.

== Democratic primary ==
=== Candidates ===
- E. Michael Marks, Jackson attorney
- John C. Stennis, incumbent U.S. senator

=== Results ===
1976 Democratic U.S. Senate primary
Party	Candidate	Votes	%
Democratic	John C. Stennis (incumbent)	157,943	85.39
Democratic	E. Michael Marks	27,016	14.61
Total votes		184,959	100.00%

== General election ==
=== Results ===
General election results
Party	Candidate	Votes	%	±%
Democratic	John C. Stennis (incumbent)	554,433	100.00	▲11.60
Total votes		554,433	100.00%	

== See also ==
- 1976 United States Senate elections
