= 1952 United States Senate election in Mississippi =

1952 U.S. Senate Democratic primary in Mississippi
- August 26, 1952
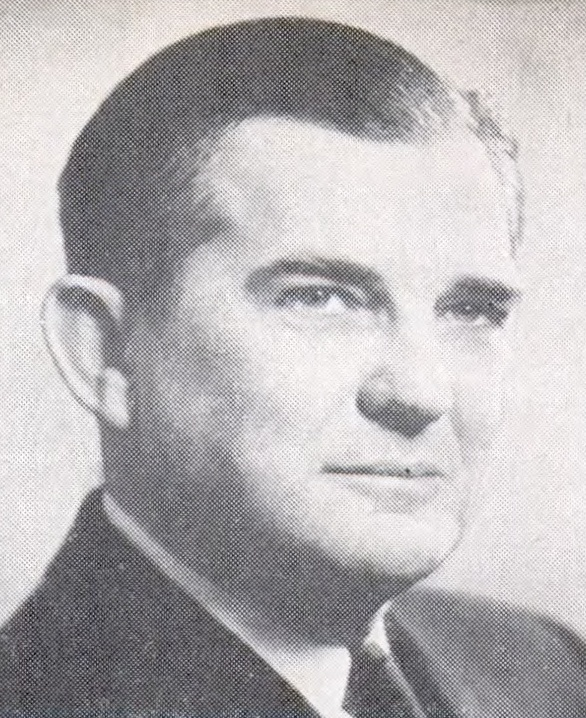

Nominee	John C. Stennis	William P. Davis
Party	Democratic	Democratic
Popular vote	191,380	22,802
Percentage	89.35%	10.65%
- County results Stennis: 70–80% 80–90% >90%
U.S. senator before election
John C. Stennis
Democratic
Elected U.S. Senator
John C. Stennis
Democratic

The 1952 United States Senate election in Mississippi took place on November 4, 1952. Incumbent Democratic U.S. Senator John C. Stennis was re-elected to his second (his first full) term in office.

Because Stennis was unopposed in the general election, his victory in the August 26 primary was tantamount to election. He defeated William P. Davis in a landslide.

== Democratic primary ==
The Democratic primary election was held on August 26, 1952.

=== Candidates ===
- William P. Davis, undertaker
- John C. Stennis, incumbent U.S. Senator

=== Results ===
1952 Democratic U.S. Senate primary
Party	Candidate	Votes	%
Democratic	John C. Stennis (incumbent)	191,380	89.35%
Democratic	William P. Davis	22,802	10.65%
Total votes		214,182	100.00%

== General election ==
=== Results ===
1952 U.S. Senate election in Mississippi
Party	Candidate	Votes	%	±%
Democratic	John C. Stennis (incumbent)	233,919	100.00%	
Turnout		233,919		
Democratic hold		Swing		

== Bibliography ==
- Congressional Elections, 1946-1996. Washington, D.C.: Congressional Quarterly Inc. 1998. ISBN 1-56802-248-4.
- Scammon, Richard M., ed. (1964). America Votes 5: a handbook of contemporary American election statistics, 1962. Washington, D.C.: Governmental Affairs Institute.
