= 1982 United States Senate election in Mississippi =

- November 2, 1982
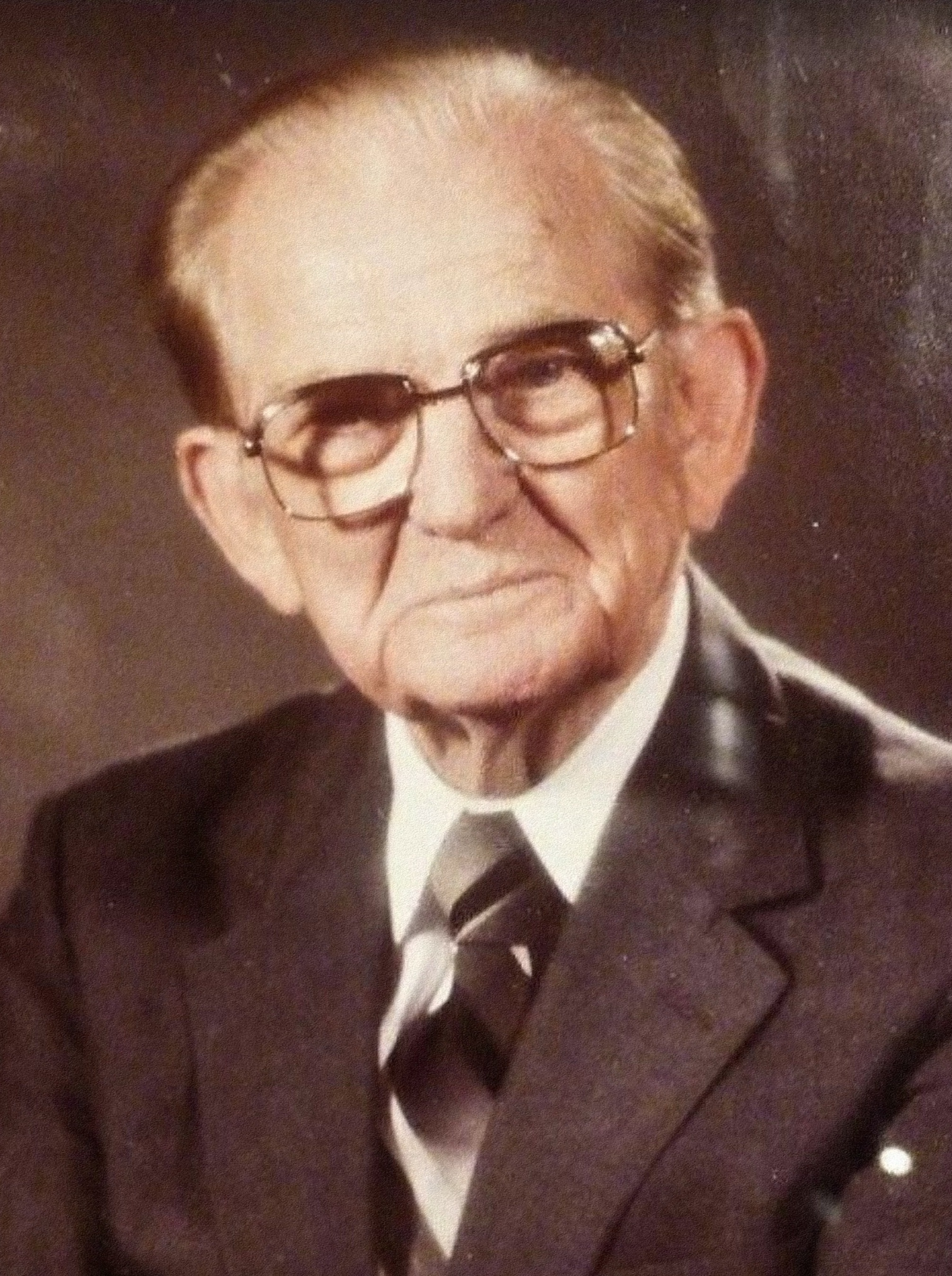

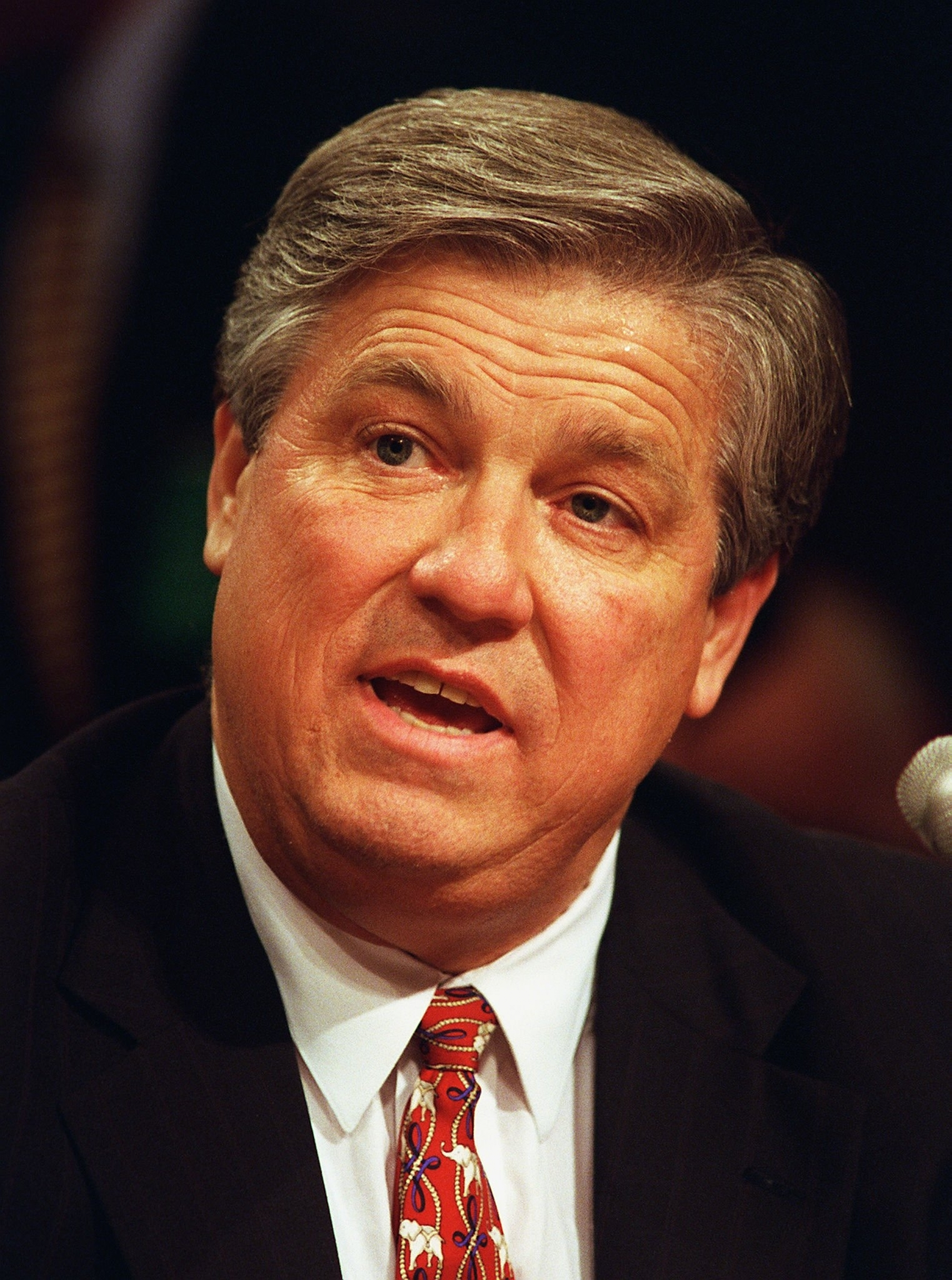
Nominee	John C. Stennis	Haley Barbour
Party	Democratic	Republican
Popular vote	414,099	230,927
Percentage	64.20%	35.80%
- County results Stennis: 50–60% 60–70% 70–80% 80–90% >90% Barbour: 50–60%
U.S. senator before election
John C. Stennis
Democratic
Elected U.S. Senator
John C. Stennis
Democratic

The 1982 United States Senate election in Mississippi was held on November 2, 1982. Incumbent Senator John C. Stennis won re-election to his seventh term against political operative and future Republican governor Haley Barbour. This was the only time Stennis faced off against a Republican during his entire Senate career and the last time a Democrat won a US Senate seat in the state until 2026.

== Democratic primary ==
=== Candidates ===
- John C. Stennis, incumbent U.S. senator
- Charles Pittman, state senator
- Colon Johnson

=== Results ===
Democratic primary results
Party	Candidate	Votes	%
Democratic	John C. Stennis (incumbent)	145,817	75.1%
Democratic	Charles Pittman	33,651	17.3%
Democratic	Colon Johnson	14,696	7.6%
Total votes		194,164	

== Republican primary ==
=== Candidates ===
- Haley Barbour, political operative who campaigned for U.S. Presidents Richard Nixon and Gerald Ford

== Results ==
General election results
Party	Candidate	Votes	%
Democratic	John Stennis (incumbent)	414,099	64.20%
Republican	Haley Barbour	230,927	35.80%
Democratic hold			

== See also ==
- 1982 United States Senate elections
