= 1958 United States Senate election in Mississippi =

- November 4, 1958
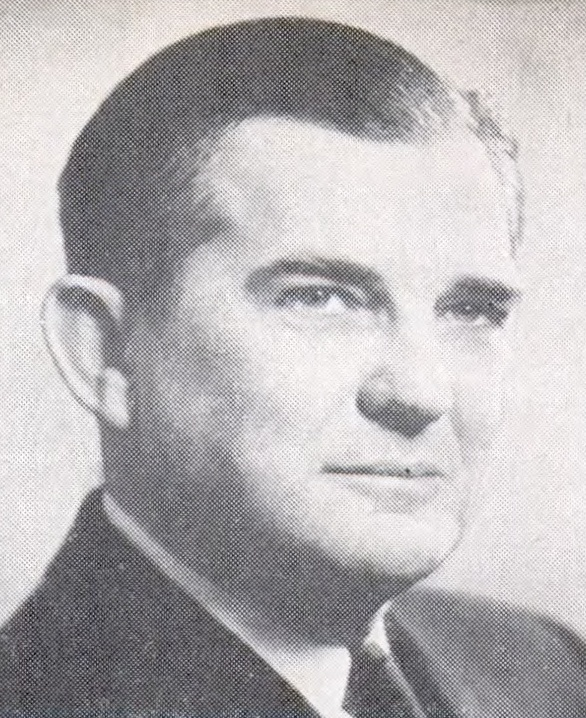
Nominee	John C. Stennis
Party	Democratic
Popular vote	61,039
Percentage	100.00%
- County results Stennis: 100%
U.S. senator before election
John C. Stennis
Democratic
Elected U.S. Senator
John C. Stennis
Democratic

The 1958 United States Senate election in Mississippi took place on November 4, 1958. Incumbent Democratic U.S. Senator John C. Stennis was re-elected to a third term in office.

Because Stennis was unopposed in the general election, his victory in the August 26 primary was tantamount to election. Stennis was also unopposed in the primary.

== Democratic primary ==
The Democratic primary election was held on August 26, 1958.

=== Candidates ===
- John C. Stennis, incumbent U.S. Senator

=== Results ===
1958 Democratic U.S. Senate primary
Party	Candidate	Votes	%
Democratic	John C. Stennis (incumbent)		unopposed

== General election ==
=== Results ===
1958 U.S. Senate election in Mississippi
Party	Candidate	Votes	%	±%
Democratic	John C. Stennis (incumbent)	61,039	100.00%	
Turnout		61,039		
Democratic hold		Swing		

== Bibliography ==
- Congressional Elections, 1946-1996. Washington, D.C.: Congressional Quarterly Inc. 1998. ISBN 1-56802-248-4.
- Scammon, Richard M. (1959). Southern Primaries 58. Washington, D.C.: Governmental Affairs Institute.
