= Charles Pittman (politician) =

American politician (1948–2024)

James Charles Pittman (July 6, 1948 – August 27, 2024) was an American politician who was a Mississippi State Senator (1980–1984) from Grenada, Mississippi. From January 2004, Pittman was a Constituent Services/Special Project Consultant on Governor Haley Barbour's staff.

In 1982, Pittman ran unsuccessfully in the Democratic primary against Senator John C. Stennis. Because of the 1982 Stennis Race, Pittman is listed in Forrest Lamar Cooper's book, "Mississippi Trivia," as the Mississippian having received the most votes ever in any Democratic primary campaign against Stennis, receiving 33,651 votes. Stennis later defeated Barbour in the 1982 general election.

In 1983, Pittman was edged out in a crowded Democratic primary for Mississippi Secretary of State. Dick Molpus was ultimately elected Secretary of State where he served for 12 years.

In 1999 Pittman penned the Mississippi political slogan, "Me and My Truck Are For Amy Tuck".

In 2003, Pittman served as the statewide sign coordinator for the Barbour campaign. In 2002, he was a campaign staff member for Congressman Chip Pickering.

Pittman is best known as one of the Original Mississippi Singing Senators and still performed at various political functions. In 1997, Pittman was awarded the Mississippi Senate Distinguished Service Award for Public Service, selected by and from over 200 current and former living members of the Mississippi State Senate.

Pittman received his undergraduate degree from Delta State University, where he was a member of Pi Kappa Alpha.

Pittman died in Loudon, Tennessee on August 27, 2024, at the age of 76.
