= 1946 United States Senate elections =

- November 5, 1946
- Class 1

36 of the 96 seats in the United States Senate 49 seats needed for a majority
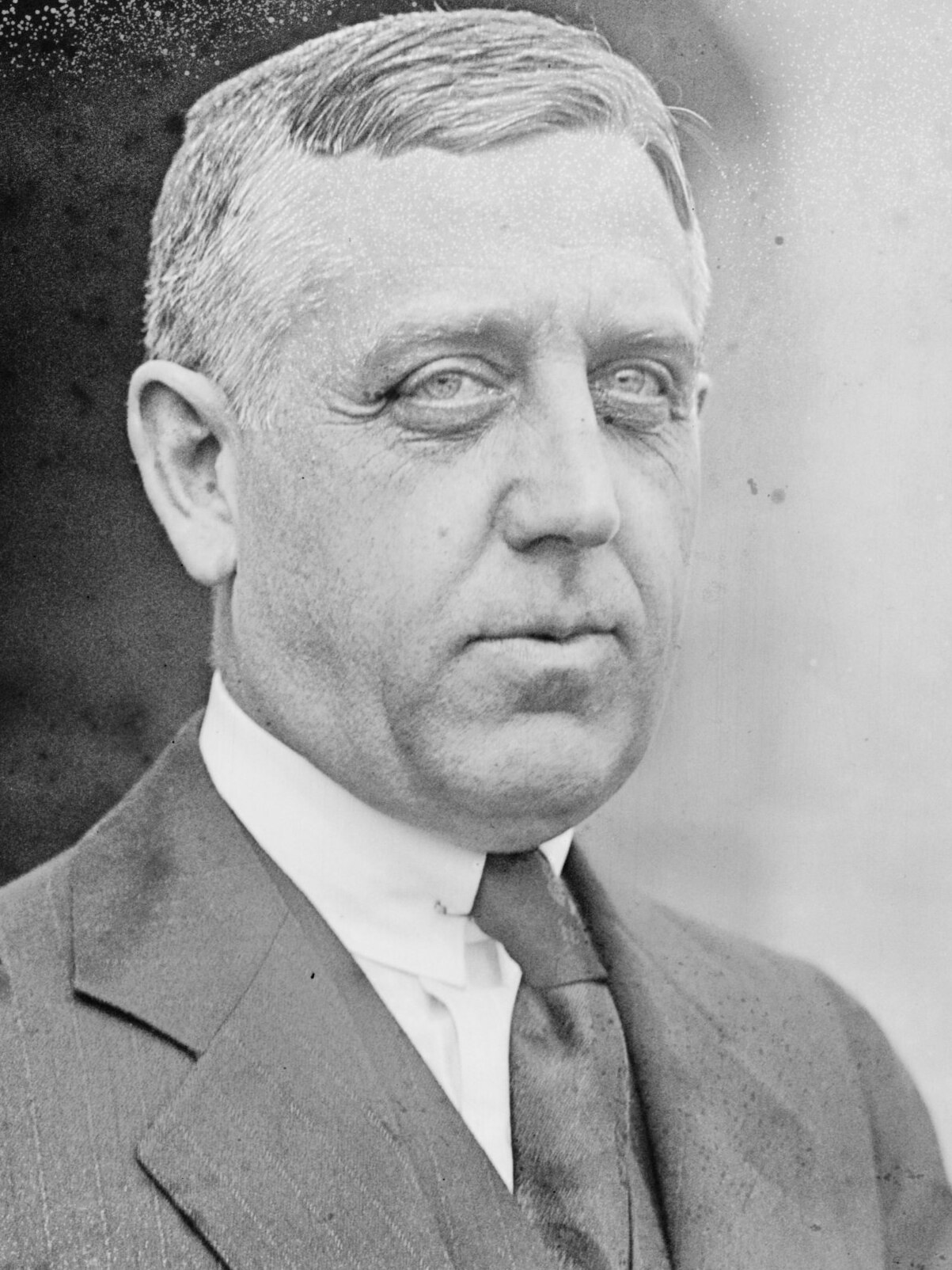

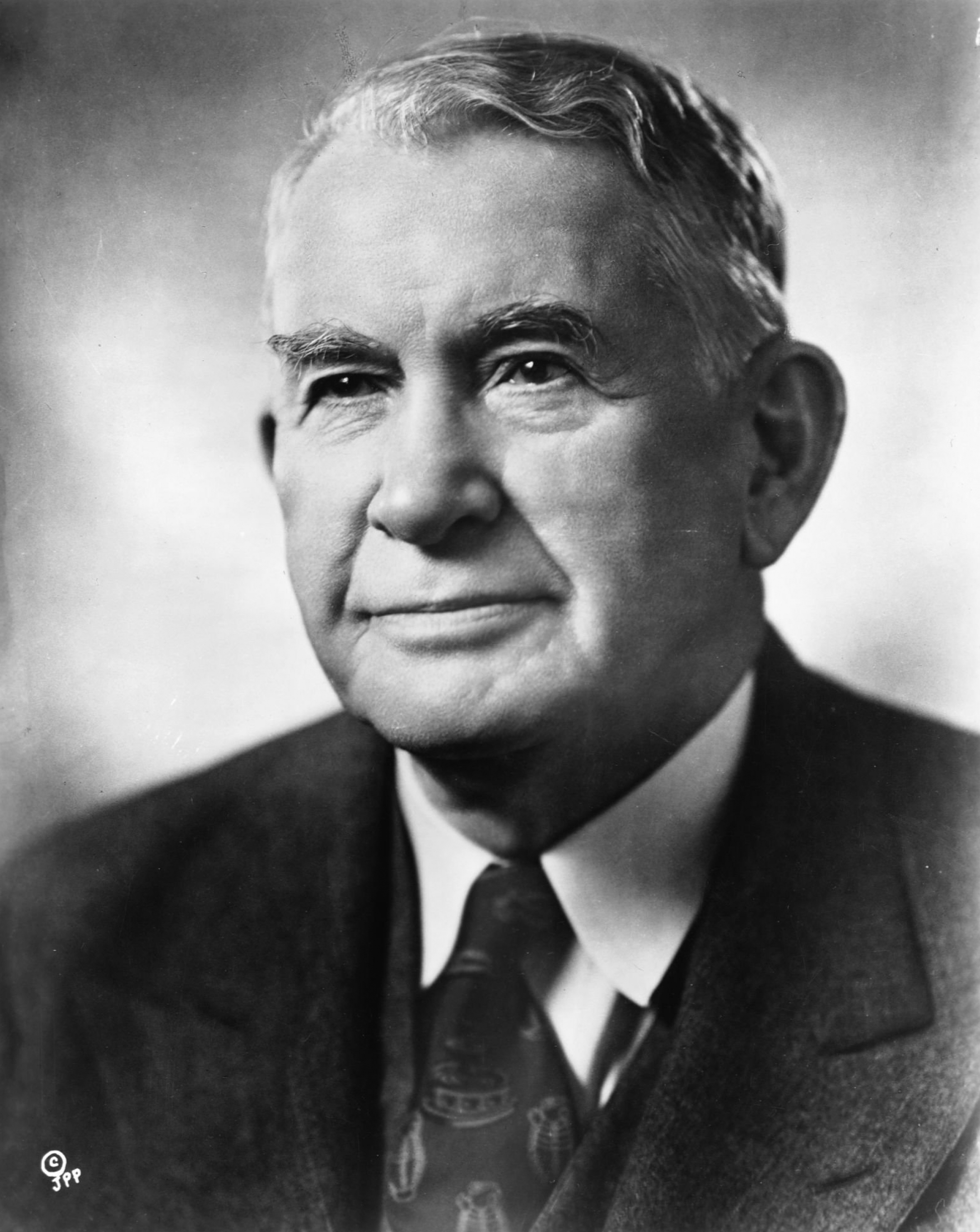
	Majority party	Minority party
Leader	Wallace White	Alben Barkley
Party	Republican	Democratic
Leader since	February 25, 1944	July 22, 1937
Leader's seat	Maine	Kentucky
Seats before	39	56
Seats won	51	45
Seat change	▲12	▼11
Popular vote	15,489,926	12,062,433
Percentage	54.0%	42.0%
Seats up	11	24
Races won	23	13
	Third party
Party	Progressive
Seats before	1
Seats won	0
Seat change	▼1
Seats up	1
Races won	0
- Results of the elections: Democratic hold Republican gain Republican hold No election Rectangular inset (N. Dak. and Va.): both seats up for election
Majority Leader before election
Alben Barkley
Democratic
Elected Majority Leader
Wallace White
Republican

The 1946 United States Senate elections were held November 5, 1946, in the middle of Democratic President Harry S. Truman's first term after Roosevelt's death. The 32 seats of Class 1 were contested in regular elections, and four special elections were held to fill vacancies. The Republicans took control of the Senate by picking up twelve seats, mostly from the Democrats. This was the first time since 1932 that the Republicans had held the Senate, recovering from a low of 16 seats following the 1936 elections.

== Events of the election ==
The vote was largely seen as a referendum on Truman, whose approval rating had sunk to 32% over the president's controversial handling of the United States strike wave of 1945–1946, such as a nationwide railroad strike in May, at a time when Americans depended on train service for both commuter and long-distance travel. Just as damaging was Truman's back-and-forth over whether to end unpopular wartime price controls to handle shortages, particularly in foodstuffs. For example, price controls on beef had led to a "hamburger famine," but when Truman, in a surprise move, lifted the controls on October 14—just weeks before the election—meat prices shot up to record levels.

This is only one of two occasions in U.S. history that 10 or more Senate seats changed hands in a midterm election (the other being in 1958), and also one of five occasions where 10 or more Senate seats changed hands in any election, with the other occasions being in 1920, 1932, 1958, and 1980.

Truman's lack of popular support is widely seen as the reason for the Democrats' congressional defeat, the largest since they were trounced in the 1928 pro-Republican wave that brought Herbert Hoover to power. For the first time since before the Great Depression, Republicans were seen as the party that could best handle the American economy.

However, the Republicans also benefited from a good map, as the majority of the one-third of Senate seats up for election that year were held by Democrats. Besides the Republicans being able to hold onto all of their seats, this was the party's largest Senate gain since 1920.

== Results summary ==
↓
45	51
Democratic	Republican

Colored shading indicates party with largest share of that row.

Parties				Total
Parties	Democratic	Republican	Other	Total
Last elections (1944)	57	38	1	96
Before these elections	56	39	1	96
Not up	32	28	0	60
Up	24	11	1	36
Class 1 (1940→1946)	21	10	1	32
Special: Class 2	3	1	—	4
Incumbent retired	4	4	—	8
Held by same party	3	4	—	7
Replaced by other party	▼1 Democrat replaced by ▲1 Republican		—	1
Result	3	5	0	8
Incumbent ran	20	7	1	28
Won re-election	9	6	0	16
Lost re-election	▼7 Democrats replaced by ▲7 Republicans		—	7
Lost renomination but held by same party	1	1	—	2
Lost (re)nomination and party lost	▼3 Democrats replaced by ▲3 Republicans ▼1 Progressive replaced by ▲1 Republican			4
Result	10	18	0	28
Total elected	13	23	0	36
Net change	▼11	▲12	▼1	12
Nationwide vote	12,062,433	15,489,926	1,142,765	28,695,124
Share	42.04%	53.98%	3.98%	100%
Result	45	51	0	96

Source: Clerk of the U.S. House of Representatives

== Gains, losses, and holds ==
=== Retirements ===
Three Republicans and five Democrats retired instead of seeking re-election.

State	Senator	Replaced by
Alabama (special)	George R. Swift	John Sparkman
Connecticut	Thomas C. Hart	Raymond E. Baldwin
Indiana	Raymond E. Willis	William E. Jenner
Kentucky (special)	William A. Stanfill	John Sherman Cooper
New York	James M. Mead	Irving Ives
Ohio	James W. Huffman	John W. Bricker
Rhode Island	Peter G. Gerry	J. Howard McGrath
Virginia (special)	Thomas G. Burch	A. Willis Robertson

=== Defeats ===
One Republican, one Progressive, and ten Democrats sought re-election but lost in the primary or general election.

State	Senator	Replaced by
Delaware	James M. Tunnell	John J. Williams
Idaho (special)	Charles C. Gossett	Henry Dworshak
Maryland	George L. P. Radcliffe	Herbert O'Conor
Massachusetts	David I. Walsh	Henry Cabot Lodge Jr.
Minnesota	Henrik Shipstead	Edward J. Thye
Missouri	Frank P. Briggs	James P. Kem
Montana	Burton K. Wheeler	Zales Ecton
Nevada	Edward P. Carville	George W. Malone
Pennsylvania	Joseph F. Guffey	Edward Martin
Utah	Abe Murdock	Arthur V. Watkins
Washington	Hugh Mitchell	Harry P. Cain
Wisconsin	Robert M. La Follette Jr.	Joseph McCarthy

=== Post election changes ===
State	Senator	Replaced by
Louisiana	John H. Overton	William C. Feazel
South Dakota	Harlan J. Bushfield	Vera C. Bushfield
Mississippi	Theodore G. Bilbo	John C. Stennis

== Change in composition ==
=== Before the elections ===
		D_{1}	D_{2}	D_{3}	D_{4}	D_{5}	D_{6}	D_{7}	D_{8}
D_{18}	D_{17}	D_{16}	D_{15}	D_{14}	D_{13}	D_{12}	D_{11}	D_{10}	D_{9}
D_{19}	D_{20}	D_{21}	D_{22}	D_{23}	D_{24}	D_{25}	D_{26}	D_{27}	D_{28}
D_{38} Md. Ran	D_{37} Idaho (sp); Ran	D_{36} Fla. Ran	D_{35} Del. Ran	D_{34} Ariz. Ran	D_{33} Ala. (sp); Retired	D_{32}	D_{31}	D_{30}	D_{29}
D_{39} Mass. Ran	D_{40} Miss. Ran	D_{41} Mo. Ran	D_{42} Mont. Ran	D_{43} Nev. Ran	D_{44} N.M. Ran	D_{45} N.Y. Retired	D_{46} Ohio (reg); Ohio (sp); Retired	D_{47} Pa. Ran	D_{48} R.I. Retired
Majority →									D_{49} Tenn. Ran
R_{39} Vt. Ran	P_{1} Wis. Ran	D_{56} Wyo. Ran	D_{55} W.Va. Ran	D_{54} Wash. Ran	D_{53} Va. (sp); Retired	D_{52} Va. (reg); Ran	D_{51} Utah; Ran	D_{50} Texas; Ran	D_{49} Tenn. Ran
R_{38} N.D. (reg); Ran	R_{37} N.J. Ran	R_{36} Neb. Ran	R_{35} Minn. Ran	R_{34} Mich. Ran	R_{33} Maine; Ran	R_{32} Ky. (sp); Retired	R_{31} Ind. Retired	R_{30} Conn. (reg); Conn. (sp); Retired	R_{29} Calif. (reg); Calif. (sp); Ran
R_{19}	R_{20}	R_{21}	R_{22}	R_{23}	R_{24}	R_{25}	R_{26}	R_{27}	R_{28}
R_{18}	R_{17}	R_{16}	R_{15}	R_{14}	R_{13}	R_{12}	R_{11}	R_{10}	R_{9}
		R_{1} N.D. (sp); Elected (Note: Appointee elected to remainder of term in the North Dakota special election of June 25, 1946.)	R_{2}	R_{3}	R_{4}	R_{5}	R_{6}	R_{7}	R_{8}

=== Election results ===
		D_{1}	D_{2}	D_{3}	D_{4}	D_{5}	D_{6}	D_{7}	D_{8}
D_{18}	D_{17}	D_{16}	D_{15}	D_{14}	D_{13}	D_{12}	D_{11}	D_{10}	D_{9}
D_{19}	D_{20}	D_{21}	D_{22}	D_{23}	D_{24}	D_{25}	D_{26}	D_{27}	D_{28}
D_{38} N.M. Re-elected	D_{37} Miss. Re-elected	D_{36} Md. Hold	D_{35} Fla. Elected (Note: Appointee elected)	D_{34} Ariz. Re-elected	D_{33} Ala. (sp); Hold	D_{32}	D_{31}	D_{30}	D_{29}
D_{39} R.I. Hold	D_{40} Tenn. Re-elected	D_{41} Texas; Re-elected	D_{42} Va. (reg); Re-elected	D_{43} Va. (sp); Hold	D_{44} W.Va. Re-elected	D_{45} Wyo. Re-elected	R_{51} Wis. Gain	R_{50} Wash. Gain	R_{49} Utah; Gain
Majority →									R_{49} Utah; Gain
R_{39} Vt. Elected	R_{40} Del. Gain	R_{41} Idaho (sp); Gain	R_{42} Mass. Gain	R_{43} Mo. Gain (Note: Appointee defeated)	R_{44} Mont. Gain	R_{45} Nev. Gain	R_{46} N.Y. Gain	R_{47} Ohio (reg); Gain Ohio (sp); Gain	R_{48} Pa. Gain
R_{38} N.D. (reg); Re-elected	R_{37} N.J. Re-elected	R_{36} Neb. Re-elected	R_{35} Minn. Hold	R_{34} Mich. Re-elected	R_{33} Maine; Re-elected	R_{32} Ky. (sp); Hold	R_{31} Ind. Hold	R_{30} Conn. (reg); Conn. (sp); Hold	R_{29} Calif. (reg); Calif. (sp); Elected
R_{19}	R_{20}	R_{21}	R_{22}	R_{23}	R_{24}	R_{25}	R_{26}	R_{27}	R_{28}
R_{18}	R_{17}	R_{16}	R_{15}	R_{14}	R_{13}	R_{12}	R_{11}	R_{10}	R_{9}
		R_{1}	R_{2}	R_{3}	R_{4}	R_{5}	R_{6}	R_{7}	R_{8}

Key

D_{#}	Democratic
P_{#}	Progressive
R_{#}	Republican

== Race summaries ==
=== Special elections during the 79th Congress ===
In these special elections, the winner was seated during 1946, ordered by election date, then state.

State	Incumbent			Results	Candidates
State	Senator	Party	Electoral history	Results	Candidates
North Dakota (Class 3)	Milton Young	Republican	1945 (Appointed)	Interim appointee elected June 25, 1946.	▌ ✓ Milton Young (Republican) 55.5%; ▌William Lanier (Democratic) 27.4%; ▌Gerald Nye (Independent) 15.2%
Alabama (Class 2)	George R. Swift	Democratic	1946 (Appointed)	Interim appointee retired. New senator elected November 5, 1946. Democratic hold.	▌ ✓ John Sparkman (Democratic); Unopposed
California (Class 1)	William Knowland	Republican	1945 (Appointed)	Interim appointee elected November 5, 1946. Winner also elected to next term; see below.	▌ ✓ William Knowland (Republican) 74.3%; ▌Will Rogers Jr. (Democratic) 15.9%; ▌George H. McLain (Democratic) 3.12%
Connecticut (Class 1)	Thomas C. Hart	Republican	1945 (Appointed)	Interim appointee retired. New senator elected November 5, 1946. Republican hold. Winner also elected to next term; see below.	▌ ✓ Raymond E. Baldwin (Republican) 55.8%; ▌Joseph M. Tone (Democratic) 41.0%; ▌Frederic C. Smedley (Socialist) 3.2%
Idaho (Class 2)	Charles C. Gossett	Democratic	1945 (Appointed)	Interim appointee lost nomination. New senator elected November 5, 1946. Republican gain.	▌ ✓ Henry Dworshak (Republican) 58.6%; ▌George E. Donart (Democratic) 41.4%
Kentucky (Class 2)	William A. Stanfill	Republican	1945 (Appointed)	Interim appointee retired. New senator elected November 5, 1946. Republican hold.	▌ ✓ John Sherman Cooper (Republican) 53.3%; ▌John Y. Brown Sr. (Democratic) 46.5%
Ohio (Class 1)	James W. Huffman	Democratic	1945 (Appointed)	Interim appointee declined to run in the special election. New senator elected November 5, 1946. Republican gain. Winner was not elected to the next term; see below.	▌ ✓ Kingsley A. Taft (Republican) 56.2%; ▌Henry P. Webber (Democratic) 43.8%
Virginia (Class 2)	Thomas G. Burch	Democratic	1946 (Appointed)	Interim appointee retired. New senator elected November 5, 1946. Democratic hold.	▌ ✓ A. Willis Robertson (Democratic) 68.2%; ▌Robert H. Woods (Republican) 29.0%

=== Races leading to the 80th Congress ===
In these general elections, the winners were elected for the term beginning January 3, 1947; ordered by state.

All of the elections involved the Class 1 seats.

State	Incumbent			Results	Candidates
State	Senator	Party	Electoral history	Results	Candidates
Arizona	Ernest McFarland	Democratic	1940	Incumbent re-elected.	▌ ✓ Ernest McFarland (Democratic) 69.2%; ▌Ward S. Powers 30.1%
California	William Knowland	Republican	1945 (Appointed)	Interim appointee elected. Winner also elected to finish term; see above.	▌ ✓ William Knowland (Republican) 54.1%; ▌Will Rogers Jr. (Democratic) 44.2%; ▌Douglas Corrigan (Prohibition) 1.62%
Connecticut	Thomas C. Hart	Republican	1945 (Appointed)	Interim appointee retired. New senator elected. Republican hold. Winner also elected to finish term; see above.	▌ ✓ Raymond E. Baldwin (Republican) 55.8%; ▌Wilbur Lucius Cross (Democratic) 40.5%; ▌Frederic C. Smedley (Socialist) 3.3%
Delaware	James M. Tunnell	Democratic	1940	Incumbent lost re-election. New senator elected. Republican gain.	▌ ✓ John J. Williams (Republican) 55.2%; ▌James M. Tunnell (Democratic) 44.9%
Florida	Spessard Holland	Democratic	1946 (Appointed)	Interim appointee elected.	▌ ✓ Spessard Holland (Democratic) 78.7%; ▌J. Harry Schad (Republican) 21.4%
Indiana	Raymond E. Willis	Republican	1940	Incumbent retired. New senator elected. Republican hold.	▌ ✓ William E. Jenner (Republican) 54.9%; ▌M. Clifford Townsend (Democratic) 43.4%
Maine	Owen Brewster	Republican	1940	Incumbent re-elected.	▌ ✓ Owen Brewster (Republican) 63.6%; ▌Peter M. MacDonald (Democratic) 36.5%
Maryland	George L. P. Radcliffe	Democratic	1934; 1940	Incumbent lost renomination. New senator elected. Democratic hold.	▌ ✓ Herbert O'Conor (Democratic) 50.2%; ▌D. John Markey (Republican) 49.8%
Massachusetts	David I. Walsh	Democratic	1918; 1924 (Lost); 1926 (special); 1928; 1934; 1940	Incumbent lost re-election. New senator elected. Republican gain.	▌ ✓ Henry Cabot Lodge Jr. (Republican) 59.6%; ▌David I. Walsh (Democratic) 39.7%
Michigan	Arthur Vandenberg	Republican	1928 (special); 1928; 1934; 1940	Incumbent re-elected.	▌ ✓ Arthur Vandenberg (Republican) 67.1%; ▌James H. Lee (Democratic) 32.0%
Minnesota	Henrik Shipstead	Republican	1922; 1928; 1934; 1940	Incumbent lost renomination. New senator elected. Republican hold.	▌ ✓ Edward J. Thye (Republican) 58.9%; ▌Theodore Jorgenson (DFL) 39.8%
Mississippi	Theodore G. Bilbo	Democratic	1934; 1940	Incumbent re-elected.	▌ ✓ Theodore G. Bilbo (Democratic); Unopposed
Missouri	Frank P. Briggs	Democratic	1945 (Appointed)	Interim appointee lost election. New senator elected. Republican gain.	▌ ✓ James P. Kem (Republican) 52.7%; ▌Frank P. Briggs (Democratic) 47.1%
Montana	Burton K. Wheeler	Democratic	1922; 1928; 1934; 1940	Incumbent lost renomination. New senator elected. Republican gain.	▌ ✓ Zales Ecton (Republican) 53.5%; ▌Leif Erickson (Democratic) 45.4%
Nebraska	Hugh A. Butler	Republican	1940	Incumbent re-elected.	▌ ✓ Hugh A. Butler (Republican) 70.8%; ▌John E. Mekota (Democratic) 29.2%
Nevada	Edward P. Carville	Democratic	1945 (Appointed)	Incumbent lost renomination. New senator elected. Republican gain.	▌ ✓ George W. Malone (Republican) 55.2%; ▌Berkeley L. Bunker (Democratic) 44.8%
New Jersey	H. Alexander Smith	Republican	1944 (special)	Incumbent re-elected.	▌ ✓ H. Alexander Smith (Republican) 58.5%; ▌George E. Brunner (Democratic) 40.1%
New Mexico	Dennis Chávez	Democratic	1935 (Appointed); 1936 (special); 1940	Incumbent re-elected.	▌ ✓ Dennis Chávez (Democratic) 51.5%; ▌Patrick J. Hurley (Republican) 48.5%
New York	James M. Mead	Democratic	1940	Incumbent retired to run for New York Governor. New senator elected. Republican gain.	▌ ✓ Irving Ives (Republican) 52.6%; ▌Herbert H. Lehman (Democratic) 47.6%
North Dakota	William Langer	Republican	1940	Incumbent re-elected.	▌ ✓ William Langer (Republican) 53.3%; ▌Arthur E. Thompson (Independent) 23.5%; ▌Abner B. Larson (Democratic) 23.2%
Ohio	James W. Huffman	Democratic	1945 (Appointed)	Interim appointee lost election. New senator elected. Republican gain. Winner was not elected to finish the term; see above.	▌ ✓ John W. Bricker (Republican) 57.0%; ▌James W. Huffman (Democratic) 42.4%
Pennsylvania	Joseph F. Guffey	Democratic	1934; 1940	Incumbent lost re-election. New senator elected. Republican gain.	▌ ✓ Edward Martin (Republican) 59.3%; ▌Joseph F. Guffey (Democratic) 39.8%
Rhode Island	Peter G. Gerry	Democratic	1934; 1940	Incumbent retired. New senator elected. Democratic hold.	▌ ✓ J. Howard McGrath (Democratic) 55.1%; ▌W. Gurnee Dwyer (Republican) 44.9%
Tennessee	Kenneth McKellar	Democratic	1916; 1922; 1928; 1934; 1940	Incumbent re-elected.	▌ ✓ Kenneth McKellar (Democratic) 66.6%; ▌William B. Ladd (Republican) 26.2%
Texas	Tom Connally	Democratic	1928; 1934; 1940	Incumbent re-elected.	▌ ✓ Tom Connally (Democratic) 88.5%; ▌Murray C. Sells (Republican) 11.5%
Utah	Abe Murdock	Democratic	1940	Incumbent lost re-election. New senator elected. Republican gain.	▌ ✓ Arthur V. Watkins (Republican) 51.2%; ▌Abe Murdock (Democratic) 48.8%
Vermont	Ralph Flanders	Republican	1946 (Appointed)	Interim appointee elected.	▌ ✓ Ralph Flanders (Republican) 74.6%; ▌Charles P. McDevitt (Democratic) 25.4%
Virginia	Harry F. Byrd	Democratic	1933 (Appointed); 1933 (special); 1934; 1940	Incumbent re-elected.	▌ ✓ Harry F. Byrd (Democratic) 64.9%; ▌Lester S. Parsons (Republican) 30.5%
Washington	Hugh Mitchell	Democratic	1945 (Appointed)	Interim appointee lost election. New senator elected. Republican gain. Incumbent resigned December 25, 1946. Winner appointed December 26, 1946, to finish term.	▌ ✓ Harry P. Cain (Republican) 54.3%; ▌Hugh Mitchell (Democratic) 45.2%
West Virginia	Harley M. Kilgore	Democratic	1940	Incumbent re-elected.	▌ ✓ Harley M. Kilgore (Democratic) 50.3%; ▌Thomas Sweeney (Republican) 49.7%
Wisconsin	Robert M. La Follette Jr.	Progressive	1925 (special); 1928; 1934; 1940	Incumbent lost renomination as a Republican. New senator elected. Republican gain.	▌ ✓ Joseph McCarthy (Republican) 61.3%; ▌Howard J. McMurray (Democratic) 37.4%; ▌Edwin Knappe (Socialist) 1.2%
Wyoming	Joseph C. O'Mahoney	Democratic	1933 (Appointed); 1934; 1940	Incumbent re-elected.	▌ ✓ Joseph C. O'Mahoney (Democratic) 56.2%; ▌Harry B. Henderson (Republican) 43.8%

== Closest races ==
Ten races had a margin of victory under 10%:

State	Party of winner	Margin
Maryland	Democratic	0.4%
West Virginia	Democratic	0.6%
Utah	Republican (flip)	2.4%
New Mexico	Democratic	3.0%
New York	Republican (flip)	5.0%
Missouri	Republican (flip)	5.6% (Note: Missouri was the "tipping point" state.)
Kentucky	Republican	6.8%
Montana	Republican (flip)	8.1%
Washington	Republican (flip)	9.1%
California	Republican	9.9%

== Alabama (special) ==
1946 United States Senate special election in Alabama
- November 5, 1946
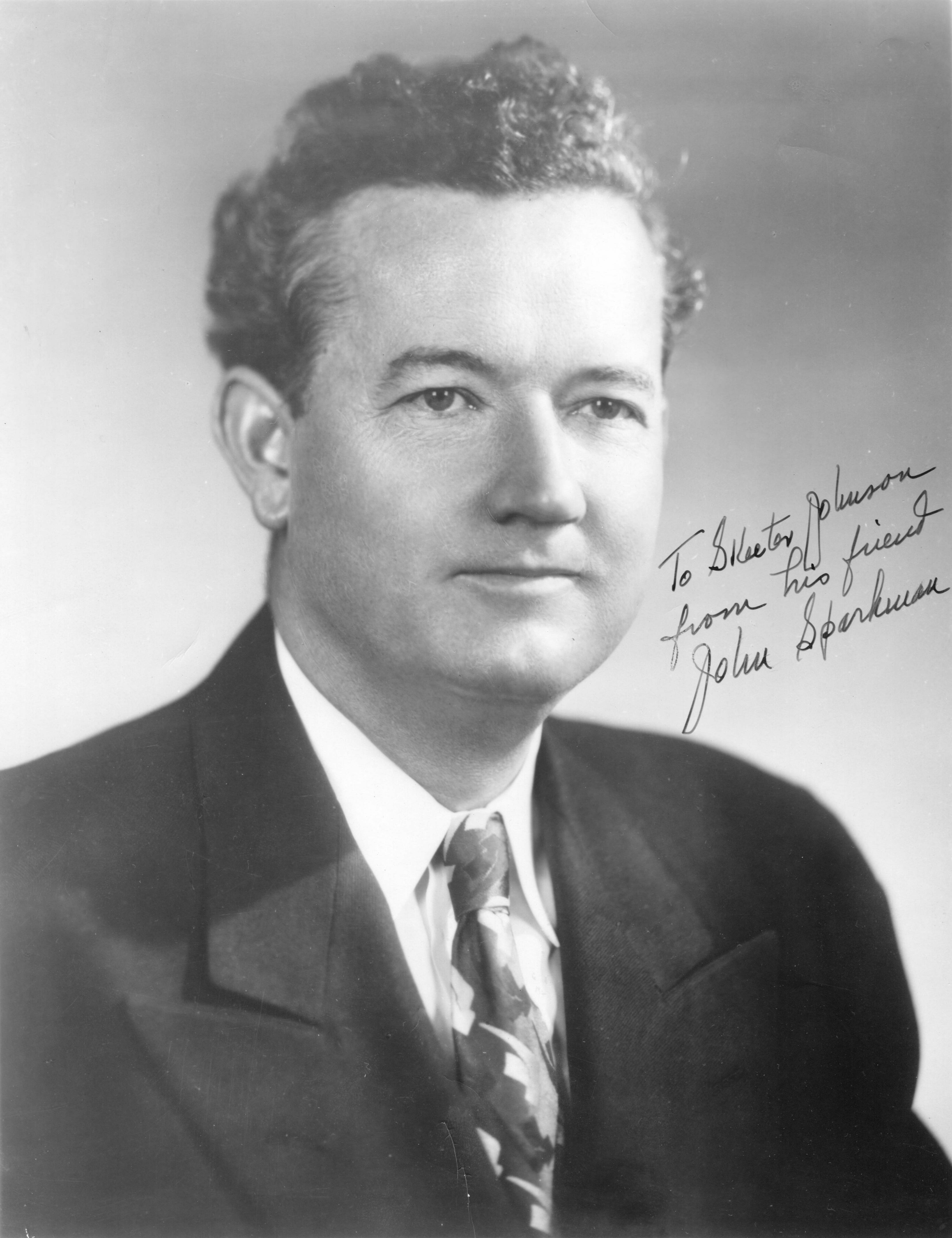
Nominee	John Sparkman
Party	Democratic
Popular vote	163,217
Percentage	100%
- County results Sparkman: 100%
U.S. senator before election
John Bankhead II
Democratic
Elected U.S. Senator
John Sparkman
Democratic

1946 Democratic U.S. Senate primary
Party	Candidate	Votes	%
Democratic	John Sparkman	85,049	50.14%
Democratic	James A. Simpson	46,762	27.57%
Democratic	Frank W. Boykin	35,982	21.21%
Democratic	Ted Allen	1,260	0.74%
Democratic	Thomas H. Maxwell	585	0.35%
Total votes		169,638	100.00%

1946 United States Senate special election in Alabama
Party	Candidate	Votes	%
Democratic	John Sparkman	163,217	100.00%
Democratic hold			

== Arizona ==
1946 United States Senate election in Arizona
- November 5, 1946
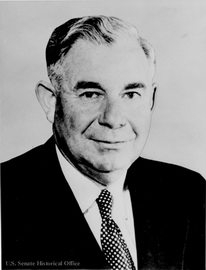

Nominee	Ernest McFarland	Ward S. Powers
Party	Democratic	Republican
Popular vote	80,415	35,022
Percentage	69.18%	30.13%
- County results McFarland: 60–70% 70–80% 80–90%
U.S. senator before election
Ernest McFarland
Democratic
Elected U.S. Senator
Ernest McFarland
Democratic

Incumbent Democrat Ernest McFarland ran for re-election to a second term, easily defeating Republican Ward S. Powers in the general election.

1946 United States Senate election in Arizona
Party	Candidate	Votes	%
Democratic	Ernest McFarland (incumbent)	80,415	69.18%
Republican	Ward S. Powers	35,022	30.13%
Communist	Morris Graham	802	0.69%
Majority		45,393	39.05%
Turnout		116,239	
Democratic hold			

== California ==
=== California (special) ===
==== Results ====
1946 U.S. Senate special election in California
Party	Candidate	Votes	%
Write-in	William F. Knowland (inc.)	425,273	74.31%
Write-in	Will Rogers Jr.	90,723	15.85%
Write-in	George H. McLain	17,883	3.13%
Write-in	Ellis E. Patterson	3,889	0.68%
Write-in	Douglas Corrigan	2,464	0.43%
Write-in	Vic Paulsen	1,616	0.28%
Write-in	Moody Staten	1,494	0.26%
Write-in	Hartley F. Peart	1,383	0.24%
Write-in	George C. Highley	1,268	0.22%
Write-in	James Moran	918	0.16%
Write-in	Ben Rinaldo	765	0.13%
Write-in	Aubrey D. Lewis	519	0.09%
Write-in	Frank Merriam	507	0.09%
Write-in	All others	23,619	4.13%
Total votes		572,321	100.00%

=== California (regular) ===
1946 United States Senate election in California
- November 5, 1946
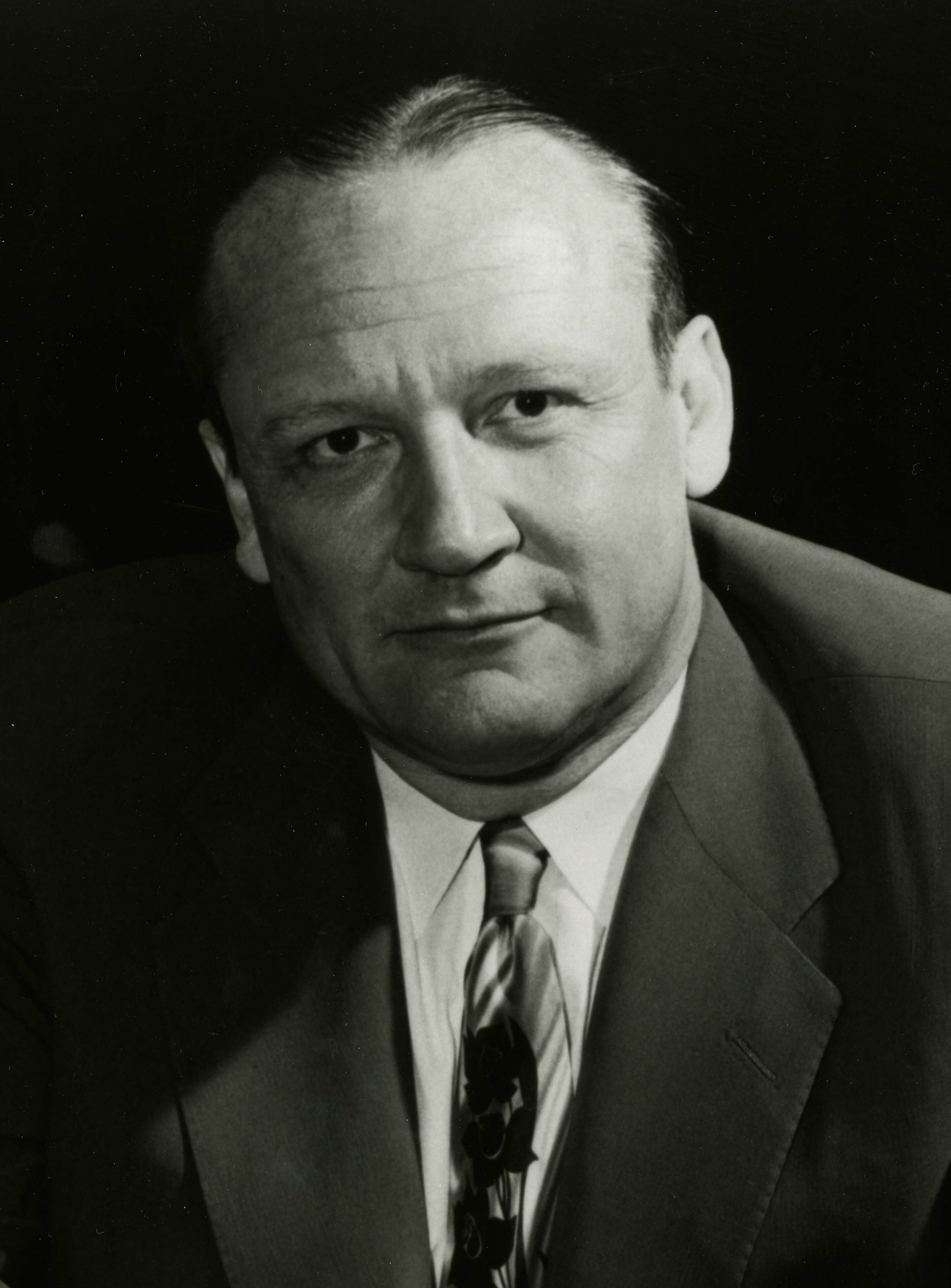

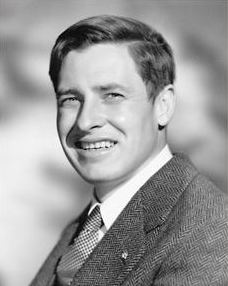
Nominee	William F. Knowland	Will Rogers Jr.
Party	Republican	Democratic
Popular vote	1,428,067	1,167,161
Percentage	54.10%	44.22%
- County results Knowland: 40–50% 50–60% 60–70% 70–80% Rogers: 50–60%
U.S. senator before election
William F. Knowland
Republican
Elected U.S. Senator
William F. Knowland
Republican

1946 United States Senate election in California
Party	Candidate	Votes	%
Republican	William Knowland (incumbent)	1,428,067	54.10%
Democratic	Will Rogers Jr.	1,167,161	44.22%
Prohibition	Douglas Corrigan	42,683	1.62%
Write-In	Herbert Steiner	156	0.01%
None	Scattering	1,398	0.05%
Majority		260,906	9.88%
Turnout		2,639,465	
Republican hold			

== Connecticut ==
There were 2 elections for the same seat due to the January 16, 1945, death of Democrat Francis T. Maloney. Republican Thomas C. Hart was appointed February 15, 1945, to continue the term, pending a special election. Republican Governor of Connecticut Raymond E. Baldwin won both elections, but resigned only three years after the election to become a state judge.

=== Connecticut (regular) ===
1946 United States Senate election in Connecticut
- November 5, 1946
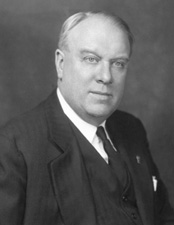

Nominee	Raymond E. Baldwin	Joseph M. Tone
Party	Republican	Democratic
Popular vote	381,328	276,424
Percentage	55.84%	40.48%
- Baldwin: 50–60% 60–70% 70–80% 80–90% 90–100% Tone: 50–60% 60–70%
U.S. senator before election
Thomas C. Hart
Republican
Elected U.S. Senator
Raymond E. Baldwin
Republican

1946 United States Senate election in Connecticut
Party	Candidate	Votes	%
Republican	Raymond E. Baldwin	381,328	55.84%
Democratic	Joseph M. Tone	276,424	40.48%
Socialist	Frederick C. Smedley	22,012	3.22%
Socialist Labor	John W. Aiken	3,156	0,46%
Majority		104,904	29.32%
Turnout		682,920	
Republican hold			

=== Connecticut (special) ===
1946 United States Senate special election in Connecticut
Party	Candidate	Votes	%
Republican	Raymond E. Baldwin	378,707	55.77%
Democratic	Wilbur Lucius Cross	278,188	40.97%
Socialist	Frederic C. Smedly	22,164	3.26%
Majority		100,519	14.80%
Turnout		679,059	
Republican hold			

== Delaware ==
1946 United States Senate election in Delaware
- November 5, 1946
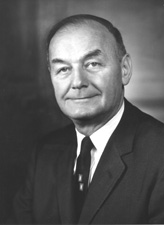

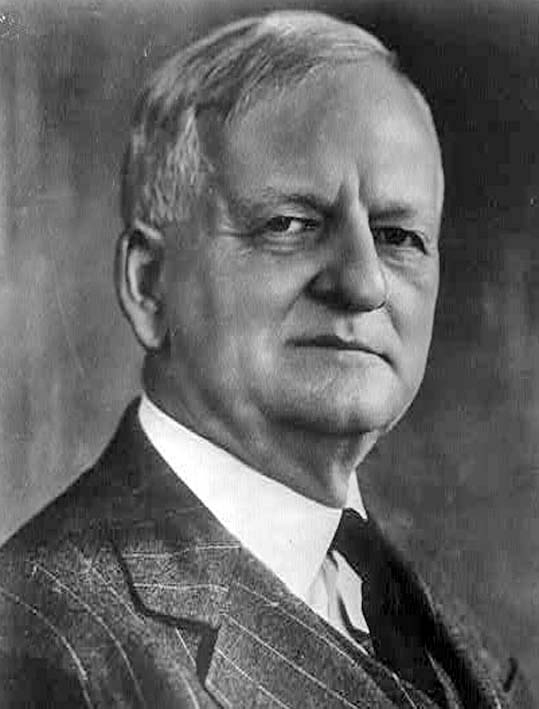
Nominee	John J. Williams	James M. Tunnell
Party	Republican	Democratic
Popular vote	62,603	50,910
Percentage	55.15%	44.85%
- County results Williams: 50–60%
U.S. senator before election
James M. Tunnell
Democratic
Elected U.S. Senator
John J. Williams
Republican

1946 United States Senate election in Delaware
Party	Candidate	Votes	%
Republican	John J. Williams	62,603	55.15%
Democratic	James M. Tunnell (incumbent)	50,910	44.85%
Majority		11,693	10.30%
Turnout		113,513	
Republican gain from Democratic			

== Florida ==
1946 United States Senate election in Florida
- November 5, 1946
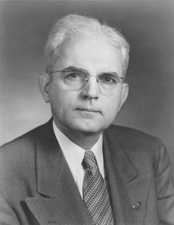

Nominee	Spessard Holland	J. Harry Schad
Party	Democratic	Republican
Popular vote	156,232	42,408
Percentage	78.65%	21.35%
- County results Holland: 50–60% 60–70% 70–80% 80–90% >90%
U.S. senator before election
Spessard Holland
Democratic
Elected U.S. Senator
Spessard Holland
Democratic

1946 United States Senate election in Florida
Party	Candidate	Votes	%
Democratic	Spessard Holland (incumbent)	156,232	78.65%
Republican	J. Harry Schad	42,408	21.35%
Majority		113,824	57.30%
Turnout		198,640	
Democratic hold			

== Idaho (special) ==
1946 United States Senate special election in Idaho
- November 5, 1946
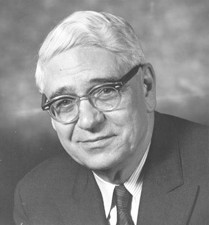
Nominee	Henry Dworshak	George E. Donart
Party	Republican	Democratic
Popular vote	105,523	74,629
Percentage	58.57%	41.43%
- County results Dworshak: 50–60% 60–70% 70–80% Donart: 50–60% 60–70%
Senator before election
Charles Gossett
Democratic
Elected Senator
Henry Dworshak
Republican

1946 United States Senate special election in Idaho
Party	Candidate	Votes	%
Republican	Henry Dworshak	105,523	58.57%
Democratic	George E. Donart	74,629	41.43%
Majority		30,894	17.14%
Turnout		180,152	
Republican gain from Democratic			

== Indiana ==
1946 United States Senate election in Indiana
- November 5, 1946
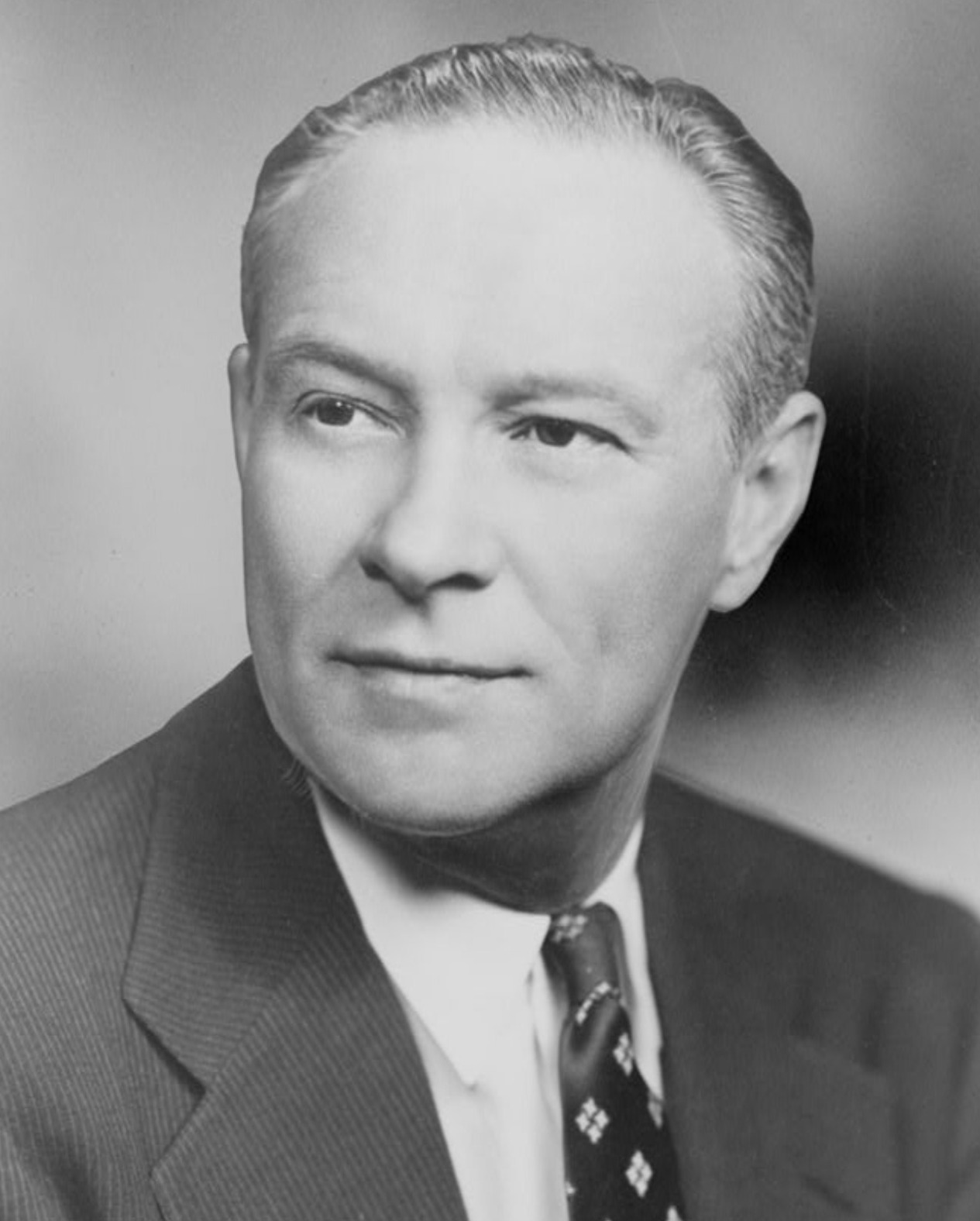

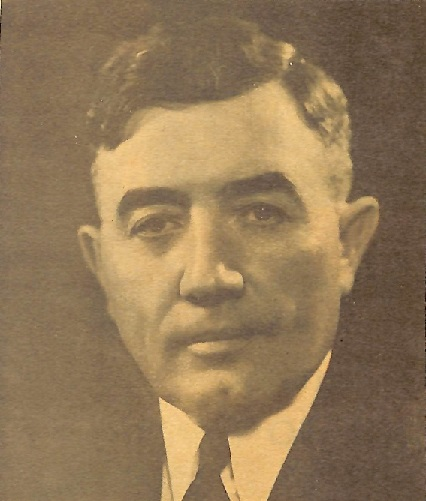
Nominee	William E. Jenner	M. Clifford Townsend
Party	Republican	Democratic
Popular vote	739,807	584,288
Percentage	54.91%	43.36%
- County results Jenner: 40–50% 50–60% 60–70% 70–80% Townsend: 40–50% 50–60%
U.S. senator before election
Raymond E. Willis
Republican
Elected U.S. Senator
William E. Jenner
Republican

1946 United States Senate election in Indiana
Party	Candidate	Votes	%
Republican	William E. Jenner	739,809	54.91%
Democratic	M. Clifford Townsend	584,288	43.36%
Prohibition	Elmer D. Riggs	21,008	1.56%
Socialist Labor	John Marion Morris	1,523	0.11%
Communist	Elmer G. Johnson	806	0.06%
Majority		155,521	15.55%
Turnout		1,347,434	
Republican hold			

== Kentucky (special) ==
1946 United States Senate special election in Kentucky
- November 5, 1946
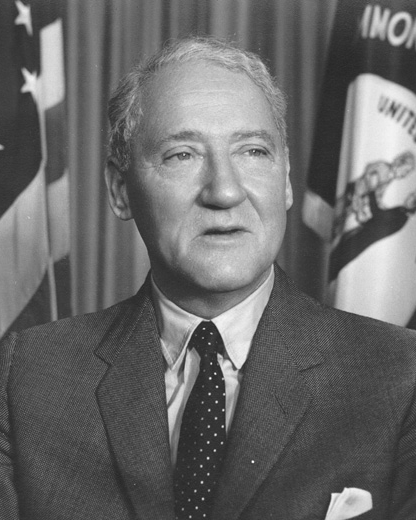

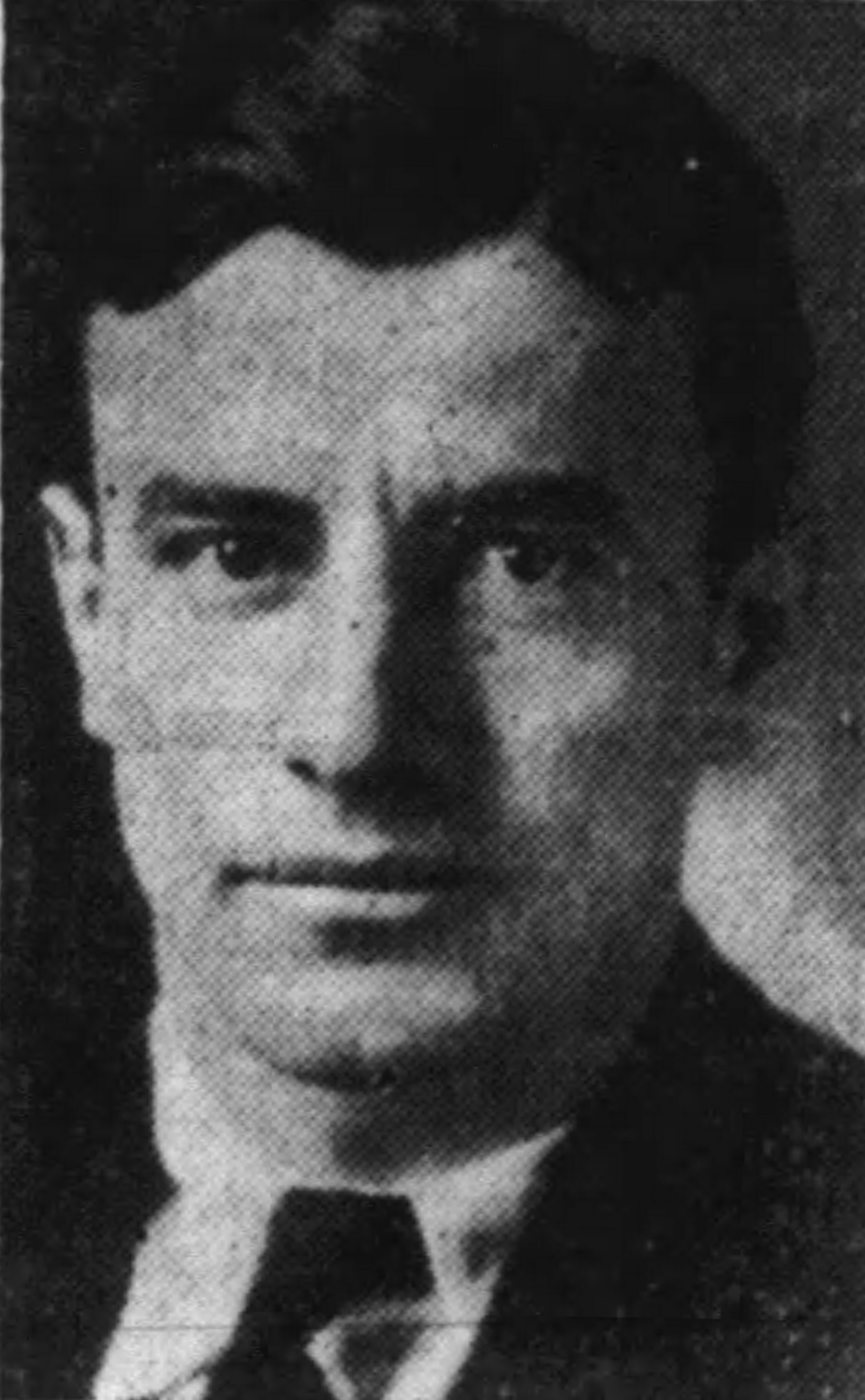
Nominee	John Sherman Cooper	John Y. Brown
Party	Republican	Democratic
Popular vote	327,652	285,829
Percentage	53.27%	46.47%
- County results Cooper: 50–60% 60–70% 70–80% 80–90% >90% Brown: 50–60% 60–70% 70–80% 80–90%
U.S. senator before election
William A. Stanfill
Republican
Elected U.S. Senator
John Sherman Cooper
Republican

1946 United States Senate special election in Kentucky
Party	Candidate	Votes	%
Republican	John Sherman Cooper	327,652	53.27%
Democratic	John Young Brown	285,829	46.47%
Socialist	W. E. Sandefur	1,638	0.27%
Majority		41,823	6.80%
Turnout		615,119	
Republican hold			

== Maine ==
1946 United States Senate election in Maine
- September 9, 1946
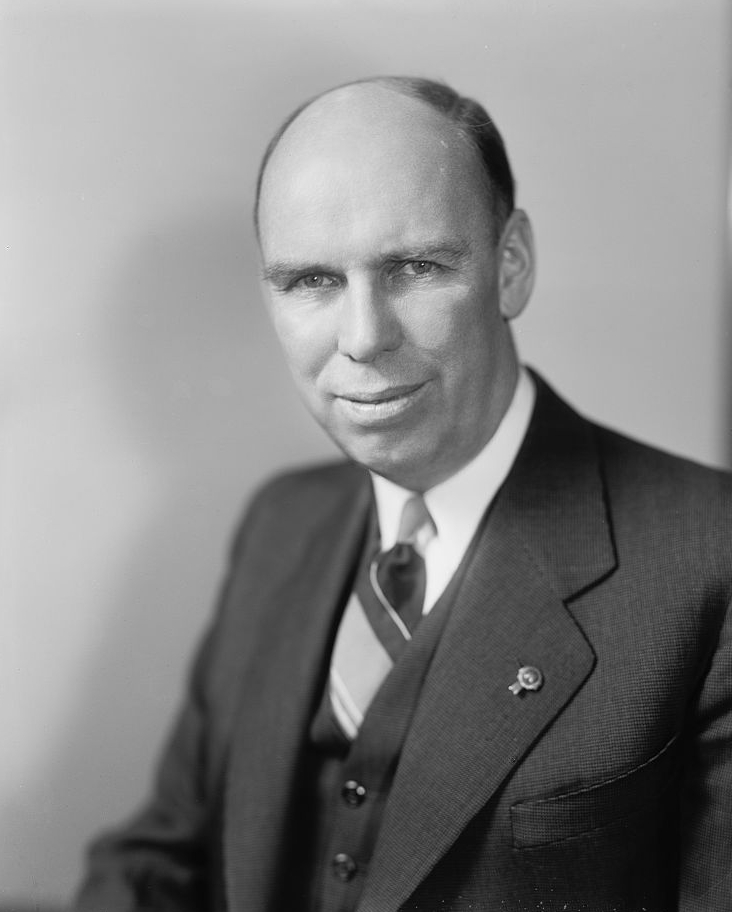

Nominee	Owen Brewster	Peter McDonald
Party	Republican	Democratic
Popular vote	111,215	82,665
Percentage	63.55%	36.45%
- County results Brewster: 50–60% 60–70% 70–80% 80–90% McDonald: 50–60%
U.S. senator before election
Owen Brewster
Republican
Elected U.S. Senator
Owen Brewster
Republican

1946 United States Senate election in Maine
Party	Candidate	Votes	%
Republican	Owen Brewster (incumbent)	111,215	63.55%
Democratic	Peter M. MacDonald	63,799	36.45%
Majority		47,416	27.10%
Turnout		175,014	
Republican hold			

== Maryland ==
1946 United States Senate election in Maryland
- November 5, 1946
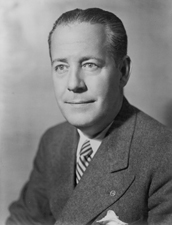

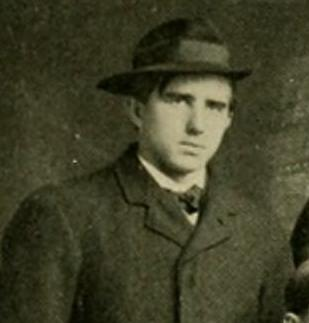
Nominee	Herbert O'Conor	D. John Markey
Party	Democratic	Republican
Popular vote	237,232	235,000
Percentage	50.24%	49.76%
- County results Markey: 50–60% 60–70% O'Conor: 50–60%
U.S. senator before election
George L. P. Radcliffe
Democratic
Elected U.S. Senator
Herbert O'Conor
Democratic

1946 United States Senate election in Maryland
Party	Candidate	Votes	%
Democratic	Herbert O'Conor	237,232	50.24%
Republican	D. John Markey	235,000	49.76%
Majority		2,232	0.48%
Turnout		472,232	
Democratic hold			

== Massachusetts ==
1946 United States Senate election in Massachusetts
- November 5, 1946
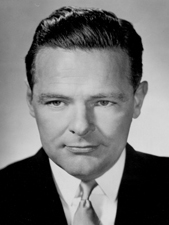

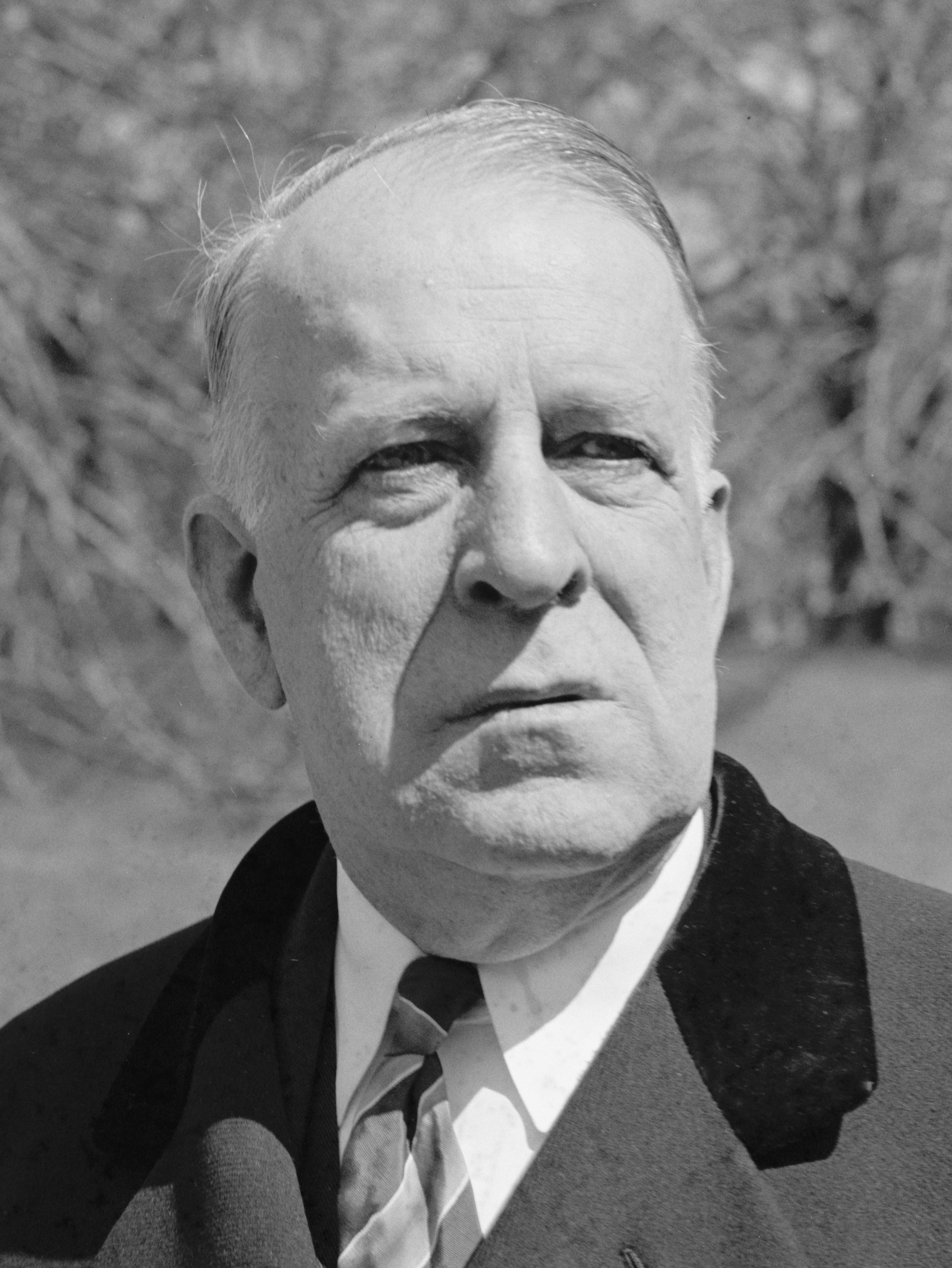
Nominee	Henry Cabot Lodge Jr.	David I. Walsh
Party	Republican	Democratic
Popular vote	989,736	660,200
Percentage	59.55%	39.72%
- Lodge: 40–50% 50–60% 60–70% 70–80% 80–90% 90–100% Walsh: 50–60% 60–70%
U.S. senator before election
David I. Walsh
Democratic
Elected U.S. Senator
Henry Cabot Lodge Jr.
Republican

Republican Henry Cabot Lodge Jr. defeated incumbent David I. Walsh.

1946 United States Senate election in Massachusetts
Party	Candidate	Votes	%
Republican	Henry Cabot Lodge Jr.	989,736	59.55
Democratic	David I. Walsh (incumbent)	660,200	39.72
Socialist Labor	Henning A. Blomen	9,221	0.56
Prohibition	Mark R. Shaw	2,898	0.17
Majority		329,536	19.83%
Turnout		1,662,055	
Republican gain from Democratic			

== Michigan ==
1946 United States Senate election in Michigan
- November 5, 1946
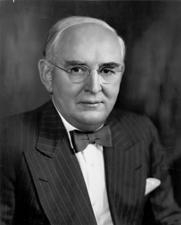

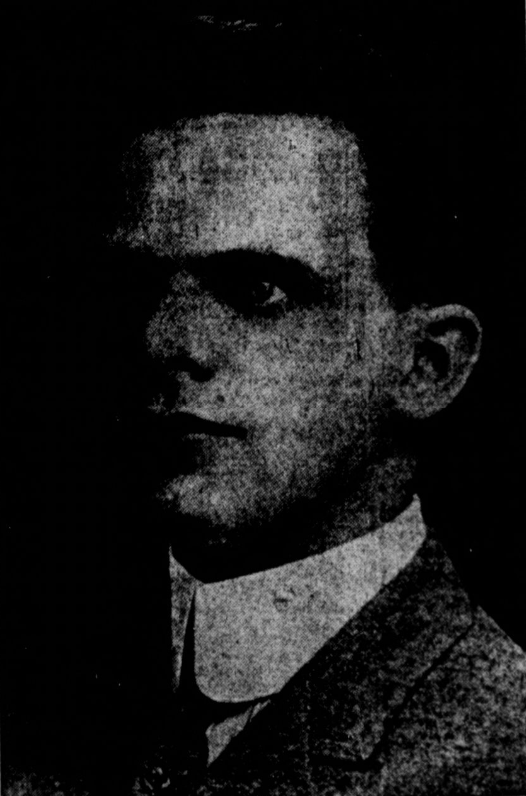
Nominee	Arthur Vandenberg	James H. Lee
Party	Republican	Democratic
Popular vote	1,085,570	517,923
Percentage	67.06%	32.00%
- County results Vandenberg: 50–60% 60–70% 70–80% 80–90%
U.S. senator before election
Arthur Vandenberg
Republican
Elected U.S. Senator
Arthur Vandenberg
Republican

1946 United States Senate election in Michigan
Party	Candidate	Votes	%
Republican	Arthur Vandenberg (incumbent)	1,985,570	67.06%
Democratic	James H. Lee	517,923	32.00%
Prohibition	Lawrence A. Ruble	8,109	0.50%
Socialist Labor	Theos A. Grove	4,572	0.28%
Communist	Hugo Beiswenger	2,546	0.16%
Majority		1,467,647	35.06%
Turnout		1,618,720	
Republican hold			

== Minnesota ==
1946 United States Senate election in Minnesota
- November 5, 1946
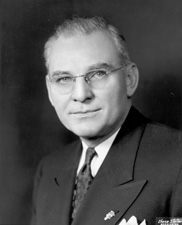
Nominee	Edward J. Thye	Theodore Jorgenson
Party	Republican	Democratic (DFL)
Popular vote	517,775	349,520
Percentage	58.92%	39.78%
- County results Thye: 50–60% 60–70% 70–80% 80–90% Jorgenson: 40–50% 50–60% 60–70%
U.S. senator before election
Henrik Shipstead
Republican
Elected U.S. Senator
Edward J. Thye
Republican

1946 United States Senate election in Minnesota
Party	Candidate	Votes	%
Republican	Edward John Thye	517,775	58.92%
Democratic (DFL)	Theodore Jorgenson	349,520	39.78%
Revolutionary Workers	Grace Carlson	11,421	1.30%
Write-In	Henrik Shipstead (incumbent)	15	0.00%
Majority		168,255	19.14%
Turnout		878,731	
Republican hold			

== Mississippi ==
1946 U.S. Senate Democratic primary in Mississippi
- July 2, 1946
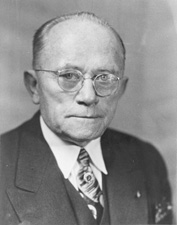

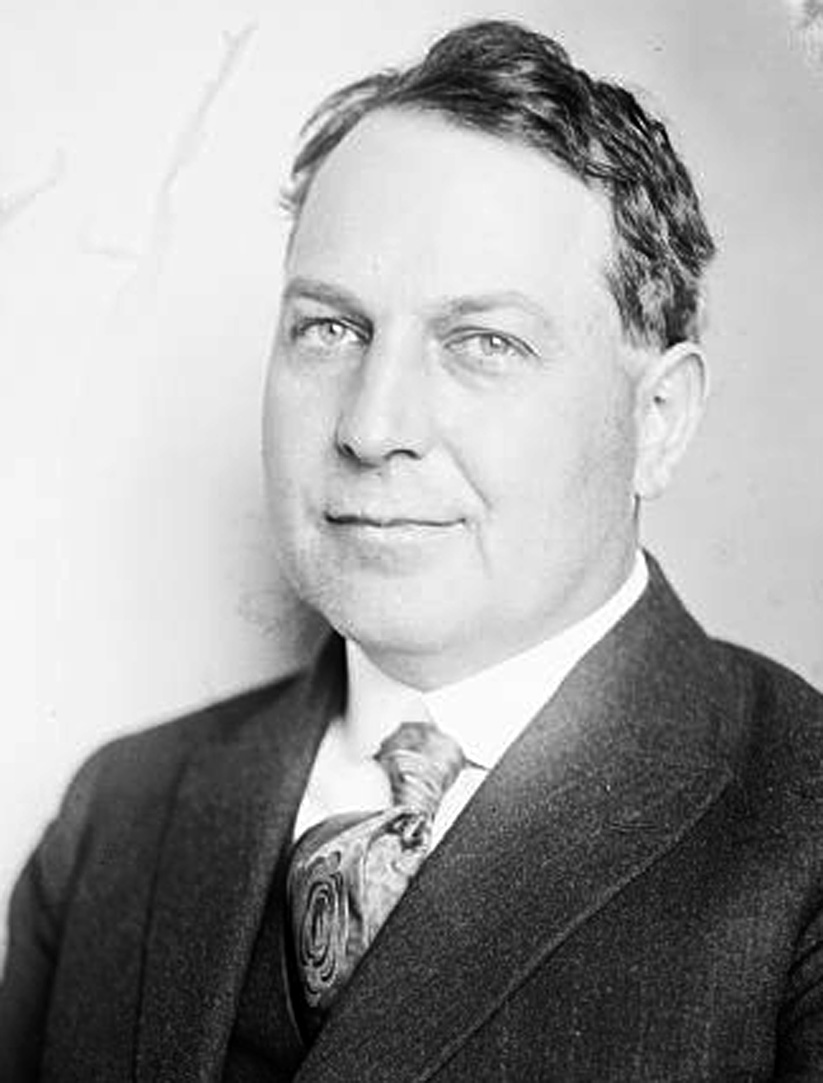

Nominee	Theodore G. Bilbo	Tom Ellis
Party	Democratic	Democratic
Popular vote	97,820	58,005
Percentage	51.00%	30.24%
Nominee	Ross A. Collins	Nelson T. Levings
Party	Democratic	Democratic
Popular vote	18,875	15,720
Percentage	9.84%	8.20%
- County results Bilbo: 30–40% 40–50% 50–60% 60–70% 70–80% 80–90% Ellis: 40–50% 50–60% 60–70%
U.S. senator before election
Theodore G. Bilbo
Democratic
Elected U.S. Senator
Theodore G. Bilbo
Democratic

1946 United States Senate election in Mississippi
Party	Candidate	Votes	%
Democratic	Theodore G. Bilbo (incumbent)	46,747	100.00%
Democratic hold			

== Missouri ==
1946 United States Senate election in Missouri
- November 5, 1946
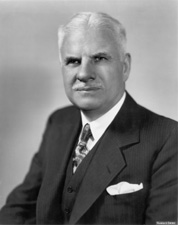

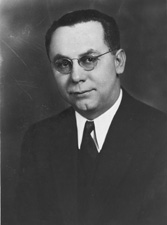
Nominee	James P. Kem	Frank P. Briggs
Party	Republican	Democratic
Popular vote	572,556	511,544
Percentage	52.71%	47.09%
- County results Kem: 50–60% 60–70% 70–80% 80–90% Briggs: 50–60% 60–70% 70–80% 80–90%
U.S. senator before election
Frank P. Briggs
Democratic
Elected U.S. Senator
James P. Kem
Republican

1946 United States Senate election in Missouri
Party	Candidate	Votes	%
Republican	James P. Kem	572,556	52.71%
Democratic	Frank P. Briggs (incumbent)	411,544	47.09%
Prohibition	Jackson	979	0.09%
Socialist	W. F. Rinck	887	0.08%
Socialist Labor	Baeff	275	0.03%
Majority		61,012	5.62%
Turnout		1,086,241	
Republican gain from Democratic			

== Montana ==
1946 United States Senate election in Montana
- November 5, 1946
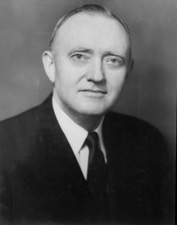

Nominee	Zales Ecton	Leif Erickson
Party	Republican	Democratic
Popular vote	101,901	86,476
Percentage	53.47%	45.38%
- County results Ecton: 50–60% 60–70% 70–80% Erickson: 40–50% 50–60% 60–70% No data
U.S. senator before election
Burton K. Wheeler
Democratic
Elected U.S. Senator
Zales Ecton
Republican

1946 United States Senate election in Montana
Party	Candidate	Votes	%
Republican	Zales Ecton	101,901	53.47%
Democratic	Leif Erickson	86,476	45.38%
Socialist	Floyd P. Jones	2,189	1.15%
Majority		15,425	8.09%
Turnout		190,566	
Republican gain from Democratic			

== Nebraska ==
1946 United States Senate election in Nebraska
- November 5, 1946
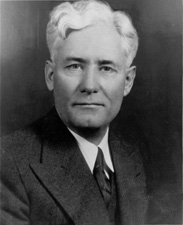

Nominee	Hugh A. Butler	John E. Mekota
Party	Republican	Democratic
Popular vote	271,208	111,751
Percentage	70.82%	29.18%
- County results Butler: 50–60% 60–70% 70–80% 80–90% Mekota: 60–70%
U.S. senator before election
Hugh A. Butler
Republican
Elected U.S. Senator
Hugh A. Butler
Republican

1946 United States Senate election in Nebraska
Party	Candidate	Votes	%
Republican	Hugh A. Butler (incumbent)	271,208	70.82%
Democratic	John E. Mekota	111,751	29.18%
Majority		159,457	41.64%
Turnout		382,958	
Republican hold			

== Nevada ==
1946 United States Senate election in Nevada
- November 5, 1946
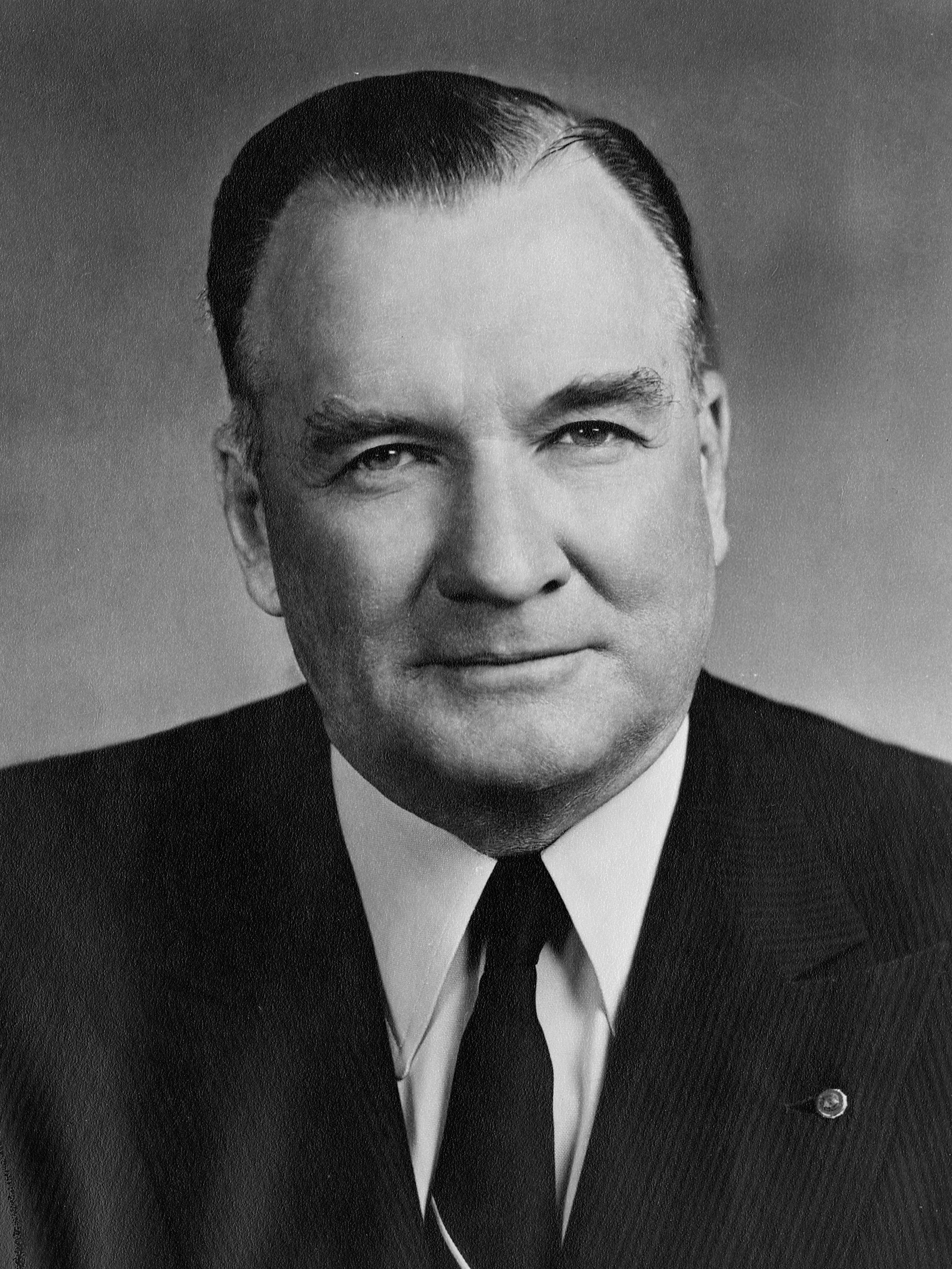

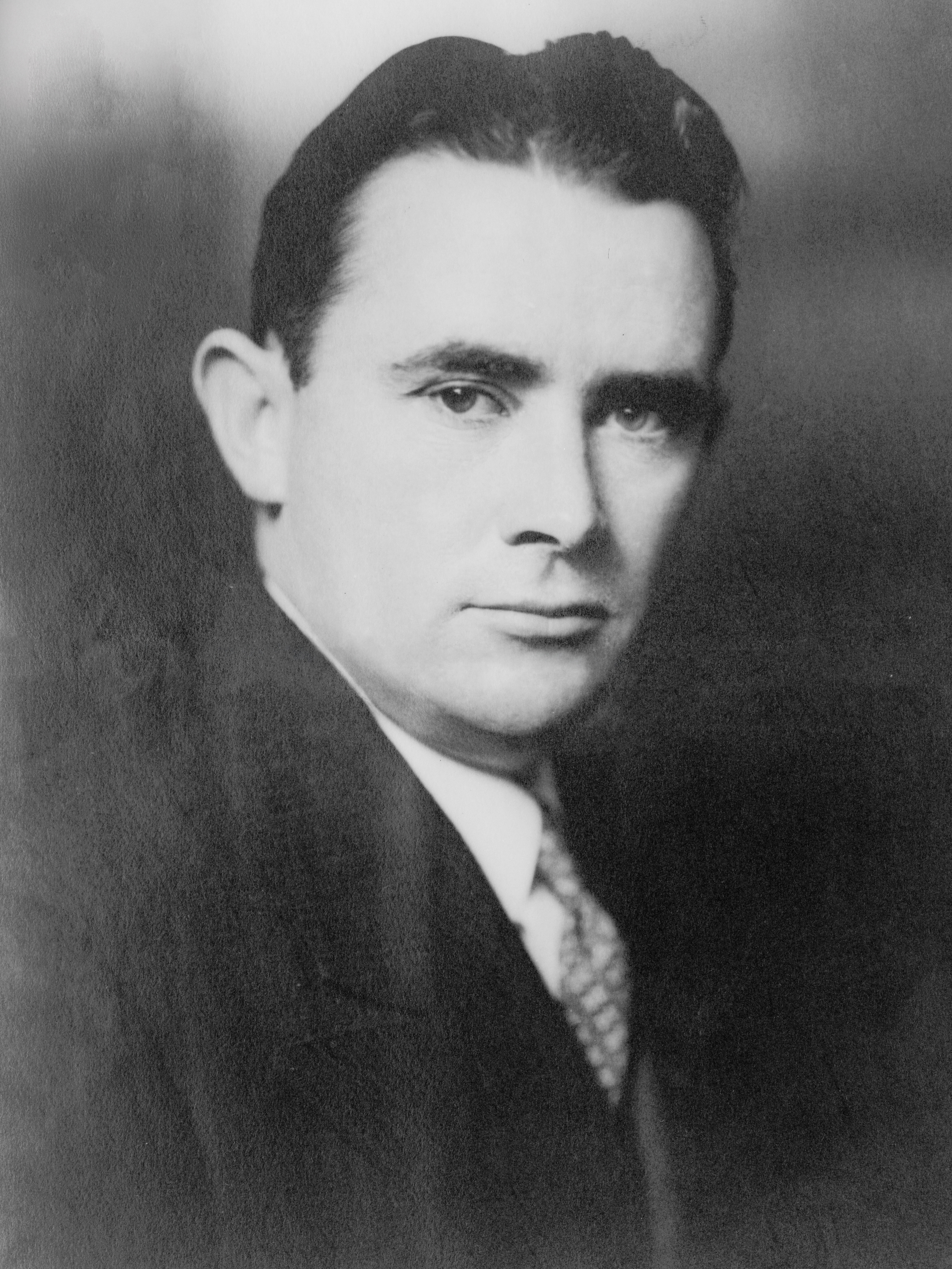
Nominee	George W. Malone	Berkeley L. Bunker
Party	Republican	Democratic
Popular vote	27,801	22,553
Percentage	55.21%	44.79%
- County results Malone: 50–60% 60–70% 70–80% Bunker: 50–60% 60–70%
U.S. senator before election
Edward P. Carville
Democratic
Elected U.S. Senator
George W. Malone
Republican

1946 United States Senate election in Nevada
Party	Candidate	Votes	%
Republican	George W. Malone	27,801	55.21%
Democratic	Berkeley L. Bunker	22,553	44.79%
Majority		5,248	10.42%
Turnout		50,354	
Republican gain from Democratic			

== New Jersey ==
1946 United States Senate election in New Jersey
- November 5, 1946
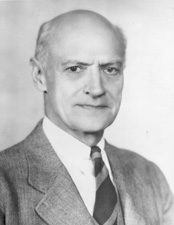

Nominee	H. Alexander Smith	George E. Brunner
Party	Republican	Democratic
Popular vote	799,808	548,458
Percentage	58.50%	40.12%
- County Results; Smith: 50–60% 60–70% 70–80% 80–90% Brunner: 50–60% 60–70%
Senator before election
H. Alexander Smith
Republican
Elected Senator
H. Alexander Smith
Republican

1946 United States Senate election in New Jersey
Party	Candidate	Votes	%
Republican	H. Alexander Smith (incumbent)	799,808	58.50%
Democratic	George E. Brunner	548,458	40.12%
Socialist Labor	John C. Butterworth	7,675	0.56%
Socialist Workers	George Breitman	4,976	0.36%
Socialist	Arthur Riley	2,226	0.16%
Prohibition	George W. Ridout	1,711	0.13%
Anti-Medical Trust Federation	Frederick W. Collins	1,676	0.12%
Independent American	Mark M. Jones	625	0.05%
Majority		251,350	18.38%
Turnout		1,367,155	
Republican hold			

== New Mexico ==
1946 United States Senate election in New Mexico
- November 5, 1946
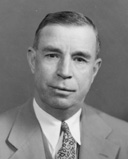

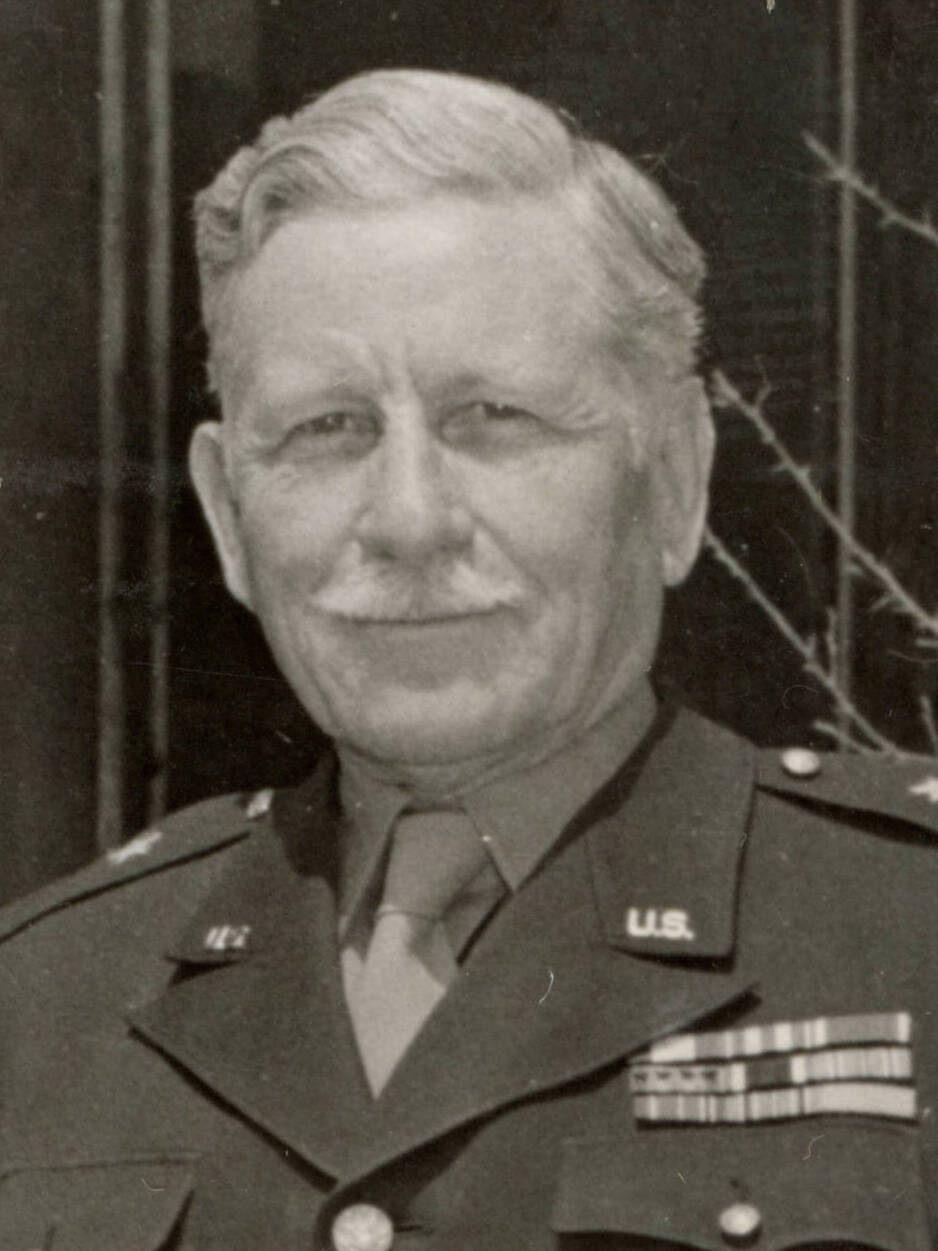
Nominee	Dennis Chavez	Patrick J. Hurley
Party	Democratic	Republican
Popular vote	68,650	64,632
Percentage	51.51%	48.49%
- County results Chevez: 50–60% 60–70% Hurley: 50–60% 60–70%
U.S. senator before election
Dennis Chavez
Democratic
Elected U.S. Senator
Dennis Chavez
Democratic

1946 United States Senate election in New Mexico
Party	Candidate	Votes	%
Democratic	Dennis Chávez (incumbent)	68,650	51.51%
Republican	Patrick J. Hurley	64,632	48.49%
Majority		4,018	3.02%
Turnout		133,282	
Democratic hold			

== New York ==
1946 United States Senate election in New York
- November 5, 1946
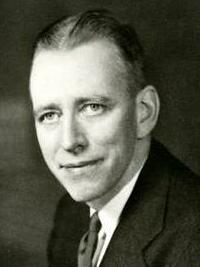

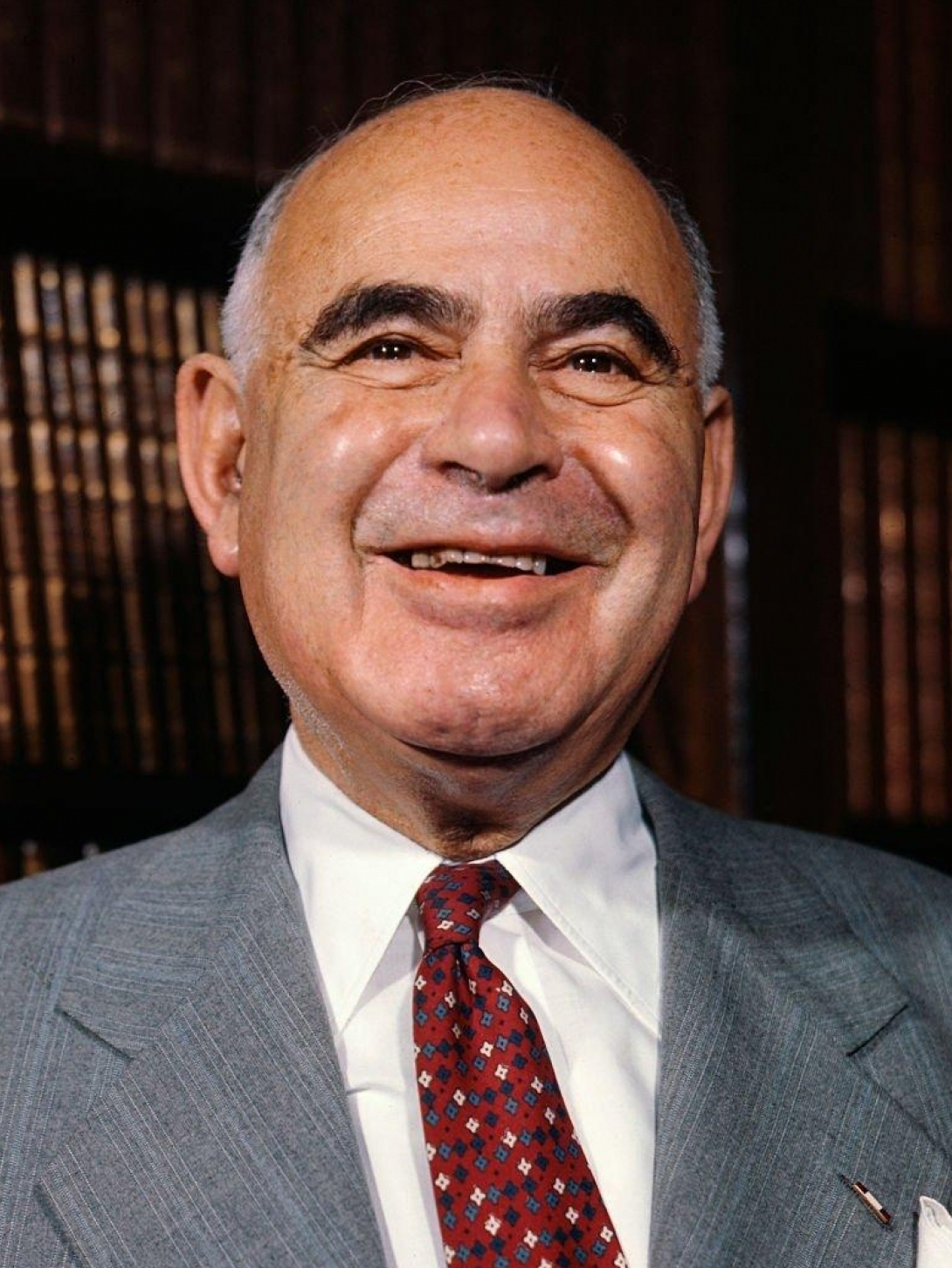
Nominee	Irving Ives	Herbert Lehman
Party	Republican	Democratic
Alliance		Liberal; American Labor
Popular vote	2,559,365	2,308,112
Percentage	52.58%	47.42%
- County results Ives: 50–60% 60–70% 70–80% 80–90% Lehman: 50–60% 60–70%
U.S. senator before election
James M. Mead
Democratic
Elected U.S. Senator
Irving M. Ives
Republican

The New York state election was held on November 5, 1946.

The Socialist Labor state convention met on April 7 and nominated Eric Hass for the U.S.Senate. The party filed a petition to nominate candidates under the name "Industrial Government Party."

The Liberal Party gathered 51,015 signatures and filed a petition to nominate candidates with the Secretary of State on September 2.

The Republican state convention met on September 4 at Saratoga Springs, New York. They nominated Assembly Majority Leader Irving M. Ives.

The Democratic state convention met on September 4 at Albany, New York, and nominated Ex-Governor Herbert H. Lehman (in office 1933–1942) for the U.S. Senate.

The American Labor state convention met on September 3 and endorsed Lehman. Fielding, Chapman and Abt were withdrawn from the ticket on September 5, and Democrats Corning, Young and Epstein substituted on the ticket.

The Socialist Workers Party filed a petition to nominate candidates headed by Farrell Dobbs for Governor.

The Industrial Government, Socialist and Socialist Workers tickets were not allowed on the ballot because of "defective nominating petitions." The Court of Appeals upheld the decisions of the lower courts.

The whole Republican ticket was elected in a landslide.

New York general election
Party	Candidate	Votes	%	±%
Republican	Irving M. Ives	2,559,365	52.58%	▲5.92%
Total	Herbert Lehman	2,308,112	47.42%	▼5.16%
Democratic	Herbert Lehman	1,688,887	34.70%	
American Labor	Herbert Lehman	435,846	8.95%	
Liberal	Herbert Lehman	183,379	3.77%	
Total votes		4,867,477	36.14%	
Republican gain from Democratic				

Obs.:

- "Blank, void and scattering" votes: 178,694

== North Dakota ==
=== North Dakota (regular) ===
1946 United States Senate election in North Dakota
- November 5, 1946
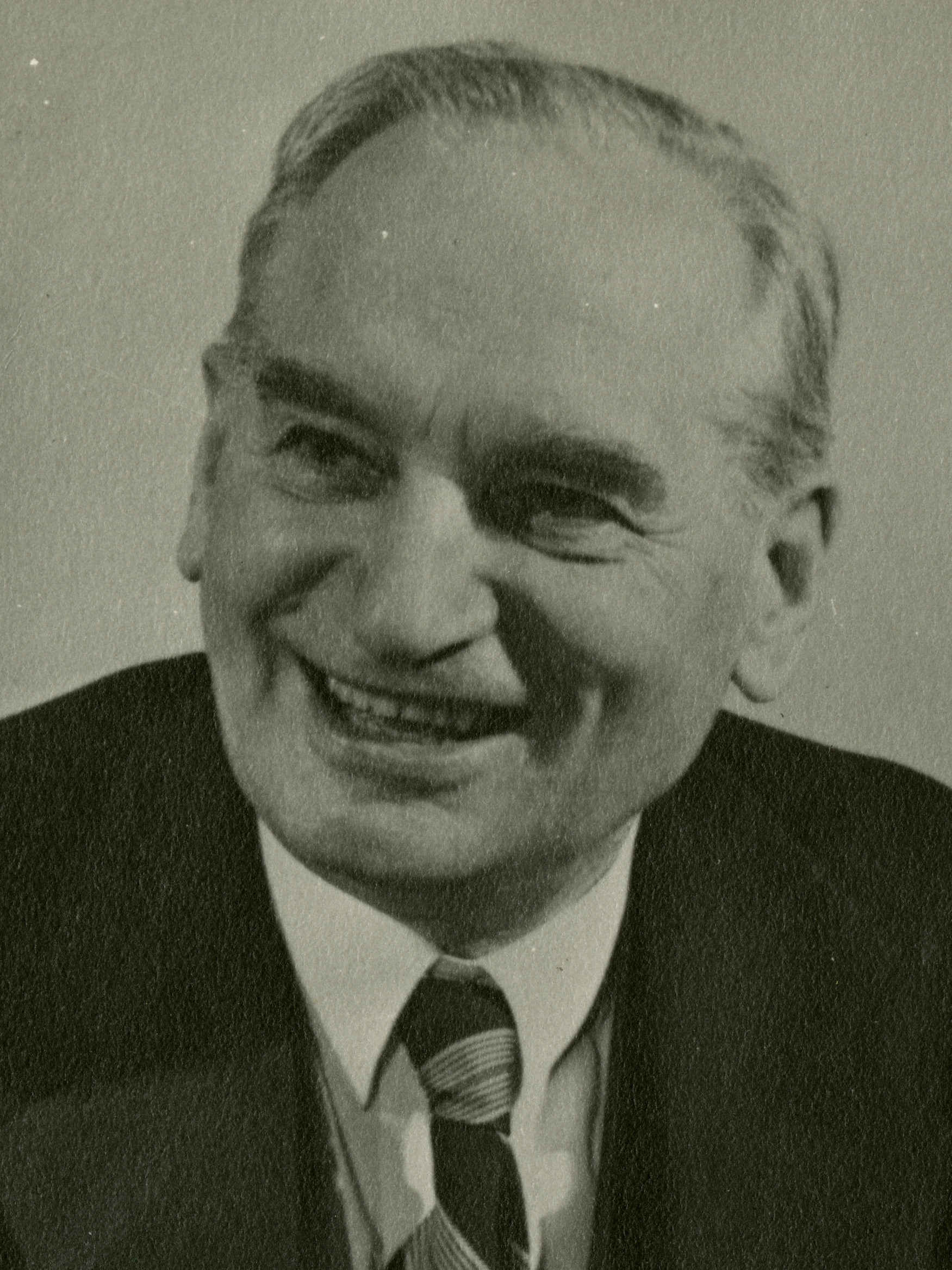

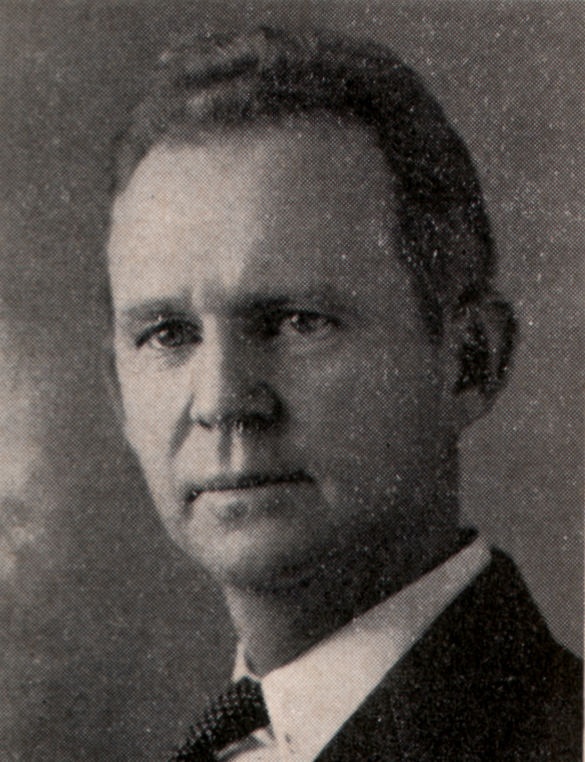

Nominee	William Langer	Arthur E. Thompson	Abner B. Larson
Party	Republican	Independent	Democratic
Popular vote	88,210	38,804	38,368
Percentage	53.34%	23.46%	23.20%
- County results Langer: 30–40% 40–50% 50–60% 60–70% 70–80%
U.S. senator before election
William Langer
Republican
Elected U.S. Senator
William Langer
Republican

First-term Republican William Langer was re-elected to a second term. Langer would be re-elected twice more, serving until his 1959 death.

1946 United States Senate election in North Dakota
Party	Candidate	Votes	%	±%
Republican	William Langer (incumbent)	88,210	53.34%	+15.23%
Independent	Arthur E. Thompson	38,804	23.46%	—
Democratic	Abner B. Larson	38,368	23.20%	−3.25%
Majority		49,406	29.87%	+26.82%
Turnout		165,382		
Republican hold				

=== North Dakota (special) ===
1946 United States Senate special election in North Dakota
- June 25, 1946
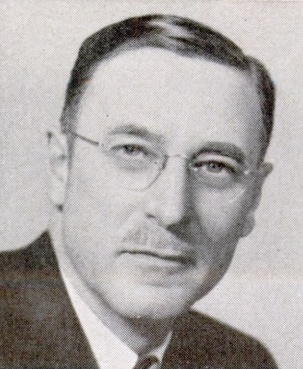

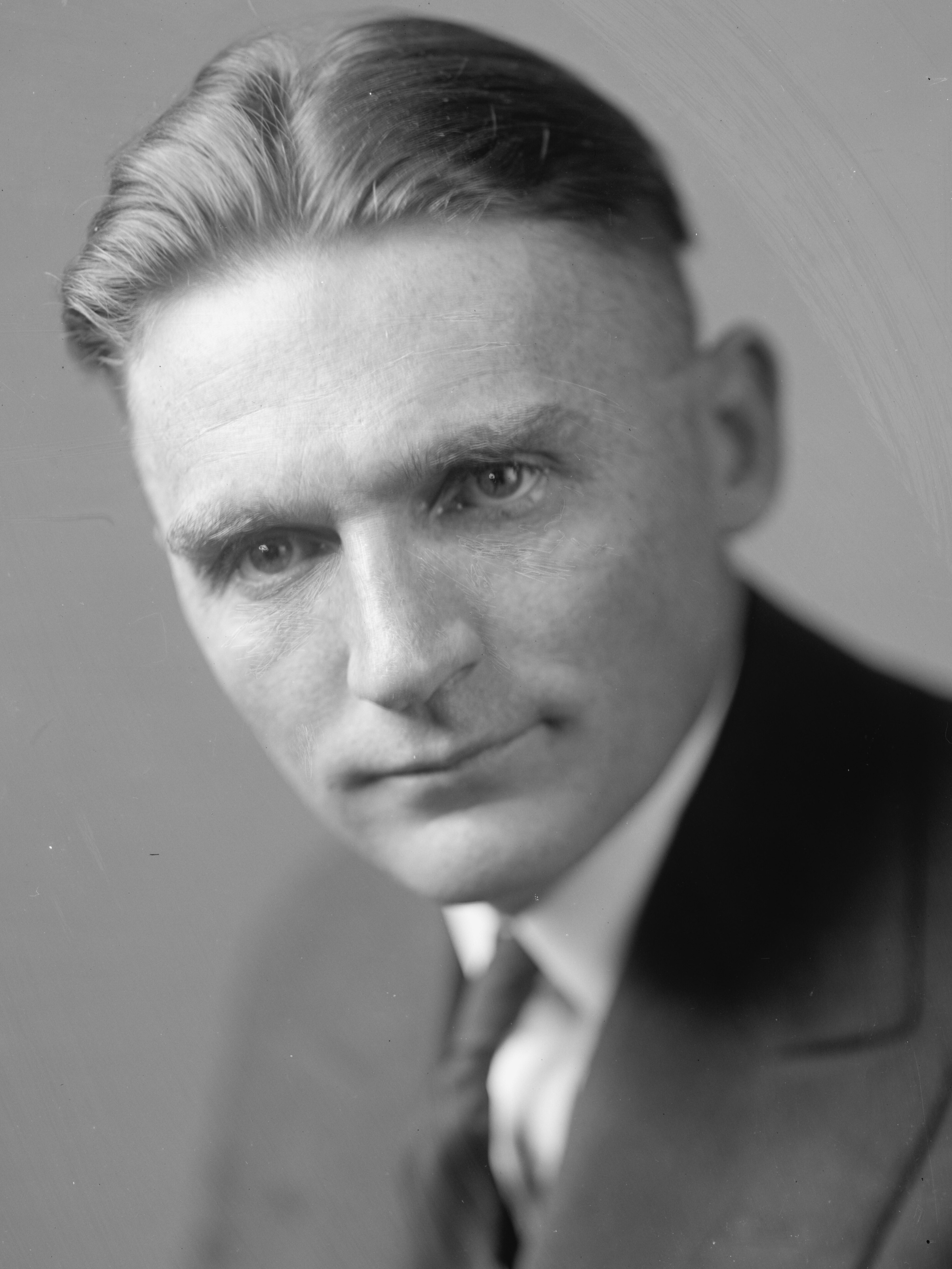
Nominee	Milton Young	P. W. "Bill" Lanier	Gerald Nye
Party	Republican	Democratic	Independent
Popular vote	75,998	37,507	20,848
Percentage	55.54%	27.41%	15.24%
- County results Young: 40–50% 50–60% 60–70% 70–80%
U.S. senator before election
Milton Young
Republican
Elected U.S. Senator
Milton Young
Republican

Newly-elected Democrat John Moses had died March 3, 1945, and Republican state senator Milton Young was appointed March 12, 1945, to continue the term, pending a special election. Young was elected June 25, 1946, to finish the term that would end in 1951. Young would go on to be elected 5 more times, serving until his 1981 retirement.

1946 United States Senate special election in North Dakota
Party	Candidate	Votes	%
Republican	Milton Young (incumbent)	75,998	55.53
Democratic	Bill Lanier	37,507	27.41
Independent	Gerald P. Nye	20,848	15.23
Independent	E.A. Johansson	2,473	1.81
None	Scattering	26	0.02
Majority		38,491	28.13
Turnout		136,852	
Republican hold			

== Ohio ==
There were 2 elections to the same seat due to the September 30, 1945, resignation of Republican Harold H. Burton.

Democrat James W. Huffman was appointed to continue the term, pending a special election in which Huffman was not a candidate. Huffman was, however, nominated to the regular election, which he lost.

=== Ohio (special) ===
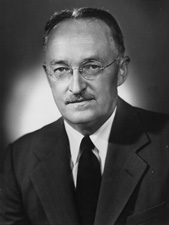
Senator Kingsley A. Taft

Ohio special election
Party	Candidate	Votes	%
Republican	Kingsley A. Taft	1,193,852	56.22%
Democratic	Henry P. Webber	929,584	43.78%
Majority		264,268	12.44%
Turnout		2,123,436	
Republican gain from Democratic			

=== Ohio (regular) ===
1946 United States Senate election in Ohio
- November 5, 1946
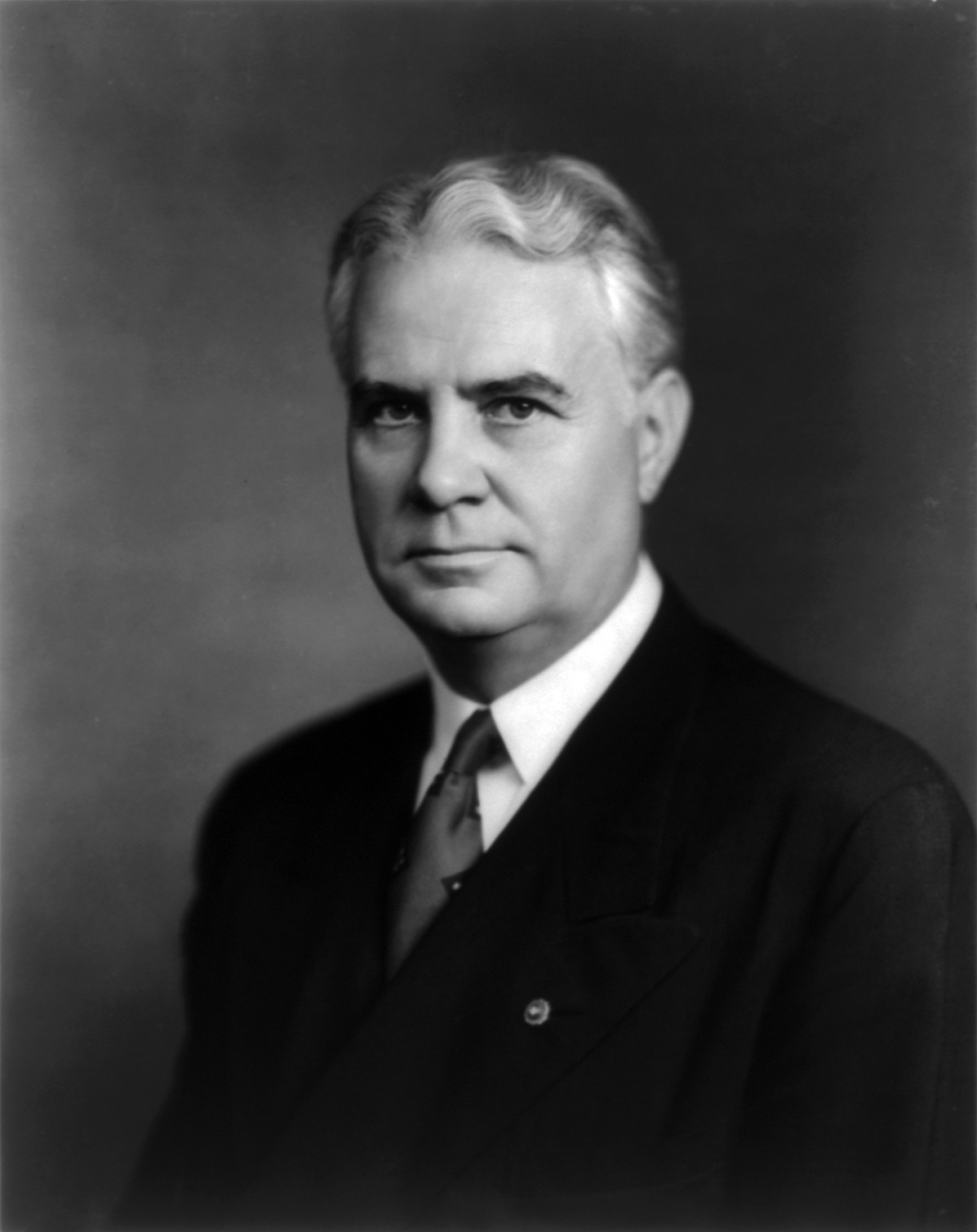

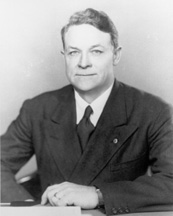
Nominee	John W. Bricker	James W. Huffman
Party	Republican	Democratic
Popular vote	1,275,774	947,610
Percentage	57.02%	42.36%
- County results Bricker: 50–60% 60–70% 70–80% Huffman: 50–60%
U.S. senator before election
James W. Huffman
Democratic
Elected U.S. Senator
John W. Bricker
Republican

Ohio regular election
Party	Candidate	Votes	%
Republican	John W. Bricker	1,275,774	57.02%
Democratic	James W. Huffman (incumbent)	947,610	42.36%
Socialist Labor	William Farkas	13,885	0.62%
Majority		328,164	14.66%
Turnout		2,237,269	
Republican gain from Democratic			

== Pennsylvania ==
1946 United States Senate election in Pennsylvania
- November 5, 1946
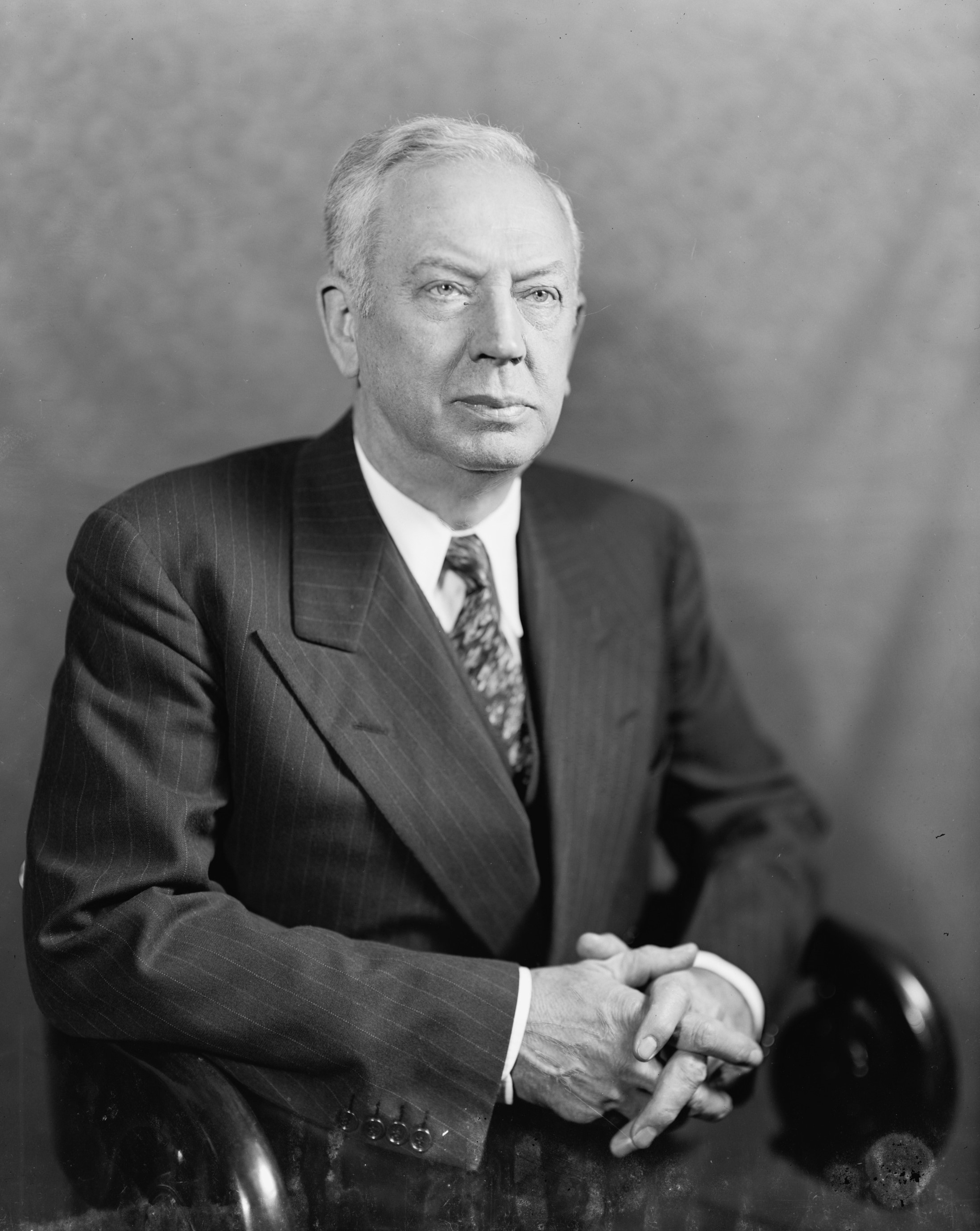

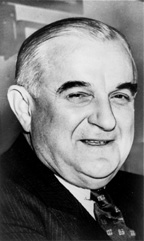
Nominee	Edward Martin	Joseph F. Guffey
Party	Republican	Democratic
Popular vote	1,853,458	1,245,338
Percentage	59.26%	39.81%
- County results Cooke: 40–50% 50–60% 60–70% 70–80% 80–90% Guffey: 40–50% 50–60%
U.S. senator before election
Joseph F. Guffey
Democratic
Elected U.S. Senator
Edward Martin
Republican

Incumbent Democrat Joseph F. Guffey lost re-election to Republican Edward Martin.

General election results
Party	Candidate	Votes	%	±%
Republican	Edward Martin	1,853,458	59.26%	+11.90%
Democratic	Joseph F. Guffey (incumbent)	1,245,338	39.81%	−11.98%
Prohibition	Dale H. Learn	17,451	0.56%	+0.28%
Socialist Labor	Frank Knotek	11,613	0.37%	+0.31%
Majority		608,120	19.45%	
Turnout		3,127,860		
Republican gain from Democratic				

== Rhode Island ==
1946 United States Senate election in Rhode Island
Party	Candidate	Votes	%
Democratic	J. Howard McGrath	150,748	55.11%
Republican	W. Gurnee Dwyer	122,780	44.89%
Majority		27,968	10.22%
Turnout		273,528	
Democratic hold			

== Tennessee ==
1946 United States Senate election in Tennessee
- November 5, 1946
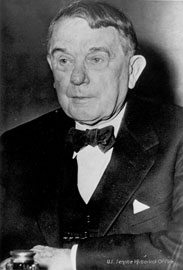

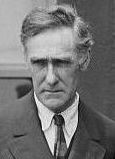
Nominee	Kenneth McKellar	William B. Ladd	John Randolph Neal Jr.
Party	Democratic	Republican	Independent
Popular vote	145,654	57,237	11,516
Percentage	66.60%	26.17%	5.27%
- County results McKellar: 40–50% 50–60% 60–70% 70–80% 80–90% >90% Ladd: 40–50% 50–60% 60–70%
U.S. senator before election
Kenneth McKellar
Democratic
Elected U.S. senator
Kenneth McKellar
Democratic

1946 United States Senate election in Tennessee
Party	Candidate	Votes	%
Democratic	Kenneth McKellar (incumbent)	145,654	66.60%
Republican	William B. Ladd	57,238	26.17%
Independent	John Randolph Neal Jr.	11,516	5.27%
Independent	Herman H. Ross	4,303	1.97%
None	Scattering	3	0.00%
Majority		88,416	40.43%
Turnout		218,714	
Democratic hold			

== Texas ==
1946 United States Senate election in Texas
- November 5, 1946
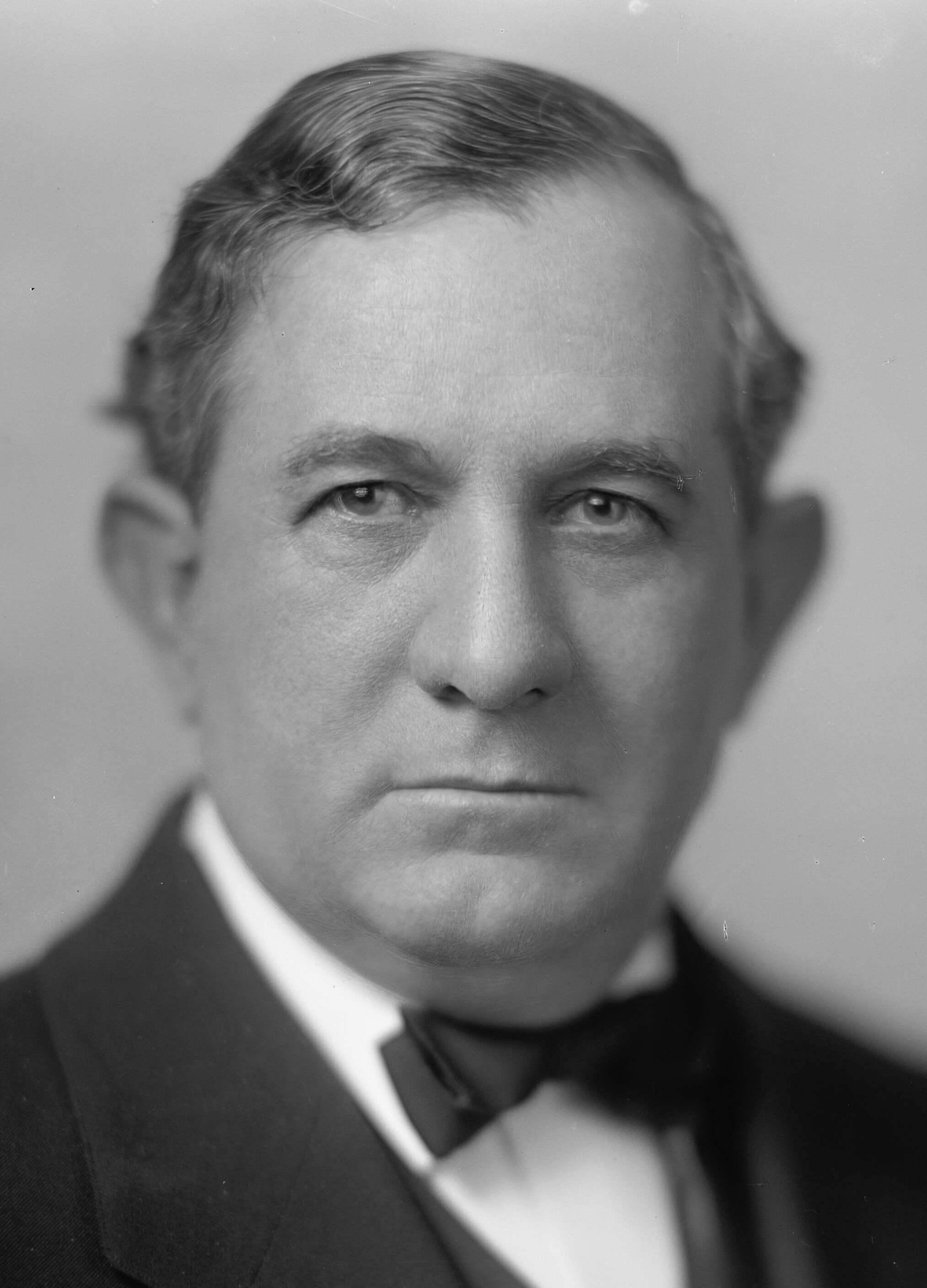

Nominee	Tom Connally	Murray Sells
Party	Democratic	Republican
Popular vote	336,931	43,750
Percentage	88.51%	11.49%
- County Results Connally: 60–70% 70–80% 80–90% >90% Sells: 50–60% No vote
U.S. senator before election
Tom Connally
Democratic
Elected U.S. Senator
Tom Connally
Democratic

1946 United States Senate election in Texas
Party	Candidate	Votes	%
Democratic	Tom Connally (incumbent)	336,931	88.51%
Republican	Murray C. Sells	43,750	11.49%
Majority		293,181	77.02%
Turnout		380,681	
Democratic hold			

== Utah ==
1946 United States Senate election in Utah
- November 5, 1946
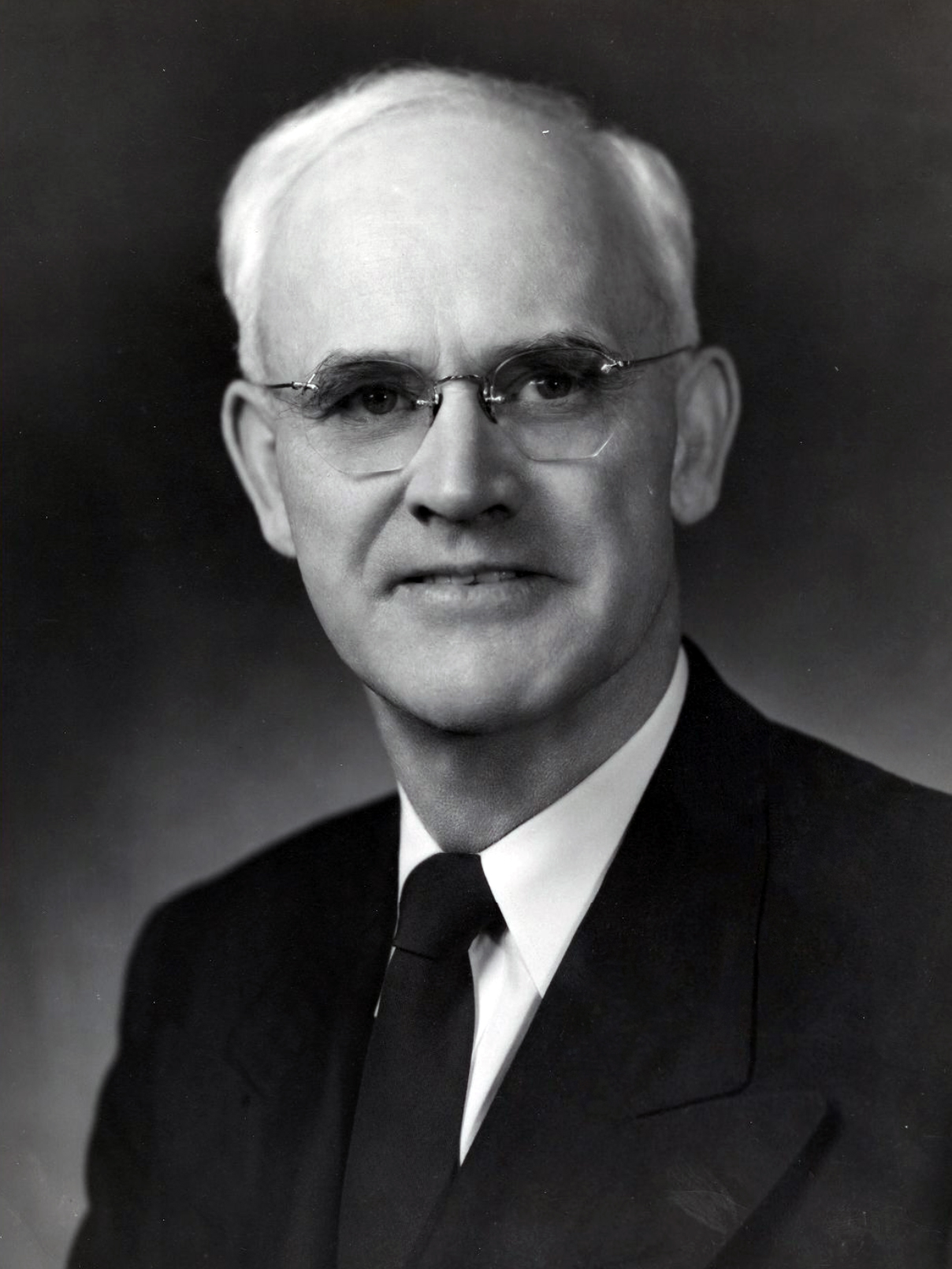

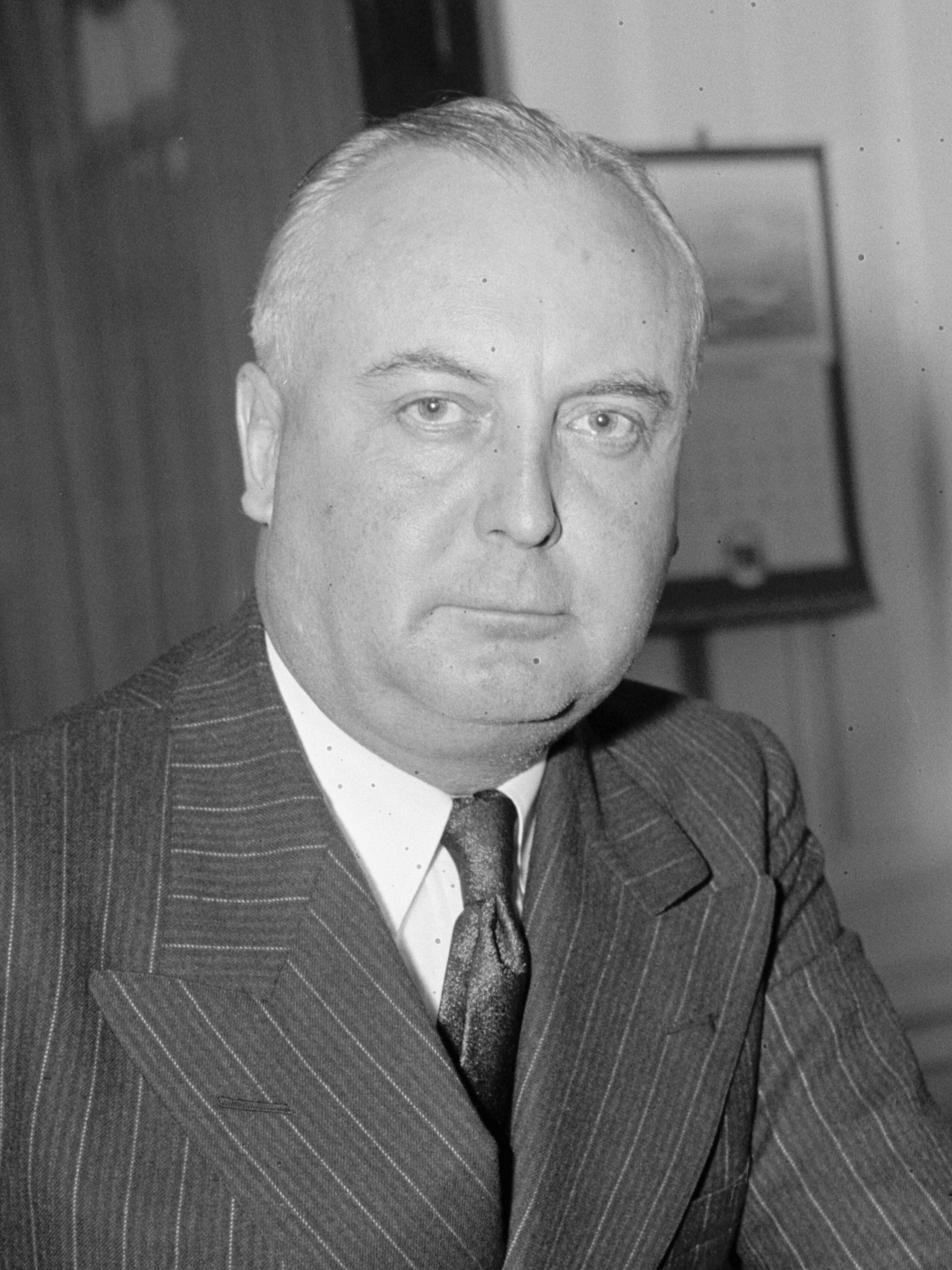
Nominee	Arthur V. Watkins	Abe Murdock
Party	Republican	Democratic
Popular vote	101,142	96,257
Percentage	51.24%	48.76%
- County results Watkins: 50–60% 70–80% Murdock: 50–60% 60–70%
U.S. senator before election
Abe Murdock
Democratic
Elected U.S. Senator
Arthur V. Watkins
Republican

1946 United States Senate election in Utah
Party	Candidate	Votes	%
Republican	Arthur Vivian Watkins	101,142	51.24%
Democratic	Abe Murdock (incumbent)	96,257	48.76%
Majority		4,885	2.48%
Turnout		197,399	
Republican gain from Democratic			

== Vermont ==
1946 United States Senate election in Vermont
- November 5, 1946
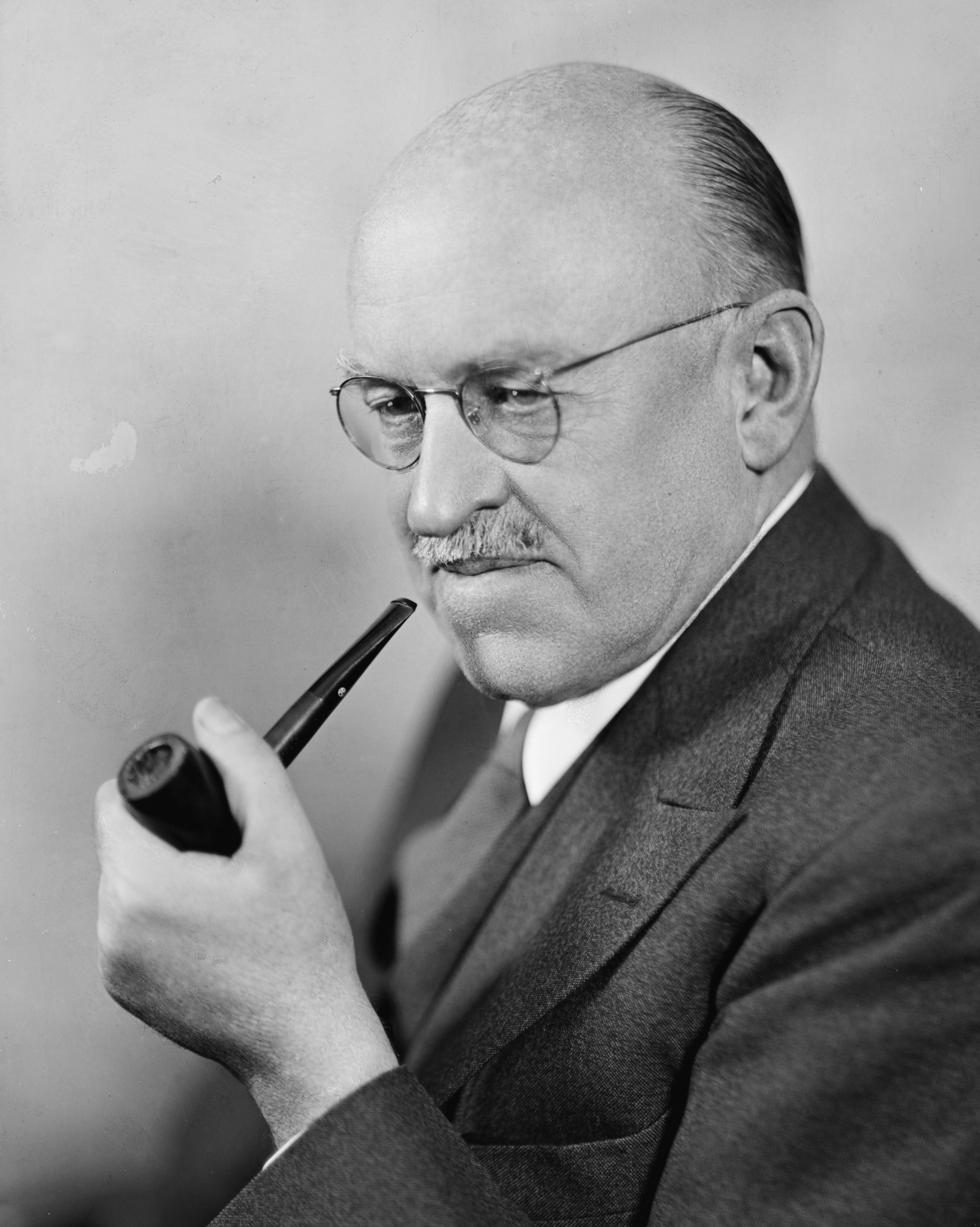

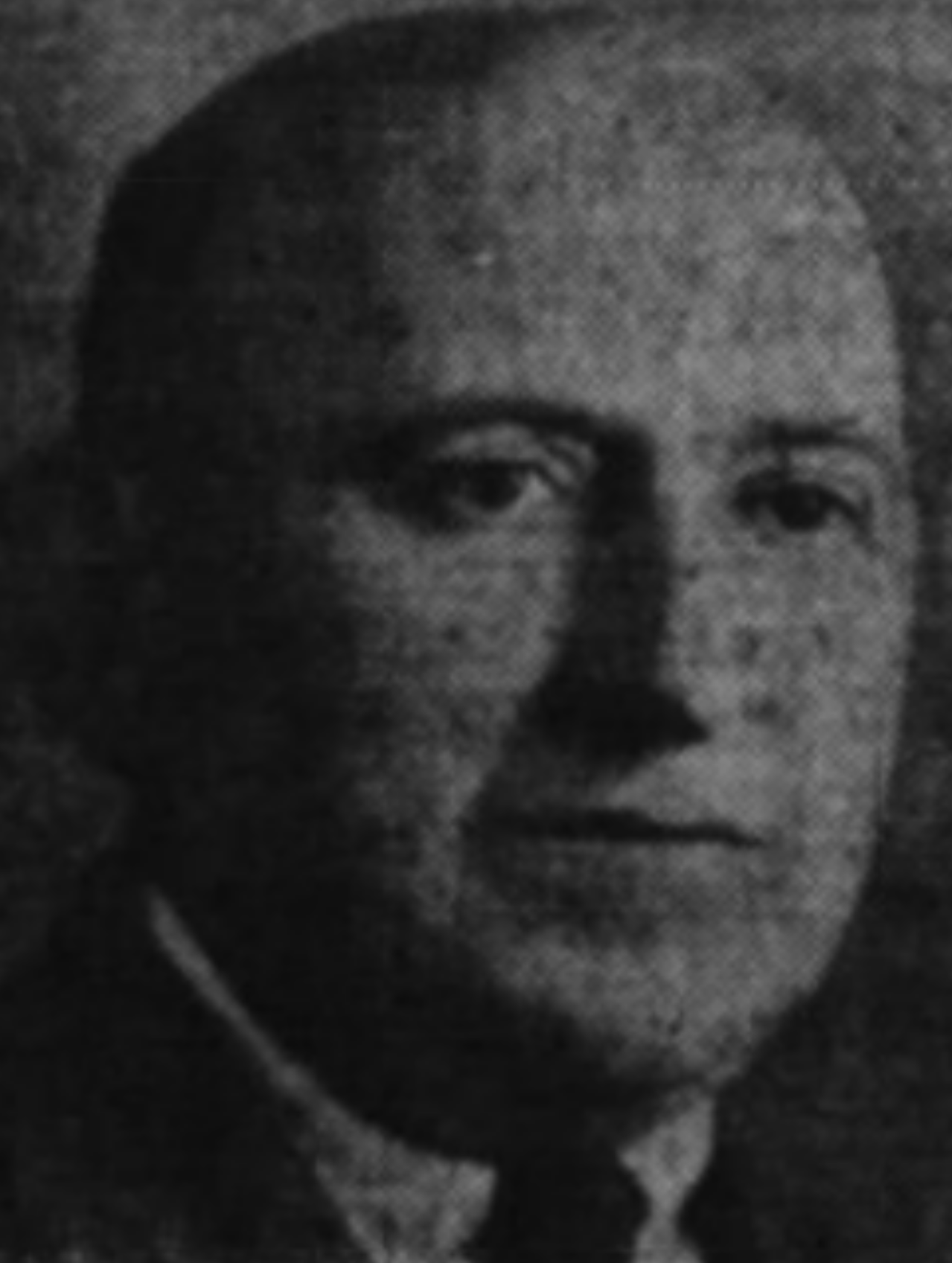
Nominee	Ralph Flanders	Charles McDevitt
Party	Republican	Democratic
Popular vote	54,729	18,594
Percentage	74.64%	25.36%
- Municipality Results; Flanders: 50–60% 60–70% 70–80% 80–90% >90% McDevitt: 50–60% 60–70%
U.S. senator before election
Ralph Flanders
Republican
Elected U.S. Senator
Ralph Flanders
Republican

Incumbent Republican Ralph Flanders successfully ran for re-election to a full term in the United States Senate, defeating Democratic candidate Charles P. McDevitt.

1946 United States Senate election in Vermont
Party	Candidate	Votes	%
Republican	Ralph Flanders (incumbent)	54,729	74.62%
Democratic	Charles P. McDevitt	18,594	25.35%
None	Scattering	17	0.02%
Majority		36,135	49.27%
Total votes		73,340	
Republican hold			

== Virginia ==
=== Virginia (regular) ===
1946 United States Senate election in Virginia
- November 5, 1946
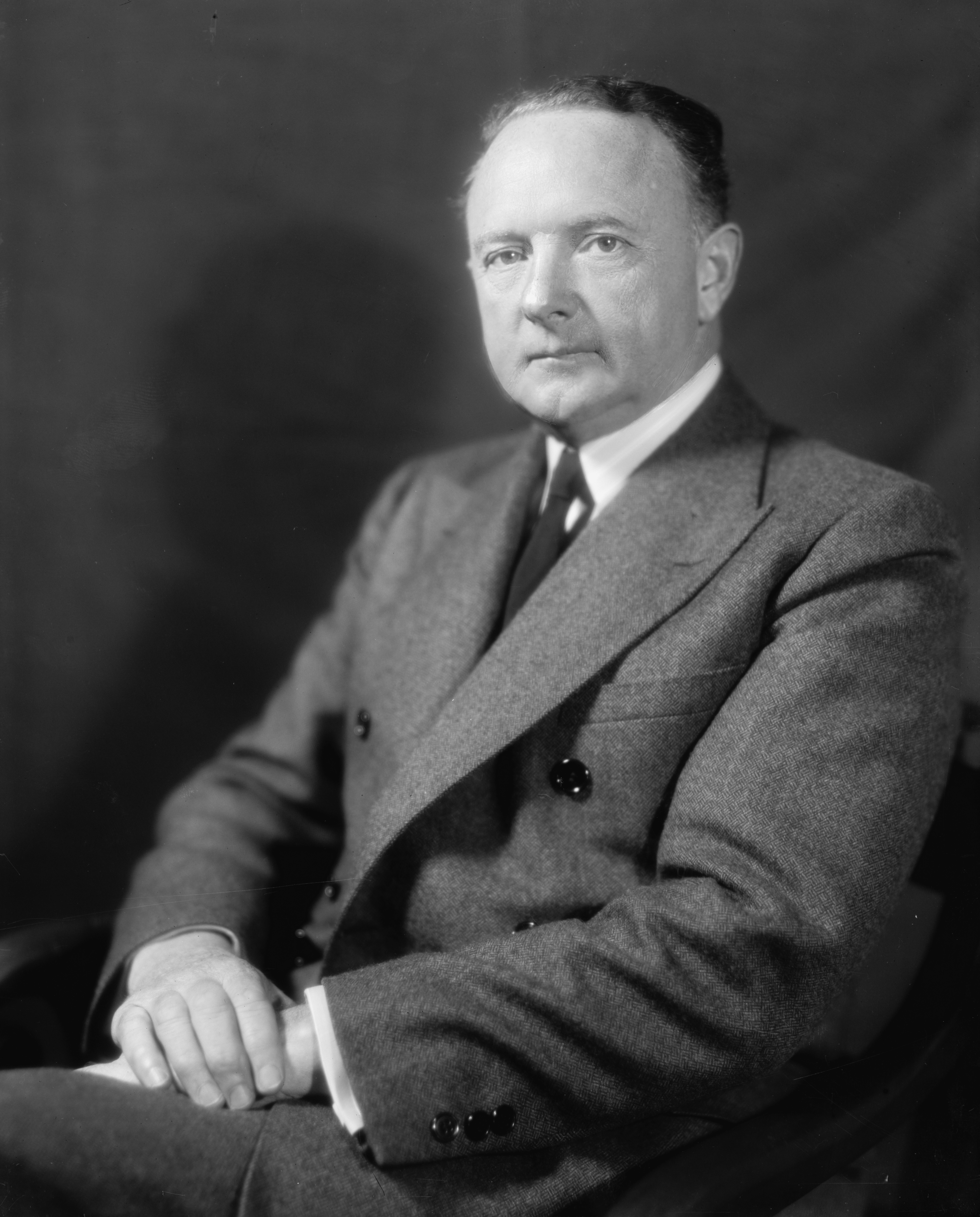
Nominee	Harry F. Byrd Sr.	Lester S. Parsons
Party	Democratic	Republican
Popular vote	163,960	77,005
Percentage	64.8%	30.5%
- County and Independent City Results Byrd: 40–50% 50–60% 60–70% 70–80% 80–90% 90–100% Parsons: 40–50% 50–60%
U.S. senator before election
Harry F. Byrd Sr.
Democratic
Elected U.S. Senator
Harry F. Byrd Sr.
Democratic

Incumbent Harry F. Byrd Sr. was re-elected to a fourth term after defeating Republican Lester S. Parsons.

1946 United States Senate election in Virginia
Party	Candidate	Votes	%	±%
Democratic	Harry F. Byrd Sr. (incumbent)	163,960	64.84%	−28.48%
Republican	Lester S. Parsons	77,005	30.45%	+30.45%
Independent	Howard Carwile	5,189	2.05%	
Communist	Alice Burke	3,318	1.31%	−1.50%
Prohibition	Thomas E. Boorde	1,764	0.70%	+0.70%
Socialist	Clarke T. Robb	1,592	0.63%	+0.63%
Write-ins		35	0.01%	−0.06%
Majority		86,955	34.39%	−55.14%
Turnout		252,863		
Democratic hold				

=== Virginia (special) ===
1946 United States Senate special election in Virginia
- November 5, 1946
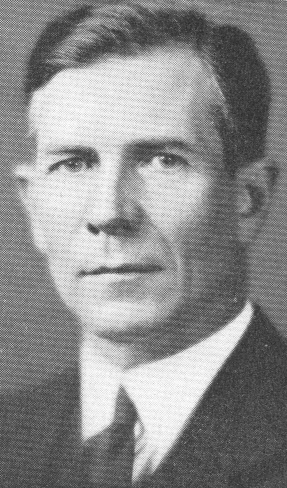

Nominee	Absalom Willis Robertson	Robert H. Woods
Party	Democratic	Republican
Popular vote	169,680	72,253
Percentage	68.15%	29.02%
- County results Robertson: 40–50% 50–60% 60–70% 70–80% 80–90% 90–100% Woods: 40–50% 50–60% 60–70%
U.S. senator before election
Thomas G. Burch
Democratic
Elected U.S. Senator
Absalom Willis Robertson
Democratic

Appointed Democrat Thomas G. Burch retired after filling the vacancy caused by the May 28, 1946, death of Democrat Carter Glass. Democrat Absalom Willis Robertson defeated Republican Robert H. Woods and was elected to finish Glass's term.

1946 United States Senate special election in Virginia
Party	Candidate	Votes	%	±%
Democratic	Absalom Willis Robertson	169,680	68.15%	−22.93%
Republican	Robert H. Woods	72,253	29.02%	+29.02%
Socialist	Lawrence S. Wilkes	7,024	2.82%	−3.71%
Write-ins		5	<0.01%	
Majority		97,427	39.13%	−45.42%
Turnout		248,962		
Democratic hold				

== Washington ==
1946 United States Senate election in Washington
- November 5, 1946
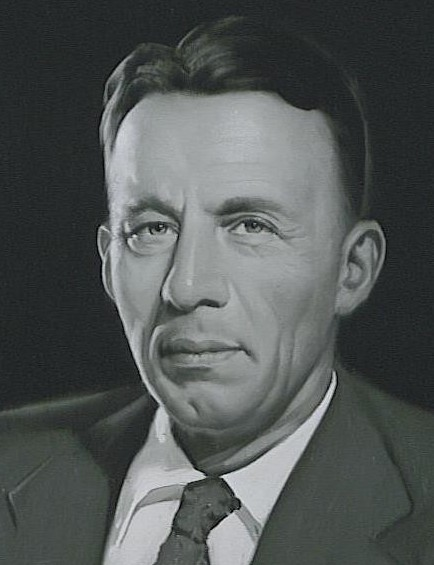

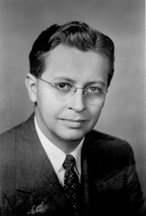
Nominee	Harry Cain	Hugh Mitchell
Party	Republican	Democratic
Popular vote	358,847	298,683
Percentage	54.34%	45.23%
- County results Cain: 40–50% 50–60% 60–70% 70–80% Mitchell: 50–60%
U.S. senator before election
Hugh Mitchell
Democratic
Elected U.S. Senator
Harry Cain
Republican

1946 United States Senate election in Washington
Party	Candidate	Votes	%
Republican	Harry P. Cain	358,847	54.34%
Democratic	Hugh Mitchell (incumbent)	298,683	45.23%
Socialist Labor	Harry Morton	2,297	0.35%
Socialist Workers	Charles R. Swett	515	0.08%
Majority		60,164	9.11%
Turnout		660,342	
Republican gain from Democratic			

== West Virginia ==
1946 United States Senate election in West Virginia
- November 5, 1946
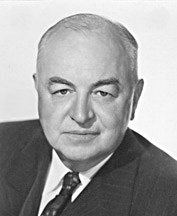
Nominee	Harley M. Kilgore	Thomas Sweeney
Party	Democratic	Republican
Popular vote	273,151	269,617
Percentage	50.33%	49.67%
- County results Kilgore: 50–60% 60–70% Sweeney: 50–60% 60–70% 70–80% 80–90%
U.S. senator before election
Harley M. Kilgore
Democratic
Elected U.S. Senator
Harley M. Kilgore
Democratic

1946 United States Senate election in West Virginia
Party	Candidate	Votes	%
Democratic	Harley M. Kilgore (incumbent)	273,151	50.33%
Republican	Thomas Sweeney	269,617	49.67%
Majority		3,534	0.66%
Turnout		542,768	
Democratic hold			

== Wisconsin ==
1946 United States Senate election in Wisconsin
- November 5, 1946
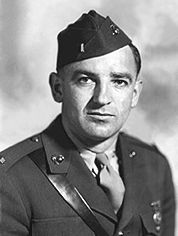

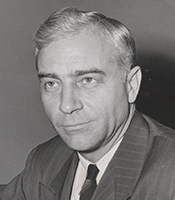
Nominee	Joseph McCarthy	Howard J. McMurray
Party	Republican	Democratic
Popular vote	620,430	378,772
Percentage	61.28%	37.41%
- County results McCarthy: 50–60% 60–70% 70–80% 80–90% McMurray: 50–60%
U.S. senator before election
Robert M. La Follette Jr.
Republican
Elected U.S. Senator
Joseph McCarthy
Republican

Three-term incumbent Republican Robert La Follette Jr. lost renomination to Joseph McCarthy, who then won the general election.

}

Wisconsin Republican primary
Party	Candidate	Votes	%
Republican	Joseph McCarthy	207,935	47.25%
Republican	Robert M. La Follette Jr. (incumbent)	202,557	46.03%
Republican	Perry J. Stearns	29,605	6.73%
Turnout		440,097	

1946 United States Senate election in Wisconsin
Party	Candidate	Votes	%
Republican	Joseph McCarthy	620,430	61.15%
Democratic	Howard J. McMurray	378,772	37.33%
Socialist	Edwin Knappe	11,750	1.16%
Socialist Labor	Georgia Cozzini	1,552	0.15%
None	Scattering	2,090	0.21%
Majority		241,658	23.82%
Turnout		1,014,594	
Republican hold			

== Wyoming ==
1946 United States Senate election in Wyoming
- November 5, 1946
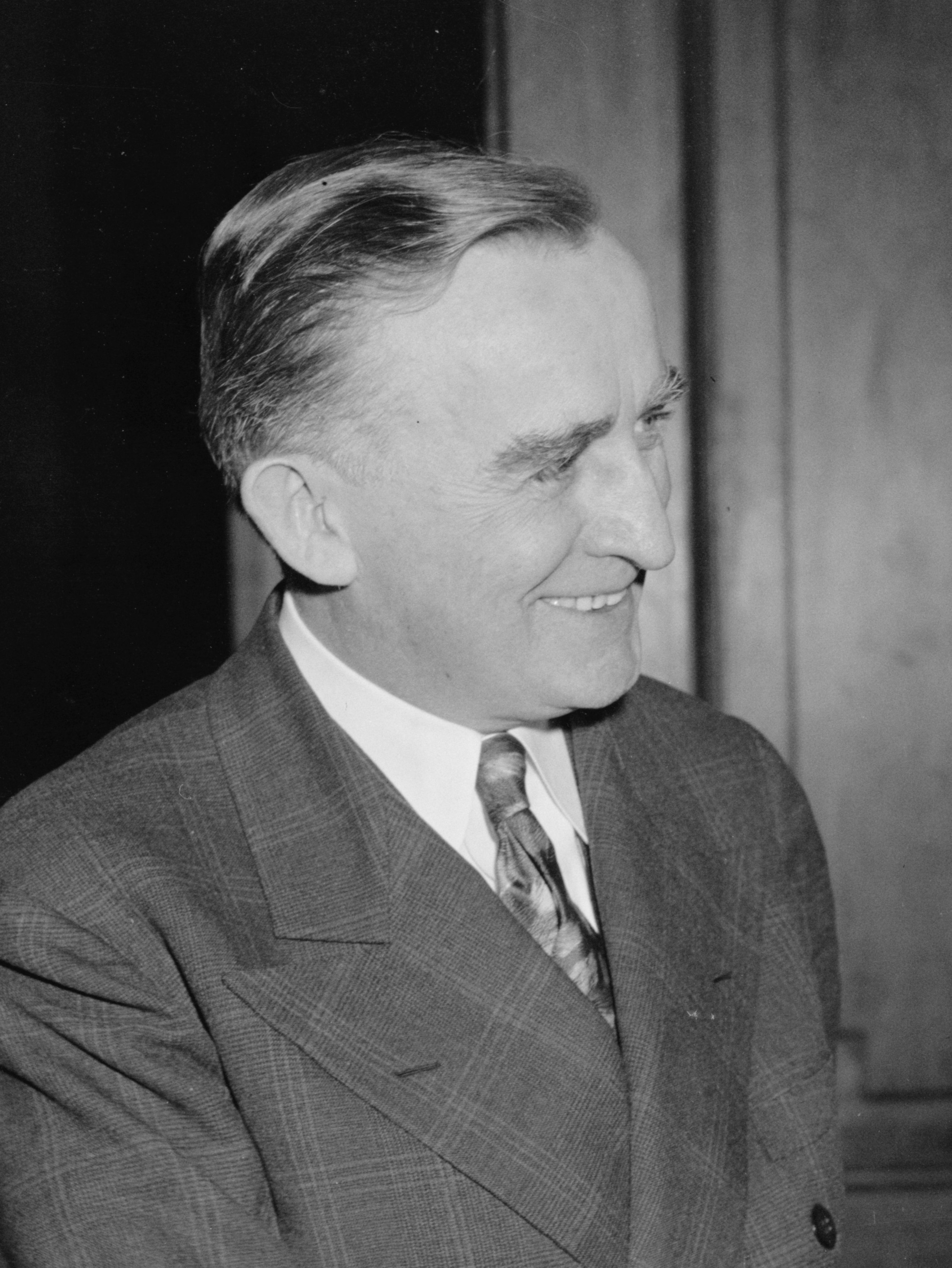
Nominee	Joseph C. O'Mahoney	Harry B. Henderson
Party	Democratic	Republican
Popular vote	45,843	35,714
Percentage	56.21%	43.79%
- County results O'Mahoney: 50–60% 60–70% Henderson: 50–60% 60–70%
U.S. senator before election
Joseph C. O'Mahoney
Democratic
Elected U.S. Senator
Joseph C. O'Mahoney
Democratic

1946 United States Senate election in Wyoming
Party	Candidate	Votes	%
Democratic	Joseph C. O'Mahoney (incumbent)	45,843	56.21%
Republican	Harry B. Henderson	35,714	43.79%
Majority		10,129	12.42%
Turnout		81,557	
Democratic hold			

== See also ==
- 1946 United States elections
  - 1946 United States gubernatorial elections
  - 1946 United States House of Representatives elections
- 79th United States Congress
- 80th United States Congress
