= 1956 United States Senate election in Arkansas =

1956 U.S. Senate election in Arkansas
- November 6, 1956
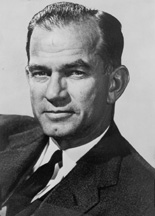

Nominee	J. William Fulbright	Ben C. Henley
Party	Democratic	Republican
Popular vote	331,679	98,013
Percentage	82.98%	17.02%
- County results Fulbright: 50–60% 60–70% 70–80% 80–90% >90% Henley: 50–60%
U.S. senator before election
J. William Fulbright
Democratic
Elected U.S. Senator
J. William Fulbright
Democratic

The 1956 United States Senate election in Arkansas took place on November 2, 1956. Incumbent Senator J. William Fulbright won a third term in office. Without a primary challenger to Fulbright, the election did not attract much attention, as the Democratic nomination was tantamount to victory in the South.

Fulbright defeated Republican Ben Henley in a landslide.

== General election ==
=== Results ===
1956 U.S. Senate election in Arkansas
Party	Candidate	Votes	%
Democratic	J. William Fulbright (inc.)	331,679	82.98%
Republican	Ben C. Henley	68,016	17.02%
Total votes		399,695	100.00%

== See also ==
- 1956 United States Senate elections
