= 1956 United States Senate elections =

- November 6, 1956
- Class 3

35 of the 96 seats in the United States Senate 49 seats needed for a majority
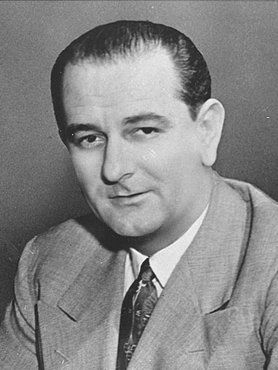

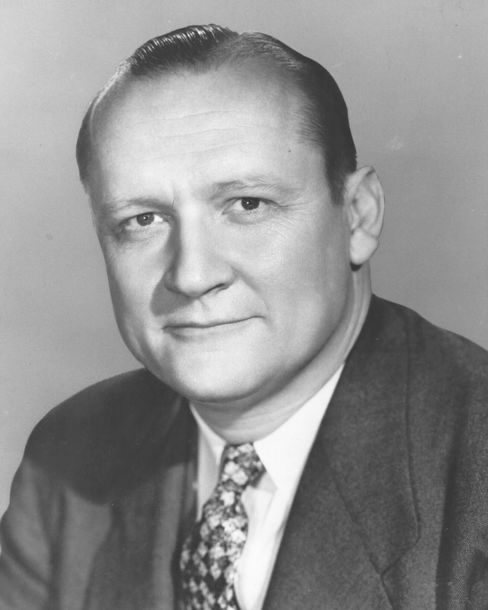
	Majority party	Minority party
Leader	Lyndon Johnson	William Knowland
Party	Democratic	Republican
Leader since	January 3, 1953	August 4, 1953
Leader's seat	Texas	California
Seats before	49	47
Seats after	49	47
Seat change	Steady	Steady
Popular vote	23,291,351 (Note: The Liberal Party in New York endorsed Robert F. Wagner Jr., a Democrat, but the Clerk of the U.S. House of Representatives did not tabulate their votes, totaling 300,648, into the national Democratic total.)	22,219,450
Percentage	50.7%	48.4%
Seats up	18	17
Races won	18	17
- Results of the elections: Democratic gain Democratic hold Republican gain Republican hold No election Rectangular inset (Ky. & S. C.): both seats up for election
Majority Leader before election
Lyndon Johnson
Democratic
Elected Majority Leader
Lyndon Johnson
Democratic

The 1956 United States Senate elections were elections for the United States Senate that coincided with the re-election of President Dwight D. Eisenhower. The 32 seats of Class 3 were contested in regular elections, and three special elections were held to fill vacancies. Although Democrats gained two seats in regular elections, the Republicans gained two seats in special elections, leaving the party balance of the chamber unchanged.

Democrats defeated incumbents Herman Welker (R-Idaho), George H. Bender (R-Ohio), and James H. Duff (R-Pennsylvania), as well as winning a Republican-held seat in Colorado. Republicans defeated incumbent Earle C. Clements (D-Kentucky) as well as winning Democratic-held seats in Kentucky, New York, and West Virginia. Thus, this election caused Kentucky's Senate delegation to flip from two Democrats to two Republicans.

During the next Congress, Republican John D. Hoblitzell Jr. was appointed to the seat of deceased Senator Matthew M. Neely (D-WV), while Democrat William Proxmire won a special election for the seat of deceased Senator Joseph McCarthy (R-Wisconsin). Also, Democrat Ralph Yarborough won a special election for the seat of Price Daniel (D-Texas), who had resigned from the Senate after being elected governor of Texas. The net result was to leave the party balance unchanged. Republicans would not win a Senate election in West Virginia again until 2014.

== Results summary ==
↓
49	47
Democratic	Republican

Colored shading indicates party with largest share of that row.

Parties				Total
Parties	Democratic	Republican	Other	Total
Before these elections	49	47	0	96
Not up	31	30	—	61
Class 1 (1952)	11	20	—	31
Class 2 (1954)	20	10	—	30
Up	18	17	—	35
Class 3 (1950→1956)	15	17	—	32
Special: Class 1	1	0	—	1
Special: Class 2	2	0	—	2
Incumbent retired	5	1	—	6
Held by same party	2	0	—	2
Replaced by other party	▼1 Republican replaced by ▲1 Democrat ▼3 Democrats replaced by ▲3 Republicans		—	4
Result	3	3	0	6
Incumbent ran	13	16	—	29
Won re-election	12	13	—	25
Lost re-election	▼3 Republicans replaced by ▲3 Democrats ▼1 Democrat replaced by ▲1 Republican		—	4
Lost renomination but held by same party	0	0	—	0
Result	15	14	0	29
Total elected	18	17	0	35
Net change	Steady	Steady	Steady	0
Nationwide vote	23,291,351	22,219,450	406,207	45,917,008
Share	50.72%	48.39%	0.88%	100%
Result	49	47	0	96

Source: Clerk of the U.S. House of Representatives

== Gains, losses, and holds ==
=== Retirements ===
One Republican and five Democrats retired instead of seeking re-election.

State	Senator	Replaced by
Colorado	Eugene Millikin	John A. Carroll
Georgia	Walter F. George	Herman Talmadge
Kentucky (special)	Robert Humphreys	John Sherman Cooper
New York	Herbert H. Lehman	Jacob Javits
South Carolina (special)	Thomas A. Wofford	Strom Thurmond
West Virginia	William Laird III	Chapman Revercomb

=== Defeats ===
Three Republicans and one Democrat sought re-election but lost in the general election.

State	Senator	Replaced by
Idaho	Herman Welker	Frank Church
Kentucky	Earle Clements	Thruston Ballard Morton
Ohio	George H. Bender	Frank Lausche
Pennsylvania	James H. Duff	Joseph S. Clark Jr.

=== Post-election changes ===
One Republican was appointed to the seat of a deceased Democrat. Two Democrats won special elections; one seat was previously held by a Democrat and another by a Republican. One Democrat was appointed to replace another Democrat.

State	Senator	Replaced by
North Carolina	W. Kerr Scott	B. Everett Jordan
Texas	Price Daniel	Ralph Yarborough
West Virginia	Matthew M. Neely	John D. Hoblitzell Jr.
Wisconsin	Joseph McCarthy	William Proxmire

== Change in composition ==
=== Before the elections ===
		D_{1}	D_{2}	D_{3}	D_{4}	D_{5}	D_{6}	D_{7}	D_{8}
D_{18}	D_{17}	D_{16}	D_{15}	D_{14}	D_{13}	D_{12}	D_{11}	D_{10}	D_{9}
D_{19}	D_{20}	D_{21}	D_{22}	D_{23}	D_{24}	D_{25}	D_{26}	D_{27}	D_{28}
D_{38} Ky. (sp); Ran	D_{37} Ky. (reg); Ran	D_{36} Ga. Retired	D_{35} Florida; Ran	D_{34} Ark. Ran	D_{33} Ariz. Ran	D_{32} Ala. Ran	D_{31}	D_{30}	D_{29}
D_{39} La. Ran	D_{40} Mo. Ran	D_{41} Nev. Ran	D_{42} N.Y. Retired	D_{43} N.C. Ran	D_{44} Okla. Ran	D_{45} Ore. Ran	D_{46} S.C. (reg); Ran	D_{47} S.C. (sp); Retired	D_{48} Washington; Ran
Majority →									D_{49} W.Virginia (sp); Retired
R_{39} Maryland; Ran	R_{40} N.H. Ran	R_{41} N.D. Ran	R_{42} Ohio; Ran	R_{43} Pa. Ran	R_{44} S.D. Ran	R_{45} Utah; Ran	R_{46} Vt. Ran	R_{47} Wisc. Ran	D_{49} W.Virginia (sp); Retired
R_{38} Kan. Ran	R_{37} Iowa; Ran	R_{36} Ind. Ran	R_{35} Ill. Ran	R_{34} Idaho; Ran	R_{33} Conn. Ran	R_{32} Colo. Retired	R_{31} California; Ran	R_{30}	R_{29}
R_{19}	R_{20}	R_{21}	R_{22}	R_{23}	R_{24}	R_{25}	R_{26}	R_{27}	R_{28}
R_{18}	R_{17}	R_{16}	R_{15}	R_{14}	R_{13}	R_{12}	R_{11}	R_{10}	R_{9}
		R_{1}	R_{2}	R_{3}	R_{4}	R_{5}	R_{6}	R_{7}	R_{8}

=== Elections results ===
		D_{1}	D_{2}	D_{3}	D_{4}	D_{5}	D_{6}	D_{7}	D_{8}
D_{18}	D_{17}	D_{16}	D_{15}	D_{14}	D_{13}	D_{12}	D_{11}	D_{10}	D_{9}
D_{19}	D_{20}	D_{21}	D_{22}	D_{23}	D_{24}	D_{25}	D_{26}	D_{27}	D_{28}
D_{38} Mo. Re-elected	D_{37} La. Re-elected	D_{36} Ga. Hold	D_{35} Florida; Re-elected	D_{34} Ark. Re-elected	D_{33} Ariz. Re-elected	D_{32} Ala. Re-elected	D_{31}	D_{30}	D_{29}
D_{39} Nev. Re-elected	D_{40} N.C. Re-elected	D_{41} Okla. Re-elected	D_{42} Ore. Re-elected	D_{43} S.C. (reg); Re-elected	D_{44} S.C. (sp); Hold	D_{45} Washington; Re-elected	D_{46} Colo. Gain	D_{47} Idaho; Gain	D_{48} Ohio; Gain
Majority →									D_{49} Pa. Gain
R_{39} N.D. Re-elected	R_{40} S.D. Re-elected	R_{41} Utah; Re-elected	R_{42} Vt. Re-elected	R_{43} Wisc. Re-elected	R_{44} Ky. (reg); Gain	R_{45} Ky. (sp); Gain	R_{46} N.Y. Gain	R_{47} W.Virginia (sp); Gain	D_{49} Pa. Gain
R_{38} N.H. Re-elected	R_{37} Maryland; Re-elected	R_{36} Kan. Re-elected	R_{35} Iowa; Re-elected	R_{34} Ind. Re-elected	R_{33} Ill. Re-elected	R_{32} Conn. Re-elected	R_{31} California; Re-elected	R_{30}	R_{29}
R_{19}	R_{20}	R_{21}	R_{22}	R_{23}	R_{24}	R_{25}	R_{26}	R_{27}	R_{28}
R_{18}	R_{17}	R_{16}	R_{15}	R_{14}	R_{13}	R_{12}	R_{11}	R_{10}	R_{9}
		R_{1}	R_{2}	R_{3}	R_{4}	R_{5}	R_{6}	R_{7}	R_{8}

Key	D_{#} / Democratic; R_{#} / Republican

== Race summaries ==
=== Special elections during the 84th Congress ===
In these special elections, the winners were seated during 1956 or in 1957 before January 3; ordered by election date, then state.

State	Incumbent			Results	Candidates
State	Senator	Party	Electoral history	Results	Candidates
Kentucky (Class 2)	Robert Humphreys	Democratic	1956 (appointed)	Interim appointee retired. New senator elected November 6, 1956. Republican gain.	▌ ✓ John Sherman Cooper (Republican) 53.2%; ▌Lawrence Wetherby (Democratic) 46.8%
South Carolina (Class 2)	Thomas A. Wofford	Democratic	1956 (appointed)	Interim appointee retired. New senator elected November 6, 1956. Democratic hold.	▌ ✓ Strom Thurmond (Democratic); Unopposed
West Virginia (Class 1)	William Laird III	Democratic	1956 (appointed)	Interim appointee retired. New senator elected November 6, 1956. Republican gain.	▌ ✓ Chapman Revercomb (Republican) 53.7%; ▌William C. Marland (Democratic) 46.3%

=== Races leading to the 85th Congress ===
In these regular elections, the winners were elected for the term beginning January 3, 1957; ordered by state.

All of the elections involved the Class 3 seats.

State	Incumbent			Results	Candidates
State	Senator	Party	Electoral history	Results	Candidates
Alabama	J. Lister Hill	Democratic	1938 (appointed); 1938; 1944; 1950	Incumbent re-elected.	▌ ✓ J. Lister Hill (Democratic); Unopposed
Arizona	Carl Hayden	Democratic	1926; 1932; 1938; 1944; 1950	Incumbent re-elected.	▌ ✓ Carl Hayden (Democratic) 61.4%; ▌Ross F. Jones (Republican) 38.6%
Arkansas	J. William Fulbright	Democratic	1944; 1950	Incumbent re-elected.	▌ ✓ J. William Fulbright (Democratic) 83.0%; ▌Ben C. Henley (Republican) 17.0%
California	Thomas Kuchel	Republican	1953 (appointed); 1954 (special)	Incumbent re-elected.	▌ ✓ Thomas Kuchel (Republican) 54.0%; ▌Richard Richards (Democratic) 45.6%; ▌Ray Gourley (Prohibition) 0.4%
Colorado	Eugene Millikin	Republican	1941 (appointed); 1942 (special); 1944; 1950	Incumbent retired. New senator elected. Democratic gain.	▌ ✓ John A. Carroll (Democratic) 50.2%; ▌Daniel I. J. Thornton (Republican) 49.8%
Connecticut	Prescott Bush	Republican	1952 (special)	Incumbent re-elected.	▌ ✓ Prescott Bush (Republican) 54.8%; ▌Thomas J. Dodd (Democratic) 43.1%
Florida	George Smathers	Democratic	1950	Incumbent re-elected.	▌ ✓ George Smathers (Democratic); Unopposed
Georgia	Walter F. George	Democratic	1922 (special); 1926; 1932; 1938; 1944; 1950	Incumbent retired. New senator elected. Democratic hold.	▌ ✓ Herman Talmadge (Democratic); Unopposed
Idaho	Herman Welker	Republican	1950	Incumbent lost re-election. New senator elected. Democratic gain.	▌ ✓ Frank Church (Democratic) 56.2%; ▌Herman Welker (Republican) 38.7%
Illinois	Everett Dirksen	Republican	1950	Incumbent re-elected.	▌ ✓ Everett Dirksen (Republican) 54.1%; ▌Richard Stengel (Note: W. (William) Richard Stengel was an Illinois lawyer, state legislator and (after his loss to Dirksen) Rock Island County State's attorney and an Illinois judge. He died in 1994.) (Democratic) 45.7%
Indiana	Homer E. Capehart	Republican	1944; 1950	Incumbent re-elected.	▌ ✓ Homer E. Capehart (Republican) 55.2%; ▌Claude R. Wickard (Democratic) 44.4%
Iowa	Bourke B. Hickenlooper	Republican	1944; 1950	Incumbent re-elected.	▌ ✓ Bourke B. Hickenlooper (Republican) 53.9%; ▌R. M. Evans (Democratic) 46.1%
Kansas	Frank Carlson	Republican	1950 (special); 1950	Incumbent re-elected.	▌ ✓ Frank Carlson (Republican) 57.9%; ▌George Hart (Democratic) 40.5%
Kentucky	Earle Clements	Democratic	1950 (special); 1950	Incumbent lost re-election. New senator elected. Republican gain.	▌ ✓ Thruston Ballard Morton (Republican) 50.4%; ▌Earle Clements (Democratic) 49.6%
Louisiana	Russell B. Long	Democratic	1948 (special); 1950	Incumbent re-elected.	▌ ✓ Russell B. Long (Democratic); Unopposed
Maryland	John Marshall Butler	Republican	1950	Incumbent re-elected.	▌ ✓ John Marshall Butler (Republican) 53.0%; ▌George P. Mahoney (Democratic) 47.0%
Missouri	Thomas C. Hennings Jr.	Democratic	1950	Incumbent re-elected.	▌ ✓ Thomas C. Hennings Jr. (Democratic) 56.4%; ▌Herbert Douglas (Republican) 43.6%
Nevada	Alan Bible	Democratic	1954 (special)	Incumbent re-elected.	▌ ✓ Alan Bible (Democratic) 52.6%; ▌Clarence Clifton Young (Republican) 47.4%
New Hampshire	Norris Cotton	Republican	1954 (special)	Incumbent re-elected.	▌ ✓ Norris Cotton (Republican) 64.1%; ▌Laurence M. Pickett (Democratic) 35.9%
New York	Herbert H. Lehman	Democratic	1949 (special); 1950	Incumbent retired. New senator elected. Republican gain. Winner delayed term until January 9, 1957, when he resigned his post as an attorney general of New York.	▌ ✓ Jacob Javits (Republican) 53.3%; ▌Robert F. Wagner Jr. (Democratic) 46.7%
North Carolina	Sam Ervin	Democratic	1954 (appointed); 1954 (special)	Incumbent re-elected.	▌ ✓ Sam Ervin (Democratic) 66.6%; ▌Joel A. Johnson (Republican) 33.4%
North Dakota	Milton Young	Republican	1945 (appointed); 1946 (special); 1950	Incumbent re-elected.	▌ ✓ Milton Young (Republican) 63.6%; ▌Quentin Burdick (Democratic-NPL) 36.0%
Ohio	George H. Bender	Republican	1954 (special)	Incumbent lost re-election. New senator elected. Democratic gain.	▌ ✓ Frank Lausche (Democratic) 52.9%; ▌George H. Bender (Republican) 47.1%
Oklahoma	Mike Monroney	Democratic	1950	Incumbent re-elected.	▌ ✓ Mike Monroney (Democratic) 55.4%; ▌Douglas McKeever (Republican) 44.7%
Oregon	Wayne Morse	Democratic	1944 (Note: Morse was first elected in 1944 and re-elected in 1950 as a Republican. He became an independent in 1952 and joined the Democratic Party in 1955.); 1950	Incumbent re-elected.	▌ ✓ Wayne Morse (Democratic) 54.2%; ▌Douglas McKay (Republican) 45.8%
Pennsylvania	James H. Duff	Republican	1950	Incumbent lost re-election. New senator elected. Democratic gain.	▌ ✓ Joseph S. Clark Jr. (Democratic) 50.1%; ▌James H. Duff (Republican) 49.7%
South Carolina	Olin D. Johnston	Democratic	1944; 1950	Incumbent re-elected.	▌ ✓ Olin D. Johnston (Democratic); Unopposed
South Dakota	Francis Case	Republican	1950	Incumbent re-elected.	▌ ✓ Francis Case (Republican) 50.8%; ▌Kenneth Holum (Democratic) 49.2%
Utah	Wallace F. Bennett	Republican	1950	Incumbent re-elected.	▌ ✓ Wallace F. Bennett (Republican) 54.0%; ▌Alonzo F. Hopkin (Democratic) 46.0%
Vermont	George Aiken	Republican	1940 (special); 1944; 1950	Incumbent re-elected.	▌ ✓ George Aiken (Republican) 66.4%; ▌Bernard G. O'Shea (Democratic) 33.6%
Washington	Warren Magnuson	Democratic	1944 (appointed); 1944; 1950	Incumbent re-elected.	▌ ✓ Warren Magnuson (Democratic) 61.1%; ▌Arthur B. Langlie (Republican) 38.9%
Wisconsin	Alexander Wiley	Republican	1938; 1944; 1950	Incumbent re-elected.	▌ ✓ Alexander Wiley (Republican) 58.6%; ▌Henry Maier (Democratic) 41.2%

== Closest races ==
Fifteen races had a margin of victory under 10%:

State	Party of winner	Margin
Colorado	Democratic (flip)	0.4% (Note: Colorado was the "tipping-point state".)
Pennsylvania	Democratic (flip)	0.4%
Kentucky	Republican (flip)	0.8%
South Dakota	Republican	1.6%
Nevada	Democratic	5.2%
Ohio	Democratic	5.8%
Maryland	Republican	6.0%
Kentucky (special)	Republican (flip)	6.4%
New York	Republican (flip)	6.6%
West Virginia (special)	Republican (flip)	7.4%
Iowa	Republican	7.8%
Utah	Republican	8.0%
California	Republican	8.34%
Illinois	Republican	8.39%
Oregon	Democratic	8.4%

== Alabama ==
1956 Democratic Senate primary election in Alabama
- May 1, 1956
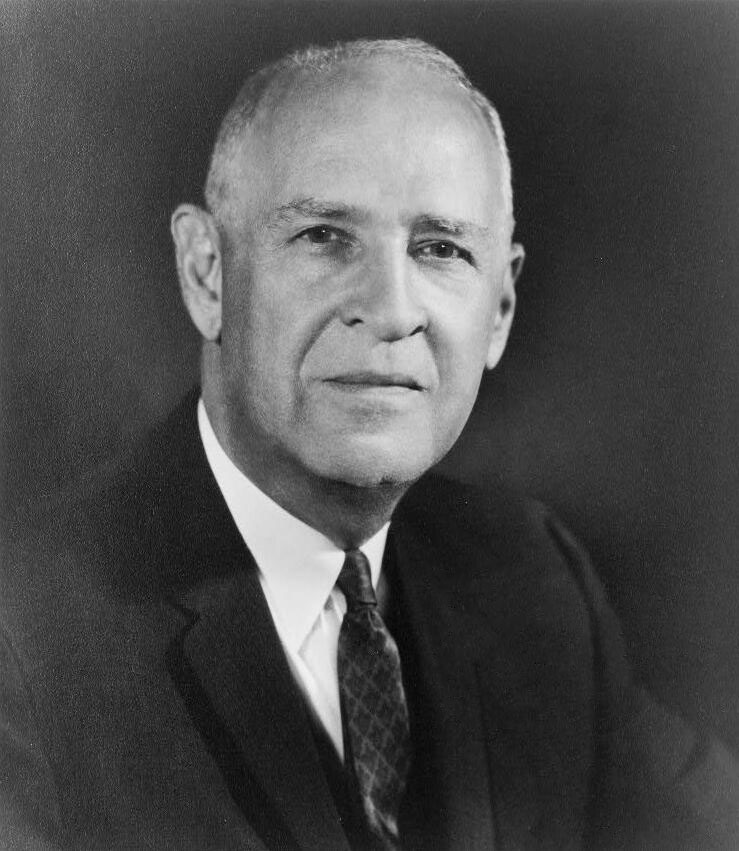

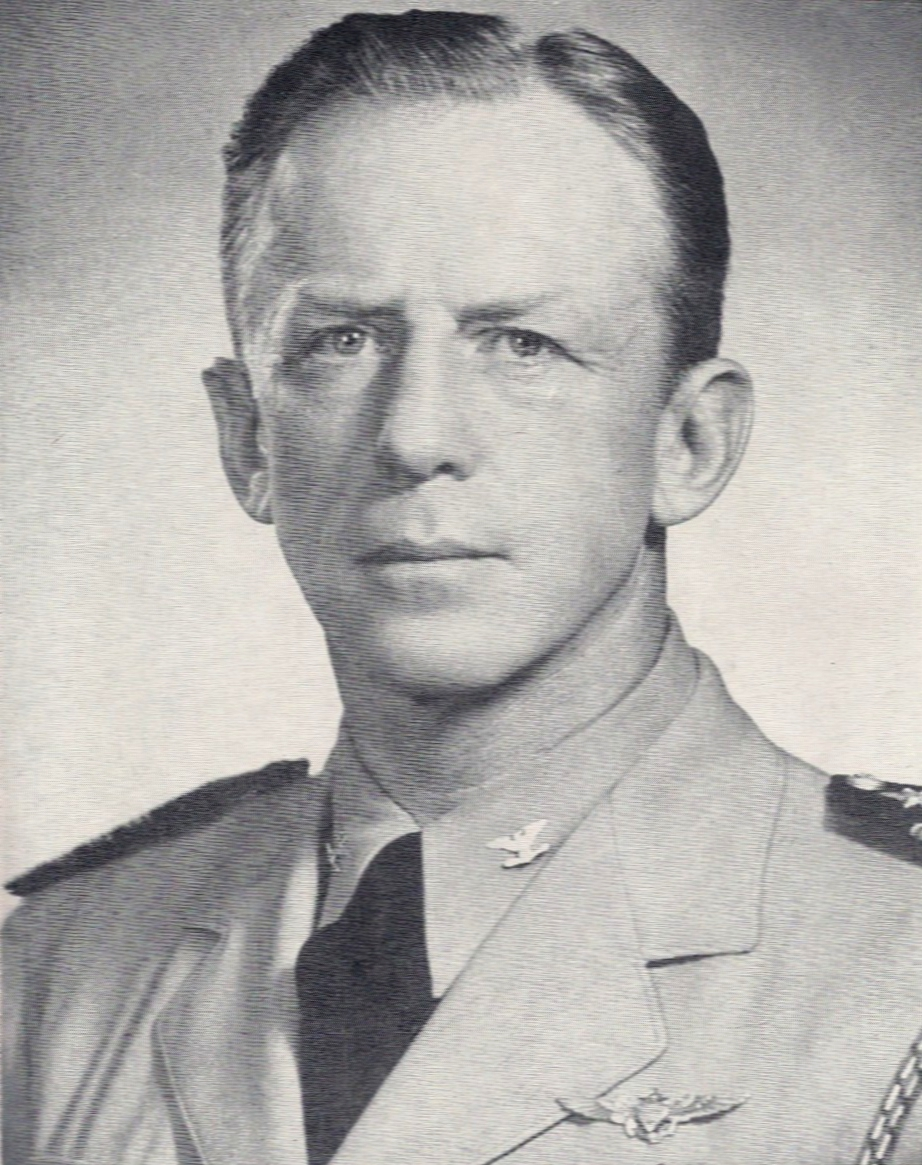
Nominee	J. Lister Hill	John G. Crommelin
Party	Democratic	Democratic
Popular vote	247,519	115,440
Percentage	68.19%	31.81%
- County results Hill: 50–60% 60–70% 70–80% 80–90% >90% Crommelin: 50–60%
U.S. senator before election
J. Lister Hill
Democratic
Elected U.S. Senator
J. Lister Hill
Democratic

United States Senate election in Alabama of 1956
Party	Candidate	Votes	%
Democratic	J. Lister Hill (incumbent)	330,182	100.00
Democratic hold			

== Arizona ==
Arizona election
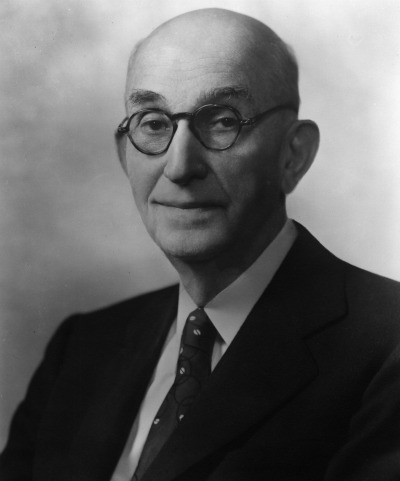

Nominee	Carl Hayden	Ross F. Jones
Party	Democratic	Republican
Popular vote	170,816	107,447
Percentage	61.4%	38.6%
- County results Hayden: 50–60% 60–70% 70–80% 80–90%
U.S. senator before election
Carl Hayden
Democratic
Elected U.S. Senator
Carl Hayden
Democratic

1956 United States Senate election in Arizona
Party	Candidate	Votes	%
Democratic	Carl Hayden (incumbent)	170,816	61.39
Republican	Ross F. Jones	107,447	38.61
Majority		63,369	22.78
Turnout		278,263	
Democratic hold			

== Arkansas ==
1956 U.S. Senate election in Arkansas
- November 6, 1956
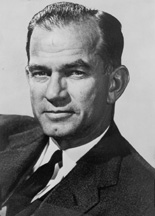

Nominee	J. William Fulbright	Ben C. Henley
Party	Democratic	Republican
Popular vote	331,679	98,013
Percentage	82.98%	17.02%
- County results Fulbright: 50–60% 60–70% 70–80% 80–90% >90% Henley: 50–60%
U.S. senator before election
J. William Fulbright
Democratic
Elected U.S. Senator
J. William Fulbright
Democratic

1956 United States Senate election in Arkansas
Party	Candidate	Votes	%
Democratic	J. William Fulbright (incumbent)	331,689	82.98
Republican	Ben C. Henley	68,016	17.02
Majority		263,673	65.96
Turnout		399,705	
Democratic hold			

== California ==
1956 United States Senate election in California
- November 6, 1956
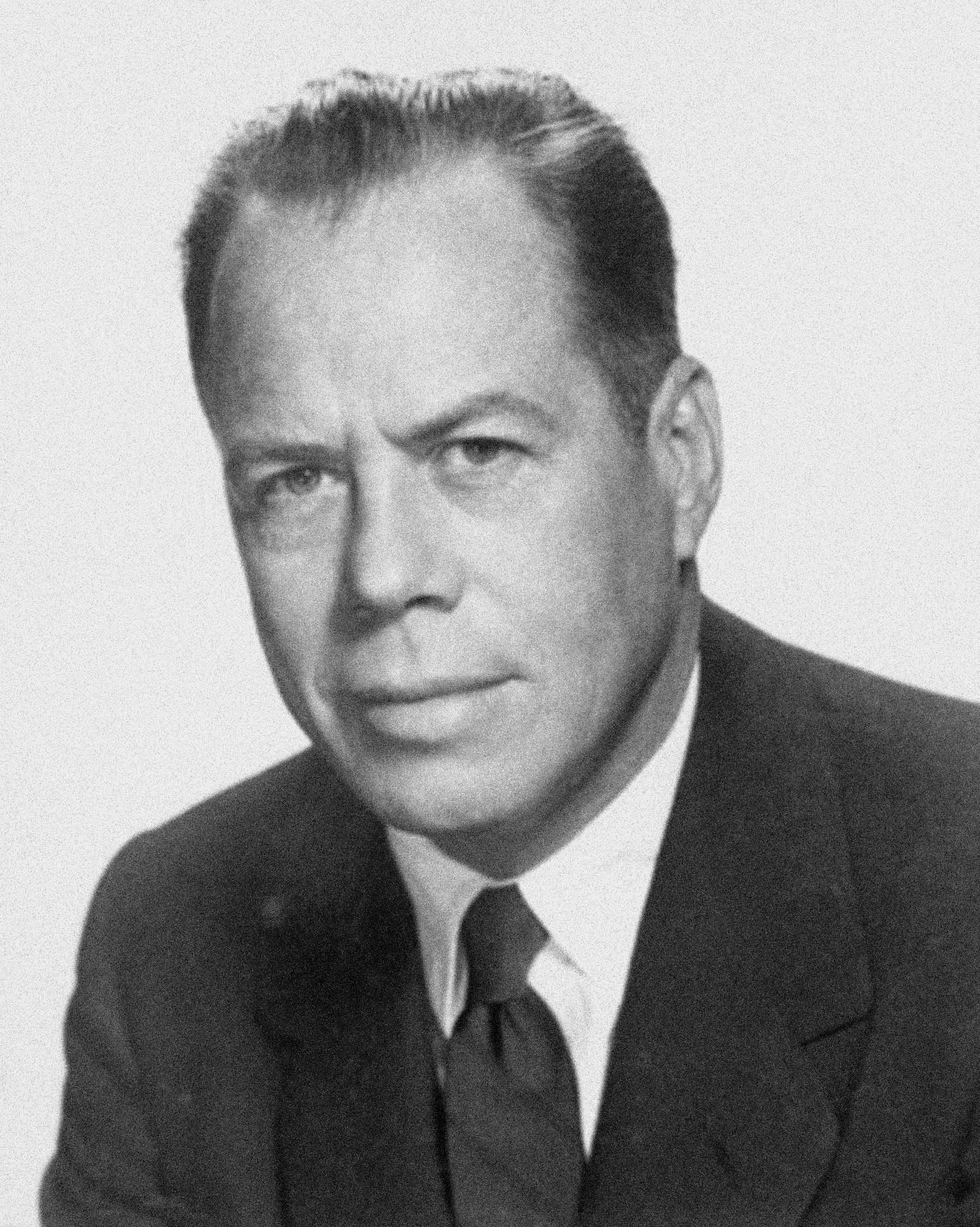

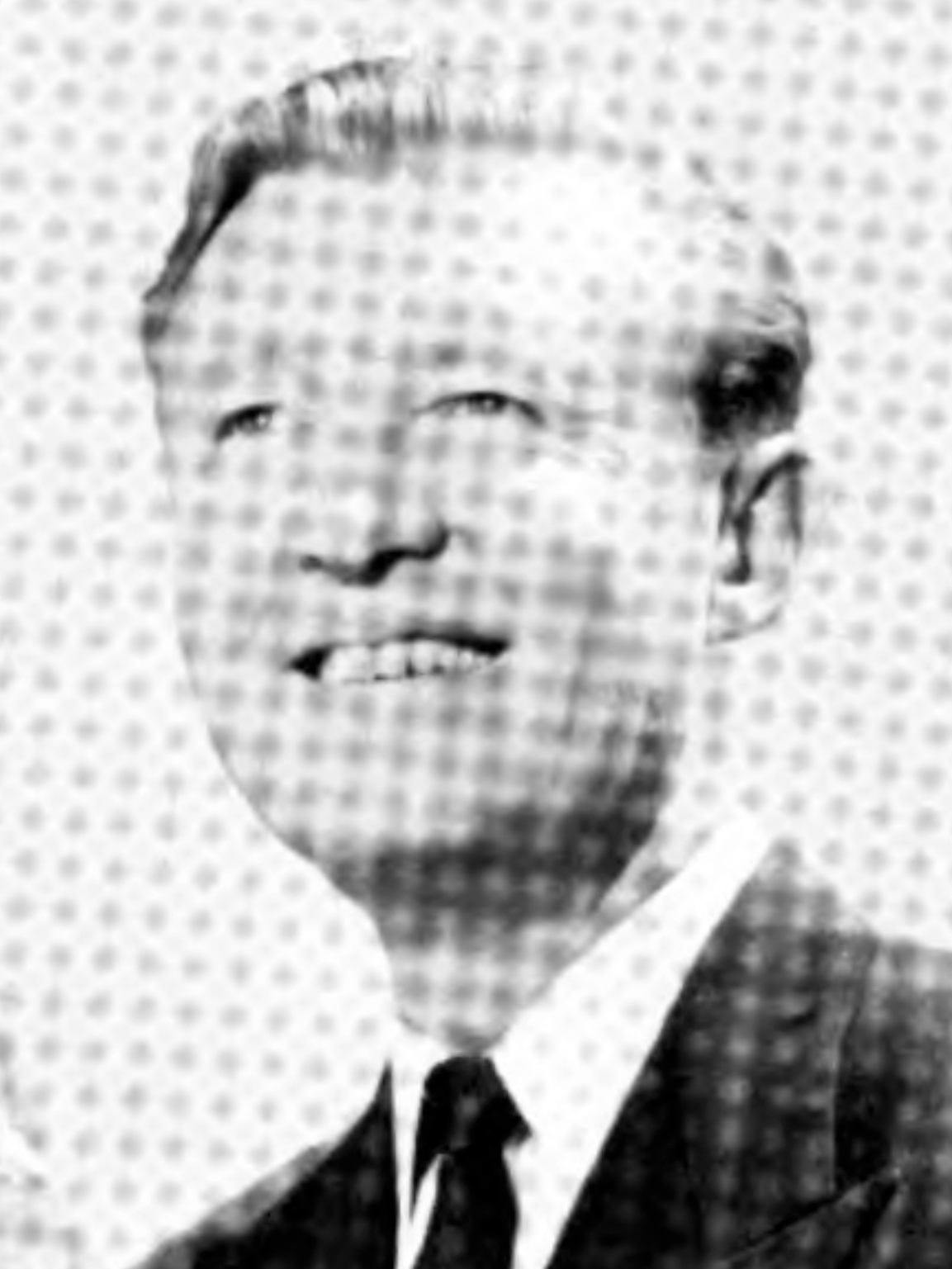
Nominee	Thomas Kuchel	Richard Richards
Party	Republican	Democratic
Popular vote	2,892,918	2,445,816
Percentage	53.96%	45.62%
- County results Kuchel: 40–50% 50–60% 60–70% 70–80% 80–90% Richards: 40–50% 50–60%
U.S. senator before election
Thomas Kuchel
Republican
Elected U.S. Senator
Thomas Kuchel
Republican

1956 United States Senate election in California
Party	Candidate	Votes	%
Republican	Thomas Kuchel (incumbent)	2,892,918	53.96
Democratic	Richard Richards	2,445,816	45.62
Prohibition	Ray Gourley	22,410	0.42
None	Scattering	323	0.01
Majority		447,102	8.34
Turnout		5,361,467	
Republican hold			

== Colorado ==
1956 United States Senate election in Colorado
- November 6, 1956
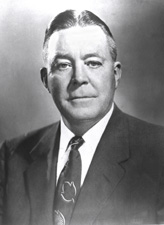

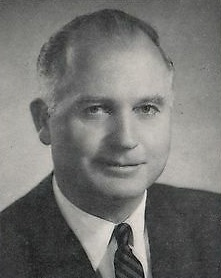
Nominee	John A. Carroll	Daniel I. J. Thornton
Party	Democratic	Republican
Popular vote	319,872	317,102
Percentage	50.22%	49.78%
- Results by county Carroll: 50–60% 60–70% Thornton: 50–60% 60–70%
U.S. senator before election
Eugene Millikin
Republican
Elected U.S. Senator
John A. Carroll
Democratic

1956 United States Senate election in Colorado
Party	Candidate	Votes	%
Democratic	John A. Carroll	319,872	50.22
Republican	Dan Thornton	317,102	49.78
Majority		2,770	0.44
Turnout		636,974	
Democratic gain from Republican			

== Connecticut ==
1956 United States Senate election in Connecticut
- November 6, 1956
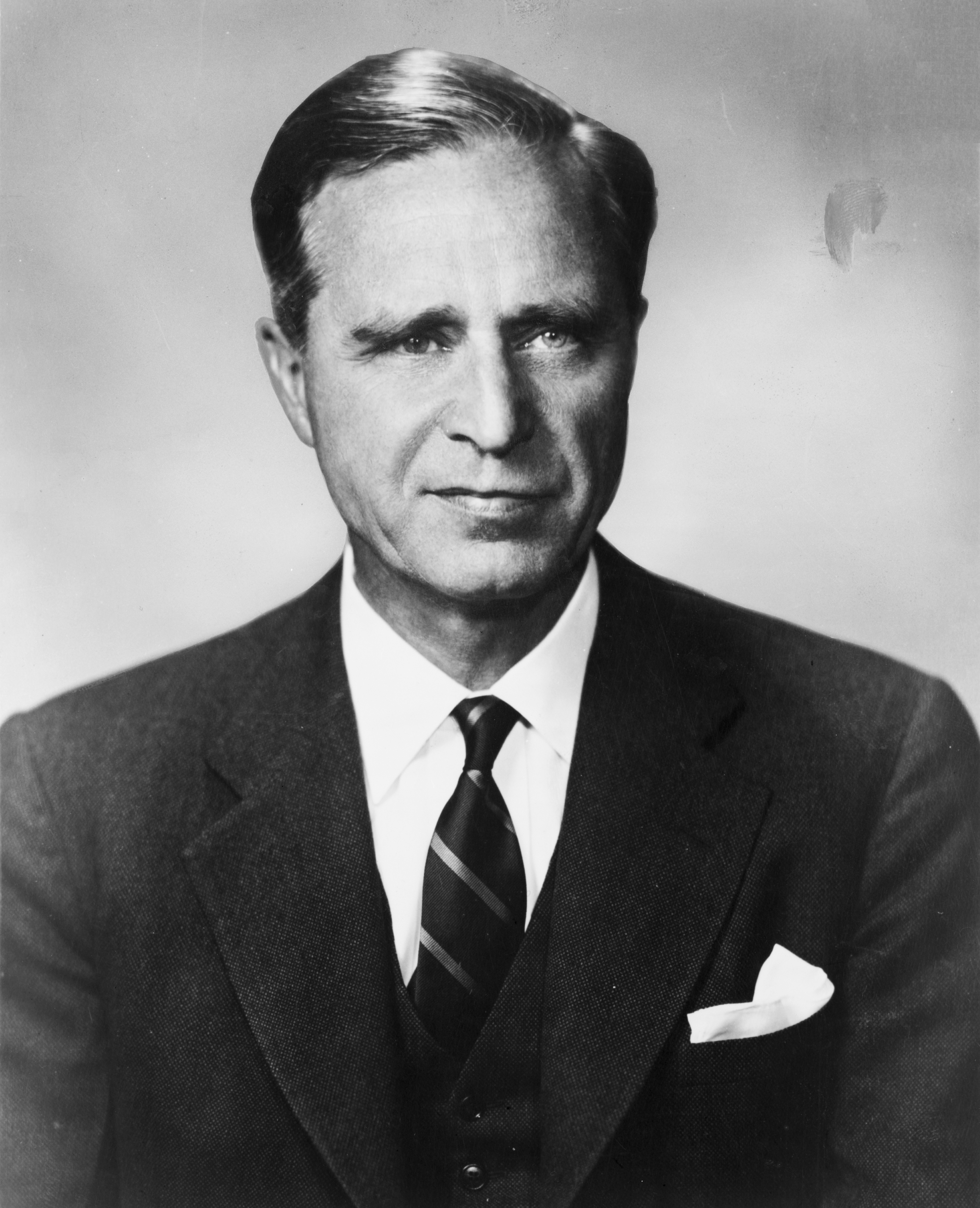

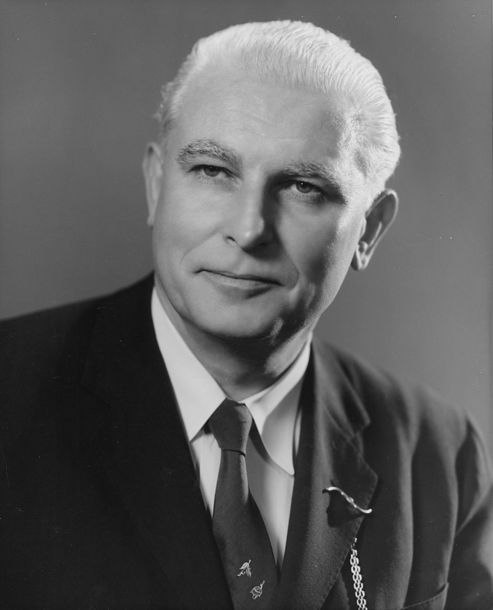
Nominee	Prescott Bush	Thomas J. Dodd
Party	Republican	Democratic
Popular vote	610,829	479,460
Percentage	54.84%	43.05%
- Bush: 40-50% 50-60% 60-70% 70-80% 80-90% Dodd: 40–50% 50–60% 60-70%
U.S. senator before election
Prescott Bush
Republican
Elected U.S. Senator
Prescott Bush
Republican

1956 United States Senate election in Connecticut
Party	Candidate	Votes	%
Republican	Prescott Bush (incumbent)	610,829	54.84
Democratic	Thomas J. Dodd	479,460	43.05
Independent Republican	Suzanne S. Stevenson	10,199	0.92
Socialist	Jasper McLevy	7,079	0.64
Write-In	Vivien Kellems	6,219	0.56
None	Scattering	33	0.00
Majority		131,369	11.79
Turnout		1,113,819	
Republican hold			

== Florida ==
1956 United States Senate election in Florida
- May 8, 1956
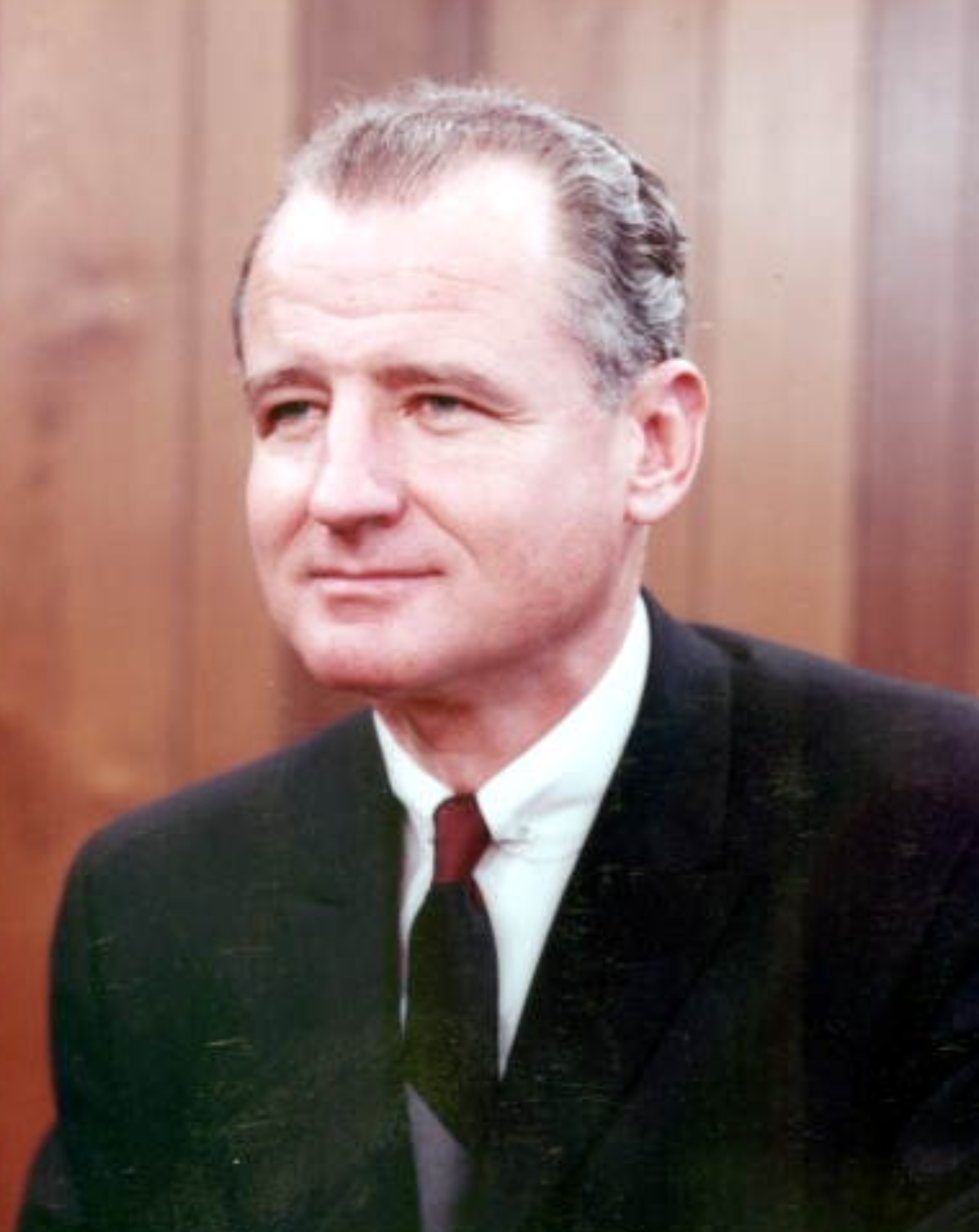
Nominee	George Smathers
Party	Democratic
Popular vote	655,418
Percentage	100.0%
- County results Smathers: 90-100%
U.S. senator before election
George Smathers
Democratic
Elected U.S. Senator
George Smathers
Democratic

1956 United States Senate election in Florida
Party	Candidate	Votes	%
Democratic	George A. Smathers (incumbent)	655,418	100.00
Democratic hold			

== Georgia ==
1956 United States Senate election in Georgia
Party	Candidate	Votes	%
Democratic	Herman Talmadge	541,094	99.97
None	Scattering	173	0.03
Majority		540,921	99.94
Turnout		541,267	
Democratic hold			

== Idaho ==
1956 United States Senate election in Idaho
- November 6, 1956
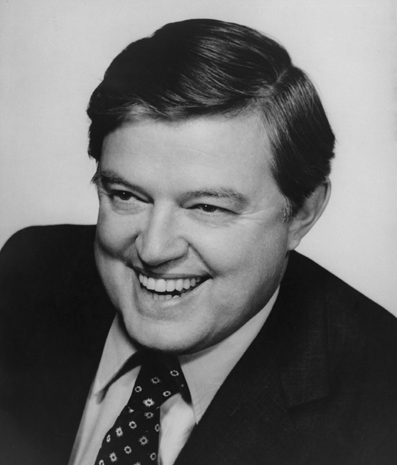

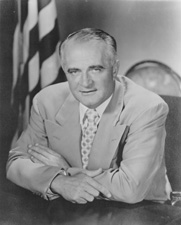

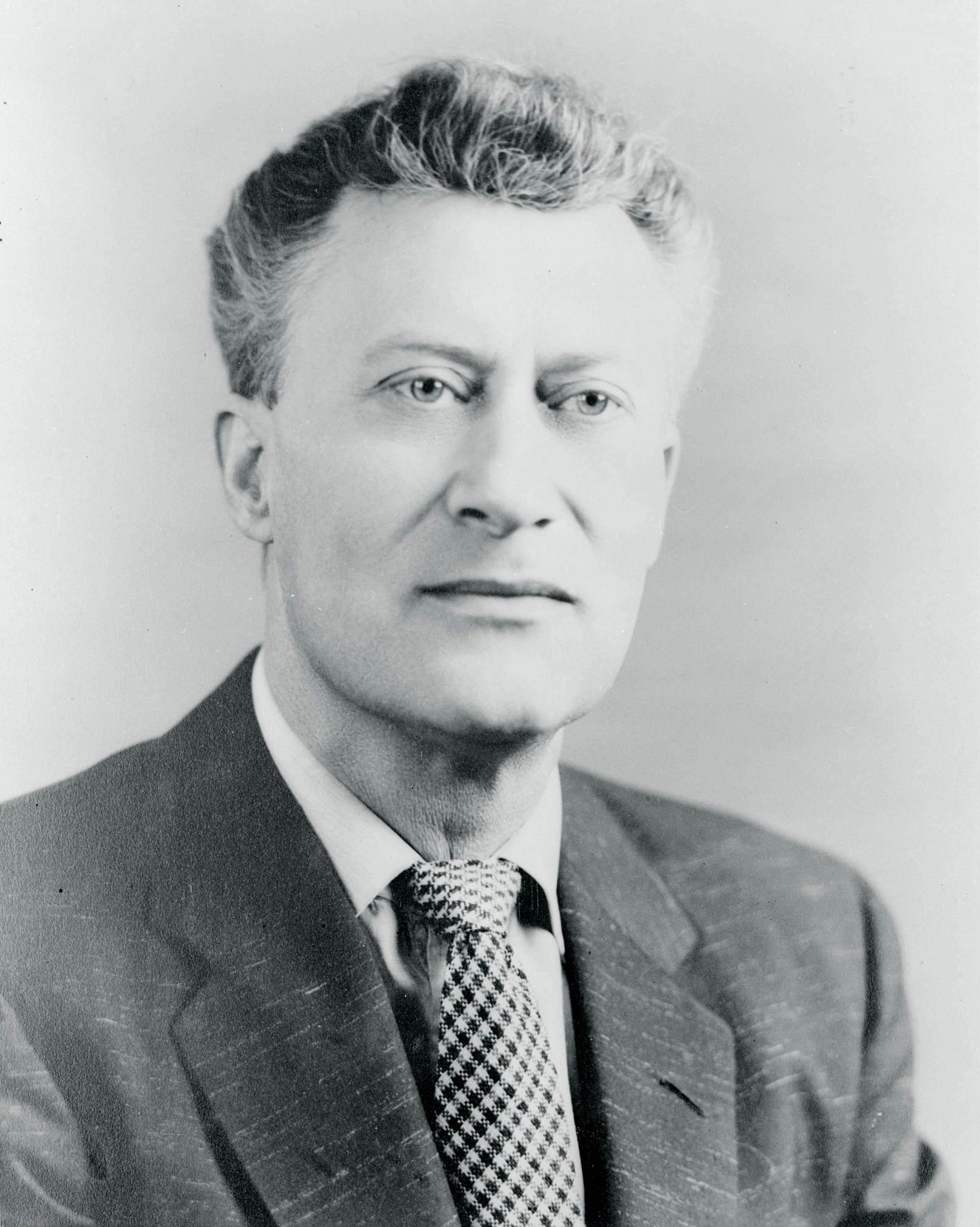
Nominee	Frank Church	Herman Welker	Glen H. Taylor (Write-in)
Party	Democratic	Republican	Independent
Popular vote	149,096	102,781	13,415
Percentage	56.20%	38.74%	5.06%
- County results Church: 40–50% 50–60% 60–70% 70–80% Welker: 40–50% 50-60%
U.S. senator before election
Herman Welker
Republican
Elected U.S. Senator
Frank Church
Democratic

1956 United States Senate election in Idaho
Party	Candidate	Votes	%
Democratic	Frank Church	149,096	56.20
Republican	Herman Welker (incumbent)	102,781	38.74
Write-in	Glen Taylor	13,415	5.06
Majority		46,315	17.46
Turnout		265,292	
Democratic gain from Republican			

== Illinois ==
Illinois election
- Turnout: 81.74%
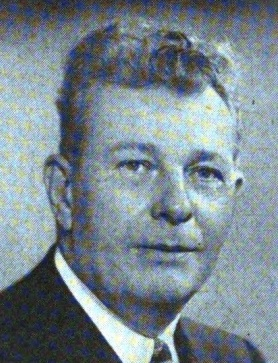

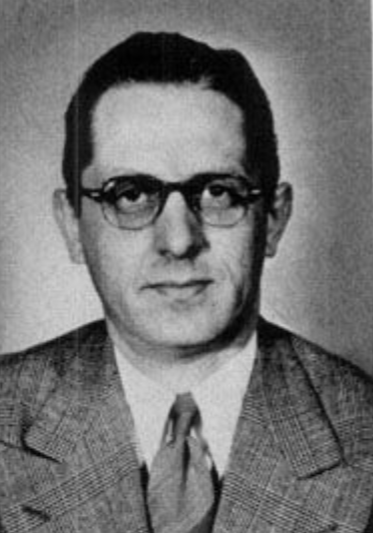
Nominee	Everett M. Dirksen	Richard Stengel
Party	Republican	Democratic
Popular vote	2,307,552	1,949,883
Percentage	54.11%	45.72%
- County results Dirksen: 50-60% 60-70% 70-80% Stengel: 50–60%
Senator before election
Everett M. Dirksen
Republican
Elected Senator
Everett M. Dirksen
Republican

1956 United States Senate election in Illinois
Party	Candidate	Votes	%
Republican	Everett Dirksen (incumbent)	2,307,352	54.10
Democratic	Richard Stengel	1,949,883	45.72
Socialist Labor	Louis Fisher	7,587	0.18
None	Scattering	8	0.00
Majority		357,469	8.38
Turnout		4,264,830	
Republican hold			

== Indiana ==
1956 United States Senate election in Indiana
- November 6, 1956
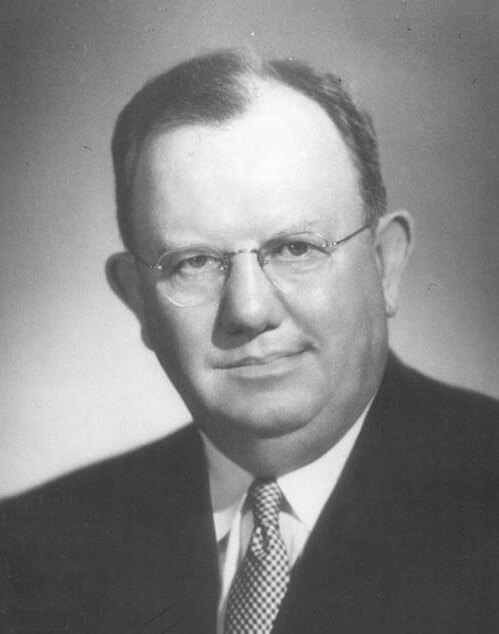

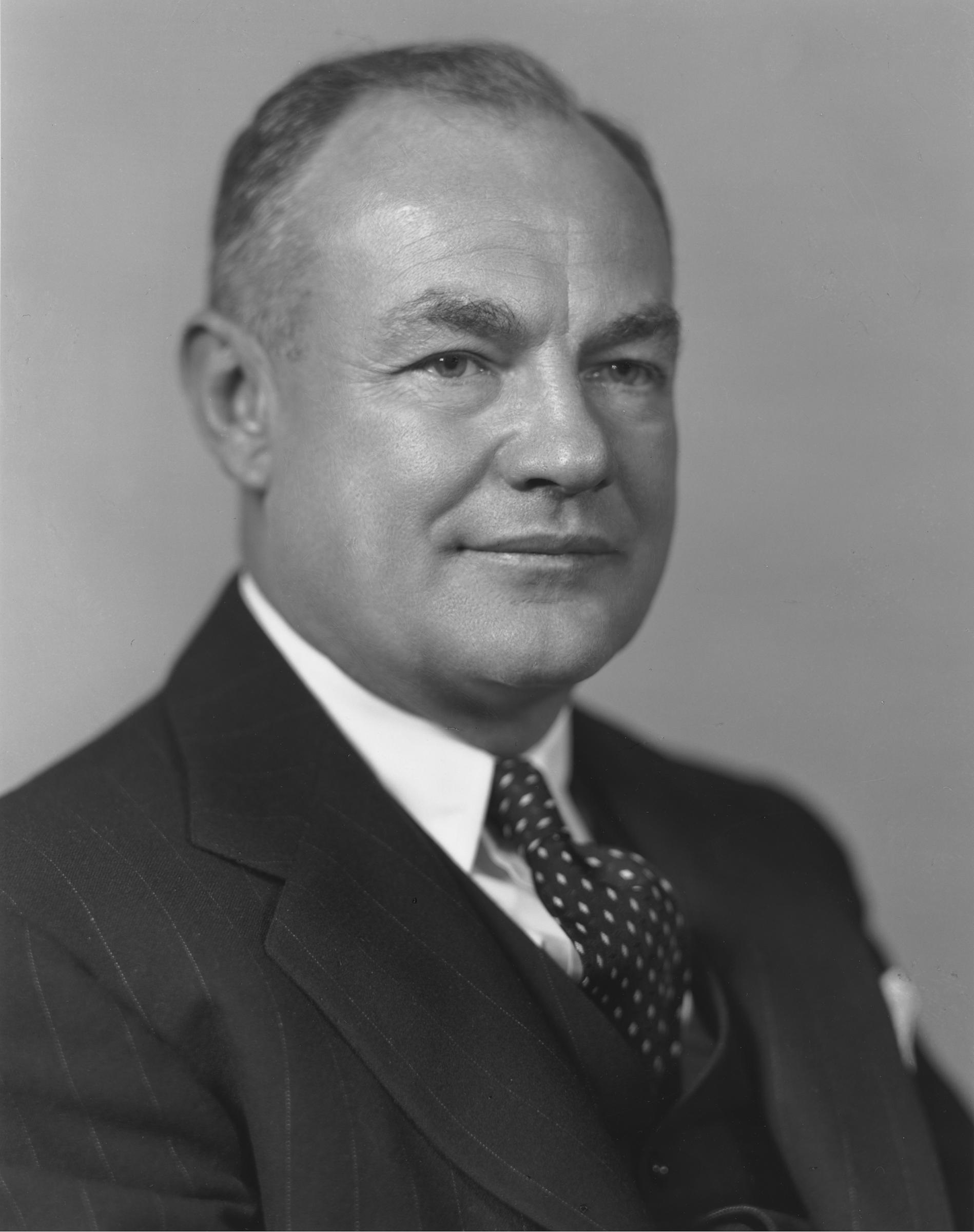
Nominee	Homer Capehart	Claude Wickard
Party	Republican	Democratic
Popular vote	1,084,262	871,781
Percentage	55.21%	44.39%
- County results Capehart: 50–60% 60-70% 70-80% Wickard: 40–50% 50–60%
U.S. senator before election
Homer Capehart
Republican
Elected U.S. Senator
Homer Capehart
Republican

1956 United States Senate election in Indiana
Party	Candidate	Votes	%
Republican	Homer Capehart (incumbent)	1,084,262	55.20
Democratic	Claude R. Wickard	871,781	44.39
Prohibition	Carl W. Thompson	6,685	0.34
Socialist Labor	Gordon A. Long	1,258	0.06
Majority		212,481	10.81
Turnout		1,963,986	
Republican hold			

== Iowa ==
1956 United States Senate election in Iowa
- November 6, 1956
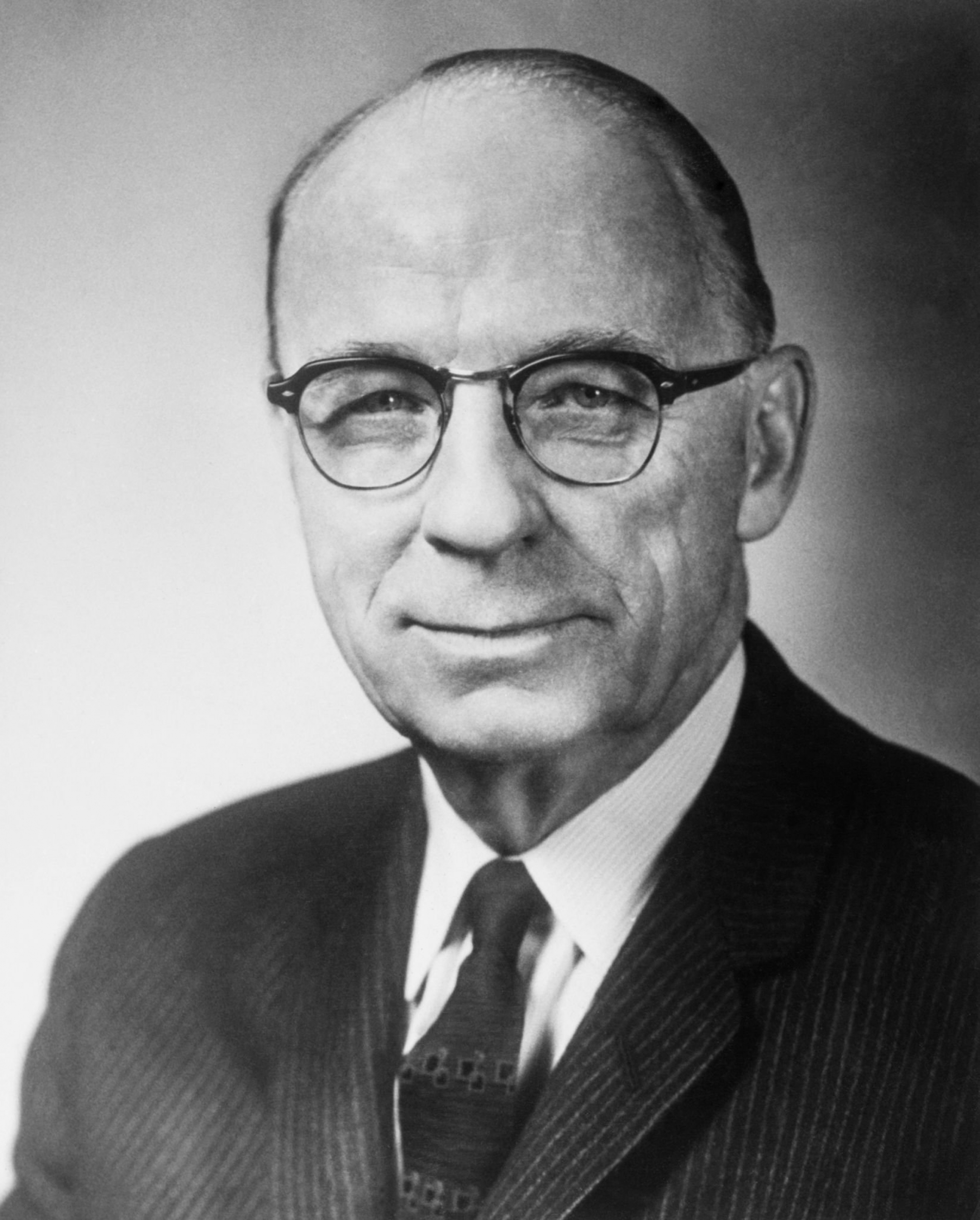

Nominee	Bourke B. Hickenlooper	Rudolph M. Evans
Party	Republican	Democratic
Popular vote	635,499	543,156
Percentage	53.92%	46.08%
- County results Stanley: 50-60% 60-70% 70-80% Evans: 50–60%
U.S. senator before election
Bourke B. Hickenlooper
Republican
Elected U.S. Senator
Bourke B. Hickenlooper
Republican

1956 United States Senate election in Iowa
Party	Candidate	Votes	%
Republican	Bourke B. Hickenlooper (incumbent)	635,499	53.92
Democratic	Rudolph M. Evans	543,156	46.08
Majority		92,343	7.84
Turnout		1,178,655	
Republican hold			

== Kansas ==
1956 United States Senate election in Kansas
- November 6, 1956
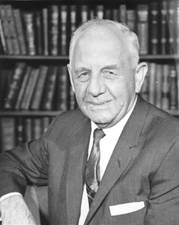

Nominee	Frank Carlson	George Hart
Party	Republican	Democratic
Popular vote	477,822	333,939
Percentage	57.90%	40.46%
- County results Carlson: 40–50% 50–60% 60–70% 70–80% Hart: 50–60%
U.S. senator before election
Frank Carlson
Republican
Elected U.S. Senator
Frank Carlson
Republican

1956 United States Senate election in Kansas
Party	Candidate	Votes	%
Republican	Frank Carlson (incumbent)	477,822	57.90
Democratic	George Hart	333,939	40.46
Prohibition	C. Floyd Hester	13,519	1.64
Majority		143,883	17.44
Turnout		825,280	
Republican hold			

== Kentucky ==
Two elections in Kentucky converted both seats from Democratic to Republican. As a result, this marked the first time since 1916 that both Senate seats in a state flipped from one party to the other in a single election cycle.

=== Kentucky (special) ===
1956 United States Senate special election in Kentucky
- November 6, 1956
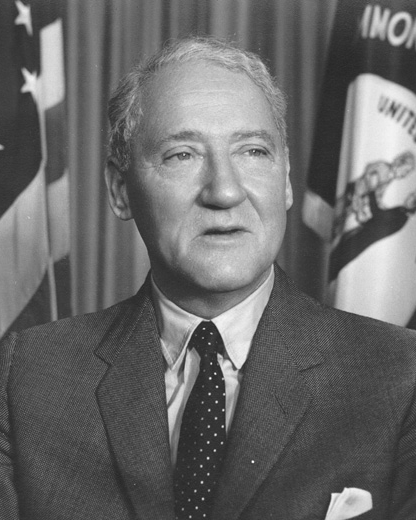

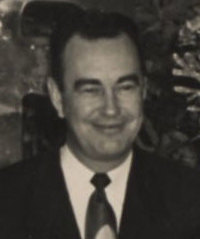
Nominee	John Sherman Cooper	Lawrence Wetherby
Party	Republican	Democratic
Popular vote	538,505	473,140
Percentage	53.23%	46.77%
- County results Sherman: 50-60% 60-70% 70–80% 80–90% Wetherby: 50–60% 60–70% 70–80%
U.S. senator before election
Robert Humphreys
Democratic
Elected U.S. Senator
John Sherman Cooper
Republican

Following the death of Alben Barkley on April 30, 1956, Robert Humphreys was appointed June 21, 1956 to continue the term, pending a special election. Humphreys did not run in the special election to finish the term that would end in 1961.

Republican former Senator John Sherman Cooper, who had twice won special elections to that seat in 1946 and 1952, was again elected to finish the term.

1956 United States Senate special election in Kentucky
Party	Candidate	Votes	%
Republican	John Sherman Cooper	538,505	53.23
Democratic	Lawrence W. Wetherby	473,140	46.77
Majority		65,365	6.46
Turnout		1,011,645	
Republican gain from Democratic			

This time, however, Cooper would be re-elected in 1960 and again in 1966, serving until his 1973 retirement.

=== Kentucky (regular) ===
1956 United States Senate election in Kentucky
- November 6, 1956
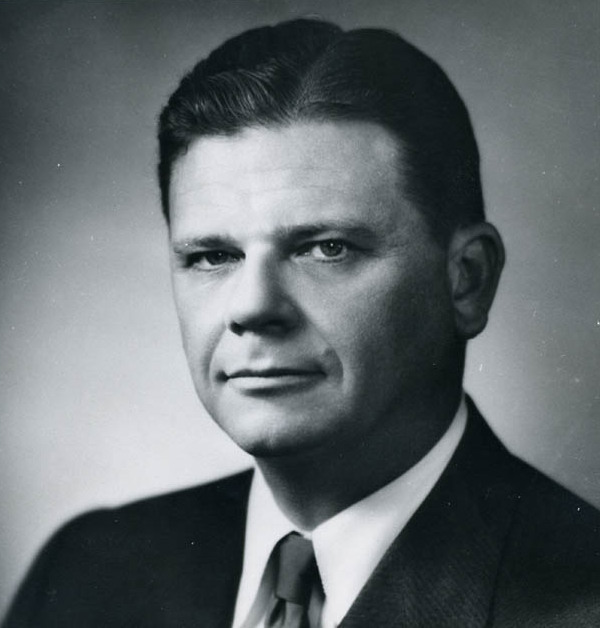

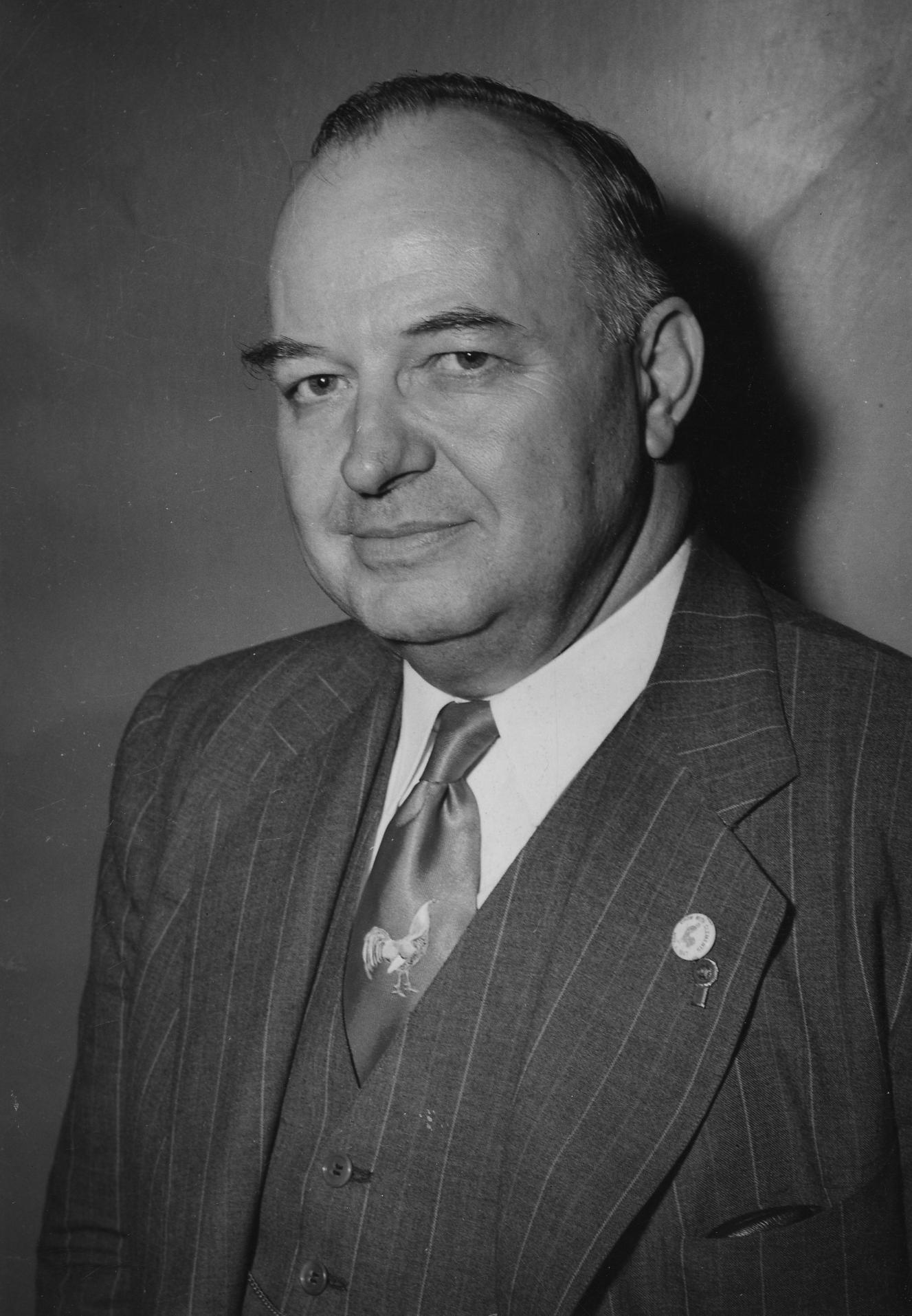
Nominee	Thruston Ballard Morton	Earle Clements
Party	Republican	Democratic
Popular vote	506,903	499,922
Percentage	50.35%	49.65%
- County results Morton: 50–60% 60–70% 70–80% 80–90% Clements: 50–60% 60–70% 70–80% 80–90%
U.S. senator before election
Earle Clements
Democratic
Elected U.S. Senator
Thruston Ballard Morton
Republican

First-term Democrat Earle Clements lost re-election to Republican Thruston B. Morton, who was Eisenhower's assistant secretary of state for legislative affairs.

1956 United States Senate election in Kentucky
Party	Candidate	Votes	%
Republican	Thruston B. Morton	506,903	50.35
Democratic	Earle Clements (incumbent)	499,922	49.65
Majority		6,981	0.70
Turnout		1,006,825	
Republican gain from Democratic			

== Louisiana ==
1956 United States Senate election in Louisiana
- November 6, 1956
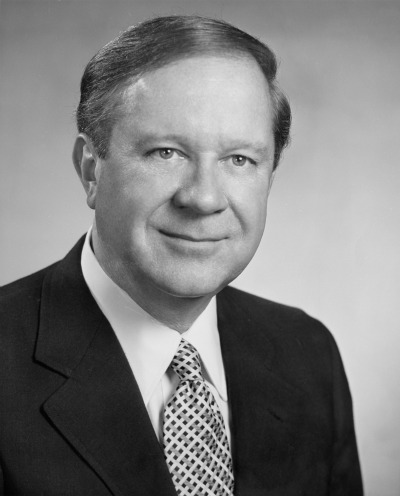
Nominee	Russell B. Long
Party	Democratic
Popular vote	335,564
Percentage	100.00%
- Parish results Long: >90%
U.S. senator before election
Russell B. Long
Democratic
Elected U.S. Senator
Russell B. Long
Democratic

1956 United States Senate election in Louisiana
Party	Candidate	Votes	%
Democratic	Russell Long (incumbent)	335,564	100.00
Democratic hold			

== Maryland ==
1956 United States Senate election in Maryland
- November 6, 1956
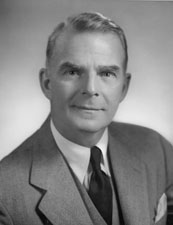

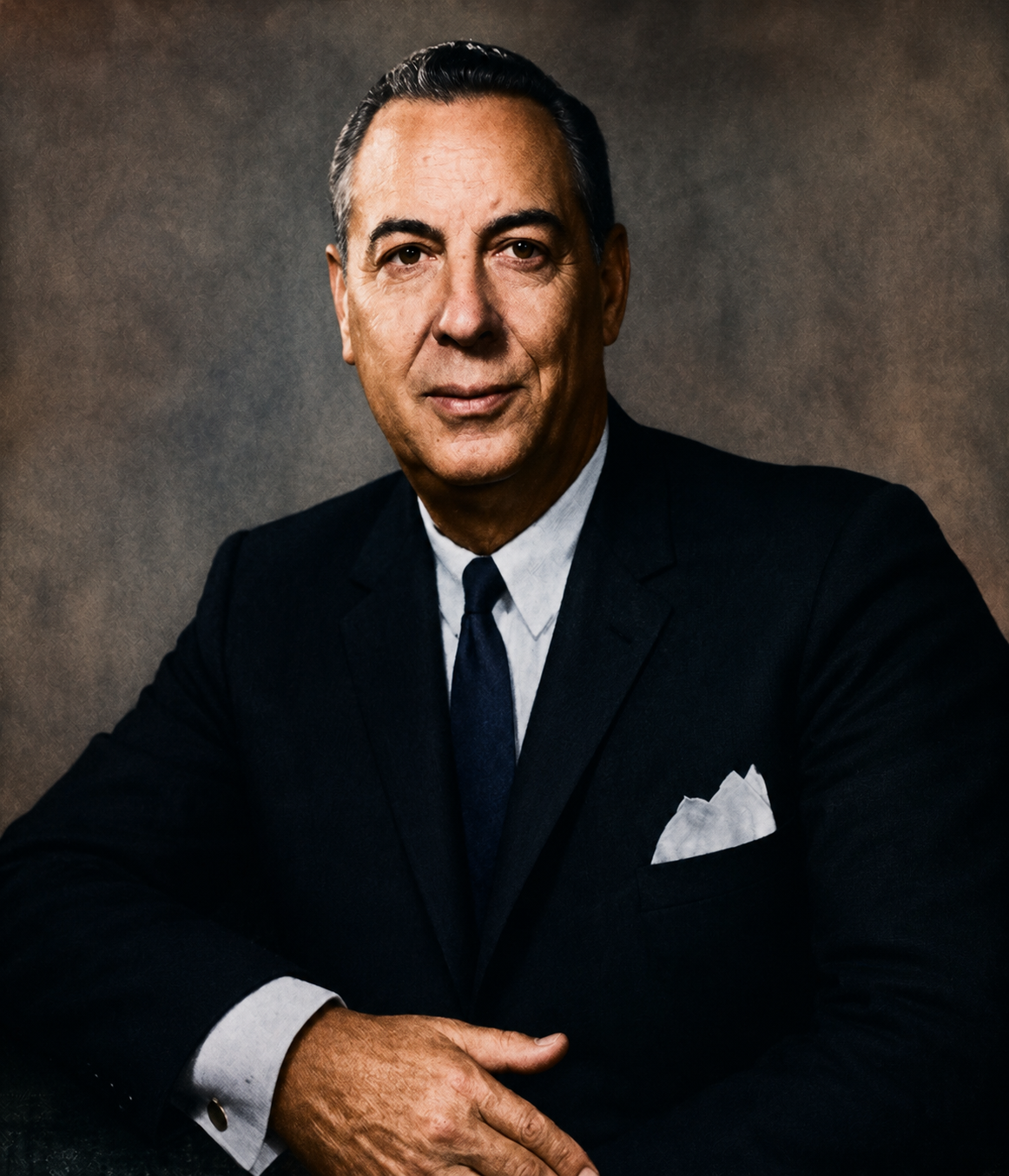
Nominee	John Marshall Butler	George P. Mahoney
Party	Republican	Democratic
Popular vote	473,059	420,108
Percentage	52.96%	47.04%
- County results Butler: 50–60% 60–70% Mahoney: 50–60%
U.S. senator before election
John Marshall Butler
Republican
Elected U.S. Senator
John Marshall Butler
Republican

1956 United States Senate election in Maryland
Party	Candidate	Votes	%
Republican	John Marshall Butler (incumbent)	473,059	52.96
Democratic	George P. Mahoney	420,108	47.04
Majority		52,951	5.92
Turnout		893,167	
Republican hold			

== Missouri ==
1956 United States Senate election in Missouri
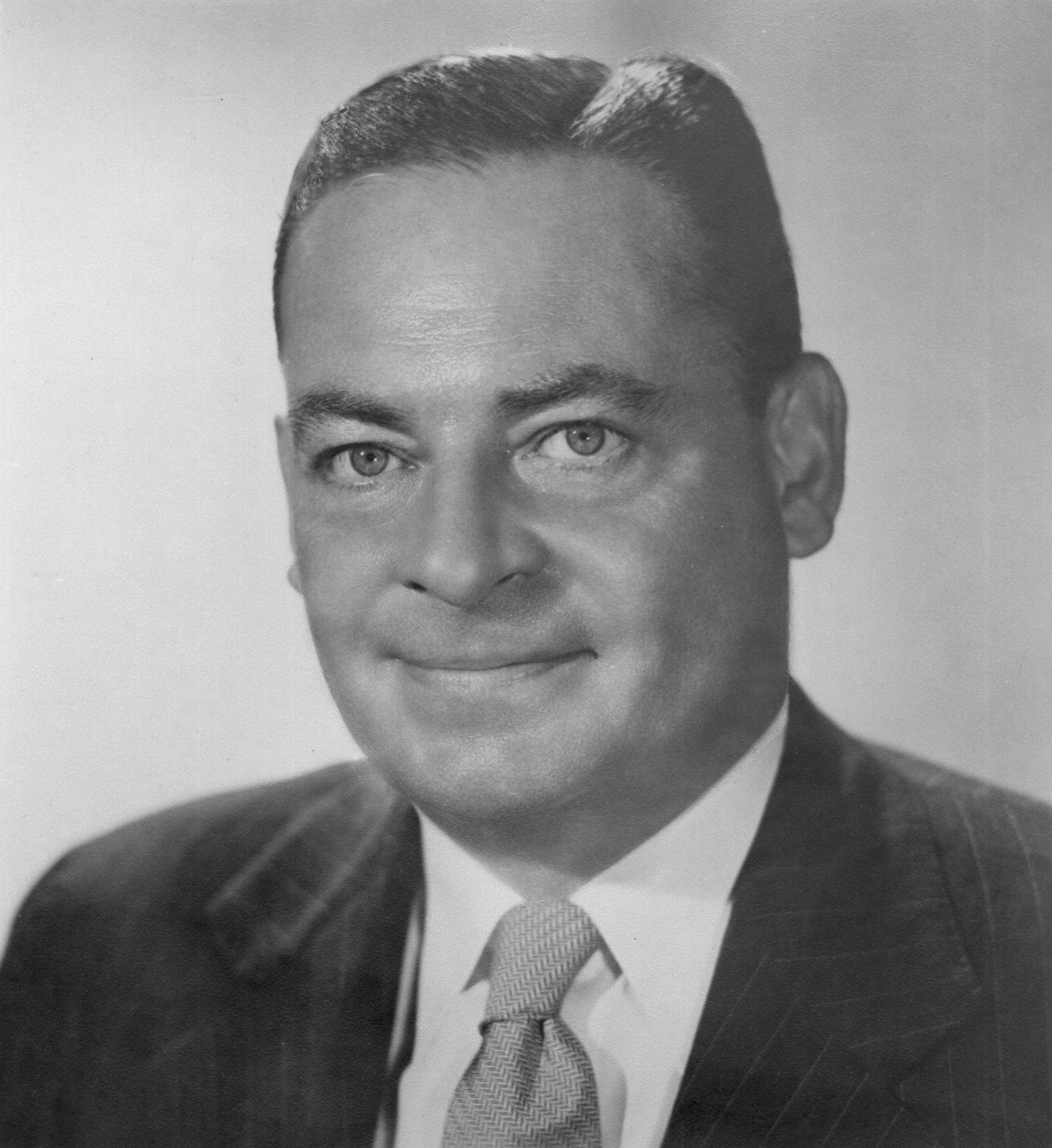

Nominee	Thomas C. Hennings Jr.	Herbert Douglas
Party	Democratic	Republican
Popular vote	1,015,936	785,048
Percentage	56.41%	43.59%
- County results Hennings: 50–60% 60–70% 70–80% 80–90% Douglas: 50–60% 60–70% 70–80%
U.S. senator before election
Thomas C. Hennings Jr.
Democratic
Elected U.S. senator
Thomas C. Hennings Jr.
Democratic

1956 United States Senate election in Missouri
Party	Candidate	Votes	%
Democratic	Thomas C. Hennings Jr. (incumbent)	1,015,936	56.41
Republican	Herbert Douglas	785,048	43.59
Majority		230,888	12.82
Turnout		1,800,984	
Democratic hold			

== Nevada ==
1956 United States Senate election in Nevada
- November 6, 1956
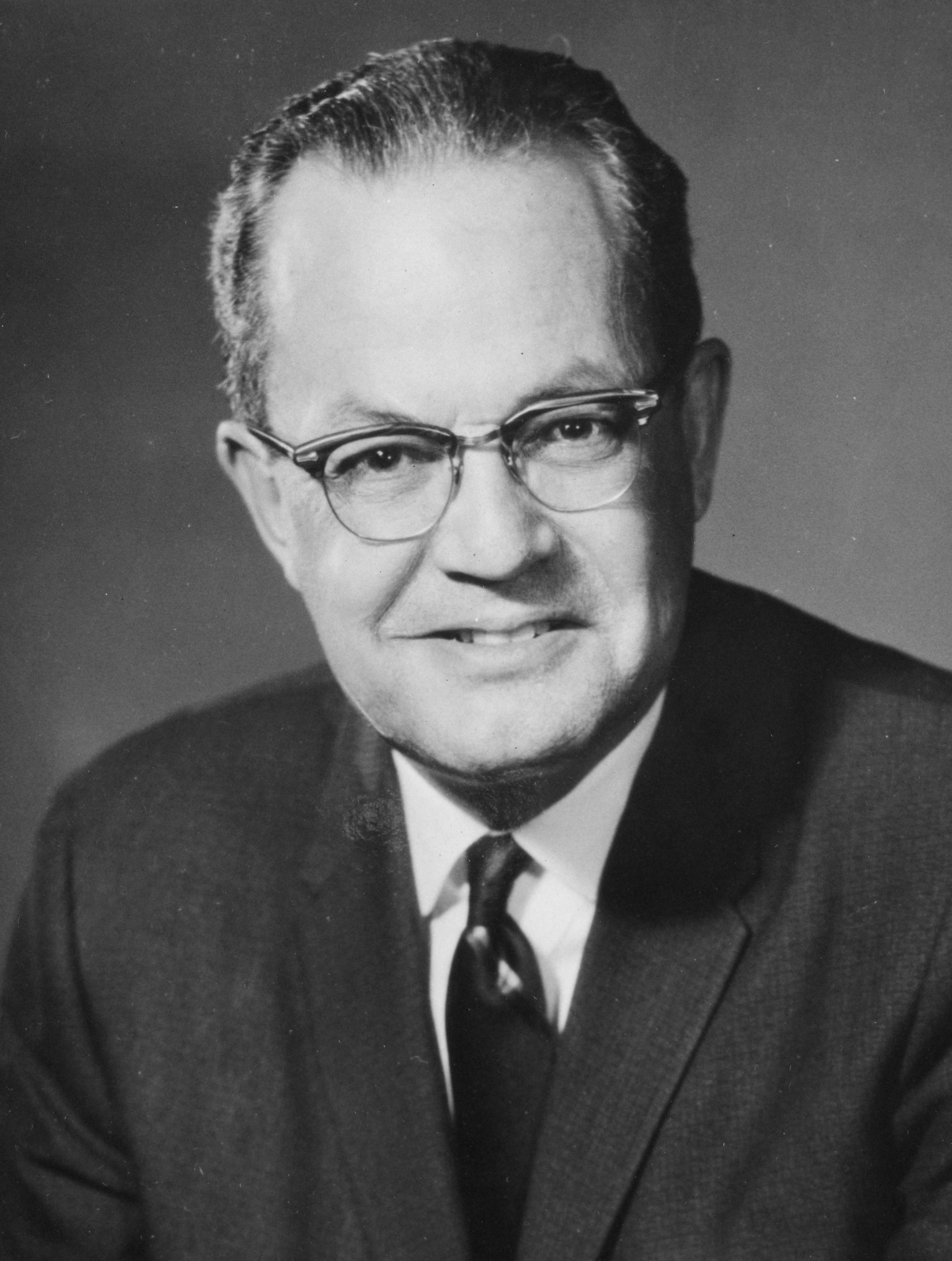

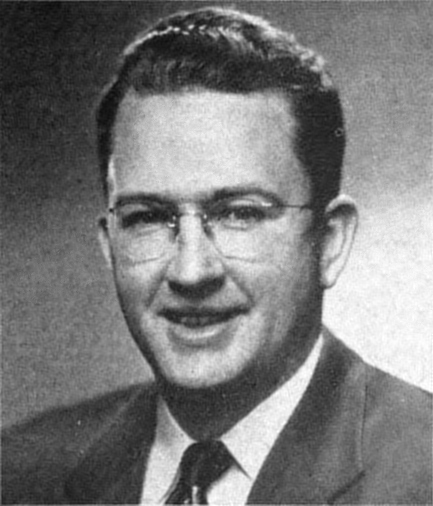
Nominee	Alan Bible	Cliff Young
Party	Democratic	Republican
Popular vote	50,677	45,712
Percentage	52.58%	47.42%
- County results Bible: 50–60% 60–70% Young: 50–60% 60–70%
U.S. senator before election
Alan Bible
Democratic
Elected U.S. Senator
Alan Bible
Democratic

1956 United States Senate election in Nevada
Party	Candidate	Votes	%
Democratic	Alan Bible (incumbent)	50,677	52.58
Republican	Cliff Young	45,712	47.42
Majority		4,965	5.16
Turnout		96,389	
Democratic hold			

== New Hampshire ==
1956 United States Senate election in New Hampshire
- November 6, 1956
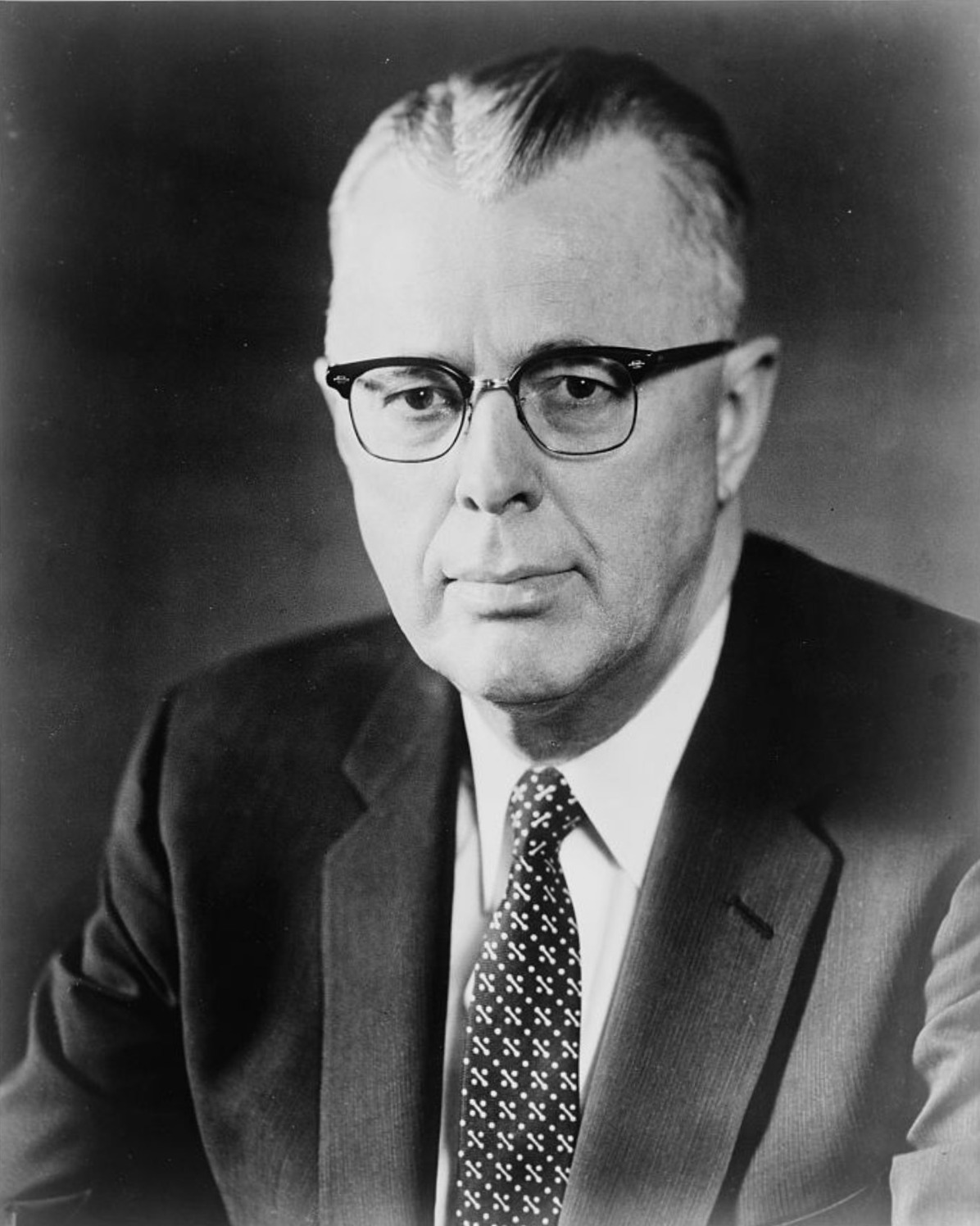

Nominee	Norris Cotton	Laurence M. Pickett
Party	Republican	Democratic
Popular vote	161,424	90,519
Percentage	64.07%	35.93%
- Cotton: 50–60% 60–70% 70–80% 80–90% 90-100% Pickett: 50–60% 60–70% 70–80%
U.S. senator before election
Norris Cotton
Republican
Elected U.S. Senator
Norris Cotton
Republican

1956 United States Senate election in New Hampshire
Party	Candidate	Votes	%
Republican	Norris Cotton (incumbent)	161,424	64.07
Democratic	Laurence M. Pickett	90,519	35.93
Majority		70,905	28.14
Turnout		251,943	
Republican hold			

== New York ==
1956 United States Senate election in New York
- November 6, 1956
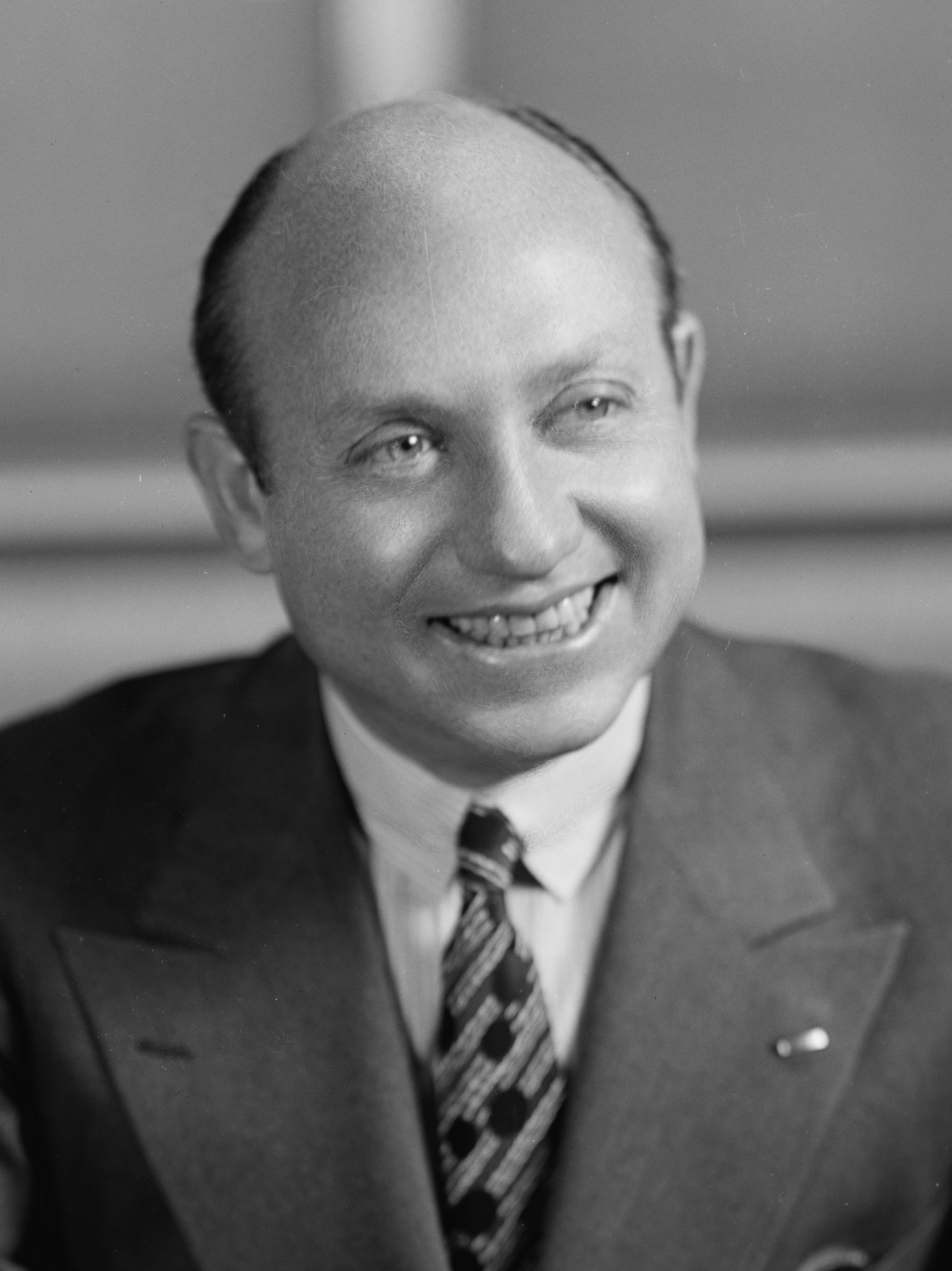

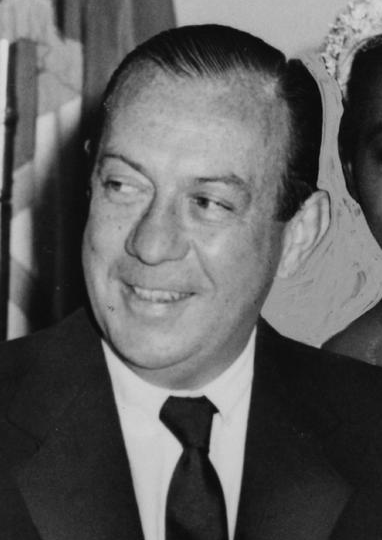
Nominee	Jacob Javits	Robert F. Wagner Jr.
Party	Republican	Democratic
Alliance		Liberal
Popular vote	3,723,933	3,265,159
Percentage	53.27%	46.71%
- County results Javits: 50–60% 60–70% 70–80% Wagner: 50–60% 60–70%
U.S. senator before election
Herbert H. Lehman
Democratic
Elected U.S. Senator
Jacob Javits
Republican

In New York, the Republican state convention met on September 10 at Albany, New York, and nominated New York State Attorney General Jacob K. Javits. The Democratic state convention met on September 10 at Albany, New York, and nominated Mayor of New York City Robert F. Wagner Jr., for the U.S. Senate. The Liberal Party endorsed the Democratic nominee, Mayor Robert F. Wagner Jr., for the U.S. Senate. On October 1, a movement was launched to vote for General of the Army Douglas MacArthur as a write-in candidate for the U.S. Senate. On October 2, MacArthur disavowed the campaign, and stated that he was not a candidate.

The Republican candidate was elected.

1956 United States Senate election in New York
Party	Candidate	Votes	%
Republican	Jacob Javits	3,723,933	53.26
Democratic	Robert F. Wagner Jr.	3,265,159	46.70
None	Scattering	1,390	0.02
None	Miscellaneous	654	0.01
Majority		458,774	6.56
Turnout		6,991,136	
Republican gain from Democratic			

== North Carolina ==
1956 United States Senate election in North Carolina
- November 6, 1956
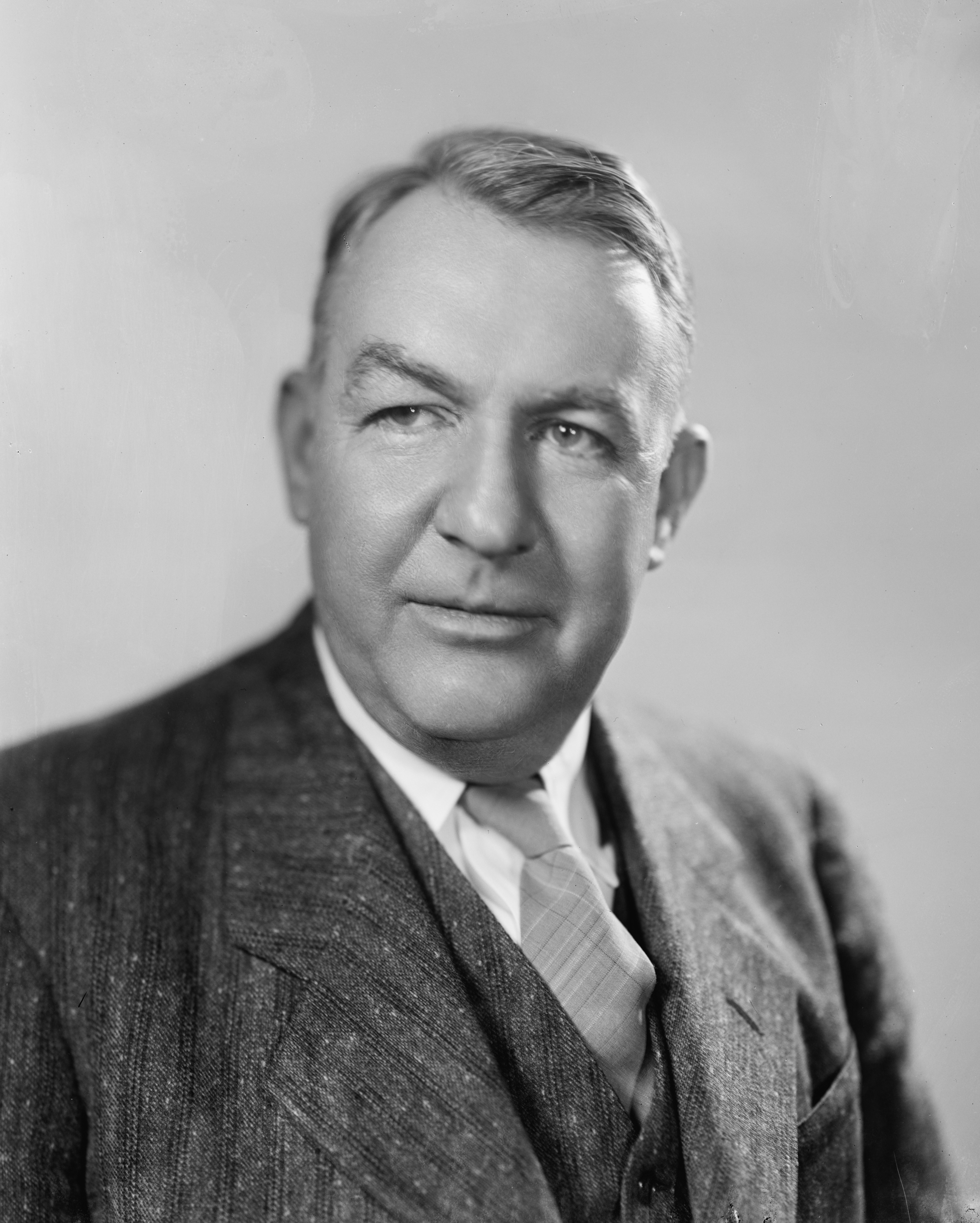

Nominee	Sam Ervin	Joel A. Johnson
Party	Democratic	Republican
Popular vote	731,353	367,475
Percentage	66.56%	33.44%
- County results Ervin: 50–60% 60–70% 70–80% 80–90% >90% Johnson: 50–60% 60–70% 70–80%
Senator before election
Sam Ervin
Democratic
Elected Senator
Sam Ervin
Democratic

1956 United States Senate election in North Carolina
Party	Candidate	Votes	%
Democratic	Samuel J. Ervin Jr. (incumbent)	731,433	66.56
Republican	Joel A. Johnson	367,475	33.44
Majority		363,958	33.12
Turnout		1,098,908	
Democratic hold			

== North Dakota ==
1956 United States Senate election in North Dakota
- November 6, 1956
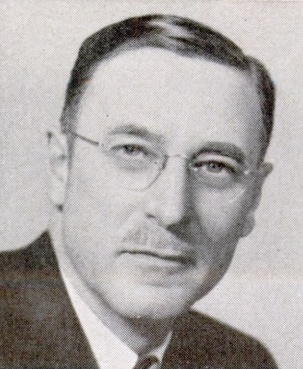

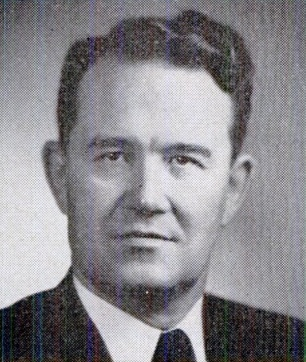
Nominee	Milton Young	Quentin Burdick
Party	Republican	Democratic–NPL
Popular vote	155,305	87,919
Percentage	63.61%	36.01%
- County results Young: 40–50% 50–60% 60–70% 70–80% 80–90%
U.S. senator before election
Milton Young
Republican
Elected U.S. Senator
Milton Young
Republican

In North Dakota, the incumbent, Republican Milton Young, sought and received re-election to his third term, defeating North Dakota Democratic-NPL Party candidate Quentin N. Burdick, son of North Dakota Congressman Usher L. Burdick.

Only Young filed as a Republican, and the endorsed Democratic candidate was Quentin Burdick, the son of well-known politician Usher Burdick, and former candidate for governor of North Dakota. Young and Burdick won the primary elections for their respective parties.

One independent candidate, Arthur C. Townley, also filed before the deadline. Townley would later seek the state's other senate seat in 1958, and was known for creating the National Non-Partisan League.

1956 United States Senate election in North Dakota
Party	Candidate	Votes	%
Republican	Milton R. Young (incumbent)	155,305	63.61
Democratic–NPL	Quentin N. Burdick	87,919	36.01
Independent	Arthur C. Townley	937	0.38
Majority		67,386	27.60
Turnout		244,161	
Republican hold			

== Ohio ==
1956 United States Senate election in Ohio
- November 6, 1956
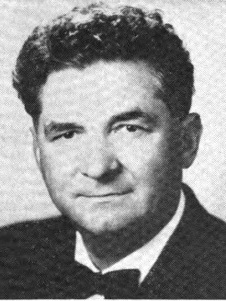

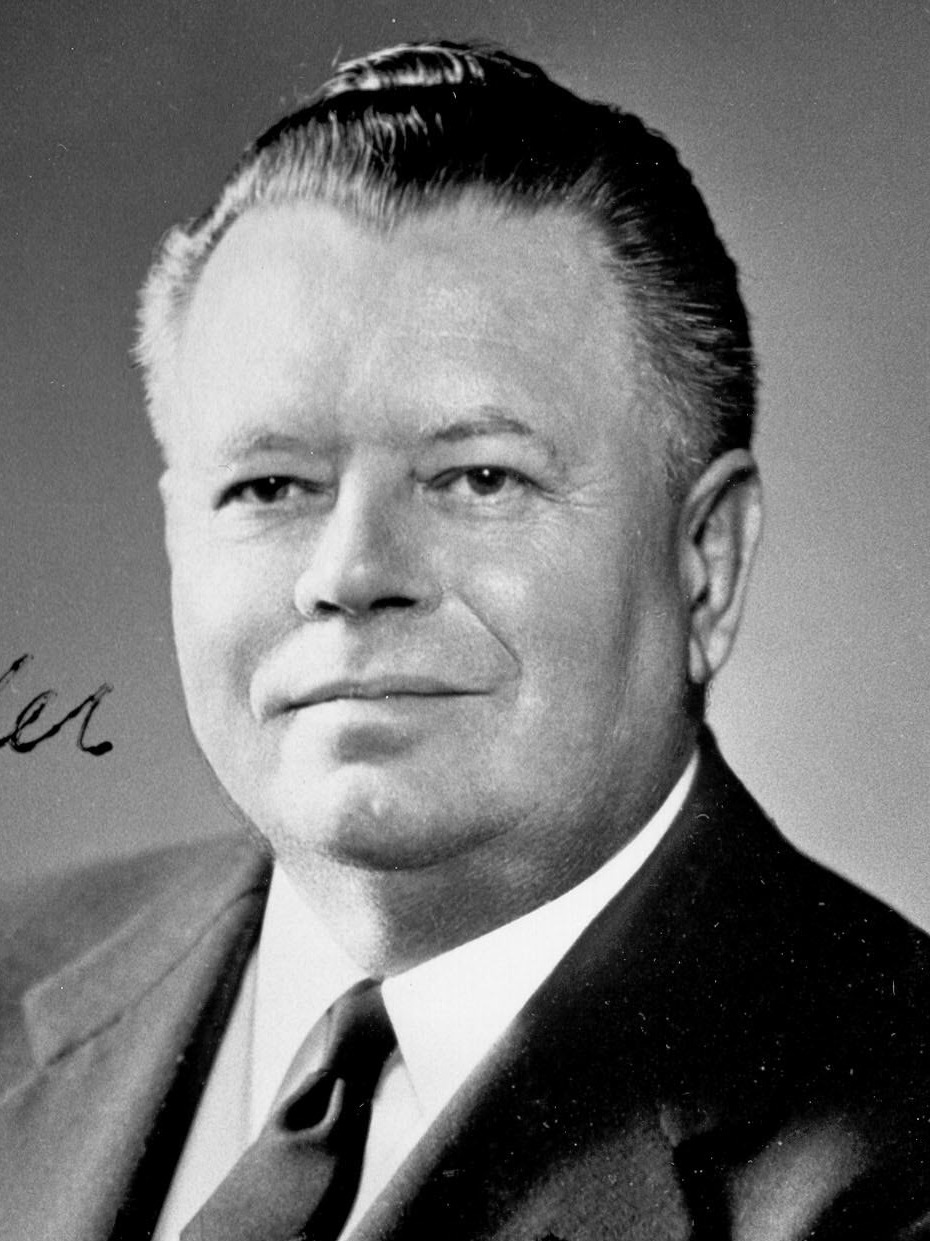
Nominee	Frank Lausche	George H. Bender
Party	Democratic	Republican
Popular vote	1,864,589	1,660,910
Percentage	52.89%	47.11%
- County results Lausche: 50–60% 60–70% Bender: 50–60% 60–70%
U.S. senator before election
George H. Bender
Republican
Elected U.S. Senator
Frank J. Lausche
Democratic

1956 United States Senate election in Ohio
Party	Candidate	Votes	%
Democratic	Frank J. Lausche	1,864,589	52.89
Republican	George H. Bender (incumbent)	1,660,910	47.11
Majority		203,679	5.78
Turnout		3,525,499	
Democratic gain from Republican			

== Oklahoma ==
1956 United States Senate election in Oklahoma
- November 6, 1956
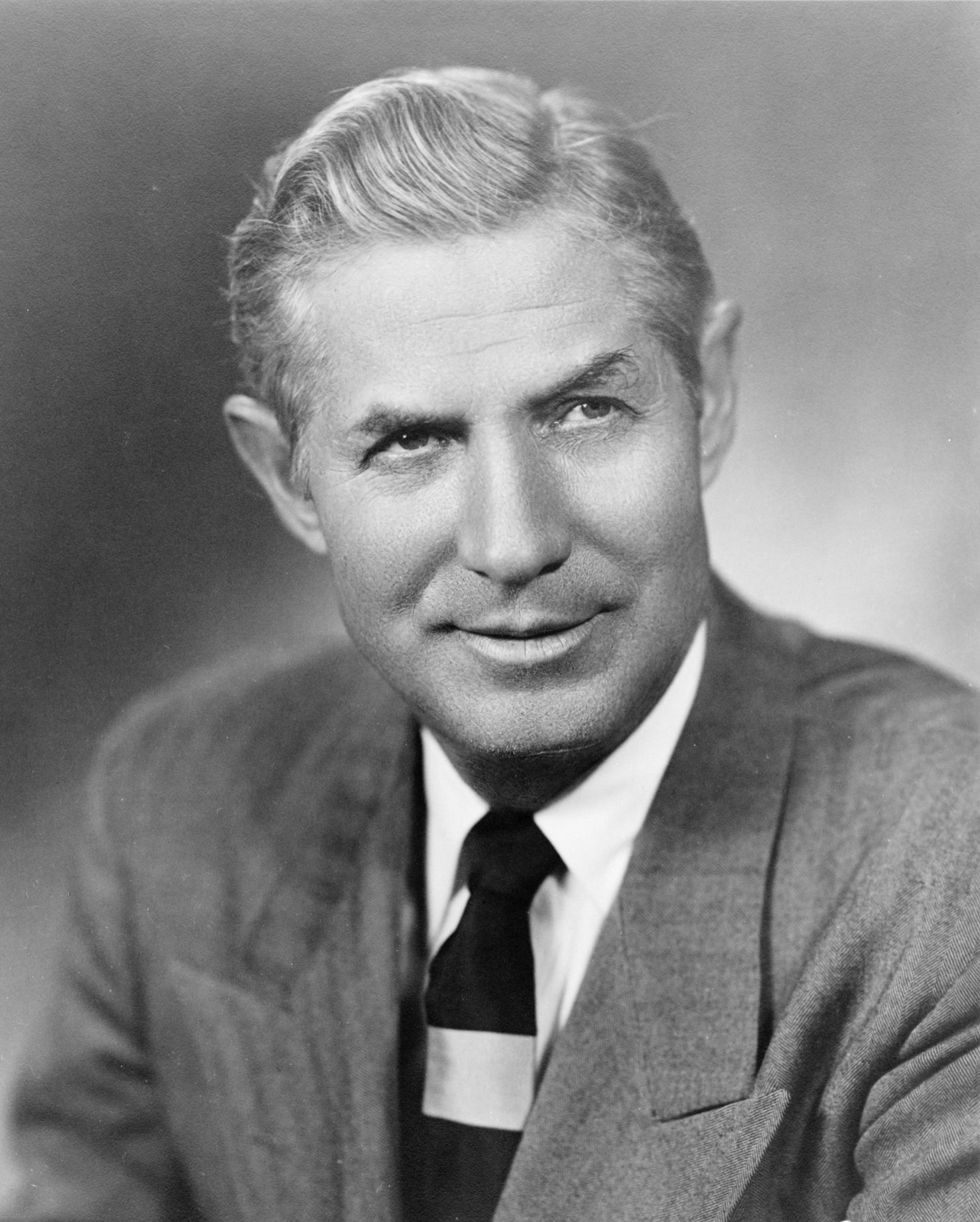

Nominee	Mike Monroney	Douglas McKeever
Party	Democratic	Republican
Popular vote	459,996	371,146
Percentage	55.35%	44.65%
- County results Monroney: 50–60% 60–70% 70–80% 80–90% McKeever: 50–60% 60–70%
U.S. senator before election
Mike Monroney
Democratic
Elected U.S. Senator
Mike Monroney
Democratic

1956 United States Senate election in Oklahoma
Party	Candidate	Votes	%
Democratic	Mike Monroney (incumbent)	459,996	55.35
Republican	Douglas McKeever	371,146	44.65
Majority		88,850	10.70
Turnout		831,142	
Democratic hold			

== Oregon ==
1956 United States Senate election in Oregon
- November 7, 1956
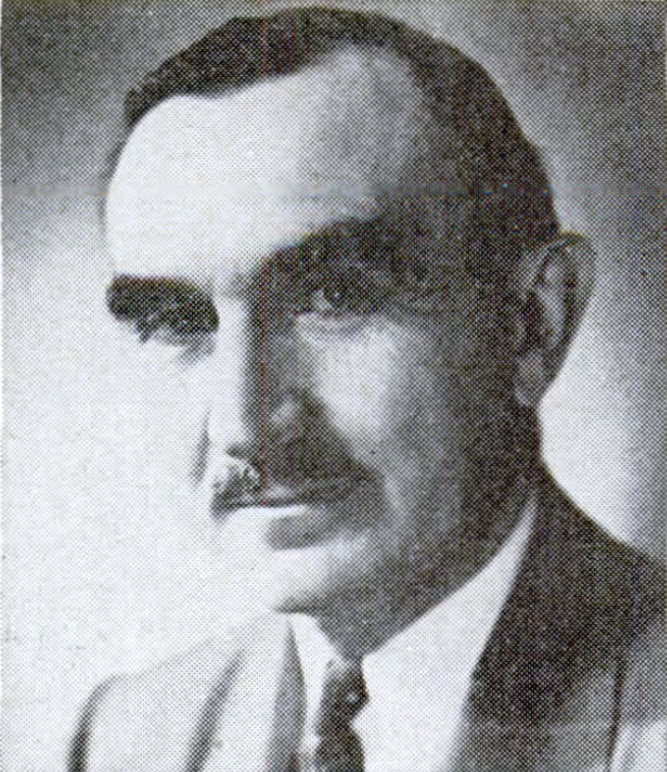

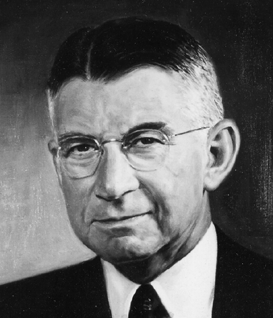
Nominee	Wayne Morse	Douglas McKay
Party	Democratic	Republican
Popular vote	396,849	335,405
Percentage	54.20%	45.80%
- County results Morse: 50–60% 60–70% McKay: 50-60%
Senator before election
Wayne Morse
Democratic
Elected Senator
Wayne Morse
Democratic

In Oregon, Republican-turned-Independent-turned-Democrat Wayne Morse decided to seek re-election for his first full term as a Democrat. Morse defeated Republican candidate Douglas McKay in the hotly contested general election.

1956 Oregon United States Senate election
Party	Candidate	Votes	%
Democratic	Wayne Morse, incumbent senator since 1945; Democratic party since 1955	396,849	54.20
Republican	Douglas McKay, former governor of Oregon (1949–1952) and United States secretary of the interior (1953–1956)	335,405	45.80
Majority		61,444	8.39
Turnout		732,254	
Democratic hold			

== Pennsylvania ==
1956 United States Senate election in Pennsylvania
- November 6, 1956
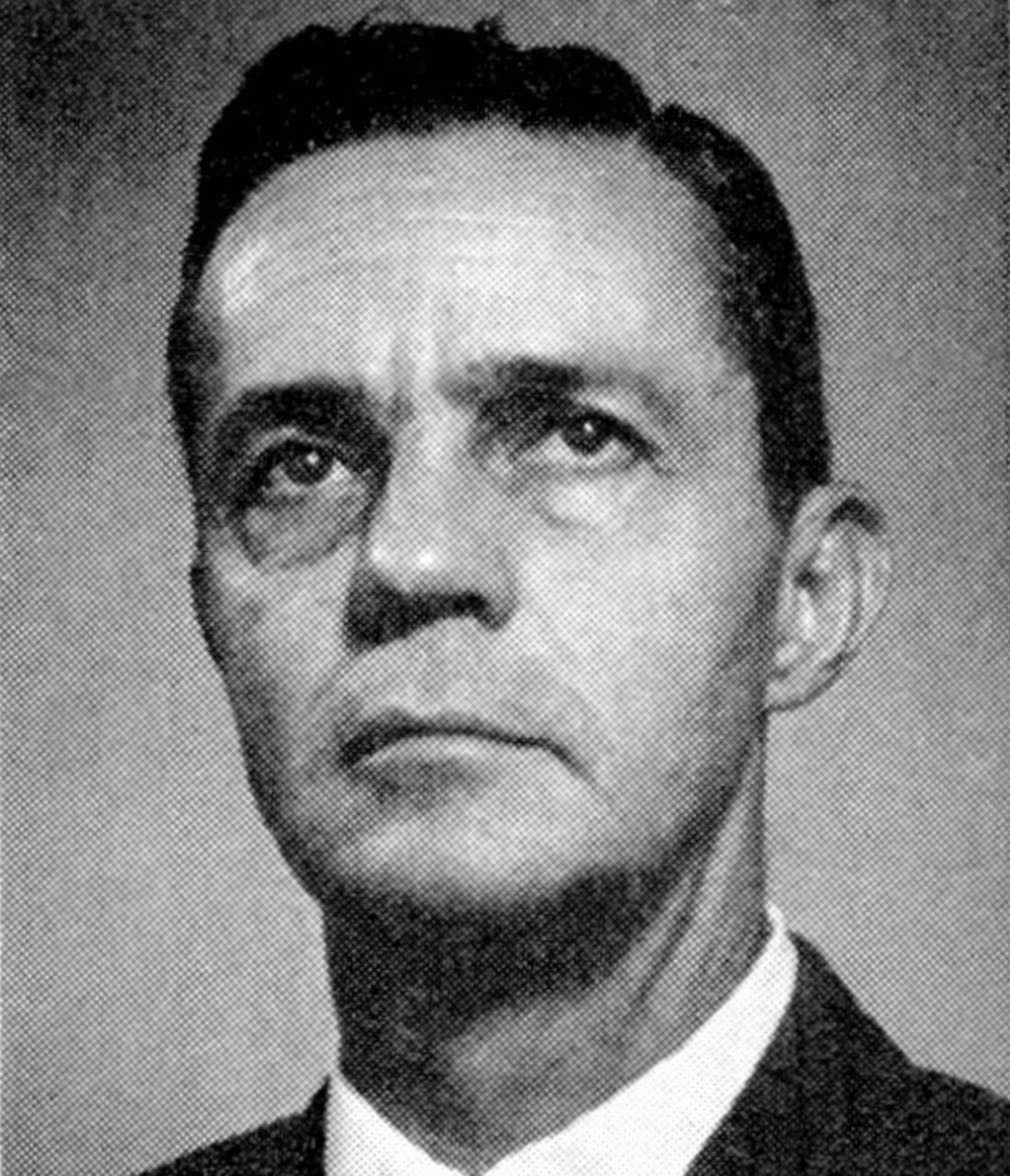

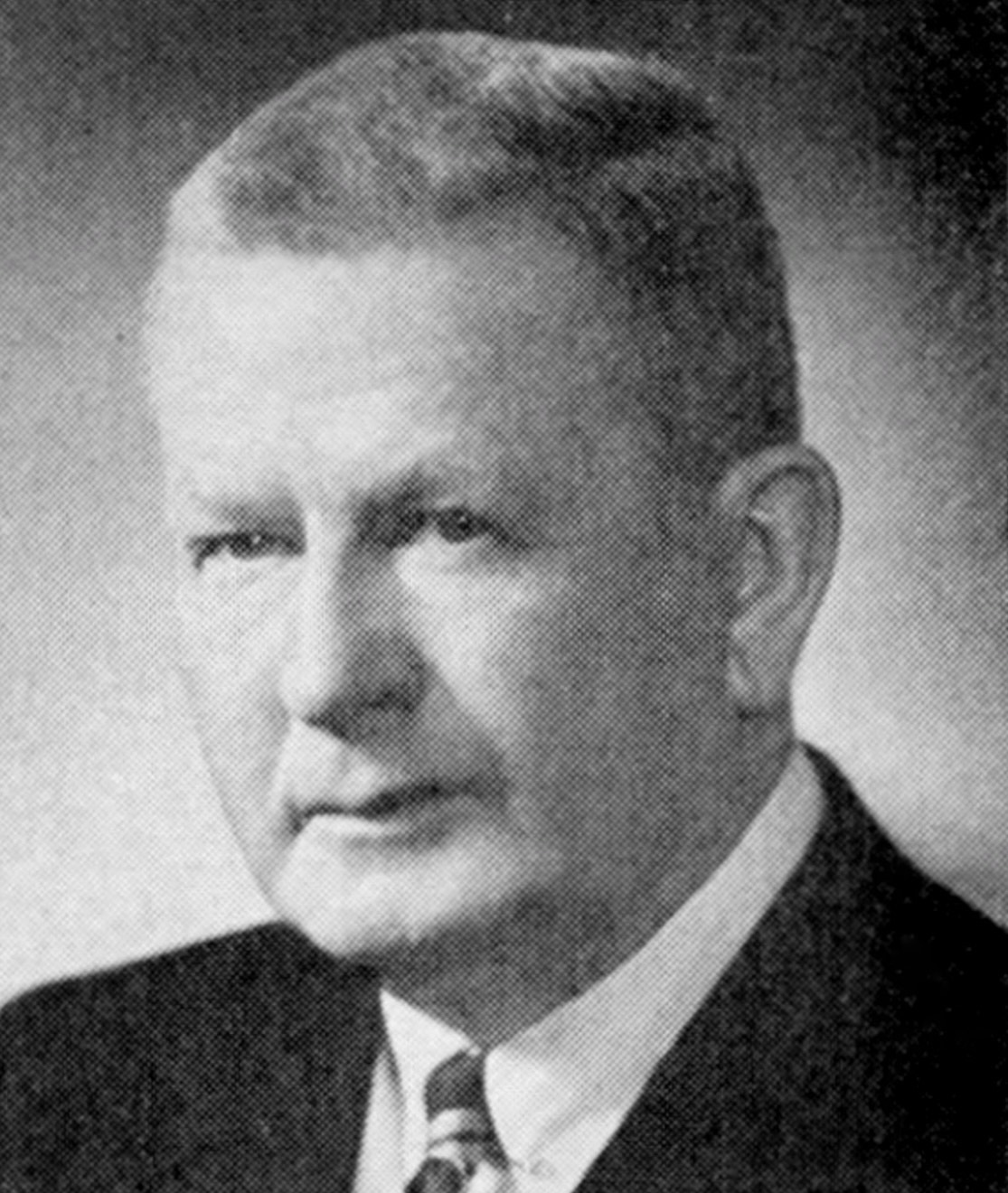
Nominee	Joseph S. Clark Jr.	James H. Duff
Party	Democratic	Republican
Popular vote	2,268,641	2,250,671
Percentage	50.08%	49.69%
- County results Clark Jr.: 50–60% 60–70% Duff: 40–50% 50–60% 60–70% 70–80%
U.S. senator before election
James H. Duff
Republican
Elected U.S. Senator
Joseph S. Clark Jr.
Democratic

In Pennsylvania, incumbent Republican U.S. Senator James H. Duff sought re-election to another term, but was defeated by the Democratic nominee, Joseph S. Clark Jr.

General election results
Party	Candidate	Votes	%
Democratic	Joseph S. Clark Jr., former mayor of Philadelphia	2,268,641	50.08
Republican	James H. Duff, incumbent U.S. senator	2,250,671	49.69
Socialist Labor	George S. Taylor	7,447	0.16
Militant Workers	Herbert G. Lewin	2,035	0.05
Majority		17,970	0.39
Turnout		4,529,874	
Democratic gain from Republican			

== South Carolina ==
In South Carolina the regular election was held simultaneously with the special election.

=== South Carolina (regular) ===
1956 United States Senate election in South Carolina
- November 6, 1956
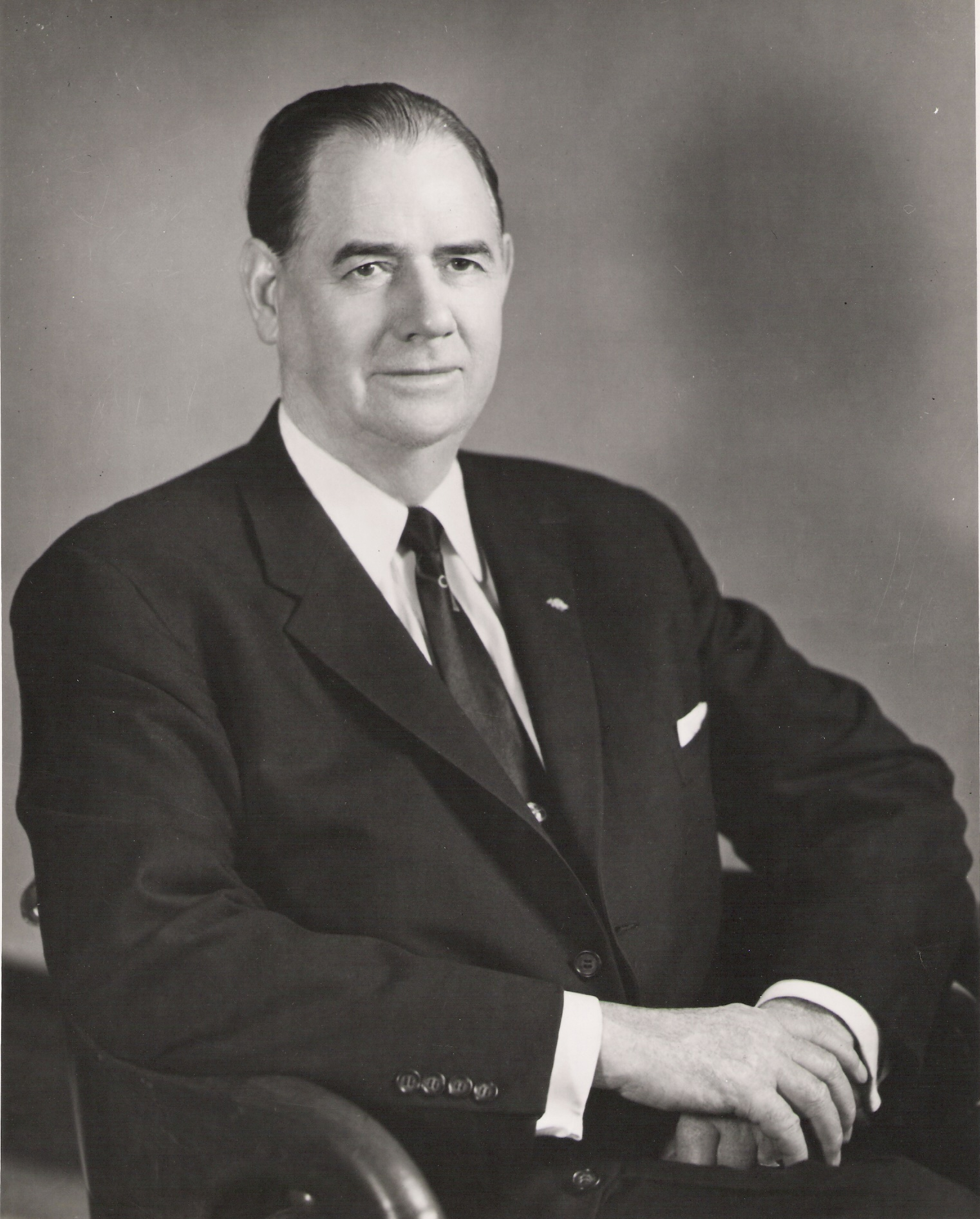

Nominee	Olin D. Johnston	Leon P. Crawford
Party	Democratic	Republican
Popular vote	230,150	49,695
Percentage	82.21%	17.75%
- County results Johnston: 50–60% 60–70% 70–80% 80–90% >90%
U.S. senator before election
Olin D. Johnston
Democratic
Elected U.S. Senator
Olin D. Johnston
Democratic

Incumbent Democrat Olin D. Johnston handily defeated Republican mayor of Clemson Leon P. Crawford. Olin D. Johnston, the incumbent senator, faced no opposition from South Carolina Democrats and avoided a primary election. Leon P. Crawford, the mayor of the town of Clemson in the Upstate, faced no opposition from South Carolina Republicans and avoided a primary election. Crawford campaigned as a defender of states' rights and denounced Johnston for backing the New Deal and the Fair Deal. The state Republican Party believed that Crawford could have a chance in the election if he galvanized the 128,000 registered Black voters, although they were weary of being labeled as the Black party. In the end, Johnston remained highly popular with the voters who were still leery of the Republican party, and he easily defeated Crawford in the general election.

South Carolina U.S. Senate election, 1956
Party	Candidate	Votes	%	±%
Democratic	Olin D. Johnston (incumbent)	230,150	82.21	−17.69%
Republican	Leon P. Crawford	49,695	17.75	+17.75%
Write-in	Write-Ins	124	0.04	−0.1%
Majority		180,455	64.46	−35.34%
Turnout		279,969	36.8	
Democratic hold		Swing		

=== South Carolina (special) ===
1956 United States Senate special election in South Carolina
- November 6, 1956
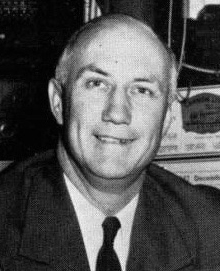
Nominee	Strom Thurmond
Party	Democratic
Popular vote	245,371
Percentage	100.00%
- County results Thurmond: 90-100%
U.S. senator before election
Thomas A. Wofford
Democratic
Elected U.S. Senator
Strom Thurmond
Democratic

The special election resulted from the resignation of Senator Strom Thurmond on April 4, 1956, who was keeping a campaign pledge he had made in the 1954 election. Thurmond was unopposed in his bid to complete the remaining four years of the term. Senator Strom Thurmond faced no opposition from South Carolina Democrats and avoided a primary election. There was a possibility that Governor George Bell Timmerman Jr. might enter the race, but Thurmond was held in such high regard by the voters that there would have been no chance of defeating Thurmond. With no challenge to the remainder of the term, Thurmond did not conduct a campaign, and rejoined his old law firm in Aiken until he returned to the Senate after the general election.

South Carolina U.S. Senate special election, 1956
Party	Candidate	Votes	%	±%
Democratic	Strom Thurmond	245,371	100.0	+36.9%
Majority		245,371	100.0	+73.7%
Turnout		245,371	32.2	+5.9%
Democratic hold		Swing		

== South Dakota ==
1956 United States Senate election in South Dakota
- November 6, 1956
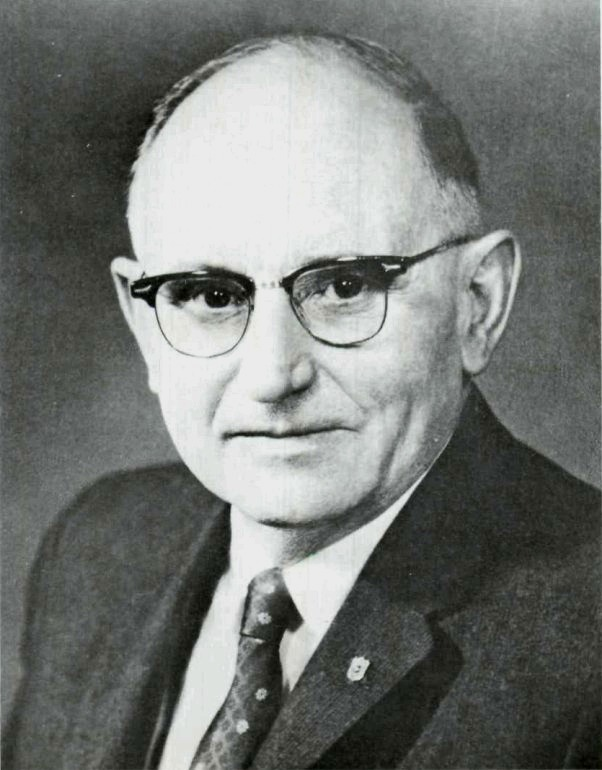

Nominee	Francis H. Case	Kenneth Holum
Party	Republican	Democratic
Popular vote	147,621	143,001
Percentage	50.79%	49.21%
- County results Case: 50–60% 60–70% 70–80% Holum: 50–60% 60–70%
U.S. senator before election
Francis H. Case
Republican
Elected U.S. Senator
Francis H. Case
Republican

1956 United States Senate election in South Dakota
Party	Candidate	Votes	%
Republican	Francis Case (incumbent)	147,621	50.79
Democratic	Kenneth Holum	143,001	49.21
Majority		4,620	1.58
Turnout		290,622	
Republican hold			

== Utah ==
1956 United States Senate election in Utah
- November 6, 1956
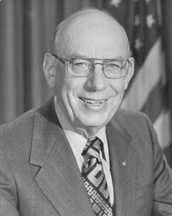

Nominee	Wallace F. Bennett	Alonzo F. Hopkin
Party	Republican	Democratic
Popular vote	178,261	152,120
Percentage	53.96%	46.04%
- County results Bennett: 50–60% 60–70% 70–80% Hopkin: 50–60% 60–70% 80–90%
U.S. senator before election
Wallace F. Bennett
Republican
Elected U.S. Senator
Wallace F. Bennett
Republican

1956 United States Senate election in Utah
Party	Candidate	Votes	%
Republican	Wallace F. Bennett (incumbent)	178,261	53.96
Democratic	Alonzo F. Hopkin	152,120	46.04
Majority		26,141	7.92
Turnout		330,381	
Republican hold			

== Vermont ==
1956 United States Senate election in Vermont
- November 6, 1956
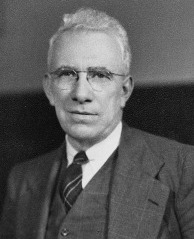

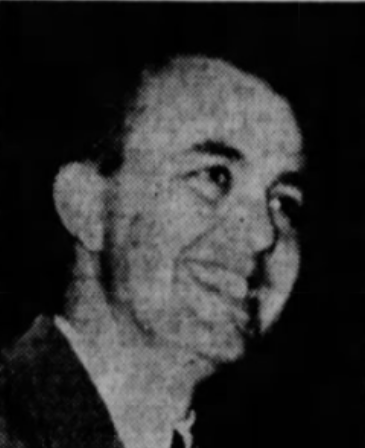
Nominee	George Aiken	Bernard O'Shea
Party	Republican	Democratic
Popular vote	103,101	52,184
Percentage	66.39%	33.61%
- Aiken: 50-60% 60-70% 70-80% 80-90% 90-100% O'Shea: 50-60% 60-70% 70-80%
U.S. senator before election
George Aiken
Republican
Elected U.S. Senator
George Aiken
Republican

In Vermont, incumbent Republican George Aiken ran successfully for re-election to another term in the United States Senate, defeating Democratic challenger Bernard G. O'Shea.

Republican primary results
Party	Candidate	Votes	%
Republican	George Aiken (incumbent)	49,454	99.9
Republican	Other	27	0.1
Total votes		49,481	100

Democratic primary results
Party	Candidate	Votes	%
Democratic	Bernard G. O'Shea	7,997	99.8
Democratic	Other	19	0.2
Total votes		801	100

1956 United States Senate election in Vermont
Party	Candidate	Votes	%
Republican	George Aiken (incumbent)	103,101	66.39
Democratic	Bernard G. O'Shea	52,184	33.60
None	Scattering	4	0.00
Majority		50,917	32.79
Turnout		155,289	
Republican hold			

== Washington ==
1956 United States Senate election in Washington
- November 6, 1956
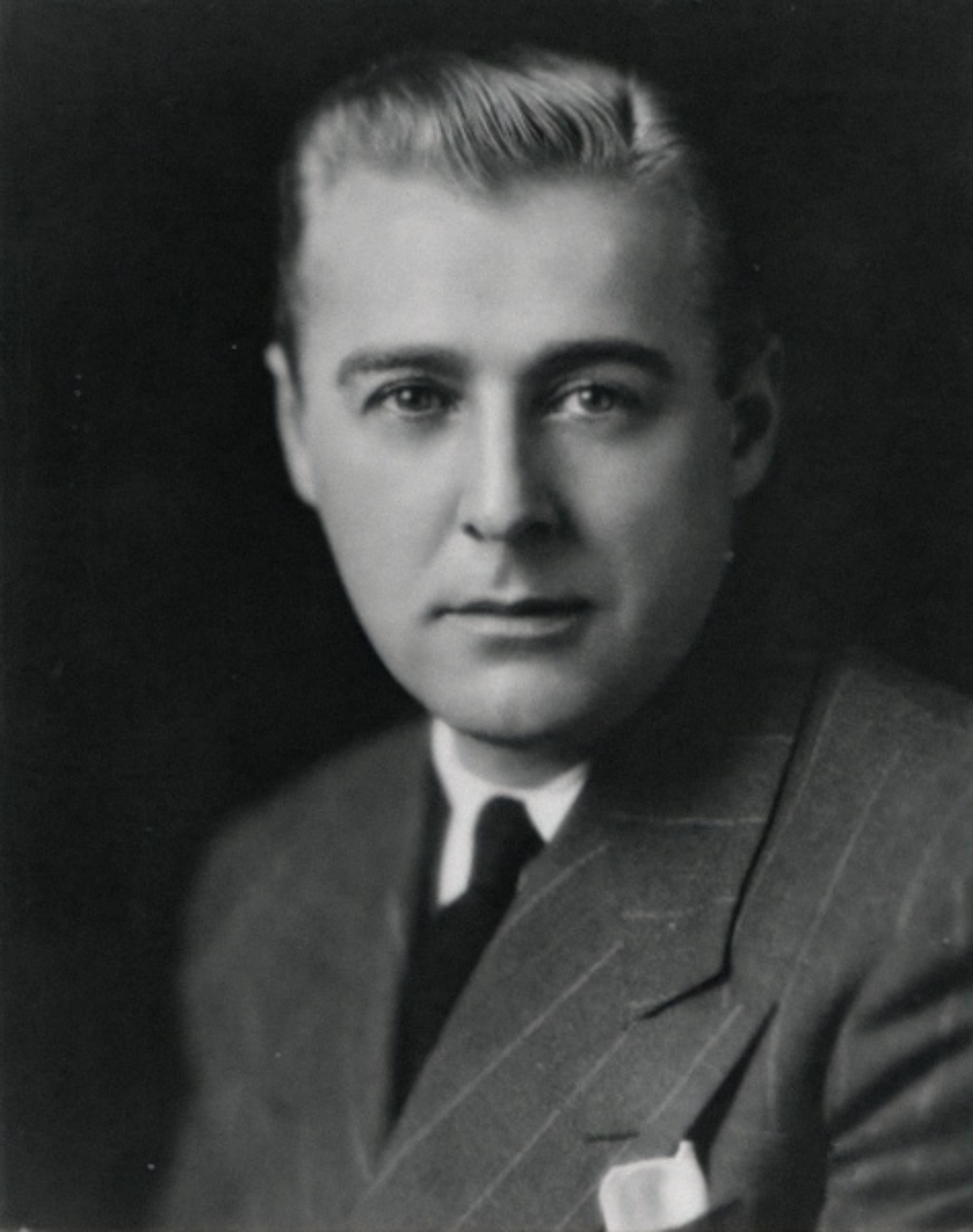

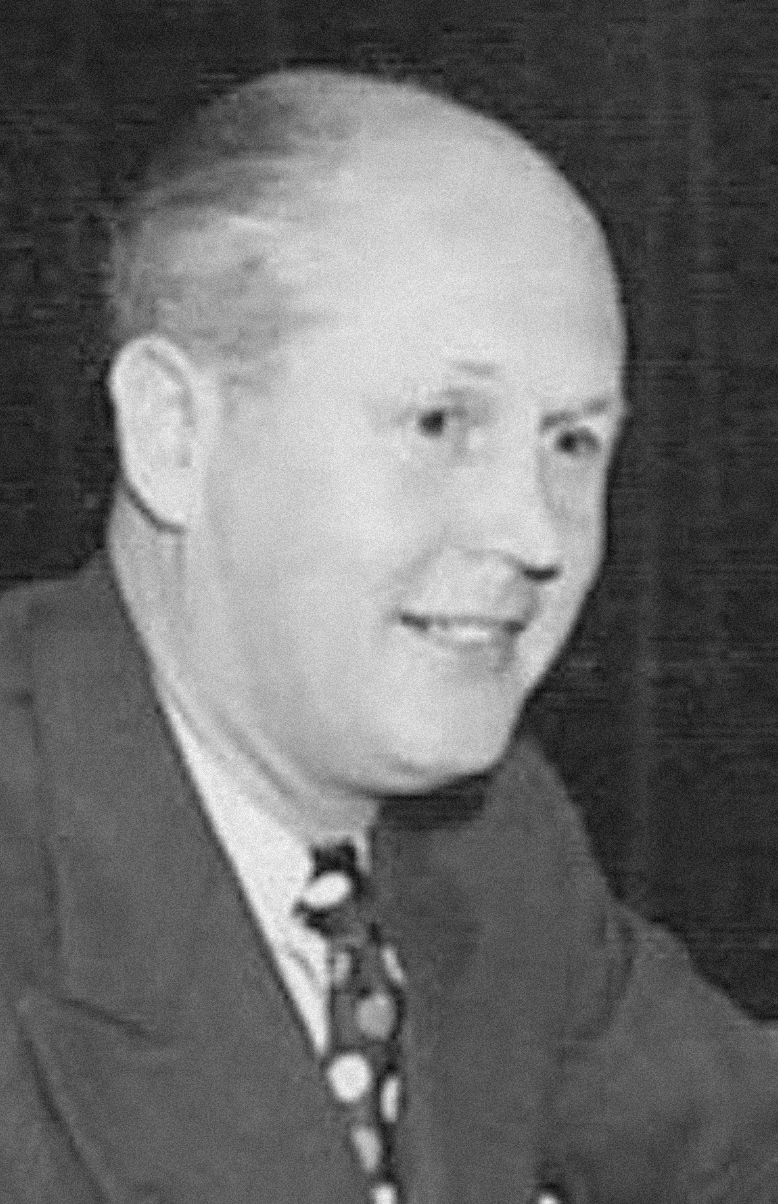
Nominee	Warren Magnuson	Arthur B. Langlie
Party	Democratic	Republican
Popular vote	685,565	436,652
Percentage	61.09%	38.91%
- County results Magnuson: 50–60% 60–70% 70–80%
U.S. senator before election
Warren Magnuson
Democratic
Elected U.S. Senator
Warren Magnuson
Democratic

1956 United States Senate election in Washington
Party	Candidate	Votes	%
Democratic	Warren G. Magnuson (incumbent)	685,565	61.09
Republican	Arthur B. Langlie	436,652	38.91
Majority		248,913	22.18
Turnout		1,122,217	
Democratic hold			

== West Virginia (special) ==
1956 United States Senate special election in West Virginia
- November 6, 1956
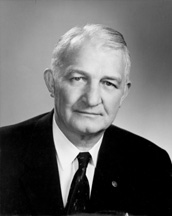

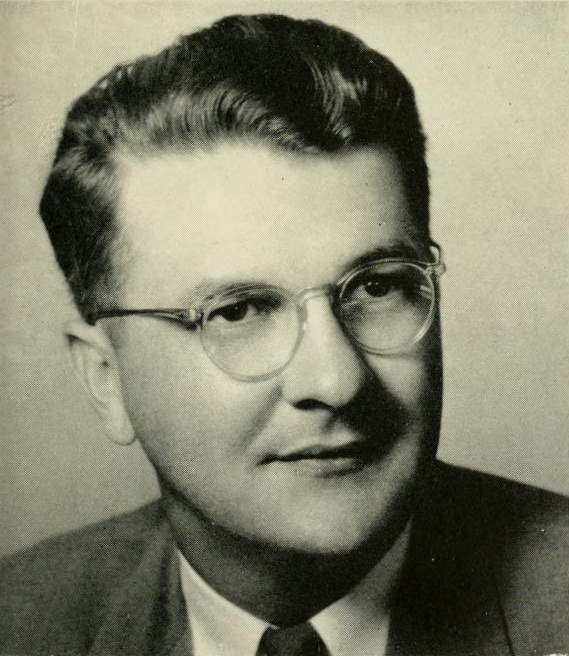
Nominee	Chapman Revercomb	William C. Marland
Party	Republican	Democratic
Popular vote	432,123	373,051
Percentage	53.67%	46.33%
- County results Revercomb: 50–60% 60–70% 70–80% 80–90% Marland: 50–60% 60–70%
U.S. senator before election
William Laird III
Democratic
Elected U.S. Senator
Chapman Revercomb
Republican

Following the death of Harley M. Kilgore on February 28, 1956, William Laird III was appointed to fill this seat and assumed office on March 13, 1956. Laird did not opt to run in the special election to fill the remainder of Kilgore's term through the end of the 85th Congress on January 3, 1959. This was the last time until 2014 that the Republicans won a U.S. Senate election in the state, and the last time until 2024 that they won the Class I seat.

1956 United States Senate election in West Virginia
Party	Candidate	Votes	%
Republican	William Chapman Revercomb	432,123	53.67
Democratic	William C. Marland	373,051	46.33
Majority		59,072	7.34
Turnout		805,174	
Republican gain from Democratic			

== Wisconsin ==
1956 United States Senate election in Wisconsin
- November 6, 1956
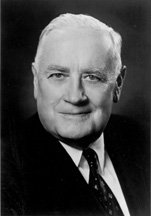

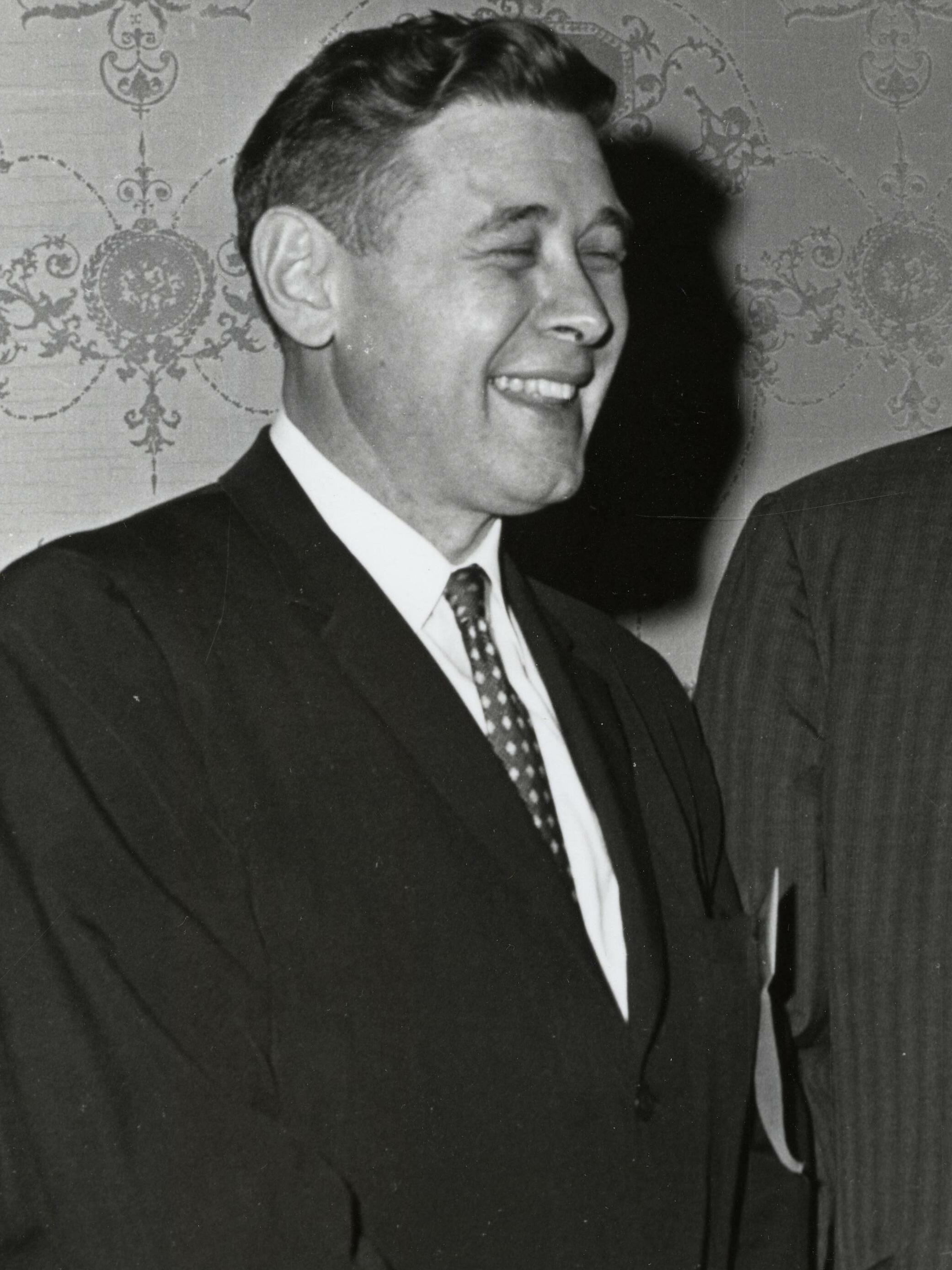
Nominee	Alexander Wiley	Henry Maier
Party	Republican	Democratic
Popular vote	892,473	627,903
Percentage	58.59%	41.22%
- County results Wiley: 50–60% 60–70% 70–80% Maier: 50–60%
U.S. senator before election
Alexander Wiley
Republican
Elected U.S. Senator
Alexander Wiley
Republican

Incumbent Republican Senator Alexander Wiley easily won reelection to a fourth and final term, defeating the Democratic candidate, Henry W. Maier, by a margin of 17.4%. This would be the last time a Republican would win a Senate race in Wisconsin until Bob Kasten in 1980, and the last time a Republican would win more than two terms until Ron Johnson's victory in 2022.

1956 United States Senate election in Wisconsin
Party	Candidate	Votes	%
Republican	Alexander Wiley (incumbent)	892,473	58.59
Democratic	Henry W. Maier	627,903	41.22
Independent	Walter Semrau	2,745	0.18
None	Scattering	235	0.02
Majority		264,570	17.37
Turnout		1,523,356	
Republican hold			

== See also ==
- 1956 United States elections
  - 1956 United States presidential election
  - 1956 United States House of Representatives elections
  - 1956 United States gubernatorial elections
- 84th United States Congress
- 85th United States Congress

== Sources ==
- 1956 U.S. Senate Election results
- Warren Weaver Jr (December 11, 1956). "STATE ELECTORS TO VOTE MONDAY; But Harriman Will Not Hold Reception for Republicans --Final Tally Listed Dewey Held Receptions 4.3 Million for Eisenhower". The New York Times. ISSN 0362-4331.
- Supplemental Report of the Secretary of State to the General Assembly of South Carolina. Reports and Resolutions of South Carolina to the General Assembly of the State of South Carolina. Vol. I. Columbia, South Carolina. 1957. pp. 8–9.
- Kalk, Bruce H. (2001). The Origins of the Southern Strategy: Two-Party Competition in South. Lexington Books. pp. 30, 33.
- Bass, Jack; Thompson, Marilyn W. (1998). Ol' Strom: An Unauthorized Biography of Strom Thurmond. Longstreet. p. 155.
