= 1958 United States Senate elections =

- November 4, 1958 (Note: Maine election held on September 8, 1958; Alaska elections held on November 25, 1958.)
- Class 1

36 of the 98 seats in the United States Senate 50 seats needed for a majority
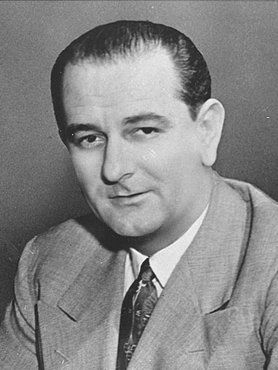

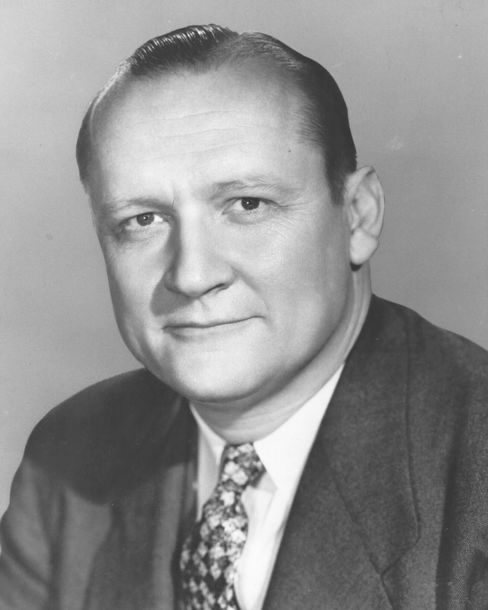
	Majority party	Minority party
Leader	Lyndon Johnson	William Knowland (retired)
Party	Democratic	Republican
Leader since	January 3, 1953	August 4, 1953
Leader's seat	Texas	California
Seats before	49	47
Seats after	64	34
Seat change	▲15	▼13
Popular vote	21,426,124 (Note: The Liberal Party in New York endorsed Frank Hogan, a Democrat, but the Clerk of the U.S. House of Representatives did not tabulate their votes, totaling 275,051, into the national Democratic total.)	16,622,338
Percentage	55.3%	42.9%
Seats up	13	21
Races won	28	8
- Results of the elections: Democratic gain Democratic hold Republican hold No election Rectangular inset (Alaska and W. V.): both seats up for election
Majority Leader before election
Lyndon Johnson
Democratic
Elected Majority Leader
Lyndon Johnson
Democratic

The 1958 United States Senate elections were elections for the United States Senate which occurred in the middle of President Dwight D. Eisenhower's second term. Thirty-two seats of Class 1 were contested in regular elections, the new state of Alaska held its first Senate elections for its Class 2 and 3 seats, and two special elections were held to fill vacancies.

As is common in midterm elections, the party in the White House lost seats, but losses this year were heavy due to the Recession of 1958, the Eisenhower Administration's position on right-to-work issues that galvanized the labor unions which supported Democrats, and the launch of Sputnik. This was the first time since 1934 that Democrats gained seats in this class of senators. Democrats won both seats in West Virginia, marking the last time Democrats would simultaneously flip both of a state's Senate seats until Georgia's elections in 2020 and 2021.

The Democratic Party gained a record 15 seats in this election, defeating 10 Republican incumbents, gaining three open Republican seats, and winning both seats from the new state of Alaska. This gave the Democrats a strong Senate majority of 64–34 over the Republicans, and the largest swing in the history of the Senate. After the new state of Hawaii elected its first senators in 1959, the Senate's balance changed to 65–35.

This is only one of two occasions in U.S. history that 10 or more Senate seats changed hands in a mid-term election (the other being in 1946), and also one of five occasions where 10 or more Senate seats changed hands in an election, with the other occasions being in 1920, 1932, 1946, and 1980.

== Results summary ==
↓
64	34
Democratic	Republican

For the November 5 and 25, 1958 regular and special elections.

Colored shading indicates party with largest share of that row.

Parties				Total
Parties	Democratic	Republican	Other	Total
Last elections (1956) Before these elections	49	47	0	96
Not up	36	26	0	62
Class 2 (1954)	19	11	0	30
Class 3 (1956)	17	15	0	32
Up	13	21	—	34
Class 1 (1952→1958)	12	20	—	32
Special: Class 2	1	1	—	2
Incumbent retired	0	6	—	6
Held by same party	0	3	—	3
Replaced by other party	▼3 Republicans replaced by ▲3 Democrats		—	3
Result	3	3	0	6
Incumbent ran	13	15	—	28
Won re-election	13	5	—	18
Lost re-election	▼10 Republicans replaced by ▲10 Democrats		—	10
Lost renomination, but held by same party	0	0	—	0
Result	23	5	0	28
New state	2	0	0	2
Total elected	28	8	0	36
Net gain/loss	▲15	▼13	Steady	15
Nationwide vote	21,426,124	16,622,338	678,147	38,726,609
Share	55.33%	42.92%	1.75%	100%
Result	64	34	0	98

Source: Clerk of the U.S. House of Representatives

== Gains, losses, and holds ==
=== Retirements ===
Six Republicans retired instead of seeking re-election.

State	Senator	Replaced by
California	William Knowland	Clair Engle
Indiana	William E. Jenner	Vance Hartke
New Jersey	H. Alexander Smith	Harrison A. Williams
New York	Irving Ives	Kenneth Keating
Pennsylvania	Edward Martin	Hugh Scott
Vermont	Ralph Flanders	Winston L. Prouty

=== Defeats ===
Ten Republicans sought re-election but lost in the general election.

State	Senator	Replaced by
Connecticut	William A. Purtell	Thomas J. Dodd
Maine	Frederick G. Payne	Edmund Muskie
Michigan	Charles E. Potter	Philip Hart
Minnesota	Edward J. Thye	Eugene McCarthy
Nevada	George W. Malone	Howard Cannon
Ohio	John W. Bricker	Stephen M. Young
Utah	Arthur V. Watkins	Frank Moss
West Virginia (regular)	Chapman Revercomb	Robert Byrd
West Virginia (special)	John D. Hoblitzell Jr.	Jennings Randolph
Wyoming	Frank A. Barrett	Gale W. McGee

=== New states ===
Alaska was admitted into the Union and elected two Democrats to the Senate.

State	Senator
Alaska (class 2)	Bob Bartlett
Alaska (class 3)	Ernest Gruening

=== Post-election states ===
Hawaii was admitted into the Union and elected one Democrat and one Republican to the Senate on July 28, 1959.

State	Senator
Hawaii (class 1)	Hiram Fong
Hawaii (class 3)	Oren E. Long

=== Post election changes ===
Two Democrats left the Senate after the election. Both seats were filled by Democrats.

State	Senator	Replaced by
Oregon	Richard L. Neuberger	Hall S. Lusk
Missouri	Thomas C. Hennings Jr.	Edward V. Long

== Change in composition ==
=== Before the elections ===
	D_{1}	D_{2}	D_{3}	D_{4}	D_{5}	D_{6}	D_{7}	D_{8}	D_{9}
D_{19}	D_{18}	D_{17}	D_{16}	D_{15}	D_{14}	D_{13}	D_{12}	D_{11}	D_{10}
D_{20}	D_{21}	D_{22}	D_{23}	D_{24}	D_{25}	D_{27}	D_{26}	D_{28}	D_{29}
D_{39} Miss. Ran	D_{38} Mass. Ran	D_{37} Fla. Ran	D_{36}	D_{35}	D_{34}	D_{33}	D_{32}	D_{31}	D_{30}
D_{40} Mo. Ran	D_{41} Mont. Ran	D_{42} N.M. Ran	D_{43} N.C. (sp); Ran	D_{44} R.I. Ran	D_{45} Tenn. Ran	D_{46} Texas; Ran	D_{47} Va. Ran	D_{48} Wash. Ran	D_{49} Wis. Ran
Majority ↑									TBD_{1} Ak. (cl. 3); New state
R_{40} N.D. Ran	R_{41} Ohio; Ran	R_{42} Pa. Retired	R_{43} Utah; Ran	R_{44} Vt. Retired	R_{45} W.Va. (reg); Ran	R_{46} W.Va. (sp); Ran	R_{47} Wyo. Ran	TBD_{2} Ak. (cl. 2); New state	TBD_{1} Ak. (cl. 3); New state
R_{39} N.Y. Retired	R_{38} N.J. Retired	R_{37} Nev. Ran	R_{36} Neb. Ran	R_{35} Minn. Ran	R_{34} Mich. Ran	R_{33} Md. Ran	R_{32} Maine; Ran	R_{31} Ind. Retired	R_{30} Del. Ran
R_{20}	R_{21}	R_{22}	R_{23}	R_{24}	R_{25}	R_{26}	R_{27} Ariz. Ran	R_{28} Calif. Retired	R_{29} Conn. Ran
R_{19}	R_{18}	R_{17}	R_{16}	R_{15}	R_{14}	R_{13}	R_{12}	R_{11}	R_{10}
	R_{1}	R_{2}	R_{3}	R_{4}	R_{5}	R_{6}	R_{7}	R_{8}	R_{9}

=== After the elections ===
	D_{1}	D_{2}	D_{3}	D_{4}	D_{5}	D_{6}	D_{7}	D_{8}	D_{9}
D_{19}	D_{18}	D_{17}	D_{16}	D_{15}	D_{14}	D_{13}	D_{12}	D_{11}	D_{10}
D_{20}	D_{21}	D_{22}	D_{23}	D_{24}	D_{25}	D_{26}	D_{27}	D_{28}	D_{29}
D_{39} Miss. Re-elected	D_{38} Mass. Re-elected	D_{37} Fla. Re-elected	D_{36}	D_{35}	D_{34}	D_{33}	D_{32}	D_{31}	D_{30}
D_{40} Mo. Re-elected	D_{41} Mont. Re-elected	D_{42} N.M. Re-elected	D_{43} N.C. (sp); Elected (Note: Appointee elected)	D_{44} R.I. Re-elected	D_{45} Tenn. Re-elected	D_{46} Texas; Re-elected	D_{47} Va. Re-elected	D_{48} Wash. Re-elected	D_{49} Wis. Re-elected
Majority →									D_{50} Ak. (cl. 2); Gain
D_{59} N.J. Gain	D_{58} Nev. Gain	D_{57} Minn. Gain	D_{56} Mich. Gain	D_{55} Maine; Gain	D_{54} Ind. Gain	D_{53} Conn. Gain	D_{52} Calif. Gain	D_{51} Ak. (cl. 3); Gain	D_{50} Ak. (cl. 2); Gain
D_{60} Ohio; Gain	D_{61} Utah; Gain	D_{62} W.Va. (reg); Gain	D_{63} W.Va. (sp); Gain (Note: Appointee defeated)	D_{64} Wyo. Gain	R_{34} Vt. Hold	R_{33} Pa. Hold	R_{32} N.D. Re-elected	R_{31} N.Y. Hold	R_{30} Neb. Re-elected
R_{20}	R_{21}	R_{22}	R_{23}	R_{24}	R_{25}	R_{26}	R_{27} Ariz. Re-elected	R_{28} Del. Re-elected	R_{29} Md. Re-elected
R_{19}	R_{18}	R_{17}	R_{16}	R_{15}	R_{14}	R_{13}	R_{12}	R_{11}	R_{10}
	R_{1}	R_{2}	R_{3}	R_{4}	R_{5}	R_{6}	R_{7}	R_{8}	R_{9}

Key:	D_{#} / Democratic; R_{#} / Republican

== Race summaries ==
=== Special / new state elections ===
In the special elections, the winners were seated during 1958 or before January 3, 1959. In the new state elections, the winners were seated with the new Congress on January 3, 1959. Ordered by election date.

State	Incumbent			Results	Candidates
State	Senator	Party	Electoral history	Results	Candidates
North Carolina (class 2)	B. Everett Jordan	Democratic	1958 (Appointed)	Interim appointee elected November 4, 1958.	▌ ✓ B. Everett Jordan (Democratic) 70.0%; ▌Richard C. Clarke, Jr. (Republican) 30.0%
West Virginia (class 2)	John D. Hoblitzell Jr.	Republican	1958 (Appointed)	Interim appointee lost election. New senator elected November 4, 1958. Democratic gain.	▌ ✓ Jennings Randolph (Democratic) 59.3%; ▌John D. Hoblitzell, Jr. (Republican) 40.7%
Alaska (class 2)	Alaska admitted as a state January 3, 1959.			New state. New senator elected November 25, 1958. Democratic gain.	▌ ✓ Bob Bartlett (Democratic) 83.8%; ▌R. E. Robertson (Republican) 15.0%; ▌Keith Capper (write-in) 1.2%
Alaska (class 3)	Alaska admitted as a state January 3, 1959.			New state. New senator elected November 25, 1958. Democratic gain.	▌ ✓ Ernest Gruening (Democratic) 52.6%; ▌Mike Stepovich (Republican) 47.4%

=== Elections leading to the next Congress ===
In these regular elections, the winners were elected for the term beginning January 3, 1959; ordered by state.

All of the elections involved the Class 1 seats.

State	Incumbent			Results	Candidates
State	Senator	Party	Electoral history	Results	Candidates
Arizona	Barry Goldwater	Republican	1952	Incumbent re-elected.	▌ ✓ Barry Goldwater (Republican) 56.1%; ▌Ernest McFarland (Democratic) 43.9%
California	William Knowland	Republican	1945 (Appointed); 1946 (special); 1952	Incumbent retired to run for California Governor. New senator elected. Democratic gain.	▌ ✓ Clair Engle (Democratic) 57.0%; ▌Goodwin Knight (Republican) 42.9%
Connecticut	William A. Purtell	Republican	1952 (Appointed); 1952 (Retired); 1952	Incumbent lost re-election. New senator elected. Democratic gain.	▌ ✓ Thomas J. Dodd (Democratic) 57.3%; ▌William A. Purtell (Republican) 42.4%; ▌Vivien Kellems (write-in) 0.3%
Delaware	John J. Williams	Republican	1946; 1952	Incumbent re-elected.	▌ ✓ John J. Williams (Republican) 53.3%; ▌Elbert N. Carvel (Democratic) 46.7%
Florida	Spessard Holland	Democratic	1946 (Appointed); 1946; 1952	Incumbent re-elected.	▌ ✓ Spessard Holland (Democratic) 71.2%; ▌Leland Hyzer (Republican) 28.8%
Indiana	William E. Jenner	Republican	1944 (special); 1946; 1952	Incumbent retired. New senator elected. Democratic gain.	▌ ✓ Vance Hartke (Democratic) 56.5%; ▌Harold W. Handley (Republican) 42.4%; ▌John Henry Stelle (Prohibition) 1.1%
Maine	Frederick G. Payne	Republican	1952	Incumbent lost re-election. New senator elected. Democratic gain.	▌ ✓ Edmund Muskie (Democratic) 60.8%; ▌Frederick G. Payne (Republican) 39.2%
Maryland	J. Glenn Beall	Republican	1952	Incumbent re-elected.	▌ ✓ J. Glenn Beall (Republican) 51.0%; ▌Thomas D'Alesandro Jr. (Democratic) 49.0%
Massachusetts	John F. Kennedy	Democratic	1952	Incumbent re-elected.	▌ ✓ John F. Kennedy (Democratic) 73.2%; ▌Vincent J. Celeste (Republican) 26.2%
Michigan	Charles E. Potter	Republican	1952 (special); 1952	Incumbent lost re-election. New senator elected. Democratic gain.	▌ ✓ Philip Hart (Democratic) 53.6%; ▌Charles E. Potter (Republican) 46.1%
Minnesota	Edward J. Thye	Republican	1946; 1952	Incumbent lost re-election. New senator elected. Democratic–Farmer–Labor gain.	▌ ✓ Eugene McCarthy (DFL) 52.9%; ▌Edward J. Thye (Republican) 46.6%; ▌William M. Curran (Socialist Workers) 0.5%
Mississippi	John C. Stennis	Democratic	1947 (special); 1952	Incumbent re-elected.	▌ ✓ John C. Stennis (Democratic); Unopposed
Missouri	Stuart Symington	Democratic	1952	Incumbent re-elected.	▌ ✓ Stuart Symington (Democratic) 66.5%; ▌Hazel Palmer (Republican) 33.6%
Montana	Mike Mansfield	Democratic	1952	Incumbent re-elected.	▌ ✓ Mike Mansfield (Democratic) 76.2%; ▌Lou W. Welch (Republican) 23.8%
Nebraska	Roman Hruska	Republican	1954 (special)	Incumbent re-elected.	▌ ✓ Roman Hruska (Republican) 55.6%; ▌Frank B. Morrison (Democratic) 44.4%
Nevada	George W. Malone	Republican	1946; 1952	Incumbent lost re-election. New senator elected. Democratic gain.	▌ ✓ Howard Cannon (Democratic) 57.7%; ▌George W. Malone (Republican) 42.3%
New Jersey	Howard Alexander Smith	Republican	1944 (special); 1946; 1952	Incumbent retired. New senator elected. Democratic gain.	▌ ✓ Harrison A. Williams (Democratic) 51.4%; ▌Robert Kean (Republican) 46.9%
New Mexico	Dennis Chávez	Democratic	1935 (Appointed); 1936 (special); 1940; 1946; 1952	Incumbent re-elected.	▌ ✓ Dennis Chávez (Democratic) 62.7%; ▌Forrest S. Atchley (Republican) 37.3%
New York	Irving Ives	Republican	1946; 1952	Incumbent retired. New senator elected. Republican hold.	▌ ✓ Kenneth Keating (Republican) 50.8%; ▌Frank Hogan (Democratic) 48.4%
North Dakota	William Langer	Republican	1940; 1946; 1952	Incumbent re-elected.	▌ ✓ William Langer (Republican) 57.2%; ▌Raymond Vensdel (Democratic-NPL) 41.5%
Ohio	John W. Bricker	Republican	1946; 1952	Incumbent lost re-election. New senator elected. Democratic gain.	▌ ✓ Stephen M. Young (Democratic) 52.5%; ▌John W. Bricker (Republican) 47.5%
Pennsylvania	Edward Martin	Republican	1946; 1952	Incumbent retired. New senator elected. Republican hold.	▌ ✓ Hugh Scott (Republican) 51.2%; ▌George M. Leader (Democratic) 48.4%
Rhode Island	John Pastore	Democratic	1950 (special); 1952	Incumbent re-elected.	▌ ✓ John Pastore (Democratic) 64.5%; ▌Bayard Ewing (Republican) 35.5%
Tennessee	Albert Gore Sr.	Democratic	1952	Incumbent re-elected.	▌ ✓ Albert Gore Sr. (Democratic) 79.0%; ▌Hobart F. Atkins (Republican) 19.0%
Texas	Ralph Yarborough	Democratic	1957 (special)	Incumbent re-elected.	▌ ✓ Ralph Yarborough (Democratic) 74.6%; ▌Roy Whittenburg (Republican) 23.6%
Utah	Arthur V. Watkins	Republican	1946; 1952	Incumbent lost re-election. New senator elected. Democratic gain.	▌ ✓ Frank Moss (Democratic) 38.7%; ▌Arthur V. Watkins (Republican) 34.8%; ▌J. Bracken Lee (Independent) 26.4%
Vermont	Ralph Flanders	Republican	1946 (Appointed); 1946 (special); 1952	Incumbent retired. New senator elected. Republican hold.	▌ ✓ Winston L. Prouty (Republican) 52.2%; ▌Frederick J. Fayette (Democratic) 47.8%
Virginia	Harry F. Byrd	Democratic	1933 (Appointed); 1933 (special); 1934; 1940; 1946; 1952	Incumbent re-elected.	▌ ✓ Harry F. Byrd (Democratic) 69.3%; ▌Louise Wensel (Independent) 26.3%
Washington	Henry M. Jackson	Democratic	1952	Incumbent re-elected.	▌ ✓ Henry M. Jackson (Democratic) 67.3%; ▌William B. Bantz (Republican) 31.4%
West Virginia	Chapman Revercomb	Republican	1942; 1948 (Lost); 1956 (special)	Incumbent lost re-election. New senator elected. Democratic gain.	▌ ✓ Robert Byrd (Democratic) 59.2%; ▌Chapman Revercomb (Republican) 40.8%
Wisconsin	William Proxmire	Democratic	1957 (special)	Incumbent re-elected.	▌ ✓ William Proxmire (Democratic) 57.1%; ▌Roland J. Steinle (Republican) 42.7%
Wyoming	Frank A. Barrett	Republican	1952	Incumbent lost re-election. New senator elected. Democratic gain.	▌ ✓ Gale W. McGee (Democratic) 50.8%; ▌Frank A. Barrett (Republican) 49.2%

== Closest races ==
Eleven races had a margin of victory under 10%:

State	Party of winner	Margin
Wyoming	Democratic (flip)	1.6%
Maryland	Republican	2.0%
New York	Republican	2.4%
Utah	Democratic (flip)	3.9%
Vermont	Republican	4.4%
New Jersey	Democratic (flip)	4.5%
Ohio	Democratic (flip)	5.0%
Alaska (class 3)	Democratic (flip)	5.2%
Minnesota	Democratic (flip)	6.3%
Delaware	Republican	6.6%
Michigan	Democratic (flip)	7.5%

Maine was the tipping point state with a margin of 21.6%.

== Alaska ==
Alaska would become a new state January 3, 1959, and it elected two initial senators November 25, 1958, in advance of statehood. The Democratic Party thereby picked up 2 more seats.

In their next elections, Alaska's senators would be elected to 6-year terms.

1958 class 2 Senate election
- November 25, 1958
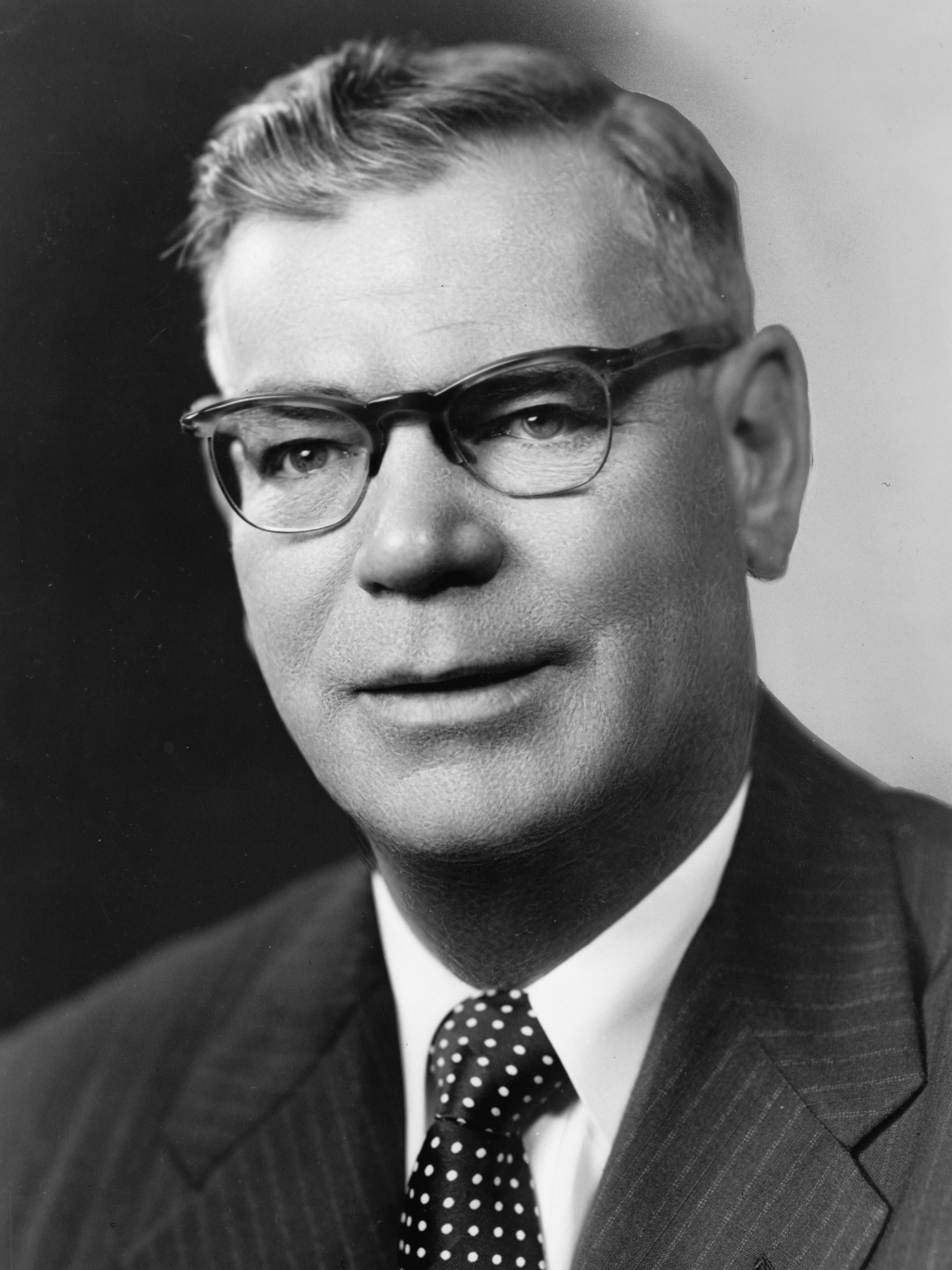

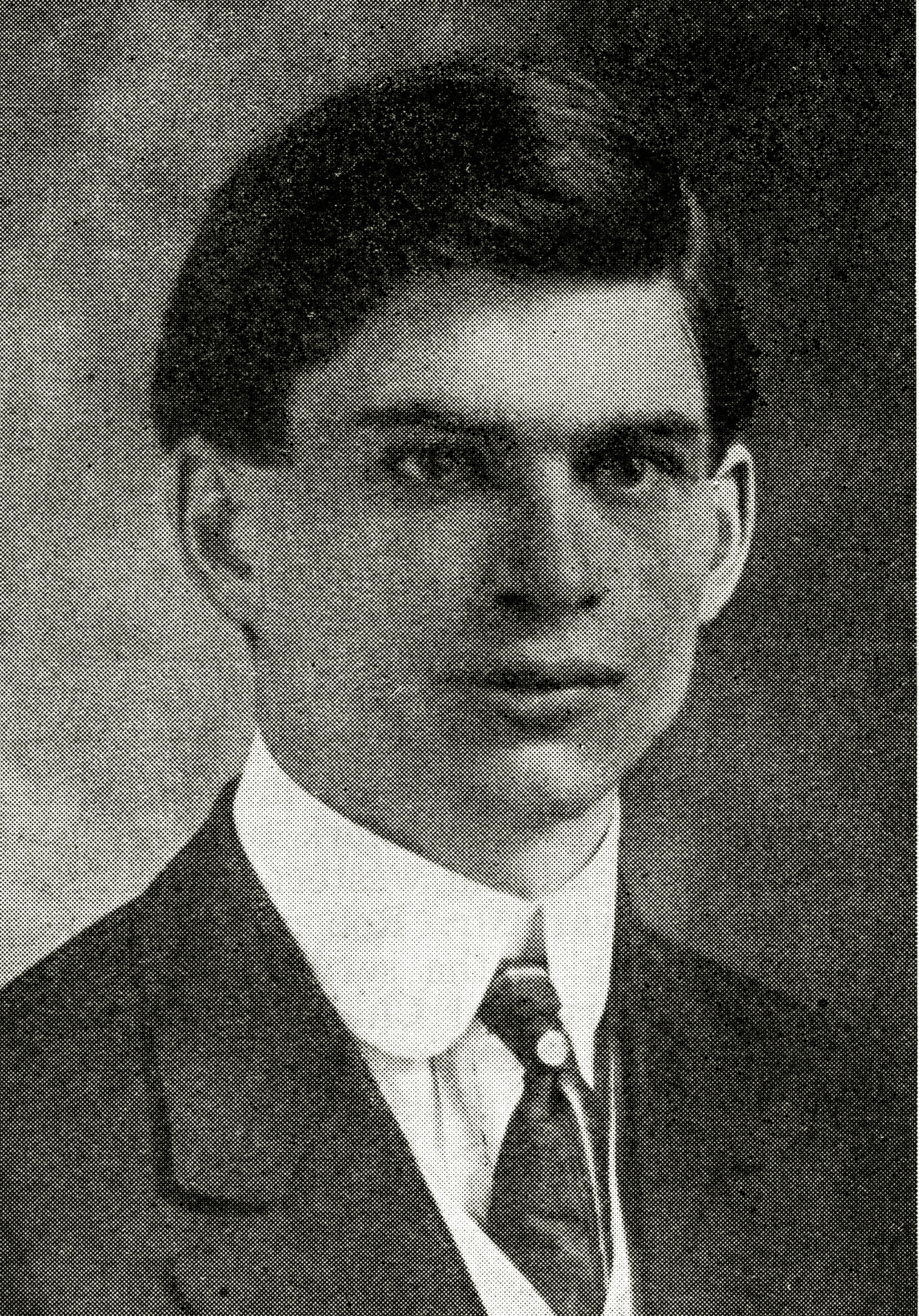
Nominee	Bob Bartlett	R. E. Robertson
Party	Democratic	Republican
Popular vote	40,939	7,299
Percentage	83.83%	14.95%
- Results by election district Bartlett: 70–80% 80–90%
Elected U.S. Senator
Bob Bartlett
Democratic

The class 2 race, for the 2-year term ending in 1961, was between the Democratic incumbent territorial delegate Bob Bartlett, and the Republican Juneau attorney R. E. Robertson.

Alaska regular election (class 2)
Party	Candidate	Votes	%
Democratic	Bob Bartlett	40,939	83.83
Republican	R. E. Robertson	7,299	14.95
Write-In	Keith Capper	599	1.23
Majority		33,640	68.88
Turnout		48,837	
Democratic win (new seat)			

Bartlett would be re-elected twice and serve until his death in 1968.

1958 class 3 Senate election
- November 25, 1958
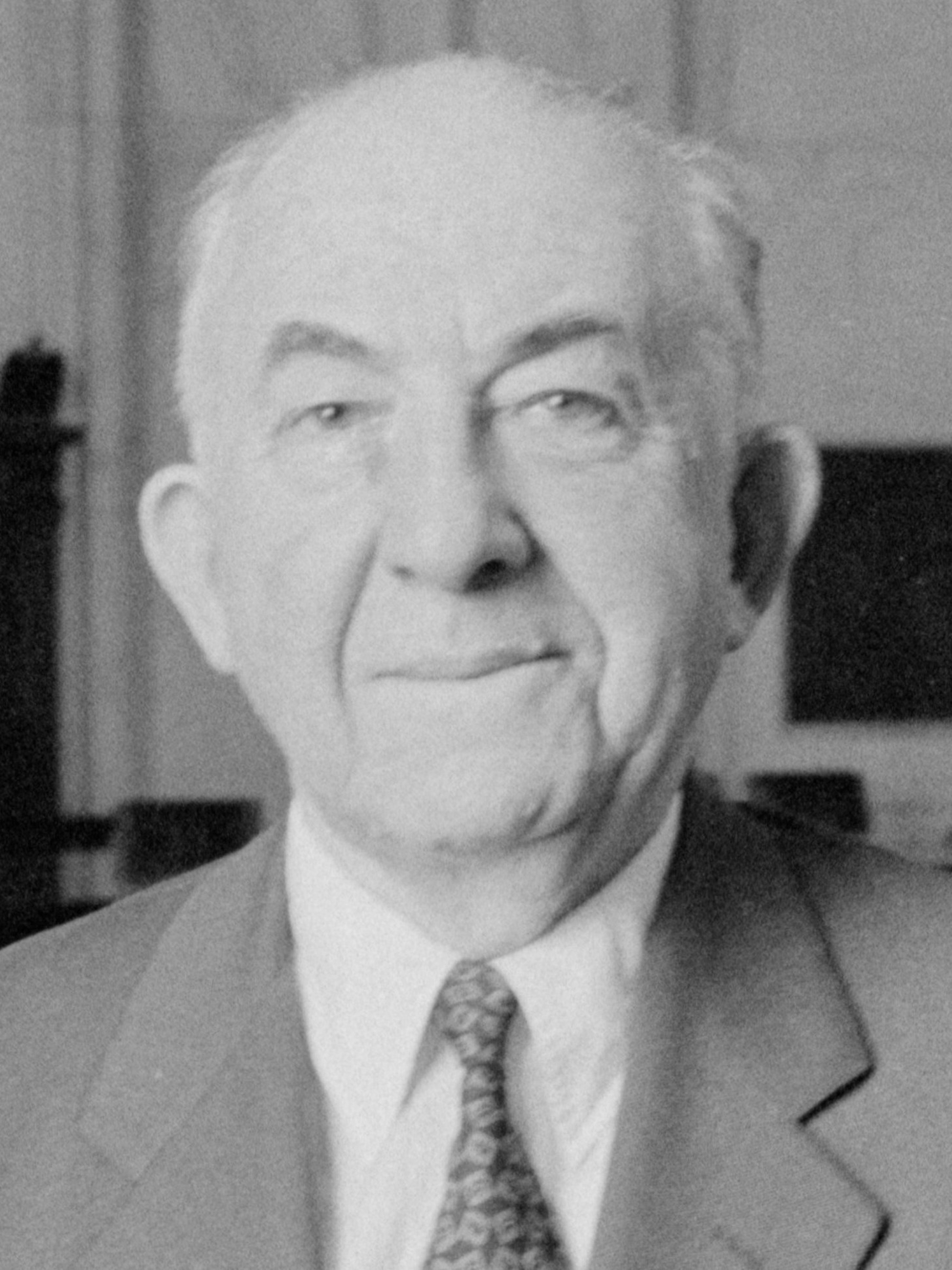

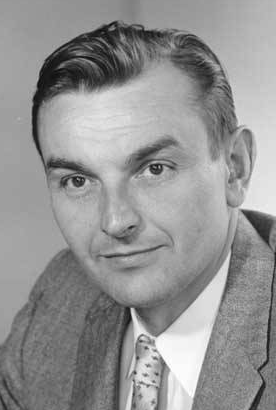
Nominee	Ernest Gruening	Mike Stepovich
Party	Democratic	Republican
Popular vote	26,045	23,464
Percentage	52.61%	47.39%
- Results by election district Gruening: 50–60% 60–70% 70–80% Stepovich: 50–60% 60–70%
Elected U.S. Senator
Ernest Gruening
Democratic

The class 3 race, for the 4-year term ending in 1963, pitted two former territorial governors, Democrat Ernest Gruening against Republican Mike Stepovich. Gruening won a close race.

Alaska regular election (class 3)
Party	Candidate	Votes	%
Democratic	Ernest Gruening	26,045	52.61
Republican	Mike Stepovich	23,464	47.39
Majority		2,581	5.22
Turnout		49,509	
Democratic win (new seat)			

Gruening would be re-elected in 1962 and serve until losing renomination in 1968.

== Arizona ==
1958 United States Senate election in Arizona
- November 4, 1958
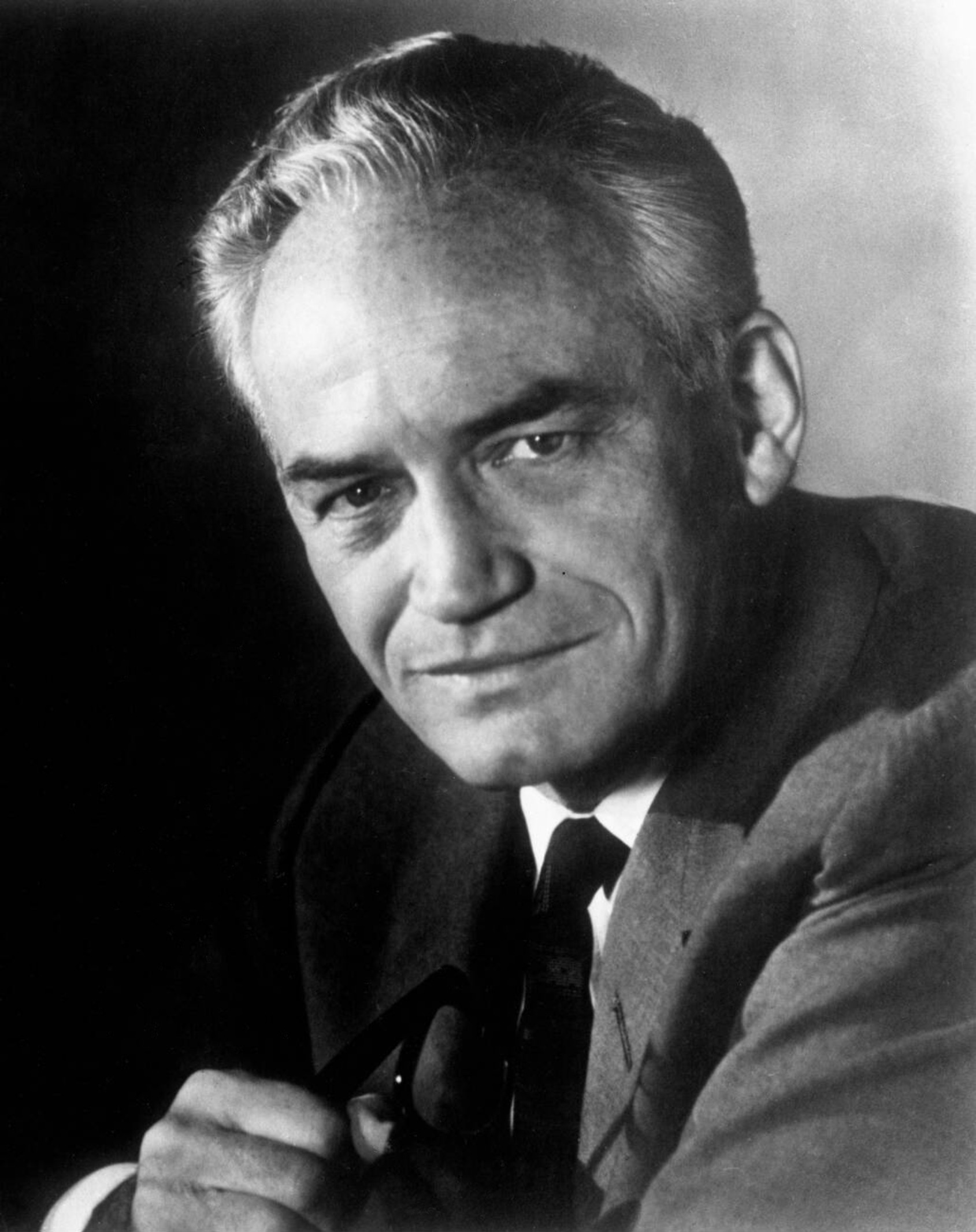

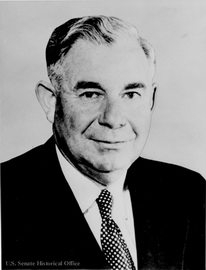
Nominee	Barry Goldwater	Ernest McFarland
Party	Republican	Democratic
Popular vote	164,593	129,030
Percentage	56.06%	43.94%
- County results Goldwater: 50–60% 60–70% McFarland: 50–60% 60–70%
U.S. senator before election
Barry Goldwater
Republican
Elected U.S. Senator
Barry Goldwater
Republican

Arizona general election 1958
Party	Candidate	Votes	%
Republican	Barry Goldwater (Incumbent)	164,593	56.06%
Democratic	Ernest W. McFarland	129,030	43.94%
Majority		35,563	12.12%
Turnout		293,623	
Republican hold			

== California ==
1958 United States Senate election in California
- November 4, 1958
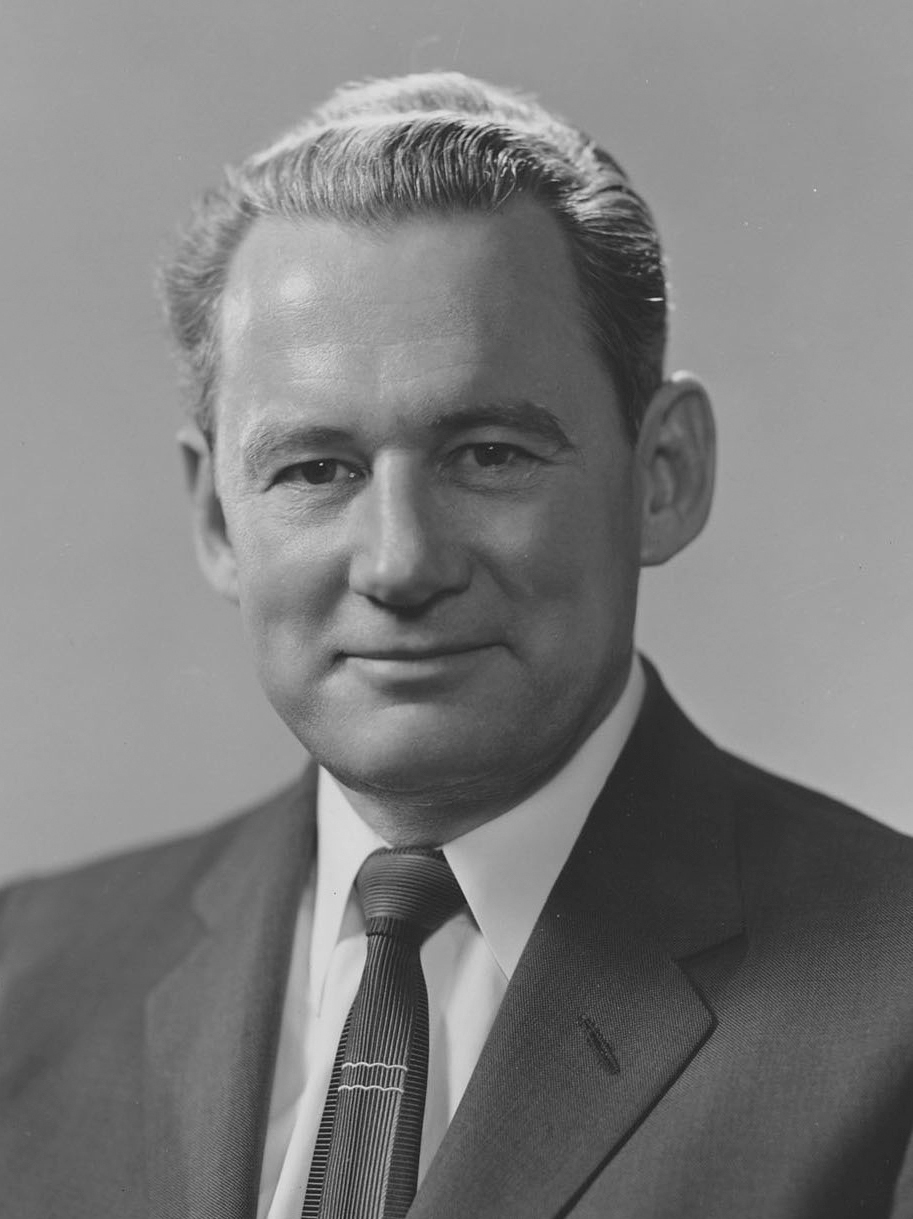

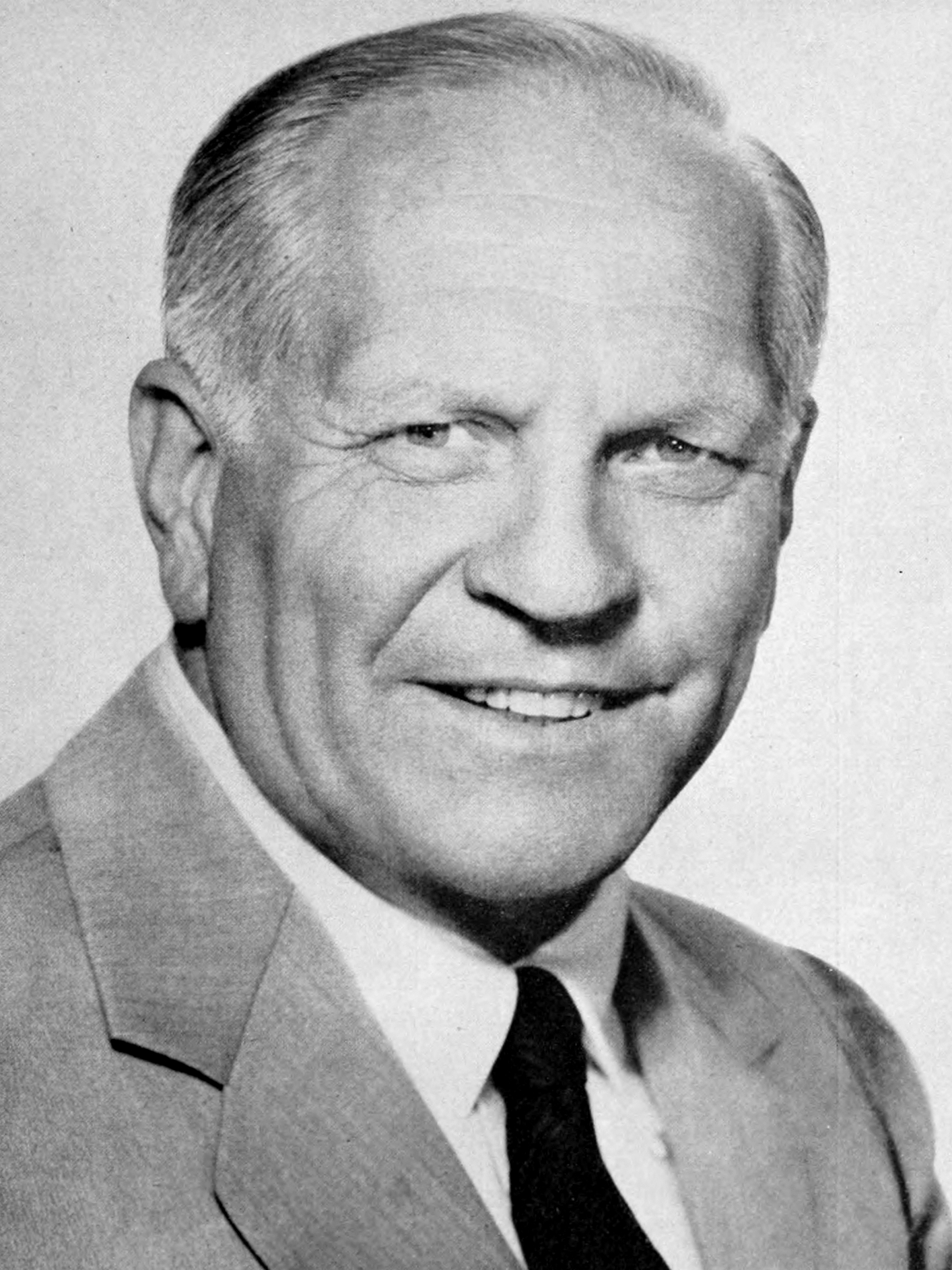
Nominee	Clair Engle	Goodwin Knight
Party	Democratic	Republican
Popular vote	2,927,693	2,204,337
Percentage	57.01%	42.93%
- County results Engle: 50–60% 60–70% 70–80% 80–90% Knight: 50–60%
U.S. senator before election
William F. Knowland
Republican
Elected U.S. Senator
Clair Engle
Democratic

California general election 1958
Party	Candidate	Votes	%
Democratic	Clair Engle	2,927,693	57.01
Republican	Goodwin Knight	2,204,337	42.93
Write-In	Jesse M. Ritchie	892	0.02
Write-In	Ray B. Pollard	281	0.01
None	Scattering	2,018	0.04
Majority		723,356	14.08
Turnout		5,135,221	
Democratic gain from Republican			

== Connecticut ==
1958 United States Senate election in Connecticut
- November 4, 1958
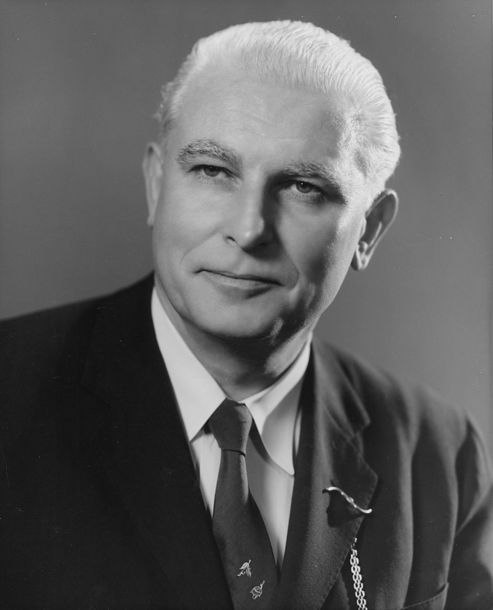

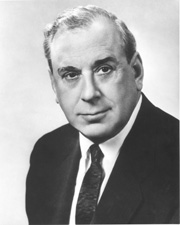
Nominee	Thomas J. Dodd	William A. Purtell
Party	Democratic	Republican
Popular vote	554,841	410,622
Percentage	57.29%	42.40%
- Dodd: 50–60% 60–70% 70–80% Purtell: 50–60% 60–70% 70–80% Tie: 50%
U.S. senator before election
William A. Purtell
Republican
Elected U.S. Senator
Thomas J. Dodd
Democratic

In Connecticut, Democrat Thomas J. Dodd defeated incumbent senator William A. Purtell who ran for a second term.

Connecticut general election 1958
Party	Candidate	Votes	%
Democratic	Thomas J. Dodd	554,841	57.28
Republican	William A. Purtell (Incumbent)	410,622	42.39
Independent	Vivien Kellems	3,043	0.31
None	Scattering	119	0.01
Majority		144,219	14.89
Turnout		968,625	
Democratic gain from Republican			

== Delaware ==
1958 United States Senate election in Delaware
- November 4, 1958
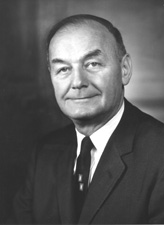

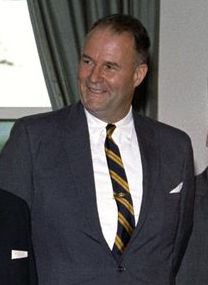
Nominee	John J. Williams	Elbert Carvel
Party	Republican	Democratic
Popular vote	82,280	72,152
Percentage	53.28%	46.72%
- County results Williams: 50–60%
U.S. senator before election
John J. Williams
Republican
Elected U.S. Senator
John J. Williams
Republican

Two-term Republican John J. Williams was re-elected to a third term.

Delaware general election 1958
Party	Candidate	Votes	%
Republican	John J. Williams (Incumbent)	82,280	53.28
Democratic	Elbert Carvel	72,152	46.72
Majority		10,128	6.56
Turnout		154,432	
Republican hold			

Williams would be re-elected in 1964, serving four terms until his 1970 retirement.

== Florida ==
1958 United States Senate election in Florida
- November 4, 1958
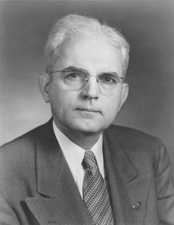

Nominee	Spessard Holland	Leland Hyzer
Party	Democratic	Republican
Popular vote	386,113	155,956
Percentage	71.23%	28.77%
- County results Holland: 50–60% 60–70% 70–80% 80–90% >90%
U.S. senator before election
Spessard Holland
Democratic
Elected U.S. Senator
Spessard Holland
Democratic

Incumbent Democrat Senator Holland, a conservative, was challenged by former senator Claude Pepper, who had been unseated in 1950. Holland had played a role in recruiting George A. Smathers to run against the liberal Pepper in that election. The two served as colleagues in the Senate from 1947 to 1951.

Democratic primary
Party	Candidate	Votes	%
Democratic	Spessard L. Holland (Incumbent)	408,084	55.94
Democratic	Claude Pepper	321,377	44.06
Total votes		729,461	100.00

General election results
Party	Candidate	Votes	%	±%
Democratic	Spessard Holland (Incumbent)	386,113	71.23	▼28.59
Republican	Leland Hyzer	155,956	28.77	▲28.77
Majority		230,157	42.46	
Turnout		542,069		
Democratic hold				

== Indiana ==
1958 United States Senate election in Indiana
- November 4, 1958
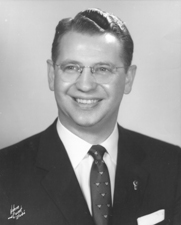

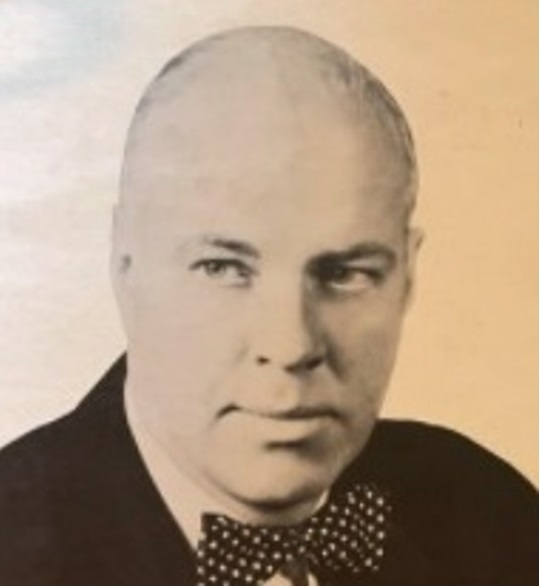
Nominee	Vance Hartke	Harold W. Handley
Party	Democratic	Republican
Popular vote	973,636	731,635
Percentage	56.46%	42.42%
- County results Hartke: 40–50% 50–60% 60–70% Handley: 40–50% 50–60% 60–70%
U.S. senator before election
William E. Jenner
Republican
Elected U.S. Senator
Vance Hartke
Democratic

Incumbent Republican William E. Jenner did not seek a second full term in office and was replaced by Democrat Vance Hartke, the mayor of Evansville. Hartke defeated incumbent Republican Governor of Indiana Harold W. Handley.

Jenner resigned shortly before the election and urged Handley, Jenner's political protégé, to seek his seat. A plan was proposed whereby Handley would resign the governorship, his lieutenant would appoint him senator, and he would finish the term and run as an incumbent. When the plan was revealed to the party leadership, they strongly advised him to not implement it because they feared it would hurt the party and be perceived as a scandal.

Handley did not resign from the governorship during his campaign and was widely criticized for the unprecedented action. Hartke accused Handley of raising taxes, breaking of his campaign promise, his reluctance in supporting right-to-work, and rising state unemployment. Statewide unemployment was just above 10% in April, but dropped to 6.9% by the end of September.

Indiana general election 1958
Party	Candidate	Votes	%
Democratic	Vance Hartke	973,636	56.47
Republican	Harold W. Handley	731,635	42.43
Prohibition	John Stelle	19,040	1.10
Majority		242,001	14.04
Turnout		1,724,311	
Democratic gain from Republican			

== Maine ==
1958 United States Senate election in Maine
- September 8, 1958
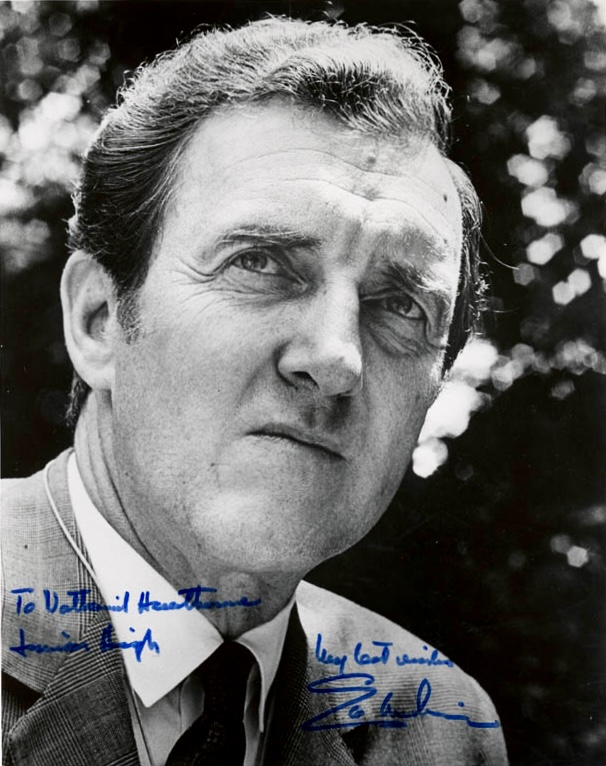

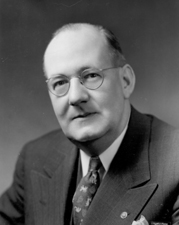
Nominee	Edmund Muskie	Frederick G. Payne
Party	Democratic	Republican
Popular vote	172,704	111,522
Percentage	60.76%	39.24%
- County Results; Muskie: 50–60% 50–60% Payne: 50–60%
U.S. senator before election
Frederick G. Payne
Republican
Elected U.S. Senator
Edmund Muskie
Democratic

Maine held its election September 8, 1958, in keeping with its routine practice of holding elections before the November national Election Day. Democrat Edmund Muskie defeated one-term Republican incumbent, Frederick G. Payne by a wide margin, 61–39%.

Maine general election 1958
Party	Candidate	Votes	%
Democratic	Edmund Muskie	172,704	60.76%
Republican	Frederick G. Payne (Incumbent)	111,522	39.24%
Majority		61,182	21.52%
Turnout		284,226	
Democratic gain from Republican			

== Maryland ==
Maryland election
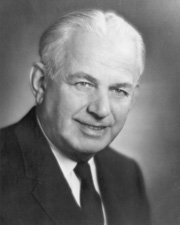

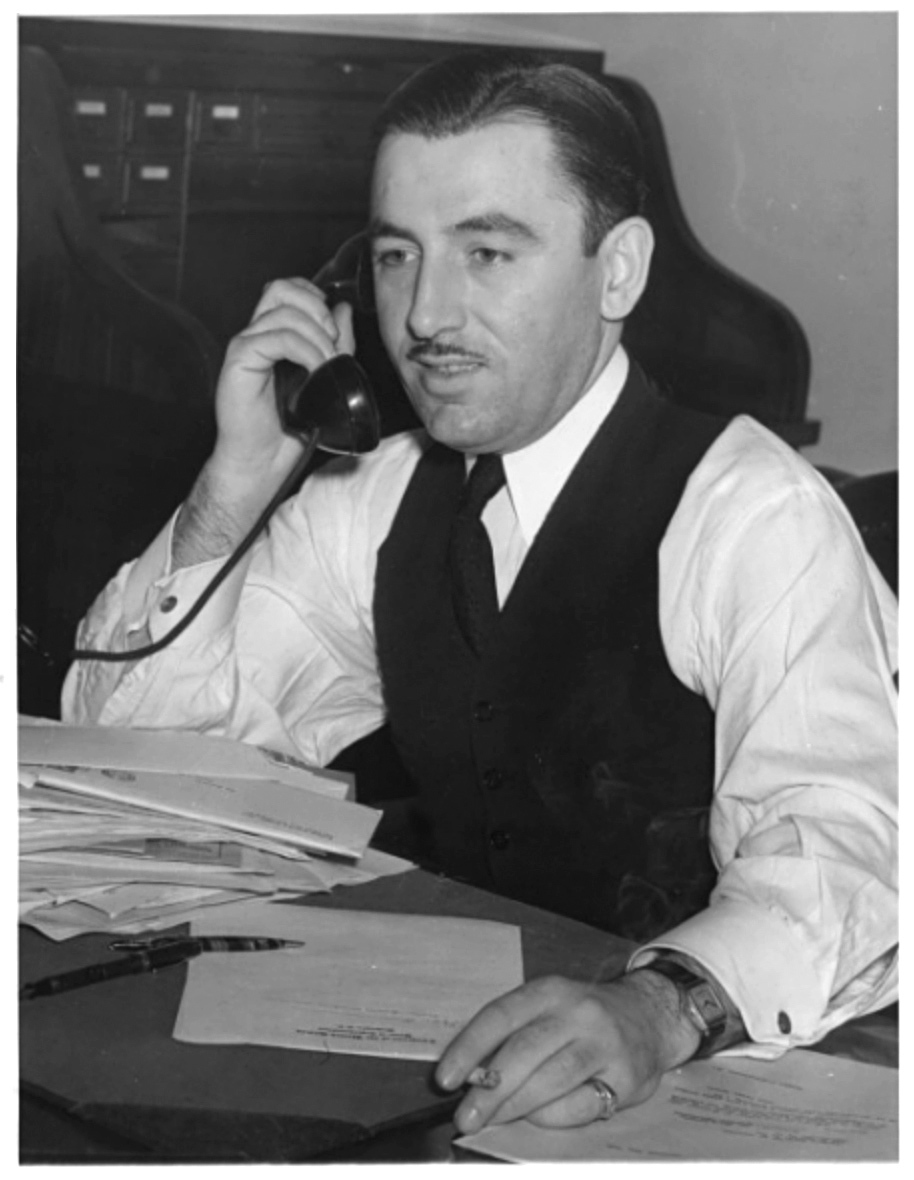
Nominee	J. Glenn Beall	Thomas D'Alesandro Jr.
Party	Republican	Democratic
Popular vote	384,931	367,142
Percentage	51.18%	48.82
- County; Beall: 50–60% 60–70% D'Alesandro: 50–60%
U.S. senator before election
J. Glenn Beall
Republican
Elected U.S. senator
J. Glenn Beall
Republican

Maryland general election 1958
Party	Candidate	Votes	%
Republican	J. Glenn Beall (Incumbent)	384,931	51.18%
Democratic	Thomas D'Alesandro Jr.	367,142	48.82%
Majority		17,789	3.36%
Turnout		752,073	
Republican hold			

== Massachusetts ==
1958 United States Senate election in Massachusetts
- November 4, 1958
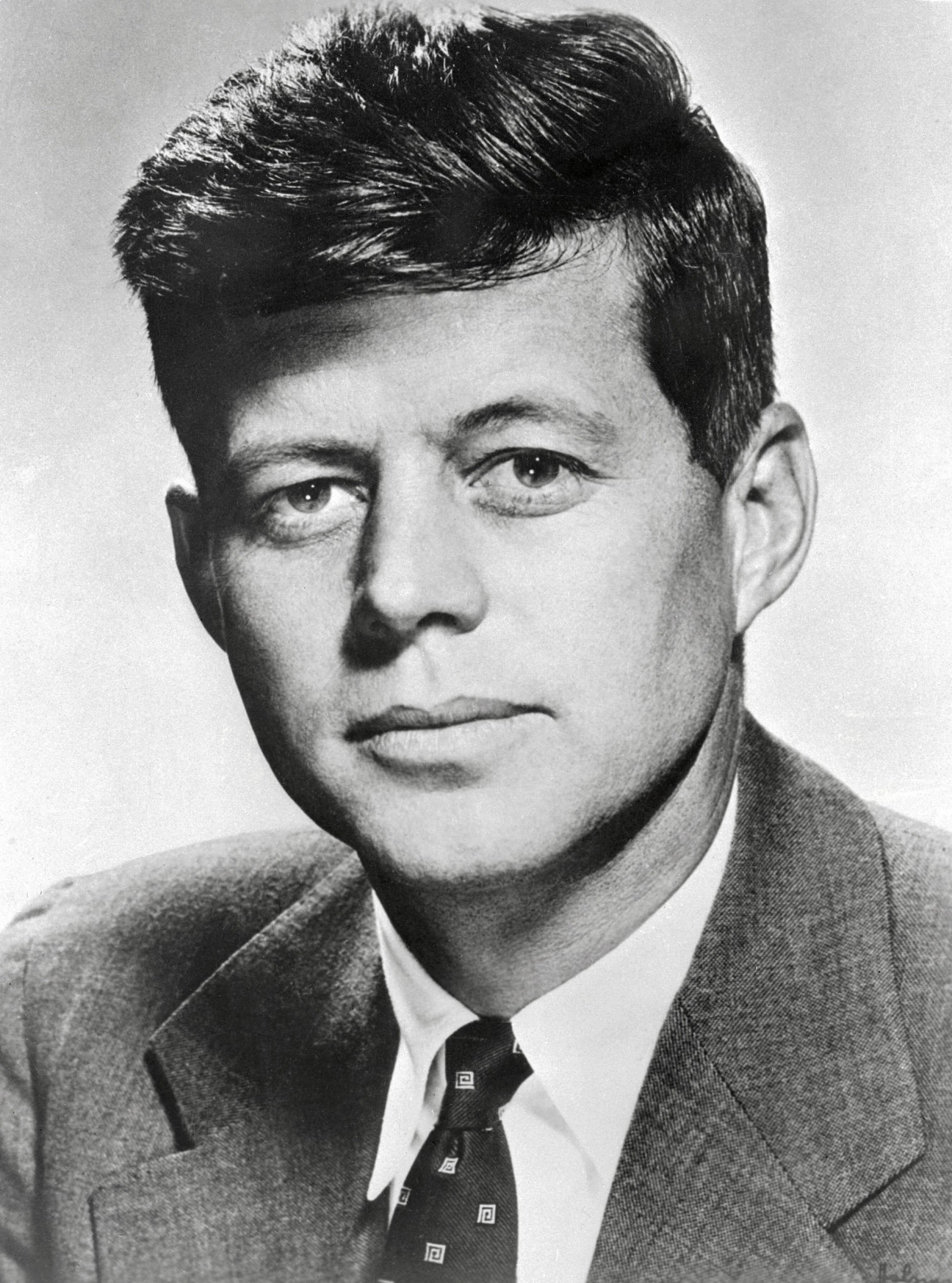

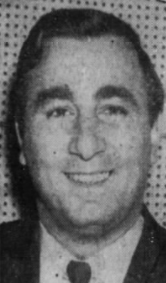
Nominee	John F. Kennedy	Vincent Celeste
Party	Democratic	Republican
Popular vote	1,362,926	488,318
Percentage	73.20%	26.23%

Kennedy
40–50%
50–60%
60–70%
70–80%
80–90%
90–100%
Celeste
40–50%
50–60%
60–70%
70–80%
U.S. senator before election
John F. Kennedy
Democratic
Elected U.S. Senator
John F. Kennedy
Democratic

Massachusetts general election 1958
Party	Candidate	Votes	%
Democratic	John F. Kennedy (Incumbent)	1,362,926	73.20%
Republican	Vincent J. Celeste	488,318	26.22%
Socialist Labor	Lawrence Gilfedder	5,457	0.29%
Prohibition	Mark R. Shaw	5,335	0.29%
None	Scattering	5	0.00%
Majority		874,608	46.98%
Turnout		1,862,041	
Democratic hold			

== Michigan ==
1958 United States Senate election in Michigan
- November 4, 1958
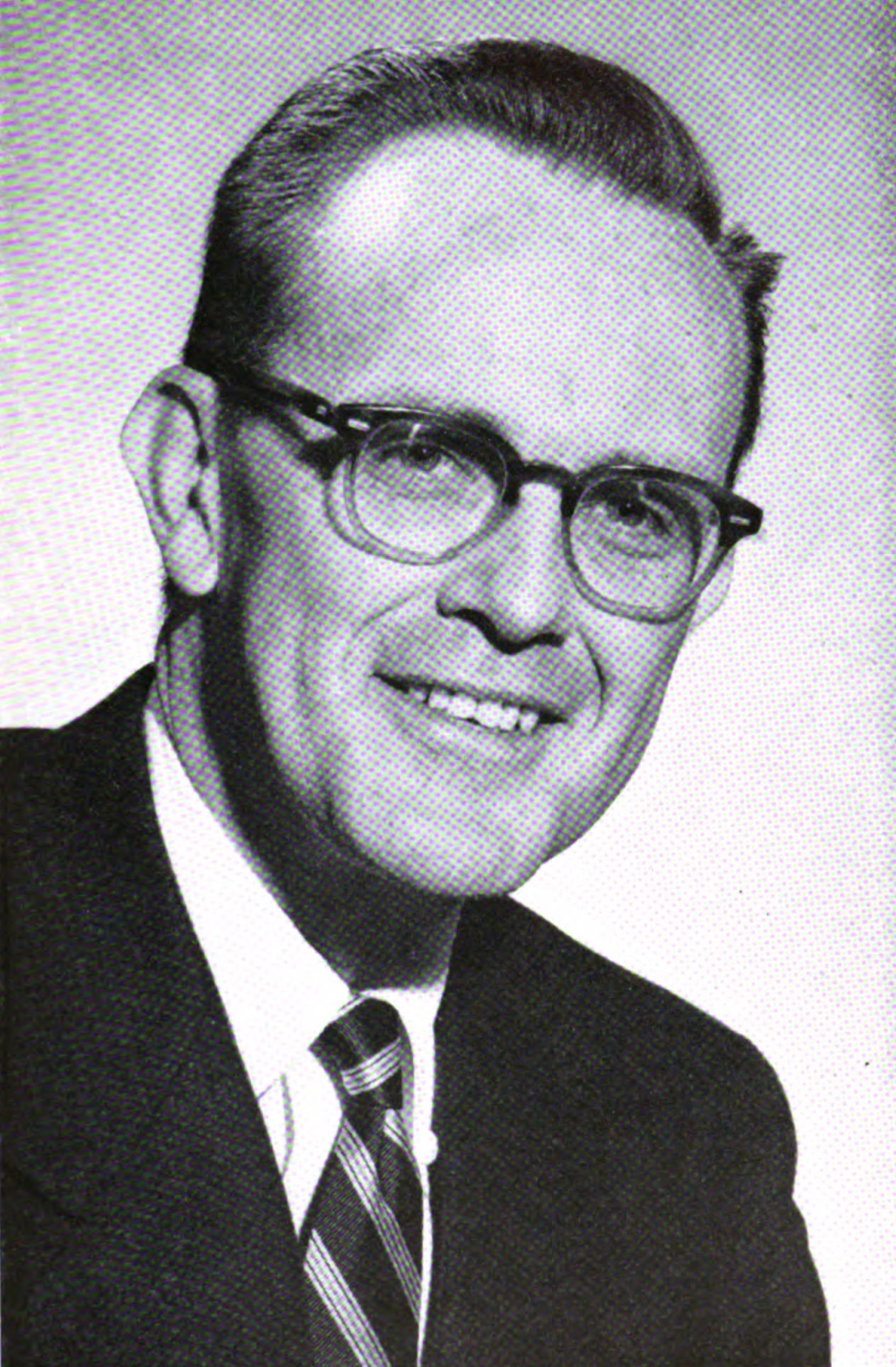

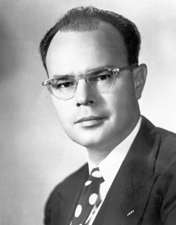
Nominee	Philip Hart	Charles E. Potter
Party	Democratic	Republican
Popular vote	1,216,966	1,046,963
Percentage	53.57%	46.09%
- County results Hart: 50–60% 60–70% Potter: 50–60% 60–70% 70–80%
U.S. senator before election
Charles E. Potter
Republican
Elected U.S. Senator
Philip Hart
Democratic

Michigan general election 1958
Party	Candidate	Votes	%
Democratic	Philip A. Hart	1,216,966	53.57%
Republican	Charles E. Potter (Incumbent)	1,046,963	46.09%
Prohibition	Elmer H. Ormiston	3,518	0.15%
Socialist Labor	James Sim	3,128	0.14%
Socialist Workers	Evelyn Sell	1,068	0.05%
None	Scattering	1	0.00%
Majority		170,003	7.48%
Turnout		2,271,644	
Democratic gain from Republican			

== Minnesota ==
1958 United States Senate election in Minnesota
- November 4, 1958
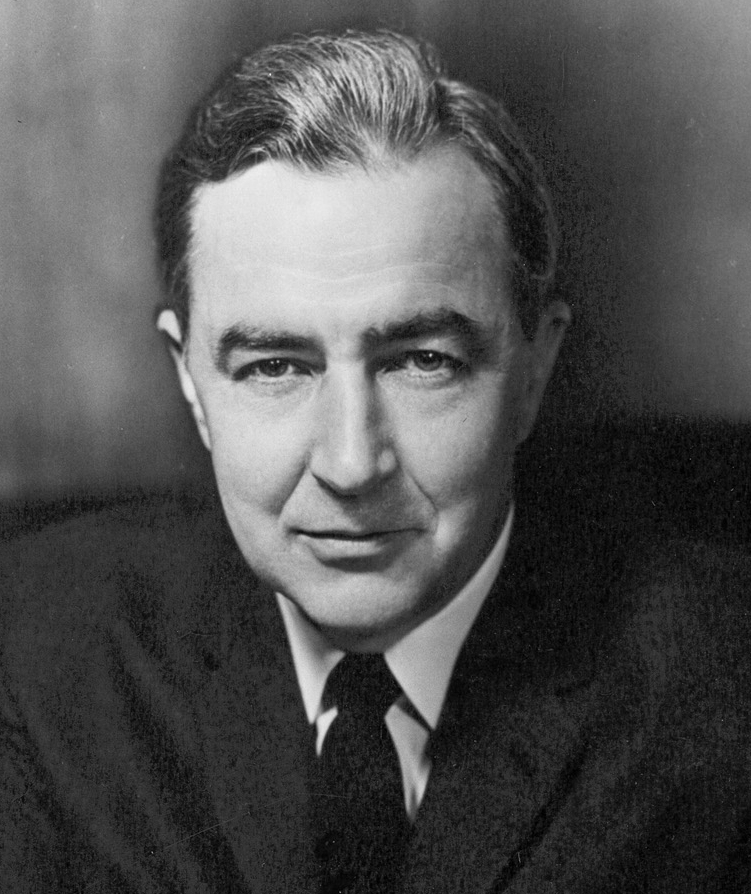

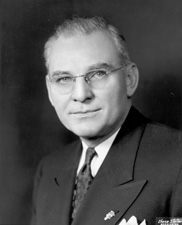
Nominee	Eugene J. McCarthy	Edward John Thye
Party	Democratic (DFL)	Republican
Popular vote	608,847	535,629
Percentage	52.95%	46.58%
- County results McCarthy: 50–60% 60–70% 70–80% Thye: 50–60% 60–70%
U.S. senator before election
Edward John Thye
Republican
Elected U.S. Senator
Eugene J. McCarthy
Democratic (DFL)

In Minnesota, Democratic Representative Eugene McCarthy defeated incumbent senator Edward John Thye who ran for a third term.

Democratic primary election
Party	Candidate	Votes	%
Democratic (DFL)	Eugene J. McCarthy	279,796	75.65%
Democratic (DFL)	Hjalmar Petersen	76,340	20.64%
Democratic (DFL)	Hans R. Miller	13,736	3.71%
Total votes		369,872	100.00%

Republican primary election
Party	Candidate	Votes	%
Republican	Edward John Thye (Incumbent)	224,833	91.81%
Republican	Edward C. Slettedahl	13,734	5.61%
Republican	Mrs. Peder P. Schmidt	6,332	2.58%
Total votes		244,899	100.00%

General election
Party	Candidate	Votes	%
Democratic (DFL)	Eugene J. McCarthy	608,847	52.95%
Republican	Edward John Thye (Incumbent)	535,629	46.58%
Socialist Workers	William M. Curran	5,407	0.47%
Total votes		1,149,883	100.00%
Majority		73,218	6.37%
Democratic (DFL) gain from Republican			

== Mississippi ==
1958 United States Senate election in Mississippi
- November 4, 1958
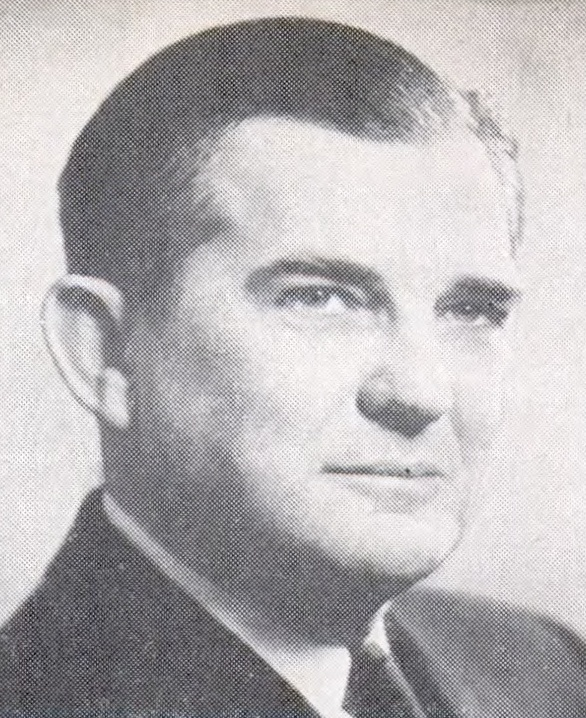
Nominee	John C. Stennis
Party	Democratic
Popular vote	61,039
Percentage	100.00%
- County results Stennis: 100%
U.S. senator before election
John C. Stennis
Democratic
Elected U.S. Senator
John C. Stennis
Democratic

Two-term Democrat John C. Stennis was re-elected with no opposition.

Mississippi general election 1958
Party	Candidate	Votes	%
Democratic	John C. Stennis (Incumbent)	61,039	100.00%
Democratic hold			

Stennis would be re-elected four more times, serving until his retirement in 1989.

== Missouri ==
1958 United States Senate election in Missouri
- November 4, 1958
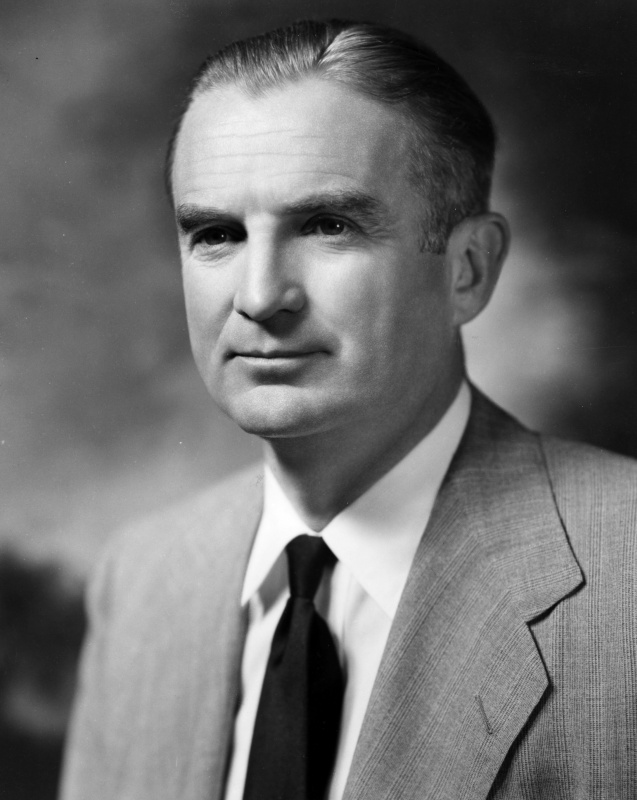

Nominee	Stuart Symington	Hazel Palmer
Party	Democratic	Republican
Popular vote	780,083	393,847
Percentage	66.45%	33.55%
- County results Symington: 50–60% 60–70% 80–90% >90% Palmer: 50–60% 60–70%
U.S. senator before election
Stuart Symington
Democratic
Elected U.S. Senator
Stuart Symington
Democratic

Incumbent Democrat Stuart Symington was re-elected to a second term. Hazel Palmer was the first woman ever nominated for United States senator in Missouri.

Democratic primary
Party	Candidate	Votes	%
Democratic	Stuart Symington (incumbent)	365,470	92.13%
Democratic	Lawrence Hastings	19,954	5.03%
Democratic	Lamar Dye	11,262	2.84%
Total votes		396,686	100.00%

Republican primary
Party	Candidate	Votes	%
Republican	Hazel Palmer	61,481	44.63%
Republican	William McKinley Thomas	36,438	26.45%
Republican	Homer Cotton	27,023	19.62%
Republican	Herman G. Grosby	12,818	9.31%
Total votes		137,760	100.00%

General election
Party	Candidate	Votes	%	±%
Democratic	Stuart Symington (Incumbent)	780,083	66.45%	▲12.46
Republican	Hazel Palmer	393,847	33.55%	▼12.39
Majority		386,236	32.90%	
Turnout		1,173,930		
Democratic hold		Swing		

== Montana ==
1958 United States Senate election in Montana
- November 4, 1958
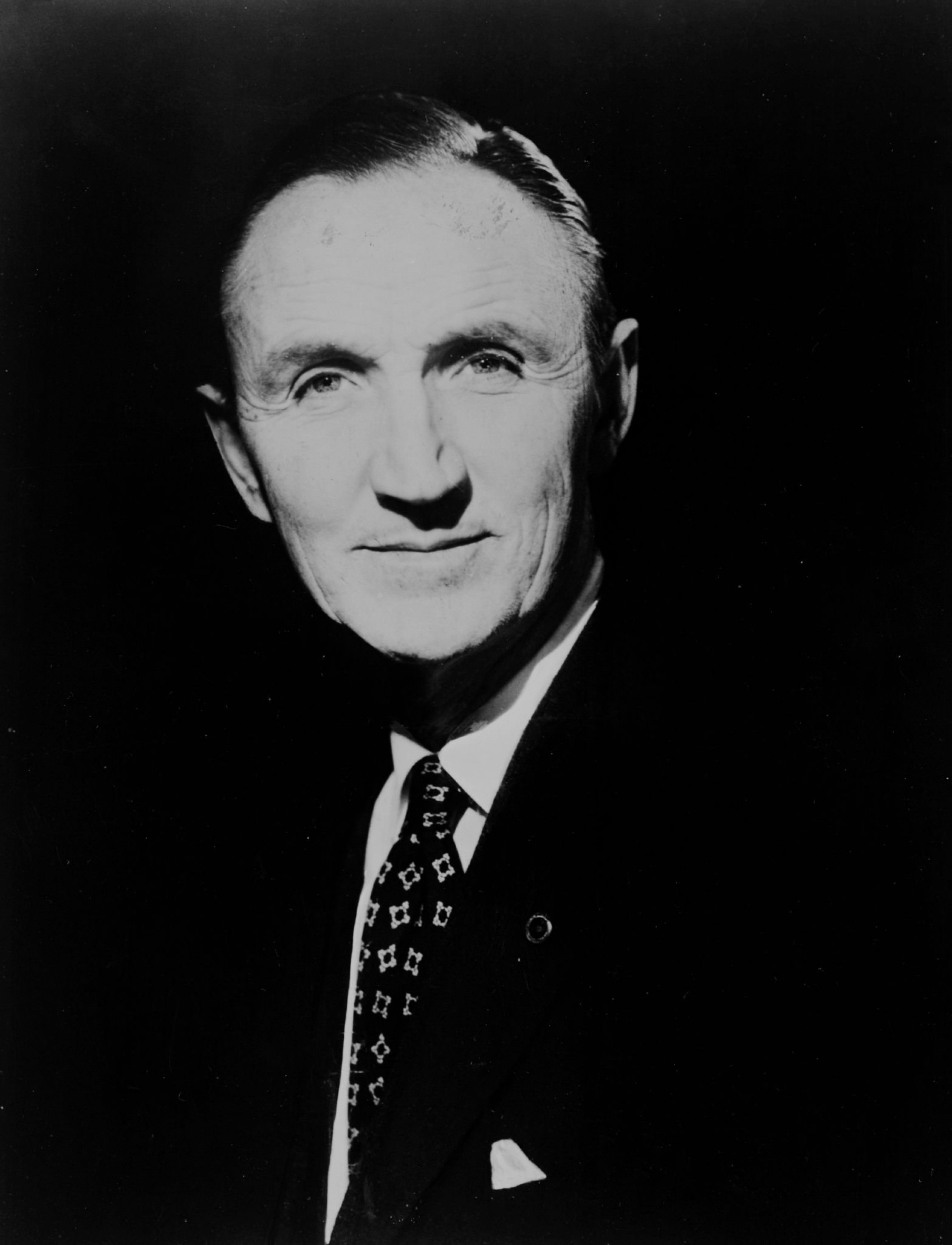

Nominee	Mike Mansfield	Lou Welch
Party	Democratic	Republican
Popular vote	174,910	54,573
Percentage	76.22%	23.78%
- County results Mansfield: 50–60% 60–70% 70–80% 80-90%
U.S. senator before election
Mike Mansfield
Democratic
Elected U.S. Senator
Mike Mansfield
Democratic

Incumbent Mike Mansfield, who was first elected to the Senate in 1952, ran for re-election. Mansfield won the Democratic primary comfortably, and moved on to the general election, where he was opposed by Lou W. Welch, a millworker and the Republican nominee. In contrast to the close campaign in 1952, Mansfield defeated Welch in a landslide and won his second term in the Senate easily.

Democratic primary
Party	Candidate	Votes	%
Democratic	Mike Mansfield (Incumbent)	97,207	91.72%
Democratic	J. M. Nickey	4,710	4.44%
Democratic	Thomas G. Stimatz, former State Representative	4,061	3.83%
Total votes		105,978	100.00%

Republican Primary
Party	Candidate	Votes	%
Republican	Lou W. Welch, millworker	19,860	50.30%
Republican	Blanche Anderson	19,624	49.70%
Total votes		39,484	100.00%

General election
Party	Candidate	Votes	%	±%
Democratic	Mike Mansfield (Incumbent)	174,910	76.22%	▲25.47%
Republican	Lou W. Welch	54,573	23.78%	▼24.77%
Majority		120,337	52.44%	▲50.25%
Turnout		229,483		
Democratic hold		Swing		

== Nebraska ==
Republican Roman Hruska had won a 1954 special election and ran for a full term. He beat Democratic attorney Frank B. Morrison, who had previously lost his challenger bid for Nebraska's 1st congressional district.

1958 United States Senate election in Nebraska
- November 4, 1958
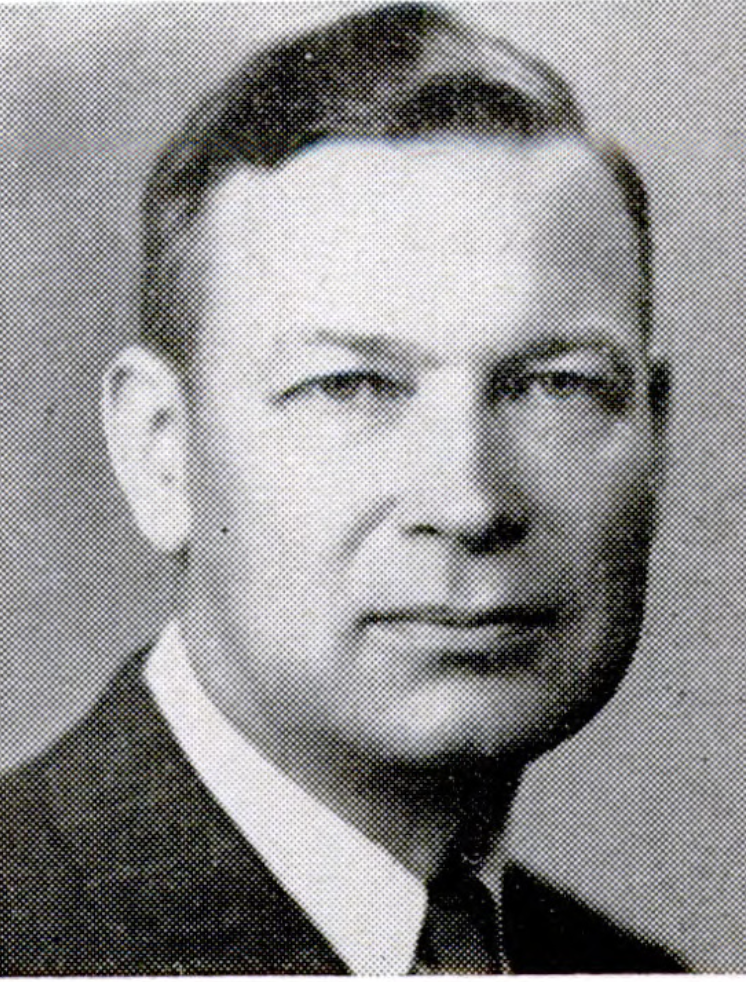

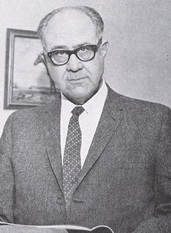
Nominee	Roman Hruska	Frank B. Morrison
Party	Republican	Democratic
Popular vote	232,227	185,152
Percentage	55.64%	44.36%
- County results Hruska: 50–60% 60–70% 70–80% Morrison: 50–60%
U.S. senator before election
Roman Hruska
Republican
Elected U.S. Senator
Roman Hruska
Republican

Democratic primary
Party	Candidate	Votes	%
Democratic	Frank B. Morrison	35,482	51.85
Democratic	Eugene D. O'Sullivan	26,436	38.63
Democratic	Mike F. Kracher	6,500	9.50
Democratic	Scattering	13	0.02
Total votes		68,431	100

Republican primary
Party	Candidate	Votes	%
Republican	Roman Hruska (Incumbent)	103,348	99.95
Republican	Scattering	51	0.05
Total votes		103,399	100

Nebraska general election 1958
Party	Candidate	Votes	%
Republican	Roman Hruska (Incumbent)	232,227	55.64%
Democratic	Frank B. Morrison	185,152	44.36%
N/A	Scattering	6	0.00%
Majority		47,075	11.18%
Turnout		417,385	
Republican hold			

Hruska would be re-elected two more times and serve until his 1976 retirement.

Morrison would be elected Governor of Nebraska in 1960 and serve there for six years from 1961 to 1967, and was re-elected twice while running unsuccessfully for U.S. senator.

== Nevada ==
1958 United States Senate election in Nevada
- November 4, 1958
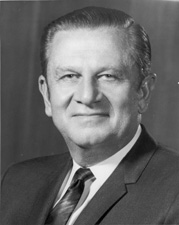

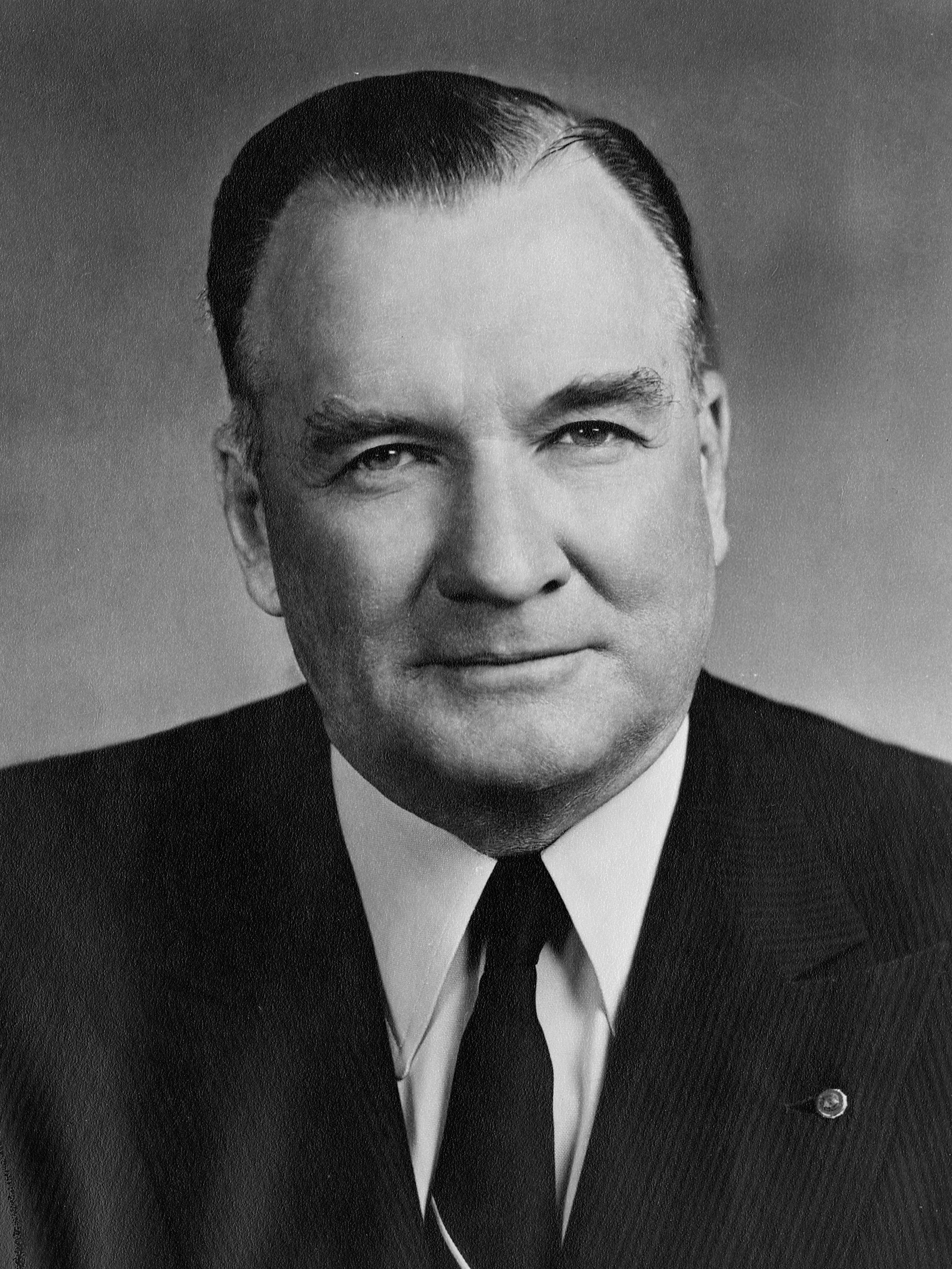
Nominee	Howard Cannon	George W. Malone
Party	Democratic	Republican
Popular vote	48,732	35,760
Percentage	57.65%	42.32%
- County results Cannon: 50–60% 70–80% Malone: 50–60% 60–70%
U.S. senator before election
George W. Malone
Republican
Elected U.S. Senator
Howard Cannon
Democratic

In Nevada, incumbent Republican George W. Malone ran for re-election to a third term, but was defeated by Democrat Howard Cannon.

The campaign was considered one of the most competitive and highly watched in the nation in 1958. Senator Malone was known nationally as a leader within the Republican Party's right wing and held key appointments on the Senate Finance and Interior Committees.

Malone campaigned on his experience and seniority in the Senate, using the slogan "He Knows Nevada Best." He received support from Eisenhower cabinet secretaries Fred Seaton and Ezra Taft Benson. Benson, one of the Twelve Apostles of the Church of Jesus Christ of Latter-Day Saints, was especially influential among Nevada's large Mormon population. His endorsement was seen as particularly important in light of Cannon's Mormon faith. Late in the campaign, Malone published full-page ads touting his effort to save Nevada from a federal gambling tax.

Cannon focused his attacks on Malone's absentee record in the Senate and his reputation on Capitol Hill as an unpopular extremist.

Cannon won the election by a safe margin owing to his overwhelming support in his native Clark County, which contained 47 percent of the state's registered voters. He was the first candidate from southern Nevada elected to the United States Senate.

Democratic primary
Party	Candidate	Votes	%
Democratic	Howard Cannon	22,787	51.66%
Democratic	Fred Anderson	21,319	48.34%
Total votes		44,106	

Senator Malone was unopposed for re-nomination by the Republican Party.

General election
Party	Candidate	Votes	%	±%
Democratic	Howard Cannon, City Attorney of Las Vegas	48,732	57.65%	▲7.63%
Republican	George W. Malone (Incumbent)	35,760	42.32%	▼9.35%
Majority		12,972	15.35%	▲12.00%
Turnout		84,492		
Democratic gain from Republican		Swing		

== New Jersey ==
New Jersey election
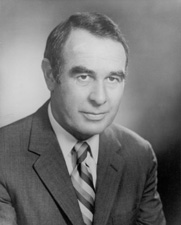

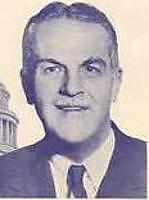
Nominee	Harrison Williams	Robert Kean
Party	Democratic	Republican
Popular vote	966,832	882,287
Percentage	51.39%	46.90%
- County results Williams: 40–50% 50–60% 60–70% Kean: 40-50% 50-60% 60-70%
U.S. senator before election
H. Alexander Smith
Republican
Elected U.S. senator
Harrison Williams
Democratic

Incumbent Republican H. Alexander Smith chose not to seek a third term in office. Democratic U.S. Representative Harrison Williams won the open seat over U.S. Representative Robert Kean.

Democratic primary
Party	Candidate	Votes	%
Democratic	Harrison A. Williams	152,413	43.12%
Democratic	John Grogan	139,605	39.49%
Democratic	Joseph E. McLean	61,478	17.39%
Total votes		353,496	100.00%

Republican primary
Party	Candidate	Votes	%
Republican	Robert Kean	152,884	43.00%
Republican	Bernard M. Shanley	128,990	36.28%
Republican	Robert J. Morris	73,658	20.72%
Total votes		355,532	100.00%

General election
Party	Candidate	Votes	%	±%
Democratic	Harrison A. Williams	966,832	51.39%	▲7.77
Republican	Robert Kean	882,287	46.90%	▼8.61
Socialist Workers	Daniel Roberts	11,669	0.62%	▲0.40
Politicians Are Jokers	Henry Krajewski	6,013	0.32%	N/A
Independent	John J. Winberry	5,481	0.29%	N/A
Conservative	Winifred O. Perry	3,062	0.16%	N/A
People's Choice	John M. D'Addetta	3,024	0.16%	N/A
Socialist Labor	Albert Ronis	2,935	0.16%	▲0.09
Total votes		1,881,303	100.00%	
Democratic gain from Republican				

== New Mexico ==
1958 United States Senate election in New Mexico
- November 4, 1958
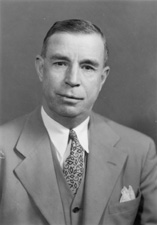

Nominee	Dennis Chávez	Forrest S. Atchley
Party	Democratic	Republican
Popular vote	127,496	75,827
Percentage	62.71%	37.29%
- County results Chávez: 50–60% 60–70% 70–80%
U.S. senator before election
Dennis Chávez
Democratic
Elected U.S. Senator
Dennis Chávez
Democratic

New Mexico general election 1958
Party	Candidate	Votes	%
Democratic	Dennis Chavez (Incumbent)	127,496	62.71%
Republican	Forrest S. Atchley	75,827	37.29%
Majority		51,669	25.42%
Turnout		203,323	
Democratic hold			

== New York ==
1958 United States Senate election in New York
- November 4, 1958
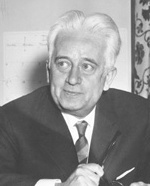

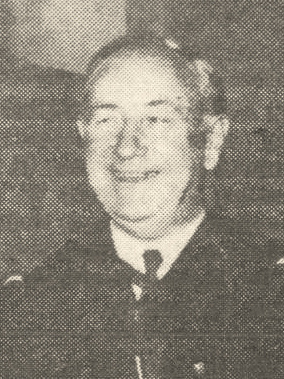
Nominee	Kenneth Keating	Frank Hogan
Party	Republican	Democratic
Alliance		Liberal
Popular vote	2,842,942	2,709,950
Percentage	50.75%	48.38%
- County results Keating: 50–60% 60–70% 70–80% Hogan: 50–60% 60–70%
Senator before election
Irving Ives
Republican
Elected Senator
Kenneth Keating
Republican

Incumbent Republican Irving Ives retired. Republican Representative Kenneth Keating defeated Democrat Frank Hogan to succeed Ives.

1958 Democratic Convention
Party	Candidate	Votes	%
Democratic	Frank Hogan	772	67.60%
Democratic	Thomas E. Murray Sr.	304	26.62%
Democratic	Thomas K. Finletter	66	5.78%
Total votes		1,317	100.00%

General election
Party	Candidate	Votes	%
Republican	Kenneth Keating	2,842,942	50.75%
Democratic	Frank Hogan	2,709,950	48.37%
Independent Socialist	Corliss Lamont	49,087	0.88%
None	Scattering	95	0.00%
Majority		132,992	2.38%
Turnout		5,601,979	
Republican hold			

== North Carolina (special) ==
1958 United States Senate special election in North Carolina
- November 4, 1958
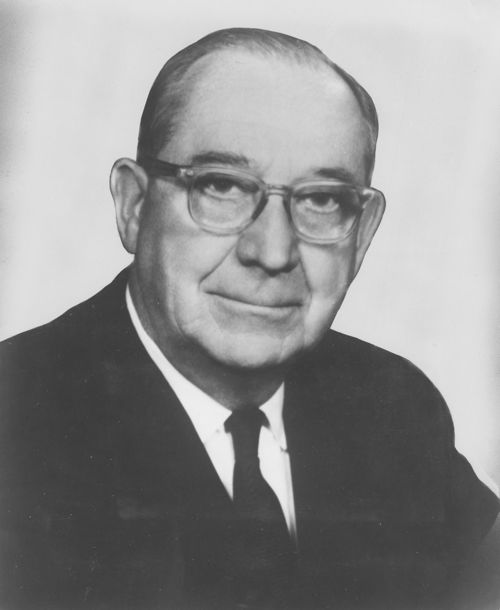

Nominee	B. Everett Jordan	Richard C. Clarke Jr.
Party	Democratic	Republican
Popular vote	431,492	184,977
Percentage	69.99%	30.01%
- County results Jordan: 50–60% 60–70% 70–80% 80–90% >90% Clarke: 50–60% 60–70% 70–80%
U.S. senator before election
B. Everett Jordan
Democratic
Elected U.S. Senator
B. Everett Jordan
Democratic

Democrat W. Kerr Scott had died April 16, 1958, and former Democratic Governor of North Carolina B. Everett Jordan was appointed April 19, 1958, to continue the term, pending a special election. Jordan was then re-elected in November.

General election
Party	Candidate	Votes	%
Democratic	B. Everett Jordan (incumbent)	431,492	70.0%
Republican	Richard C. Clarke Jr.	184,977	30.0%
Turnout			15.18%
Democratic hold			

Jordan would later be twice re-elected and serve until 1973.

== North Dakota ==
1958 United States Senate election in North Dakota
- November 4, 1958
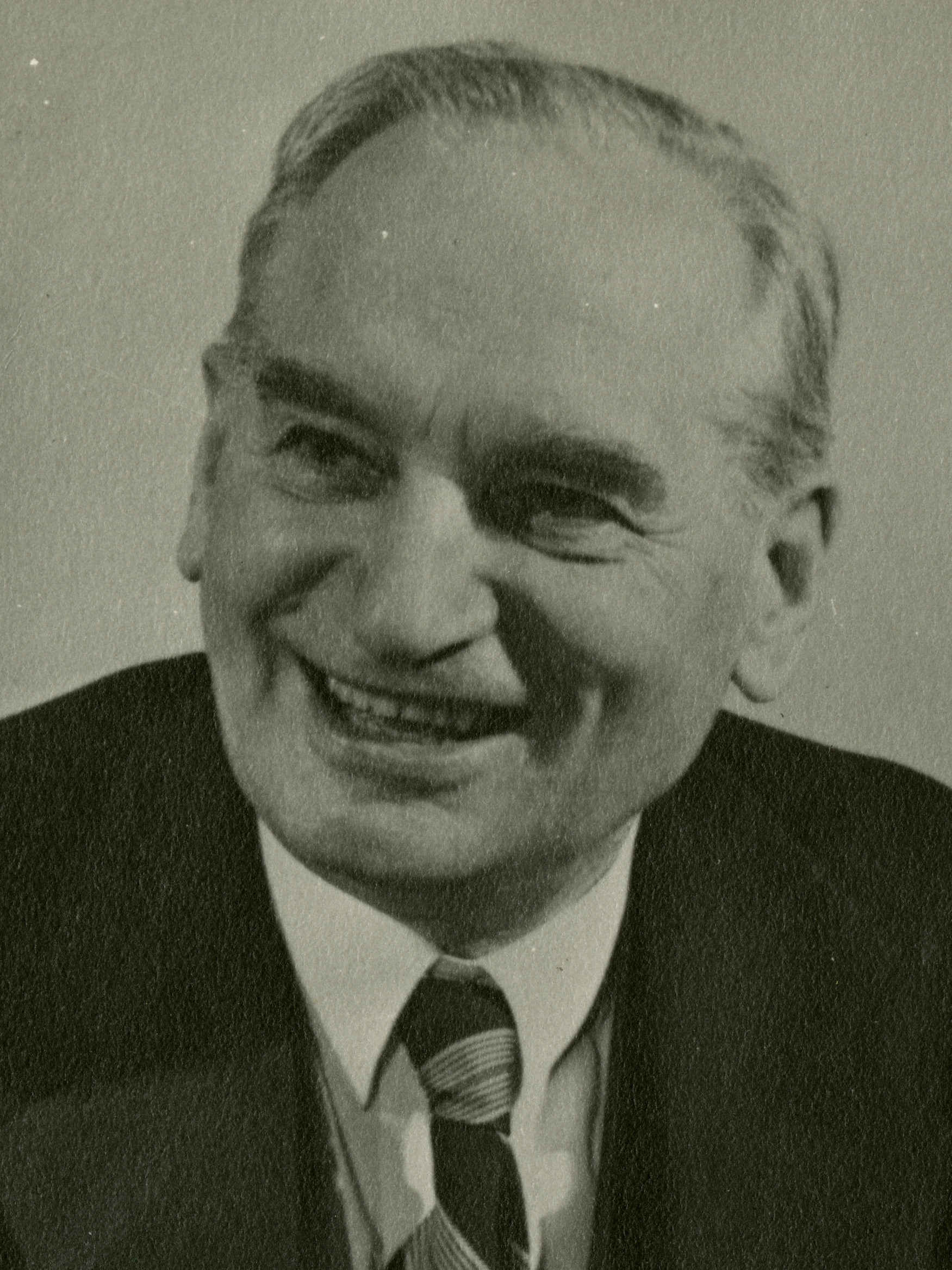

Nominee	William Langer	Raymond Vendsel
Party	Republican	Democratic–NPL
Popular vote	117,070	84,892
Percentage	57.21%	41.49%
- County results Langer: 50–60% 60–70% 70–80% 80–90% Vendsel: 40–50% 50–60% 60–70%
U.S. senator before election
William Langer
Republican
Elected U.S. Senator
William Langer
Republican

Incumbent Republican, and former Non-Partisan League (NPL) senator, William Langer, was re-elected to a fourth term, defeating North Dakota Democratic NPL Party (Dem-NPL) candidate Raymond G. Vendsel.

Only Langer filed as a Republican, and the endorsed Democratic-NPL candidate was Raymond G. Vendsel. Langer and Vendsel won the primary elections for their respective parties.

Two independent candidates, Arthur C. Townley and Custer Solem, also filed before the deadline but had minimal impact on the outcome of the election, totaling less than 3,000 votes combined. Townley was known as the creator of the National Non-Partisan League, and had previously sought North Dakota's other senate seat in 1956.

North Dakota election
Party	Candidate	Votes	%
Republican	William Langer (Incumbent)	117,070	57.21%
Democratic–NPL	Raymond G. Vendsel	84,892	41.49%
Independent	Arthur C. Townley	1,700	0.83%
Independent	Custer Solem	973	0.48%
Majority		32,178	15.72%
Turnout		204,635	
Republican hold			

Langer would die in office less than a year into what became his final term. A special election was held in 1960 triggered by Langer's death.

== Ohio ==
1958 United States Senate election in Ohio
- November 4, 1958
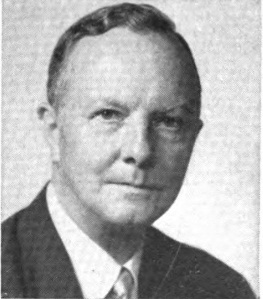

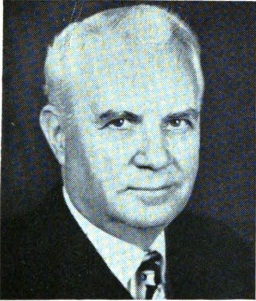
Nominee	Stephen M. Young	John W. Bricker
Party	Democratic	Republican
Popular vote	1,652,211	1,497,199
Percentage	52.46%	47.54%
- County results Young: 50–60% 60–70% Bricker: 50–60% 60–70%
U.S. senator before election
John W. Bricker
Republican
Elected U.S. Senator
Stephen M. Young
Democratic

Incumbent Republican John W. Bricker was defeated in his bid for a third term by U.S. Representative Stephen M. Young.

General election
Party	Candidate	Votes	%	±%
Democratic	Stephen M. Young	1,652,211	52.46%	▲7.04
Republican	John W. Bricker (Incumbent)	1,497,199	47.54%	▼7.05
Majority		155,012	4.92%	
Turnout		3,149,410		
Democratic gain from Republican				

== Pennsylvania ==
1958 United States Senate election in Pennsylvania
- November 4, 1958
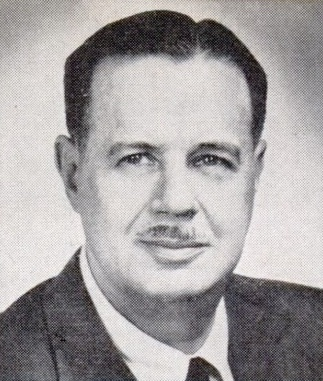

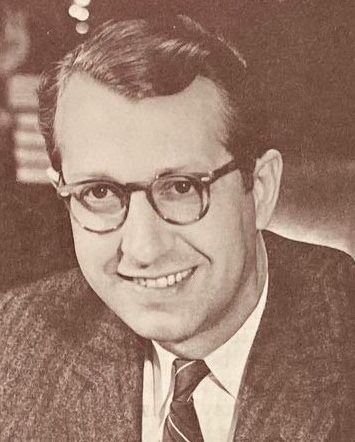
Nominee	Hugh Scott	George M. Leader
Party	Republican	Democratic
Popular vote	2,042,586	1,929,821
Percentage	51.21%	48.38%
- County results Scott: 40-50% 50-60% 60-70% 70–80% Leader: 40–50% 50–60%
U.S. senator before election
Edward Martin
Republican
Elected U.S. Senator
Hugh Scott
Republican

Incumbent Republican Edward Martin did not seek re-election. The Republican nominee, Hugh Scott, defeated the term-limited Democratic Governor of Pennsylvania George M. Leader for the vacant seat.

General election
Party	Candidate	Votes	%	±%
Republican	Hugh Scott	2,042,586	51.21%	▼0.37%
Democratic	George M. Leader	1,929,821	48.38%	▲0.40%
Socialist Labor	George S. Taylor	10,431	0.26%	▲0.26%
Socialist Workers	Ethel Peterson	5,742	0.14%	▲0.14%
N/A	Other	42	0.00%	N/A
Majority		112,765	2.83%	
Turnout		3,988,622		
Republican hold		Swing		

Scott would be twice re-elected, rising to the Senate Minority leader, and serve until retiring in 1977. Leader retired from public service after the defeat.

== Rhode Island ==
1958 United States Senate election in Rhode Island
- November 4, 1958
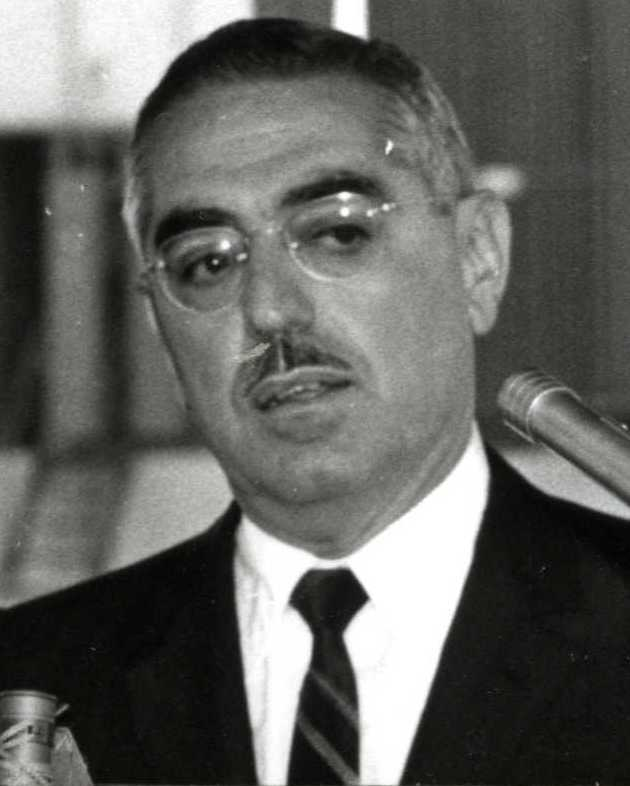

Nominee	John Pastore	Bayard Ewing
Party	Democratic	Republican
Popular vote	222,166	122,353
Percentage	64.49%	35.51%
- Pastore: 50–60% 60–70% 70–80% Ewing: 50–60% 60–70% Tie: 50%
U.S. senator before election
John Pastore
Democratic
Elected U.S. Senator
John Pastore
Democratic

Two-term incumbent Democrat John Pastore was easily re-elected over Republican attorney Bayard Ewing, a repeat of their 1952 race.

Rhode Island general election 1958
Party	Candidate	Votes	%
Democratic	John Pastore (Incumbent)	222,166	64.49%
Republican	Bayard Ewing	122,353	35.51%
Majority		99,813	28.98%
Turnout		344,519	
Democratic hold			

Ewing would later serve as the national chairman of the United Way (1969–1972) and the Rhode Island School of Design (1967–1985).

== Tennessee ==
1958 United States Senate election in Tennessee
- November 4, 1958
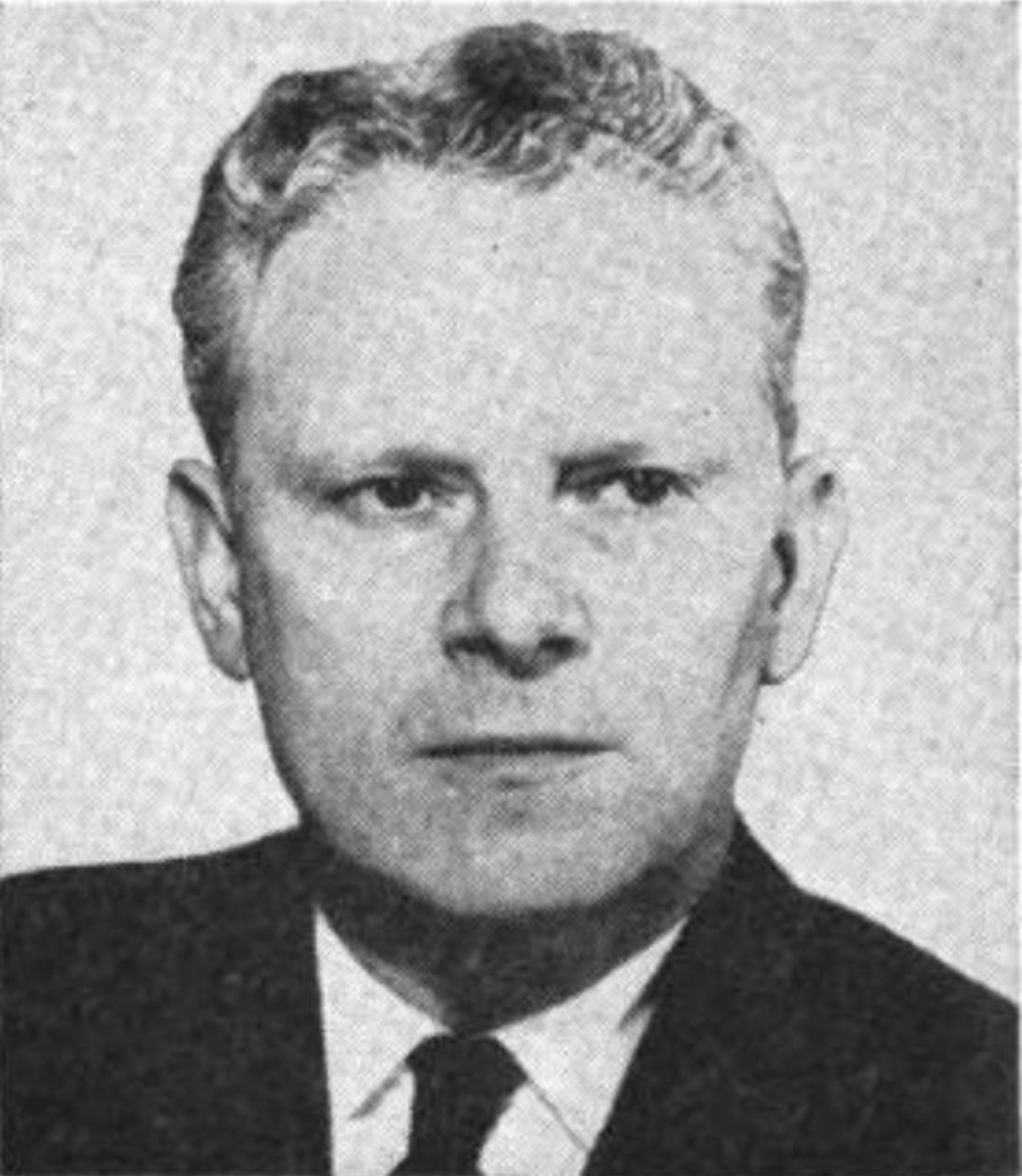

Nominee	Albert Gore Sr.	Hobart F. Atkins
Party	Democratic	Republican
Popular vote	317,324	76,371
Percentage	79.00%	19.01%
- County results Gore: 40–50% 50–60% 60–70% 70–80% 80–90% >90% Atkins: 50–60%
U.S. senator before election
Albert Gore Sr.
Democratic
Elected U.S. senator
Albert Gore Sr.
Democratic

Tennessee general election 1958
Party	Candidate	Votes	%
Democratic	Albert Gore Sr. (Incumbent)	317,324	79.00%
Republican	Hobart F. Atkins	76,371	19.01%
Write-In	Chester W. Mason	5,324	1.33%
Write-In	Thomas Gouge Jr.	2,646	0.66%
Majority		240,953	59.99%
Turnout		401,665	
Democratic hold			

== Texas ==
1958 United States Senate election in Texas
- November 4, 1958
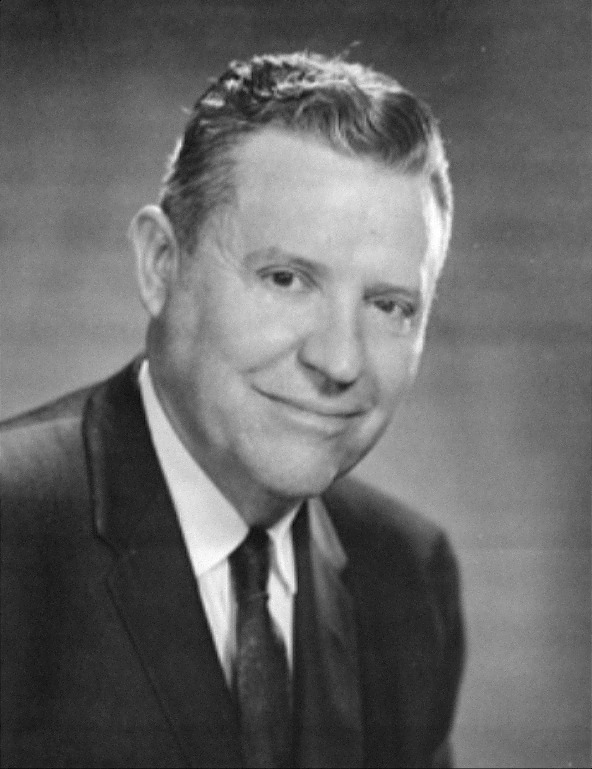

Nominee	Ralph Yarborough	Roy Whittenburg
Party	Democratic	Republican
Popular vote	587,030	185,926
Percentage	74.58%	23.62%
- County Results; Yarborough: 50–60% 60–70% 70–80% 80–90% >90% Whittenburg: 50–60% Tie: 50%
U.S. senator before election
Ralph Yarborough
Democratic
Elected U.S. Senator
Ralph Yarborough
Democratic

Texas general election 1958
Party	Candidate	Votes	%
Democratic	Ralph Yarborough (Incumbent)	587,030	74.58%
Republican	Roy Whittenburg	185,926	23.62%
Write-In	Bard W. Logan	14,172	1.80%
Majority		401,104	50.96%
Turnout		787,128	
Democratic hold			

== Utah ==
1958 United States Senate election in Utah
- November 4, 1958
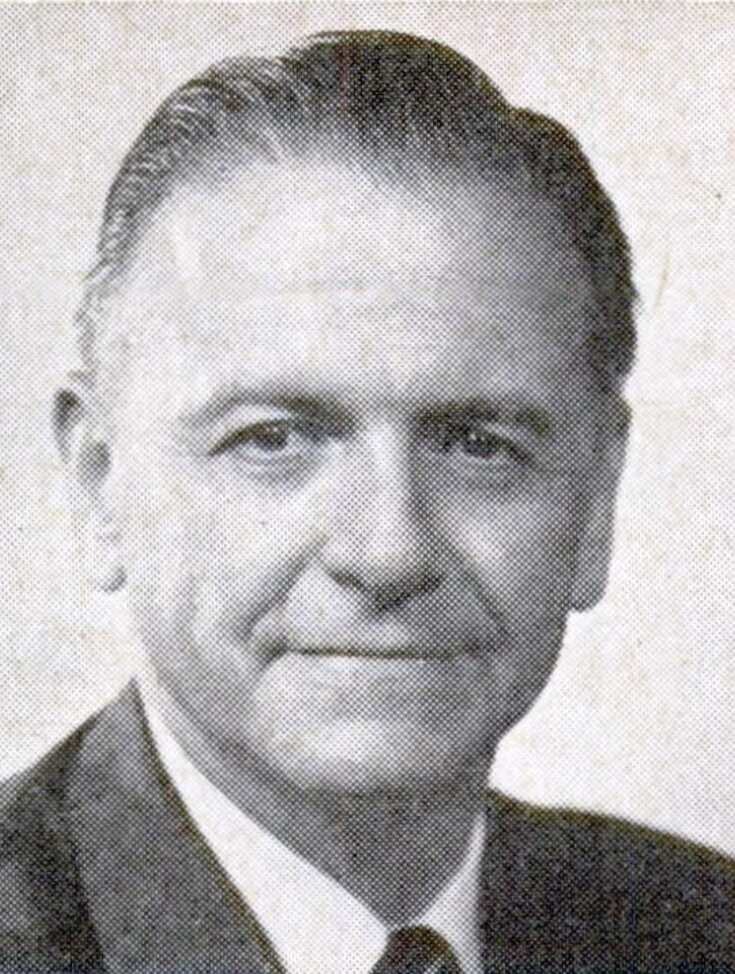

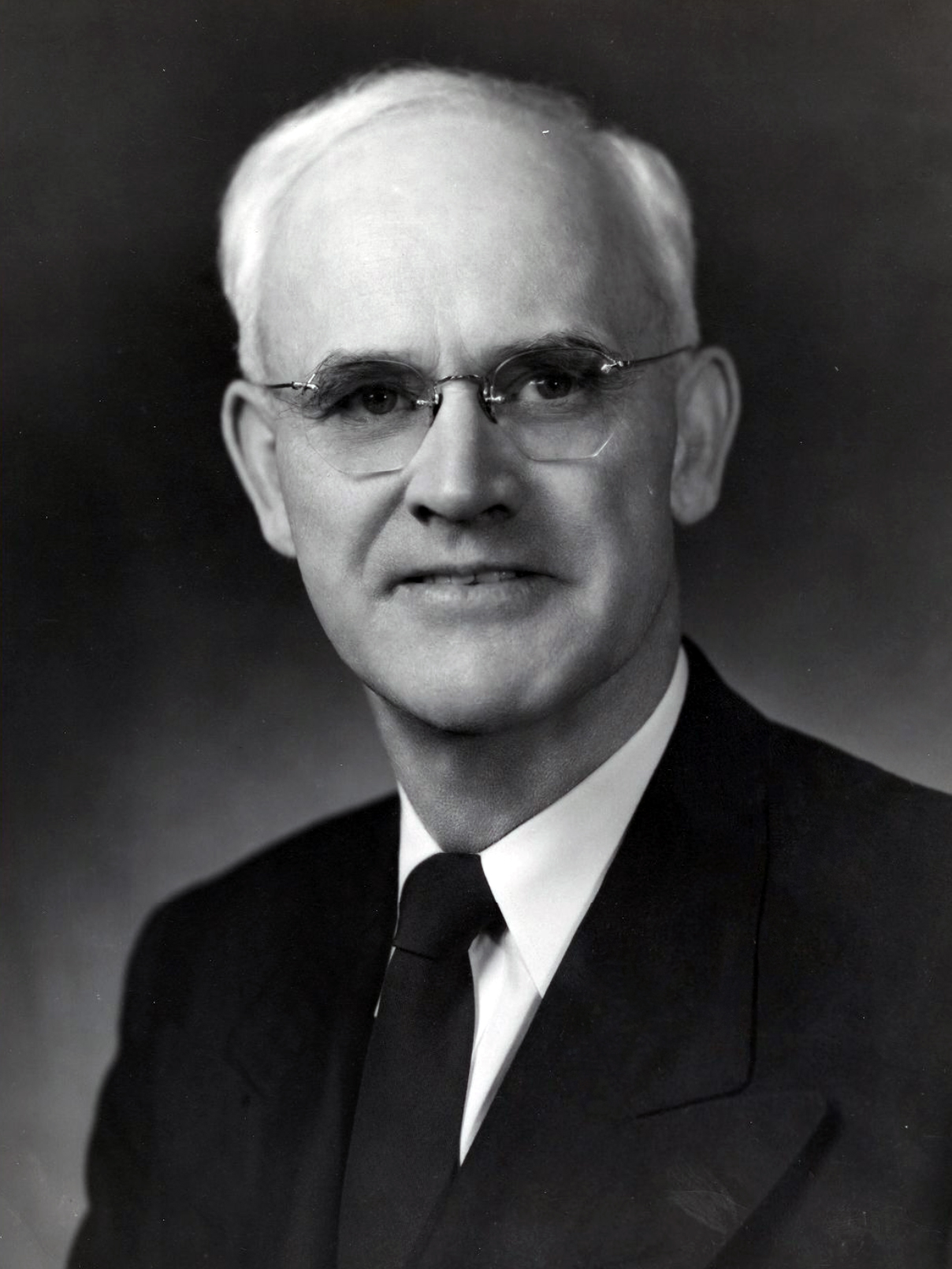

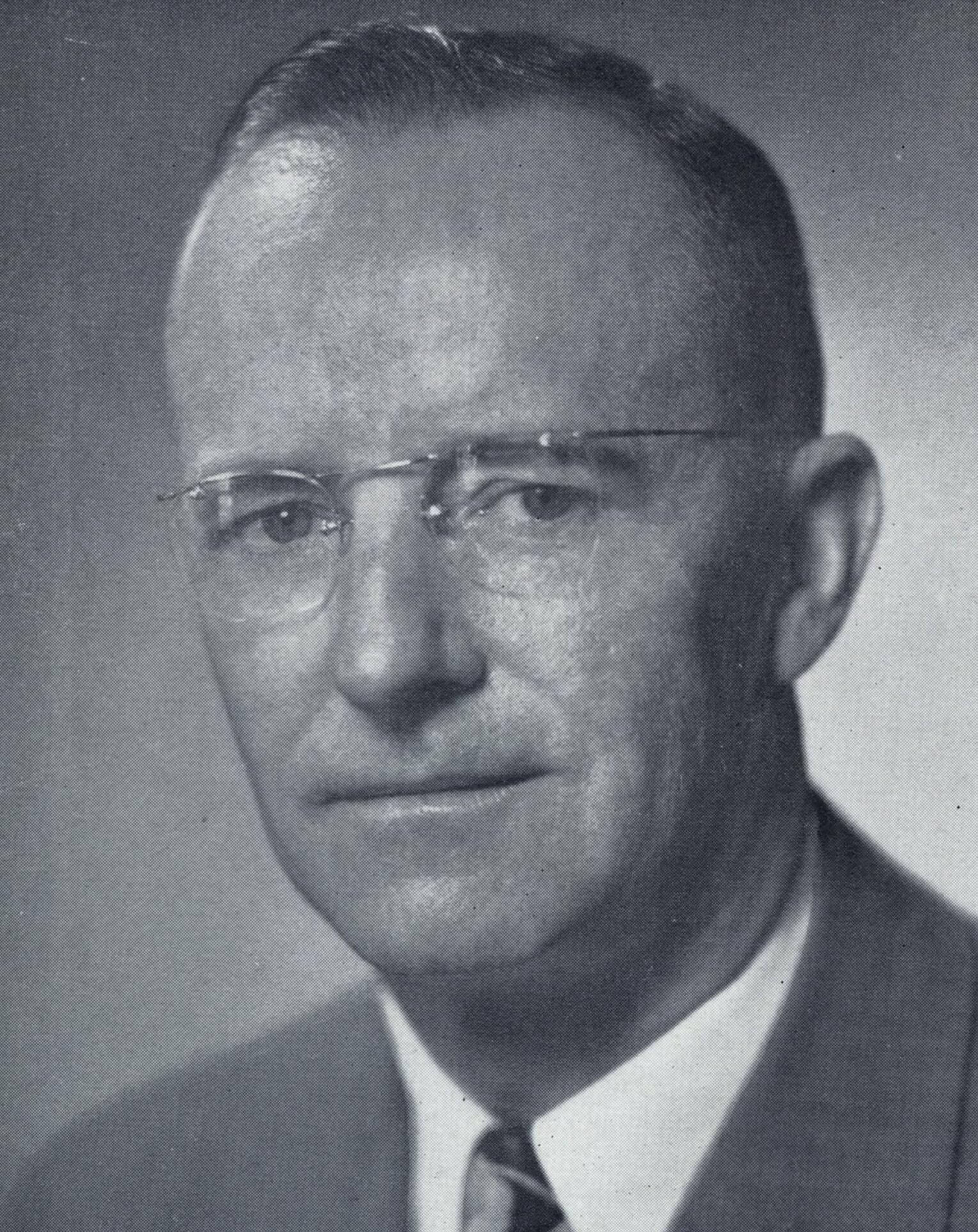
Nominee	Frank Moss	Arthur V. Watkins	J. Bracken Lee
Party	Democratic	Republican	Independent
Popular vote	112,827	101,471	77,013
Percentage	38.73%	34.83%	26.44%
- County results Moss: 30–40% 40–50% 50–60% Watkins: 30–40% 40–50% 50–60% Lee: 40–50% 60–70%
U.S. senator before election
Arthur V. Watkins
Republican
Elected U.S. Senator
Frank Moss
Democratic

Utah general election 1958
Party	Candidate	Votes	%
Democratic	Frank Moss	112,827	38.73%
Republican	Arthur V. Watkins (Incumbent)	101,471	34.83%
Independent	J. Bracken Lee	77,013	26.44%
Majority		11,356	3.90%
Turnout		291,311	
Democratic gain from Republican			

== Vermont ==
1958 United States Senate election in Vermont
- November 4, 1958
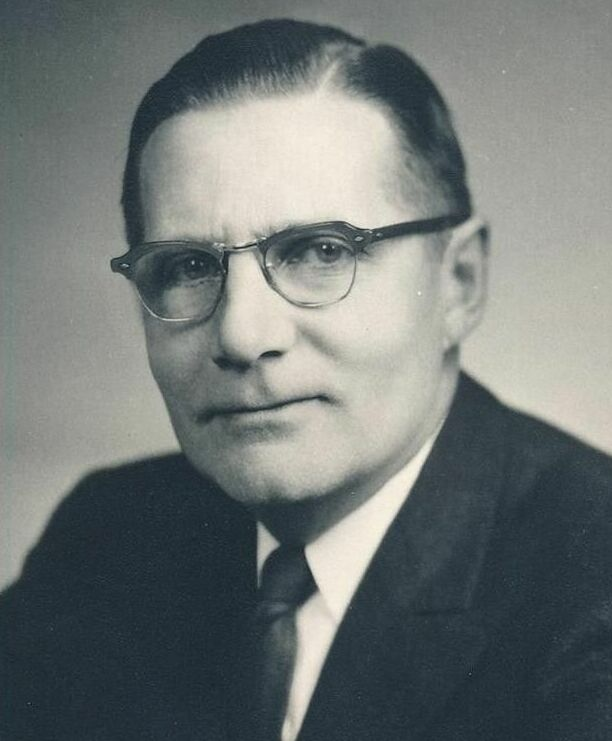

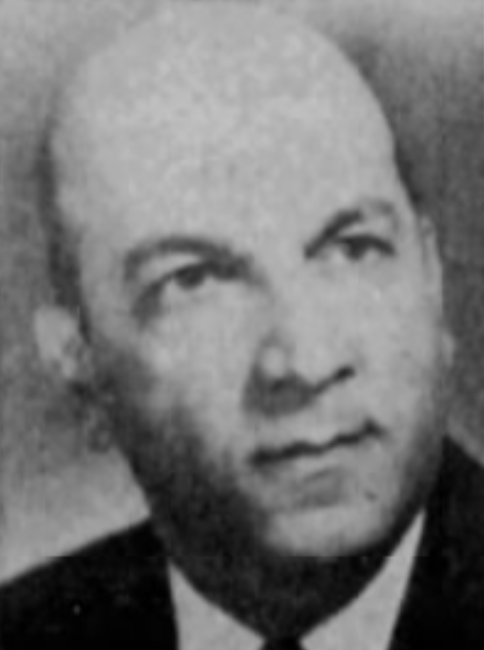
Nominee	Winston L. Prouty	Frederick Fayette
Party	Republican	Democratic
Popular vote	64,900	59,536
Percentage	52.15%	47.84%
- County results Prouty: 50–60% 60–70% Fayette: 50–60% 60–70%
U.S. senator before election
Ralph Flanders
Republican
Elected U.S. Senator
Winston L. Prouty
Republican

Incumbent Republican Ralph Flanders did not run for re-election to another term in the United States Senate. Republican candidate Winston L. Prouty defeated Democratic candidate Frederick J. Fayette to succeed him.

Republican primary
Party	Candidate	Votes	%	±%
Republican	Winston L. Prouty	31,866	64.6%	
Republican	Lee E. Emerson	17,468	35.4%	
Republican	Other	4	0.0%	
Total votes		49,338	100.00%	

Democratic primary
Party	Candidate	Votes	%
Democratic	Frederick J. Fayette	6,546	99.5%
Democratic	Other	32	0.5%
Total votes		6,578	100.00%

General election
Party	Candidate	Votes	%
Republican	Winston L. Prouty	64,900	52.15%
Democratic	Frederick J. Fayette	59,536	47.84%
N/A	Other	6	0.00%
Majority		5,364	4.31%
Total votes		124,442	100.00%
Republican hold			

== Virginia ==
Virginia election
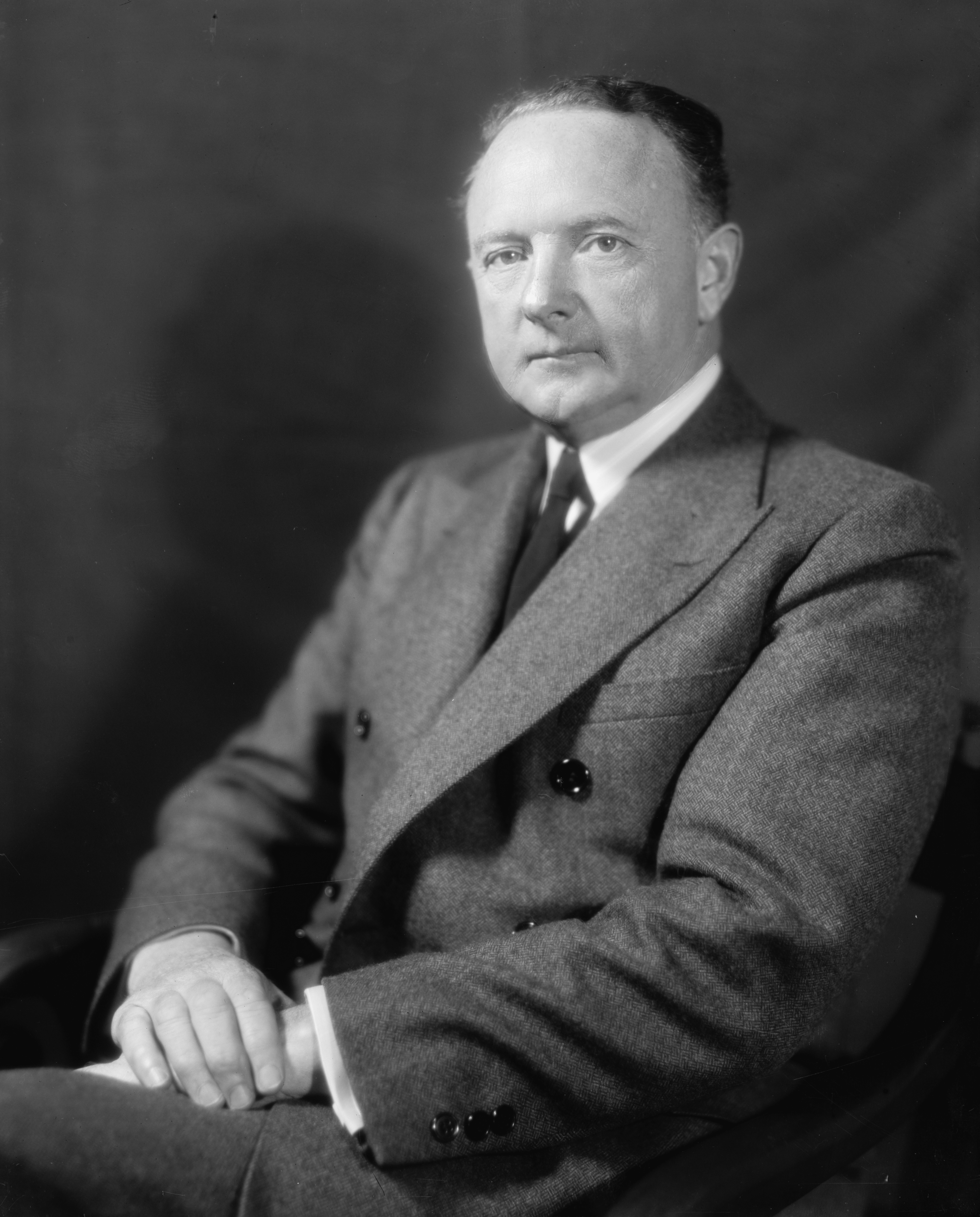

Nominee	Harry F. Byrd	Louise Wensel
Party	Democratic	Independent
Popular vote	317,221	120,224
Percentage	69.3%	26.3%
- County and Independent City Results Byrd: 40-50% 50-60% 60-70% 70-80% 80-90% 90-100% Wensel: 40-50% 60-70%
U.S. senator before election
Harry F. Byrd
Democratic
Elected U.S. senator
Harry F. Byrd
Democratic

Incumbent Harry F. Byrd Sr. was re-elected after defeating Independent Louise Wensel and Social Democrat Clarke Robb.

General election
Party	Candidate	Votes	%	±%
Democratic	Harry F. Byrd (Incumbent)	317,221	69.32%	▼4.03%
Independent	Louise Wensel	120,224	26.27%	▲26.27%
Social Democratic	Clarke T. Robb	20,154	4.40%	▼7.98%
Write-in	write-ins	41	0.01%	▼1.54%
Majority		196,997	43.05%	
Turnout		457,640		
Democratic hold				

== Washington ==
1958 United States Senate election in Washington
- November 4, 1958
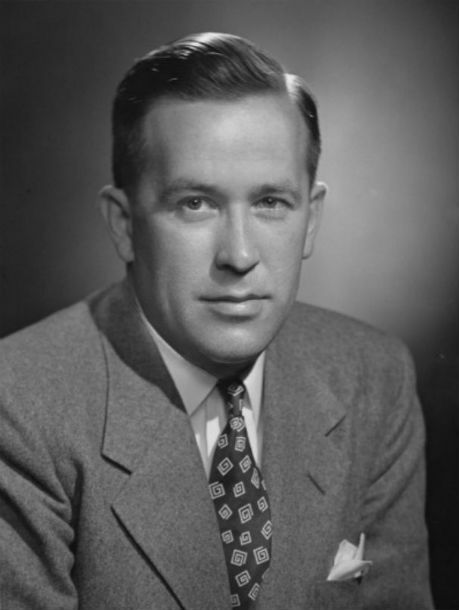
Nominee	Henry M. Jackson	William B. Bantz
Party	Democratic	Republican
Popular vote	597,040	278,271
Percentage	67.32%	31.38%
- County results Jackson: 50–60% 60–70% 70–80% 80–90%
U.S. senator before election
Henry M. Jackson
Democratic
Elected U.S. Senator
Henry M. Jackson
Democratic

Washington general election 1958
Party	Candidate	Votes	%
Democratic	Henry M. Jackson (Incumbent)	597,040	67.32%
Republican	William B. Bantz	278,271	31.38%
Socialist Labor	Henry Killman	7,592	0.86%
Constitution	Archie G. Idso	2,257	0.25%
United Liberals and Socialists	Jay G. Sykes	1,662	0.19%
Majority		318,769	35.94%
Turnout		886,822	
Democratic hold			

== West Virginia ==
=== West Virginia (regular) ===
West Virginia election
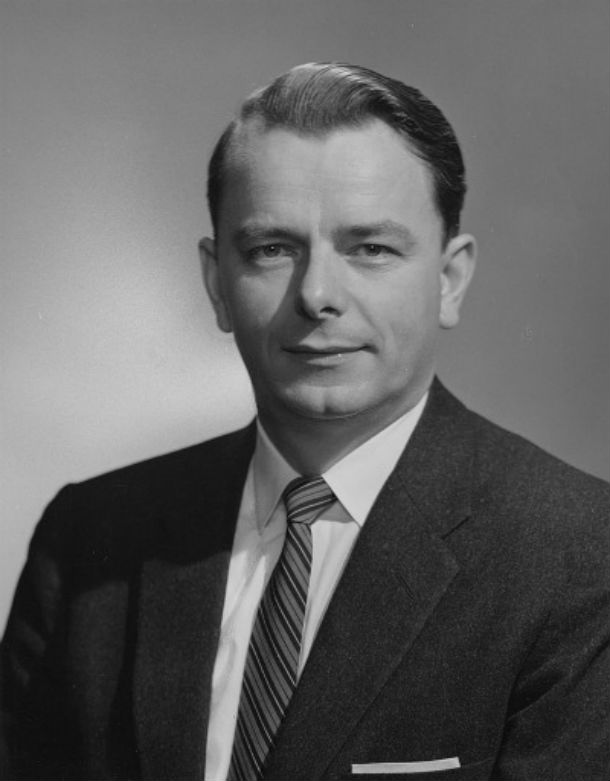

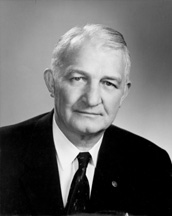
Nominee	Robert Byrd	William Revercomb
Party	Democratic	Republican
Popular vote	381,745	263,172
Percentage	59.19%	40.81%
- County results Byrd: 50–60% 60–70% 70–80% Revercomb: 50–60% 60–70% 70–80%
U.S. senator before election
William Revercomb
Republican
Elected U.S. Senator
Robert Byrd
Democratic

In 1956, senator Harley M. Kilgore died, and former senator William Revercomb won his seat in the 1956 special election. Revercomb sought re-election to a third term, but was defeated by Congressman Robert Byrd. This election was the beginning of Byrd's lifelong career in the Senate.

1958 United States Senate election in West Virginia
Party	Candidate	Votes	%	±%
Democratic	Robert Byrd	381,745	59.19%	+18.39%
Republican	William Revercomb (Incumbent)	263,172	40.81%	−18.39%
Total votes		644,917	100.00%	-21.5%
Democratic gain from Republican				

=== West Virginia (special) ===
1958 United States Senate special election in West Virginia
- November 4, 1958
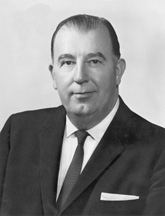

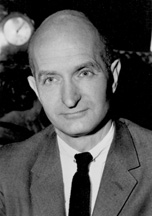
Nominee	Jennings Randolph	John D. Hoblitzell Jr.
Party	Democratic	Republican
Popular vote	374,167	256,510
Percentage	59.32%	39.77%
- County results Randolph: 50–60% 60–70% 70–80% Hoblitzell: 50–60% 60–70% 70–80%
U.S. senator before election
John D. Hoblitzell Jr.
Republican
Elected U.S. Senator
Jennings Randolph
Democratic

Incumbent Democrat Matthew M. Neely died of cancer January 8, 1958, and Republican John D. Hoblitzell Jr. was appointed January 25, 1958, to continue the term, pending a special election.

Former Democratic congressman Jennings Randolph was elected to finish the term that would run through 1961.

West Virginia special election
Party	Candidate	Votes	%
Democratic	Jennings Randolph	374,167	59.32%
Republican	John D. Hoblitzell Jr. (Incumbent)	256,510	39.77%
Total votes		630,677	100%

Randolph would be re-elected four times and serve until his retirement in 1985. Hoblitzell resumed his business interests and died January 6, 1962.

== Wisconsin ==
1958 United States Senate election in Wisconsin
- November 4, 1958
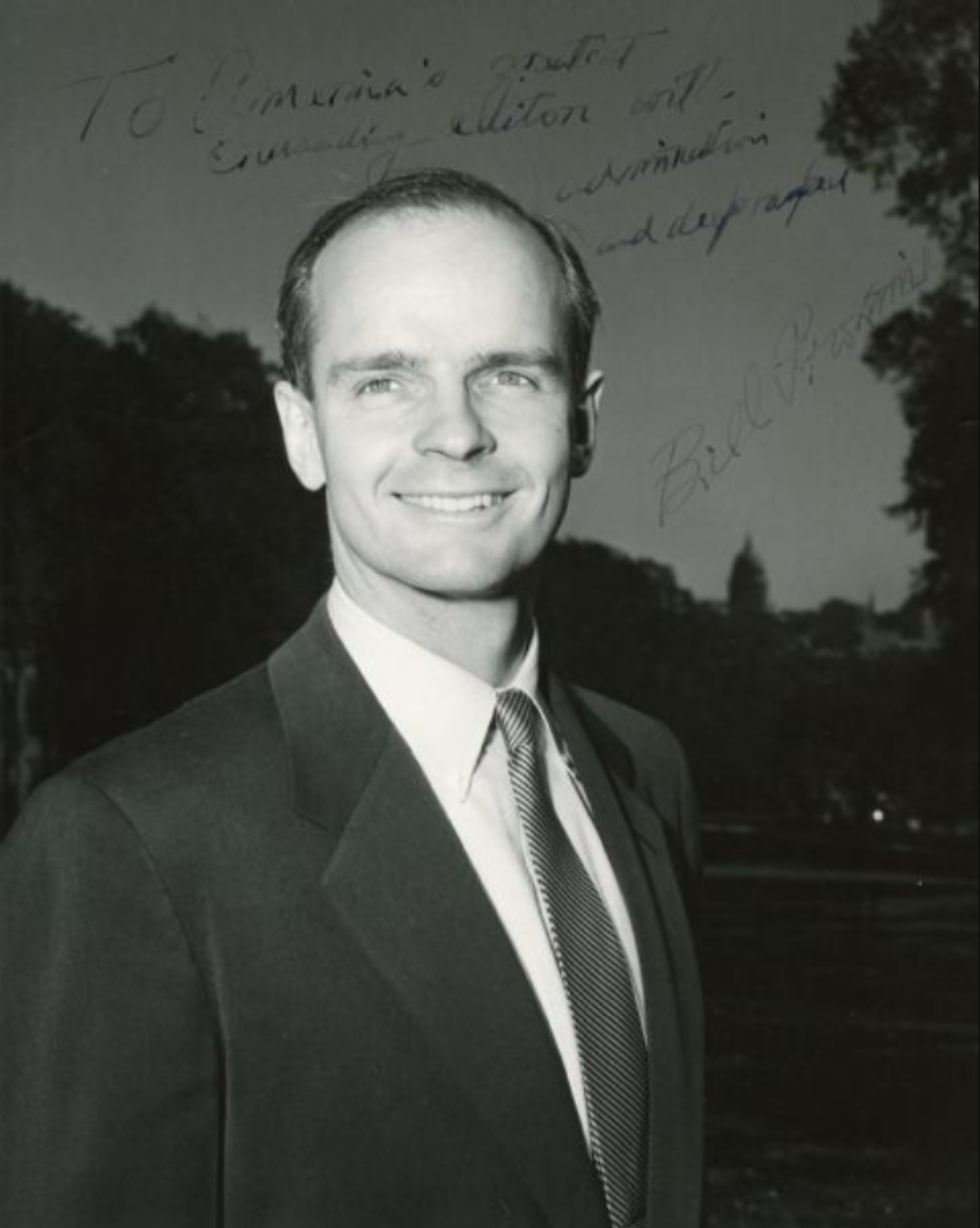
Nominee	William Proxmire	Roland J. Steinle
Party	Democratic	Republican
Popular vote	682,440	510,398
Percentage	57.13%	42.73%
- County Results Proxmire: 50–60% 60–70% 70–80% Kohler: 50–60% 60–70%
U.S. senator before election
William Proxmire
Democratic
Elected U.S. Senator
William Proxmire
Democratic

Wisconsin general election 1958
Party	Candidate	Votes	%
Democratic	William Proxmire (Incumbent)	682,440	57.12%
Republican	Roland J. Steinle	510,398	42.72%
Socialist Workers	James E. Boulton	1,226	0.10%
Socialist Labor	Georgia Cozzini	537	0.04%
None	Scattering	77	0.01%
Majority		171,042	14.40%
Turnout		1,194,678	
Democratic hold			

== Wyoming ==
1958 United States Senate election in Wyoming
- November 4, 1958
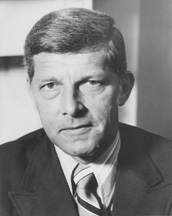

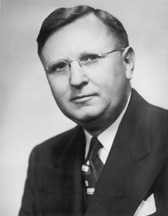
Nominee	Gale W. McGee	Frank A. Barrett
Party	Democratic	Republican
Popular vote	58,035	56,122
Percentage	50.84%	49.16%
- County results McGee: 50–60% 60–70% 70–80% Barrett: 50–60% 60–70%
U.S. senator before election
Frank A. Barrett
Republican
Elected U.S. Senator
Gale W. McGee
Democratic

Wyoming general election 1958
Party	Candidate	Votes	%
Democratic	Gale McGee	58,035	50.84%
Republican	Frank A. Barrett (Incumbent)	56,122	49.16%
Majority		1,913	1.68%
Turnout		114,157	
Democratic gain from Republican			

== See also ==
- 1958 United States elections
  - 1958 United States gubernatorial elections
  - 1958 United States House of Representatives elections
- 85th United States Congress
- 86th United States Congress
