= 1958 United States Senate election in New Mexico =

- November 4, 1958
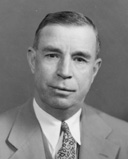

Nominee	Dennis Chávez	Forrest S. Atchley
Party	Democratic	Republican
Popular vote	127,496	75,827
Percentage	62.71%	37.29%
- County results Chávez: 50–60% 60–70% 70–80%
U.S. senator before election
Dennis Chávez
Democratic
Elected U.S. Senator
Dennis Chávez
Democratic

The 1958 United States Senate election in New Mexico took place on November 4, 1958. Incumbent Democratic Senator Dennis Chávez won re-election to a fifth term.

== Primary elections ==
Primary elections were held on May 13, 1958.

=== Democratic primary ===
==== Candidates ====
- Dennis Chávez, incumbent U.S. Senator
- E. S. Johnny Walker, former State Land Commissioner

==== Results ====
Democratic primary results
Party	Candidate	Votes	%
Democratic	Dennis Chávez (Incumbent)	68,689	65.66
Democratic	E. S. Johnny Walker	35,927	34.34
Total votes		104,616	

=== Republican primary ===
==== Candidates ====
- Forrest S. Atchley, former State Representative, Republican nominee for New Mexico's at-large congressional district in 1956
- Reginaldo Espinoza, former State Senator

==== Results ====
Republican primary results
Party	Candidate	Votes	%
Republican	Forrest S. Atchley	10,384	51.29
Republican	Reginaldo Espinoza	9,861	48.71
Total votes		20,245	

== General election ==
=== Results ===
1958 United States Senate election in New Mexico
Party	Candidate	Votes	%
Democratic	Dennis Chávez (Incumbent)	127,496	62.71
Republican	Forrest S. Atchley	75,827	37.29
Majority		51,669	25.42
Turnout		203,323	
Democratic hold			

== See also ==
- 1958 United States Senate elections

== Bibliography ==
- Congressional Elections, 1946-1996. Washington, D.C.: Congressional Quarterly Inc. 1998. ISBN 1-56802-248-4.
