= Forrest S. Atchley =

American politician (1909–1999)

Member of the New Mexico House of Representatives
- In office 1949–1958

Personal details
- Born: August 12, 1909 Carmen, Oklahoma, U.S.
- Died: March 24, 1999 (aged 89) Amarillo, Texas, U.S.
- Party: Republican

Forrest S. Atchley (August 12, 1909 – March 24, 1999) was an American politician. He served as a Republican member of the New Mexico House of Representatives.

== Life and career ==
Atchley was born in Carmen, Oklahoma. He was a rancher.

Atchley served three terms in the New Mexico House of Representatives during the late 1940s and 1950s.

Atchley died on March 24, 1999, in Amarillo, Texas, at the age of 89.
