= 1956 United States Senate special election in West Virginia =

- November 6, 1956
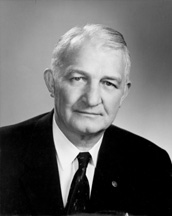

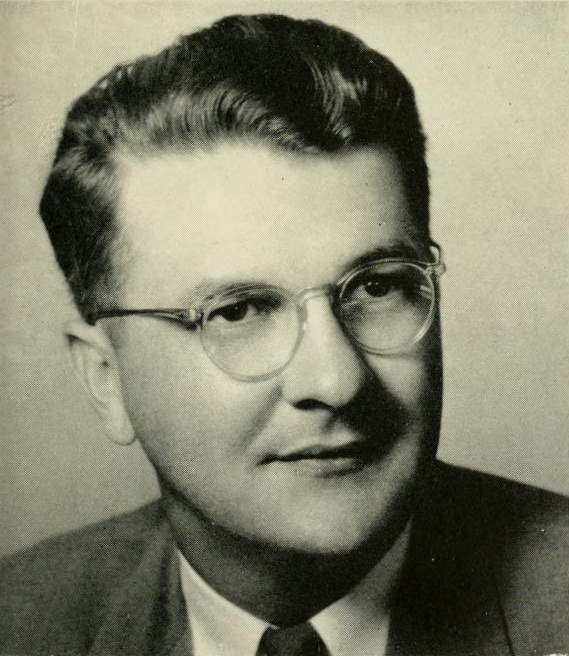
Nominee	Chapman Revercomb	William C. Marland
Party	Republican	Democratic
Popular vote	432,123	373,051
Percentage	53.67%	46.33%
- County results Revercomb: 50–60% 60–70% 70–80% 80–90% Marland: 50–60% 60–70%
U.S. senator before election
William Laird III
Democratic
Elected U.S. Senator
Chapman Revercomb
Republican

The 1956 United States Senate special election in West Virginia took place on November 6, 1956, to elect a U.S. Senator to complete the unexpired term of Senator Harley M. Kilgore, who died on February 28. 1956. State Tax Commissioner William Laird III was appointed to fill this seat by Governor William C. Marland to fill the vacancy until a special election could be held and assumed office on March 13, 1956.

Laird did not opt to run in the special election to fill the remainder of Kilgore's term through the end of the 85th Congress on January 3, 1959. Republican candidate former Senator Chapman Revercomb defeated the Democratic candidate Governor Marland in the special election.

This was the last time the Republicans won West Virginia's Class 1 seat, until Jim Justice flipped the seat in 2024. This was also the last time until 2014 that the Republicans won a U.S. Senate election in the state.

== Primary elections ==
Primary elections were held on May 8, 1956.

=== Democratic primary ===
==== Candidates ====
- Joseph Arcuri, children's writer
- Walter G. Crichton, Charleston councilman, unsuccessful candidate for Democratic nomination for West Virginia's 6th congressional district in 1944
- John G. Fox, incumbent Attorney General of West Virginia
- William C. Marland, incumbent Governor of West Virginia
- Byron B. Randolph, former President of the West Virginia Senate

==== Results ====
Democratic primary results
Party	Candidate	Votes	%
Democratic	William C. Marland	118,159	37.25
Democratic	John G. Fox	104,869	33.06
Democratic	Byron B. Randolph	56,945	17.95
Democratic	Walter G. Crichton	26,972	8.50
Democratic	Joseph Arcuri	10,263	3.24
Total votes		317,208	100.00

=== Republican primary ===
==== Candidates ====
- Chapman Revercomb, former U.S. Senator
- Thomas Sweeney, insurance agent, Republican candidate for U.S. Senator in 1940, 1946 and 1954
- Philip H. Hill, attorney, Republican candidate for Attorney General of West Virginia in 1936
- Al J. Carey, Kanawha County Sheriff
- Esta C. Wilson, television dealer

==== Results ====
Republican primary results
Party	Candidate	Votes	%
Republican	Chapman Revercomb	79,106	41.53
Republican	Thomas Sweeney	57,556	30.22
Republican	Philip H. Hill	37,574	19.73
Republican	Al J. Carey	11,268	5.92
Republican	Esta C. Wilson	4,971	2.61
Total votes		190,475	100.00

== General election ==
=== Results ===
1956 United States Senate special election in West Virginia
Party	Candidate	Votes	%
Republican	Chapman Revercomb	432,123	53.67
Democratic	William C. Marland	373,051	46.33
Majority		59,072	7.34
Turnout		805,174	
Republican gain from Democratic			

== See also ==
- 1956 United States Senate elections

== Bibliography ==
- Congressional Elections, 1946-1996. Washington, D.C.: Congressional Quarterly Inc. 1998. ISBN 1-56802-248-4.
- Myers, J. Howard (ed.). West Virginia Blue Book 1956 (PDF). Vol. 40. Charleston, West Virginia: Jarrett Printing Company.
