= 84th United States Congress =

1955–1957 U.S. Congress

| ← | 83rd | 85th | → |
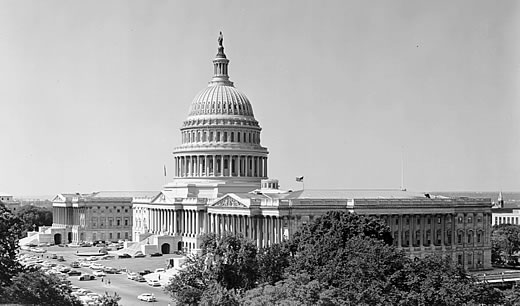
- United States Capitol (1956)

Overview
- Legislative body: United States Congress
- Jurisdiction: United States
- Term: January 3, 1955 – January 3, 1957

Senate
- Members: 96
- President: Richard Nixon (R)
- President pro tempore: Walter F. George (D)
- Party control: Democratic (initially with caucus)

House of Representatives
- Members: 435 representatives 3 non-voting delegates
- Speaker: Sam Rayburn (D)
- Party control: Democratic

Sessions
- 1st: January 5, 1955 – August 2, 1955
- 2nd: January 3, 1956 – July 27, 1956

The 84th United States Congress was a meeting of the legislative branch of the United States federal government, composed of the United States Senate and the United States House of Representatives. It met in Washington, D.C. from January 3, 1955, to January 3, 1957, during the third and fourth years of Dwight D. Eisenhower's presidency. The apportionment of seats in the House of Representatives was based on the 1950 United States census.

The Democratic Party won back majorities in both the House and Senate, thus giving them full control of Congress, although Republican Party briefly won the Senate after the last congressional session. The Democratic Party continued to hold onto its house majority until the 104th Congress.

== Major events ==
- January 28, 1955: Congress authorized the president to use force to protect Taiwan from the People's Republic of China.
- February 10, 1955: The United States Navy helped the Republic of China evacuate Chinese Nationalist army and residents from the Tachen Islands to Taiwan.
- February 12, 1955: President Eisenhower sent the first U.S. advisers to South Vietnam.
- March 12, 1956: 101 Congressmen signed the Southern Manifesto, a protest against the 1954 Supreme Court ruling (Brown v. Board of Education) desegregating public education.
- July 2, 1955: Senator Lyndon Johnson, Majority Leader of the United States Senate, suffered a major heart attack.
- September 24, 1955: President Eisenhower suffered a coronary thrombosis.
- November 5, 1955: Racial segregation was forbidden on trains and buses in U.S. interstate commerce.
- November 6, 1956: United States elections, 1956:
  - 1956 United States presidential election: Republican incumbent Dwight D. Eisenhower defeated Democratic challenger Adlai E. Stevenson in a rematch of their contest four years earlier.
  - United States Senate elections, 1956: The party balance of the chamber remained unchanged as Republican and Democratic gains cancelled each other.
  - United States House of Representatives elections, 1956: Republicans lost a net of two seats to the majority Democrats.
- December 1, 1955: Rosa Parks was arrested for refusing to give up her seat on the bus to a white person.
- December 5, 1955: The American Federation of Labor and the Congress of Industrial Organizations merged to become the AFL–CIO.

== Major legislation ==
- January 29, 1955: Formosa Resolution
- March 31, 1955: Career Incentive Act
- June 28, 1955: Flood Control and Coastal Emergency Act, Pub. L. 84–99, 69 Stat. 194
- July 11, 1955: To provide that all United States currency shall bear the inscription "In God We Trust", Pub. L. 84–140, 69 Stat. 290, 31 U.S.C. § 5114(b)
- July 14, 1955: Air Pollution Control Act, Pub. L. 84–159, ch. 360, 69 Stat. 322
- July 23, 1955: Multiple Surface Use Mining Act, Pub. L. 94–167, ch. 730, 68 Stat. 708
- August 9, 1955: Reserve Forces Act, Pub. L. 84–305, 69 Stat. 598
- August 11, 1955: National Housing Act ("Capehart Act"), Pub. L. 84–345, 69 Stat. 646
- August 12, 1955: Poliomyelitis Vaccination Assistance Act, Pub. L. 84–377, ch. 863, 69 Stat. 704
- April 11, 1956: Colorado River Storage Project Act, Pub. L. 84–485
- June 29, 1956: Federal-Aid Highway Act of 1956, (National Interstate and Defense Highways Act), Pub. L. 84–627
- July 30, 1956: Health Research Facilities Act, Pub. L. 84–835, ch. 779, 70 Stat. 717
- August 8, 1956: Fish and Wildlife Act of 1956, ch. 1036, 70 Stat. 1119, 16 U.S.C. § 742a

== Party summary ==
The count below identifies party affiliations at the beginning of the first session of this Congress, and includes members from vacancies and newly admitted states, when they were first seated. Changes resulting from subsequent replacements are shown below in the "Changes in membership" section.

The independent Wayne Morse, who caucused with Republicans in the second session of the previous Congress, began caucusing with the Democrats at the start of this Congress before ultimately becoming a Democrat himself.

Democrats briefly lost control of the Senate after the last congressional session as two seats flipped in special elections in November 1956.

=== Senate ===
| Affiliation | Party (Shading indicates majority caucus) | | | Total | |
| Affiliation | Democratic | Independent | Republican | Total | Vacant |
|---|---|---|---|---|---|
| End of previous Congress | 47 | 1 | 48 | 96 | 0 |
| Begin | 48 | 1 | 47 | 96 | 0 |
| February 17, 1955 | 49 | 0 | 47 | 96 | 0 |
| February 28, 1956 | 48 | 0 | 47 | 95 | 1 |
| March 13, 1956 | 49 | 0 | 47 | 96 | 0 |
| April 4, 1956 | 48 | 0 | 47 | 95 | 1 |
| April 5, 1956 | 49 | 0 | 47 | 96 | 0 |
| April 30, 1956 | 48 | 0 | 47 | 95 | 1 |
| June 21, 1956 | 49 | 0 | 47 | 96 | 0 |
| November 6, 1956 | 46 | 0 | 47 | 93 | 3 |
| November 7, 1956 | 47 | 0 | 49 | 96 | 0 |
| Final voting share | 49% | 0% | 50% | | |
| Beginning of the next Congress | 49 | 0 | 46 | 95 | 1 |

=== House of Representatives ===
| | Party (shading shows control) | | | Total | Vacant |
| | Democratic (D) | Independent (I) | Republican (R) | Total | Vacant |
|---|---|---|---|---|---|
| End of previous congress | 212 | 1 | 213 | 426 | 9 |
| Begin | 231 | 0 | 203 | 434 | 1 |
| End | 228 | 0 | 200 | 428 | 7 |
| Final voting share | 53.3% | 0.0% | 46.7% | | |
| Beginning of next congress | 233 | 0 | 200 | 433 | 2 |

== Leadership ==
=== Senate ===
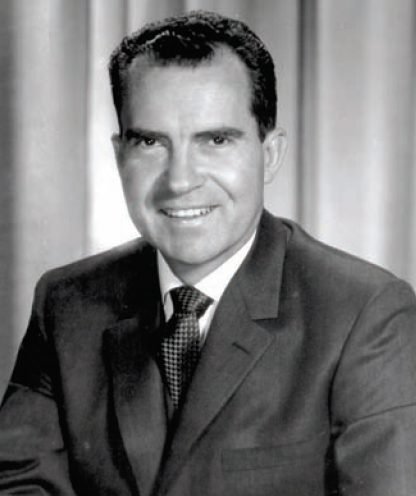
Senate President Richard Nixon (R)

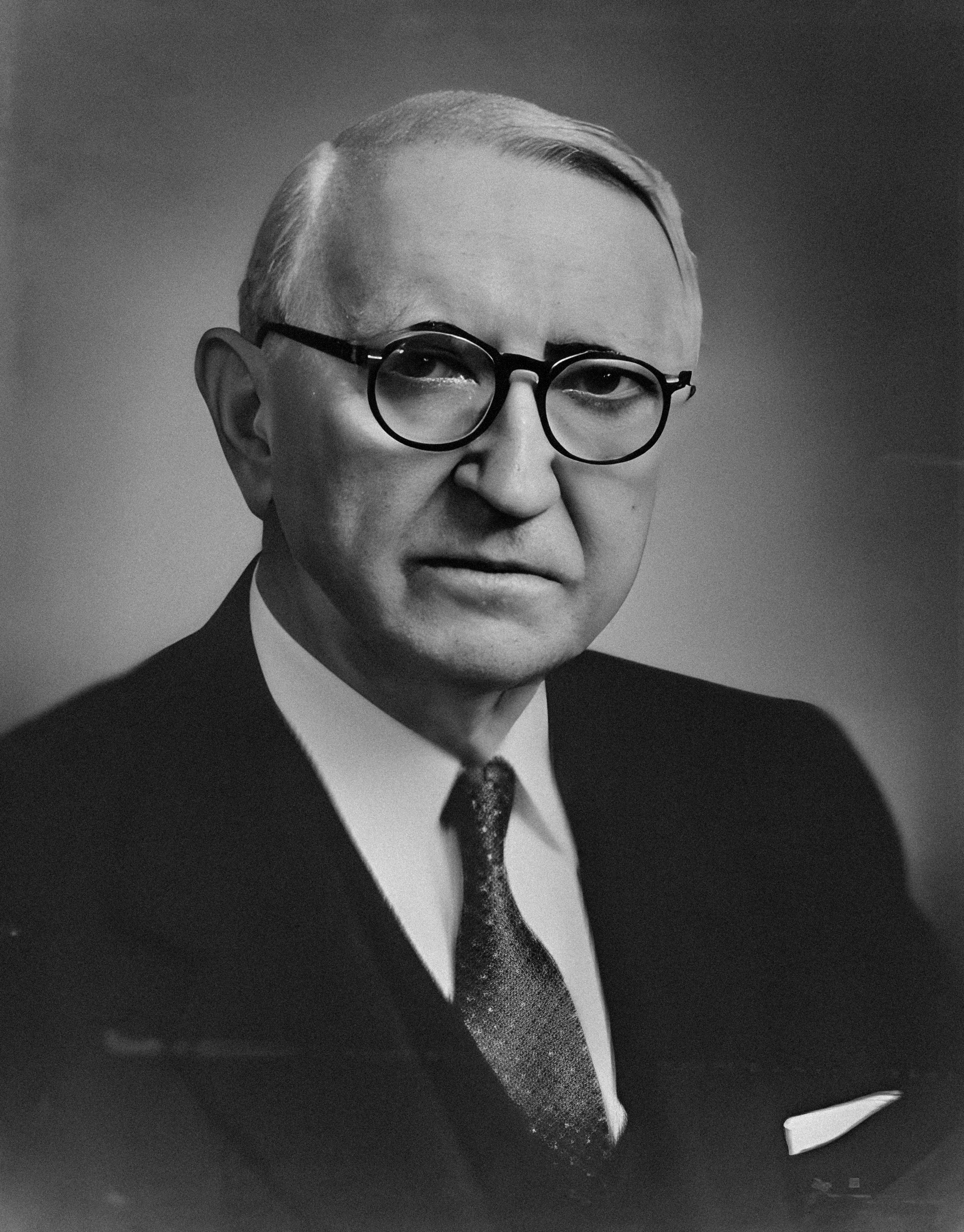
Senate President pro tempore Walter F. George (D)

- President: Richard Nixon (R)
- President pro tempore: Walter F. George (D)

==== Majority (Democratic) leadership ====
- Majority Leader and Democratic Conference chairman: Lyndon B. Johnson
- Majority Whip: Earle Clements
- Democratic Caucus Secretary: Thomas C. Hennings Jr.

==== Minority (Republican) leadership ====
- Minority Leader: William Knowland
- Minority Whip: Leverett Saltonstall
- Republican Conference chairman: Eugene Millikin
- Republican Conference Secretary: Milton Young
- National Senatorial Committee Chair: Barry Goldwater
- Policy Committee Chairman: Styles Bridges

=== House of Representatives ===
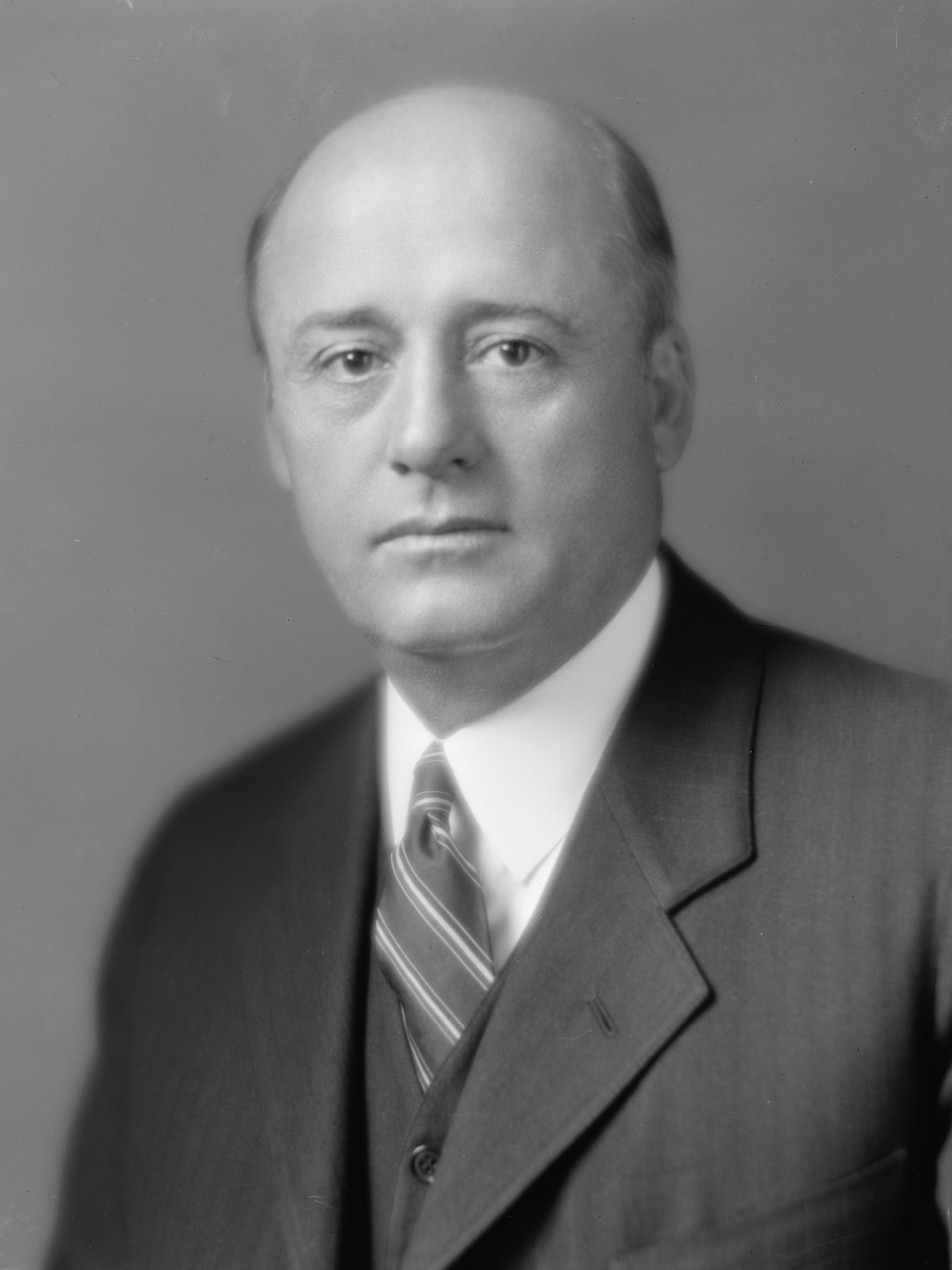
Speaker of the House Sam Rayburn (D)

- Speaker: Sam Rayburn (D)

==== Majority (Democratic) leadership ====
- Majority Leader: John W. McCormack
- Majority Whip: Carl Albert
- Democratic Caucus chairman: John J. Rooney
- Democratic Caucus Secretary: Edna F. Kelly
- Democratic Campaign Committee Chairman: Michael J. Kirwan

==== Minority (Republican) leadership ====
- Minority Leader: Joseph W. Martin Jr.
- Minority Whip: Leslie C. Arends
- Republican Conference chairman: Clifford R. Hope
- Policy Committee Chairman: Joseph W. Martin Jr.
- Republican Campaign Committee Chairman: Richard M. Simpson

== Caucuses ==
- House Democratic Caucus
- Senate Democratic Caucus

== Members ==
This list is arranged by chamber, then by state.

=== Senate ===
Senators are popularly elected statewide every two years, with one-third beginning new six-year terms with each Congress. Preceding the names in the list below are Senate class numbers, which indicate the cycle of their election. In this Congress, Class 1 meant their term began in the last Congress, facing re-election in 1958; Class 2 meant their term began with this Congress, facing re-election in 1960; and Class 3 meant their term ended with this Congress, facing re-election in 1956.

==== Alabama ====
▌2. John J. Sparkman (D)
▌3. J. Lister Hill (D)

==== Arizona ====
▌1. Barry Goldwater (R)
▌3. Carl Hayden (D)

==== Arkansas ====
▌2. John L. McClellan (D)
▌3. J. William Fulbright (D)

==== California ====
▌1. William Knowland (R)
▌3. Thomas Kuchel (R)

==== Colorado ====
▌2. Gordon Allott (R)
▌3. Eugene Millikin (R)

==== Connecticut ====
▌1. William A. Purtell (R)
▌3. Prescott Bush (R)

==== Delaware ====
▌1. John J. Williams (R)
▌2. J. Allen Frear Jr. (D)

==== Florida ====
▌1. Spessard Holland (D)
▌3. George Smathers (D)

==== Georgia ====
▌2. Richard Russell Jr. (D)
▌3. Walter F. George (D)

==== Idaho ====
▌2. Henry Dworshak (R)
▌3. Herman Welker (R)

==== Illinois ====
▌2. Paul Douglas (D)
▌3. Everett M. Dirksen (R)

==== Indiana ====
▌1. William E. Jenner (R)
▌3. Homer E. Capehart (R)

==== Iowa ====
▌2. Thomas E. Martin (R)
▌3. Bourke B. Hickenlooper (R)

==== Kansas ====
▌2. Andrew Frank Schoeppel (R)
▌3. Frank Carlson (R)

==== Kentucky ====
▌2. Alben Barkley (D), until April 30, 1956

▌Robert Humphreys (D), June 21, 1956 – November 6, 1956
▌John Sherman Cooper (R), from November 7, 1956

▌3. Earle Clements (D)

==== Louisiana ====
▌2. Allen J. Ellender (D)
▌3. Russell B. Long (D)

==== Maine ====
▌1. Frederick G. Payne (R)
▌2. Margaret Chase Smith (R)

==== Maryland ====
▌1. James Glenn Beall (R)
▌3. John Marshall Butler (R)

==== Massachusetts ====
▌1. John F. Kennedy (D)
▌2. Leverett Saltonstall (R)

==== Michigan ====
▌1. Charles E. Potter (R)
▌2. Patrick V. McNamara (D)

==== Minnesota ====
▌1. Edward John Thye (R)
▌2. Hubert Humphrey (DFL) (Note: The Minnesota Democratic–Farmer–Labor Party (DFL) and the North Dakota Democratic-Nonpartisan League Party (D-NPL) are the Minnesota and North Dakota affiliates of the U.S. Democratic Party and are counted as Democrats.)

==== Mississippi ====
▌1. John C. Stennis (D)
▌2. James Eastland (D)

==== Missouri ====
▌1. Stuart Symington (D)
▌3. Thomas C. Hennings Jr. (D)

==== Montana ====
▌1. Mike Mansfield (D)
▌2. James E. Murray (D)

==== Nebraska ====
▌1. Roman Hruska (R)
▌2. Carl Curtis (R)

==== Nevada ====
▌1. George W. Malone (R)
▌3. Alan Bible (D)

==== New Hampshire ====
▌2. Styles Bridges (R)
▌3. Norris Cotton (R)

==== New Jersey ====
▌1. Howard Alexander Smith (R)
▌2. Clifford P. Case (R)

==== New Mexico ====
▌1. Dennis Chávez (D)
▌2. Clinton P. Anderson (D)

==== New York ====
▌1. Irving Ives (R)
▌3. Herbert H. Lehman (D)

==== North Carolina ====
▌2. W. Kerr Scott (D)
▌3. Sam Ervin (D)

==== North Dakota ====
▌1. William Langer (R-NPL)
▌3. Milton Young (R)

==== Ohio ====
▌1. John W. Bricker (R)
▌3. George H. Bender (R)

==== Oklahoma ====
▌2. Robert S. Kerr (D)
▌3. A. S. Mike Monroney (D)

==== Oregon ====
▌2. Richard L. Neuberger (D)
▌▌3. Wayne Morse (I), changed to (D) April 30, 1955

==== Pennsylvania ====
▌1. Edward Martin (R)
▌3. James H. Duff (R)

==== Rhode Island ====
▌1. John Pastore (D)
▌2. Theodore F. Green (D)

==== South Carolina ====
▌2. Strom Thurmond (D), until April 4, 1956

▌Thomas A. Wofford (D), April 5, 1956 – November 6, 1956
▌Strom Thurmond (D), from November 7, 1956

▌3. Olin D. Johnston (D)

==== South Dakota ====
▌2. Karl E. Mundt (R)
▌3. Francis Case (R)

==== Tennessee ====
▌1. Albert Gore Sr. (D)
▌2. Estes Kefauver (D)

==== Texas ====
▌1. Price Daniel (D)
▌2. Lyndon B. Johnson (D)

==== Utah ====
▌1. Arthur Vivian Watkins (R)
▌3. Wallace F. Bennett (R)

==== Vermont ====
▌1. Ralph Flanders (R)
▌3. George Aiken (R)

==== Virginia ====
▌1. Harry F. Byrd (D)
▌2. A. Willis Robertson (D)

==== Washington ====
▌1. Henry M. Jackson (D)
▌3. Warren G. Magnuson (D)

==== West Virginia ====
▌1. Harley M. Kilgore (D), until February 28, 1956

▌William Laird III (D), March 13, 1956 – November 6, 1956
▌Chapman Revercomb (R), from November 7, 1956

▌2. Matthew M. Neely (D)

==== Wisconsin ====
▌1. Joseph McCarthy (R)
▌3. Alexander Wiley (R)

==== Wyoming ====
▌1. Frank A. Barrett (R)
▌2. Joseph C. O'Mahoney (D)

Senators' party membership by state at the opening of the 84th Congress in January 1955 2 Democrats 1 Democrat and 1 Republican 2 Republicans 1 Independent and 1 Democrat

Senate majority leadership

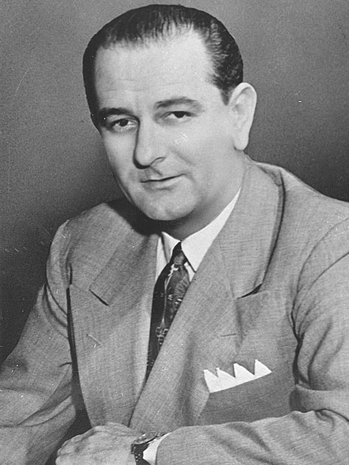
Democratic leader
Lyndon B. Johnson

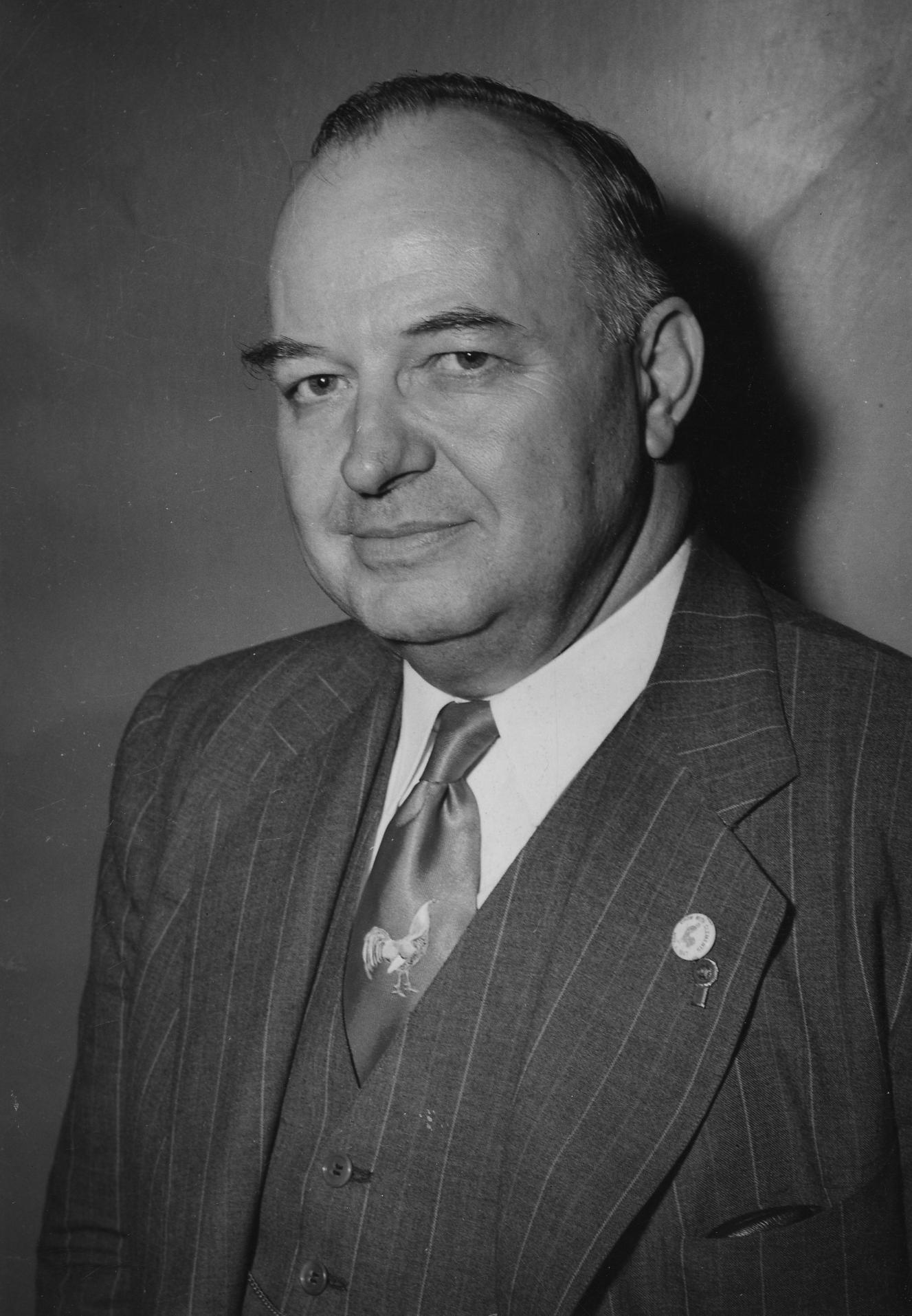
Democratic whip
Earle Clements

Senate minority leadership

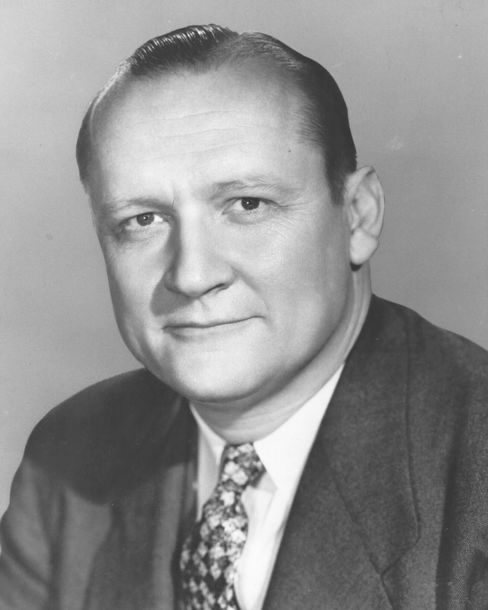
Republican leader
William Knowland

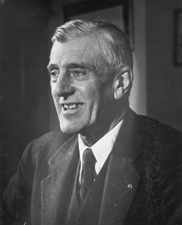
Republican whip
Leverett Saltonstall

=== House of Representatives ===
The names of representatives are preceded by their district numbers.

==== Alabama ====
▌1. Frank W. Boykin (D)
▌2. George M. Grant (D)
▌3. George W. Andrews (D)
▌4. Kenneth A. Roberts (D)
▌5. Albert Rains (D)
▌6. Armistead Selden (D)
▌7. Carl Elliott (D)
▌8. Robert E. Jones Jr. (D)
▌9. George Huddleston Jr. (D)

==== Arizona ====
▌1. John Jacob Rhodes (R)
▌2. Stewart Udall (D)

==== Arkansas ====
▌1. Ezekiel C. Gathings (D)
▌2. Wilbur Mills (D)
▌3. James William Trimble (D)
▌4. Oren Harris (D)
▌5. Brooks Hays (D)
▌6. William F. Norrell (D)

==== California ====
▌1. Hubert B. Scudder (R)
▌2. Clair Engle (D)
▌3. John E. Moss (D)
▌4. William S. Mailliard (R)
▌5. John F. Shelley (D)
▌6. John F. Baldwin Jr. (R)
▌7. John J. Allen Jr. (R)
▌8. George P. Miller (D)
▌9. J. Arthur Younger (R)
▌10. Charles Gubser (R)
▌11. J. Leroy Johnson (R)
▌12. B. F. Sisk (D)
▌13. Charles M. Teague (R)
▌14. Harlan Hagen (D)
▌15. Gordon L. McDonough (R)
▌16. Donald L. Jackson (R)
▌17. Cecil R. King (D)
▌18. Craig Hosmer (R)
▌19. Chester E. Holifield (D)
▌20. John Carl Hinshaw (R), until August 5, 1956
▌21. Edgar W. Hiestand (R)
▌22. Joseph F. Holt (R)
▌23. Clyde Doyle (D)
▌24. Glenard P. Lipscomb (R)
▌25. Patrick J. Hillings (R)
▌26. James Roosevelt (D)
▌27. Harry R. Sheppard (D)
▌28. James B. Utt (R)
▌29. John R. Phillips (R)
▌30. Bob Wilson (R)

==== Colorado ====
▌1. Byron G. Rogers (D)
▌2. William S. Hill (R)
▌3. John Chenoweth (R)
▌4. Wayne N. Aspinall (D)

==== Connecticut ====
▌1. Thomas J. Dodd (D)
▌2. Horace Seely-Brown Jr. (R)
▌3. Albert W. Cretella (R)
▌4. Albert P. Morano (R)
▌5. James T. Patterson (R)
▌At-large. Antoni Sadlak (R)

==== Delaware ====
▌At-large. Harris McDowell (D)

==== Florida ====
▌1. William C. Cramer (R)
▌2. Charles E. Bennett (D)
▌3. Robert L. F. Sikes (D)
▌4. Dante Fascell (D)
▌5. Syd Herlong (D)
▌6. Paul Rogers (D), from January 11, 1955
▌7. James A. Haley (D)
▌8. Donald Ray Matthews (D)

==== Georgia ====
▌1. Prince Preston (D)
▌2. J. L. Pilcher (D)
▌3. Tic Forrester (D)
▌4. John Flynt (D)
▌5. James C. Davis (D)
▌6. Carl Vinson (D)
▌7. Henderson Lovelace Lanham (D)
▌8. Iris Faircloth Blitch (D)
▌9. Phil Landrum (D)
▌10. Paul Brown (D)

==== Idaho ====
▌1. Gracie Pfost (D)
▌2. Hamer H. Budge (R)

==== Illinois ====
▌1. William L. Dawson (D)
▌2. Barratt O'Hara (D)
▌3. James C. Murray (D)
▌4. William E. McVey (R)
▌5. John C. Kluczynski (D)
▌6. Thomas J. O'Brien (D)
▌7. James Bowler (D)
▌8. Thomas S. Gordon (D)
▌9. Sidney R. Yates (D)
▌10. Richard W. Hoffman (R)
▌11. Timothy P. Sheehan (R)
▌12. Charles A. Boyle (D)
▌13. Marguerite S. Church (R)
▌14. Chauncey W. Reed (R), until February 9, 1956
▌15. Noah M. Mason (R)
▌16. Leo E. Allen (R)
▌17. Leslie C. Arends (R)
▌18. Harold H. Velde (R)
▌19. Robert B. Chiperfield (R)
▌20. Sid Simpson (R)
▌21. Peter F. Mack Jr. (D)
▌22. William L. Springer (R)
▌23. Charles W. Vursell (R)
▌24. Melvin Price (D)
▌25. Kenneth J. Gray (D)

==== Indiana ====
▌1. Ray Madden (D)
▌2. Charles A. Halleck (R)
▌3. Shepard J. Crumpacker Jr. (R)
▌4. E. Ross Adair (R)
▌5. John V. Beamer (R)
▌6. Cecil M. Harden (R)
▌7. William G. Bray (R)
▌8. Winfield K. Denton (D)
▌9. Earl Wilson (R)
▌10. Ralph Harvey (R)
▌11. Charles B. Brownson (R)

==== Iowa ====
▌1. Fred Schwengel (R)
▌2. Henry O. Talle (R)
▌3. H. R. Gross (R)
▌4. Karl M. LeCompte (R)
▌5. Paul H. Cunningham (R)
▌6. James I. Dolliver (R)
▌7. Ben F. Jensen (R)
▌8. Charles B. Hoeven (R)

==== Kansas ====
▌1. William H. Avery (R)
▌2. Errett P. Scrivner (R)
▌3. Myron V. George (R)
▌4. Edward Herbert Rees (R)
▌5. Clifford R. Hope (R)
▌6. Wint Smith (R)

==== Kentucky ====
▌1. Noble J. Gregory (D)
▌2. William Natcher (D)
▌3. John M. Robsion Jr. (R)
▌4. Frank Chelf (D)
▌5. Brent Spence (D)
▌6. John C. Watts (D)
▌7. Carl D. Perkins (D)
▌8. Eugene Siler (R)

==== Louisiana ====
▌1. F. Edward Hébert (D)
▌2. Hale Boggs (D)
▌3. Edwin E. Willis (D)
▌4. Overton Brooks (D)
▌5. Otto Passman (D)
▌6. James H. Morrison (D)
▌7. T. Ashton Thompson (D)
▌8. George S. Long (D)

==== Maine ====
▌1. Robert Hale (R)
▌2. Charles P. Nelson (R)
▌3. Clifford McIntire (R)

==== Maryland ====
▌1. Edward Tylor Miller (R)
▌2. James Devereux (R)
▌3. Edward Garmatz (D)
▌4. George Hyde Fallon (D)
▌5. Richard Lankford (D)
▌6. DeWitt Hyde (R)
▌7. Samuel Friedel (D)

==== Massachusetts ====
▌1. John W. Heselton (R)
▌2. Edward Boland (D)
▌3. Philip J. Philbin (D)
▌4. Harold Donohue (D)
▌5. Edith Nourse Rogers (R)
▌6. William H. Bates (R)
▌7. Thomas J. Lane (D)
▌8. Torbert Macdonald (D)
▌9. Donald W. Nicholson (R)
▌10. Laurence Curtis (R)
▌11. Tip O'Neill (D)
▌12. John W. McCormack (D)
▌13. Richard B. Wigglesworth (R)
▌14. Joseph W. Martin Jr. (R)

==== Michigan ====
▌1. Thaddeus M. Machrowicz (D)
▌2. George Meader (R)
▌3. August E. Johansen (R)
▌4. Clare Hoffman (R)
▌5. Gerald Ford (R)
▌6. Donald Hayworth (D)
▌7. Jesse P. Wolcott (R)
▌8. Alvin Morell Bentley (R)
▌9. Ruth Thompson (R)
▌10. Elford Albin Cederberg (R)
▌11. Victor A. Knox (R)
▌12. John B. Bennett (R)
▌13. Charles Diggs (D)
▌14. Louis C. Rabaut (D)
▌15. John D. Dingell Sr. (D), until September 19, 1955

▌John D. Dingell Jr. (D), from December 13, 1955

▌16. John Lesinski Jr. (D)
▌17. Martha Griffiths (D)
▌18. George A. Dondero (R)

==== Minnesota ====
▌1. August H. Andresen (R)
▌2. Joseph P. O'Hara (R)
▌3. Roy Wier (DFL)
▌4. Eugene McCarthy (DFL)
▌5. Walter Judd (R)
▌6. Fred Marshall (DFL)
▌7. Herman Carl Andersen (R)
▌8. John Blatnik (DFL)
▌9. Coya Knutson (DFL)

==== Mississippi ====
▌1. Thomas Abernethy (D)
▌2. Jamie L. Whitten (D)
▌3. Frank Ellis Smith (D)
▌4. John Bell Williams (D)
▌5. W. Arthur Winstead (D)
▌6. William M. Colmer (D)

==== Missouri ====
▌1. Frank M. Karsten (D)
▌2. Thomas B. Curtis (R)
▌3. Leonor Sullivan (D)
▌4. George H. Christopher (D)
▌5. Richard Walker Bolling (D)
▌6. William Raleigh Hull Jr. (D)
▌7. Dewey Short (R)
▌8. A. S. J. Carnahan (D)
▌9. Clarence Cannon (D)
▌10. Paul C. Jones (D)
▌11. Morgan M. Moulder (D)

==== Montana ====
▌1. Lee Metcalf (D)
▌2. Orvin B. Fjare (R)

==== Nebraska ====
▌1. Phillip Hart Weaver (R)
▌2. Jackson B. Chase (R)
▌3. Robert Dinsmore Harrison (R)
▌4. Arthur L. Miller (R)

==== Nevada ====
▌At-large. Clarence Clifton Young (R)

==== New Hampshire ====
▌1. Chester Earl Merrow (R)
▌2. Perkins Bass (R)

==== New Jersey ====
▌1. Charles A. Wolverton (R)
▌2. T. Millet Hand (R), until December 26, 1956
▌3. James C. Auchincloss (R)
▌4. Frank Thompson (D)
▌5. Peter Frelinghuysen Jr. (R)
▌6. Harrison A. Williams (D)
▌7. William B. Widnall (R)
▌8. Gordon Canfield (R)
▌9. Frank C. Osmers Jr. (R)
▌10. Peter W. Rodino (D)
▌11. Hugh Joseph Addonizio (D)
▌12. Robert Kean (R)
▌13. Alfred Dennis Sieminski (D)
▌14. T. James Tumulty (D)

==== New Mexico ====
Both representatives were elected statewide on a general ticket.

▌At-large. Antonio M. Fernández (D), until November 7, 1956
▌At-large. John J. Dempsey (D)

==== New York ====
▌1. Stuyvesant Wainwright (R)
▌2. Steven Derounian (R)
▌3. Frank J. Becker (R)
▌4. Henry J. Latham (R)
▌5. Albert H. Bosch (R)
▌6. Lester Holtzman (D)
▌7. James J. Delaney (D)
▌8. Victor Anfuso (D)
▌9. Eugene James Keogh (D)
▌10. Edna F. Kelly (D)
▌11. Emanuel Celler (D)
▌12. Francis E. Dorn (R)
▌13. Abraham J. Multer (D)
▌14. John J. Rooney (D)
▌15. John H. Ray (R)
▌16. Adam Clayton Powell Jr. (D)
▌17. Frederic René Coudert Jr. (R)
▌18. James G. Donovan (D)
▌19. Arthur George Klein (D), until December 31, 1956
▌20. Irwin D. Davidson (D-L), until December 31, 1956
▌21. Herbert Zelenko (D)
▌22. Sidney A. Fine (D), until January 2, 1956

▌James C. Healey (D), from February 7, 1956

▌23. Isidore Dollinger (D)
▌24. Charles A. Buckley (D)
▌25. Paul A. Fino (R)
▌26. Ralph A. Gamble (R)
▌27. Ralph W. Gwinn (R)
▌28. Katharine St. George (R)
▌29. J. Ernest Wharton (R)
▌30. Leo W. O'Brien (D)
▌31. Dean P. Taylor (R)
▌32. Bernard W. Kearney (R)
▌33. Clarence E. Kilburn (R)
▌34. William R. Williams (R)
▌35. R. Walter Riehlman (R)
▌36. John Taber (R)
▌37. W. Sterling Cole (R)
▌38. Kenneth Keating (R)
▌39. Harold C. Ostertag (R)
▌40. William E. Miller (R)
▌41. Edmund P. Radwan (R)
▌42. John R. Pillion (R)
▌43. Daniel A. Reed (R)

==== North Carolina ====
▌1. Herbert Covington Bonner (D)
▌2. Lawrence H. Fountain (D)
▌3. Graham A. Barden (D)
▌4. Harold D. Cooley (D)
▌5. Richard Thurmond Chatham (D)
▌6. Carl T. Durham (D)
▌7. Frank Ertel Carlyle (D)
▌8. Charles B. Deane (D)
▌9. Hugh Quincy Alexander (D)
▌10. Charles R. Jonas (R)
▌11. Woodrow W. Jones (D)
▌12. George A. Shuford (D)

==== North Dakota ====
Both representatives were elected statewide on a general ticket.

▌At-large. Usher L. Burdick (R-NPL)
▌At-large. Otto Krueger (R)

==== Ohio ====
▌1. Gordon H. Scherer (R)
▌2. William E. Hess (R)
▌3. Paul F. Schenck (R)
▌4. William Moore McCulloch (R)
▌5. Cliff Clevenger (R)
▌6. James G. Polk (D)
▌7. Clarence J. Brown (R)
▌8. Jackson Edward Betts (R)
▌9. Thomas L. Ashley (D)
▌10. Thomas A. Jenkins (R)
▌11. Oliver P. Bolton (R)
▌12. John M. Vorys (R)
▌13. Albert David Baumhart Jr. (R)
▌14. William Hanes Ayres (R)
▌15. John E. Henderson (R)
▌16. Frank T. Bow (R)
▌17. J. Harry McGregor (R)
▌18. Wayne Hays (D)
▌19. Michael J. Kirwan (D)
▌20. Michael A. Feighan (D)
▌21. Charles Vanik (D)
▌22. Frances P. Bolton (R)
▌23. William Edwin Minshall Jr. (R)

==== Oklahoma ====
▌1. Page Belcher (R)
▌2. Ed Edmondson (D)
▌3. Carl Albert (D)
▌4. Tom Steed (D)
▌5. John Jarman (D)
▌6. Victor Wickersham (D)

==== Oregon ====
▌1. A. Walter Norblad (R)
▌2. Sam Coon (R)
▌3. Edith Green (D)
▌4. Harris Ellsworth (R)

==== Pennsylvania ====
▌1. William A. Barrett (D)
▌2. William T. Granahan (D), until May 25, 1956

▌Kathryn E. Granahan (D), from November 6, 1956

▌3. James A. Byrne (D)
▌4. Earl Chudoff (D)
▌5. William J. Green Jr. (D)
▌6. Hugh Scott (R)
▌7. Benjamin F. James (R)
▌8. Karl C. King (R)
▌9. Paul B. Dague (R)
▌10. Joseph L. Carrigg (R)
▌11. Dan Flood (D)
▌12. Ivor D. Fenton (R)
▌13. Samuel K. McConnell Jr. (R)
▌14. George M. Rhodes (D)
▌15. Francis E. Walter (D)
▌16. Walter M. Mumma (R)
▌17. Alvin Bush (R)
▌18. Richard M. Simpson (R)
▌19. James M. Quigley (D)
▌20. James E. Van Zandt (R)
▌21. Augustine B. Kelley (D)
▌22. John P. Saylor (R)
▌23. Leon H. Gavin (R)
▌24. Carroll D. Kearns (R)
▌25. Frank M. Clark (D)
▌26. Thomas E. Morgan (D)
▌27. James G. Fulton (R)
▌28. Herman P. Eberharter (D)
▌29. Robert J. Corbett (R)
▌30. Vera Buchanan (D), until November 26, 1955

▌Elmer J. Holland (D), from January 24, 1956

==== Rhode Island ====
▌1. Aime Forand (D)
▌2. John E. Fogarty (D)

==== South Carolina ====
▌1. L. Mendel Rivers (D)
▌2. John J. Riley (D)
▌3. William Jennings Bryan Dorn (D)
▌4. Robert T. Ashmore (D)
▌5. James P. Richards (D)
▌6. John L. McMillan (D)

==== South Dakota ====
▌1. Harold Lovre (R)
▌2. Ellis Yarnal Berry (R)

==== Tennessee ====
▌1. B. Carroll Reece (R)
▌2. Howard Baker Sr. (R)
▌3. James B. Frazier Jr. (D)
▌4. Joe L. Evins (D)
▌5. Percy Priest (D), until October 12, 1956
▌6. Ross Bass (D)
▌7. Tom J. Murray (D)
▌8. Jere Cooper (D)
▌9. Clifford Davis (D)

==== Texas ====
▌1. Wright Patman (D)
▌2. Jack Brooks (D)
▌3. Brady P. Gentry (D)
▌4. Sam Rayburn (D)
▌5. Bruce Alger (R)
▌6. Olin E. Teague (D)
▌7. John Dowdy (D)
▌8. Albert Thomas (D)
▌9. Clark W. Thompson (D)
▌10. Homer Thornberry (D)
▌11. William R. Poage (D)
▌12. Jim Wright (D)
▌13. Frank N. Ikard (D)
▌14. John J. Bell (D)
▌15. Joe M. Kilgore (D)
▌16. J. T. Rutherford (D)
▌17. Omar Burleson (D)
▌18. Walter E. Rogers (D)
▌19. George H. Mahon (D)
▌20. Paul J. Kilday (D)
▌21. O. C. Fisher (D)
▌At-large. Martin Dies Jr. (D)

==== Utah ====
▌1. Henry Aldous Dixon (R)
▌2. William A. Dawson (R)

==== Vermont ====
▌At-large. Winston L. Prouty (R)

==== Virginia ====
▌1. Edward J. Robeson Jr. (D)
▌2. Porter Hardy Jr. (D)
▌3. J. Vaughan Gary (D)
▌4. Watkins Moorman Abbitt (D)
▌5. William M. Tuck (D)
▌6. Richard Harding Poff (R)
▌7. Burr Harrison (D)
▌8. Howard W. Smith (D)
▌9. W. Pat Jennings (D)
▌10. Joel Broyhill (R)

==== Washington ====
▌1. Thomas Pelly (R)
▌2. Jack Westland (R)
▌3. Russell V. Mack (R)
▌4. Hal Holmes (R)
▌5. Walt Horan (R)
▌6. Thor C. Tollefson (R)
▌At-large. Donald H. Magnuson (D)

==== West Virginia ====
▌1. Bob Mollohan (D)
▌2. Harley Orrin Staggers (D)
▌3. Cleveland M. Bailey (D)
▌4. Maurice G. Burnside (D)
▌5. Elizabeth Kee (D)
▌6. Robert Byrd (D)

==== Wisconsin ====
▌1. Lawrence H. Smith (R)
▌2. Glenn Robert Davis (R)
▌3. Gardner R. Withrow (R)
▌4. Clement J. Zablocki (D)
▌5. Henry S. Reuss (D)
▌6. William Van Pelt (R)
▌7. Melvin Laird (R)
▌8. John W. Byrnes (R)
▌9. Lester Johnson (D)
▌10. Alvin O'Konski (R)

==== Wyoming ====
▌At-large. Edwin Keith Thomson (R)

==== Non-voting members ====
▌Alaska Territory. Bob Bartlett (D)
▌Hawaii Territory. Mary Elizabeth Pruett Farrington (R)
▌Puerto Rico. Antonio Fernós-Isern (PPD)

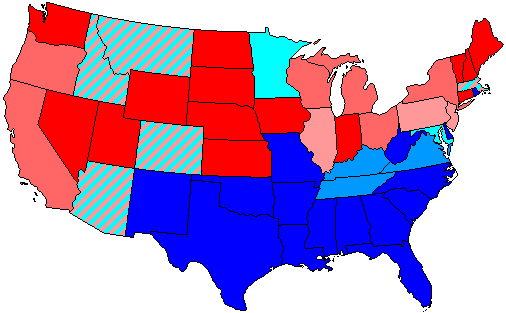
House seats by party holding plurality in state: 80+% to 100% Democratic / 80+% to 100% Republican; 60+% to 80% Democratic / 60+% to 80% Republican; Up to 60% Democratic / Up to 60% Republican

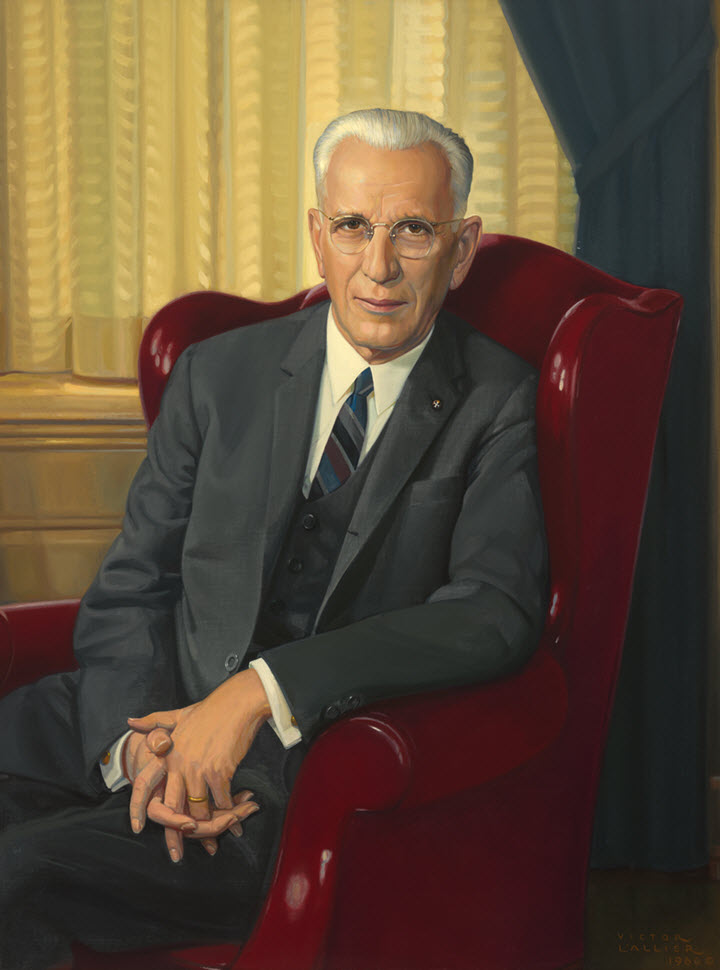
House Majority Leader John W. McCormack (D)

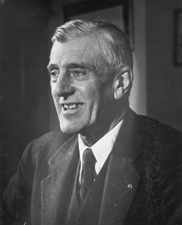
House Majority Whip Leverett Saltonstall (D)

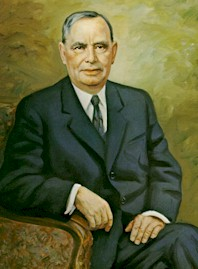
House Minority Leader Joseph W. Martin Jr. (R)

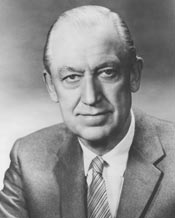
House Minority Whip Leslie C. Arends (R)

== Changes in membership ==
The count below reflects changes from the beginning of this Congress.

=== Senate ===
- Replacements: 3
  - Democratic: 1 net loss
  - Independent Democratic: 1 net loss
  - Republican: 2 net gain
- Deaths: 2
- Resignations: 1
- Interim appointments: 3
- Total seats with changes: 3

Senate changes
| State (class) | Vacated by | Reason for change | Successor | Date of successor's formal installation (Note: When seated or oath administered, not necessarily when service began.) |
|---|---|---|---|---|
| Oregon (3) | Wayne Morse (I) | Changed Political Parties February 17, 1955 | Wayne Morse (D) | February 17, 1955 |
| West Virginia (1) | Harley M. Kilgore (D) | Died February 28, 1956 | William Laird III (D) | March 13, 1956 |
| South Carolina (2) | Strom Thurmond (ID) | Resigned April 4, 1956, to trigger a contested primary as promised to voters | Thomas A. Wofford (D) | April 5, 1956 |
| Kentucky (2) | Alben W. Barkley (D) | Died April 30, 1956 | Robert Humphreys (D) | June 21, 1956 |
| Kentucky (2) | Robert Humphreys (D) | Successor elected November 6, 1956 | John Sherman Cooper (R) | November 7, 1956 |
| South Carolina (2) | Thomas A. Wofford (D) | Successor elected November 6, 1956 | Strom Thurmond (D) | November 7, 1956 |
| West Virginia (1) | William Laird III (D) | Successor elected November 6, 1956 | Chapman Revercomb (R) | November 7, 1956 |

=== House of Representatives ===
- Replacements: 5
  - Democratic: no net change
  - Republican: no net change
- Deaths: 9
- Resignations: 3
- Total seats with changes: 12

House changes
| District | Vacated by | Reason for change | Successor | Date of successor's formal installation |
|---|---|---|---|---|
| Florida 6th | Vacant | Rep. Dwight L. Rogers died during the previous congress after having been re-elected. Successor elected January 11, 1955. | Paul Rogers (D) | January 11, 1955 |
| Michigan 15th | John Dingell Sr. (D) | Died September 19, 1955. Successor elected December 13, 1955. | John Dingell (D) | December 13, 1955 |
| Pennsylvania 30th | Vera Buchanan (D) | Died November 26, 1955. Successor elected January 24, 1956. | Elmer J. Holland (D) | January 24, 1956 |
| New York 22nd | Sidney A. Fine (D) | Resigned January 2, 1956. Successor elected February 7, 1956. | James C. Healey (D) | February 7, 1956 |
| Illinois 14th | Chauncey W. Reed (R) | Died February 9, 1956; Seat remained unfilled until next term. | Vacant | |
| Pennsylvania 2nd | William T. Granahan (D) | Died May 25, 1956. Successor elected November 6, 1956. | Kathryn E. Granahan (D) | November 6, 1956 |
| California 20th | John Carl Hinshaw (R) | Died August 5, 1956. Seat remained unfilled until next term. | Vacant | |
| Tennessee 5th | Percy Priest (D) | Died October 12, 1956. Seat remained unfilled until next term. | Vacant | |
| New Mexico at-large | Antonio M. Fernández (D) | Died November 7, 1956. Seat remained unfilled until next term. | Vacant | |
| New Jersey 2nd | T. Millet Hand (R) | Died December 26, 1956. Seat remained unfilled until next term. | Vacant | |
| New York 19th | Arthur George Klein (D) | Resigned December 31, 1956 after being elected to the New York Supreme Court. Seat remained unfilled until next term. | Vacant | |
| New York 20th | Irwin D. Davidson (DL) | Resigned December 31, 1956. Seat remained unfilled until next term. | Vacant | |

== Committees ==
Lists of committees and their party leaders for members of the House and Senate committees can be found through the Official Congressional Directory at the bottom of this article. The directory after the pages of terms of service lists committees of the Senate, House (Standing with Subcommittees, Select and Special) and Joint and, after that, House/Senate committee assignments. On the committees section of the House and Senate in the Official Congressional Directory, the committee's members on the first row on the left side shows the chairman of the committee and on the right side shows the ranking member of the committee.

=== Senate ===
- Agriculture and Forestry (Chairman: Allen J. Ellender; Ranking Member: George D. Aiken)
- Appropriations (Chairman: Carl Hayden; Ranking Member: Styles Bridges)
- Armed Services (Chairman: Richard B. Russell; Ranking Member: Styles Bridges)
- Banking and Currency (Chairman: J. William Fulbright; Ranking Member: Homer Capehart)
- Contribution Investigation (Select)
- District of Columbia (Chairman: Matthew M. Neely; Ranking Member: J. Glenn Beall)
- Finance (Chairman: Harry F. Byrd; Ranking Member: Eugene D. Millikin)
- Foreign Relations (Chairman: Walter F. George; Ranking Member: Alexander Wiley)
- Foreign Aid Program (Special)
- Government Operations (Chairman: John Little McClellan; Ranking Member: Joseph McCarthy)
- Interior and Insular Affairs (Chairman: James E. Murray; Ranking Member: Eugene D. Millikin)
- Interstate and Foreign Commerce (Chairman: Warren G. Magnuson; Ranking Member: John W. Bricker)
- Judiciary (Chairman: Harley M. Kilgore; Ranking Member: Alexander Wiley)
- Labor and Public Welfare (Chairman: J. Lister Hill; Ranking Member: H. Alexander Smith)
- Political Activities, Lobbying and Campaign Contributions (Special)
- Post Office and Civil Service (Chairman: Olin D. Johnston; Ranking Member: Frank Carlson)
- Public Works (Chairman: Dennis Chavez; Ranking Member: Edward Martin)
- Rules and Administration (Chairman: Theodore F. Green; Ranking Member: William E. Jenner)
- Senate Reception Room (Special) (Chairman: [data missing]; Ranking Member: [data missing])
- Small Business (Select) (Chairman: John J. Sparkman)
- Whole

=== House of Representatives ===
- Agriculture (Chairman: Harold D. Cooley; Ranking Member: Clifford R. Hope)
- Appropriations (Chairman: Clarence Cannon; Ranking Member: John Taber)
- Armed Services (Chairman: Carl Vinson; Ranking Member: Dewey J. Short)
- Banking and Currency (Chairman: Brent Spence; Ranking Member: Jesse P. Wolcott)
- Benefits for Dependents of Armed Services Veterans (Select) (Chairman: Porter Hardy Jr.)
- Defense Production (Chairman: [data missing]; Ranking Member: [data missing])
- District of Columbia (Chairman: John L. McMillan; Ranking Member: Sid Simpson)
- Education and Labor (Chairman: Graham A. Barden; Ranking Member: Samuel K. McConnell Jr.)
- Foreign Affairs (Chairman: James P. Richards; Ranking Member: Robert B. Chiperfield)
- Government Operations (Chairman: William L. Dawson; Ranking Member: Clare E. Hoffman)
- House Administration (Chairman: Omar Burleson; Ranking Member: Karl M. LeCompte)
- Investigate the Incorporation of the Baltic States into the U.S.S.R. (Select) (Chairman: [data missing]; Ranking Member: [data missing])
- Interior and Insular Affairs (Chairman: Clair Engle; Ranking Member: A.L. Miller)
- Interstate and Foreign Commerce (Chairman: J. Percy Priest; Ranking Member: Charles A. Wolverton)
- Judiciary (Chairman: Emanuel Celler; Ranking Member: Chauncey W. Reed then Kenneth B. Keating)
- Merchant Marine and Fisheries (Chairman: Herbert C. Bonner; Ranking Member: Thor C. Tollefson)
- Post Office and Civil Service (Chairman: Tom J. Murray; Ranking Member: Edward H. Rees)
- Public Works (Chairman: Charles A. Buckley; Ranking Member: George A. Dondero)
- Rules (Chairman: Howard W. Smith; Ranking Member: Leo E. Allen)
- Small Business (Select) (Chairman: Wright Patman)
- Standards of Official Conduct
- Un-American Activities (Chairman: Francis E. Walter; Ranking Member: Harold H. Velde)
- Veterans' Affairs (Chairman: Olin E. Teague; Ranking Member: Edith Nourse Rogers)
- Ways and Means (Chairman: Jere Cooper; Ranking Member: Daniel A. Reed)
- Whole

=== Joint committees ===
- Atomic Energy (Chairman: Sen. Clinton P. Anderson; Vice Chairman: Rep. Carl T. Durham)
- Conditions of Indian Tribes (Special)
- Construction of a Building for a Museum of History and Technology for the Smithsonian
- Defense Production
- Disposition of Executive Papers
- Economic
- Immigration and Nationality Policy (Chairman: Sen. Arthur V. Watkins)
- Legislative Budget
- The Library (Chairman: Omar Burleson; Vice Chairman: Theodore F. Green)
- Navajo-Hopi Indian Administration
- Printing (Chairman: Sen. Carl Hayden; Vice Chairman: Rep. Omar Burleson)
- Reduction of Nonessential Federal Expenditures (Chairman: Sen. Harry F. Byrd; Vice Chairman: Rep. Daniel A. Reed)
- Taxation (Chairman: Rep. Jere Cooper; Vice Chairman: Sen. Paul H. Douglas)

== Employees ==
=== Legislative branch agency directors ===
- Architect of the Capitol: J. George Stewart
- Attending Physician of the United States Congress: George Calver
- Comptroller General of the United States: Joseph Campbell
- Librarian of Congress: Lawrence Quincy Mumford
- Public Printer of the United States: Raymond Blattenberger

=== Senate ===
- Chaplain: Frederick Brown Harris, Methodist
- Parliamentarian: Charles Watkins
- Secretary: Felton McLellan Johnston
- Librarian: Richard D. Hupman
- Secretary for the Majority: Robert G. Baker
- Secretary for the Minority: J. Mark Trice
- Sergeant at Arms: Joseph C. Duke

=== House of Representatives ===
- Clerk: Ralph R. Roberts
- Sergeant at Arms: Zeake W. Johnson Jr.
- Doorkeeper: William Mosley "Fishbait" Miller
- Postmaster: H. H. Morris
- Parliamentarian: Lewis Deschler
- Reading Clerks: George J. Maurer (D) and Alney E. Chaffee (R)
- Chaplain: Bernard Braskamp (Presbyterian)

== See also ==
- 1954 United States elections (elections leading to this Congress)
  - 1954 United States Senate elections
  - 1954 United States House of Representatives elections
- 1956 United States elections (elections during this Congress, leading to the next Congress)
  - 1956 United States presidential election
  - 1956 United States Senate elections
  - 1956 United States House of Representatives elections
