= Revercomb =

Surname

Revercomb is a surname. Notable people with the surname include:

- George A. Revercomb (1858–1937), American politician
- George Hughes Revercomb (1929–1993), United States federal judge
- W. Chapman Revercomb (1895–1979), American politician and lawyer in the state of West Virginia
