= 1958 United States Senate election in West Virginia =

- November 4, 1958
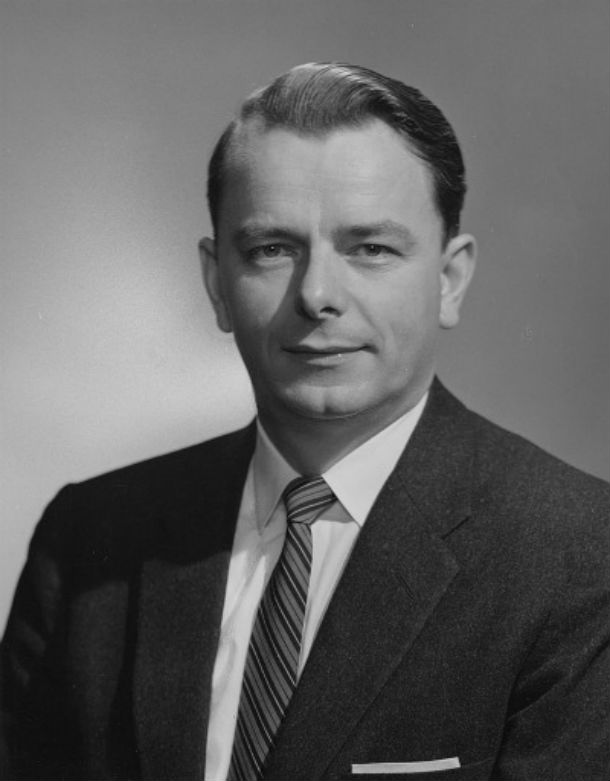

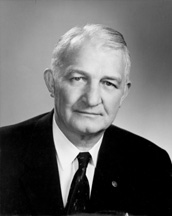
| Nominee | Robert Byrd | Chapman Revercomb |
| Party | Democratic | Republican |
| Popular vote | 381,745 | 263,172 |
| Percentage | 59.19% | 40.81% |
- County results Byrd: 50–60% 60–70% 70–80% Revercomb: 50–60% 60–70% 70–80%
U.S. senator before election
Chapman Revercomb
Republican
Elected U.S. Senator
Robert Byrd
Democratic

The 1958 United States Senate election in West Virginia was held on November 4, 1958.

In 1956, Senator Harley M. Kilgore died, and former Senator Chapman Revercomb won this seat in the 1956 special election. The election was held alongside the 1958 midterms, where Republicans had a net loss nationally. Revercomb lost re-election to incumbent Representative Robert Byrd. West Virginia was one of the many states that were flipped from Republican to Democratic in the 1958 midterms, as Democrats also flipped the other Senate seat in the state in a special election. This would be the closest race of Byrd's Senate career. Byrd would continue to hold the seat for over fifty years, until his death in 2010.

This was the last time that Democrats simultaneously flipped both of a state's Senate seats until Georgia's elections in 2020 and 2021, and the last time this would occur for either party until the 1978 elections in Minnesota.

This election, along with the simultaneous special election, is the last time a Senator from West Virginia lost re-election.

== Results ==
1958 United States Senate election in West Virginia
| Party | Candidate | Votes | % | ±% |
|---|---|---|---|---|
| Democratic | Robert Byrd | 381,745 | 59.19% | +18.39% |
| Republican | Chapman Revercomb (incumbent) | 263,172 | 40.81% | −18.39% |
| Total votes | | 644,917 | 100.00% | -21.5 |
| Democratic gain from Republican | | | | |
