= Governor Marland =

Governor Marland may refer to:

- E. W. Marland (1874–1941), 10th Governor of Oklahoma
- William C. Marland (1918–1965), 24th Governor of West Virginia
