= George Revercomb =

George Revercomb may refer to:

- George Hughes Revercomb (1929–1993), United States district judge
- George A. Revercomb (1858–1937), member of the Virginia Senate
