= 1958 United States Senate special election in West Virginia =

- November 4, 1958
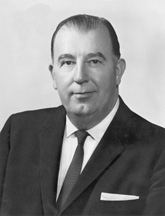

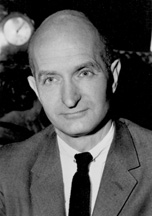
Nominee	Jennings Randolph	John D. Hoblitzell Jr.
Party	Democratic	Republican
Popular vote	374,167	256,510
Percentage	59.32%	39.77%
- County results Randolph: 50–60% 60–70% 70–80% Hoblitzell: 50–60% 60–70% 70–80%
U.S. senator before election
John D. Hoblitzell Jr.
Republican
Elected U.S. Senator
Jennings Randolph
Democratic

The 1958 United States Senate special election in West Virginia was held on November 4, 1958, concurrent with a regular election. The election was called due to the death of Senator Matthew M. Neely.

Democrats Randolph and Byrd both won their seats, amid a national wave election. This would be the last time that Democrats simultaneously flipped both of a state's Senate seats until Georgia's elections in 2020 and 2021, and the last for either party until the 1978 elections in Minnesota.

This election, along with the simultaneous regular election, is the last time a Senator from West Virginia lost re-election.

== Democratic primary ==
=== Candidates ===
- Jennings Randolph of Elkins, member of the U.S. House for the 2nd district, 1933 - 1947.
- William C. Marland of Charleston, Governor, 1953 - 1957.
- Arnold Vickers of Montgomery, W.V. Senate President, 1945 - 1949.
- W.R. "Squibb" Wilson of Fairmont, member of the W.V. House for Marion County, 1957 - 1958.

=== Campaign ===
While campaigning with Robert C. Byrd, Randolph was involved in a car accident, veering into oncoming traffic and killing another driver. According to the testimony of Byrd, Randolph fell asleep at the wheel and woke up shortly before hitting the other driver. Wetzel County prosecutor Jack Hawkins declined to file charges, and Byrd's insurance company settled with the victim's widow out of court, being forced to pay the full sum of Byrd's liability, $22,500.

=== Results ===
Primary results
Party	Candidate	Votes	%
Democratic	Jennings Randolph	102,547	47.16%
Democratic	William C. Marland	77,901	35.82%
Democratic	Arnold Vickers	25,439	11.70%
Democratic	Squibb Wilson	11,540	5.31%
Total votes		217,427	100.00%

== Republican primary ==
=== Candidates ===
- John D. Hoblitzell, Jr. of Ravenswood, interim U.S. Senator, 1958 - 1958.

=== Results ===
Republican primary
Party	Candidate	Votes	%
Republican	John D. Hoblitzell, Jr. (incumbent)	82,094	100.00%
Total votes		82,094	100.00%

== General election ==
General election
Party	Candidate	Votes	%
Democratic	Jennings Randolph	374,167	59.32%
Republican	John D. Hoblitzell, Jr. (incumbent)	256,510	39.77%
Total votes		630,677	100.00%
Democratic gain from Republican			
