= John D. Hoblitzell Jr. =

American politician (1912–1962)

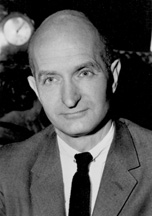

United States Senator from West Virginia
- In office January 25, 1958 – November 4, 1958
- Appointed by: Cecil H. Underwood
- Preceded by: Matthew M. Neely
- Succeeded by: Jennings Randolph

Personal details
- Born: December 30, 1912 Parkersburg, West Virginia, U.S.
- Died: January 6, 1962 (aged 49) Clarksburg, West Virginia, U.S.
- Party: Republican
- Education: West Virginia University

John Dempsey Hoblitzell Jr. (December 30, 1912 – January 6, 1962) was an American politician from West Virginia. He was a member of the Republican Party.

Hoblitzell was born in Parkersburg, West Virginia. He graduated from West Virginia University in 1934. He was involved in insurance, real estate, construction, and banking businesses. He was active in community service and civic affairs, serving as the first president of the West Virginia Junior Chamber of Commerce (1939–1940). From 1942 to 1946 he served in the United States Naval Reserve, retiring as a lieutenant.

He also served in several positions in education, including as a member board of governors of West Virginia University (1937–1944), a member of the Wood County School Board (1950–1956), a delegate to the White House Conference on Education (1954), president of the West Virginia School Boards Association (1954), and a member of the National Citizens Committee on Higher Education (1955). In addition, he was chairman of the Governor's West Virginia Commission on State and Local Finance (1954).

In 1956 Hoblitzell made an unsuccessful bid for the Republican nomination for the U.S. House of Representatives. On January 25, 1958, he was appointed to the U.S. Senate to fill the vacancy caused by the death of Matthew M. Neely. Hoblitzell sought election later in 1958 to the last two years of the term, but was defeated by his Democratic opponent, Jennings Randolph, and left office with his election loss on November 4, 1958. After leaving the Senate, he resumed his business interests.

Hoblitzell died of a heart attack in Clarksburg, West Virginia, in 1962 and was interred in Mount Olivet Cemetery in his native Parkersburg.

Party political offices
Preceded by Thomas Sweeney	Republican Party nominee for U.S. Senator from West Virginia (Class 2); 1958	Succeeded by Cecil H. Underwood
U.S. House of Representatives
Preceded by Matthew M. Neely	U.S. senator (Class 2) from West Virginia; January 25, 1958 – November 4, 1958; Served alongside: W. Chapman Revercomb	Succeeded by Jennings Randolph
