= Howard Revercomb =

American politician (1863–1949)

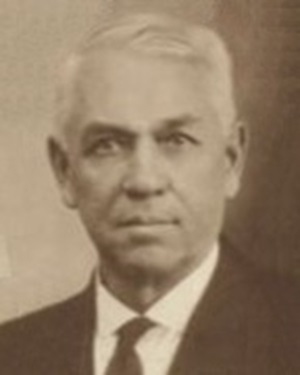
- Official portrait, 1924

Member of the Virginia House of Delegates for Alleghany and Clifton Forge
- In office January 9, 1924 – January 13, 1926
- Preceded by: Thomas B. McCaleb
- Succeeded by: Edwin Archer Snead

Personal details
- Born: Charles Howard Revercomb; July 9, 1863 Bath County, Virginia, U.S.
- Died: May 2, 1949 (aged 85) Covington, Virginia, U.S.
- Party: Republican
- Spouse: Cammie Rebecca Wills (m. 1896)
- Parent: W. H. Revercomb (father)
- Relatives: George Revercomb (brother)

Charles Howard Revercomb (July 9, 1863 – May 2, 1949) was a politician, who served in the Virginia House of Delegates and as mayor of Covington, Virginia. He was the brother of George A. Revercomb.
