= Thomas Sweeney (West Virginia politician) =

American politician

Member of the West Virginia Senate from the 1st district
- In office 1939–1942

Personal details
- Born: Thomas Bell Sweeney Jr. November 18, 1903 Wheeling, West Virginia, U.S.
- Died: September 8, 1973 (aged 69) Orlando, Florida, U.S.
- Resting place: Rock Creek Cemetery; Washington, D.C.
- Party: Republican

Thomas Bell Sweeney Jr. (November 18, 1903 – September 8, 1973), was an American politician from West Virginia who was a member of the Republican party.

== Early life ==
Thomas Sweeney Jr. was born in Wheeling, Ohio County, West Virginia.

His father Thomas Bell Sweeney was the Wheeling agent of the Equitable Life Assurance Society, and lived in Washington, D.C. after 1911. His grandfather was John F. Sweeney, who had founded that agency in 1887 and managed it for seven years before his death. His great-grandfather Thomas Sweeney was a prominent early industrialist in Wheeling and served in both houses of the Virginia General Assembly as a Whig. His ancestor John Bell served in the Cumberland County, Pennsylvania militia in the American Revolution.

== Political career ==
Sweeney was a member of the West Virginia Senate from the 1st District from 1939 to 1942. He was the unsuccessful Republican nominee for the United States Senate in 1940, 1946 and 1954, as well as for the United States House of Representatives from the 1st District in 1968. He was also a delegate to the Republican National Convention from West Virginia in 1948, 1956 and 1960.

== Personal life ==
Sweeney died on September 8, 1973, at Orange Memorial Hospital in Orlando, Florida. He was buried in Rock Creek Cemetery in Washington, D.C.

Party political offices
Preceded by Henry D. Hatfield	Republican nominee for U.S. Senator from West Virginia (Class 1); 1940, 1946	Succeeded by W. Chapman Revercomb
Preceded by W. Chapman Revercomb	Republican nominee for U.S. Senator from West Virginia (Class 2); 1954	Succeeded by John D. Hoblitzell
