= 1954 United States Senate election in West Virginia =

- November 2, 1954
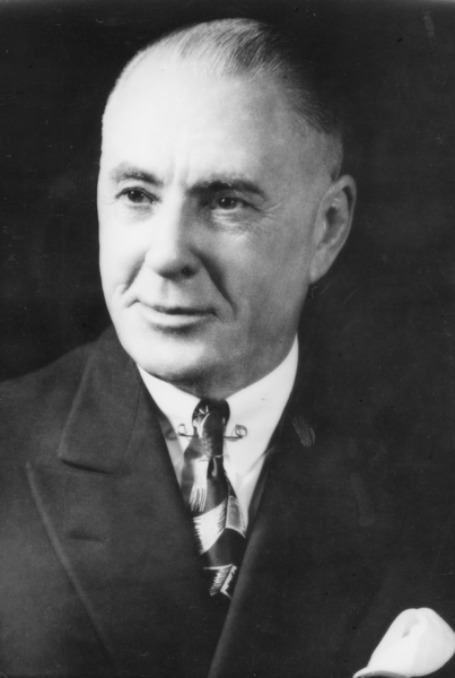

Nominee	Matthew M. Neely	Thomas Sweeney
Party	Democratic	Republican
Popular vote	325,263	268,066
Percentage	54.82%	45.18%
- County results Neely: 50–60% 60–70% 70–80% Sweeney: 50–60% 60–70% 70–80%
U.S. senator before election
Matthew M. Neely
Democratic
Elected U.S. Senator
Matthew M. Neely
Democratic

The 1954 United States Senate election in West Virginia took place on November 2, 1954. Incumbent Democratic Senator Matthew M. Neely was re-elected to a fifth term in office.

== Primary elections ==
Primary elections were held on August 3, 1954.

=== Democratic primary ===
==== Candidates ====
- Sam B. Chilton, attorney
- Homer M. May, school official
- Matthew M. Neely, incumbent U.S. Senator
- Roy A. Warden, former State Delegate

==== Results ====
Democratic primary results
Party	Candidate	Votes	%
Democratic	Matthew M. Neely (incumbent)	165,207	75.10
Democratic	Sam B. Chilton	34,288	15.59
Democratic	Homer H. May	10,270	4.67
Democratic	Roy A. Warden	10,211	4.64
Total votes		219,976	100.00

=== Republican primary ===
==== Candidates ====
- Latelle M. LaFollette, attorney and businessman, Republican candidate for West Virginia's 6th congressional district in 1950 and 1952
- Thomas Sweeney, Republican candidate for U.S. Senator in 1940 and 1946

==== Results ====
Republican primary results
Party	Candidate	Votes	%
Republican	Thomas Sweeney	72,891	66.06
Republican	Latelle M. LaFollette	37,449	33.94
Total votes		110,340	100.00

== General election ==
=== Results ===
1954 United States Senate election in West Virginia
Party	Candidate	Votes	%
Democratic	Matthew M. Neely (incumbent)	325,263	54.82
Republican	Thomas Sweeney	268,066	45.18
Majority		57,197	9.64
Turnout		593,329	
Democratic hold			

== See also ==
- 1954 United States Senate elections

== Bibliography ==
- Congressional Elections, 1946-1996. Washington, D.C.: Congressional Quarterly Inc. 1998. ISBN 1-56802-248-4.
- Myers, J. Howard (ed.). West Virginia Blue Book 1954 (PDF). Vol. 38. Charleston, West Virginia: Jarrett Printing Company.
