= List of United States senators from West Virginia =

Current delegation

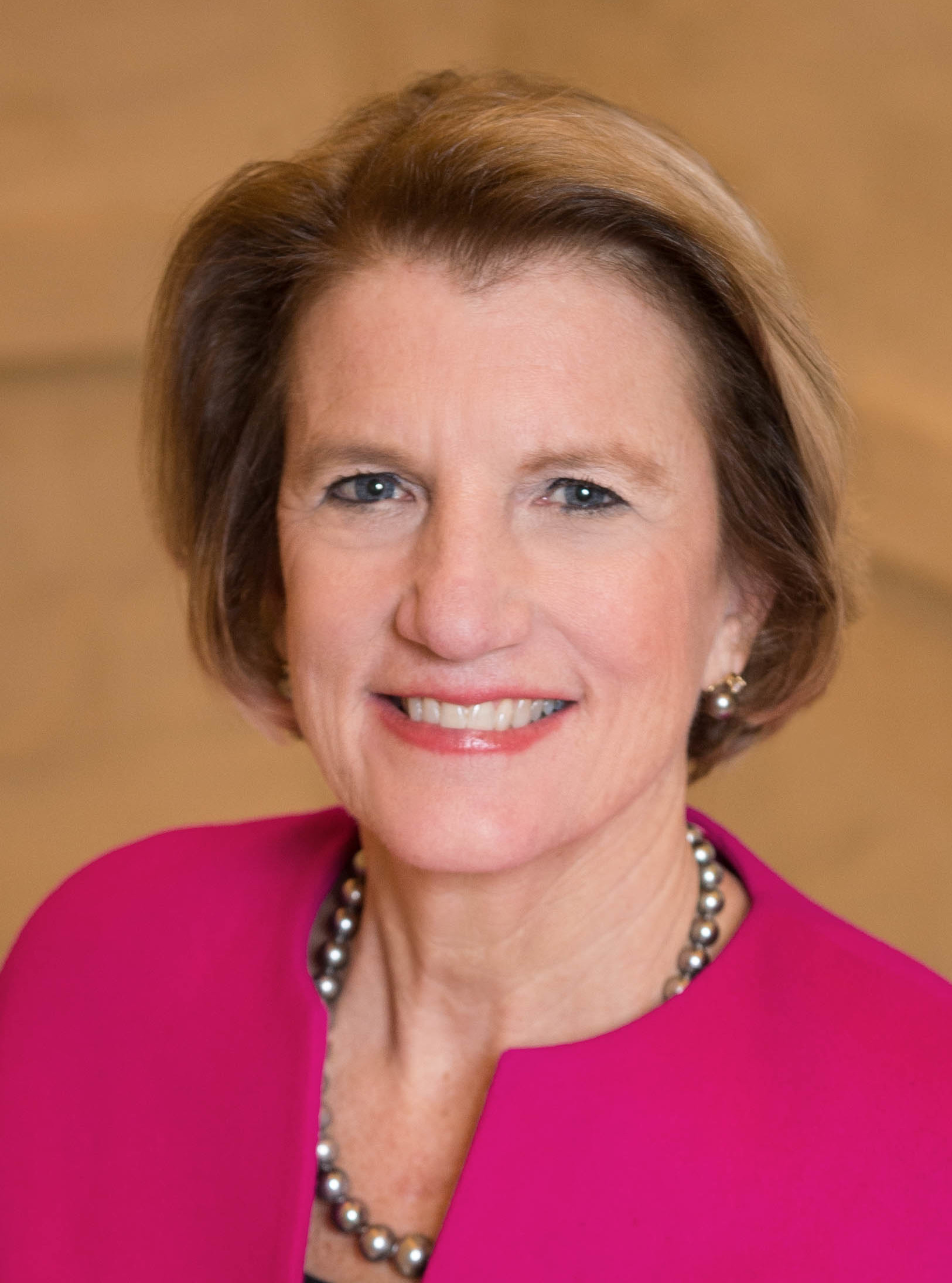
Shelley Moore Capito (R)

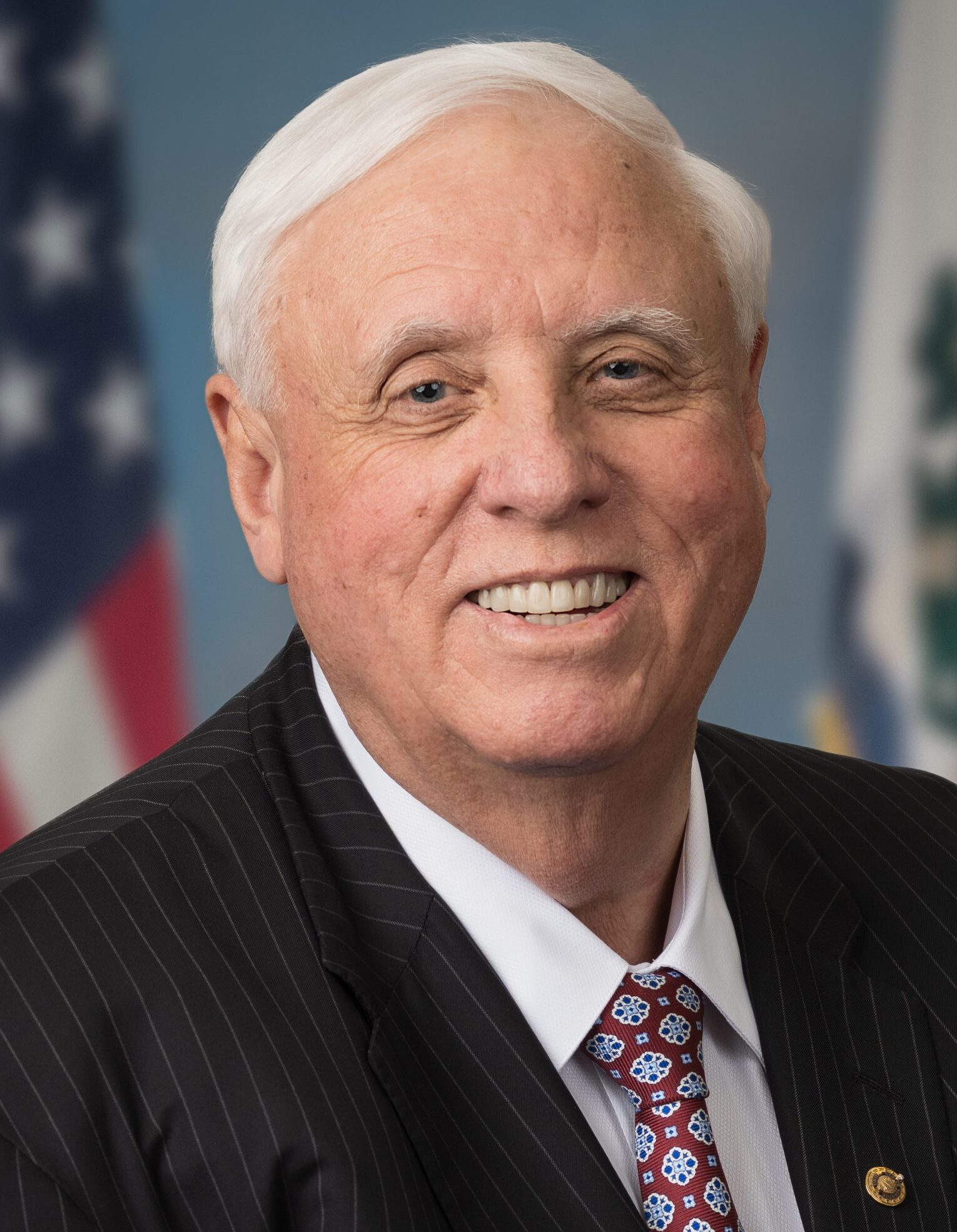
Jim Justice (R)

(ordered by seniority)

Below is a list of United States senators from West Virginia. The state's U.S. senators belong to classes 1 and 2. West Virginia is currently represented in the Senate by Republicans Shelley Moore Capito (serving since 2015), and Jim Justice (serving since 2025).

Robert Byrd was the state's longest serving senator as well as the longest in United States history, serving from 1959 until his death in 2010.

== List of senators ==
Class 1 Class 1 senators belong to the electoral cycle that most recently had regular elections in 2006, 2012, 2018, and 2024. The next election will be in 2030.						C	Class 2 Class 2 senators belong to the electoral cycle that most recently had regular elections in 2008, 2014, 2020, and 2026. The next election will be in 2032.					
#	Senator	Party	Dates in office	Electoral history	T	C	T	Electoral history	Dates in office	Party	Senator	#
Vacant			Jun 19, 1863 – Aug 4, 1863	West Virginia did not elect its first Senators until Aug 4, 1863.	1	38th	1	West Virginia did not elect its first Senators until Aug 4, 1863.	Jun 19, 1863 – Aug 4, 1863	Vacant		
1	Peter G. Van Winkle (Parkersburg)	Union	Aug 4, 1863 – Mar 3, 1869	Elected in 1863. Retired.	1	38th	1	Elected in 1863.	Aug 4, 1863 – Mar 3, 1865	Union	Waitman T. Willey (Morgantown)	1
1	Peter G. Van Winkle (Parkersburg)	Union	Aug 4, 1863 – Mar 3, 1869	Elected in 1863. Retired.	1	39th	2	Re-elected in 1865. Retired.	Mar 4, 1865 – Mar 3, 1871	Republican	Waitman T. Willey (Morgantown)	1
1	Peter G. Van Winkle (Parkersburg)	Republican	Aug 4, 1863 – Mar 3, 1869	Elected in 1863. Retired.	1	40th	2	Re-elected in 1865. Retired.	Mar 4, 1865 – Mar 3, 1871	Republican	Waitman T. Willey (Morgantown)	1
2	Arthur I. Boreman (Parkersburg)	Republican	Mar 4, 1869 – Mar 3, 1875	Elected in 1868 or 1869. Retired.	2	41st	2	Re-elected in 1865. Retired.	Mar 4, 1865 – Mar 3, 1871	Republican	Waitman T. Willey (Morgantown)	1
2	Arthur I. Boreman (Parkersburg)	Republican	Mar 4, 1869 – Mar 3, 1875	Elected in 1868 or 1869. Retired.	2	42nd	3	Elected in 1871.	Mar 4, 1871 – Mar 3, 1883	Democratic	Henry G. Davis (Piedmont)	2
2	Arthur I. Boreman (Parkersburg)	Republican	Mar 4, 1869 – Mar 3, 1875	Elected in 1868 or 1869. Retired.	2	43rd	3	Elected in 1871.	Mar 4, 1871 – Mar 3, 1883	Democratic	Henry G. Davis (Piedmont)	2
3	Allen T. Caperton (Union)	Democratic	Mar 4, 1875 – Jul 26, 1876	Elected in 1875. Died.	3	44th	3	Elected in 1871.	Mar 4, 1871 – Mar 3, 1883	Democratic	Henry G. Davis (Piedmont)	2
Vacant			Jul 26, 1876 – Aug 26, 1876		3	44th	3	Elected in 1871.	Mar 4, 1871 – Mar 3, 1883	Democratic	Henry G. Davis (Piedmont)	2
4	Samuel Price (Lewisburg)	Democratic	Aug 26, 1876 – Jan 26, 1877	Appointed to continue Caperton's term. Lost election to finish Caperton's term.	3	44th	3	Elected in 1871.	Mar 4, 1871 – Mar 3, 1883	Democratic	Henry G. Davis (Piedmont)	2
Vacant			Jan 26, 1877 – Jan 31, 1877		3	44th	3	Elected in 1871.	Mar 4, 1871 – Mar 3, 1883	Democratic	Henry G. Davis (Piedmont)	2
5	Frank Hereford (Union)	Democratic	Jan 31, 1877 – Mar 3, 1881	Elected in 1877 to finish Caperton's term.	3	44th	3	Elected in 1871.	Mar 4, 1871 – Mar 3, 1883	Democratic	Henry G. Davis (Piedmont)	2
5	Frank Hereford (Union)	Democratic	Jan 31, 1877 – Mar 3, 1881	Elected in 1877 to finish Caperton's term.	3	45th	4	Re-elected in 1877. Retired.	Mar 4, 1871 – Mar 3, 1883	Democratic	Henry G. Davis (Piedmont)	2
5	Frank Hereford (Union)	Democratic	Jan 31, 1877 – Mar 3, 1881	Elected in 1877 to finish Caperton's term.	3	46th	4	Re-elected in 1877. Retired.	Mar 4, 1871 – Mar 3, 1883	Democratic	Henry G. Davis (Piedmont)	2
6	Johnson N. Camden (Parkersburg)	Democratic	Mar 4, 1881 – Mar 3, 1887	Elected in 1880 or 1881.	4	47th	4	Re-elected in 1877. Retired.	Mar 4, 1871 – Mar 3, 1883	Democratic	Henry G. Davis (Piedmont)	2
6	Johnson N. Camden (Parkersburg)	Democratic	Mar 4, 1881 – Mar 3, 1887	Elected in 1880 or 1881.	4	48th	5	Elected in 1883.	Mar 4, 1883 – Jan 11, 1893	Democratic	John E. Kenna (Charleston)	3
6	Johnson N. Camden (Parkersburg)	Democratic	Mar 4, 1881 – Mar 3, 1887	Elected in 1880 or 1881.	4	49th	5	Elected in 1883.	Mar 4, 1883 – Jan 11, 1893	Democratic	John E. Kenna (Charleston)	3
7	Charles J. Faulkner (Martinsburg)	Democratic	Mar 4, 1887 – Mar 3, 1899	Elected in 1887.	5	50th	5	Elected in 1883.	Mar 4, 1883 – Jan 11, 1893	Democratic	John E. Kenna (Charleston)	3
7	Charles J. Faulkner (Martinsburg)	Democratic	Mar 4, 1887 – Mar 3, 1899	Elected in 1887.	5	51st	6	Re-elected in 1889. Died.	Mar 4, 1883 – Jan 11, 1893	Democratic	John E. Kenna (Charleston)	3
7	Charles J. Faulkner (Martinsburg)	Democratic	Mar 4, 1887 – Mar 3, 1899	Elected in 1887.	5	52nd	6	Re-elected in 1889. Died.	Mar 4, 1883 – Jan 11, 1893	Democratic	John E. Kenna (Charleston)	3
7	Charles J. Faulkner (Martinsburg)	Democratic	Mar 4, 1887 – Mar 3, 1899	Elected in 1887.	5	52nd	6		Jan 11, 1893 – Jan 25, 1893	Vacant		
7	Charles J. Faulkner (Martinsburg)	Democratic	Mar 4, 1887 – Mar 3, 1899	Elected in 1887.	5	52nd	6	Elected in 1893 to finish Kenna's term.	Jan 25, 1893 – Mar 3, 1895	Democratic	Johnson N. Camden (Parkersburg)	4
7	Charles J. Faulkner (Martinsburg)	Democratic	Mar 4, 1887 – Mar 3, 1899	Re-elected in 1893. Retired.	6	53rd	6	Elected in 1893 to finish Kenna's term.	Jan 25, 1893 – Mar 3, 1895	Democratic	Johnson N. Camden (Parkersburg)	4
7	Charles J. Faulkner (Martinsburg)	Democratic	Mar 4, 1887 – Mar 3, 1899	Re-elected in 1893. Retired.	6	54th	7	Elected in 1895.	Mar 4, 1895 – Jan 4, 1911	Republican	Stephen B. Elkins (Elkins)	5
7	Charles J. Faulkner (Martinsburg)	Democratic	Mar 4, 1887 – Mar 3, 1899	Re-elected in 1893. Retired.	6	55th	7	Elected in 1895.	Mar 4, 1895 – Jan 4, 1911	Republican	Stephen B. Elkins (Elkins)	5
8	Nathan B. Scott (Wheeling)	Republican	Mar 4, 1899 – Mar 3, 1911	Elected in 1899.	7	56th	7	Elected in 1895.	Mar 4, 1895 – Jan 4, 1911	Republican	Stephen B. Elkins (Elkins)	5
8	Nathan B. Scott (Wheeling)	Republican	Mar 4, 1899 – Mar 3, 1911	Elected in 1899.	7	57th	8	Re-elected in 1901.	Mar 4, 1895 – Jan 4, 1911	Republican	Stephen B. Elkins (Elkins)	5
8	Nathan B. Scott (Wheeling)	Republican	Mar 4, 1899 – Mar 3, 1911	Elected in 1899.	7	58th	8	Re-elected in 1901.	Mar 4, 1895 – Jan 4, 1911	Republican	Stephen B. Elkins (Elkins)	5
8	Nathan B. Scott (Wheeling)	Republican	Mar 4, 1899 – Mar 3, 1911	Re-elected in 1905. Lost renomination.	8	59th	8	Re-elected in 1901.	Mar 4, 1895 – Jan 4, 1911	Republican	Stephen B. Elkins (Elkins)	5
8	Nathan B. Scott (Wheeling)	Republican	Mar 4, 1899 – Mar 3, 1911	Re-elected in 1905. Lost renomination.	8	60th	9	Re-elected in 1907. Died.	Mar 4, 1895 – Jan 4, 1911	Republican	Stephen B. Elkins (Elkins)	5
8	Nathan B. Scott (Wheeling)	Republican	Mar 4, 1899 – Mar 3, 1911	Re-elected in 1905. Lost renomination.	8	61st	9	Re-elected in 1907. Died.	Mar 4, 1895 – Jan 4, 1911	Republican	Stephen B. Elkins (Elkins)	5
8	Nathan B. Scott (Wheeling)	Republican	Mar 4, 1899 – Mar 3, 1911	Re-elected in 1905. Lost renomination.	8	61st	9		Jan 4, 1911 – Jan 9, 1911	Vacant		
8	Nathan B. Scott (Wheeling)	Republican	Mar 4, 1899 – Mar 3, 1911	Re-elected in 1905. Lost renomination.	8	61st	9	Appointed to continue his father's term. Lost election to finish his father's term.	Jan 9, 1911 – Jan 31, 1911	Republican	Davis Elkins (Morgantown)	6
8	Nathan B. Scott (Wheeling)	Republican	Mar 4, 1899 – Mar 3, 1911	Re-elected in 1905. Lost renomination.	8	61st	9	Elected in 1911 to finish Stephen Elkins' term. Lost re-election.	Feb 1, 1911 – Mar 3, 1913	Democratic	Clarence W. Watson (Fairmont)	7
9	William E. Chilton (Charleston)	Democratic	Mar 4, 1911 – Mar 3, 1917	Elected in 1911. Lost re-election.	9	62nd	9	Elected in 1911 to finish Stephen Elkins' term. Lost re-election.	Feb 1, 1911 – Mar 3, 1913	Democratic	Clarence W. Watson (Fairmont)	7
9	William E. Chilton (Charleston)	Democratic	Mar 4, 1911 – Mar 3, 1917	Elected in 1911. Lost re-election.	9	63rd	10		Mar 4, 1913 – Apr 1, 1913	Vacant		
9	William E. Chilton (Charleston)	Democratic	Mar 4, 1911 – Mar 3, 1917	Elected in 1911. Lost re-election.	9	63rd	10	Elected in 1913 but took office late. Retired.	Apr 1, 1913 – Mar 3, 1919	Republican	Nathan Goff Jr. (Clarksburg)	8
9	William E. Chilton (Charleston)	Democratic	Mar 4, 1911 – Mar 3, 1917	Elected in 1911. Lost re-election.	9	64th	10	Elected in 1913 but took office late. Retired.	Apr 1, 1913 – Mar 3, 1919	Republican	Nathan Goff Jr. (Clarksburg)	8
10	Howard Sutherland (Elkins)	Republican	Mar 4, 1917 – Mar 3, 1923	Elected in 1916. Lost re-election.	10	65th	10	Elected in 1913 but took office late. Retired.	Apr 1, 1913 – Mar 3, 1919	Republican	Nathan Goff Jr. (Clarksburg)	8
10	Howard Sutherland (Elkins)	Republican	Mar 4, 1917 – Mar 3, 1923	Elected in 1916. Lost re-election.	10	66th	11	Elected in 1918. Retired.	Mar 4, 1919 – Mar 3, 1925	Republican	Davis Elkins (Morgantown)	9
10	Howard Sutherland (Elkins)	Republican	Mar 4, 1917 – Mar 3, 1923	Elected in 1916. Lost re-election.	10	67th	11	Elected in 1918. Retired.	Mar 4, 1919 – Mar 3, 1925	Republican	Davis Elkins (Morgantown)	9
11	Matthew M. Neely (Fairmont)	Democratic	Mar 4, 1923 – Mar 3, 1929	Elected in 1922. Lost re-election.	11	68th	11	Elected in 1918. Retired.	Mar 4, 1919 – Mar 3, 1925	Republican	Davis Elkins (Morgantown)	9
11	Matthew M. Neely (Fairmont)	Democratic	Mar 4, 1923 – Mar 3, 1929	Elected in 1922. Lost re-election.	11	69th	12	Elected in 1924. Retired.	Mar 4, 1925 – Mar 3, 1931	Republican	Guy D. Goff (Clarksburg)	10
11	Matthew M. Neely (Fairmont)	Democratic	Mar 4, 1923 – Mar 3, 1929	Elected in 1922. Lost re-election.	11	70th	12	Elected in 1924. Retired.	Mar 4, 1925 – Mar 3, 1931	Republican	Guy D. Goff (Clarksburg)	10
12	Henry D. Hatfield (Huntington)	Republican	Mar 4, 1929 – Jan 3, 1935	Elected in 1928. Lost re-election.	12	71st	12	Elected in 1924. Retired.	Mar 4, 1925 – Mar 3, 1931	Republican	Guy D. Goff (Clarksburg)	10
12	Henry D. Hatfield (Huntington)	Republican	Mar 4, 1929 – Jan 3, 1935	Elected in 1928. Lost re-election.	12	72nd	13	Elected in 1930.	Mar 4, 1931 – Jan 12, 1941	Democratic	Matthew M. Neely (Fairmont)	11
12	Henry D. Hatfield (Huntington)	Republican	Mar 4, 1929 – Jan 3, 1935	Elected in 1928. Lost re-election.	12	73rd	13	Elected in 1930.	Mar 4, 1931 – Jan 12, 1941	Democratic	Matthew M. Neely (Fairmont)	11
Vacant			Jan 3, 1935 – Jun 21, 1935	Senator-elect was not yet qualified to serve.	13	74th	13	Elected in 1930.	Mar 4, 1931 – Jan 12, 1941	Democratic	Matthew M. Neely (Fairmont)	11
13	Rush Holt Sr. (Weston)	Democratic	Jun 21, 1935 – Jan 3, 1941	Elected in 1934. Could not take seat until 2 days after reaching age 30 on Jun 19, 1935. Lost renomination.	13	74th	13	Elected in 1930.	Mar 4, 1931 – Jan 12, 1941	Democratic	Matthew M. Neely (Fairmont)	11
13	Rush Holt Sr. (Weston)	Democratic	Jun 21, 1935 – Jan 3, 1941	Elected in 1934. Could not take seat until 2 days after reaching age 30 on Jun 19, 1935. Lost renomination.	13	75th	14	Re-elected in 1936. Resigned.	Mar 4, 1931 – Jan 12, 1941	Democratic	Matthew M. Neely (Fairmont)	11
13	Rush Holt Sr. (Weston)	Democratic	Jun 21, 1935 – Jan 3, 1941	Elected in 1934. Could not take seat until 2 days after reaching age 30 on Jun 19, 1935. Lost renomination.	13	76th	14	Re-elected in 1936. Resigned.	Mar 4, 1931 – Jan 12, 1941	Democratic	Matthew M. Neely (Fairmont)	11
14	Harley M. Kilgore (Beckley)	Democratic	Jan 3, 1941 – Feb 28, 1956	Elected in 1940.	14	77th	14	Re-elected in 1936. Resigned.	Mar 4, 1931 – Jan 12, 1941	Democratic	Matthew M. Neely (Fairmont)	11
14	Harley M. Kilgore (Beckley)	Democratic	Jan 3, 1941 – Feb 28, 1956	Elected in 1940.	14	77th	14	Appointed to continue Neely's term. Lost election to finish Neely's term.	Jan 13, 1941 – Nov 17, 1942	Democratic	Joseph Rosier (Fairmont)	12
14	Harley M. Kilgore (Beckley)	Democratic	Jan 3, 1941 – Feb 28, 1956	Elected in 1940.	14	77th	14	Elected in 1942 to finish Neely's term. Retired.	Nov 18, 1942 – Jan 3, 1943	Republican	Hugh I. Shott (Bluefield)	13
14	Harley M. Kilgore (Beckley)	Democratic	Jan 3, 1941 – Feb 28, 1956	Elected in 1940.	14	78th	15	Elected in 1942. Lost re-election.	Jan 3, 1943 – Jan 3, 1949	Republican	Chapman Revercomb (Charleston)	14
14	Harley M. Kilgore (Beckley)	Democratic	Jan 3, 1941 – Feb 28, 1956	Elected in 1940.	14	79th	15	Elected in 1942. Lost re-election.	Jan 3, 1943 – Jan 3, 1949	Republican	Chapman Revercomb (Charleston)	14
14	Harley M. Kilgore (Beckley)	Democratic	Jan 3, 1941 – Feb 28, 1956	Re-elected in 1946.	15	80th	15	Elected in 1942. Lost re-election.	Jan 3, 1943 – Jan 3, 1949	Republican	Chapman Revercomb (Charleston)	14
14	Harley M. Kilgore (Beckley)	Democratic	Jan 3, 1941 – Feb 28, 1956	Re-elected in 1946.	15	81st	16	Elected in 1948.	Jan 3, 1949 – Jan 18, 1958	Democratic	Matthew M. Neely (Fairmont)	15
14	Harley M. Kilgore (Beckley)	Democratic	Jan 3, 1941 – Feb 28, 1956	Re-elected in 1946.	15	82nd	16	Elected in 1948.	Jan 3, 1949 – Jan 18, 1958	Democratic	Matthew M. Neely (Fairmont)	15
14	Harley M. Kilgore (Beckley)	Democratic	Jan 3, 1941 – Feb 28, 1956	Re-elected in 1952. Died.	16	83rd	16	Elected in 1948.	Jan 3, 1949 – Jan 18, 1958	Democratic	Matthew M. Neely (Fairmont)	15
14	Harley M. Kilgore (Beckley)	Democratic	Jan 3, 1941 – Feb 28, 1956	Re-elected in 1952. Died.	16	84th	17	Re-elected in 1954. Died.	Jan 3, 1949 – Jan 18, 1958	Democratic	Matthew M. Neely (Fairmont)	15
Vacant			Feb 28, 1956 – Mar 13, 1956		16	84th	17	Re-elected in 1954. Died.	Jan 3, 1949 – Jan 18, 1958	Democratic	Matthew M. Neely (Fairmont)	15
15	William Laird III (Fayetteville)	Democratic	Mar 13, 1956 – Nov 6, 1956	Appointed to continue Kilgore's term. Retired when his successor was elected.	16	84th	17	Re-elected in 1954. Died.	Jan 3, 1949 – Jan 18, 1958	Democratic	Matthew M. Neely (Fairmont)	15
16	Chapman Revercomb (Charleston)	Republican	Nov 7, 1956 – Jan 3, 1959	Elected in 1956 to finish Kilgore's term. Lost re-election.	16	84th	17	Re-elected in 1954. Died.	Jan 3, 1949 – Jan 18, 1958	Democratic	Matthew M. Neely (Fairmont)	15
16	Chapman Revercomb (Charleston)	Republican	Nov 7, 1956 – Jan 3, 1959	Elected in 1956 to finish Kilgore's term. Lost re-election.	16	85th	17	Re-elected in 1954. Died.	Jan 3, 1949 – Jan 18, 1958	Democratic	Matthew M. Neely (Fairmont)	15
16	Chapman Revercomb (Charleston)	Republican	Nov 7, 1956 – Jan 3, 1959	Elected in 1956 to finish Kilgore's term. Lost re-election.	16	85th	17		Jan 18, 1958 – Jan 25, 1958	Vacant		
16	Chapman Revercomb (Charleston)	Republican	Nov 7, 1956 – Jan 3, 1959	Elected in 1956 to finish Kilgore's term. Lost re-election.	16	85th	17	Appointed to continue Neely's term. Lost election to finish Neely's term.	Jan 25, 1958 – Nov 4, 1958	Republican	John Hoblitzell (Ravenswood)	16
16	Chapman Revercomb (Charleston)	Republican	Nov 7, 1956 – Jan 3, 1959	Elected in 1956 to finish Kilgore's term. Lost re-election.	16	85th	17	Elected in 1958 to finish Neely's term.	Nov 5, 1958 – Jan 3, 1985	Democratic	Jennings Randolph (Elkins)	17
17	Robert Byrd (Sophia)	Democratic	Jan 3, 1959 – Jun 28, 2010	Elected in 1958.	17	86th	17	Elected in 1958 to finish Neely's term.	Nov 5, 1958 – Jan 3, 1985	Democratic	Jennings Randolph (Elkins)	17
17	Robert Byrd (Sophia)	Democratic	Jan 3, 1959 – Jun 28, 2010	Elected in 1958.	17	87th	18	Re-elected in 1960.	Nov 5, 1958 – Jan 3, 1985	Democratic	Jennings Randolph (Elkins)	17
17	Robert Byrd (Sophia)	Democratic	Jan 3, 1959 – Jun 28, 2010	Elected in 1958.	17	88th	18	Re-elected in 1960.	Nov 5, 1958 – Jan 3, 1985	Democratic	Jennings Randolph (Elkins)	17
17	Robert Byrd (Sophia)	Democratic	Jan 3, 1959 – Jun 28, 2010	Re-elected in 1964.	18	89th	18	Re-elected in 1960.	Nov 5, 1958 – Jan 3, 1985	Democratic	Jennings Randolph (Elkins)	17
17	Robert Byrd (Sophia)	Democratic	Jan 3, 1959 – Jun 28, 2010	Re-elected in 1964.	18	90th	19	Re-elected in 1966.	Nov 5, 1958 – Jan 3, 1985	Democratic	Jennings Randolph (Elkins)	17
17	Robert Byrd (Sophia)	Democratic	Jan 3, 1959 – Jun 28, 2010	Re-elected in 1964.	18	91st	19	Re-elected in 1966.	Nov 5, 1958 – Jan 3, 1985	Democratic	Jennings Randolph (Elkins)	17
17	Robert Byrd (Sophia)	Democratic	Jan 3, 1959 – Jun 28, 2010	Re-elected in 1970.	19	92nd	19	Re-elected in 1966.	Nov 5, 1958 – Jan 3, 1985	Democratic	Jennings Randolph (Elkins)	17
17	Robert Byrd (Sophia)	Democratic	Jan 3, 1959 – Jun 28, 2010	Re-elected in 1970.	19	93rd	20	Re-elected in 1972.	Nov 5, 1958 – Jan 3, 1985	Democratic	Jennings Randolph (Elkins)	17
17	Robert Byrd (Sophia)	Democratic	Jan 3, 1959 – Jun 28, 2010	Re-elected in 1970.	19	94th	20	Re-elected in 1972.	Nov 5, 1958 – Jan 3, 1985	Democratic	Jennings Randolph (Elkins)	17
17	Robert Byrd (Sophia)	Democratic	Jan 3, 1959 – Jun 28, 2010	Re-elected in 1976.	20	95th	20	Re-elected in 1972.	Nov 5, 1958 – Jan 3, 1985	Democratic	Jennings Randolph (Elkins)	17
17	Robert Byrd (Sophia)	Democratic	Jan 3, 1959 – Jun 28, 2010	Re-elected in 1976.	20	96th	21	Re-elected in 1978. Retired.	Nov 5, 1958 – Jan 3, 1985	Democratic	Jennings Randolph (Elkins)	17
17	Robert Byrd (Sophia)	Democratic	Jan 3, 1959 – Jun 28, 2010	Re-elected in 1976.	20	97th	21	Re-elected in 1978. Retired.	Nov 5, 1958 – Jan 3, 1985	Democratic	Jennings Randolph (Elkins)	17
17	Robert Byrd (Sophia)	Democratic	Jan 3, 1959 – Jun 28, 2010	Re-elected in 1982.	21	98th	21	Re-elected in 1978. Retired.	Nov 5, 1958 – Jan 3, 1985	Democratic	Jennings Randolph (Elkins)	17
17	Robert Byrd (Sophia)	Democratic	Jan 3, 1959 – Jun 28, 2010	Re-elected in 1982.	21	99th	22		Jan 3, 1985 – Jan 15, 1985	Vacant		
17	Robert Byrd (Sophia)	Democratic	Jan 3, 1959 – Jun 28, 2010	Re-elected in 1982.	21	99th	22	Elected in 1984. Seated late to complete his term as Governor of West Virginia.	Jan 15, 1985 – Jan 3, 2015	Democratic	Jay Rockefeller (Charleston)	18
17	Robert Byrd (Sophia)	Democratic	Jan 3, 1959 – Jun 28, 2010	Re-elected in 1982.	21	100th	22	Elected in 1984. Seated late to complete his term as Governor of West Virginia.	Jan 15, 1985 – Jan 3, 2015	Democratic	Jay Rockefeller (Charleston)	18
17	Robert Byrd (Sophia)	Democratic	Jan 3, 1959 – Jun 28, 2010	Re-elected in 1988.	22	101st	22	Elected in 1984. Seated late to complete his term as Governor of West Virginia.	Jan 15, 1985 – Jan 3, 2015	Democratic	Jay Rockefeller (Charleston)	18
17	Robert Byrd (Sophia)	Democratic	Jan 3, 1959 – Jun 28, 2010	Re-elected in 1988.	22	102nd	23	Re-elected in 1990.	Jan 15, 1985 – Jan 3, 2015	Democratic	Jay Rockefeller (Charleston)	18
17	Robert Byrd (Sophia)	Democratic	Jan 3, 1959 – Jun 28, 2010	Re-elected in 1988.	22	103rd	23	Re-elected in 1990.	Jan 15, 1985 – Jan 3, 2015	Democratic	Jay Rockefeller (Charleston)	18
17	Robert Byrd (Sophia)	Democratic	Jan 3, 1959 – Jun 28, 2010	Re-elected in 1994.	23	104th	23	Re-elected in 1990.	Jan 15, 1985 – Jan 3, 2015	Democratic	Jay Rockefeller (Charleston)	18
17	Robert Byrd (Sophia)	Democratic	Jan 3, 1959 – Jun 28, 2010	Re-elected in 1994.	23	105th	24	Re-elected in 1996.	Jan 15, 1985 – Jan 3, 2015	Democratic	Jay Rockefeller (Charleston)	18
17	Robert Byrd (Sophia)	Democratic	Jan 3, 1959 – Jun 28, 2010	Re-elected in 1994.	23	106th	24	Re-elected in 1996.	Jan 15, 1985 – Jan 3, 2015	Democratic	Jay Rockefeller (Charleston)	18
17	Robert Byrd (Sophia)	Democratic	Jan 3, 1959 – Jun 28, 2010	Re-elected in 2000.	24	107th	24	Re-elected in 1996.	Jan 15, 1985 – Jan 3, 2015	Democratic	Jay Rockefeller (Charleston)	18
17	Robert Byrd (Sophia)	Democratic	Jan 3, 1959 – Jun 28, 2010	Re-elected in 2000.	24	108th	25	Re-elected in 2002.	Jan 15, 1985 – Jan 3, 2015	Democratic	Jay Rockefeller (Charleston)	18
17	Robert Byrd (Sophia)	Democratic	Jan 3, 1959 – Jun 28, 2010	Re-elected in 2000.	24	109th	25	Re-elected in 2002.	Jan 15, 1985 – Jan 3, 2015	Democratic	Jay Rockefeller (Charleston)	18
17	Robert Byrd (Sophia)	Democratic	Jan 3, 1959 – Jun 28, 2010	Re-elected in 2006. Died.	25	110th	25	Re-elected in 2002.	Jan 15, 1985 – Jan 3, 2015	Democratic	Jay Rockefeller (Charleston)	18
17	Robert Byrd (Sophia)	Democratic	Jan 3, 1959 – Jun 28, 2010	Re-elected in 2006. Died.	25	111th	26	Re-elected in 2008. Retired.	Jan 15, 1985 – Jan 3, 2015	Democratic	Jay Rockefeller (Charleston)	18
Vacant			Jun 28, 2010 – Jul 16, 2010		25	111th	26	Re-elected in 2008. Retired.	Jan 15, 1985 – Jan 3, 2015	Democratic	Jay Rockefeller (Charleston)	18
18	Carte Goodwin (Charleston)	Democratic	Jul 16, 2010 – Nov 15, 2010	Appointed to continue Byrd's term. Retired when his successor was elected.	25	111th	26	Re-elected in 2008. Retired.	Jan 15, 1985 – Jan 3, 2015	Democratic	Jay Rockefeller (Charleston)	18
19	Joe Manchin (Fairmont)	Democratic	Nov 15, 2010 – Jan 3, 2025	Elected in 2010 to finish Byrd's term.	25	111th	26	Re-elected in 2008. Retired.	Jan 15, 1985 – Jan 3, 2015	Democratic	Jay Rockefeller (Charleston)	18
19	Joe Manchin (Fairmont)	Democratic	Nov 15, 2010 – Jan 3, 2025	Elected in 2010 to finish Byrd's term.	25	112th	26	Re-elected in 2008. Retired.	Jan 15, 1985 – Jan 3, 2015	Democratic	Jay Rockefeller (Charleston)	18
19	Joe Manchin (Fairmont)	Democratic	Nov 15, 2010 – Jan 3, 2025	Re-elected in 2012.	26	113th	26	Re-elected in 2008. Retired.	Jan 15, 1985 – Jan 3, 2015	Democratic	Jay Rockefeller (Charleston)	18
19	Joe Manchin (Fairmont)	Democratic	Nov 15, 2010 – Jan 3, 2025	Re-elected in 2012.	26	114th	27	Elected in 2014.	Jan 3, 2015 – present	Republican	Shelley Moore Capito (Charleston)	19
19	Joe Manchin (Fairmont)	Democratic	Nov 15, 2010 – Jan 3, 2025	Re-elected in 2012.	26	115th	27	Elected in 2014.	Jan 3, 2015 – present	Republican	Shelley Moore Capito (Charleston)	19
19	Joe Manchin (Fairmont)	Democratic	Nov 15, 2010 – Jan 3, 2025	Re-elected in 2018. Left the Democratic Party on May 31, 2024. Retired.	27	116th	27	Elected in 2014.	Jan 3, 2015 – present	Republican	Shelley Moore Capito (Charleston)	19
19	Joe Manchin (Fairmont)	Democratic	Nov 15, 2010 – Jan 3, 2025	Re-elected in 2018. Left the Democratic Party on May 31, 2024. Retired.	27	117th	28	Re-elected in 2020.	Jan 3, 2015 – present	Republican	Shelley Moore Capito (Charleston)	19
19	Joe Manchin (Fairmont)	Democratic	Nov 15, 2010 – Jan 3, 2025	Re-elected in 2018. Left the Democratic Party on May 31, 2024. Retired.	27	118th	28	Re-elected in 2020.	Jan 3, 2015 – present	Republican	Shelley Moore Capito (Charleston)	19
19	Joe Manchin (Fairmont)	Independent	Nov 15, 2010 – Jan 3, 2025	Re-elected in 2018. Left the Democratic Party on May 31, 2024. Retired.	27	118th	28	Re-elected in 2020.	Jan 3, 2015 – present	Republican	Shelley Moore Capito (Charleston)	19
Vacant			Jan 3, 2025 – Jan 14, 2025		28	119th	28	Re-elected in 2020.	Jan 3, 2015 – present	Republican	Shelley Moore Capito (Charleston)	19
20	Jim Justice (Lewisburg)	Republican	Jan 14, 2025 – present	Elected in 2024. Seated late to complete his term as Governor of West Virginia.	28	119th	28	Re-elected in 2020.	Jan 3, 2015 – present	Republican	Shelley Moore Capito (Charleston)	19
20	Jim Justice (Lewisburg)	Republican	Jan 14, 2025 – present	Elected in 2024. Seated late to complete his term as Governor of West Virginia.	28	120th	29	Re-elected in 2026.	Jan 3, 2015 – present	Republican	Shelley Moore Capito (Charleston)	19
20	Jim Justice (Lewisburg)	Republican	Jan 14, 2025 – present	Elected in 2024. Seated late to complete his term as Governor of West Virginia.	28	121st	29	Re-elected in 2026.	Jan 3, 2015 – present	Republican	Shelley Moore Capito (Charleston)	19
To be determined in the 2030 election.					29	122nd	29	Re-elected in 2026.	Jan 3, 2015 – present	Republican	Shelley Moore Capito (Charleston)	19

== See also ==
- Elections in West Virginia
- List of United States representatives from West Virginia
- West Virginia's congressional delegations
