= William Laird III =

American politician

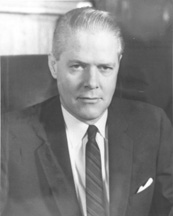

United States Senator from West Virginia
- In office March 13, 1956 – November 6, 1956
- Appointed by: William C. Marland
- Preceded by: Harley M. Kilgore
- Succeeded by: Chapman Revercomb

Personal details
- Born: William Ramsey Laird III; June 2, 1916 Keswick, California, U.S.
- Died: January 7, 1974 (aged 57) Montgomery, West Virginia, U.S.
- Party: Democratic
- Spouse: Clara Cooke
- Children: 3, including William IV
- Education: Greenbrier Military School; King College; West Virginia University

Military service
- Allegiance: United States
- Branch/service: United States Navy
- Battles/wars: World War II

William Ramsey Laird III (June 2, 1916 – January 7, 1974) was a United States senator from West Virginia. Born in Keswick, California, he was educated in the public schools. He graduated from Greenbrier Military School, King College (in Bristol, Tennessee) and from West Virginia University in 1944. During the Second World War he served in the United States Navy. He was admitted to the bar in 1944 and commenced the practice of law in West Virginia; he was a member of West Virginia Board of Education in 1955 and a member of the board of directors of Merchants National Bank, Montgomery, West Virginia and the Upper Kanawha Valley Development Association. He was a member of the board of trustees of the Laird Foundation in Montgomery and was State tax commissioner in 1955–1956, when he resigned, having been appointed to the U.S. Senate on March 13, 1956, to fill the vacancy caused by the death of Harley M. Kilgore. A Democrat, he served from March 13, 1956, to November 6, 1956. He was not a candidate for election to fill the vacancy and resumed the practice of law in Fayetteville and Montgomery.

Laird died in Montgomery in 1974; his remains were interred in Huse Memorial Park, Fayetteville.

He had three children, including William Laird IV.

U.S. Senate
Preceded by Harley M. Kilgore	Class 1 U.S. Senator from West Virginia; 1956	Succeeded by W. Chapman Revercomb
