= Brown, West Virginia =

Unincorporated community in West Virginia, US

Coordinates: 39°23′15.3″N 80°27′39.4″W

Brown is an unincorporated community in Harrison County, in the U.S. state of West Virginia.

== History ==
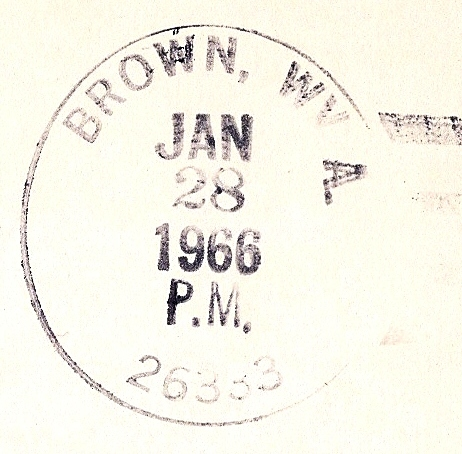
Brown WV postmark with its now retired 26333 ZIP Code

It was in 1790 that the first white settlers took up permanent residence on Little Tenmile Creek at what would become the community of Brown. These were James Kelly (1760–1810) and his wife Elizabeth (Swiger) Kelly (1764–1824). Initially, the settlement was known as "Brown's Mills", but a post office shortening the name to "Brown" was established in 1894, and remained in operation until 1966. The community derives its name from John Brown, an early settler and the proprietor of local grist mills.
