= George A. Revercomb =

American politician (1858–1937)

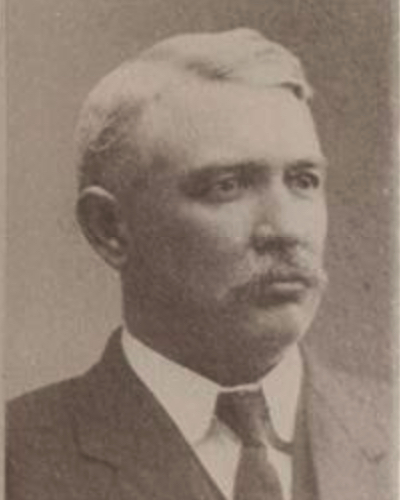
- Official portrait, 1903

Member of the Virginia Senate from the 7th district
- In office December 4, 1901 – January 10, 1906
- Preceded by: A. Nash Johnston
- Succeeded by: Harvey L. Garrett

Commonwealth's Attorney for Alleghany County
- In office 1895–1901
- Preceded by: William E. Allen
- Succeeded by: William E. Allen

Personal details
- Born: George Anderson Revercomb; October 18, 1858 Bath County, Virginia, U.S.
- Died: January 8, 1937 (aged 78) Covington, Virginia, U.S.
- Party: Republican
- Spouse: Elizabeth Forrer Chapman (m. 1894)
- Children: 6, including Chapman
- Parent: W. H. Revercomb (father)
- Relatives: Howard Revercomb (brother)
- Education: University of Virginia (LLB)
- Occupation: Lawyer; politician

George Anderson Revercomb (October 18, 1858 – January 8, 1937) was an American lawyer and politician, who served as commonwealth's attorney for Alleghany County, Virginia and as a member of the Virginia Senate. A member of the Republican Party, he ran for Congress in Virginia's 10th congressional district in 1904 and 1914, losing both times to incumbent Henry D. Flood. He was also his party's nominee for Attorney General of Virginia in 1905 and 1909. His son, Chapman Revercomb was a United States Senator from West Virginia.

Senate of Virginia
Preceded by A. Nash Johnston	Virginia Senator for the 7th District; 1901–1906	Succeeded by Harvey L. Garrett
Party political offices
Preceded by D. Lawrence Groner	Republican nominee for Attorney General of Virginia; 1905, 1909	In abeyance No Republican nominee in 1913 Title next held by Harry Wolcott
