= William C. Marland =

American politician

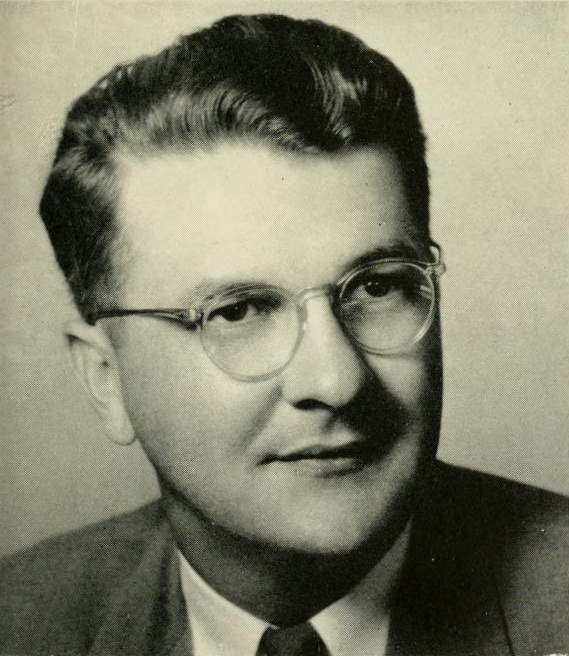
- Marland from The Monticola, 1955

24th Governor of West Virginia
- In office January 19, 1953 – January 14, 1957
- Preceded by: Okey Patteson
- Succeeded by: Cecil H. Underwood

24th Attorney General of West Virginia
- In office December 1, 1949 – February 1, 1952
- Governor: Okey Patteson
- Preceded by: Ira J. Partlow
- Succeeded by: Chauncey Browning Sr.

Personal details
- Born: William Casey Marland; March 26, 1918 Johnston City, Illinois
- Died: November 26, 1965 (aged 47) Barrington, Illinois
- Party: Democratic
- Spouse: Valerie Allen Marland
- Children: 4
- Education: University of Alabama; West Virginia University (LLB)
- Profession: Politician, Attorney

Military service
- Allegiance: United States
- Branch/service: United States Navy
- Battles/wars: World War II: Pacific Theater

William Casey Marland (March 26, 1918 – November 26, 1965), a Democrat, was the 24th governor of West Virginia from 1953 to 1957. He is best known for his early attempts to tax companies that depleted the state's natural resources, especially coal, as well as overseeing implementation of school desegregation during the Civil Rights Movement when other Southern governors opposed it. Near the end of his life, he re-entered the public stage when a reporter found him driving a cab in Chicago. He responded to the negative publicity by making a public statement to the media about his recovery from alcoholism and indicated that his new, relatively humble job helped in that recovery.

== Early life ==
Son of a mining boss, Joseph Wesley and Maude Casey Marland, he was born in Johnston City, Illinois on March 26, 1918. His family moved to the coal town of Glen Rogers in Wyoming County, West Virginia when he was seven. During World War II, he served as a Navy lieutenant in the Pacific theater, completing four tours. He attended the University of Alabama, where he was a star football player, and received a law degree from West Virginia University in 1947.

== Career ==
In West Virginia, Marland was appointed law clerk to Federal Judge Ben Moore, and in August 1948, he was appointed the state's Assistant Attorney General. Upon resignation of former Attorney General Ira J. Partlow December 1, 1949, he was appointed Attorney General. In November 1950, he was elected to the office. He announced his resignation on January 30, 1952 to run for election as governor later that year, his resignation taking effect the next day.

He beat former Senator Rush Holt by slightly more than 3% in the 1952 gubernatorial race. As Governor, Marland advocated the desegregation of schools, expansion of the state parks and other recreational facilities, improved unemployment and workers' compensation laws, and an industrial development program.

He ran for the 1956 special election for Senator. He lost the election to former Senator William Chapman Revercomb. In 1958 he ran for the Democratic primary to another special Senate election, losing to Representative Jennings Randolph. After his second Senate loss, Marland worked as an attorney, eventually relocating to the Chicago area.

== Personal life ==
He married Valerie Allen Marland in 1942, and they had four children: William Allen, Susan Lynn, John Wesley, and Casey Dixon.

The pressures on Marland may have contributed to the development of alcoholism. Accusations that he drank heavily in office or at inappropriate times during the day were made by his successor as governor, Cecil Underwood.

In the early 1960s, the ex-governor gave up drinking. A few years after his recovery, he was recognized by a Chicago Daily News reporter, Margery McElheny. Marland confirmed that he had been working as a taxicab driver since August 1962, and the Daily News published the exclusive story on March 12, 1965, with the wire services following up on March 13, 1965. The story received great attention nationally. Knowing that the story was about to break and concerned about damage to his family, he called a press conference and spoke candidly about his alcoholism, how he overcame it, and his reasons for driving a taxi: to hold in check a level of ambition that may have contributed to his drinking.

His fortunes dramatically changed for the better. He was soon invited to appear on Jack Paar's television talk show, and was hired to run a West Virginia horse racing concern. But shortly thereafter, he was diagnosed with pancreatic cancer. He died of the disease in his Barrington, Illinois home, attended by his wife, children, other relatives, and family friends, on November 26, 1965. His widow followed him in death in 1977. William Marland is buried at Lacon Cemetery, Lacon, Illinois.

Party political offices
Preceded by Ira J. Partlow	Democratic nominee for West Virginia Attorney General; 1950	Succeeded by John G. Fox
Preceded by Okey Patteson	Democratic nominee for Governor of West Virginia; 1952	Succeeded by Bob Mollohan
Preceded by Harley M. Kilgore	Democratic nominee for U.S. Senator from West Virginia (Class 1); 1956	Succeeded by Robert Byrd
Legal offices
Preceded by Ira J. Partlow	Attorney General of West Virginia; 1949–1952	Succeeded by Chauncey H. Browning, Sr.
Political offices
Preceded by Okey L. Patteson	Governor of West Virginia; 1953–1957	Succeeded by Cecil H. Underwood
