= Harley M. Kilgore =

American politician

Harley Martin Kilgore
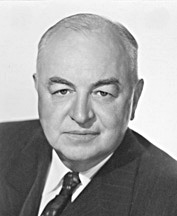

United States Senator from West Virginia
- In office January 3, 1941 – February 28, 1956
- Preceded by: Rush Holt Sr.
- Succeeded by: William Laird III

Personal details
- Born: January 11, 1893 Brown, West Virginia, U.S.
- Died: February 28, 1956 (aged 63) National Naval Medical Center, Bethesda, Maryland, U.S.
- Party: Democratic
- Profession: Lawyer, Judge, Military

Harley Martin Kilgore (January 11, 1893 – February 28, 1956) was a United States senator from West Virginia.

== Biography ==
He was born on January 11, 1893, in Brown, West Virginia. He was born to Quimby Hugh Kilgore and Laura Jo Kilgore. His father worked as an oil driller and contractor. He attended the public schools and graduated from the law department of West Virginia University at Morgantown in 1914 and was admitted to the bar the same year.

He taught school in Hancock, West Virginia in 1914 and 1915, and organized the first high school in Raleigh County, West Virginia in the latter year. He was the school's first principal for a year, and commenced the practice of law in Beckley, West Virginia in 1916. During the First World War he served in the infantry from 1917 and was discharged as a captain in 1920; in 1921 he organized the West Virginia National Guard and retired as a colonel in 1953. He was married to Lois Elaine Lilly in Huntington, West Virginia, in 1921.

He was judge of the Raleigh County criminal court from 1933 to 1940, and was elected as a Democrat to the U.S. Senate in 1940, and won re-election twice. He was a member of the Senate from January 3, 1941, until his death in Bethesda Naval Hospital in 1956. Kilgore was a member of the Truman Committee, and from October 1942, he chaired the Subcommittee on War Mobilization of the Military Affairs Committee, otherwise known as the Kilgore Committee, that oversaw U.S. mobilization efforts for World War II. He also helped establish the National Science Foundation in 1950.

Senator Kilgore was West Virginia's favorite-son candidate in 1948 Democratic presidential primaries and won his home state unopposed.

In 1950 Kilgore joined a small group of liberals, including Paul Douglas and Hubert Humphrey, trying to stop the McCarran Act of 1950. The bill was designed to suppress the American Communist Party. Kilgore proposed a substitute bill that would allow the president to lock up subversives without trial in a time of national emergency. The model was the Internment of Japanese Americans during World War II. The goal was to split the McCarran coalition, but the substitute was instead added to the bill. For years, critics charged that the liberals favored concentration camps. The ploy failed to stop the new law; the Senate voted 57 to 10 to overturn Truman's veto, with Kilgore voting against the bill and in support of the veto. Kilgore did not sign the 1956 Southern Manifesto despite school segregation being legally required in West Virginia prior to Brown v. Board of Education (1954).

Kilgore died on February 28, 1956, aged 63 and was interred in Arlington National Cemetery.

== National Science Foundation ==
In 1942, American manufacturing expert Herbert Schimmel advised Kilgore to form a committee to centralize scientific research done for the war effort. The Kilgore Committee drafted legislation for an Office of Technological Mobilization, which would have power to fund research, share patents and trade secrets, and facilities that could help the war effort. Additionally, the organization would be able to draft scientists and facilities for the war effort.

In 1943, government scientists, most notably Vannevar Bush, voiced agreement with the spirit of Kilgore's proposal, but opposed the bill's aim to involve government administration of science funding and patent sharing. As the war neared its end, many prominent scientists feared a peacetime Kilgore plan. The Kilgore Committee, in an effort to mollify scientists concerned with a government-run funding agency, proposed calling the proposed organization a Foundation, to give the superficial impression of a private, philanthropic funding body like the Rockefeller Foundation. The scientists running the war-time Office of Scientific Research and Development sought to bypass the Kilgore Committee in forming a postwar science policy. While ostensibly working with Kilgore to plan for a science administration, Vannevar Bush privately obtained an invitation from President Franklin D. Roosevelt to write his own plan for a government-funded science foundation. Senator Warren Magnuson of Washington introduced a proposal based on Bush's report, Science, the Endless Frontier, in July 1945. The report contradicted much of Kilgore's vision of a science-funding organization accountable to the government. Kilgore felt betrayed by Bush's failure to mention this alternate bill, and remained on hostile terms with Bush for years afterwards.

After many months of negotiations with interest groups of scientists and manufacturers, Kilgore and Magnuson introduced a modified bill to fund the National Science Foundation in 1946, which did not pass. At the same time, Republican Senator Alexander Smith of New Jersey introduced a bill for an agency more similar to Bush's vision. The Smith bill passed both houses of United States Congress. Kilgore encouraged his former colleague, now President Harry S. Truman to veto the Smith bill, in large part because of the potential it made for the military to dominate scientific research. Truman followed Kilgore's advice and let the bill expire through a pocket veto. Kilgore also encouraged Truman to establish a Presidential Research Board to be led by John Steelman, former Director of the War Mobilization and Reconversion, which Truman then did in October 1946.

By 1948, other agencies like the National Institutes of Health and the United States Department of Defense had been established to fund specific domains of scientific research. The National Science Foundation would now solely fund basic science. In early 1948, Truman, Steelman, and Senator Smith reached a compromise in administration of the foundation. Later that year, Kilgore and Smith cosponsored the bill that President Truman would finally sign on May 10, 1950, to establish the National Science Foundation.

== Investigations by the Sub-committee on Antitrust and Monopolies ==
While serving as Chairman of United States Senate Committee on the Judiciary, Kilgore spearheaded an investigation into corporate antitrust and monopoly.

The Kilgore Subcommittee investigations were based on the 1954 Subcommittee's recommendation for a full investigation of monopolies and concentrations of economic power.

Following its recommendations based on 1954 hearings, the Antitrust and Monopoly Subcommittee of the Senate Judiciary Committee undertook in 1955 a full-scale inquiry into antitrust policies and monopolies. Harley M. Kilgore (D W. Va.) headed the Subcommittee for which the Senate March 18 voted $200,000 for investigations."

In its 1954 report the Subcommittee warned that the United States was in the "third great merger movement" in U.S. history and that previous movements had been followed by "devastating business collapse".

After Kilgore's death, the investigations were put on hold until Estes Kefauver was appointed to the Chairmanship of the sub-committee in 1957. The investigations continued until Kefauver's death in 1963.

== See also ==
- List of members of the United States Congress who died in office (1950–1999)

== Notes ==
Party political offices
Preceded by Rush Holt Sr.	Democratic nominee for U.S. Senator from West Virginia (Class 1); 1940, 1946, 1952	Succeeded by William C. Marland
U.S. Senate
Preceded by Rush D. Holt Sr.	U.S. senator (Class 1) from West Virginia; 1941 – 1956; Served alongside: Matthew M. Neely, Joseph Rosier, Hugh Ike Shott, W. Chapman Revercomb, Matthew M. Neely	Succeeded by William R. Laird III
Political offices
Preceded by William "Wild Bill" Langer	Chairman of the Senate Judiciary Committee; 1955 – 1956	Succeeded by James O. Eastland
