= Chapman Revercomb =

American politician and lawyer (1895–1979)

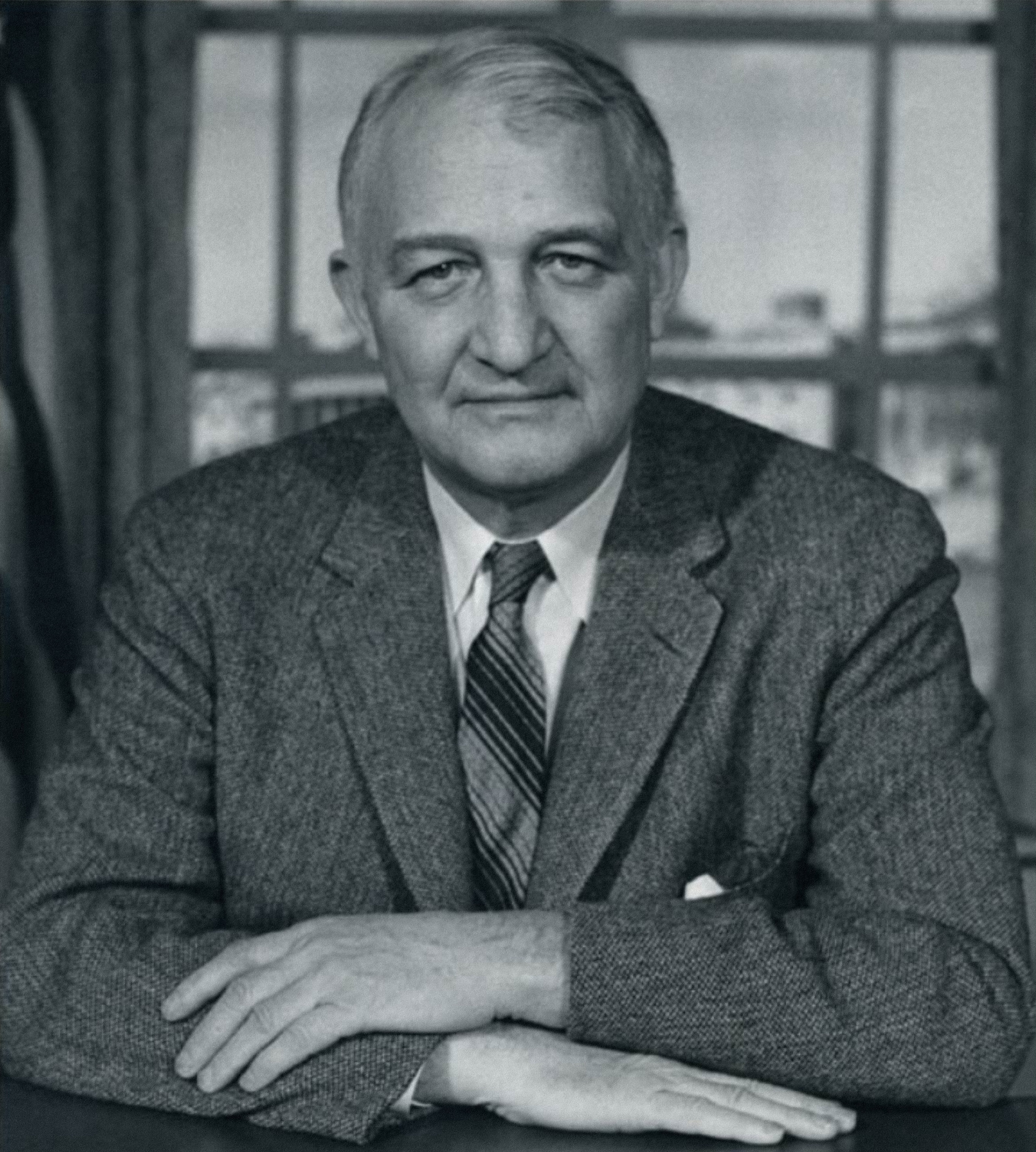
- Revercomb while serving, c. 1959

United States Senator from West Virginia
- In office November 7, 1956 – January 3, 1959
- Preceded by: William Laird III
- Succeeded by: Robert Byrd
- In office January 3, 1943 – January 3, 1949
- Preceded by: Hugh Ike Shott
- Succeeded by: Matthew M. Neely

Personal details
- Born: William Chapman Revercomb; July 20, 1895 Covington, Virginia, U.S.
- Died: October 6, 1979 (aged 84) Charleston, West Virginia, U.S.
- Party: Republican
- Spouse: Sara Venable Hughes (m. 1926)
- Children: 4, including George
- Parent: George A. Revercomb (father)

Military service
- Branch/service: United States Army
- Battles/wars: World War I

William Chapman Revercomb (July 20, 1895 – October 6, 1979) was an American politician and lawyer. A Republican, he served two separate terms in the United States Senate representing the state of West Virginia.

== Life and career ==
Revercomb was born in Covington, Virginia, the son of Elizabeth Forrer (Chapman) and George Anderson Revercomb. He attended Washington and Lee University before entering the United States Army in World War I where he served as a corporal. Returning from the war, he transferred to the law school at the University of Virginia, graduating in 1919. He practiced law in Covington for a few years before moving to Charleston, West Virginia, in 1922.

He was elected to the Senate in 1942. There he championed opposition to the foreign and domestic policies of the administration of Harry S. Truman and was a stalwart supporter of civil rights. In 1945, Revercomb was among the seven senators who opposed full United States entry into the United Nations. Revercomb was defeated for re-election in 1948 and for the state's other Senate seat in 1952. In both races, his support of the national Republican party's civil rights policies were major issues.

In 1956, he won a special election to fill the vacancy caused by the death of Harley M. Kilgore, his Democratic opponent in the 1952 election. He re-entered the Senate and served through the end of 1958. During his second tenure in the Senate, Revercomb voted in favor of the Civil Rights Act of 1957.

In 1958, he lost to Congressman Robert Byrd in a landslide. In his re-election bid in another racially charged election (Byrd held the seat until his death in 2010, becoming the first U.S. senator to serve uninterrupted for more than 50 years). He then lost the Republican nomination for governor in 1960 and retired from politics. He practiced law in Charleston until his death in 1979. He was buried in Sunset Memorial Park, South Charleston, West Virginia.

Revercomb was the last Republican to represent West Virginia in the Senate (his 1956–1959 term) until the inauguration of Shelley Moore Capito in 2015.

Party political offices
Preceded by Hugh I. Shott	Republican nominee for U.S. Senator from West Virginia (Class 2); 1942, 1948	Succeeded by Thomas B. Sweeney
Preceded by Thomas B. Sweeney	Republican nominee for U.S. Senator from West Virginia (Class 1); 1952, 1956, 1958	Succeeded by Cooper P. Benedict
U.S. Senate
Preceded by Hugh I. Shott	U.S. senator (Class 2) from West Virginia; January 3, 1943 – January 3, 1949; Served alongside: Harley M. Kilgore	Succeeded by Matthew M. Neely
Preceded by William R. Laird	U.S. senator (Class 1) from West Virginia; November 7, 1956 – January 3, 1959; Served alongside: Matthew M. Neely, John D. Hoblitzell, Jennings Randolph	Succeeded by Robert C. Byrd
