= 1952 United States Senate elections =

- September 8 (Note: In Maine) & November 4, 1952
- Class 1

35 of the 96 seats in the United States Senate 49 seats needed for a majority
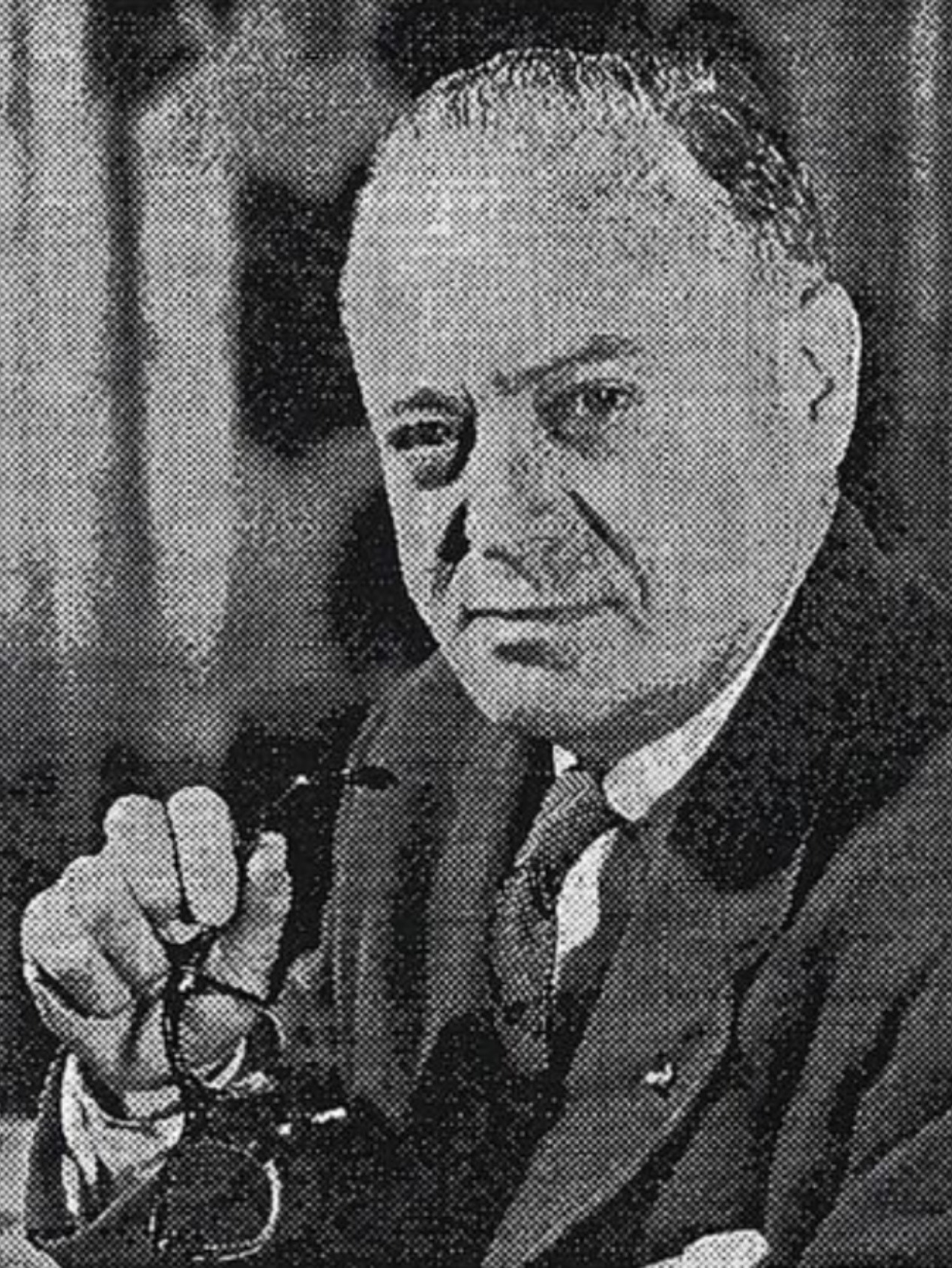

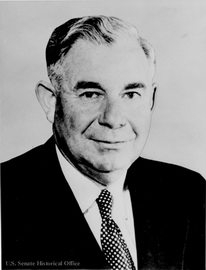
	Majority party	Minority party
Leader	Styles Bridges (Note: At the time of these elections, Styles Bridges was the Republican leader. When the new congress began, Bridges became president pro tempore of the United States Senate, while Robert A. Taft of Ohio became majority leader.)	Ernest McFarland (lost re-election)
Party	Republican	Democratic
Leader since	January 8, 1952	January 3, 1951
Leader's seat	New Hampshire	Arizona
Seats before	47	49
Seats after	49	47
Seat change	▲2	▼2
Popular vote	24,665,569	21,236,793
Percentage	52.0%	44.8%
Seats up	21	14
Races won	23	12
- Results of the elections: Democratic gain Democratic hold Republican gain Republican hold No election Rectangular inset (Conn. & Neb.): both seats up for election
Majority Leader before election
Ernest McFarland
Democratic
Elected Majority Leader
Robert A. Taft
Republican

The 1952 United States Senate elections for the United States Senate coincided with the election of Dwight D. Eisenhower to the presidency by a large margin. The 32 Senate seats of Class 1 were contested in regular elections, and three special elections were held to fill vacancies. The Republicans took control of the Senate by managing to make a net gain of two seats. However, Wayne Morse (R-OR) became an independent, forcing the Republicans to rely on Vice President Richard Nixon's tie-breaking vote. The Republicans maintained a 48–47–1 plurality. Wayne Morse caucused with the Republicans at the start of Congress's second session on January 6, 1954, to allow the GOP to remain in control of the Senate. This was the third time, as well as second consecutive, in which a sitting Senate leader lost his seat.

The 1952 United States Senate elections marked a significant shift in power, with the Republicans gaining control of the Senate by making a net gain of two seats. This was the last time the Senate changed hands in a presidential election year, and the last time the Republicans won control of the Senate, until 1980. As of 2026, this is the last time both houses simultaneously changed hands in a presidential year.

== Results summary ==
↓
47	49
Democratic	Republican

Colored shading indicates party with largest share of that row.

Parties				Total
Parties	Democratic	Republican	Other	Total
Last elections (1950) Before these elections	49	47	0	96
Not up	35	26	0	61
Up	14	21	—	35
Class 1 (1946→1952)	13	19	—	32
Special: Class 2	1	1	—	2
Special: Class 3	0	1	—	1
Incumbent retired	2	2	—	4
Held by same party	1	2	—	3
Replaced by other party	▼1 Democrat replaced by ▲1 Republican		—	1
Result	1	3	0	4
Incumbent ran	12	19	—	31
Won re-election	6	14	—	20
Lost re-election	▼4 Republicans replaced by ▲4 Democrats ▼5 Democrats replaced by ▲5 Republicans		—	9
Lost renomination but held by same party	1	1	—	2
Result	11	20	0	31
Total elected	12	23	0	35
Net change	▼2	▲2	Steady	2
Nationwide vote	21,236,793	24,665,569	1,534,837	47,437,199
Share	44.77%	52.00%	3.24%	100%
Result	47	49	0	96

Source: Clerk of the U.S. House of Representatives

== Gains, losses and holds ==
=== Retirements ===
One Republican and one Democrat retired instead of seeking re-election. One Republican and one Democrat also retired instead of finishing the unexpired term.

State	Senator	Replaced by
Connecticut (special)	William A. Purtell	Prescott Bush
Maryland	Herbert O'Conor	J. Glenn Beall
Nebraska (special)	Fred A. Seaton	Dwight Griswold
Texas	Tom Connally	Price Daniel

=== Defeats ===
Four Republicans and five Democrats sought re-election, and one Republican and one Democrat also sought election to run to finish the unexpired term or in the six-year term, but lost in the primary or general election.

State	Senator	Replaced by
Arizona	Ernest McFarland	Barry Goldwater
Connecticut (regular)	William Benton	William A. Purtell
Kentucky (special)	Thomas R. Underwood	John Sherman Cooper
Maine	Owen Brewster	Frederick G. Payne
Massachusetts	Henry Cabot Lodge Jr.	John F. Kennedy
Michigan	Blair Moody	Charles E. Potter
Missouri	James P. Kem	Stuart Symington
Montana	Zales Ecton	Mike Mansfield
Tennessee	Kenneth McKellar	Albert Gore Sr.
Washington	Harry P. Cain	Henry M. Jackson
Wyoming	Joseph C. O'Mahoney	Frank A. Barrett

=== Post-election changes ===
State	Senator	Replaced by
Oregon	Wayne Morse	Wayne Morse
Nebraska (Class 1)	Hugh A. Butler	Samuel W. Reynolds
Nebraska (Class 2)	Dwight Griswold	Eva Bowring
Nevada	Pat McCarran	Ernest S. Brown
New Hampshire	Charles W. Tobey	Robert W. Upton
North Carolina (Class 2)	Willis Smith	Alton Lennon
North Carolina (Class 3)	Clyde R. Hoey	Sam Ervin
Ohio	Robert A. Taft	Thomas A. Burke
South Carolina	Burnet R. Maybank	Charles E. Daniel
Wyoming	Lester C. Hunt	Edward D. Crippa

== Change in composition ==
=== Before the elections ===
Going into the November elections.

		D_{1}	D_{2}	D_{3}	D_{4}	D_{5}	D_{6}	D_{7}	D_{8}
D_{18}	D_{17}	D_{16}	D_{15}	D_{14}	D_{13}	D_{12}	D_{11}	D_{10}	D_{9}
D_{19}	D_{20}	D_{21}	D_{22}	D_{23}	D_{24}	D_{25}	D_{26}	D_{27}	D_{28}
D_{38} Fla. Ran	D_{37} Conn. (reg); Ran	D_{36} Ariz. Ran	D_{35}	D_{34}	D_{33}	D_{32}	D_{31}	D_{30}	D_{29}
D_{39} Ky. (sp); Ran	D_{40} Md. Ran	D_{41} Mich. (sp); Mich. (reg); Ran	D_{42} Miss. Ran	D_{43} N.M. Ran	D_{44} R.I. Ran	D_{45} Tenn. Ran	D_{46} Texas; Retired	D_{47} Va. Ran	D_{48} W.Va. Ran
Majority →									D_{49} Wyo. Ran
R_{39} N.J. Ran	R_{40} N.Y. Ran	R_{41} N.D. Ran	R_{42} Ohio; Ran	R_{43} Pa. Ran	R_{44} Utah; Ran	R_{45} Vt. Ran	R_{46} Wash. Ran	R_{47} Wis. Ran	D_{49} Wyo. Ran
R_{38} Nev. Ran	R_{37} Neb. (sp); Retired	R_{36} Neb. (reg); Ran	R_{35} Mont. Ran	R_{34} Mo. Ran	R_{33} Minn. Ran	R_{32} Mass. Ran	R_{31} Maine; Ran	R_{30} Ind. Ran	R_{29} Del. Ran
R_{19}	R_{20}	R_{21}	R_{22}	R_{23}	R_{24}	R_{25}	R_{26}	R_{27} Calif. Ran	R_{28} Conn. (sp); Retired
R_{18}	R_{17}	R_{16}	R_{15}	R_{14}	R_{13}	R_{12}	R_{11}	R_{10}	R_{9}
		R_{1}	R_{2}	R_{3}	R_{4}	R_{5}	R_{6}	R_{7}	R_{8}

=== Results of the elections ===
		D_{1}	D_{2}	D_{3}	D_{4}	D_{5}	D_{6}	D_{7}	D_{8}
D_{18}	D_{17}	D_{16}	D_{15}	D_{14}	D_{13}	D_{12}	D_{11}	D_{10}	D_{9}
D_{19}	D_{20}	D_{21}	D_{22}	D_{23}	D_{24}	D_{25}	D_{26}	D_{27}	D_{28}
D_{38} N.M. Re-elected	D_{37} Miss. Re-elected	D_{36} Fla. Re-elected	D_{35}	D_{34}	D_{33}	D_{32}	D_{31}	D_{30}	D_{29}
D_{39} R.I. Re-elected	D_{40} Tenn. Hold	D_{41} Texas; Hold	D_{42} Va. Re-elected	D_{43} W.Va. Re-elected	D_{44} Mass. Gain	D_{45} Mo. Gain	D_{46} Mont. Gain	D_{47} Wash. Gain	R_{49} Wyo. Gain
Majority →									R_{49} Wyo. Gain
R_{39} Ohio; Re-elected	R_{40} Pa. Re-elected	R_{41} Utah; Re-elected	R_{42} Vt. Re-elected	R_{43} Wis. Re-elected	R_{44} Ariz. Gain	R_{45} Conn. (reg); Gain	R_{46} Ky. (sp); Gain (Note: Appointee defeated)	R_{47} Md. Gain	R_{48} Mich. (sp); Mich. (reg); Gain
R_{38} N.D. Re-elected	R_{37} N.Y. Re-elected	R_{36} N.J. Re-elected	R_{35} Nev. Re-elected	R_{34} Neb. (sp); Hold	R_{33} Neb. (reg); Re-elected	R_{32} Minn. Re-elected	R_{31} Maine; Hold	R_{30} Ind. Re-elected	R_{29} Del. Re-elected
R_{19}	R_{20}	R_{21}	R_{22}	R_{23}	R_{24}	R_{25}	R_{26}	R_{27} Calif. Re-elected	R_{28} Conn. (sp); Hold
R_{18}	R_{17}	R_{16}	R_{15}	R_{14}	R_{13}	R_{12}	R_{11}	R_{10}	R_{9}
		R_{1}	R_{2}	R_{3}	R_{4}	R_{5}	R_{6}	R_{7}	R_{8}

=== Beginning of the next Congress ===
		D_{1}	D_{2}	D_{3}	D_{4}	D_{5}	D_{6}	D_{7}	D_{8}
D_{18}	D_{17}	D_{16}	D_{15}	D_{14}	D_{13}	D_{12}	D_{11}	D_{10}	D_{9}
D_{19}	D_{20}	D_{21}	D_{22}	D_{23}	D_{24}	D_{25}	D_{26}	D_{27}	D_{28}
D_{38}	D_{37}	D_{36}	D_{35}	D_{34}	D_{33}	D_{32}	D_{31}	D_{30}	D_{29}
D_{39}	D_{40}	D_{41}	D_{42}	D_{43}	D_{44}	D_{45}	D_{46}	D_{47}	I_{1} Ore. Changed
Majority using VP's vote ↓
R_{39}	R_{40}	R_{41}	R_{42}	R_{43}	R_{44}	R_{45}	R_{46}	R_{47}	R_{48}
R_{38}	R_{37}	R_{36}	R_{35}	R_{34}	R_{33}	R_{32}	R_{31}	R_{30}	R_{29}
R_{19}	R_{20}	R_{21}	R_{22}	R_{23}	R_{24}	R_{25}	R_{26}	R_{27}	R_{28}
R_{18}	R_{17}	R_{16}	R_{15}	R_{14}	R_{13}	R_{12}	R_{11}	R_{10}	R_{9}
		R_{1}	R_{2}	R_{3}	R_{4}	R_{5}	R_{6}	R_{7}	R_{8}

Key

D_{#}	Democratic
I_{#}	Independent
R_{#}	Republican

== Race summaries ==
=== Special elections during the 82nd Congress ===
In these special elections the winners were seated before January 3, 1953; ordered by election date, then state.

State	Incumbent			Results	Candidates
State	Senator	Party	Electoral history	Results	Candidates
Connecticut (Class 3)	William A. Purtell	Republican	1952 (Appointed)	Interim appointee retired to run for the Class 1 seat. New senator elected November 4, 1952. Republican hold.	▌ ✓ Prescott Bush (Republican) 51.2%; ▌Abraham Ribicoff (Democratic) 48.5%
Kentucky (Class 2)	Thomas R. Underwood	Democratic	1951 (Appointed)	Interim appointee lost election. New senator elected November 4, 1952. Republican gain.	▌ ✓ John Sherman Cooper (Republican) 51.5%; ▌Thomas R. Underwood (Democratic) 48.5%
Michigan (Class 1)	Blair Moody	Democratic	1951 (Appointed)	Interim appointee lost election. New senator elected November 4, 1952. Republican gain. Winner was also elected to the next term; see below.	▌ ✓ Charles E. Potter (Republican) 51.2%; ▌Blair Moody (Democratic) 48.7%
Nebraska (Class 2)	Fred A. Seaton	Republican	1951 (Appointed)	Interim appointee retired. New senator elected November 4, 1952. Republican hold.	▌ ✓ Dwight Griswold (Republican) 63.6%; ▌William Ritchie (Democratic) 36.4%

=== Races leading to the 83rd Congress ===
In these general elections, the winner was seated on January 3, 1953; ordered by state.

All of the elections involved the Class 1 seats.

State	Incumbent			Results	Candidates
State	Senator	Party	Electoral history	Results	Candidates
Arizona	Ernest McFarland	Democratic	1940; 1946	Incumbent lost re-election. New senator elected. Republican gain.	▌ ✓ Barry Goldwater (Republican) 51.3%; ▌Ernest McFarland (Democratic) 48.7%
California	William Knowland	Republican	1945 (Appointed); 1946 (special); 1946	Incumbent re-elected.	▌ ✓ William Knowland (Republican) 87.7%; ▌Reuben W. Borough (Ind. Progressive) 11.9%
Connecticut	William Benton	Democratic	1949 (Appointed); 1950 (special)	Incumbent lost re-election. New senator elected. Republican gain.	▌ ✓ William A. Purtell (Republican) 52.5%; ▌William Benton (Democratic) 44.4%
Delaware	John J. Williams	Republican	1946	Incumbent re-elected.	▌ ✓ John J. Williams (Republican) 54.5%; ▌Alexis I. du Pont Bayard (Democratic) 45.5%
Florida	Spessard Holland	Democratic	1946 (Appointed); 1946	Incumbent re-elected.	▌ ✓ Spessard Holland (Democratic) 99.8%
Indiana	William E. Jenner	Republican	1944 (special); 1944 (Retired); 1946	Incumbent re-elected.	▌ ✓ William E. Jenner (Republican) 52.4%; ▌Henry F. Schricker (Democratic) 46.8%
Maine	Owen Brewster	Republican	1940; 1946	Incumbent lost renomination. New senator elected. Republican hold. Incumbent resigned December 31, 1952.	▌ ✓ Frederick G. Payne (Republican) 58.7%; ▌Roger P. Dube (Democratic) 34.9%; ▌Earl S. Grant (Independent) 6.4%
Maryland	Herbert O'Conor	Democratic	1946	Incumbent retired. New senator elected. Republican gain.	▌ ✓ J. Glenn Beall (Republican) 52.5%; ▌George P. Mahoney (Democratic) 47.5%
Massachusetts	Henry Cabot Lodge Jr.	Republican	1936; 1942; 1944 (Resigned); 1946	Incumbent lost re-election. New senator elected. Democratic gain.	▌ ✓ John F. Kennedy (Democratic) 51.4%; ▌Henry Cabot Lodge Jr. (Republican) 48.4%
Michigan	Blair Moody	Democratic	1951 (Appointed)	Interim appointee lost election. New senator elected. Republican gain Winner was also elected to finish the term; see above.	▌ ✓ Charles E. Potter (Republican) 50.6%; ▌Blair Moody (Democratic) 49.0%
Minnesota	Edward J. Thye	Republican	1946	Incumbent re-elected.	▌ ✓ Edward J. Thye (Republican) 56.6%; ▌William E. Carlson (DFL) 42.5%
Mississippi	John C. Stennis	Democratic	1947 (special)	Incumbent re-elected.	▌ ✓ John C. Stennis (Democratic); Unopposed
Missouri	James P. Kem	Republican	1946	Incumbent lost re-election. New senator elected. Democratic gain.	▌ ✓ Stuart Symington (Democratic) 54.0%; ▌James P. Kem (Republican) 45.9%
Montana	Zales Ecton	Republican	1946	Incumbent lost re-election. New senator elected. Democratic gain.	▌ ✓ Mike Mansfield (Democratic) 50.8%; ▌Zales Ecton (Republican) 48.6%
Nebraska	Hugh A. Butler	Republican	1940; 1946	Incumbent re-elected.	▌ ✓ Hugh A. Butler (Republican) 69.1%; ▌Stanley D. Long (Democratic) 27.8%
Nevada	George W. Malone	Republican	1946	Incumbent re-elected.	▌ ✓ George W. Malone (Republican) 51.7%; ▌Thomas B. Mechling (Democratic) 48.3%
New Jersey	H. Alexander Smith	Republican	1944 (special); 1946	Incumbent re-elected.	▌ ✓ H. Alexander Smith (Republican) 55.5%; ▌Archibald S. Alexander (Democratic) 43.6%
New Mexico	Dennis Chávez	Democratic	1935 (Appointed); 1936 (special); 1940; 1946	Incumbent re-elected.	▌ ✓ Dennis Chávez (Democratic) 51.1%; ▌Patrick J. Hurley (Republican) 48.9%
New York	Irving Ives	Republican	1946	Incumbent re-elected.	▌ ✓ Irving Ives (Republican) 55.2%; ▌John Cashmore (Democratic) 36.1%; ▌George Counts (Liberal) 7.0%
North Dakota	William Langer	Republican	1940; 1946	Incumbent re-elected.	▌ ✓ William Langer (Republican) 66.4%; ▌Harold A. Morrison (Democratic) 23.3%; ▌Fred G. Aandahl (Independent) 10.4%
Ohio	John W. Bricker	Republican	1946	Incumbent re-elected.	▌ ✓ John W. Bricker (Republican) 54.6%; ▌Michael DiSalle (Democratic) 45.4%
Pennsylvania	Edward Martin	Republican	1946	Incumbent re-elected.	▌ ✓ Edward Martin (Republican) 51.6%; ▌Guy K. Bard (Democratic) 48.0%
Rhode Island	John Pastore	Democratic	1950 (special)	Incumbent re-elected.	▌ ✓ John Pastore (Democratic) 54.8%; ▌Bayard Ewing (Republican) 45.2%
Tennessee	Kenneth McKellar	Democratic	1916; 1922; 1928; 1934; 1940; 1946	Incumbent lost renomination. New senator elected. Democratic hold.	▌ ✓ Albert Gore Sr. (Democratic) 74.2%; ▌Hobart F. Atkins (Republican) 20.9%
Texas	Tom Connally	Democratic	1928; 1934; 1940; 1946	Incumbent retired. New senator elected. Democratic hold.	▌ ✓ Price Daniel (Democratic); Unopposed
Utah	Arthur V. Watkins	Republican	1946	Incumbent re-elected.	▌ ✓ Arthur V. Watkins (Republican) 54.3%; ▌Walter K. Granger (Democratic) 45.7%
Vermont	Ralph Flanders	Republican	1946 (Appointed); 1946 (special); 1952	Incumbent re-elected.	▌ ✓ Ralph Flanders (Republican) 72.3%; ▌Allan R. Johnston (Democratic) 27.7%
Virginia	Harry F. Byrd	Democratic	1933 (Appointed); 1933 (special); 1934; 1940; 1946	Incumbent re-elected.	▌ ✓ Harry F. Byrd (Democratic) 73.4%; ▌H. M. Vise Sr. (Independent) 12.7%; ▌Clarke T. Robb (Independent) 12.4%
Washington	Harry P. Cain	Republican	1946; 1946 (Appointed)	Incumbent lost re-election. New senator elected. Democratic gain.	▌ ✓ Henry M. Jackson (Democratic) 56.2%; ▌Harry P. Cain (Republican) 43.5%
West Virginia	Harley M. Kilgore	Democratic	1940; 1946	Incumbent re-elected.	▌ ✓ Harley M. Kilgore (Democratic) 53.6%; ▌Chapman Revercomb (Republican) 46.4%
Wisconsin	Joseph McCarthy	Republican	1946	Incumbent re-elected.	▌ ✓ Joseph McCarthy (Republican) 54.2%; ▌Thomas E. Fairchild (Democratic) 45.6%
Wyoming	Joseph C. O'Mahoney	Democratic	1933 (Appointed); 1934; 1940; 1946	Incumbent lost re-election. New senator elected. Republican gain.	▌ ✓ Frank A. Barrett (Republican) 51.6%; ▌Joseph C. O'Mahoney (Democratic) 48.4%

== Closest races ==
Twenty races had a margin of victory under 10%:

State	Party of winner	Margin
Michigan	Republican (flip)	1.6%
Montana	Democratic (flip)	2.19%
New Mexico	Democratic	2.24%
Arizona	Republican (flip)	2.6% (Note: Arizona was the "tipping-point state".)
Connecticut (special)	Republican	2.7%
Massachusetts	Democratic (flip)	2.99%
Kentucky (special)	Republican (flip)	3.0%
Wyoming	Republican (flip)	3.2%
Nevada	Republican	3.4%
Pennsylvania	Republican	3.6%
Maryland	Republican (flip)	5.0%
Indiana	Republican	5.6%
West Virginia	Democratic	7.2%
Missouri	Democratic (flip)	8.05%
Connecticut	Republican (flip)	8.12%
Utah	Republican	8.52%
Wisconsin	Republican	8.67%
Delaware	Republican	9.0%
Ohio	Republican	9.2%
Rhode Island	Democratic	9.6%

== Arizona ==
1952 United States Senate election in Arizona
- November 4, 1952
- Turnout: 82.28% (registered voters)
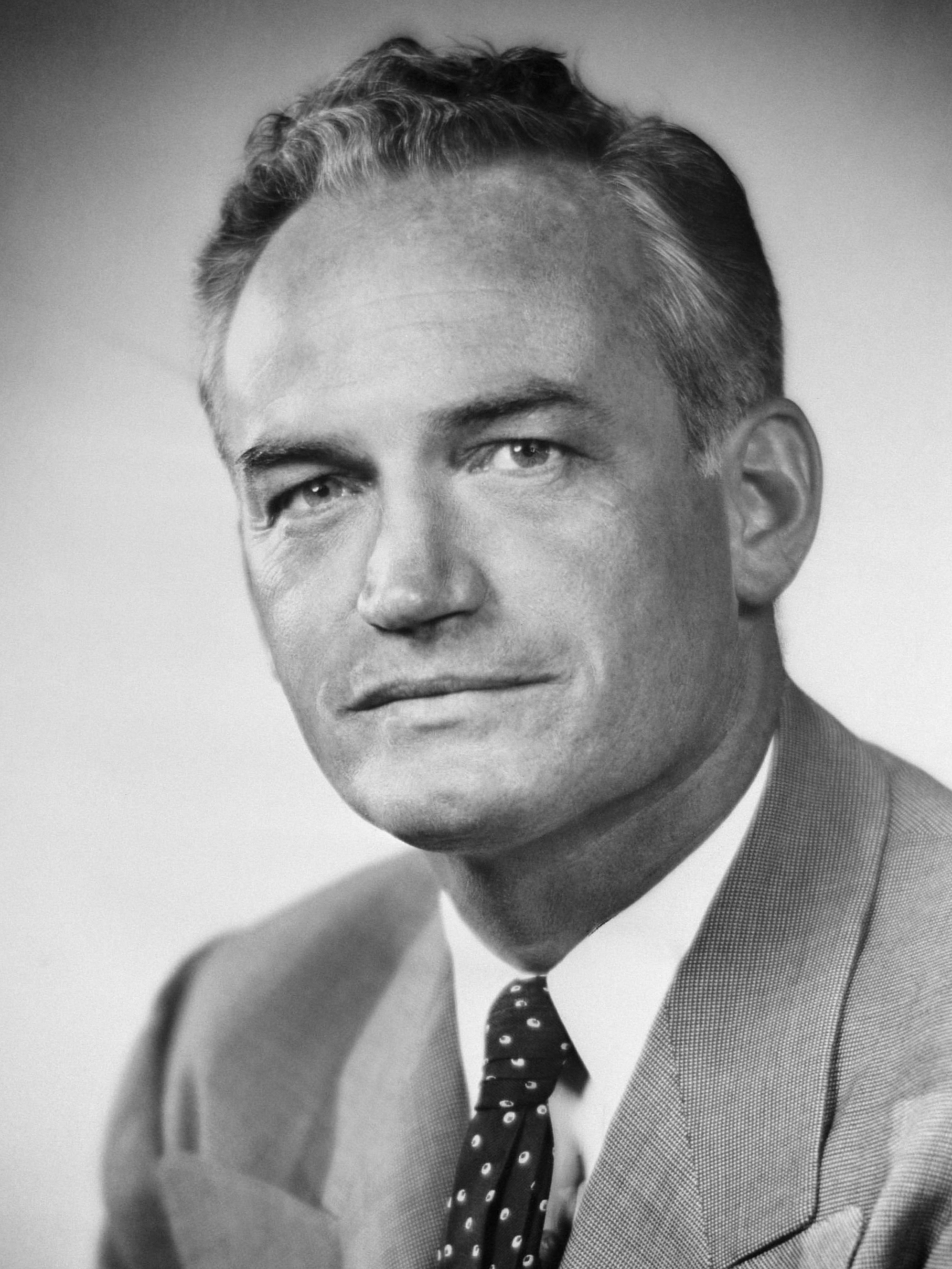

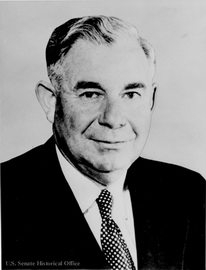
Nominee	Barry Goldwater	Ernest McFarland
Party	Republican	Democratic
Popular vote	132,063	125,338
Percentage	51.31%	48.69%
- County results Goldwater: 50–60% McFarland: 50–60% 60–70% 70–80%
U.S. senator before election
Ernest McFarland
Democratic
Elected U.S. Senator
Barry Goldwater
Republican

1952 United States Senate election in Arizona
Party	Candidate	Votes	%
Republican	Barry Goldwater	132,063	51.31
Democratic	Ernest McFarland (incumbent)	125,338	48.69
Majority		6,725	2.62
Turnout		257,401	82.28
Republican gain from Democratic			

== California ==
1952 United States Senate election in California
- November 4, 1952
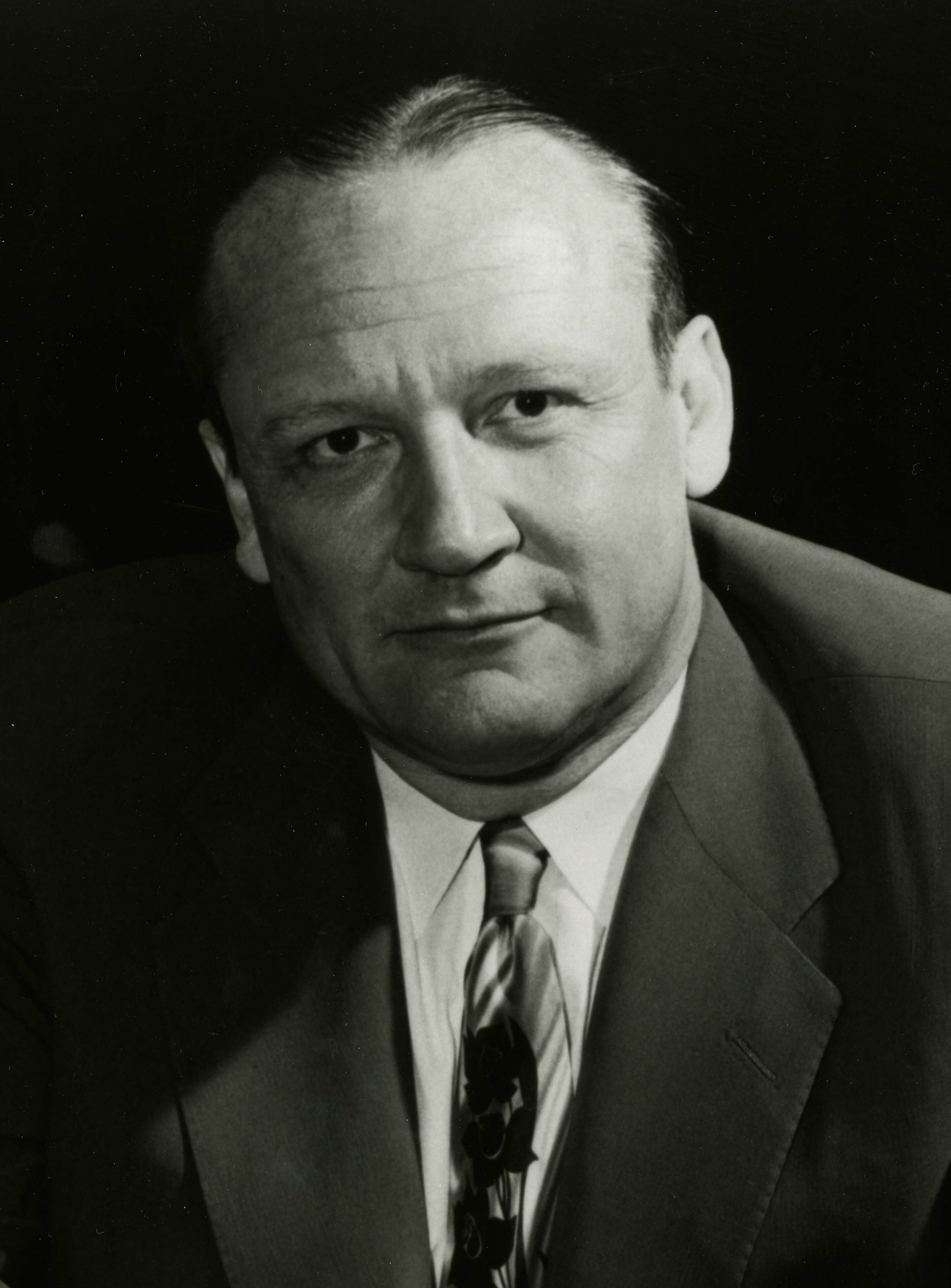

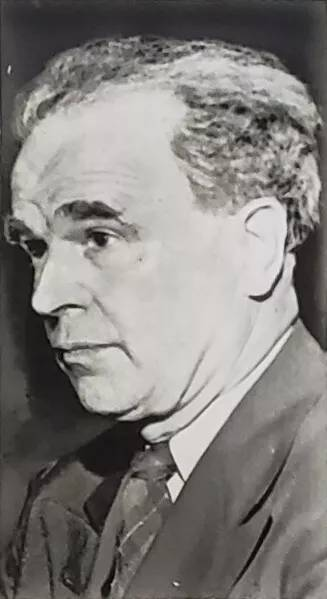
Nominee	William F. Knowland	Reuben W. Borough
Party	Republican	Progressive
Alliance	Democratic
Popular vote	3,982,448	542,270
Percentage	87.79%	11.95%
- County results Knowland: 80–90% 90–100%
U.S. senator before election
William F. Knowland
Republican
Elected U.S. Senator
William F. Knowland
Republican

1952 United States Senate election in California
Party	Candidate	Votes	%	±%
Republican	William Knowland (incumbent)	3,982,448	87.79	+33.69%
Progressive	Reuben W. Borough	542,270	11.95	N/A
Write-in	Helen Gahagan Douglas	11,812	0.26	N/A
Total votes		4,536,530	100.00	
Republican hold		Swing		

== Connecticut ==
There were two elections on the same day, due to the July 28, 1952 death of two-term Democrat Brien McMahon.

Republican businessman William Purtell was appointed on August 29, 1952, to continue the class 3 term, pending a special election in which he was not a candidate. Purtell was already the Republican nominee in the regular election for the class 1 seat, a race he then won.

=== Connecticut (special) ===
1952 United States Senate special election in Connecticut
- November 4, 1952
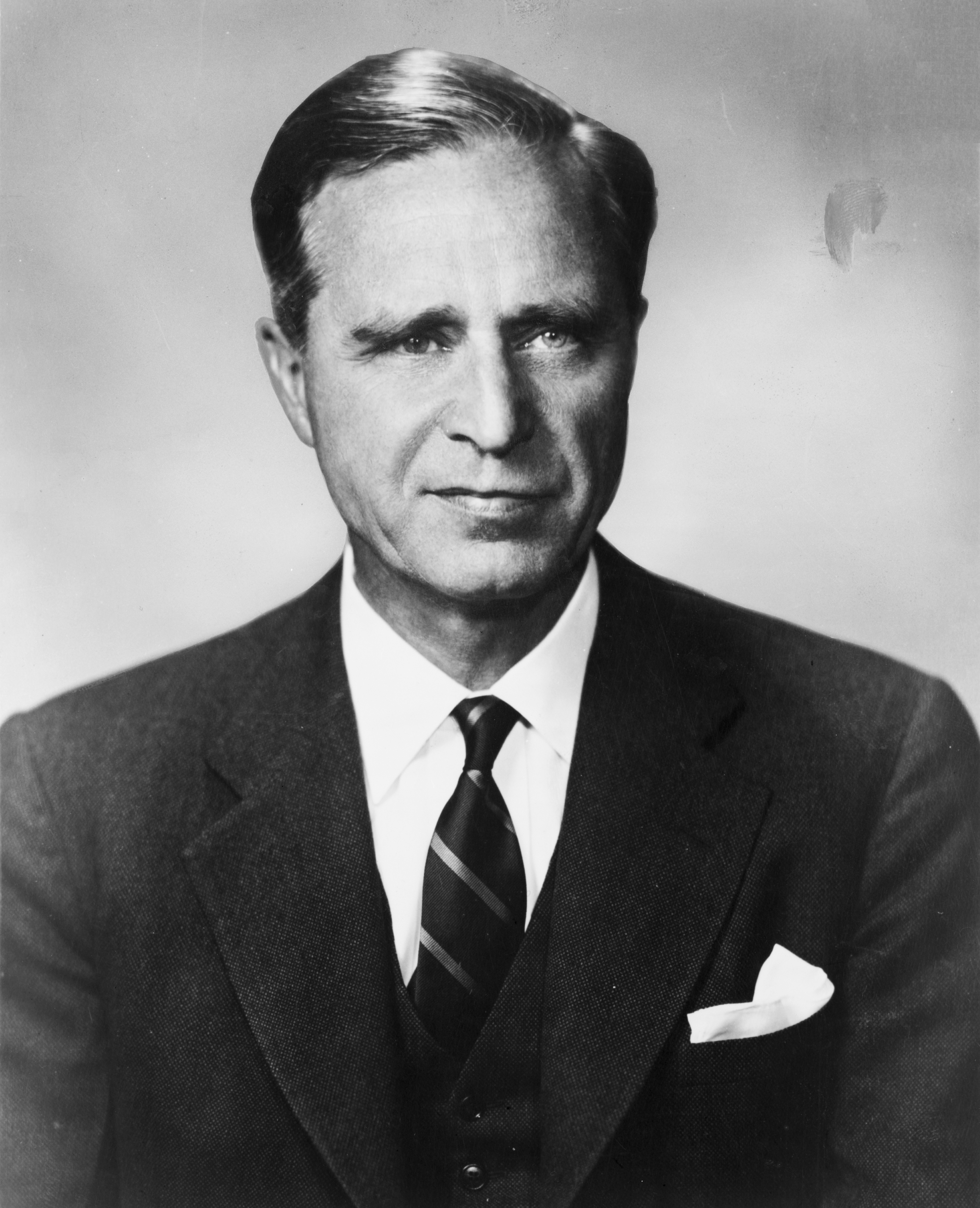

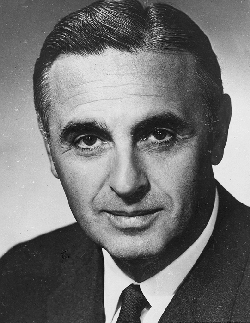
Nominee	Prescott Bush	Abraham Ribicoff
Party	Republican	Democratic
Popular vote	559,465	530,505
Percentage	51.17%	48.52%
- Bush: 50–60% 60–70% 70–80% 80–90% Ribicoff: 50–60% 60–70%
U.S. senator before election
William A. Purtell
Republican
Elected U.S. Senator
Prescott Bush
Republican

Connecticut special election
Party	Candidate	Votes	%
Republican	Prescott Bush	559,465	51.17
Democratic	Abraham A. Ribicoff	530,505	48.52
Socialist	William J. Taft	3,298	0.30
Majority		28,960	2.65
Turnout		1,093,268	54.47
Republican hold			

=== Connecticut (regular) ===
1952 United States Senate election in Connecticut
- November 4, 1952
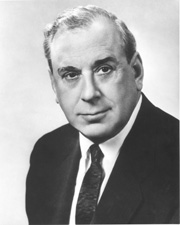

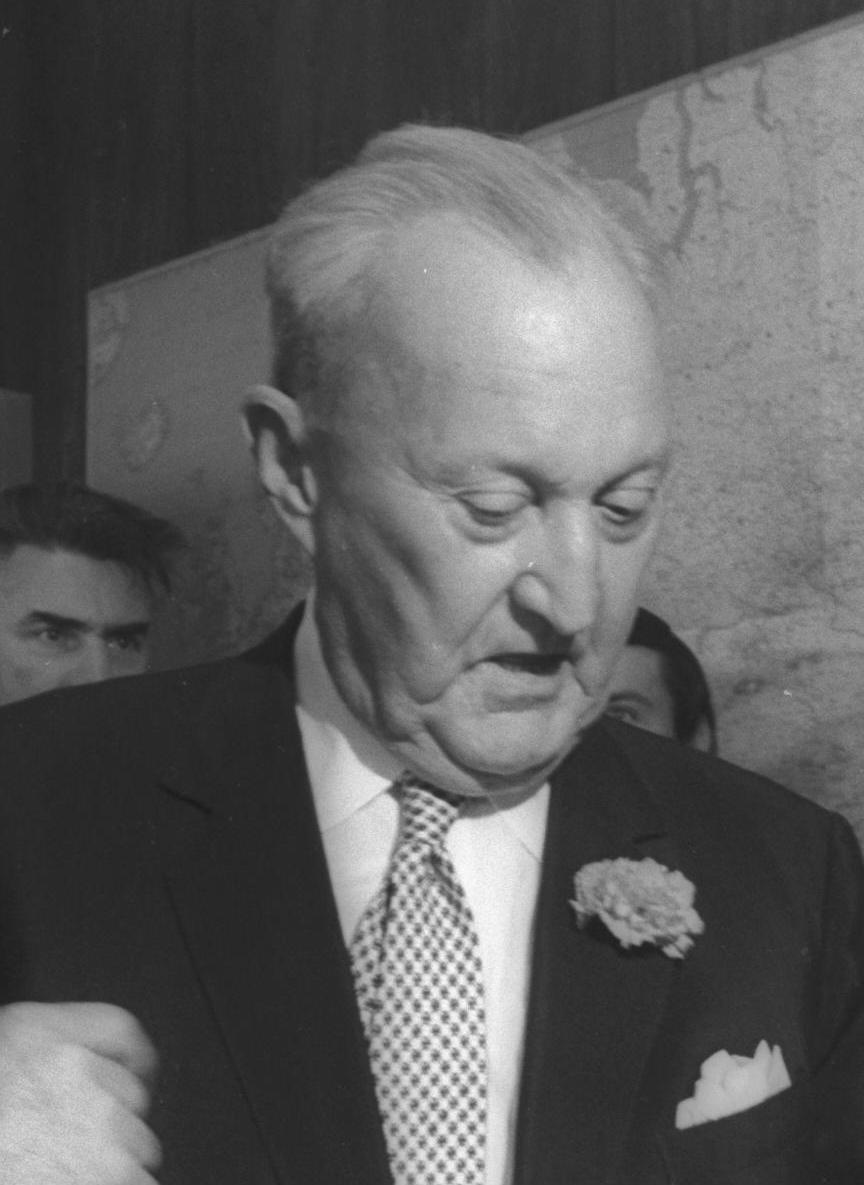
Nominee	William A. Purtell	William Benton
Party	Republican	Democratic
Popular vote	573,854	485,066
Percentage	52.48%	44.36%
- Purtell: 40–50% 50–60% 60–70% 70–80% 80–90% Benton: 40–50% 50–60% 60–70%
U.S. senator before election
William Benton
Democratic
Elected U.S. Senator
William A. Purtell
Republican

Connecticut general election
Party	Candidate	Votes	%
Republican	William A. Purtell	573,854	52.48
Democratic	William Benton (incumbent)	485,066	44.36
Independent Republican	Vivien Kellems	22,268	2.04
Socialist	Jasper McLevy	12,279	1.12
Majority		88,788	8.12
Turnout		1,093,467	
Republican gain from Democratic			

== Delaware ==
1952 United States Senate election in Delaware
- November 4, 1952
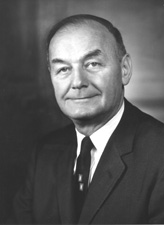

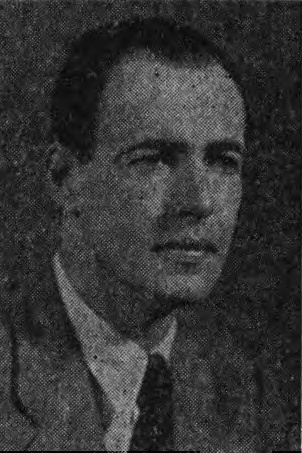
Nominee	John J. Williams	Alexis I. du Pont Bayard
Party	Republican	Democratic
Popular vote	93,020	77,685
Percentage	54.49%	45.51%
- County results Williams: 50–60%
U.S. senator before election
John J. Williams
Republican
Elected U.S. Senator
John J. Williams
Republican

1952 United States Senate election in Delaware
Party	Candidate	Votes	%
Republican	John J. Williams (incumbent)	93,020	54.49
Democratic	Alexis I. du Pont Bayard	77,685	45.51
Majority		15,335	8.98
Turnout		170,705	
Republican hold			

== Florida ==
1952 United States Senate election in Florida
- November 4, 1952
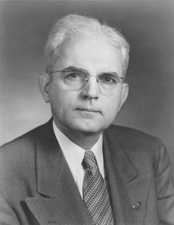
Nominee	Spessard Holland
Party	Democratic
Popular vote	616,665
Percentage	99.82%
- County results Holland: >90%
U.S. senator before election
Spessard Holland
Democratic
Elected U.S. Senator
Spessard Holland
Democratic

General election results
Party	Candidate	Votes	%	±%
Democratic	Spessard Holland (incumbent)	616,665	99.82%	
	Write-ins	1,135	0.18%	
Total votes		617,800	100.00%	

== Indiana ==
1952 United States Senate election in Indiana
- November 4, 1952
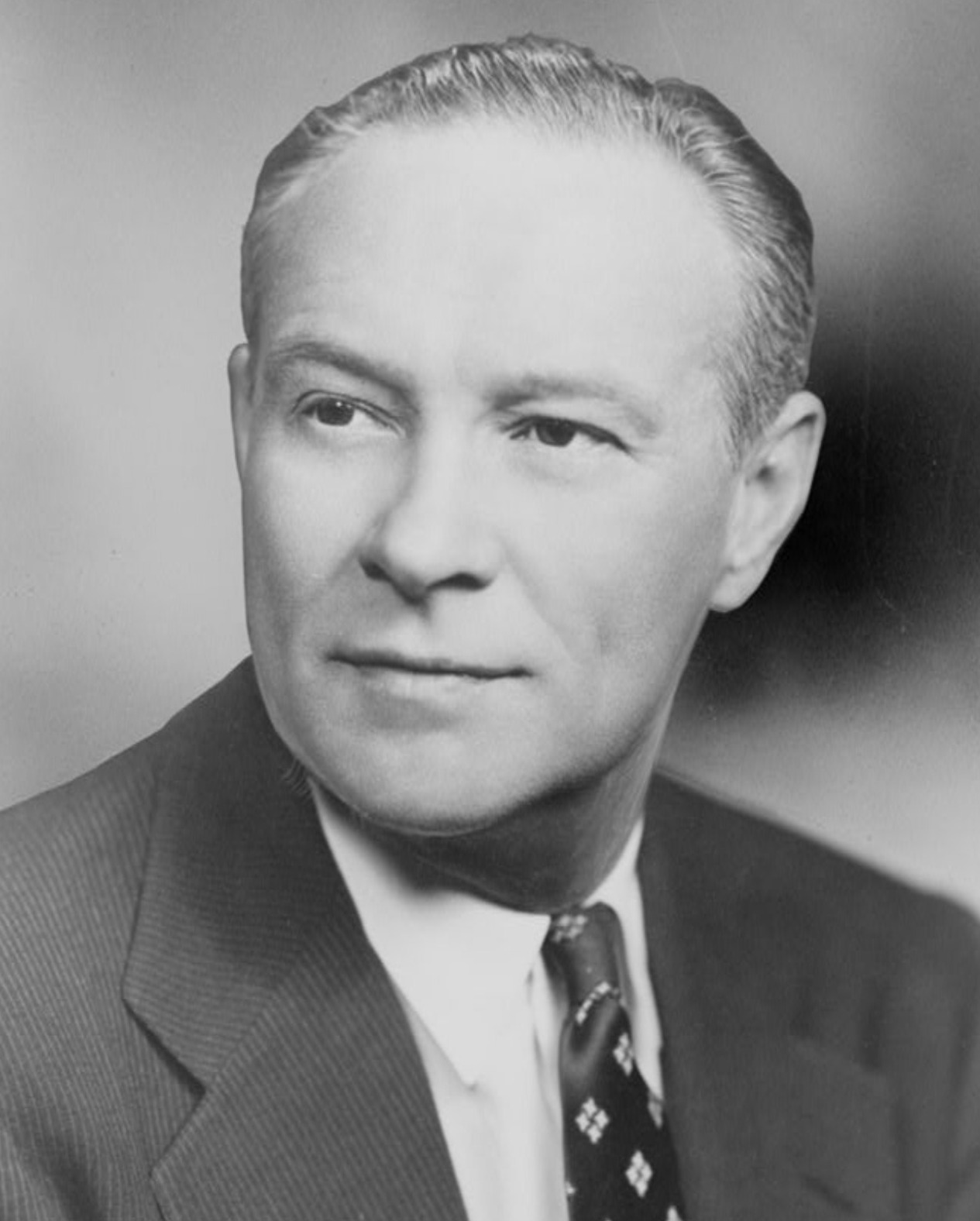

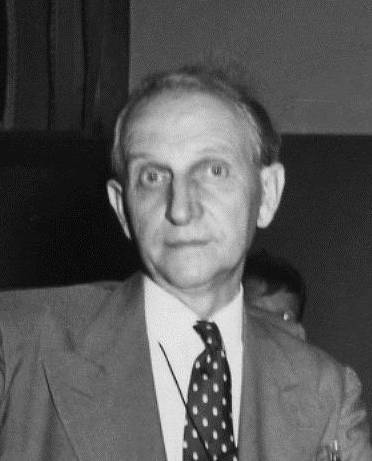
Nominee	William E. Jenner	Henry F. Schricker
Party	Republican	Democratic
Popular vote	1,020,605	911,169
Percentage	52.44%	46.82%
- County results Jenner: 40–50% 50–60% 60–70% 70–80% Schricker: 40–50% 50–60%
U.S. senator before election
William E. Jenner
Republican
Elected U.S. Senator
William E. Jenner
Republican

1952 United States Senate election in Indiana
Party	Candidate	Votes	%
Republican	William E. Jenner (incumbent)	1,020,605	52.44
Democratic	Henry F. Schricker	911,169	46.82
Prohibition	Carl W. Thompson	12,734	0.65
Progressive	Carl Leon Eddy	891	0.05
Socialist Labor	John Marion Morris	719	0.04
Majority		109,436	5.62
Turnout		1,946,118	
Republican hold			

== Kentucky (special) ==
Kentucky special election
- November 4, 1952
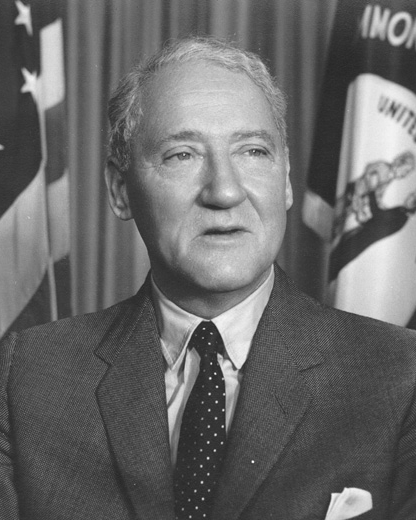

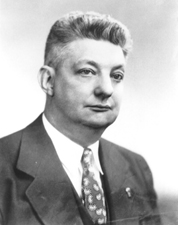
Nominee	John Sherman Cooper	Thomas R. Underwood
Party	Republican	Democratic
Popular vote	494,576	465,652
Percentage	51.5%	48.5%
- County results Cooper: 50–60% 60–70% 70–80% 80–90% Underwood: 50–60% 60–70% 70–80% 80–90%
U.S. senator before election
Thomas R. Underwood
Democratic
Elected U.S. Senator
John Sherman Cooper
Republican

1952 United States Senate special election in Kentucky
Party	Candidate	Votes	%
Republican	John Sherman Cooper	494,576	51.51
Democratic	Thomas R. Underwood (incumbent)	465,652	48.49
Majority		28,924	3.02
Turnout		960,228	
Republican gain from Democratic			

== Maine ==
Maine election
- September 8, 1952
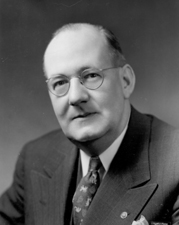

Nominee	Frederick G. Payne	Roger P. Dube
Party	Republican	Democratic
Popular vote	139,205	82,665
Percentage	58.70%	34.86%
Nominee	Earl S. Grant
Party	Independent Democratic
Popular vote	15,294
Percentage	6.45%
- County results Payne: 40–50% 50–60% 60–70% 70–80% Dube: 40–50%
U.S. senator before election
Owen Brewster
Republican
Elected U.S. Senator
Frederick G. Payne
Republican

1952 United States Senate election in Maine
Party	Candidate	Votes	%
Republican	Frederick G. Payne	139,205	58.70
Democratic	Roger P. Dube	82,665	34.86
Independent Democratic	Earl S. Grant	15,294	6.45
Majority		56,540	23.84
Turnout		237,164	
Republican hold			

== Maryland ==
1952 United States Senate election in Maryland
- November 4, 1952
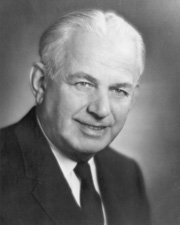

Nominee	James Glenn Beall	George P. Mahoney
Party	Republican	Democratic
Popular vote	449,823	406,370
Percentage	52.54%	47.46%
- County results Beall: 50–60% 60–70% Mahoney: 50–60%
U.S. senator before election
Herbert O'Conor
Democratic
Elected U.S. Senator
James Glenn Beall
Republican

1952 United States Senate election in Maryland
Party	Candidate	Votes	%
Republican	J. Glenn Beall	449,823	52.54
Democratic	George P. Mahoney	406,370	47.46
Majority		43,453	5.08
Turnout		856,193	
Republican gain from Democratic			

== Massachusetts ==
1952 United States Senate election in Massachusetts
- November 4, 1952
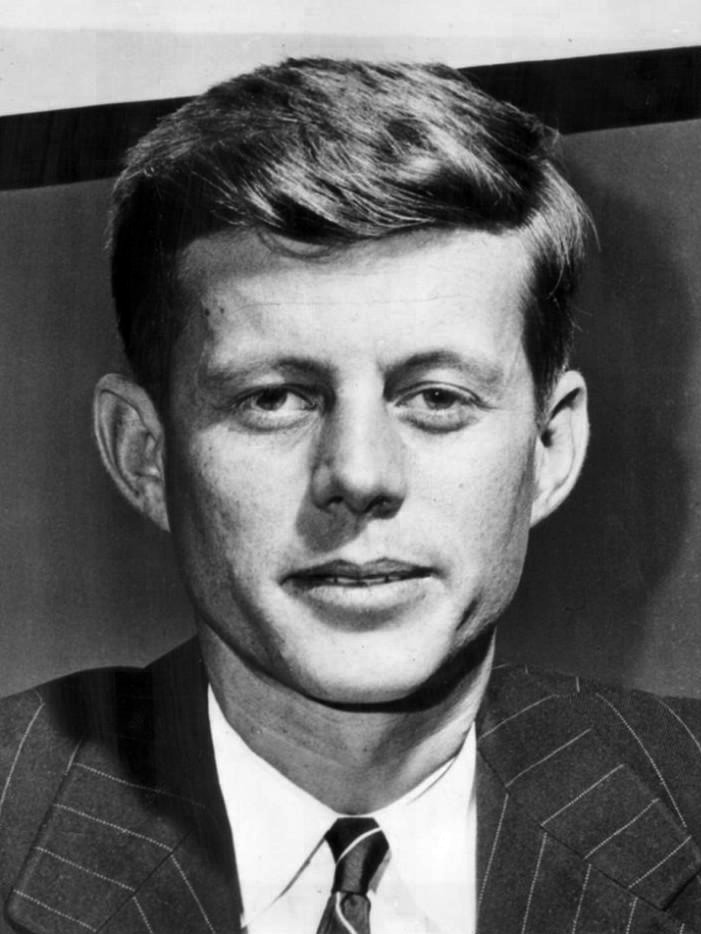

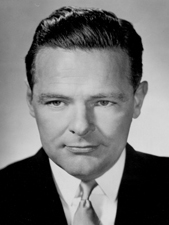
Nominee	John F. Kennedy	Henry Cabot Lodge Jr.
Party	Democratic	Republican
Popular vote	1,211,984	1,141,247
Percentage	51.34%	48.35%

Kennedy
50–60%
60–70%
70–80%
Lodge
50–60%
60–70%
70–80%
80–90%
90–100%
U.S. senator before election
Henry Cabot Lodge Jr.
Republican
Elected U.S. Senator
John F. Kennedy
Democratic

General election
Party	Candidate	Votes	%
Democratic	John F. Kennedy	1,211,984	51.34
Republican	Henry Cabot Lodge Jr. (incumbent)	1,141,247	48.35
Socialist Labor	Thelma Ingersoll	4,683	0.20
Prohibition	Mark R. Shaw	2,508	0.11
None	Scattering	3	0.00
Majority		70,737	3.0
Turnout		2,360,425	
Democratic gain from Republican			

== Michigan ==
There were two elections to the same seat on the same day, due to the April 18, 1951 death of five-term Republican Arthur Vandenberg. Democratic journalist Blair Moody was appointed on April 23, 1951 to continue the term, pending a special election. The primary elections were held on August 5, 1952. Moody lost both the special and the regular elections to Republican Congressman Charles E. Potter.

=== Michigan (special) ===
1952 United States Senate special election in Michigan
- November 4, 1952
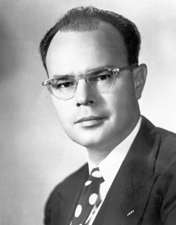

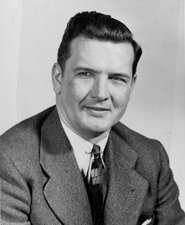
Nominee	Charles E. Potter	Blair Moody
Party	Republican	Democratic
Popular vote	1,417,032	1,347,705
Percentage	51.24%	48.73%
- County results Potter: 50–60% 60–70% 70–80% 80–90% Moody: 50–60% 60–70%
U.S. senator before election
Blair Moody
Democratic
Elected U.S. Senator
Charles E. Potter
Republican

Michigan special election
Party	Candidate	Votes	%
Republican	Charles E. Potter	1,417,032	51.24
Democratic	Blair Moody (incumbent)	1,347,705	48.73
Socialist Workers	Genora Dollinger	819	0.03
None	Scattering	160	0.01
Majority		69,327	2.51
Turnout		2,765,716	43.40
Republican gain from Democratic			

=== Michigan (regular) ===
1952 United States Senate election in Michigan
- November 4, 1952
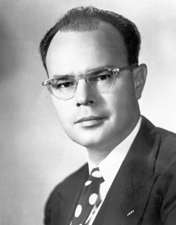

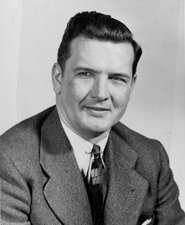
Nominee	Charles E. Potter	Blair Moody
Party	Republican	Democratic
Popular vote	1,428,352	1,383,416
Percentage	50.63%	49.04%
- County results Potter: 50–60% 60–70% 70–80% 80–90% Moody: 50–60% 60–70%
U.S. senator before election
Blair Moody
Democratic
Elected U.S. Senator
Charles E. Potter
Republican

Michigan general election
Party	Candidate	Votes	%
Republican	Charles E. Potter	1,428,352	50.63
Democratic	Blair Moody (incumbent)	1,383,416	49.04
Prohibition	LeRoy M. Lowell	7,435	0.26
Socialist Labor	James Sim	1,202	0.04
Socialist Workers	Genora Dollinger	726	0.03
None	Scattering	2	0.00
Majority		44,936	1.59
Turnout		2,821,131	44.28
Republican gain from Democratic			

== Minnesota ==
1952 United States Senate election in Minnesota
- November 4, 1952
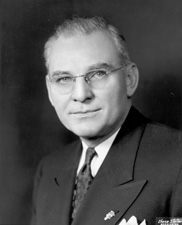

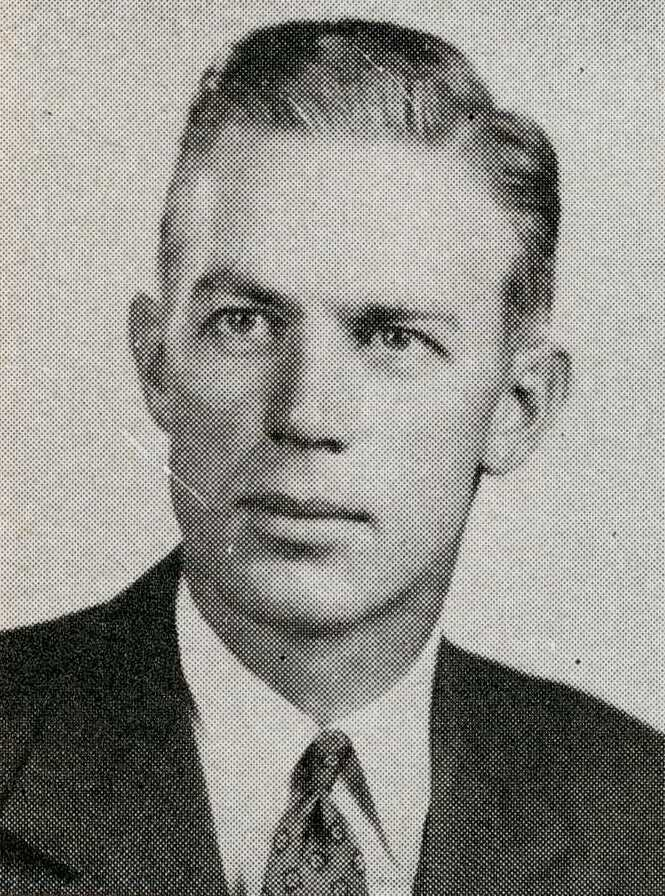
Nominee	Edward J. Thye	Bill Carlson
Party	Republican	Democratic (DFL)
Popular vote	785,649	590,011
Percentage	56.63%	42.53%
- County results Thye: 40–50% 50–60% 60–70% 70–80% 80–90% Carlson: 50–60% 60–70%
U.S. senator before election
Edward J. Thye
Republican
Elected U.S. Senator
Edward J. Thye
Republican

Minnesota election
Party	Candidate	Votes	%
Republican	Edward J. Thye (incumbent)	785,649	56.63
Democratic (DFL)	Bill Carlson	590,011	42.53
Progressive	Marian LeSueur	7,917	0.57
Socialist Workers	Vincent R. Dunne	3,842	0.28
Majority		195,638	14.10
Turnout		1,387,419	
Republican hold			

== Mississippi ==
1952 U.S. Senate Democratic primary in Mississippi
- August 26, 1952
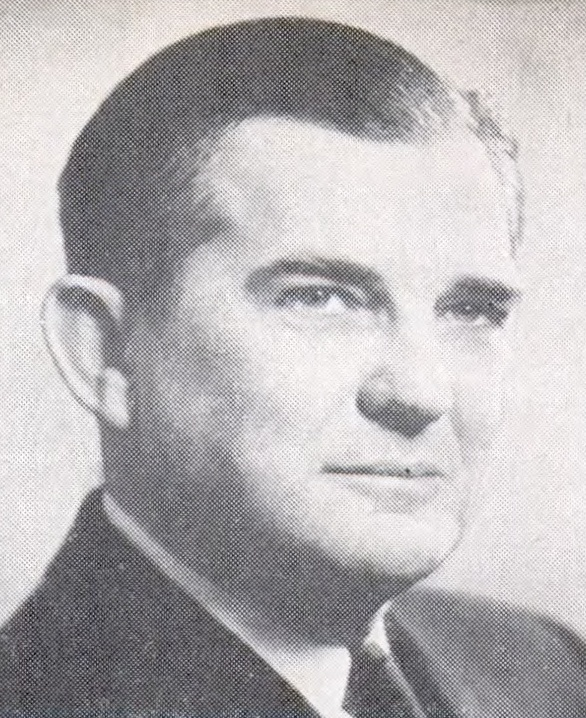

Nominee	John C. Stennis	William P. Davis
Party	Democratic	Democratic
Popular vote	191,380	22,802
Percentage	89.35%	10.65%
- County results Stennis: 70–80% 80–90% >90%
U.S. senator before election
John C. Stennis
Democratic
Elected U.S. Senator
John C. Stennis
Democratic

1952 United States Senate election in Mississippi
Party	Candidate	Votes	%
Democratic	John C. Stennis (incumbent)	233,919	100.00
Democratic hold			

== Missouri ==
1952 United States Senate election in Missouri
- November 4, 1952
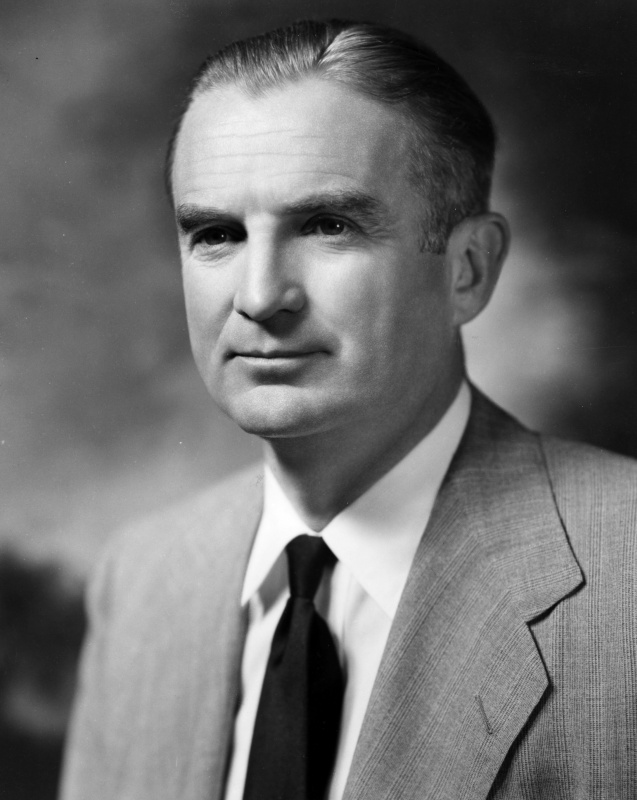

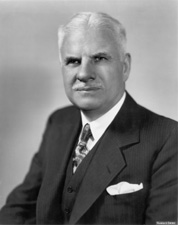
Nominee	Stuart Symington	James P. Kem
Party	Democratic	Republican
Popular vote	1,008,521	858,170
Percentage	53.99%	45.94%
- County results Symington: 50–60% 60–70% 70–80% Kem: 50–60% 60–70% 70–80% 80–90%
U.S. senator before election
James P. Kem
Republican
Elected U.S. Senator
Stuart Symington
Democratic

1952 United States Senate election in Missouri
Party	Candidate	Votes	%
Democratic	Stuart Symington	1,008,521	53.99
Republican	James P. Kem (incumbent)	858,170	45.94
Progressive	Haven P. Perkins	883	0.05
Socialist	Joseph G. Hodges	219	0.01
Christian Nationalist	Christian Frederick	161	0.01
Socialist Labor	Henry W. Genck	145	0.01
Majority		150,351	8.05
Turnout		1,868,099	
Democratic gain from Republican			

== Montana ==
1952 United States Senate election in Montana
- November 4, 1952
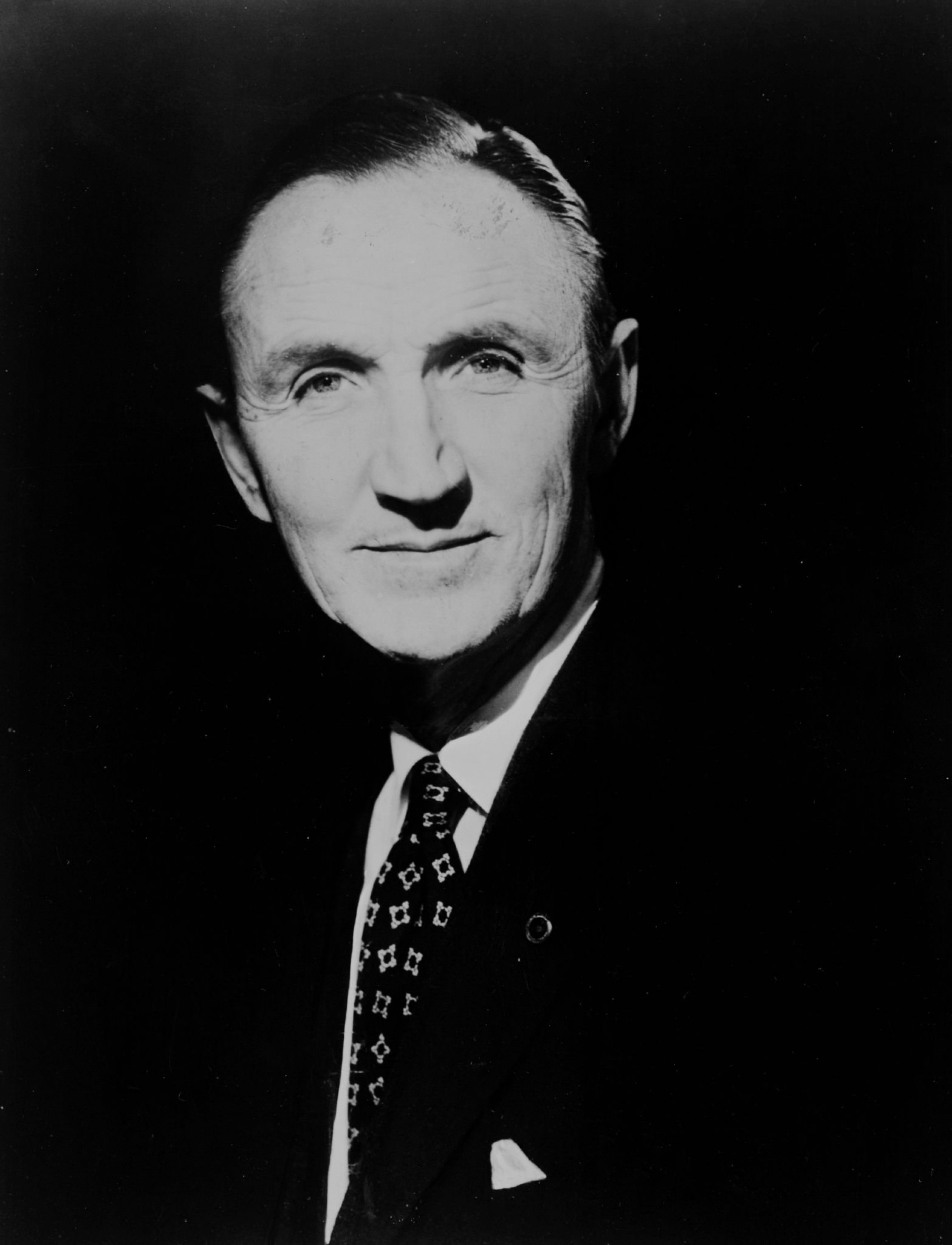

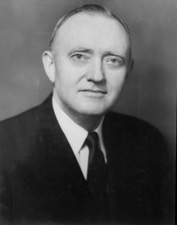
Nominee	Mike Mansfield	Zales Ecton
Party	Democratic	Republican
Popular vote	133,109	127,360
Percentage	50.75%	48.56%
- County results Mansfield: 40–50% 50–60% 60–70% 70–80% Ecton: 50–60% 60–70% 70–80%
U.S. senator before election
Zales Ecton
Republican
Elected U.S. Senator
Mike Mansfield
Democratic

1952 United States Senate election in Montana
Party	Candidate	Votes	%
Democratic	Mike Mansfield	133,109	50.75
Republican	Zales N. Ecton (incumbent)	127,360	48.56
Progressive	Lawrence J. "Larry" Price	1,828	0.70
Majority		5,749	2.19
Turnout		262,297	
Democratic gain from Republican			

== Nebraska ==
=== Nebraska (special) ===
1952 United States Senate special election in Nebraska
- November 4, 1952
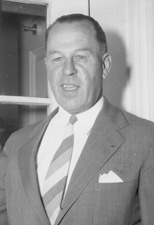

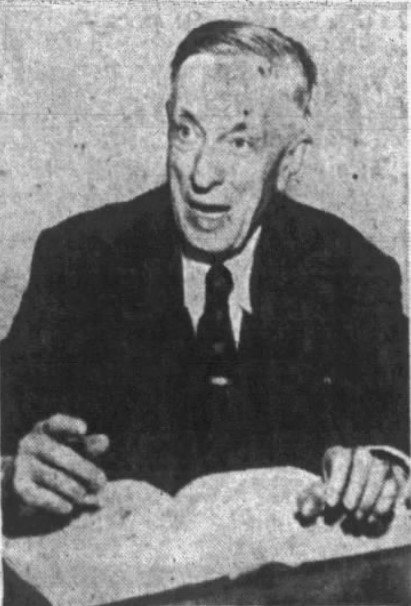
Nominee	Dwight Griswold	William Ritchie
Party	Republican	Democratic
Popular vote	369,841	211,898
Percentage	63.57%	36.42%
- County results Griswold: 50–60% 60–70% 70–80% 80–90%
U.S. senator before election
Fred A. Seaton
Republican
Elected U.S. Senator
Dwight Griswold
Republican

1952 United States Senate special election in Nebraska
Party	Candidate	Votes	%
Republican	Dwight Griswold	369,841	63.57
Democratic	William Ritchie	211,898	36.42
None	Scattering	11	<0.01
Majority		157,943	27.15
Turnout		581,750	
Republican hold			

=== Nebraska (regular) ===
1952 United States Senate election in Nebraska
- November 4, 1952
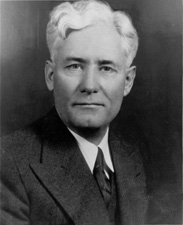

Nominee	Hugh A. Butler	Stanley D. Long
Party	Republican	Democratic
Popular vote	408,971	164,660
Percentage	69.11%	27.83%
- County results Butler: 50–60% 60–70% 70–80% 80–90%
U.S. senator before election
Hugh A. Butler
Republican
Elected U.S. Senator
Hugh A. Butler
Republican

1952 United States Senate election in Nebraska
Party	Candidate	Votes	%
Republican	Hugh Butler (incumbent)	408,971	69.11
Democratic	Stanley D. Long	164,660	27.83
By Petition	Dwight Dell	18,087	3.06
None	Scattering	31	0.01
Majority		244,311	41.28
Turnout		591,749	
Republican hold			

== Nevada ==
1952 United States Senate election in Nevada
- November 4, 1952
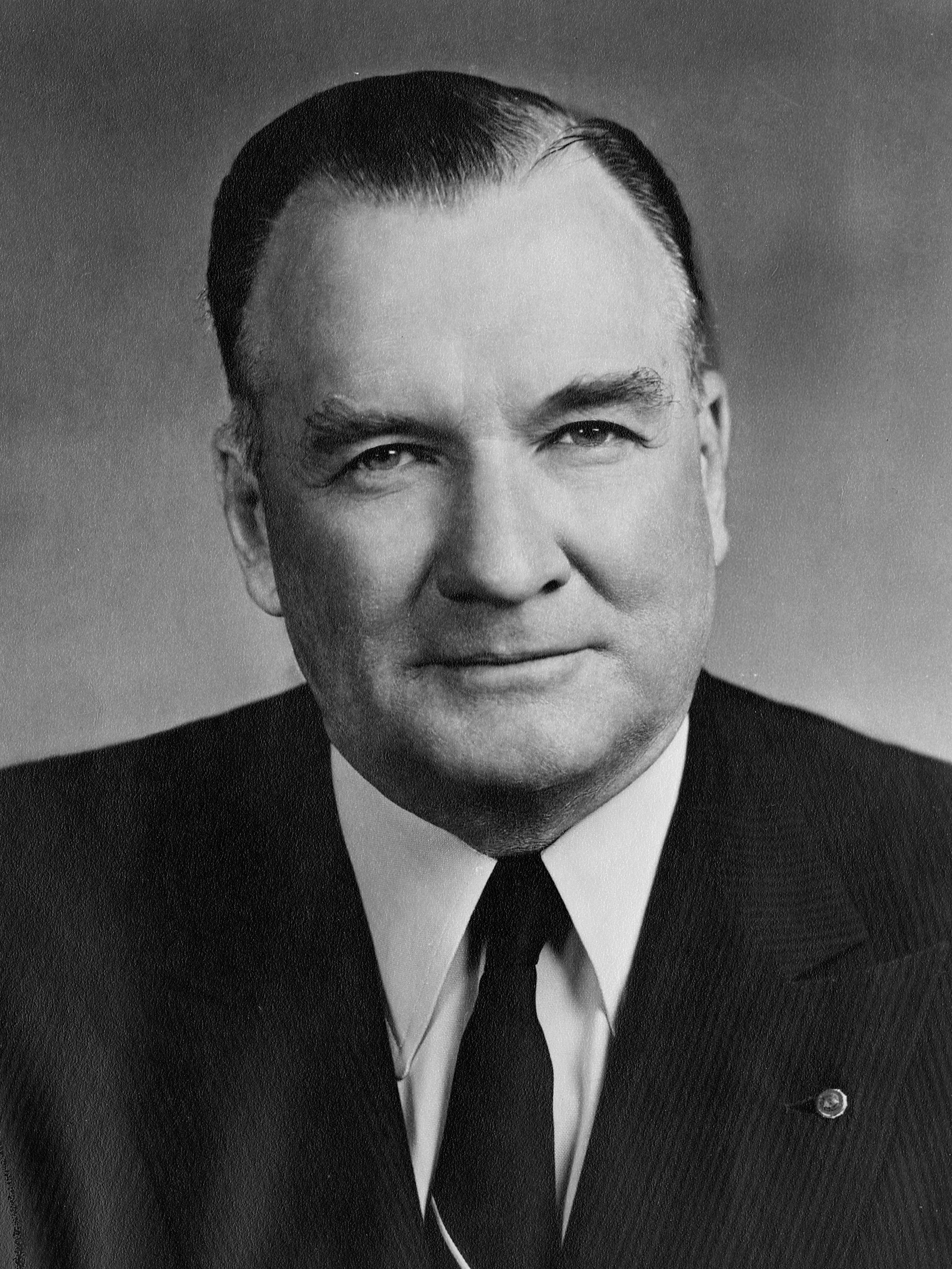

Nominee	George W. Malone	Thomas B. Mechling
Party	Republican	Democratic
Popular vote	41,906	39,184
Percentage	51.68%	48.32%
- County results Malone: 50–60% 60–70% 70–80% Mechling: 50–60% 60–70%
U.S. senator before election
George W. Malone
Republican
Elected U.S. Senator
George W. Malone
Republican

1952 United States Senate election in Nevada
Party	Candidate	Votes	%
Republican	George W. Malone (incumbent)	41,906	51.68
Democratic	Thomas B. Mechling	39,184	48.32
Majority		2,722	3.36
Turnout		81,090	
Republican hold			

== New Jersey ==
New Jersey election
- November 4, 1952
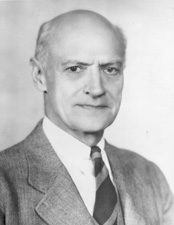

Nominee	Howard Smith	Archibald S. Alexander
Party	Republican	Democratic
Popular vote	1,286,782	1,011,187
Percentage	55.51%	43.62%
- County results Smith: 50–60% 60–70% 70–80% Alexander: 50–60%
Senator before election
Howard Smith
Republican
Elected Senator
Howard Smith
Republican

1952 United States Senate election in New Jersey
Party	Candidate	Votes	%
Republican	Howard Smith (incumbent)	1,286,782	55.51
Democratic	Archibald S. Alexander	1,011,187	43.62
Progressive	Katharine A. Van Orden	7,195	0.31
Prohibition	A. N. Smith	6,815	0.29
Socialist Workers	George Breitman	5,088	0.22
Socialist Labor	Albert Ronis	1,165	0.05
Majority		275,595	11.89
Turnout		2,318,232	
Republican hold			

As of 2020, this was the last time that Republicans won the Class 1 U.S. Senate seat from New Jersey.

== New Mexico ==
1952 United States Senate election in New Mexico
- November 4, 1952
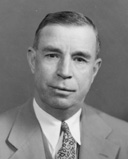

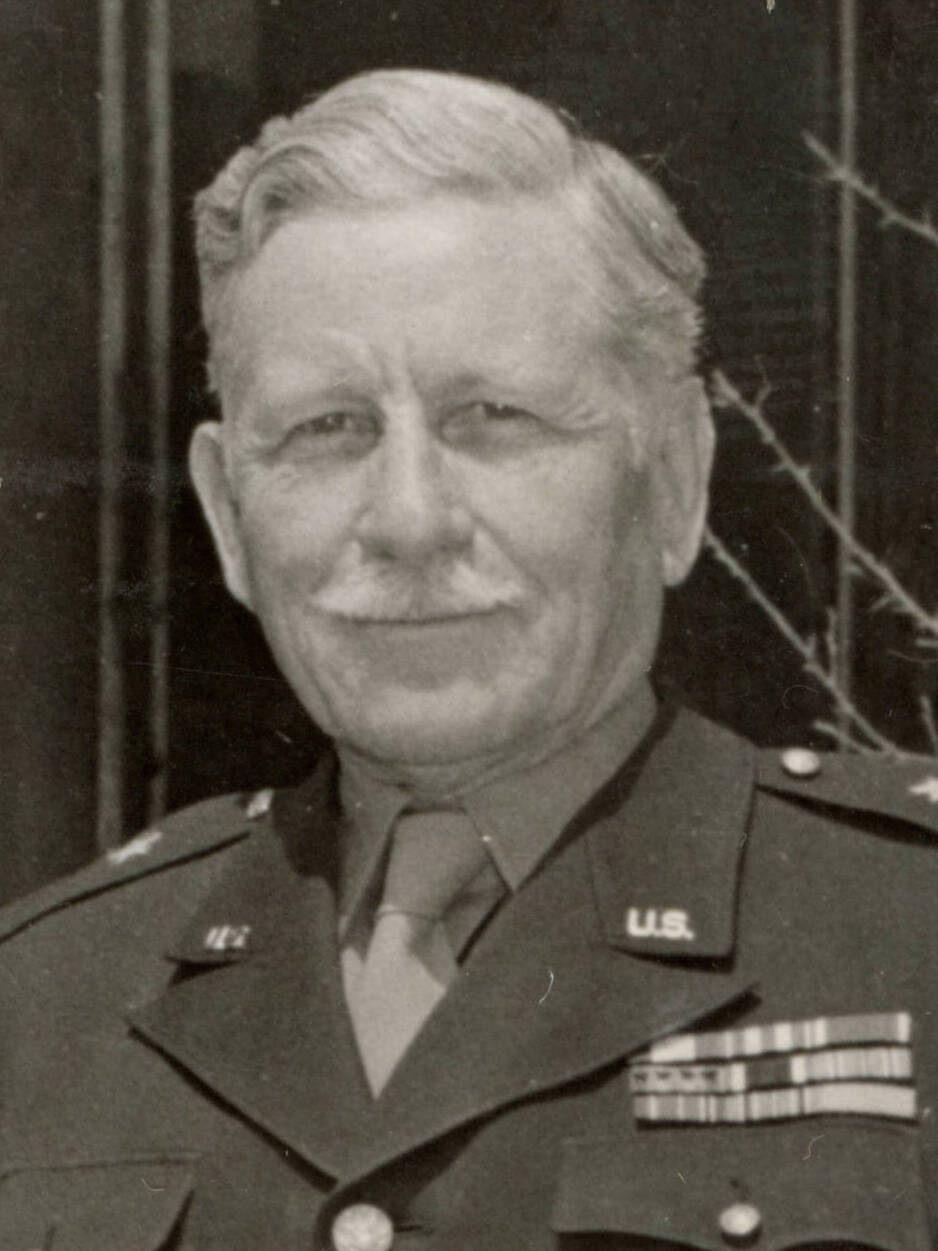
Nominee	Dennis Chavez	Patrick J. Hurley
Party	Democratic	Republican
Popular vote	122,543	117,168
Percentage	51.12%	48.88%
- County results Chevez: 50–60% 60–70% Hurley: 50–60% 60–70%
U.S. senator before election
Dennis Chavez
Democratic
Elected U.S. Senator
Dennis Chavez
Democratic

1952 United States Senate election in New Mexico
Party	Candidate	Votes	%
Democratic	Dennis Chavez (incumbent)	122,543	51.12
Republican	Patrick J. Hurley	117,168	48.88
Majority		5,375	2.24
Turnout		239,711	
Democratic hold			

== New York ==
1952 United States Senate election in New York
- November 4, 1952
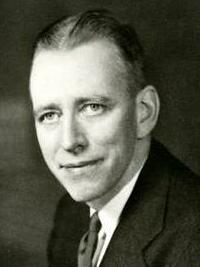

Nominee	Irving Ives	John Cashmore	George S. Counts
Party	Republican	Democratic	Liberal
Popular vote	3,853,934	2,521,736	489,775
Percentage	55.21%	36.13%	7.02%
- County results Ives: 40–50% 50–60% 60–70% 70–80% 80–90% Cashmore: 40–50%
U.S. senator before election
Irving M. Ives
Republican
Elected U.S. Senator
Irving M. Ives
Republican

In New York, the Liberal State Committee met on August 28, and nominated Dr. George S. Counts, professor of Education at Teachers College, Columbia University, for the U.S. Senate. The Republican State Committee re-nominated the incumbent U.S. Senator Irving M. Ives. The Democratic State Committee met on August 28, and nominated Brooklyn Borough President John Cashmore for the U.S. Senate.

The Republican incumbent Ives was re-elected with the then largest plurality (Note: In the New York election, "largest plurality" in this case means: difference between first and second placed candidate, considering the absolute number of votes.) in state history.

New York election
Party	Candidate	Votes	%
Republican	Irving M. Ives (incumbent)	3,853,934	55.21
Democratic	John Cashmore	2,521,736	36.13
Liberal	George S. Counts	489,775	7.02
American Labor	Corliss Lamont	104,702	1.50
Socialist Workers	Michael Bartell (Note: Michael Bartell also ran for governor of New York in 1950.)	4,263	0.06
Socialist	Joseph S. Glass (Note: Joseph G. Glass also ran for New York attorney general in 1942.)	3,382	0.05
Industrial Government	Nathan Karp (Note: Nathan Karp (b. ca. 1915), clothing cutter of Queens, also ran for lieutenant governor in 1950, mayor of New York in 1953, and governor of New York in 1954.)	2,451	0.04
Majority		1,332,198	19.08
Turnout		6,980,259	
Republican hold			

== North Dakota ==
1952 United States Senate election in North Dakota
- November 4, 1952
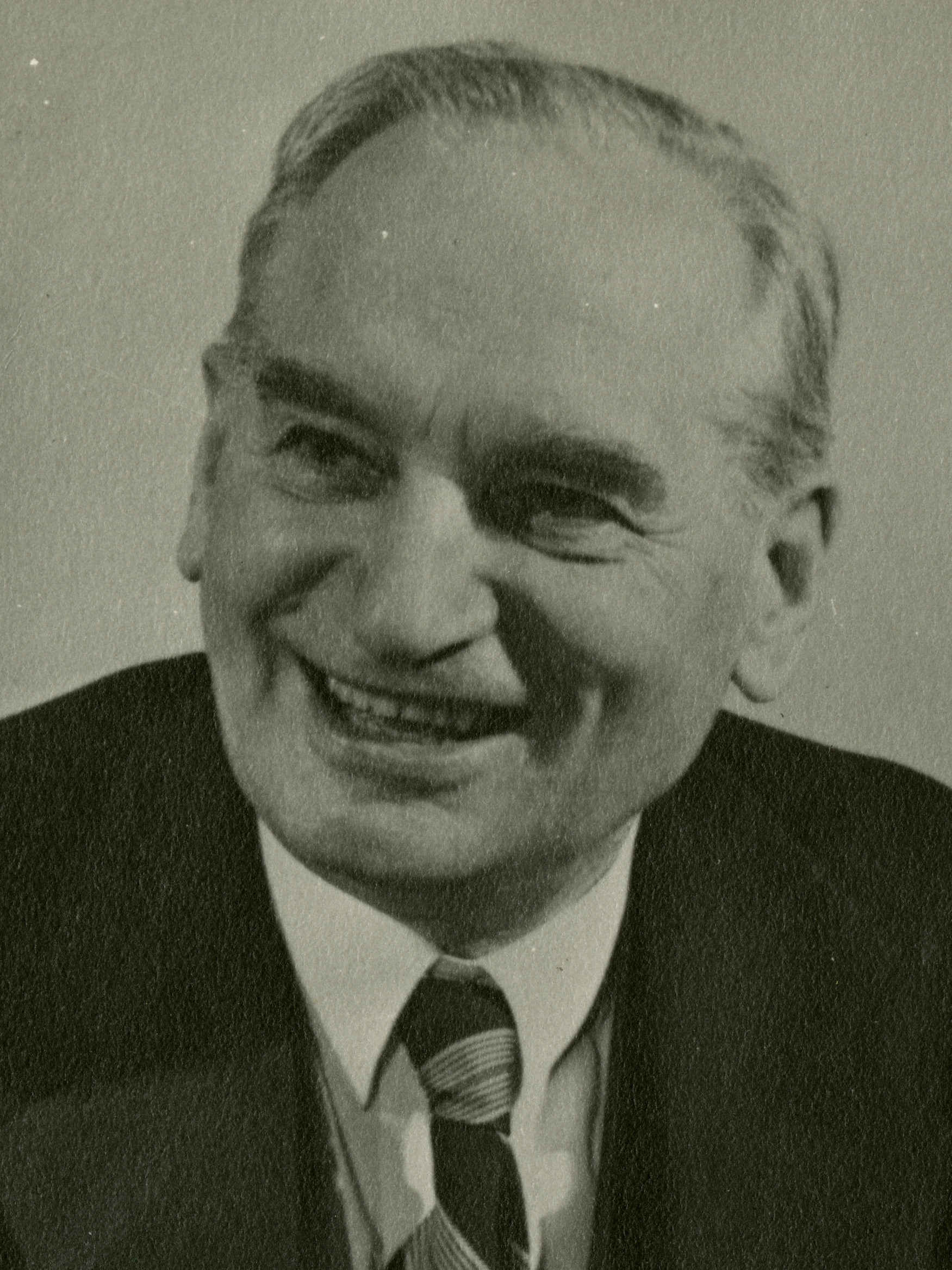

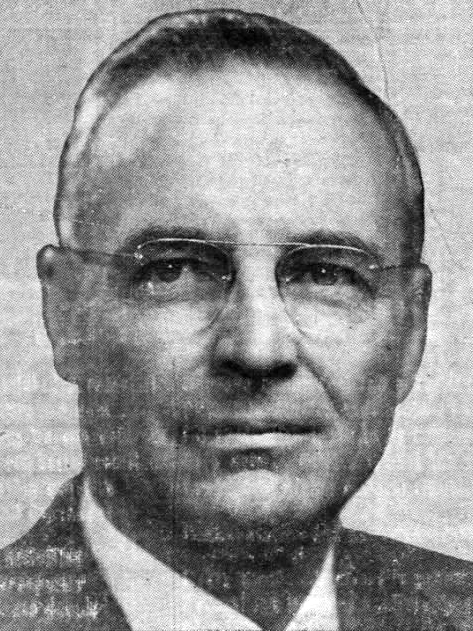
Nominee	William Langer	Harold Morrison	Fred G. Aandahl
Party	Republican	Democratic	Independent
Popular vote	157,907	55,347	24,741
Percentage	66.35%	23.26%	10.40%
- County results Langer: 50–60% 60–70% 70–80% 80–90%
Senator before election
William Langer
Republican
Elected Senator
William Langer
Republican

North Dakota election
Party	Candidate	Votes	%
Republican	William Langer (incumbent)	157,907	66.35
Democratic	Harold A. Morrison	55,347	23.26
Independent	Fred G. Aandahl (Write-in)	24,741	10.40
Majority		102,560	43.09
Turnout		204,635	38.41
Republican hold			

== Ohio ==
Ohio election
- November 4, 1952
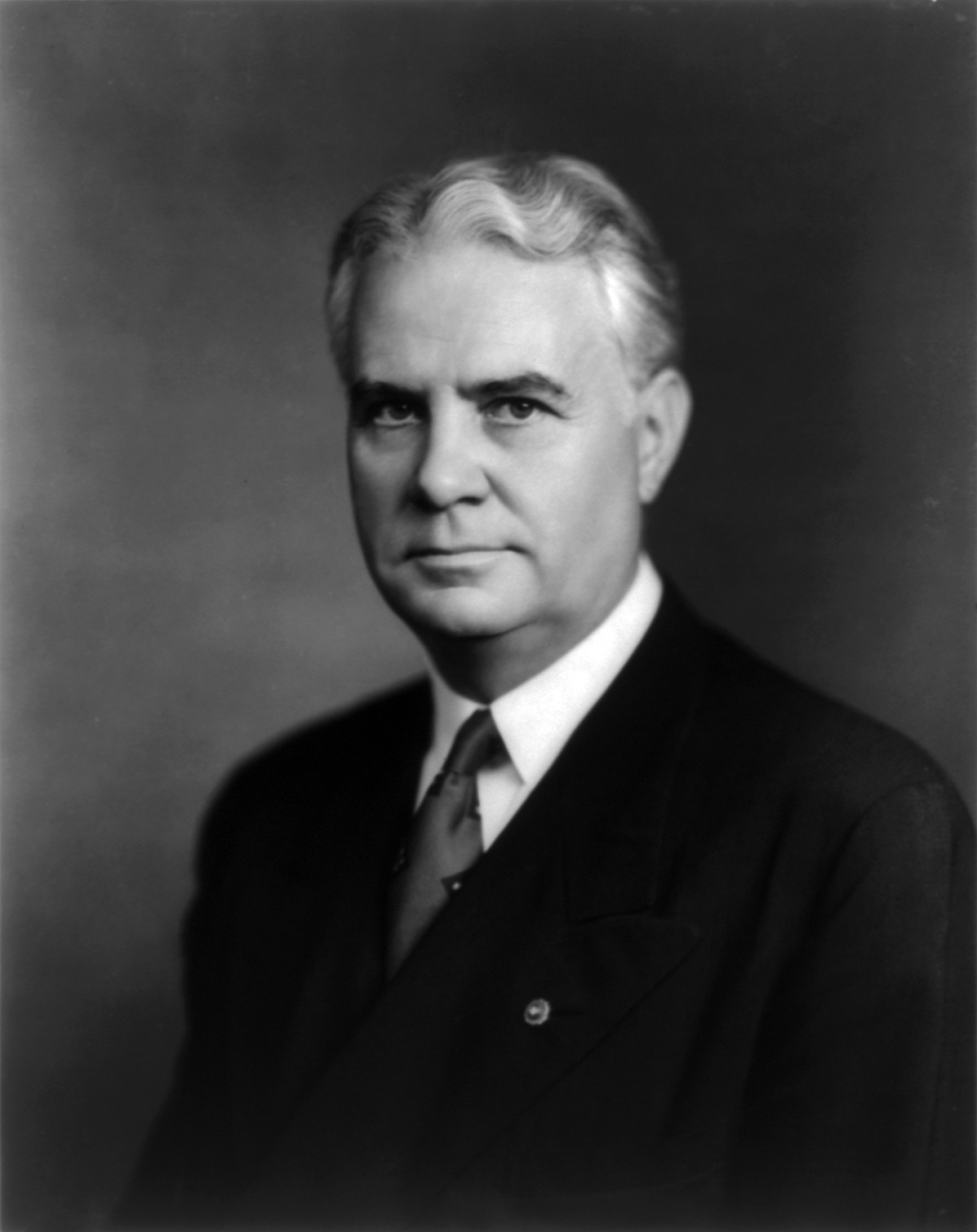

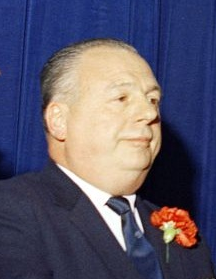
Nominee	John W. Bricker	Michael DiSalle
Party	Republican	Democratic
Popular vote	1,878,971	1,563,330
Percentage	54.58%	45.42%
- County results Bricker: 50–60% 60–70% 70–80% DiSalle: 50–60%
U.S. senator before election
John W. Bricker
Republican
Elected U.S. Senator
John W. Bricker
Republican

1952 United States Senate election in Ohio
Party	Candidate	Votes	%
Republican	John W. Bricker (incumbent)	1,878,961	54.58
Democratic	Michael V. DiSalle	1,563,330	45.42
Majority		295,631	9.16
Turnout		3,442,291	
Republican hold			

== Pennsylvania ==
1952 United States Senate election in Pennsylvania
- November 4, 1952
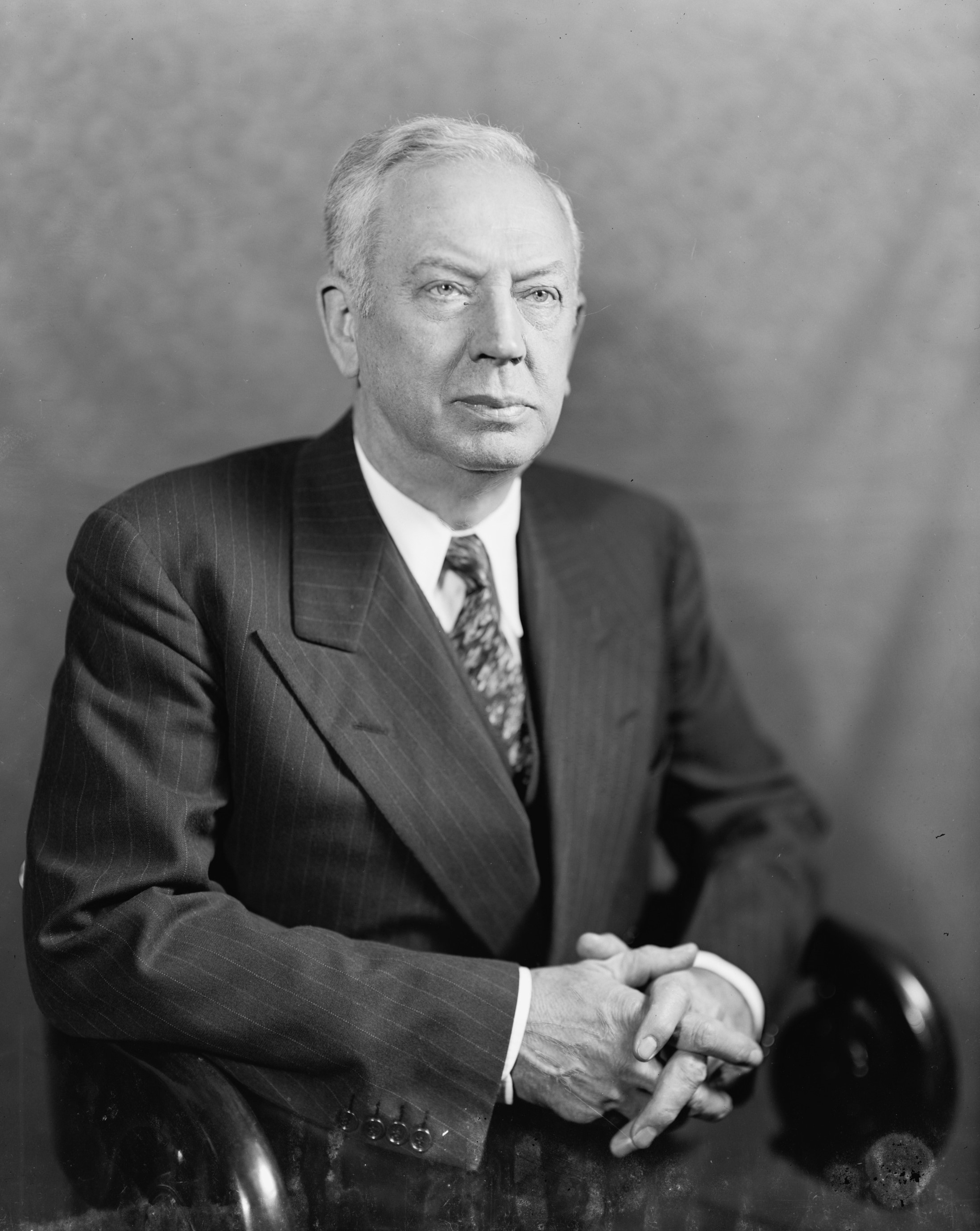

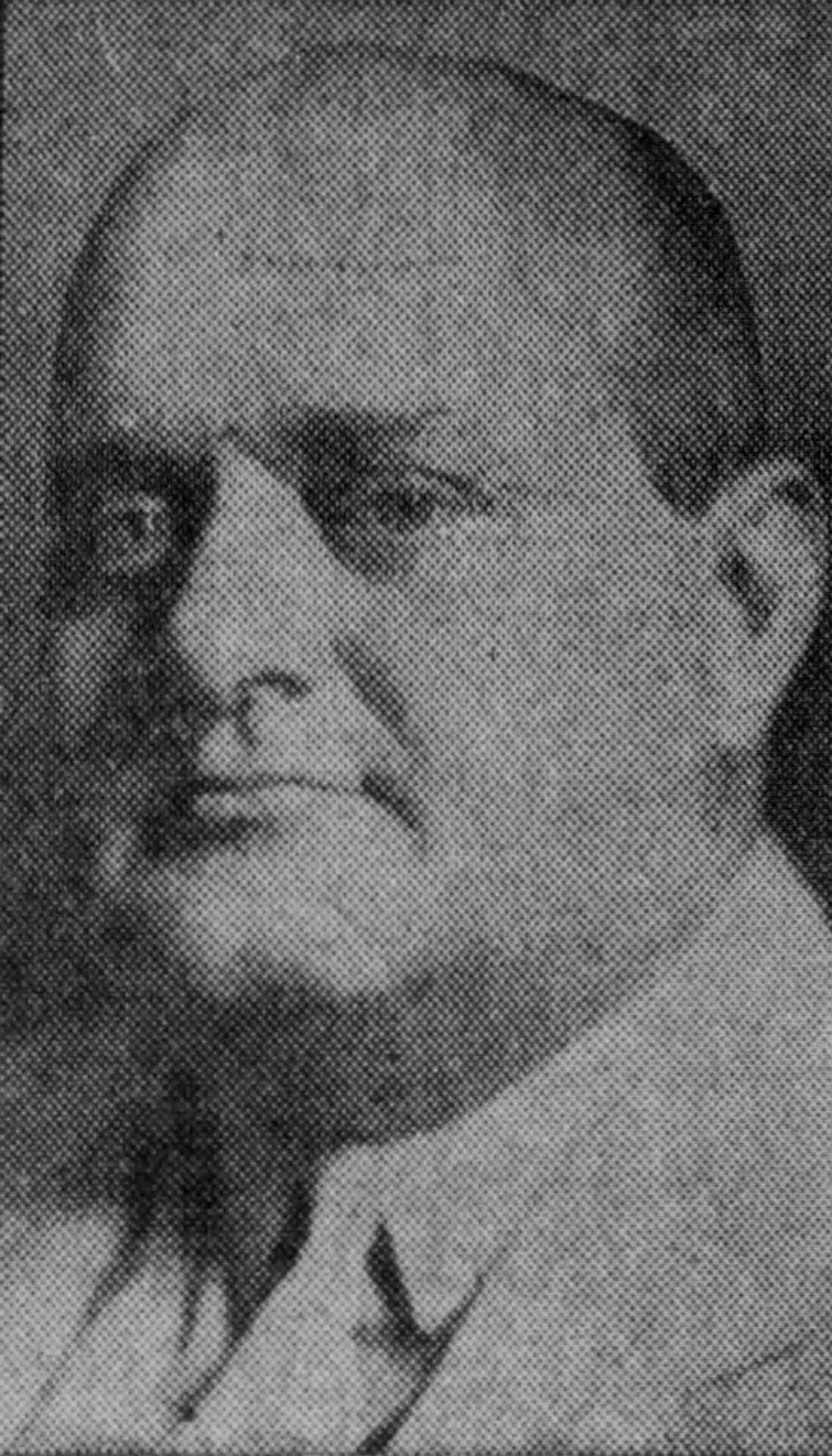
Nominee	Edward Martin	Guy K. Bard
Party	Republican	Democratic
Popular vote	2,331,034	2,168,546
Percentage	51.58%	47.98%
- County results Martin: 40–50% 50–60% 60–70% 70–80% Bard: 40–50% 50–60% 60–70%
U.S. senator before election
Edward Martin
Republican
Elected U.S. Senator
Edward Martin
Republican

1952 United States Senate election in Pennsylvania
Party	Candidate	Votes	%
Republican	Edward Martin (incumbent)	2,331,034	51.58
Democratic	Guy Kurtz Bard	2,168,546	47.98
Prohibition	Ira S. Sassaman	12,150	0.27
Socialist	William J. Van Essen	3,538	0.08
Militant Workers	Anna Chester	2,258	0.05
Independent Government	Frank Knotek	1,897	0.04
Majority		162,488	3.60
Turnout		4,519,423	
Republican hold			

== Rhode Island ==
1952 United States Senate election in Rhode Island
- November 4, 1952
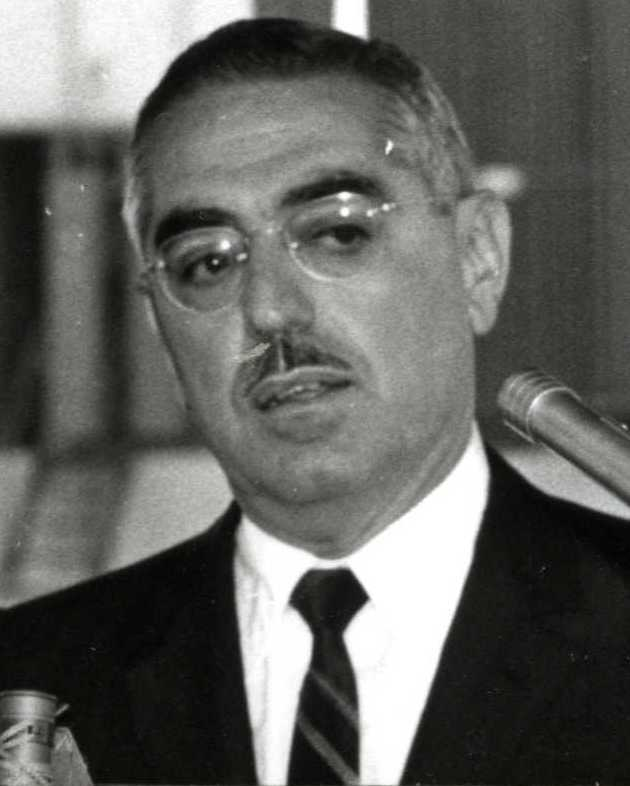

Nominee	John Pastore	Bayard Ewing
Party	Democratic	Republican
Popular vote	225,128	185,850
Percentage	54.78%	45.22%
- Pastore: 50–60% 60–70% Ewing: 50–60% 60–70% 70–80%
U.S. senator before election
John Pastore
Democratic
Elected U.S. Senator
John Pastore
Democratic

1952 United States Senate election in Rhode Island
Party	Candidate	Votes	%
Democratic	John O. Pastore (incumbent)	225,128	54.78
Republican	Bayard Ewing	185,850	45.22
Majority		39,278	9.56
Turnout		410,978	
Democratic hold			

== Tennessee ==
1952 United States Senate election in Tennessee
- November 4, 1952
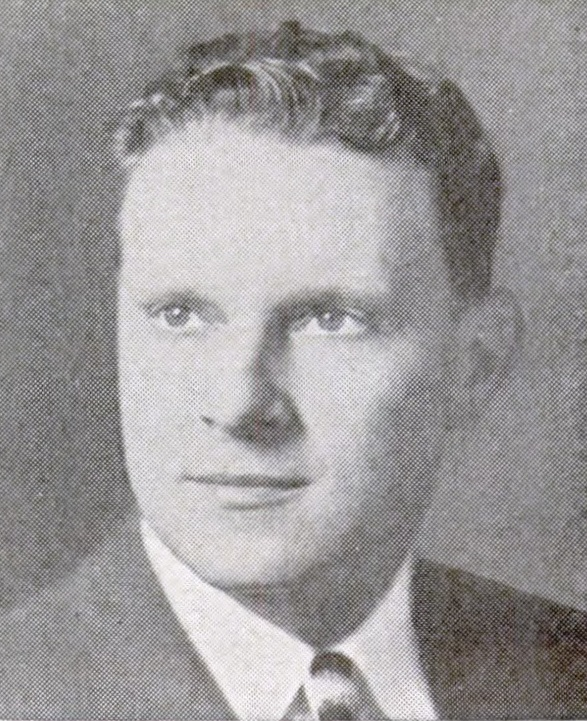

Nominee	Albert Gore Sr.	Hobart F. Atkins
Party	Democratic	Republican
Popular vote	545,432	153,479
Percentage	74.19%	20.88%
- County results Gore: 40–50% 50–60% 60–70% 70–80% 80–90% >90% Atkins: 50–60% 60–70% 70–80%
U.S. senator before election
Kenneth McKellar
Democratic
Elected U.S. senator
Albert Gore Sr.
Democratic

Democratic primary, August 7, 1952
Party	Candidate	Votes	%
Democratic	Albert Gore Sr.	334,957	56.54
Democratic	Kenneth D. McKellar (incumbent)	245,054	41.36
Democratic	John Randolph Neal Jr.	7,181	1.21
Democratic	Herman H. Ross	4,950	0.84
Democratic	James Patrick Sutton (Write-in)	293	0.05
Majority		89,903	15.18
Turnout			18.00

1952 United States Senate election in Tennessee
Party	Candidate	Votes	%
Democratic	Albert Gore Sr.	545,432	74.19
Republican	Hobart F. Atkins	153,479	20.88
Independent	Richard M. Barber	22,169	3.02
Good Government and Clean Elections	John Randolph Neal Jr.	14,132	1.92
Write-in	Write-ins	7	0.00
Majority		391,953	53.31
Turnout		735,219	
Democratic hold			

== Texas ==
Texas election
- November 4, 1952
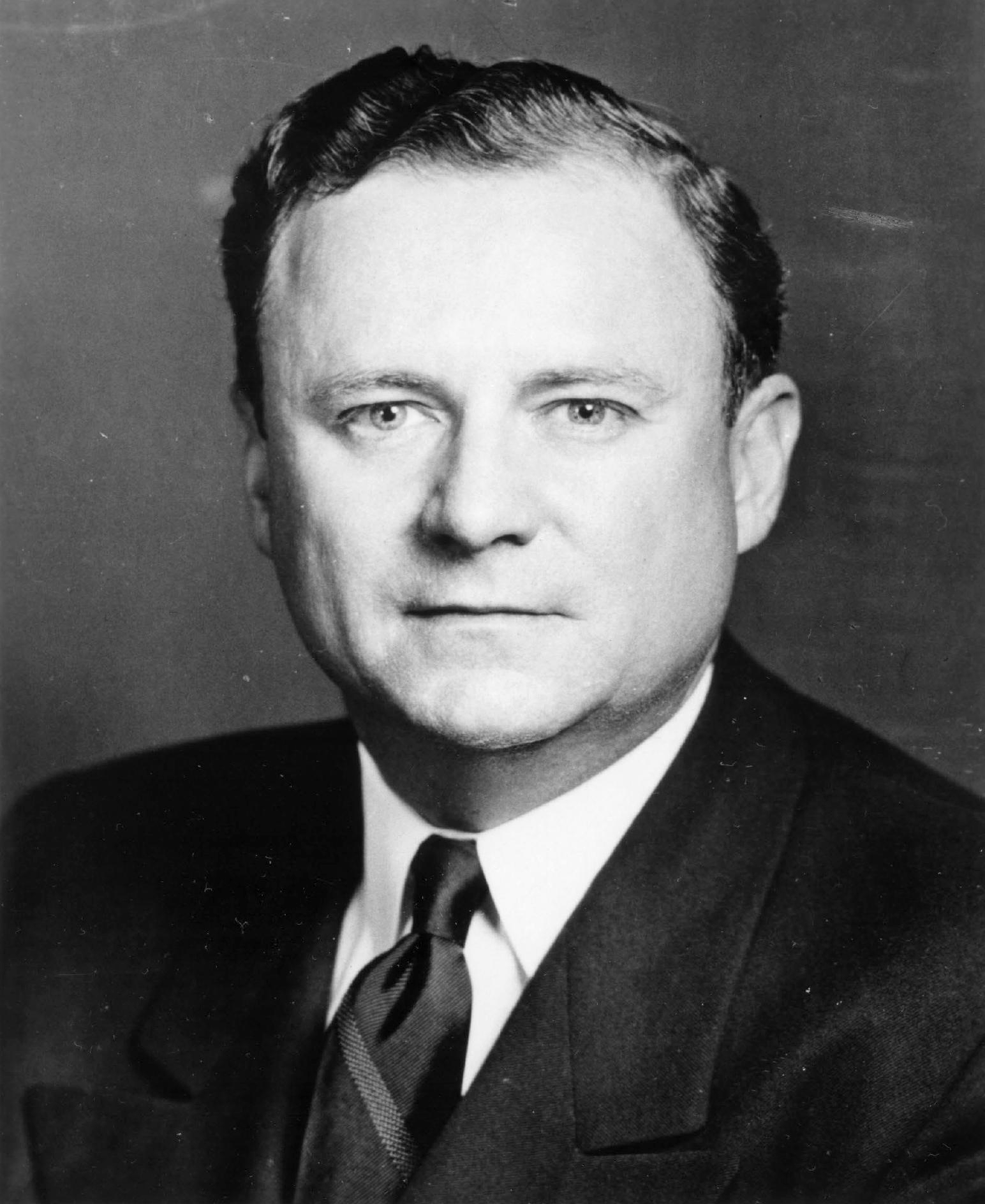
Nominee	Price Daniel
Party	Democratic
Alliance	Republican
Popular vote	1,895,192
Percentage	100.00%
- County results Daniel: 50–60% 60–70% 70–80% 80–90% 90–100% Daniel: 50–60% 60–70%
U.S. senator before election
Price Daniel
Democratic
Elected U.S. Senator
Price Daniel
Democratic

Incumbent Democratic U.S. Senator Tom Connally did not run for re-election to a fifth term.

Attorney General Price Daniel won the open race to succeed him, defeating U.S. Representative Lindley Beckworth in the Democratic primary on July 26. Daniel was unopposed in the general election, as the Texas Republican Party chose to endorse the Democratic ticket for all but one statewide office to maximize votes for their presidential nominee Dwight Eisenhower.

1952 United States Senate election in Texas
Party	Candidate	Votes	%	±%
Democratic	Price Daniel	1,425,007	75.19%	▼13.32
Republican	Price Daniel	469,594	24.78%	▲13.29
Independent	Price Daniel	591	0.03%	N/A
Total	Price Daniel	1,895,192	100.00%	N/A
Total votes		1,895,192	100.00%	
Democratic hold				

== Utah ==
1952 United States Senate election in Utah
- November 4, 1952
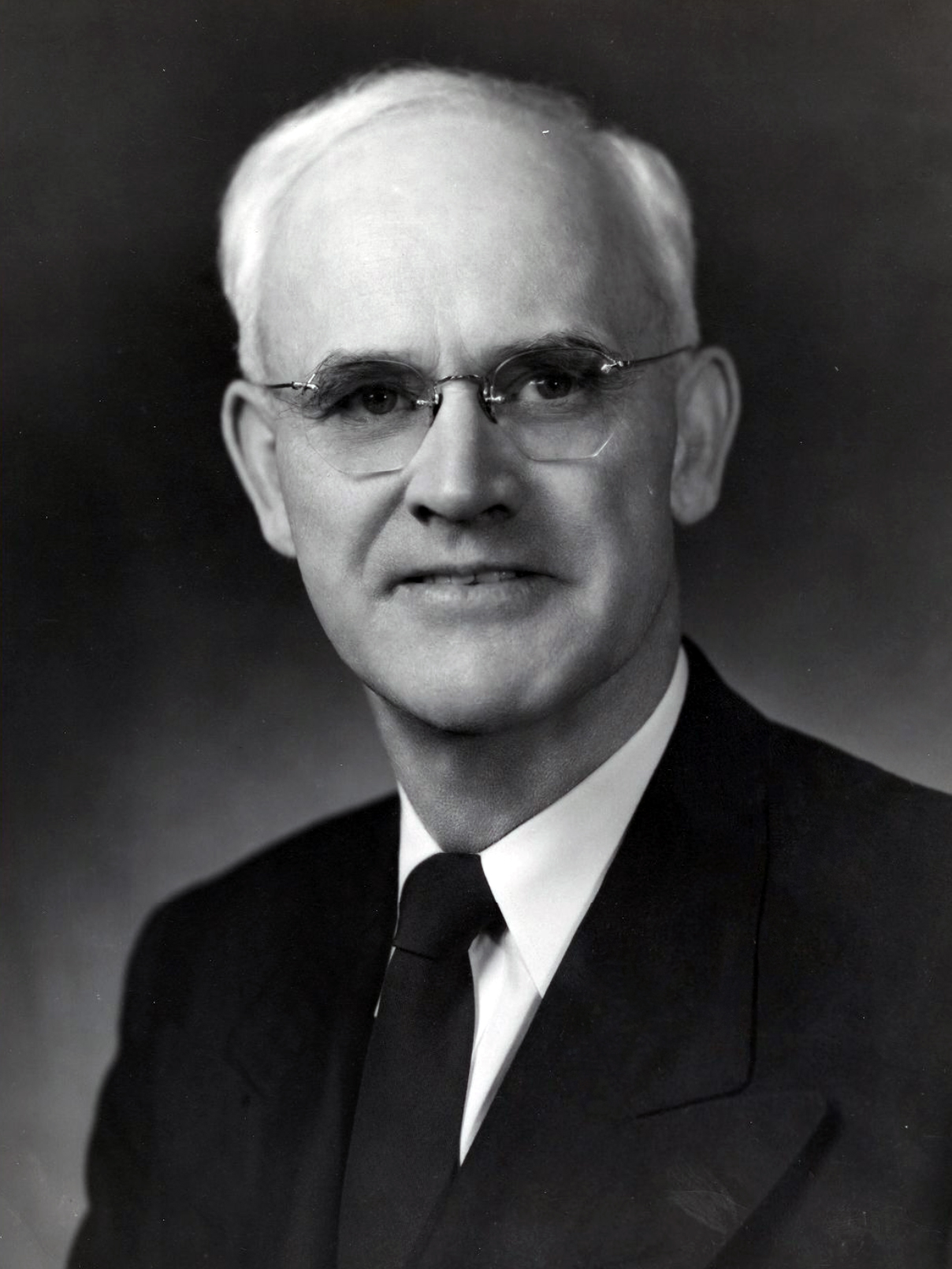

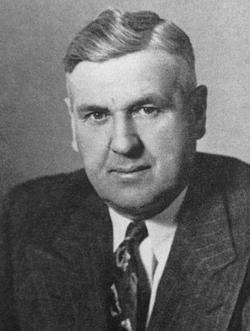
Nominee	Arthur V. Watkins	Walter K. Granger
Party	Republican	Democratic
Popular vote	177,435	149,598
Percentage	54.26%	45.74%
- County results Watkins: 50–60% 60–70% 70–80% Granger: 50–60% 60–70%
U.S. senator before election
Arthur V. Watkins
Republican
Elected U.S. Senator
Arthur V. Watkins
Republican

1952 United States Senate election in Utah
Party	Candidate	Votes	%
Republican	Arthur V. Watkins (incumbent)	177,435	54.26
Democratic	Walter K. Granger	149,598	45.74
Majority		27,837	8.52
Turnout		327,033	
Republican hold			

== Vermont ==
Vermont election
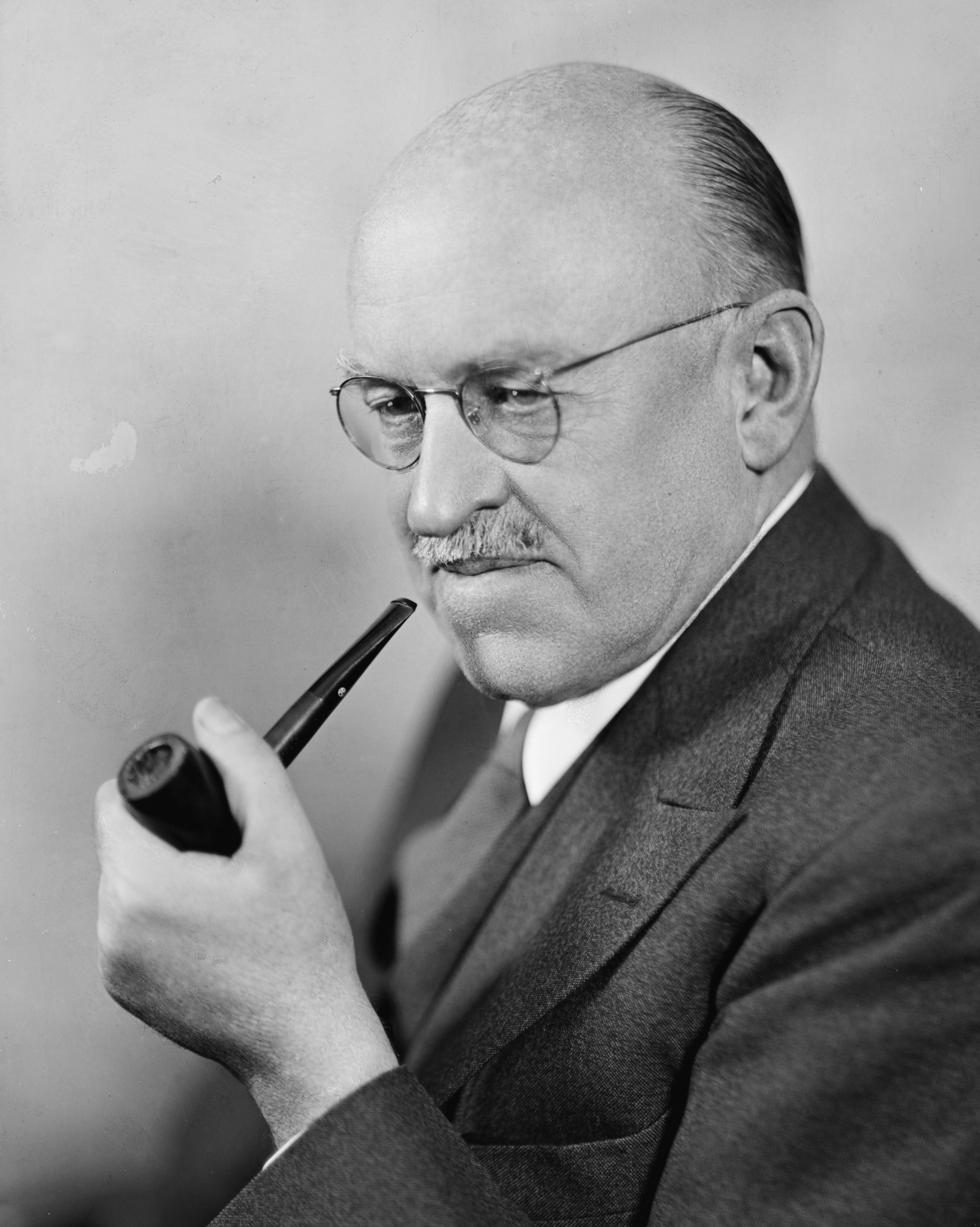

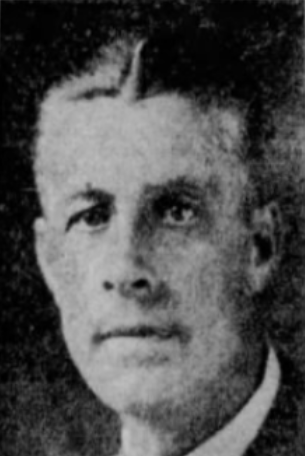
Nominee	Ralph Flanders	Allan R. Johnston
Party	Republican	Democratic
Popular vote	111,406	42,630
Percentage	72.3%	27.7%
U.S. senator before election
Ralph Flanders
Republican
Elected U.S. Senator
Ralph Flanders
Republican

United States Senate election in Vermont, 1952
Party	Candidate	Votes	%
Republican	Ralph Flanders (incumbent)	111,406	72.3
Democratic	Allan R. Johnston	42,630	27.7
N/A	Other	16	0.0
Total votes		154,052	100
Republican hold			

== Virginia ==
Virginia election
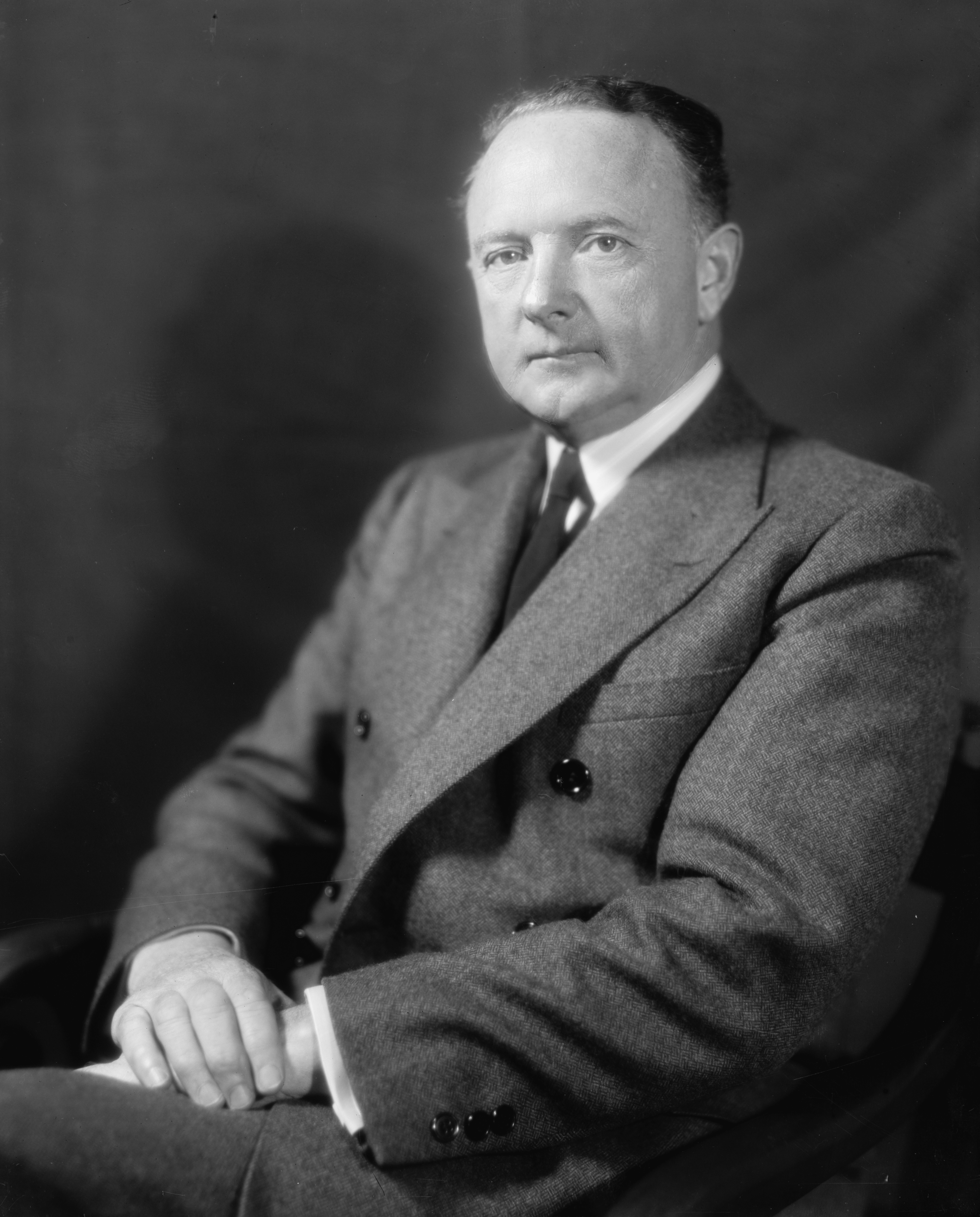

Nominee	Harry F. Byrd	H. M. Vise Sr.
Party	Democratic	Independent Democratic
Popular vote	398,677	69,133
Percentage	73.4%	12.7%
Nominee	Clarke T. Robb
Party	Social Democratic
Popular vote	67,281
Percentage	12.4%
- County and independent city results Byrd: 40–50% 50–60% 60–70% 70–80% 80–90% Vise: 40–50%
U.S. senator before election
Harry F. Byrd
Democratic
Elected U.S. Senator
Harry F. Byrd
Democratic

1952 United States Senate election in Virginia
Party	Candidate	Votes	%	±%
Democratic	Harry F. Byrd (incumbent)	398,677	73.35	+8.51%
Independent Democratic	H. M. Vise Sr.	69,133	12.72	+12.72%
Social Democratic	Clarke T. Robb	67,281	12.38	+11.75%
Write-in		8,425	1.55	+1.54%
Majority		329,544	60.63	
Turnout		543,516		
Democratic hold		Swing		

== Washington ==
1952 United States Senate election in Washington
- November 4, 1952
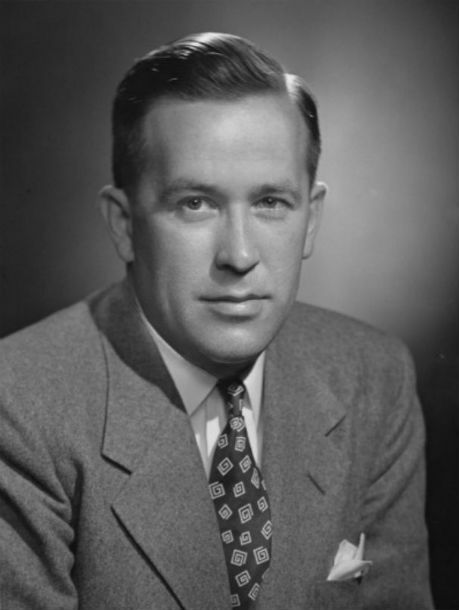

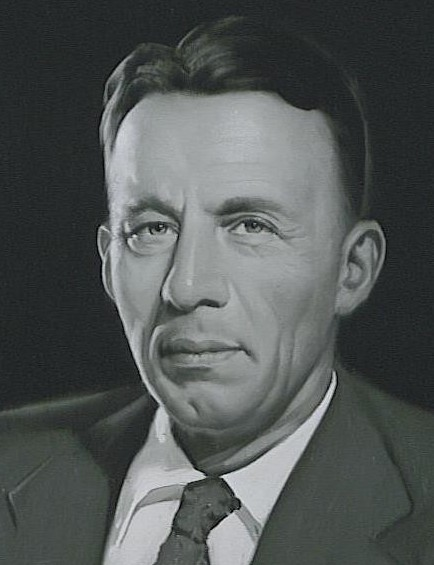
Nominee	Henry M. Jackson	Harry Cain
Party	Democratic	Republican
Popular vote	595,288	460,884
Percentage	56.23%	43.53%
- County results Jackson: 50–60% 60–70% Cain: 50–60% 60–70%
U.S. senator before election
Harry Cain
Republican
Elected U.S. Senator
Henry M. Jackson
Democratic

1952 United States Senate election in Washington
Party	Candidate	Votes	%
Democratic	Henry M. Jackson	595,288	56.23
Republican	Harry P. Cain (incumbent)	460,884	43.53
Progressive	Thomas C. Rabbitt	1,912	0.18
Socialist Labor	Henry Killman	651	0.06
Majority		134,404	12.70
Turnout		1,058,735	
Democratic gain from Republican			

== West Virginia ==
1952 United States Senate election in West Virginia
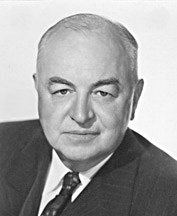

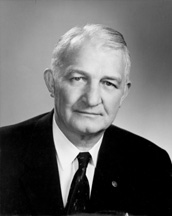
Nominee	Harley M. Kilgore	Chapman Revercomb
Party	Democratic	Republican
Popular vote	470,019	406,554
Percentage	53.62%	46.38%
County results
Kilgore:
50–60%
60–70%
70–80%
Revercomb:
50–60%
60–70%
70–80%
80–90%
U.S. senator before election
Harley M. Kilgore
Democratic
Elected U.S. Senator
Harley M. Kilgore
Democratic

1952 United States Senate election in West Virginia
Party	Candidate	Votes	%
Democratic	Harley M. Kilgore (incumbent)	470,019	53.62
Republican	Chapman Revercomb	406,554	46.38
Majority		63,465	7.24
Turnout		876,573	
Democratic hold			

== Wisconsin ==
Wisconsin election
- November 4, 1952
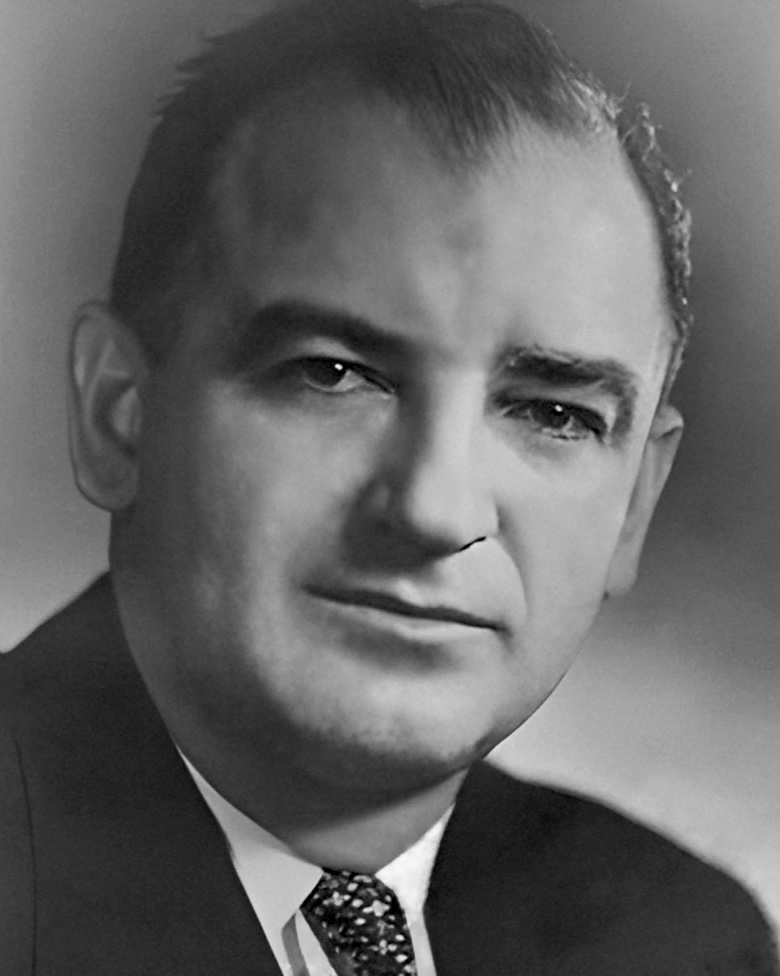

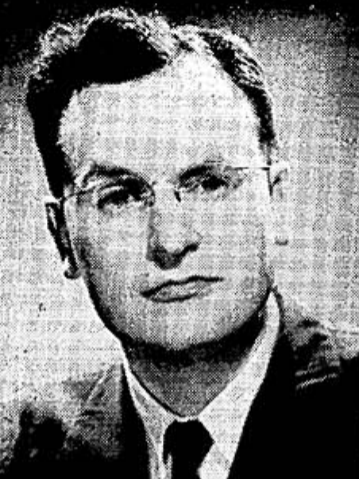
Nominee	Joseph McCarthy	Thomas E. Fairchild
Party	Republican	Democratic
Popular vote	870,444	731,402
Percentage	54.23%	45.57%
- County results McCarthy: 50–60% 60–70% 70–80% 80–90% Fairfield: 50–60% 60–70%
U.S. senator before election
Joseph McCarthy
Republican
Elected U.S. Senator
Joseph McCarthy
Republican

1952 United States Senate election in Wisconsin
Party	Candidate	Votes	%
Republican	Joseph McCarthy (incumbent)	870,444	54.23
Democratic	Thomas E. Fairchild	731,402	45.56
Independent	Alfred L. Easterday	1,879	0.12
Independent	James E. Boulton	1,442	0.09
None	Scattering	61	0.00
Majority		139,042	8.67
Turnout		1,605,228	
Republican hold			

== Wyoming ==
Wyoming election
- November 4, 1952
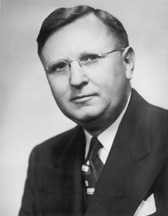

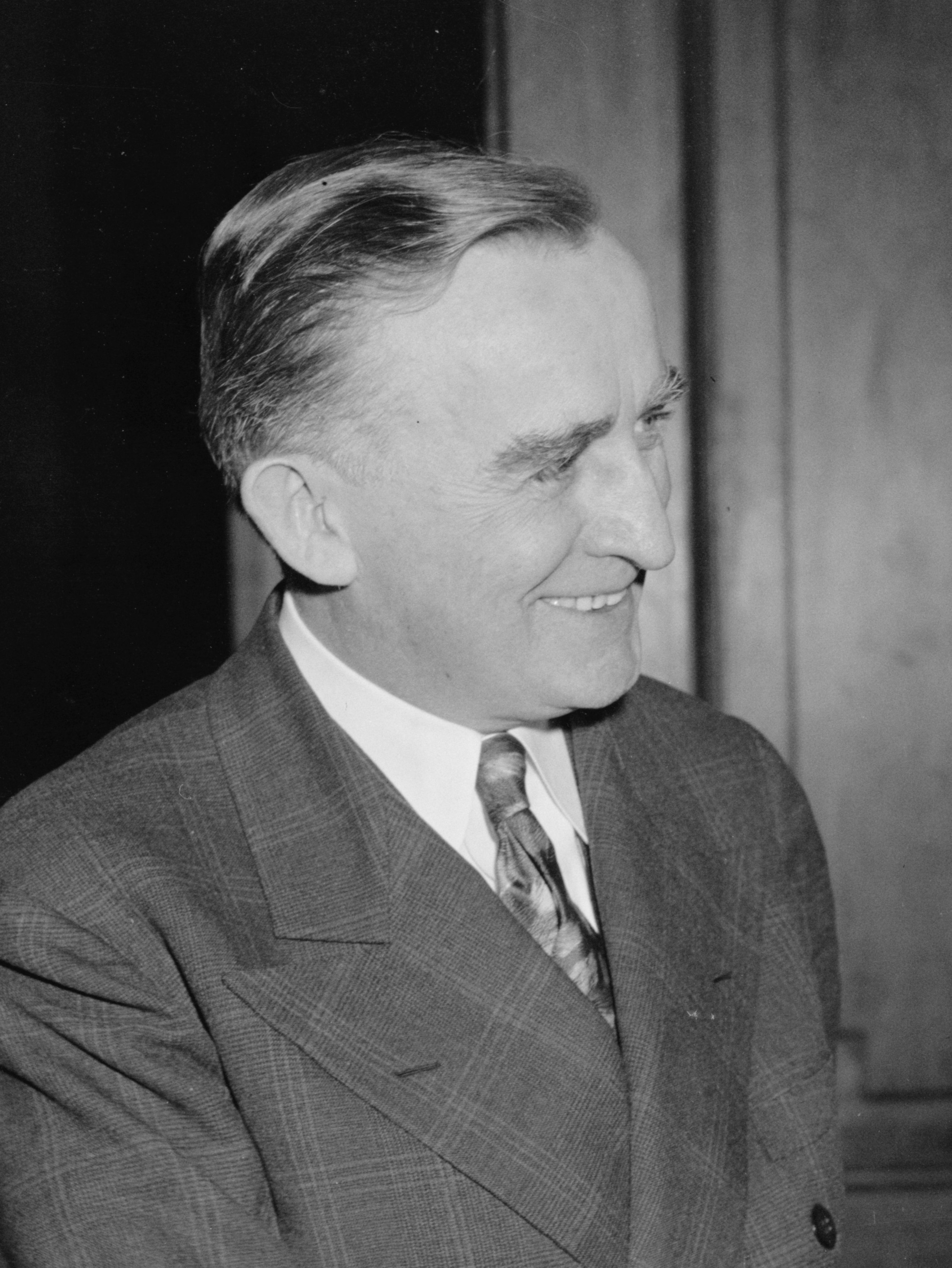
Nominee	Frank A. Barrett	Joseph C. O'Mahoney
Party	Republican	Democratic
Popular vote	67,176	62,921
Percentage	51.64%	48.36%
- County results Barrett: 50–60% 60–70% 70–80% O'Mahoney: 50–60% 60–70% 70–80%
U.S. senator before election
Joseph C. O'Mahoney
Democratic
Elected U.S. Senator
Frank A. Barrett
Republican

1952 United States Senate election in Wyoming
Party	Candidate	Votes	%
Republican	Frank A. Barrett	67,176	51.64
Democratic	Joseph C. O'Mahoney (incumbent)	62,921	48.36
Majority		4,255	3.28
Turnout		130,097	
Republican gain from Democratic			

== See also ==
- 1952 United States elections
  - 1952 United States presidential election
  - 1952 United States House of Representatives elections
- 82nd United States Congress
- 83rd United States Congress

== Sources ==
- "FINAL STATE COUNT GIVES RECORD VOTE; Eisenhower Carried New York by 848,214 Margin as Total of 7,216,054 Cast Ballots". The New York Times. December 9, 1952.
