= 1952 United States Senate election in Delaware =

- November 4, 1952
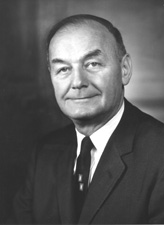

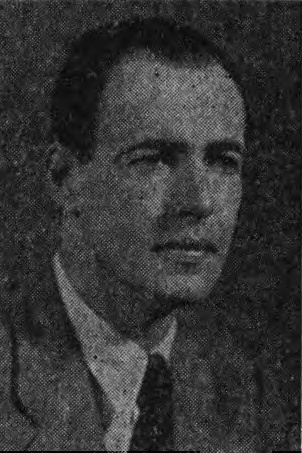
Nominee	John J. Williams	Alexis I. du Pont Bayard
Party	Republican	Democratic
Popular vote	93,020	77,685
Percentage	54.49%	45.51%
- County results Williams: 50–60%
U.S. senator before election
John J. Williams
Republican
Elected U.S. Senator
John J. Williams
Republican

The 1952 United States Senate election in Delaware took place on November 4, 1952. Incumbent Republican U.S. Senator John J. Williams was re-elected to a second term in office over Democratic Lieutenant Governor Alexis I. du Pont Bayard, the son of former Senator Thomas F. Bayard, Jr. and descendant of two of Delaware's most powerful families, the du Ponts and the Bayards.

== General election ==
=== Candidates ===
- Alexis I. du Pont Bayard, Lieutenant Governor of Delaware (Democratic)
- John J. Williams, incumbent U.S. Senator since 1947 (Republican)

=== Results ===
1952 U.S. Senate election in Delaware
Party	Candidate	Votes	%	±%
Republican	John J. Williams (inc.)	93,020	54.49%	▼0.66
Democratic	Alexis I. du Pont Bayard	77,685	45.51%	▲0.66
Total votes		170,705	100.00%	
Republican hold				

== See also ==
- 1952 United States Senate elections
