= 1952 United States Senate election in Virginia =

- November 4, 1952
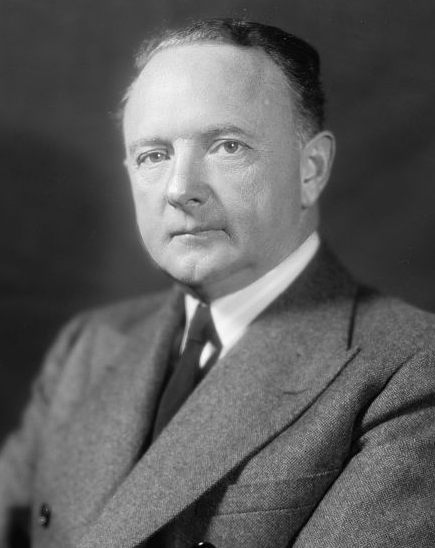

Nominee	Harry F. Byrd Sr.	H. M. Vise Sr.	Clarke T. Robb
Party	Democratic	Independent Democrat	Independent
Popular vote	398,677	69,133	67,281
Percentage	73.35%	12.72%	12.38%
- County and independent city results Byrd: 40–50% 50–60% 60–70% 70–80% 80–90% Vise: 40–50%
U.S. senator before election
Harry F. Byrd Sr.
Democratic
Elected U.S. Senator
Harry F. Byrd Sr.
Democratic

The 1952 United States Senate election in Virginia was held on November 4, 1952. Incumbent Senator Harry F. Byrd Sr. was re-elected to a fifth term after defeating Independent Democrat H. M. Vise Sr. and Independent Clarke Robb.

== Results ==
1952 United States Senate election in Virginia
Party	Candidate	Votes	%	±%
Democratic	Harry F. Byrd Sr. (Incumbent)	398,677	73.35%	+8.51%
Independent Democratic	H. M. Vise Sr.	69,133	12.72%	+12.72%
Independent	Clarke T. Robb	67,281	12.38%	+11.75%
Write-ins		8,425	1.55%	+1.54%
Majority		329,544	60.63%	
Turnout		543,516		
Democratic hold				
