= Alexis I. du Pont Bayard =

American politician (1918–1985)

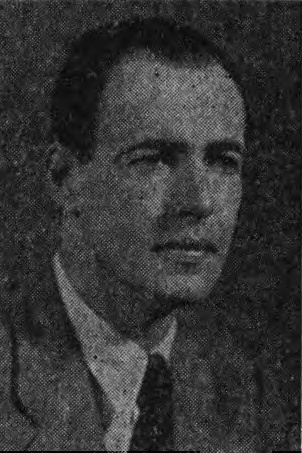
- Bayard in a 1953 publication

13th Lieutenant Governor of Delaware
- In office January 20, 1949 – January 15, 1953
- Governor: Elbert N. Carvel
- Preceded by: Elbert N. Carvel
- Succeeded by: John W. Rollins

Personal details
- Born: Alexis Irénée du Pont Bayard; February 11, 1918 Wilmington, Delaware, U.S.
- Died: September 3, 1985 (aged 67) Philadelphia, Pennsylvania, U.S.
- Resting place: Old Swedes Episcopal Church Cemetery
- Party: Democratic
- Spouse: Jane Brady Hildreth (m. 1944)
- Children: 6
- Parent(s): Thomas F. Bayard Jr. Elizabeth Bradford du Pont
- Education: Princeton University; University of Virginia School of Law
- Profession: Lawyer

Military service
- Branch/service: United States Marine Corps
- Battles/wars: World War II; Battle of Iwo Jima (WIA)

Alexis Irénée du Pont Bayard (February 11, 1918 – September 3, 1985) was an American lawyer and politician from Rockland, near Greenville, in New Castle County, Delaware. A member of the Democratic Party, he served as the 13th Lieutenant Governor of Delaware from 1949 to 1953 and ran unsuccessfully for the United States Senate in 1952.

== Early life ==
Bayard was born in Wilmington, Delaware, son of U.S. Senator Thomas F. Bayard Jr. and Elizabeth Bradford du Pont Bayard. He was named after his maternal great-grandfather, Alexis Irénée du Pont. Bayard was the scion of two prominent Delaware families. On his father's side, Alexis descended from the politically powerful Bayard family. The Bayards had long been bulwarks of Delaware's Democratic Party, with each of the previous five generations of the Bayard family having represented Delaware in the United States Senate. Bayard's mother, Elizabeth Bradford du Pont, was the daughter of Alexis Irénée du Pont Jr., granddaughter of Alexis Irénée du Pont, and great-granddaughter of Eleuthère Irénée du Pont. He was the founder of E. I. du Pont de Nemours and Company, the gunpowder and chemicals company that grew to dominate northern Delaware in the early twentieth century. By this time the du Ponts were a large and enormously wealthy family, many of whom were involved in the political life of Delaware.

Bayard attended St. Paul's School in Concord, New Hampshire. He graduated from Princeton University in 1940. He later attended the University of Virginia School of Law and was admitted to the bar in 1948.

== Career ==
=== World War II ===
During World War II, he served in the United States Marine Corps. He was wounded during the Battle of Iwo Jima.

=== Political career ===
A war era veteran with a well-known name, the 30-year-old Bayard was elected lieutenant governor in 1948, defeating Republican Chester V. Townsend Jr. of Dagsboro, who was speaker of the Delaware House of Representatives. He served as lieutenant governor from January 20, 1949, until January 15, 1953. In 1948 he also served as an alternate delegate to the Democratic National Convention.

Bayard lost a bid for a seat in the United States Senate in 1952 to the incumbent Republican U.S. Senator John J. Williams. Bayard's inexperience and aristocratic roots compared unfavorably to Williams' "rags-to-riches" rise from chicken farmer to national figure. These factors, along with Williams' reputation for honesty, integrity, fairness, and bipartisanship in the U.S. Senate and the popularity of the Republicans' U.S. presidential candidate, Dwight D. Eisenhower, led the incumbent to a ten-point victory over Bayard at the polls.

After his defeat by Williams, Bayard resumed his law practice in Wilmington and remained an active supporter of the Democratic Party. In 1954, he served as campaign chairman of the Delaware Democratic Committee. In 1967, he became the state Democratic chairman. In 1970, he became a member of the finance committee of the Democratic National Committee and held this position until his death.

In 1961 he joined what had been the Herrmann & Duffy law firm in Wilmington; at the time of his death the firm was Bayard, Handelman & Murdoch.

== Personal life ==
Coat of Arms of Alexis I. du Pont Bayard

He married Jane Brady Hildreth on April 24, 1944. They had six children: Alexis I., Eugene H., Richard H., John F., William B. and Jane H.

He was known as "Lex" in his law practice.

== Death ==
Bayard died in Philadelphia, Pennsylvania, on September 3, 1985, during heart-bypass surgery at Graduate Hospital. He was buried at the Old Swedes Episcopal Church Cemetery in Wilmington, Delaware, alongside his father, grandfather, and great-grandfather.

=== Legacy ===
Bayard was the last member of his line to be elected to public office, thus ending a six-generation tradition. After his death, the Alexis I. du Pont Bayard Award was created for distinguished service to the party. His son, Richard H. Bayard, has served as chairman of the Delaware Democratic Party.

== Almanac ==
Elections are held the first Tuesday after November 1. The lieutenant governor takes office the third Tuesday of January and has a four-year term.

Public offices
Office	Type	Location	Began office	Ended office	Notes
Lt. governor	Executive	Dover	January 20, 1949	January 15, 1953	

Election results
Year	Office	Subject	Party	Votes	%	Opponent	Party	Votes	%
1948	Lt. governor	Alexis I. du Pont Bayard	Democratic	74,605	53%	Chester V. Townsend Jr.	Republican	65,545	47%
1952	U.S. senator	Alexis I. du Pont Bayard	Democratic	77,685	45%	John J. Williams	Republican	93,020	55%

Party political offices
Preceded by Elbert N. Carvel	Democratic nominee for Lieutenant Governor of Delaware; 1948	Succeeded by Vernon B. Derrickson
Preceded by James M. Tunnell	Democratic Party nominee for United States senator (class 1) from Delaware; 1952	Succeeded by Elbert N. Carvel
