= 1934 United States Senate election in Virginia =

- November 6, 1934
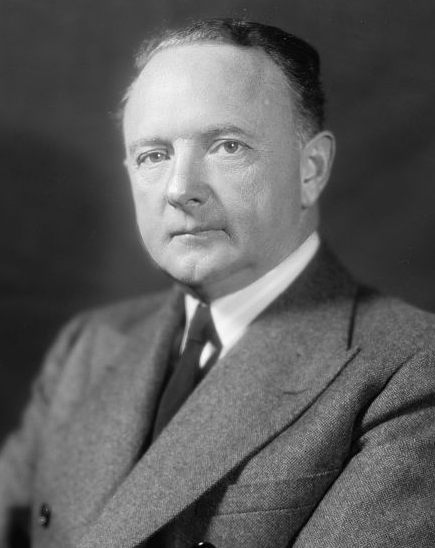

Nominee	Harry F. Byrd, Sr.	Lawrence C. Page
Party	Democratic	Republican
Popular vote	109,963	30,289
Percentage	75.96%	20.92%
- County and independent city results Byrd: 50–60% 60–70% 70–80% 80–90% >90% Page: 50–60%
U.S. senator before election
Harry F. Byrd, Sr.
Democratic
Elected U.S. Senator
Harry F. Byrd, Sr.
Democratic

The 1934 United States Senate election in Virginia was held on November 6, 1934. Incumbent Senator Harry F. Byrd, Sr. was re-elected to his first full (and his second overall) term after defeating Republican Lawrence C. Page in a landslide.

== Results ==
United States Senate election in Virginia, 1934
Party	Candidate	Votes	%	±%
Democratic	Harry F. Byrd, Sr. (inc.)	109,963	75.96%	+4.65%
Republican	Lawrence C. Page	30,289	20.92%	−5.75%
Independent	J. L. Litz	1,503	1.04%	
Socialist	Herman R. Ansell	1,127	0.78%	+0.10%
Independent	John G. Bowman	1,046	0.72%	
Communist	Alexander Wright	431	0.30%	+0.30%
Prohibition	Hewman H. Raymond	391	0.27%	−0.15%
Write-ins		22	0.02%	+0.02%
Majority		79,674	55.03%	+10.39%
Turnout		144,772		
Democratic hold				
