= 1988 Delaware lieutenant gubernatorial election =

- November 8, 1988
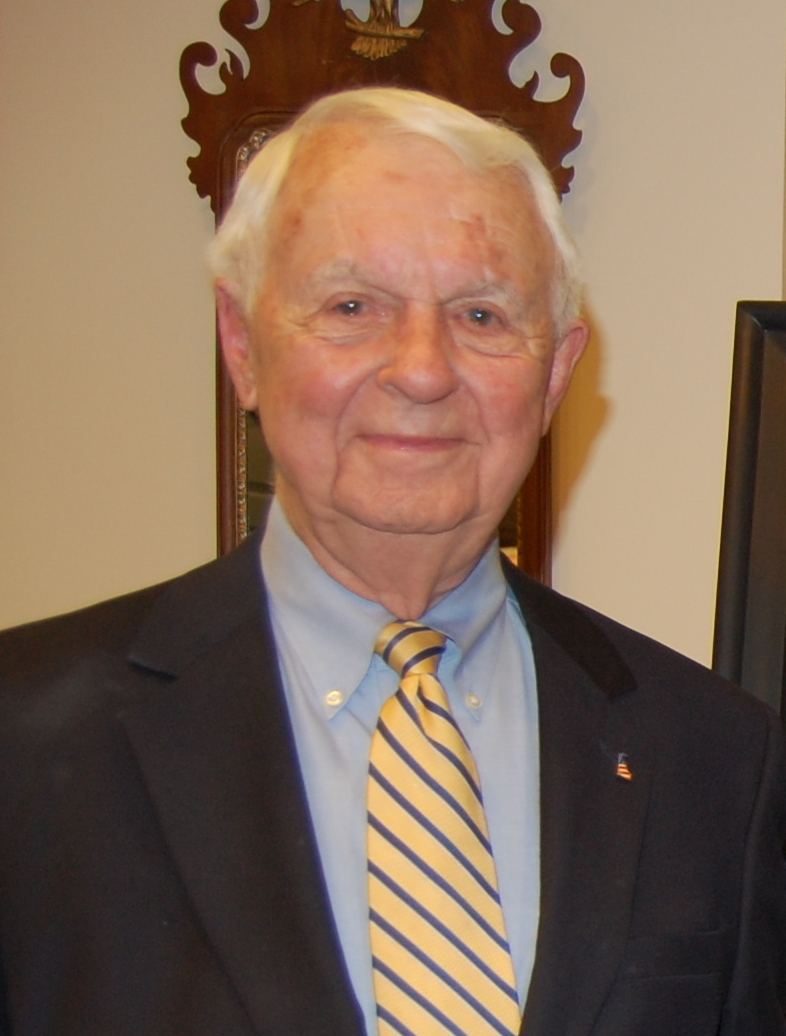

Nominee	Dale E. Wolf	Gary E. Hindes
Party	Republican	Democratic
Popular vote	128,144	111,240
Percentage	53.53%	46.47%
- Wolf: 50–60% 60–70% 70–80% Hindes: 50–60% 60–70% 80–90%
Lieutenant Governor before election
S. B. Woo
Democratic
Elected Lieutenant Governor
Dale E. Wolf
Republican

The 1988 Delaware lieutenant gubernatorial election was held on November 8, 1988, in order to elect the lieutenant governor of Delaware. Republican nominee Dale E. Wolf defeated Democratic nominee Gary E. Hindes. As of 2026, this is the last time a Republican was elected Lieutenant Governor of Delaware

== General election ==
On election day, November 8, 1988, Republican nominee Dale E. Wolf won the election by a margin of 16,904 votes against his opponent Democratic nominee Gary E. Hindes, thereby gaining Republican control over the office of lieutenant governor. Wolf was sworn in as the 22nd lieutenant governor of Delaware on January 17, 1989.

=== Results ===
Delaware lieutenant gubernatorial election, 1988
Party	Candidate	Votes	%
Republican	Dale E. Wolf	128,144	53.53
Democratic	Gary E. Hindes	111,240	46.47
Total votes		239,384	100.00
Republican gain from Democratic			
