= 1976 Delaware lieutenant gubernatorial election =

- November 2, 1976
Nominee	James D. McGinnis	Andrew Foltz
Party	Democratic	Republican
Popular vote	110,328	107,075
Percentage	50.36%	48.87%
- McGinnis: 40–50% 50–60% 60–70% 70–80% Foltz: 50–60% 60–70% 70–80%
Lieutenant Governor before election
Eugene Bookhammer
Republican
Elected Lieutenant Governor
James D. McGinnis
Democratic

The 1976 Delaware lieutenant gubernatorial election was held on November 2, 1976, in order to elect the lieutenant governor of Delaware. Democratic nominee and incumbent member of the Delaware House of Representatives James D. McGinnis defeated Republican nominee Andrew Foltz, American nominee Margaret Mercer and Prohibition nominee Robert Appling.

== General election ==
On election day, November 2, 1976, Democratic nominee James D. McGinnis won the election by a margin of 3,253 votes against his foremost opponent Republican nominee Andrew Foltz, thereby gaining Democratic control over the office of lieutenant governor. McGinnis was sworn in as the 19th lieutenant governor of Delaware on January 18, 1977.

=== Results ===
Delaware lieutenant gubernatorial election, 1976
Party	Candidate	Votes	%
Democratic	James D. McGinnis	110,328	50.36
Republican	Andrew Foltz	107,075	48.87
American	Margaret Mercer	1,394	0.64
Prohibition	Robert Appling	295	0.13
Total votes		219,092	100.00
Democratic gain from Republican			
