= 1992 Delaware gubernatorial election =

- November 3, 1992
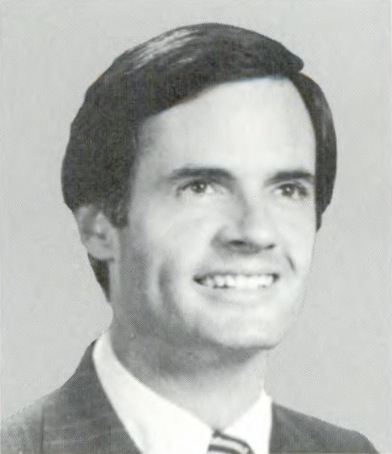

Nominee	Tom Carper	B. Gary Scott
Party	Democratic	Republican
Running mate	Ruth Ann Minner	Sherman N. Miller
Popular vote	179,365	90,725
Percentage	64.74%	32.75%
- Carper: 50–60% 60–70% 70–80% 80–90%
Governor before election
Dale E. Wolf
Republican
Elected Governor
Tom Carper
Democratic

The 1992 Delaware gubernatorial election took place on November 3, 1992. Incumbent Republican governor Mike Castle, barred by term limits from seeking another term as Governor of Delaware, instead sought election to the United States House of Representatives. Congressman and Democratic nominee Tom Carper defeated Republican nominee B. Gary Scott in a landslide, winning his first term in office and becoming Delaware's first Democratic governor since 1977.

This was the first time since 1964 that New Castle County voted Democratic for governor. As of 2026, this is the last time the Governor's office in Delaware changed partisan control.

== Democratic primary ==
=== Candidates ===
- Tom Carper, U.S. representative, former Delaware state treasurer
- Daniel D. Rappa

=== Results ===
Democratic Party primary results
Party	Candidate	Votes	%
Democratic	Tom Carper	36,600	89.19
Democratic	Daniel D. Rappa	4,434	10.81
Total votes		41,034	100.00

== Republican primary ==
=== Candidates ===
- B. Gary Scott, insurance company executive
- Wilfred Plomis

=== Results ===
Republican Party primary results
Party	Candidate	Votes	%
Republican	B. Gary Scott	23,994	81.78
Republican	Wilfred Plomis	5,346	18.22
Total votes		29,340	100.00

== General election ==
=== Results ===
Delaware gubernatorial election, 1992
Party	Candidate	Votes	%	±%
Democratic	Tom Carper	179,365	64.74%	+35.48%
Republican	B. Gary Scott	90,725	32.75%	−37.98%
A Delaware Party	Floyd E. McDowell	3,779	1.36%	
Libertarian	Richard A. Cohen	3,165	1.14%	
Majority		88,640	32.00%	−9.47%
Turnout		277,034		
Democratic gain from Republican		Swing		

==== By county ====
County	Tom Carper Democratic		Gary Scott Republican		All Others Independent	
County	#	%	#	%	#	%
Kent	24,734	63.2%	13,406	34.2%	1,418	2.6%
New Castle	124,601	66.2%	58,609	31.1%	5,047	2.7%
Sussex	30,030	60.5%	18,710	37.7%	903	1.8%
Totals	179,365	64.7%	90,725	32.7%	6,968	2.5%

Counties that flipped from Republican to Democratic

- All 3
