= 1988 Delaware gubernatorial election =

- November 8, 1988
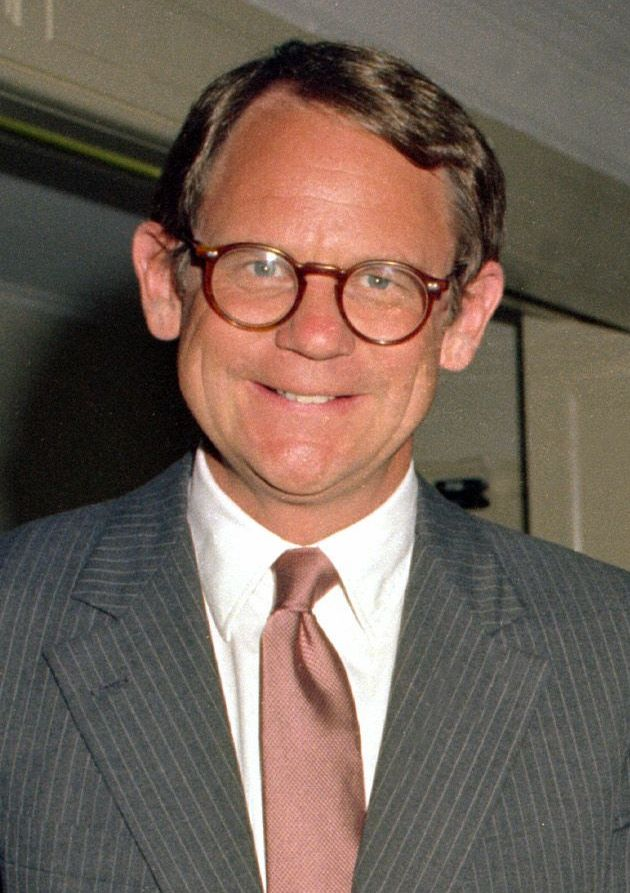

Nominee	Mike Castle	Jacob Kreshtool
Party	Republican	Democratic
Running mate	Dale E. Wolf	Gary E. Hindes
Popular vote	169,733	70,236
Percentage	70.73%	29.27%
- Castle: 50–60% 60–70% 70–80% 80–90% Kreshtool: 60–70%
Governor before election
Mike Castle
Republican
Elected Governor
Mike Castle
Republican

The 1988 Delaware gubernatorial election took place on November 8, 1988. Incumbent Republican governor Mike Castle won re-election to a second term, defeating Democratic nominee labor lawyer Jacob Kreshtool in a landslide. Both were unopposed in their respective primaries. As of 2026, this was the last time a Republican was elected Governor of Delaware.

== General election ==
=== Candidates ===
- Michael Castle (R), incumbent governor
- Jacob Kreshtool (D), labor lawyer

=== Results ===
Delaware gubernatorial election, 1988
Party	Candidate	Votes	%	±%
Republican	Mike Castle (incumbent)	169,733	70.73%	+15.20%
Democratic	Jacob Kreshtool	70,236	29.27%	−15.20%
Majority		99,479	41.46%	+30.40%
Turnout		239,969		
Republican hold		Swing		

==== By county ====
County	Mike Castle Republican		Jacob Kreshtool Democratic	
County	#	%	#	%
Kent	22,563	69.6%	9,874	30.4%
New Castle	115,866	70.0%	49,630	30.0%
Sussex	31,304	74.5%	10,732	25.5%
Totals	169,733	70.7%	70,236	29.3%
