= 2000 United States Senate election in Delaware =

- November 7, 2000
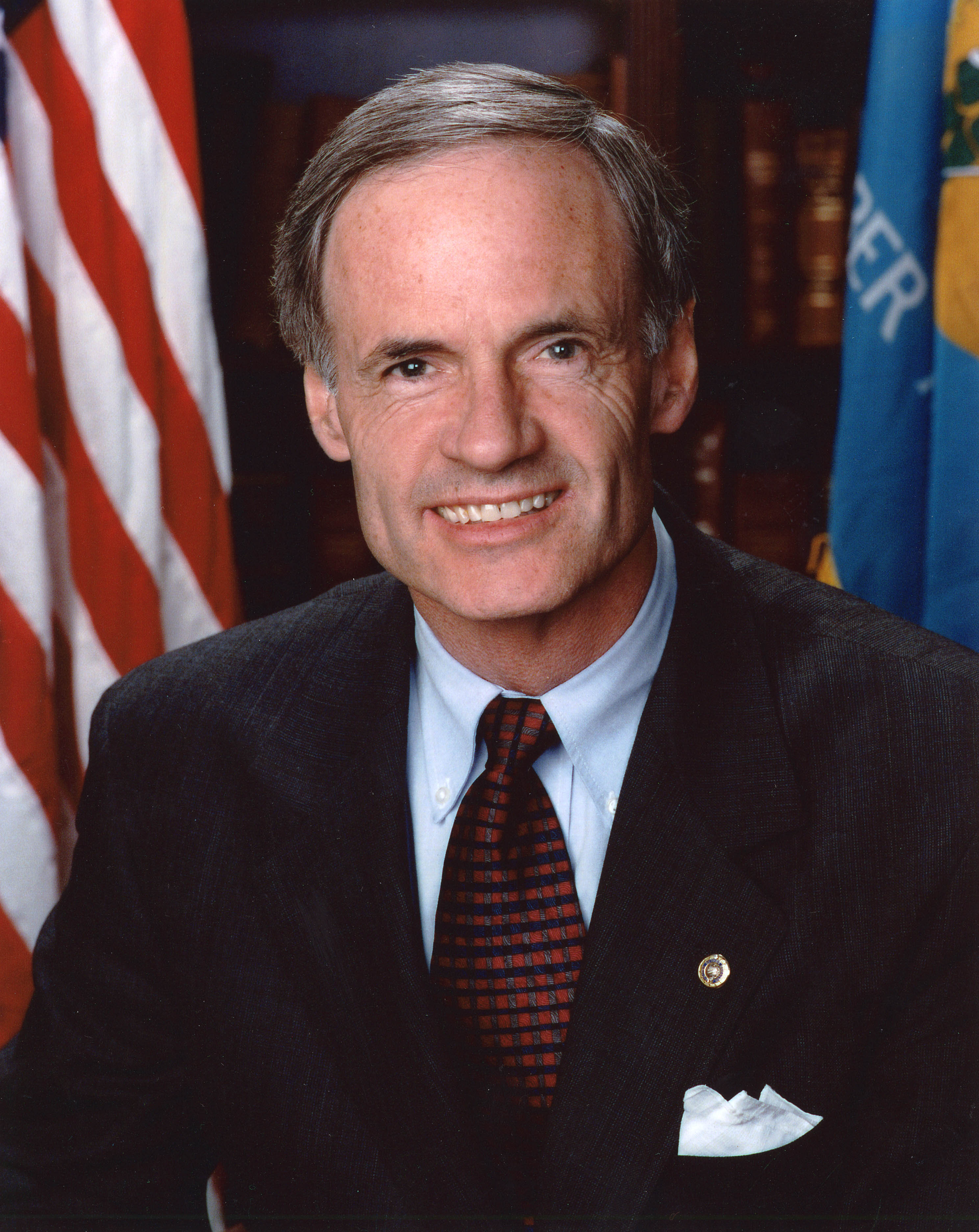

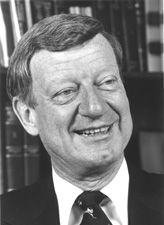
Nominee	Tom Carper	Bill Roth
Party	Democratic	Republican
Popular vote	181,566	142,891
Percentage	55.53%	43.70%
- Carper: 40–50% 50–60% 60–70% 70–80% 80–90% Roth: 40–50% 50–60%
U.S. senator before election
Bill Roth
Republican
Elected U.S. Senator
Tom Carper
Democratic

The 2000 United States Senate election in Delaware was held on November 7, 2000, in conjunction with the 2000 U.S. presidential election, other elections to the United States Senate in other states, as well as elections to the United States House of Representatives, and various state and local elections. Incumbent Republican U.S. senator William Roth ran for re-election to a sixth term, but he was defeated by outgoing Democratic governor Tom Carper.

Carper subsequently became the first Democrat to hold this seat since 1947, when James M. Tunnell left office. It was also the first time since 1943 in which both of the state's Senate seats were held by Democrats, as the class 2 seat was held by Joe Biden. Additionally, it was the only time Carper lost Kent County in his entire political career.

== General election ==
=== Candidates ===
- Tom Carper, Governor of Delaware and former U.S. representative (Democratic)
- Mark E. Dankof (Constitution)
- Robert Mattson (Natural Law)
- J. Burke Morrison (Libertarian)
- William Roth, incumbent U.S. senator since 1971 (Republican)

=== Campaign ===
For 16 years, the same four people had held all four major statewide positions in Delaware. Governor Tom Carper was term-limited and could not run for re-election again. Both he and U.S. representative Mike Castle wanted to be U.S. senator. However, Roth would not retire, and fellow Republican Castle decided against a primary.

Roth, 79, had served in the U.S. Senate for 30 years. He was the chairman of the Finance Committee. Carper, 53, was a popular governor and former U.S. congressman of Delaware's At-large congressional district, who announced his candidacy against Roth in September 1999. Both candidates were moderates. Roth was one of the few Republicans to vote for the Brady Bill. Although Roth started the campaign with a 2-to-1 spending advantage, Carper went into the final month with more than $1 million on hand. In a contest between two popular and respected politicians, the main issue seemed to be Roth's age versus Carper's relative youth.

=== Debates ===
- Complete video of debate, October 15, 2000

=== Results ===
Carper defeated Roth by over ten points. Roth received more votes than presidential candidate George W. Bush, suggesting the strength of the Democratic turnout was a boon to Carper's candidacy. Some attributed Roth's loss to his age and health, as he collapsed twice during the campaign, once in the middle of a television interview and once during a campaign event.

General election results
Party	Candidate	Votes	%	±%
Democratic	Tom Carper	181,566	55.53%	▲13.04
Republican	William Roth (incumbent)	142,891	43.70%	▼12.12
Libertarian	J. Burke Morrison	1,103	0.34%	▼1.36
Constitution	Mark E. Dankof	1,044	0.32%	N/A
Natural Law	Robert Mattson	389	0.12%	N/A
Majority		38,675	11.83%	−1.51%
Turnout		326,993		
Democratic gain from Republican		Swing		

==== By county ====
By county

County	Tom Carper Democratic		William Roth Republican		All Others	
County	#	%	#	%	#	%
Kent	21,998	46.09	25,387	53.19	344	0.72
New Castle	128,491	60.09	83,554	39.07	1,786	0.84
Sussex	31,077	47.49	33,950	51.89	406	0.62
Totals	181,566	55.53	142,891	43.7	2,536	0.78

Counties that flipped from Republican to Democratic

- New Castle (largest city: Wilmington)

== See also ==
- 2000 United States Senate elections
