= 1960 Delaware lieutenant gubernatorial election =

- November 8, 1960
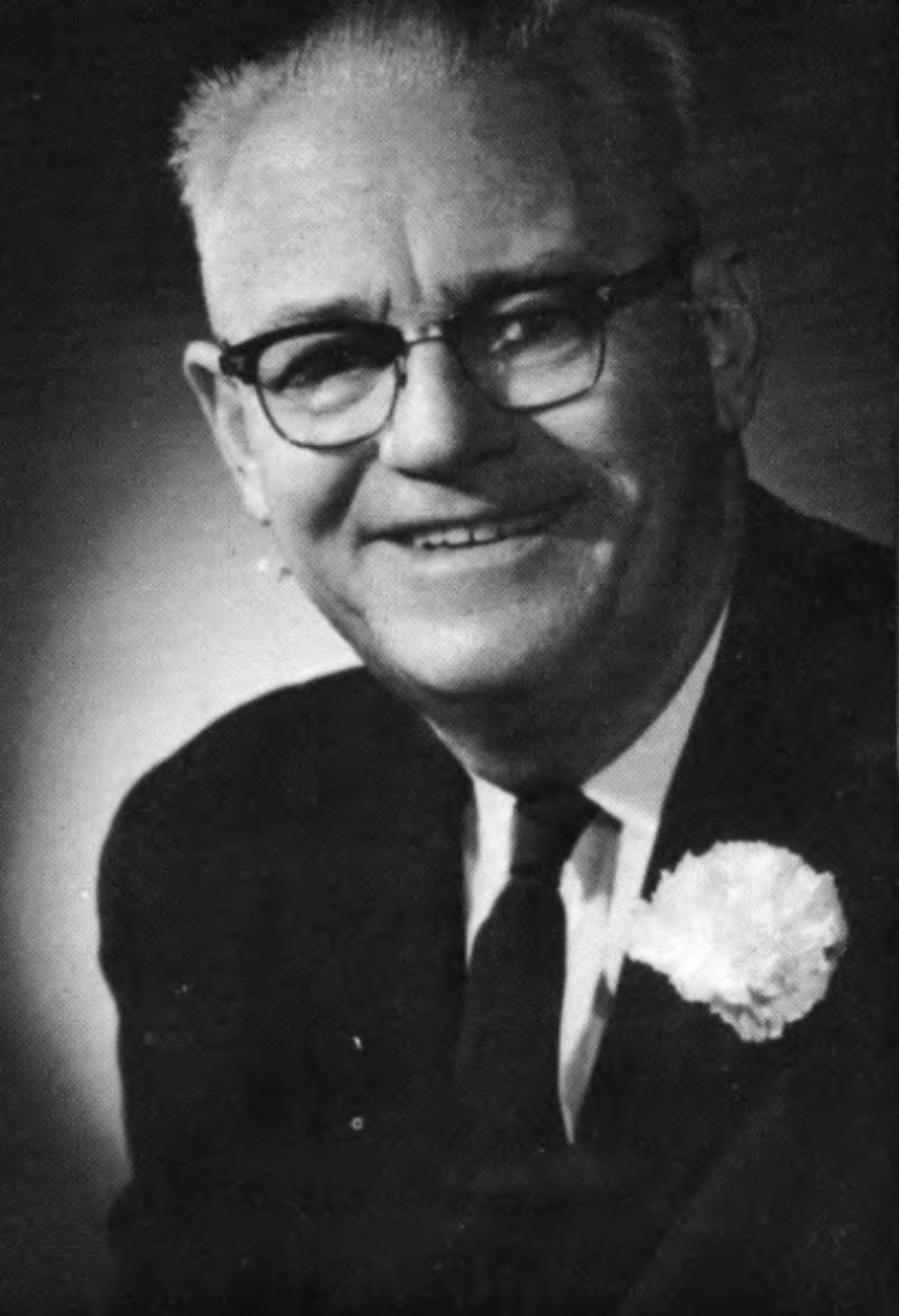

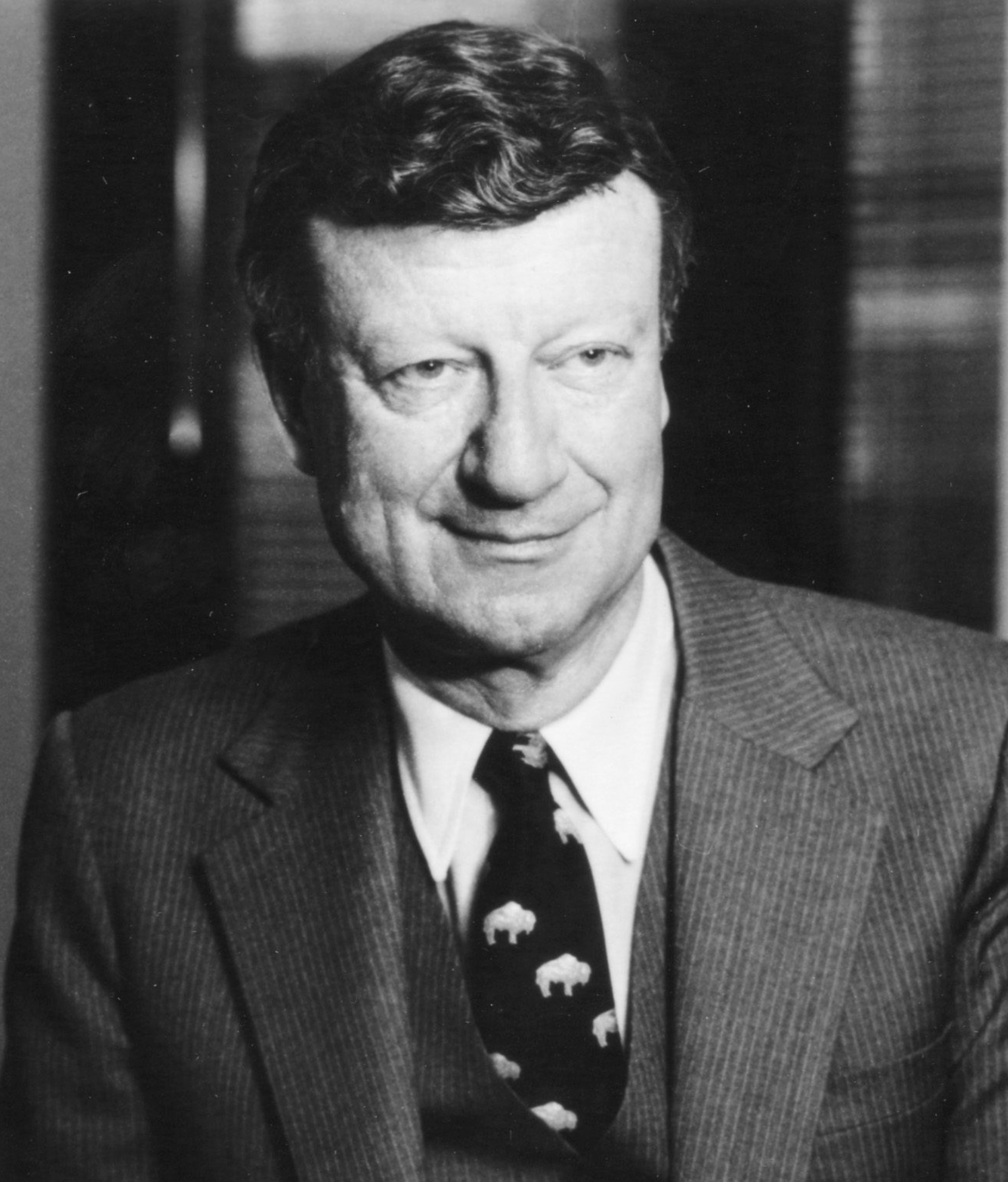
Nominee	Eugene Lammot	William Roth
Party	Democratic	Republican
Popular vote	97,826	96,671
Percentage	50.30%	49.70%
- County results Lammot: 50–60% Roth: 50–60%
Lieutenant Governor before election
David P. Buckson
Republican
Elected Lieutenant Governor
Eugene Lammot
Democratic

The 1960 Delaware lieutenant gubernatorial election was held on November 8, 1960, in order to elect the lieutenant governor of Delaware. Democratic nominee and incumbent mayor of Wilmington Eugene Lammot defeated Republican nominee William Roth.

== General election ==
On election day, November 8, 1960, Democratic nominee Eugene Lammot won the election by a margin of 1,155 votes against his opponent Republican nominee William Roth, thereby gaining Democratic control over the office of lieutenant governor. Lammot was sworn in as the 16th lieutenant governor of Delaware on January 17, 1961.

=== Results ===
Delaware lieutenant gubernatorial election, 1960
Party	Candidate	Votes	%
Democratic	Eugene Lammot	97,826	50.30
Republican	William Roth	96,671	49.70
Total votes		194,497	100.00
Democratic gain from Republican			
