= Governor Wolf =

Governor Wolf may refer to:

- Dale E. Wolf (1924–2021), 70th Governor of Delaware
- George Wolf (1777–1840), 7th Governor of Pennsylvania
- Tom Wolf (born 1948), 47th Governor of Pennsylvania
