= 1988 United States Senate election in Delaware =

- November 8, 1988
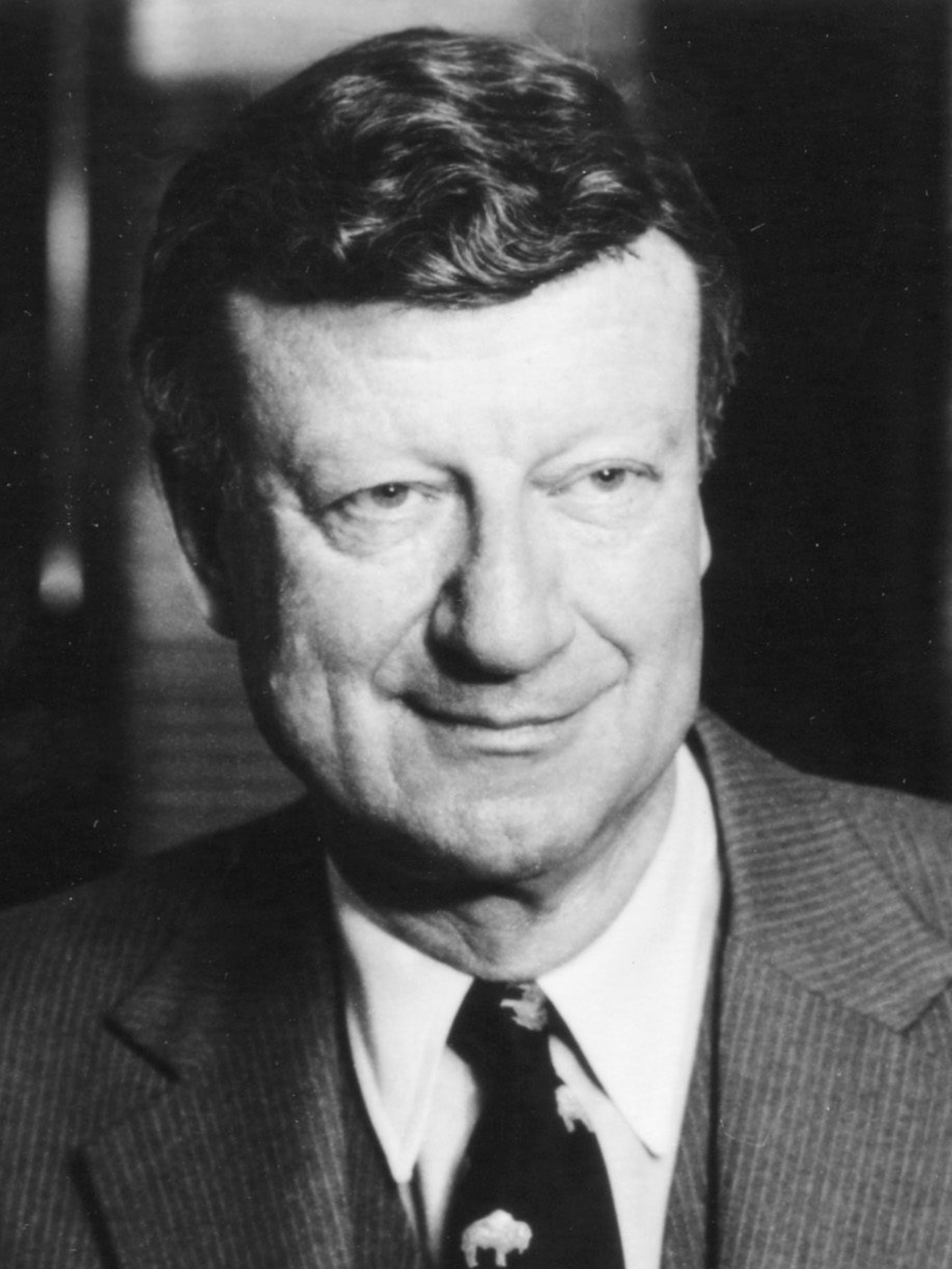

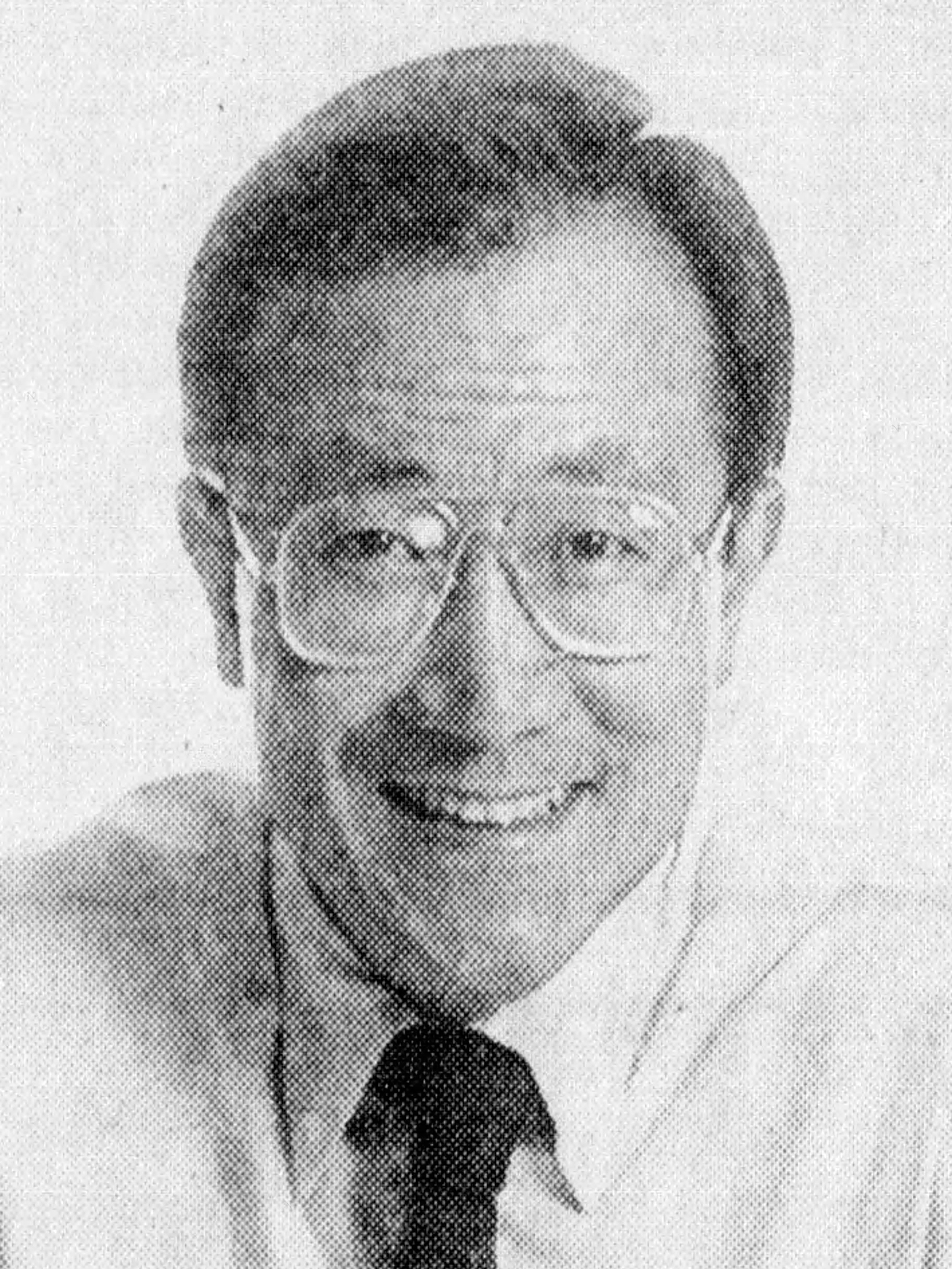
Nominee	Bill Roth	Shien Biau Woo
Party	Republican	Democratic
Popular vote	151,115	92,378
Percentage	62.06%	37.94%
- Roth: 50–60% 60–70% 70–80% Woo: 50–60% 60–70% 80–90%
U.S. senator before election
William V. Roth
Republican
Elected U.S. Senator
William V. Roth
Republican

The 1988 United States Senate election in Delaware was held on November 8, 1988. Incumbent Republican U.S. Senator William Roth won re-election to a fourth term.

== Democratic primary ==
=== Candidates ===
- Shien Biau Woo, Lieutenant Governor of Delaware
- Samuel Beard, investment banker

=== Results ===
Democratic Party primary results
Party	Candidate	Votes	%
Democratic	S. B. Woo	20,225	50.09
Democratic	Samuel Beard	20,154	49.91
Total votes		40,379	100.00

== General election ==
=== Candidates ===
- William V. Roth (R), incumbent U.S. Senator
- Shien Biau Woo (D), Lieutenant Governor of Delaware

=== Results ===
General election results
Party	Candidate	Votes	%	±%
Republican	William V. Roth (Incumbent)	151,115	62.06%	+6.89%
Democratic	S.B. Woo	92,378	37.94%	−6.27%
Majority		58,737	24.12%	+13.15%
Turnout		243,493		
Republican hold		Swing		

== See also ==
- 1988 United States Senate elections
