= 1968 Delaware lieutenant gubernatorial election =

- November 5, 1968
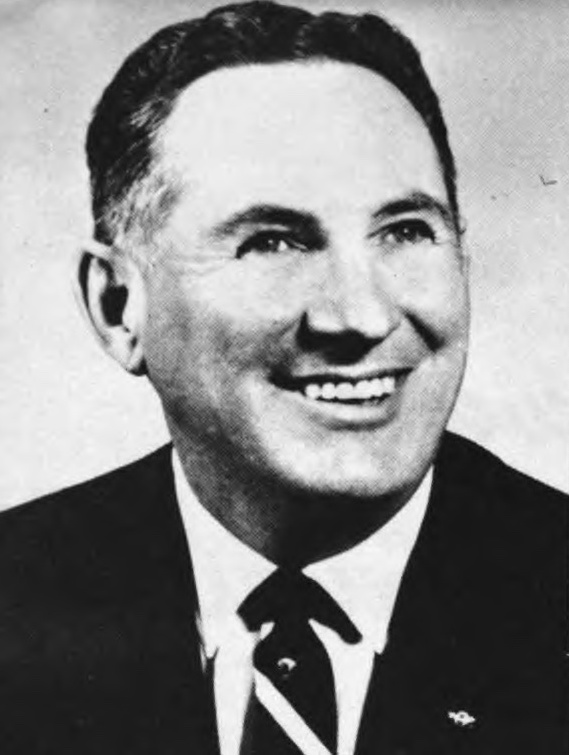

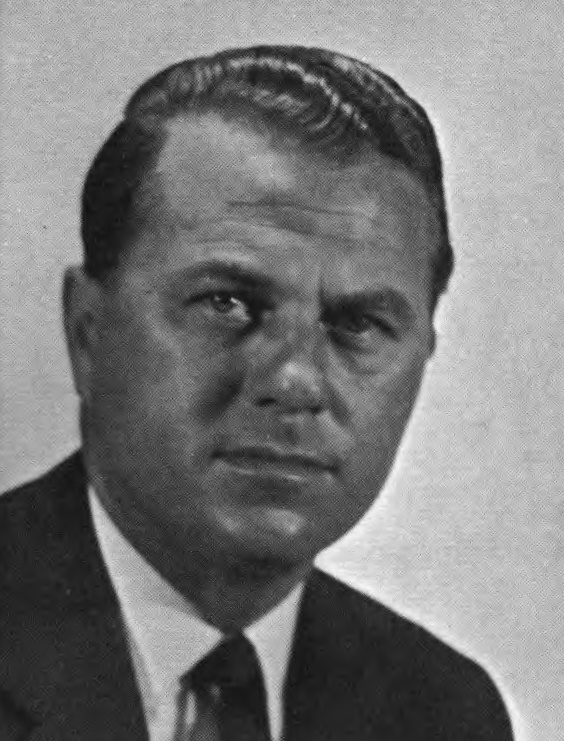
Nominee	Eugene Bookhammer	Sherman W. Tribbitt
Party	Republican	Democratic
Popular vote	101,839	99,421
Percentage	50.60%	49.40%
- County results Bookhammer: 50–60% Tribbitt: 50–60%
Lieutenant Governor before election
Sherman W. Tribbitt
Democratic
Elected Lieutenant Governor
Eugene Bookhammer
Republican

The 1968 Delaware lieutenant gubernatorial election was held on November 5, 1968, in order to elect the lieutenant governor of Delaware. Republican nominee Eugene Bookhammer narrowly defeated Democratic nominee and incumbent lieutenant governor Sherman W. Tribbitt.

== General election ==
On election day, November 5, 1968, Republican nominee Eugene Bookhammer won the election by a margin of 2,418 votes against his opponent Democratic nominee Sherman W. Tribbitt, thereby gaining Republican control over the office of lieutenant governor. Bookhammer was sworn in as the 18th lieutenant governor of Delaware on January 21, 1969.

=== Results ===
Delaware lieutenant gubernatorial election, 1968
Party	Candidate	Votes	%
Republican	Eugene Bookhammer	101,839	50.60
Democratic	Sherman W. Tribbitt (incumbent)	99,421	49.40
Total votes		201,260	100.00
Republican gain from Democratic			
