= 1972 Delaware lieutenant gubernatorial election =

- November 7, 1972
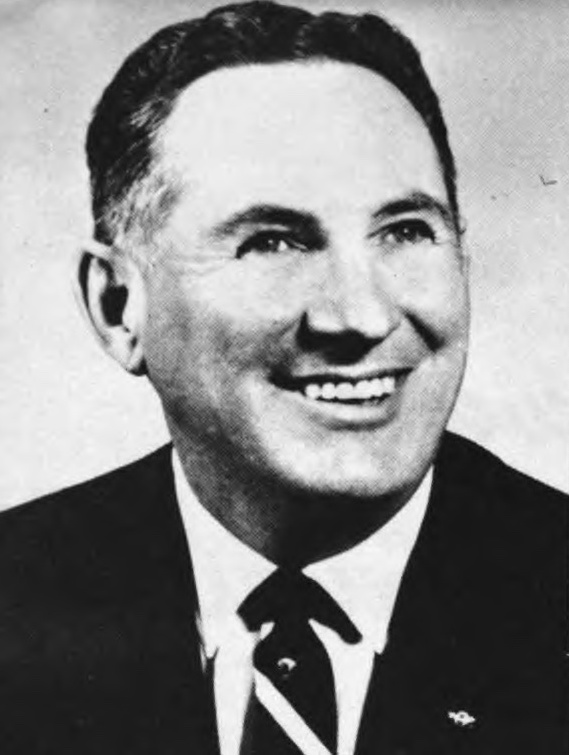

Nominee	Eugene Bookhammer	Clifford B. Hearn
Party	Republican	Democratic
Popular vote	110,087	102,070
Percentage	51.48%	47.73%
- Bookhammer: 50–60% 60–70% 70–80% Heam: 50–60% 60–70% 70–80%
Lieutenant Governor before election
Eugene Bookhammer
Republican
Elected Lieutenant Governor
Eugene Bookhammer
Republican

The 1972 Delaware lieutenant gubernatorial election was held on November 7, 1972, in order to elect the lieutenant governor of Delaware. Republican nominee and incumbent Lieutenant Governor Eugene Bookhammer defeated Democratic nominee Clifford B. Hearn, American nominee William D. Drummond and Prohibition nominee Earl F. Dawson.

== General election ==
On election day, November 7, 1972, Republican nominee Eugene Bookhammer won re-election by a margin of 8,017 votes against his foremost opponent, Democratic nominee Clifford B. Hearn, thereby retaining Republican control over the office of lieutenant governor. Bookhammer was sworn in for his second term on January 16, 1973.

=== Results ===
Delaware lieutenant gubernatorial election, 1972
Party	Candidate	Votes	%
Republican	Eugene Bookhammer (incumbent)	110,087	51.48
Democratic	Clifford B. Hearn	102,070	47.73
American	William D. Drummond	1,389	0.65
Prohibition	Earl F. Dawson	313	0.14
Total votes		213,859	100.00
Republican hold			
