= 1984 Delaware lieutenant gubernatorial election =

- November 6, 1984
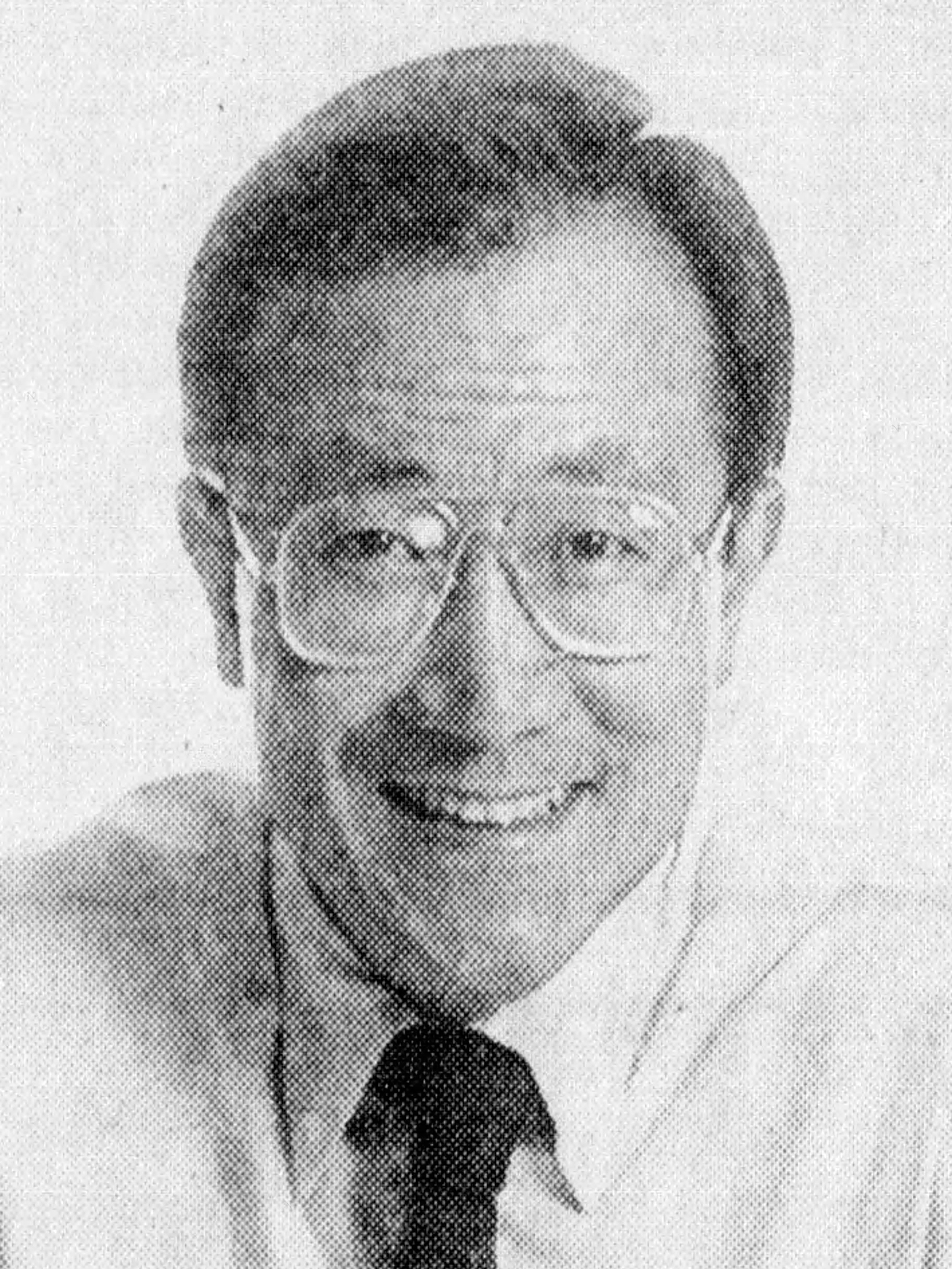

Nominee	S. B. Woo	Battle R. Robinson
Party	Democratic	Republican
Popular vote	121,095	120,666
Percentage	50.09%	49.91%
- Woo: 50–60% 60–70% 70–80% 80–90% Robinson: 50–60% 60–70%
Lieutenant Governor before election
Mike Castle
Republican
Elected Lieutenant Governor
S. B. Woo
Democratic

The 1984 Delaware lieutenant gubernatorial election was held on November 6, 1984, in order to elect the lieutenant governor of Delaware. Democratic nominee S. B. Woo defeated Republican nominee Battle R. Robinson.

== General election ==
On election day, November 6, 1984, Democratic nominee S. B. Woo won the election by a margin of 429 votes against his opponent Republican nominee Battle R. Robinson, thereby gaining Democratic control over the office of lieutenant governor. Woo was sworn in as the 21st lieutenant governor of Delaware on January 15, 1985.

=== Results ===
Delaware lieutenant gubernatorial election, 1984
Party	Candidate	Votes	%
Democratic	S. B. Woo	121,095	50.09
Republican	Battle R. Robinson	120,666	49.91
Total votes		241,761	100.00
Democratic gain from Republican			
