= Thomas Sharp (politician) =

American politician

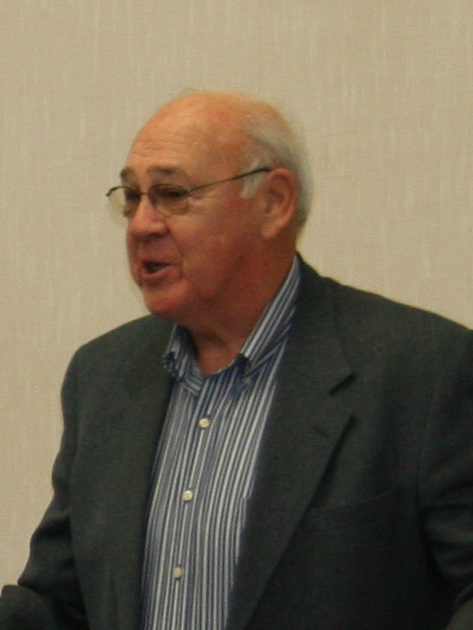
- Sharp in 2012

President pro tempore of the Delaware Senate
- In office 1997–2002
- Preceded by: Richard S. Cordrey
- Succeeded by: Thurman Adams Jr.

Majority leader of the Delaware Senate
- In office 1978–1996

Member of the Delaware Senate from the 20th district
- In office 1974–2002
- Succeeded by: Karen E. Peterson

Personal details
- Born: March 8, 1940 (age 85); Wilmington, Delaware, U.S.
- Political party: Democratic
- Spouse: Judy

Thomas B. Sharp (born March 8, 1940) is an American politician from the state of Delaware. He served in the Delaware State Senate for the 20th district from 1974 to 2002, including as president pro tem from 1997 to 2002 and as majority leader from 1978 to 1996.

== Political career ==
Sharp was the Democratic nominee in the 1980 Delaware lieutenant gubernatorial election, losing to Republican candidate Mike Castle.

=== Delaware State Senate ===
Sharp was first elected to the Delaware State Senate in 1974, then served as Majority Leader from 1978 to 1996 and president pro tem from 1997 to 2002. He did not seek re-election in 2002.

His 1982 campaign was described as "rock-bottom in a campaign for a state Senate seat" by historian Celia Cohen; supporters of both Sharp and his Republican opponent John Czerwinski repeatedly destroyed each candidates' yard signs and Czerwinski's pet rabbit was found dead.

In 1989, Sharp supported bringing back public whipping for criminals charged with drug trafficking.

=== Secretary of the Delaware Department of Labor ===
In 2005, governor Ruth Ann Minner appointed Sharp as secretary of the state Department of Labor, where he served until 2009.
