= 1980 Delaware lieutenant gubernatorial election =

- November 4, 1980
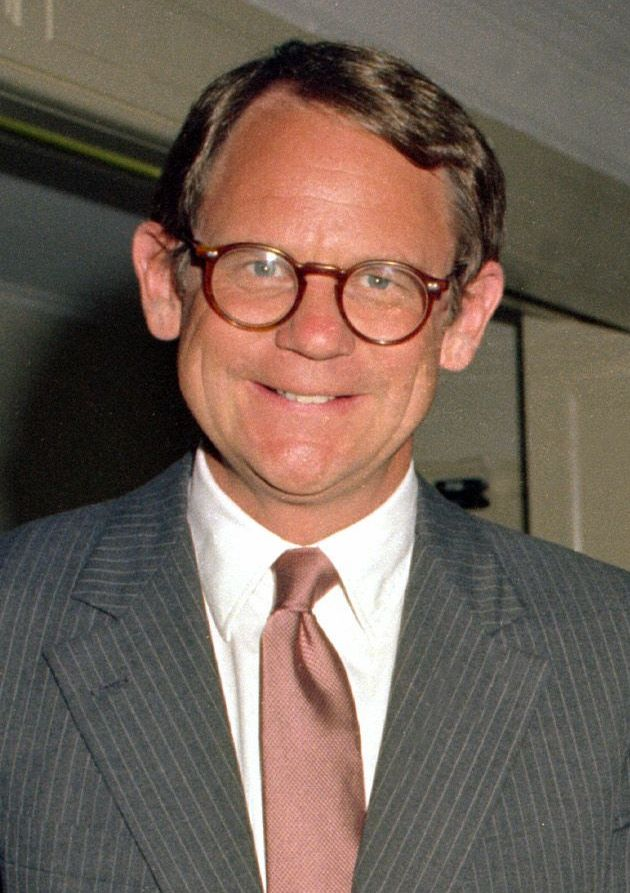

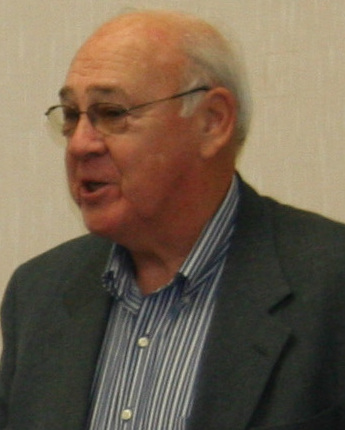
Nominee	Mike Castle	Thomas B. Sharp
Party	Republican	Democratic
Popular vote	128,827	88,224
Percentage	58.72%	40.21%
- Castle: 50–60% 60–70% 70–80% 80–90% Sharp: 40–50% 50–60% 60–70% 70–80%
Lieutenant Governor before election
James D. McGinnis
Democratic
Elected Lieutenant Governor
Mike Castle
Republican

The 1980 Delaware lieutenant gubernatorial election was held on November 4, 1980, in order to elect the lieutenant governor of Delaware. Republican nominee and former member of the Delaware Senate Mike Castle defeated Democratic nominee Thomas B. Sharp, Libertarian nominee Margaret R. Buchanan and American nominee Donald G. Gies.

== General election ==
On election day, November 4, 1980, Republican nominee Mike Castle won the election by a margin of 40,603 votes against his foremost opponent Democratic nominee Thomas B. Sharp, thereby gaining Republican control over the office of lieutenant governor. Castle was sworn in as the 20th lieutenant governor of Delaware on January 20, 1981.

=== Results ===
Delaware lieutenant gubernatorial election, 1980
Party	Candidate	Votes	%
Republican	Mike Castle	128,827	58.72
Democratic	Thomas B. Sharp	88,224	40.21
Libertarian	Margaret R. Buchanan	1,654	0.75
American	Donald G. Gies	687	0.32
Total votes		219,392	100.00
Republican gain from Democratic			
