= 1970 United States Senate election in Delaware =

- November 2, 1970
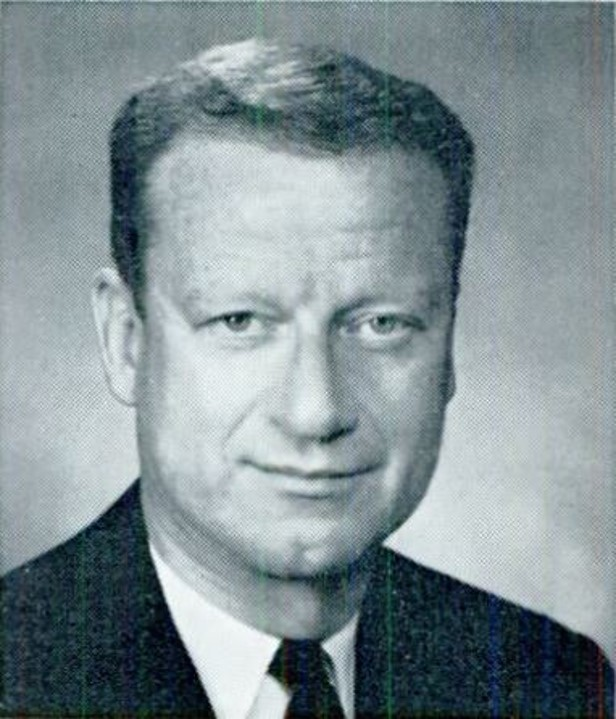

Nominee	Bill Roth	Jacob W. Zimmerman
Party	Republican	Democratic
Popular vote	94,979	64,740
Percentage	58.83%	40.10%
- Roth: 50–60% 60–70% 70–80% Zimmerman: 50–60% 60–70%
U.S. senator before election
John J. Williams
Republican
Elected U.S. Senator
William Roth
Republican

The 1970 United States Senate election in Delaware took place on November 2, 1970. Incumbent Republican U.S. Senator John J. Williams retired. Republican Party U.S. Representative Bill Roth was elected to succeed him.

== General election ==
=== Candidates ===
- Donald G. Gies, Air Force veteran (American)
- William Roth, U.S. Representative from Wilmington (Republican)
- Jacob W. Zimmerman, potato farmer (Democratic)

=== Results ===
General election results
Party	Candidate	Votes	%	±%
Republican	William Roth	94,979	58.83%	▲7.12
Democratic	Jacob W. Zimmerman	64,740	40.10%	▼8.16
American	Donald G. Gies	1,720	1.07%	N/A
Total votes		161,439	100.00%	
Republican hold				

== See also ==
- 1970 United States Senate elections
