= William Roth =

American politician (1921–2003)

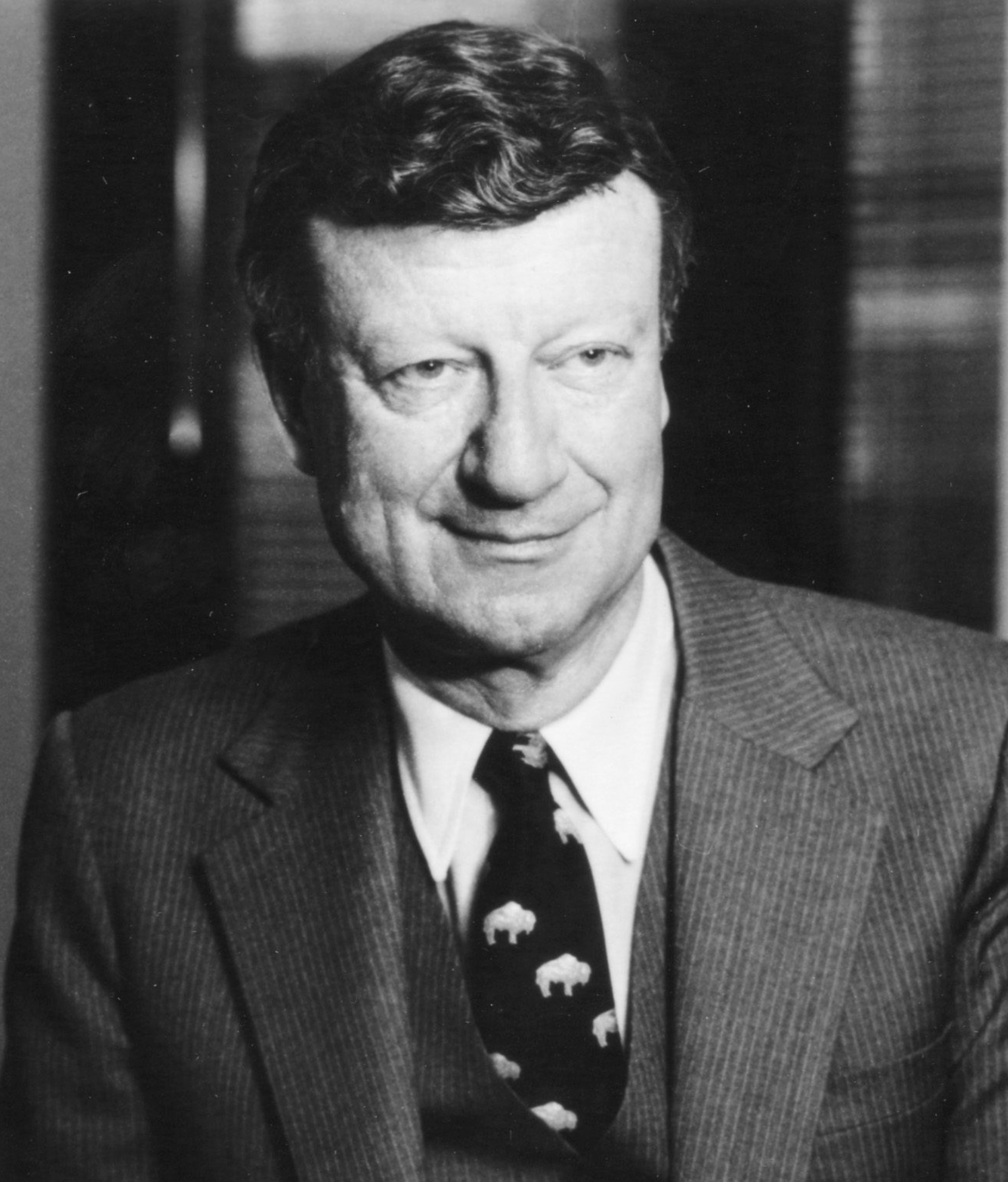
- Official portrait, c. 1971

United States Senator from Delaware
- In office January 1, 1971 – January 3, 2001
- Preceded by: John J. Williams
- Succeeded by: Tom Carper
Committee positions
Chair of the Senate Finance Committee
In office October 1, 1995 – January 3, 2001
Preceded by	Bob Packwood
Succeeded by	Max Baucus
Chair of the Senate Governmental Affairs Committee
In office January 3, 1995 – October 1, 1995
Preceded by	John Glenn
Succeeded by	Ted Stevens
In office January 3, 1981 – January 3, 1987
Preceded by	Abraham Ribicoff
Succeeded by	John Glenn
Ranking Member of the Senate Governmental Affairs Committee
In office January 3, 1987 – January 3, 1995
Preceded by	Thomas Eagleton
Succeeded by	John Glenn

Member of the U.S. House of Representatives from Delaware's at-large district
- In office January 3, 1967 – December 31, 1970
- Preceded by: Harris McDowell
- Succeeded by: Pete du Pont

Chair of the Delaware Republican Party
- In office April 10, 1961 – May 13, 1964
- Preceded by: Ellwood S. Leach
- Succeeded by: Clayton S. Harrison Jr.

Personal details
- Born: William Victor Roth Jr. July 22, 1921 Great Falls, Montana, U.S.
- Died: December 13, 2003 (aged 82) Washington, D.C., U.S.
- Party: Republican
- Spouse: Jane Richards (m. 1965)
- Children: 2
- Education: University of Oregon (BA); Harvard University (MBA, LLB)

Military service
- Branch/service: United States Army
- Years of service: 1943–1946
- Unit: Intelligence
- Battles/wars: World War II
- William Roth's voice Roth congratulates Joe Biden on his recovery from a brain aneurysm Recorded September 7, 1988

William Victor Roth Jr. (July 22, 1921 – December 13, 2003) was an American lawyer and politician from Wilmington, Delaware. He was a veteran of World War II and a member of the Republican Party. He served from 1967 to 1970 as the lone U.S. representative from Delaware and from 1971 to 2001 as a U.S. senator from Delaware. He is the last Republican to serve as and/or be elected a U.S. senator from Delaware.

Roth was a sponsor of legislation creating the Roth IRA, an individual retirement plan that can be set up with post-tax dollars, offering tax-free withdrawals.

== Early life and family ==
Roth was born in Great Falls, Montana, the son of Clara (née Nelson) and William Victor Roth, who ran a brewery. His paternal grandparents were German and his maternal grandparents were Swedish. He attended public schools in Helena, Montana, graduating from Helena High School. Roth started college at Montana State University before moving on to graduate from the University of Oregon in 1943, Harvard Business School in 1947, and Harvard Law School in 1949. During World War II he served in a United States Army intelligence unit from 1943 until 1946.

After being admitted to the California Bar in 1950, he moved permanently to Delaware in 1954, and began his work as an attorney for the Hercules Corporation. He married Jane Richards in 1965, and they had two children, William III and Katharine. Jane Richards Roth was U.S. District Court judge for the District of Delaware from 1985 until 1991, and then a judge of the U.S. Court of Appeals for the Third Circuit. They were members of the Episcopal Church.

Roth became active in politics as a Republican, and served as secretary of the Delaware Republican Party and a vice president of the Active Young Republicans of New Castle County. In addition, he served as a member of Delaware's "Little Hoover Commission", which studied state government and made recommendations for modernizing and reforming it.

== Professional and political career ==
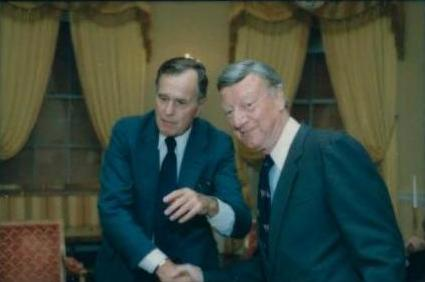
Roth with President George H. W. Bush in 1990

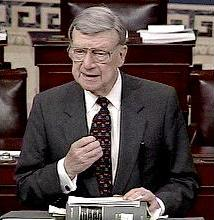
Roth speaking on the floor of the Senate, c. 2000

After losing the election for lieutenant governor of Delaware in 1960, Roth was named chair of the Delaware Republican Party on April 10, 1961. He replaced incumbent Ellwood S. Leach. He served until May 13, 1964, when he lost his reelection bid to Clayton S. Harrison Jr. by a 32–24 vote. In 1966, he defeated incumbent U.S. Representative Harris McDowell, and went on to serve two terms in the United States House of Representatives from January 3, 1967, until December 31, 1970. Roth voted in favor of the Civil Rights Act of 1968.

He then began his five terms in the United States Senate, succeeding the retiring incumbent senator John J. Williams. He served in the U.S. Senate from January 1, 1971, having been appointed when Williams left office two days early, until January 3, 2001, having been defeated in the 2000 election by the Democratic candidate, Governor Tom Carper. Many consider Roth's defeat due to his age and health, as he collapsed twice during the campaign, once in the middle of a television interview and once during a campaign event.

Roth was known for fiscal conservatism. Critics blamed him for national deficits during the presidency of Ronald Reagan. He was a longtime member of the Senate Committee on Governmental Affairs and the Senate Committee on Finance, serving as chairman from September 12, 1995, through January 3, 2001. He was best remembered as a strong advocate of tax cuts, and he co-authored the Economic Recovery Tax Act of 1981, also known as the Kemp-Roth Tax Cut with Jack Kemp. Roth was also the legislative sponsor of the individual retirement account plan that bears his name, the Roth IRA. It is a popular individual retirement account that has existed since 1998. The Roth 401(k), which did not become available until 2006, is also named after Roth. He was also one of the few Republicans to vote for the Brady Bill and the ban on semi-automatic weapons. Roth strongly supported environmental protections. Roth was also very engaged in international affairs and policy. He served as the president of NATO's parliament, the North Atlantic Assembly, from 1996 to 1998.

In 1977, Roth was one of nine senators to vote against the Senate adopting a stringent code of ethics intended to assist with the restoration of public confidence in Congress.

On December 2, 1981, Roth was one of four senators to vote against an amendment to President Reagan's MX missiles proposal that would divert the silo system by $334 million as well as earmark further research for other methods that would allow giant missiles to be based. The vote was seen as a rebuff of the Reagan administration.

Roth voted in favor of the bill establishing Martin Luther King Jr. Day as a federal holiday and the Civil Rights Restoration Act of 1987 (as well to override President Reagan's veto). Roth also voted in favor of the nominations of Robert Bork and Clarence Thomas to the U.S. Supreme Court.

During the 1999 impeachment of Bill Clinton Roth voted to convict the President on both charges of impeachment. However, Clinton was acquitted on both charges.

"Roth was not a natural campaigner and would ease himself into public appearances by bringing along a Saint Bernard dog. His succession of St. Bernards through his 34-year political career became a trademark of sorts".

== Death ==
On December 12, 2003, Roth fell ill while visiting his daughter in Washington, and was admitted to George Washington University Hospital, where he died from heart failure the following day. The Chesapeake & Delaware Canal Bridge carrying Delaware Route 1 was dedicated as the Senator William V. Roth Jr. Bridge, and a celebration was held on July 9, 2007. The bridge is a cable-stayed bridge and notable landmark in northern Delaware. Roth helped secure its funding.

== Electoral history ==
Public offices
Office	Type	Location	Began office	Ended office	Notes
U.S. Representative	Legislature	Washington	January 3, 1967	January 3, 1969	
U.S. Representative	Legislature	Washington	January 3, 1969	December 31, 1970	
U.S. Senator	Legislature	Washington	January 1, 1971	January 3, 1977	
U.S. Senator	Legislature	Washington	January 3, 1977	January 3, 1983	
U.S. Senator	Legislature	Washington	January 3, 1983	January 3, 1989	
U.S. Senator	Legislature	Washington	January 3, 1989	January 3, 1995	
U.S. Senator	Legislature	Washington	January 3, 1995	January 3, 2001	

United States Congressional service
Dates	Congress	Chamber	Majority	President	Committees	Class/district
1967–1969	90th	U.S. House	Democratic	Lyndon B. Johnson		at-large
1969–1971	91st	U.S. House	Democratic	Richard Nixon		at-large
1971–1973	92nd	U.S. Senate	Democratic	Richard Nixon	Governmental Affairs; Finance	class 1
1973–1975	93rd	U.S. Senate	Democratic	Richard Nixon; Gerald R. Ford	Governmental Affairs; Finance	class 1
1975–1977	94th	U.S. Senate	Democratic	Gerald Ford	Governmental Affairs; Finance	class 1
1977–1979	95th	U.S. Senate	Democratic	Jimmy Carter	Governmental Affairs; Finance	class 1
1979–1981	96th	U.S. Senate	Democratic	Jimmy Carter	Governmental Affairs; Finance	class 1
1981–1983	97th	U.S. Senate	Republican	Ronald Reagan	Governmental Affairs, Chair; Finance	class 1
1983–1985	98th	U.S. Senate	Republican	Ronald Reagan	Governmental Affairs, Chair; Finance	class 1
1985–1987	99th	U.S. Senate	Republican	Ronald Reagan	Governmental Affairs, Chair; Finance	class 1
1987–1989	100th	U.S. Senate	Democratic	Ronald Reagan	Governmental Affairs; Finance	class 1
1989–1991	101st	U.S. Senate	Democratic	George H. W. Bush	Governmental Affairs; Finance	class 1
1991–1993	102nd	U.S. Senate	Democratic	George H. W. Bush	Governmental Affairs; Finance	class 1
1993–1995	103rd	U.S. Senate	Democratic	Bill Clinton	Governmental Affairs; Finance	class 1
1995–1997	104th	U.S. Senate	Republican	Bill Clinton	Governmental Affairs, Chair; Finance, Chair	class 1
1997–1999	105th	U.S. Senate	Republican	Bill Clinton	Governmental Affairs, Chair; Finance, Chair	class 1
1999–2001	106th	U.S. Senate	Republican	Bill Clinton	Governmental Affairs, Chair; Finance, Chair	class 1

Election results
Year	Office	Election	Republican	Votes	%	Democrat	Votes	%
1960	Lt. Governor	General	William V. Roth Jr.	96,671	50%	Eugene Lammot	97,826	50%
1966	U.S. Representative	General	William V. Roth Jr.	90,961	56%	Harris B. McDowell Jr.	72,142	44%
1968	U.S. Representative	General	William V. Roth Jr.	117,827	59%	Harris B. McDowell Jr.	82,993	41%
1970	U.S. Senator	General	William V. Roth Jr.	94,979	59%	Jacob W. Zimmerman	64,740	40%
1976	U.S. Senator	General	William V. Roth Jr.	125,454	56%	Thomas C. Maloney	98,042	44%
1982	U.S. Senator	General	William V. Roth Jr.	105,357	55%	David N. Levinson	84,413	44%
1988	U.S. Senator	General	William V. Roth Jr.	151,115	62%	Shien Biau Woo	92,378	38%
1994	U.S. Senator	General	William V. Roth Jr.	111,074	56%	Charles M. Oberly III	84,540	42%
2000	U.S. Senator	General	William V. Roth Jr.	142,891	44%	Thomas R. Carper	181,566	56%

== Works ==
- Roth, William V. Jr.; Nixon, William H. (1999). The Power to Destroy: How the IRS Became America. Atlantic Monthly Press. ISBN 0-87113-748-8.

Party political offices
Preceded by David P. Buckson	Republican nominee for Lieutenant Governor of Delaware; 1960	Succeeded by William T. Best
Preceded by Ellwood S. Leach	Chair of the Delaware Republican Party; 1961–1964	Succeeded by Clayton S. Harrison Jr.
Preceded by John J. Williams	Republican nominee for U.S. Senator from Delaware (Class 1); 1970, 1976, 1982, 1988, 1994, 2000	Succeeded by Jan Ting
U.S. House of Representatives
Preceded by Harris McDowell	Member of the U.S. House of Representatives from Delaware's at-large congressional district 1967–1970	Succeeded by Pete du Pont
U.S. Senate
Preceded by John J. Williams	U.S. senator (Class 1) from Delaware; 1971–2001; Served alongside: J. Caleb Boggs, Joe Biden	Succeeded by Tom Carper
Preceded by Abraham Ribicoff	Chair of the Senate Governmental Affairs Committee; 1981–1987	Succeeded by John Glenn
Preceded by Thomas Eagleton	Ranking Member of the Senate Governmental Affairs Committee; 1987–1995	Succeeded by John Glenn
Preceded by John Glenn	Chair of the Senate Governmental Affairs Committee; 1995	Succeeded by Ted Stevens
Preceded by Bob Packwood	Chair of the Senate Finance Committee; 1995–2001	Succeeded by Max Baucus
