= 1976 United States Senate election in Delaware =

- November 2, 1976
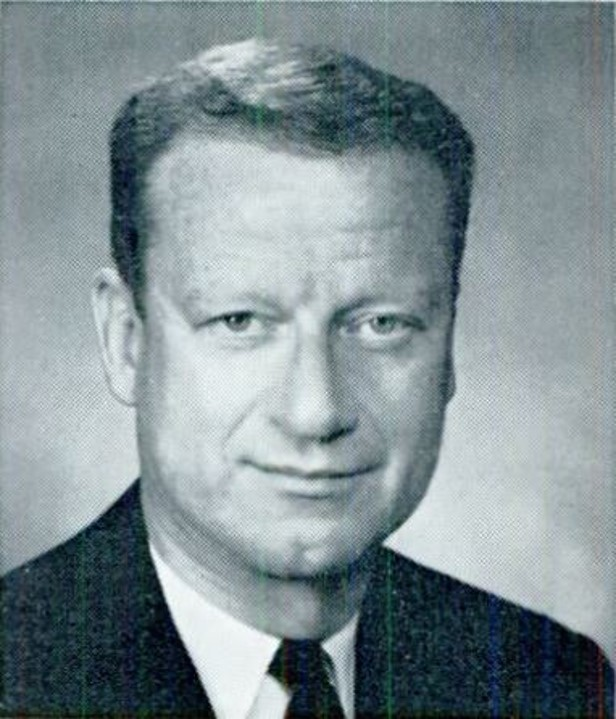

Nominee	Bill Roth	Thomas Maloney
Party	Republican	Democratic
Popular vote	125,454	98,042
Percentage	55.81%	43.61%
- Roth: 50–60% 60–70% 70–80% Maloney: 50–60% 60–70%
U.S. senator before election
Bill Roth
Republican
Elected U.S. Senator
Bill Roth
Republican

The 1976 United States Senate election in Delaware took place on November 2, 1976. Incumbent Republican U.S. Senator Bill Roth won reelection to a second term.

== Candidates ==
- Donald G. Gies (American), engineer, perennial candidate and officer in the US Air Force Reserve
- Thomas Maloney (Democratic), mayor of Wilmington
- John A. Massimilla (Prohibition)
- Joseph F. McInerney (Non-Partisan)
- Bil Roth (Republican), incumbent U.S. senator

== Results ==
General election results
Party	Candidate	Votes	%
Republican	William Roth (incumbent)	125,454	55.81%
Democratic	Thomas Maloney	98,042	43.61%
American	Donald G. Gies	646	0.29%
Non-Partisan	Joseph F. McInerney	437	0.19%
Prohibition	John A. Massimilla	216	0.1%
Majority		27,412	12.20%
Turnout		224,795	
Republican hold			

=== County results ===
County	William Victor Roth Jr. Republican	Thomas Maloney Democratic	Donald G. Giles American	Joseph F. McInerney Non-Partisan	John A. Massimilla Prohibition	Total
Kent	13,481	14,359	86	44	42	28,012
New Castle	93,267	68,610	486	323	142	162,828
Sussex	18,754	15,086	74	73	32	34,019
Total	125,502	98,055	646	440	216	224,859

== See also ==
- 1976 United States Senate elections
