= 1952 Delaware lieutenant gubernatorial election =

- November 4, 1952
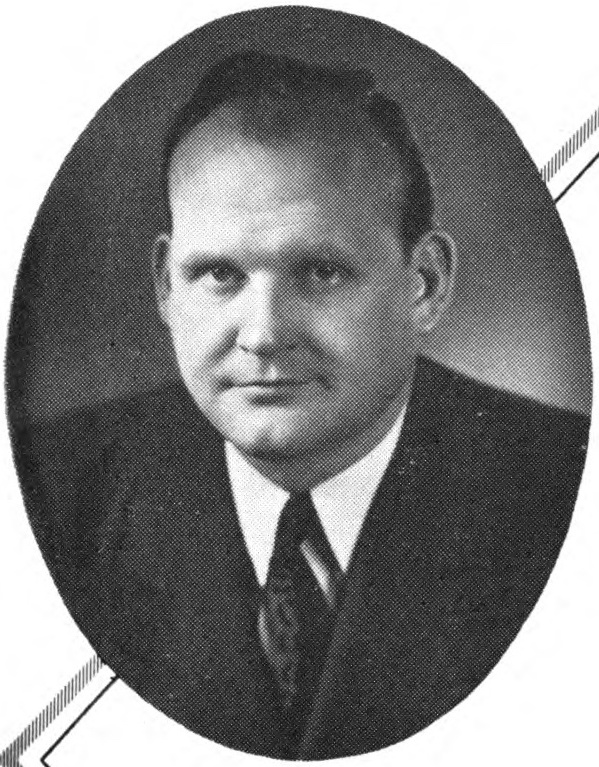

Nominee	John W. Rollins	Vernon B. Derrickson
Party	Republican	Democratic
Popular vote	86,622	83,300
Percentage	50.98%	49.02%
- County results Rollins: 50–60% Derrickson: 50–60%
Lieutenant Governor before election
Alexis I. du Pont Bayard
Democratic
Elected Lieutenant Governor
John W. Rollins
Republican

The 1952 Delaware lieutenant gubernatorial election was held on November 4, 1952, in order to elect the lieutenant governor of Delaware. Republican nominee John W. Rollins defeated Democratic nominee Vernon B. Derrickson.

== General election ==
On election day, November 4, 1952, Republican nominee John W. Rollins won the election by a margin of 3,322 votes against his opponent Democratic nominee Vernon B. Derrickson, thereby gaining Republican control over the office of lieutenant governor. Rollins was sworn in as the 14th lieutenant governor of Delaware on January 20, 1953.

=== Results ===
Delaware lieutenant gubernatorial election, 1952
Party	Candidate	Votes	%
Republican	John W. Rollins	86,622	50.98
Democratic	Vernon B. Derrickson	83,300	49.02
Total votes		169,922	100.00
Republican gain from Democratic			
