= 1956 Delaware lieutenant gubernatorial election =

- November 6, 1956
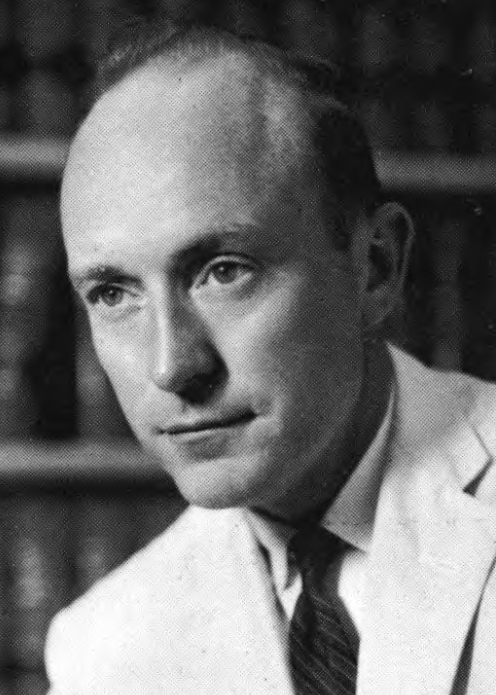

Nominee	David P. Buckson	Vernon B. Derrickson
Party	Republican	Democratic
Popular vote	92,254	81,121
Percentage	53.21%	46.79%
- County results Buckson: 50–60% Derrickson: 50–60%
Lieutenant Governor before election
John W. Rollins
Republican
Elected Lieutenant Governor
David P. Buckson
Republican

The 1956 Delaware lieutenant gubernatorial election was held on November 6, 1956, in order to elect the lieutenant governor of Delaware. Republican nominee David P. Buckson defeated Democratic nominee Vernon B. Derrickson.

== General election ==
On election day, November 6, 1956, Republican nominee David P. Buckson won the election by a margin of 11,133 votes against his opponent Democratic nominee Vernon B. Derrickson, thereby retaining Republican control over the office of lieutenant governor. Buckson was sworn in as the 15th lieutenant governor of Delaware on January 15, 1957.

=== Results ===
Delaware lieutenant gubernatorial election, 1956
Party	Candidate	Votes	%
Republican	David P. Buckson	92,254	53.21
Democratic	Vernon B. Derrickson	81,121	46.79
Total votes		173,375	100.00
Republican hold			
