= 1944 Delaware lieutenant gubernatorial election =

- November 7, 1944
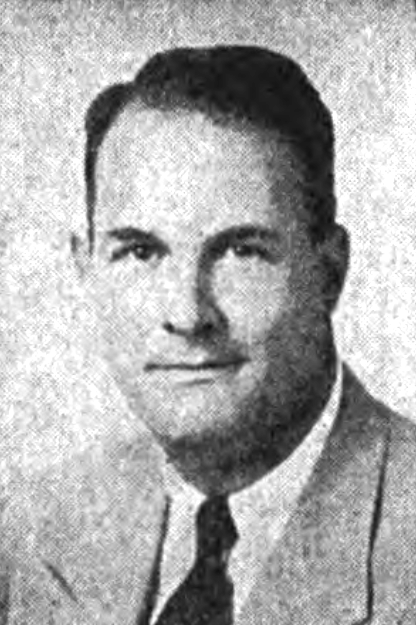

Nominee	Elbert N. Carvel	Clayton A. Bunting
Party	Democratic	Republican
Popular vote	62,797	62,344
Percentage	50.05%	49.68%
- County results Carvel: 50–60% Bunting: 50–60%
Lieutenant Governor before election
Isaac J. MacCollum
Democratic
Elected Lieutenant Governor
Elbert N. Carvel
Democratic

The 1944 Delaware lieutenant gubernatorial election was held on November 7, 1944, in order to elect the lieutenant governor of Delaware. Democratic nominee Elbert N. Carvel defeated Republican nominee Clayton A. Bunting and Prohibition nominee J. Olan Jones.

== General election ==
On election day, November 7, 1944, Democratic nominee Elbert N. Carvel won the election by a margin of 453 votes against his foremost opponent Republican nominee Clayton A. Bunting, thereby retaining Democratic control over the office of lieutenant governor. Carvel was sworn in as the 12th lieutenant governor of Delaware on January 18, 1945.

=== Results ===
Delaware lieutenant gubernatorial election, 1944
Party	Candidate	Votes	%
Democratic	Elbert N. Carvel	62,797	50.05
Republican	Clayton A. Bunting	62,344	49.68
Prohibition	J. Olan Jones	339	0.27
Total votes		125,480	100.00
Democratic hold			
