= S. B. Woo =

Lieutenant Governor of Delaware

- 吳仙標
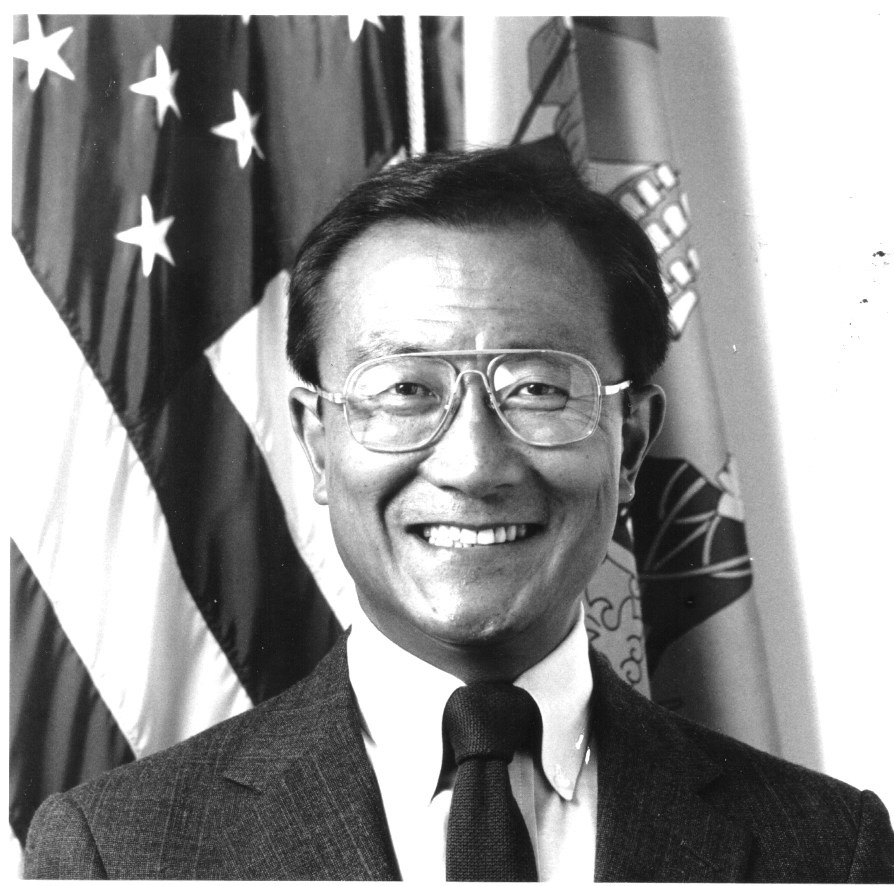

21st Lieutenant Governor of Delaware
- In office January 15, 1985 – January 20, 1989
- Governor: Mike Castle
- Preceded by: Mike Castle
- Succeeded by: Dale E. Wolf

Personal details
- Born: Shien Biau Woo; August 13, 1937 (age 89) Shanghai, China
- Party: Democratic
- Spouse: Katy
- Education: Georgetown College (BS); Washington University (MS, PhD)

Chinese name
- Traditional Chinese: 吳仙標
- Simplified Chinese: 吴仙标
- Hanyu Pinyin: Wú Xiānbiāo

Shien Biau Woo (born August 13, 1937) is a Chinese American professor and politician from Newark, Delaware. A member of the Democratic Party, he served as the 21st lieutenant governor of Delaware.

== Early life and family ==
Woo's ancestral hometown is Yuyao, Zhejiang Province. He was born in 1937 in Shanghai. His parents fled the Chinese Communist Revolution in 1949 to Hong Kong with him. He studied at Hong Kong Pui Ching Middle School and came to the United States at age 18. He received undergraduate degrees in mathematics and physics from Georgetown College in Kentucky and his PhD in physics from Washington University in St. Louis in 1964.

He married Katy Wu in 1963 and has two children. In 1966, he joined the faculty of the University of Delaware, where he became a professor of physics and astronomy. He retired in 2002 after 36 years.

== Political career ==
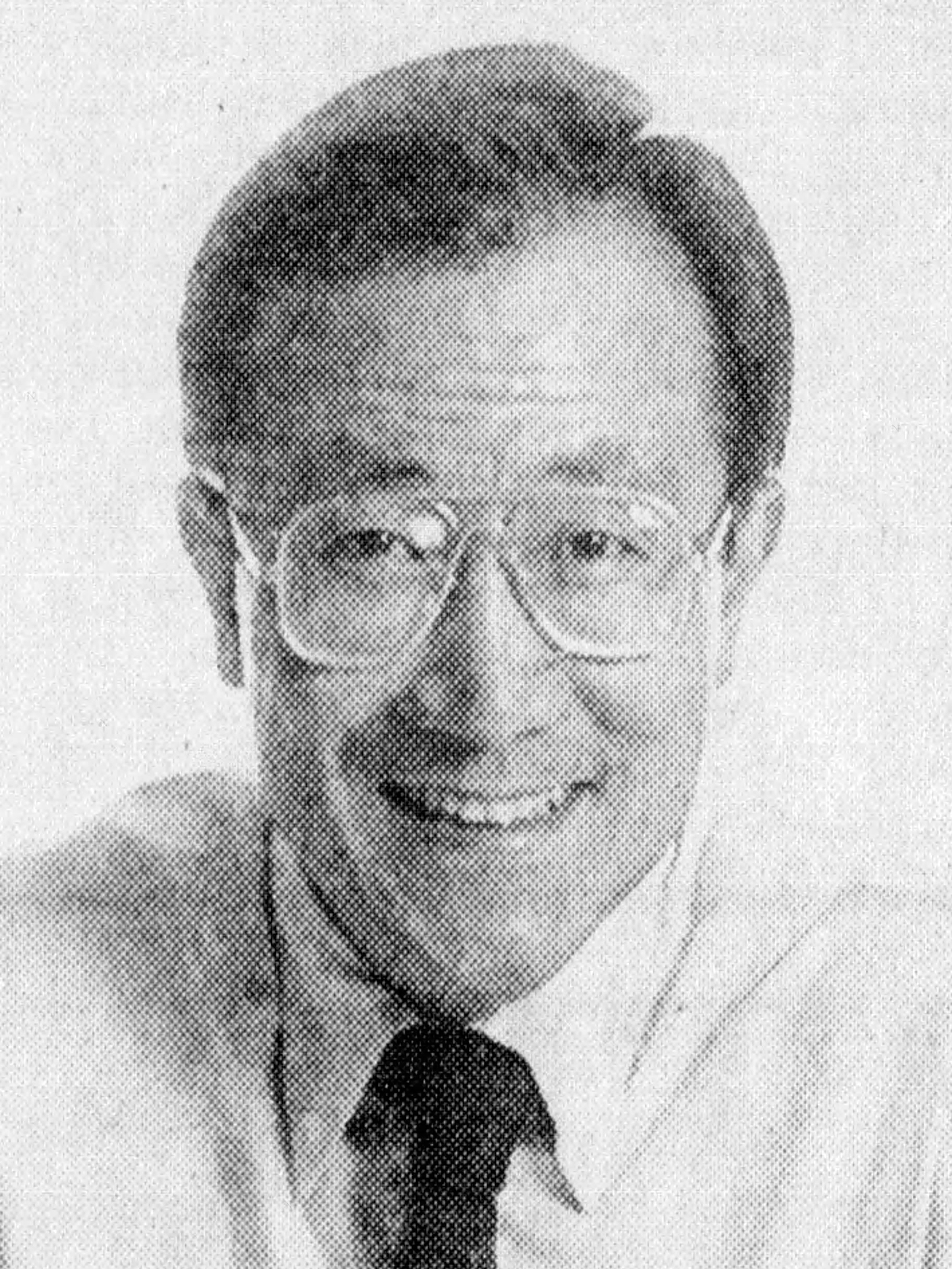
Woo in 1984.

In his first attempt at public office, Woo was elected lieutenant governor in 1984. He won the Democratic primary election, defeating two veteran state senators, Nancy W. Cook of Dover and David McBride of New Castle. In the general election, he defeated Republican nominee Battle R. Robinson of Georgetown, the first woman to practice law in Sussex County and the assistant legal counsel to retiring Governor Pete du Pont, by just 429 votes. Woo thus became one of the nation's highest-ranking Chinese American public officeholders. He served from January 15, 1985, to January 20, 1989.

Woo narrowly won the Democratic primary election for U.S. Senator in 1988, defeating Samuel Beard, an heir to a railroad fortune and resident of Greenville, by just 71 votes. In fact, the election appeared to be lost until an error in the tabulation was discovered, which changed the result. Woo lost the general election to incumbent Republican Senator William Roth. In 1992, he was the Democratic nominee for the U.S. House from Delaware's at-large congressional district but lost to Republican nominee Mike Castle by 12 points.

Woo became an independent in 2000 and announced his intention not to accept a federal appointment in order to advance public perception of his neutrality without any personal partisan benefit.

== Professional career ==
Woo is a leader in the greater Chinese American community throughout the country from which his political activities dependably received strong financial backing. He is the founding president of the 80-20 Initiative, a group that attempts to organize Asian Pacific Americans (APAs) into a swing bloc-vote in presidential elections, intending to induce both major political parties to take the interests of the APA community into consideration. He also serves as a professor emeritus of physics and trustee of the University of Delaware from 1976 to 1982, and an Institute Fellow at the Harvard Institute of Politics at Harvard Kennedy School (1989).

After Woo retired as a trustee, the University of Delaware's Faculty Senate passed a written tribute thanking him for his "courage, integrity and independence of thought [which] enable him to set a performance standard of the highest quality."

A life-sized picture of him is displayed in the National Museum of American History in Washington, D.C. Another picture of him is in an interactive display in the lobby of Asia Society in New York City. In 2000, A Magazine ranked him the 6th of the 25 Most Influential Asian Americans.

Since retiring from academia, Woo has shifted to volunteer work. He is the founding president of two national organizations: the 80-20 Educational Foundation, Inc. (EF), a 501(c)(3) nonprofit with assets of about US$8.4 million, and the 80-20 Asian American Empowerment PAC, with assets of about $200,000. While financially independent, both organizations share the mission of advancing equal opportunity and justice for Asian Americans. Together, they maintain an email list of more than 156,000 Asian American subscribers and distribute weekly e-newsletters. All officers and board members of both organizations serve as volunteers and contribute financially.

Under Woo’s leadership, the PAC has played a role in national politics. During the 2008 presidential campaign, nine of the ten Democratic candidates including Barack Obama, Joe Biden, and Hillary Clinton signed written responses to the PAC’s questionnaire affirming their commitment to issues important to Asian Americans. In 2023, the PAC targeted Representative Michelle Steel of California’s 45th congressional district, ultimately contributing to her defeat in her reelection campaign.

The Educational Foundation has focused on legal and educational equality, most notably by supporting Students for Fair Admissions in its decade-long case against Harvard University. The U.S. Supreme Court’s 2023 ruling against Harvard’s admissions policies was described by the Foundation as a landmark victory for Asian American applicants to elite universities. After the decision, EF engaged in self-examination and continued outreach to highlight the broader implications of the case for equal opportunity in higher education.

== Electoral history ==
Elections are held on the first Tuesday after November 1. The Lieutenant Governor takes office the third Tuesday of January and has a four-year term.

Public Offices
Office	Type	Location	Elected	Began office	Ended office	Notes
Lt. Governor	Executive	Dover	1984	January 15, 1985	January 20, 1989	

Election results
Year	Office	Election	Subject	Party	Votes	%	Opponent	Party	Votes	%
1984	Lt. Governor	Primary	S. B. Woo	Democratic	14,131	42%	Nancy W. Cook; David B. McBride	Democratic	10,590; 9,260	31% 27%
1984	Lt. Governor	General	S. B. Woo	Democratic	121,095	50%	Battle R. Robinson	Republican	120,666	50%
1988	U.S. Senator	Primary	S. B. Woo	Democratic	20,225	50%	Samuel S. Beard	Democratic	20,154	50%
1988	U.S. Senator	General	S. B. Woo	Democratic	92,378	38%	William Roth	Republican	151,115	62%
1992	U.S. Representative	Primary	S. B. Woo	Democratic	28,732	74%	Ernest L. Ercole	Democratic	10,329	26%
1992	U.S. Representative	General	S. B. Woo	Democratic	117,426	43%	Mike Castle	Republican	153,037	55%

== See also ==
- List of minority governors and lieutenant governors in the United States

Political offices
Preceded by Mike Castle	Lieutenant Governor of Delaware; 1985–1989	Succeeded by Dale E. Wolf
Party political offices
Preceded by David Levinson	Democratic nominee for U.S. Senator from Delaware (Class 1); 1988	Succeeded by Charles Oberly
