= 1948 Delaware lieutenant gubernatorial election =

- November 2, 1948
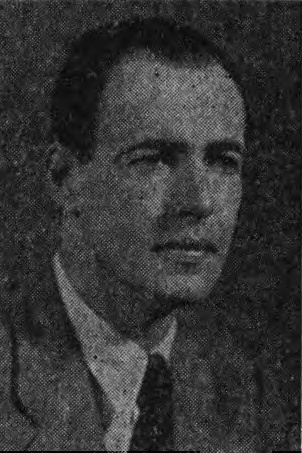

Nominee	Alexis I. du Pont Bayard	Chester V. Townsend Jr.
Party	Democratic	Republican
Popular vote	74,605	65,545
Percentage	53.23%	46.77%
- County results du Pont: 50–60%
Lieutenant Governor before election
Elbert N. Carvel
Democratic
Elected Lieutenant Governor
Alexis I. du Pont Bayard
Democratic

The 1948 Delaware lieutenant gubernatorial election was held on November 2, 1948, in order to elect the lieutenant governor of Delaware. Democratic nominee Alexis I. du Pont Bayard defeated Republican nominee Chester V. Townsend Jr.

== General election ==
On election day, November 2, 1948, Democratic nominee Alexis I. du Pont Bayard won the election by a margin of 9,060 votes against his opponent Republican nominee Chester V. Townsend Jr., thereby retaining Democratic control over the office of lieutenant governor. Bayard was sworn in as the 13th lieutenant governor of Delaware on January 20, 1949.

=== Results ===
Delaware lieutenant gubernatorial election, 1948
Party	Candidate	Votes	%
Democratic	Alexis I. du Pont Bayard	74,605	53.23
Republican	Chester V. Townsend Jr.	65,545	46.77
Total votes		140,150	100.00
Democratic hold			
