= 1940 Delaware lieutenant gubernatorial election =

- November 5, 1940

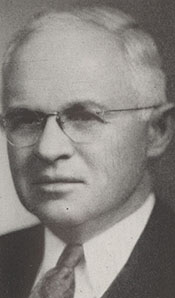
Nominee	Isaac J. MacCollum	Earle D. Willey
Party	Democratic	Republican
Popular vote	65,949	65,427
Percentage	49.32%	48.93%
- County results MacCollum: 40–50% Willey: 50–60%
Lieutenant Governor before election
Edward W. Cooch
Democratic
Elected Lieutenant Governor
Isaac J. MacCollum
Democratic

The 1940 Delaware lieutenant gubernatorial election was held on November 5, 1940, in order to elect the lieutenant governor of Delaware. Democratic nominee Isaac J. MacCollum defeated Republican nominee Earle D. Willey and Liberal Democratic nominee David A. Waxman.

== General election ==
On election day, November 5, 1940, Democratic nominee Isaac J. MacCollum won the election by a margin of 522 votes against his foremost opponent Republican nominee Earle D. Willey, thereby retaining Democratic control over the office of lieutenant governor. MacCollum was sworn in as the 11th lieutenant governor of Delaware on January 21, 1941.

=== Results ===
Delaware lieutenant gubernatorial election, 1940
Party	Candidate	Votes	%
Democratic	Isaac J. MacCollum	65,949	49.32
Republican	Earle D. Willey	65,427	48.93
Liberal Democratic Party	David A. Waxman	2,352	1.75
Total votes		133,728	100.00
Democratic hold			
