= Samuel Beard (public servant) =

American activist

Sam Beard (born 1939) is a social entrepreneur, and public servant. With Jacqueline Kennedy Onassis and Robert Taft Jr., Sam created and Co-Chaired the Jefferson Awards, an American Nobel Prize for public service and youth leadership training. The Jefferson Awards has since been re-branded to Multiplying Good, and impacts one million students a year.

== Early life and education ==
Beard was raised in New York City and graduated with a BA from Yale University in 1961, an MA from Columbia University in 1965, and attended Stanford Law School from 1962-1963. Sam began his career working with U.S. Senator Robert F. Kennedy in Bedford-Stuyvesant, a low-income community in Brooklyn, New York focusing on social justice and the elimination of poverty.

== Career ==
In 1969 after the assassination of Senator Kennedy, Beard founded the National Development Council. The council has since been responsible for billions of dollars of revitalization financing.

Beard has initiated and chaired programs for eight Presidents of the United States, including Presidents Nixon, Gerald Ford, Jimmy Carter, Ronald Reagan, Bush, Clinton and Bush. One highlight of working with the eight presidents is the creation of more than 10 million jobs in impoverished communities across America.

Beard ran in the Democratic primary for the 1988 U.S. Senate election in Delaware. In 1992, he helped to create the President's Youth Service Awards for volunteerism. Beard also worked with former Delaware Governor Pete du Pont and Wilmington Mayor, Bill McLaughlin to revitalize the Wilmington, Delaware riverfront. He also served on President George W. Bush's Social Security Reform Commission.

Recently, Beard founded the non-profit organization GIFT (Global Investment Foundation for Tomorrow) to harness the full impact of the mindfulness and meditation movements to solve urgent global problems.

The inspiration for GIFT came out of his experience in using mindfulness and meditation techniques to deal with a high stress period. Beard was excited at the far-reaching impact it had in improving all aspects of his life. This interest soon grew into a mission Sam predicts will be the most significant outcome in his life of service - Early Childhood Development - Birth to Three.

By the age of three, newborns and toddlers experience the most rapid cognitive and socio-emotional development in their lives. The first three years define a child's success in school and later in life. The goal is to develop limitless potential to every baby. The brain science is proven and globally accepted.

== Personal life ==
Sam is married to Joan Beard, and has three children. Alex Beard is an artist in New Orleans, Hillary Schafer runs Multiplying Good in New York City, and Morgan Beard is a Life Coach in Los Angeles. Sam also has five grandchildren.
