= James D. McGinnis =

American politician (1932–2009)

19th Lieutenant Governor of Delaware
- In office January 18, 1977 – January 20, 1981
- Governor: Pete du Pont
- Preceded by: Eugene Bookhammer
- Succeeded by: Mike Castle

Personal details
- Born: January 11, 1932 Chicago, Illinois, U.S.
- Died: February 24, 2009 (aged 77) Dover, Delaware, U.S.
- Party: Democratic
- Occupation: Realtor

James D. McGinnis (January 11, 1932 – February 24, 2009) was an American real estate agent and politician from Dover in Kent County, Delaware. He was a member of the Democratic Party, and served as 19th Lieutenant Governor of Delaware.

== Professional career ==
McGinnis was born in Chicago, Illinois, and moved to Dover, Delaware, in 1954. In 1964 he entered the real estate business by selling and leasing commercial property. He worked in the industry for eleven years before earning his broker's license from the Delaware Real Estate Commission in 1975. McGinnis earned a Certified Commercial Investment Member (CCIM) designation from the National Association of Realtors and is a member of the Kent County Association of Realtors, Delaware Association of Realtors, and National Association of Realtors. From 1990 to 1992, he served on the Landlord-Tenant Committee for the Kent County Realtors Association.

== Political career ==
McGinnis first won elected office in 1962, when he was elected to the Delaware House of Representatives. In 1964, after only one term in the House, McGinnis won election to the Delaware Senate, holding his seat until 1966.

Upon the retirement of Democratic state representative Ralph R. Smith in 1972, McGinnis returned to the State House by winning Smith's seat in Delaware's 32nd Representative district. He was reelected in 1974 and served as majority leader from 1975 to 1976.

McGinnis's legislative prowess led Delaware Democrats to nominate him for lieutenant governor. The Democratic candidate for Governor was incumbent Sherman W. Tribbitt, running for reelection amid a financial crisis. Then U.S. Congressman and du Pont family heir Pete du Pont defeated Tribbitt for governor by a 14-point margin. Despite this overwhelming defeat by the Democratic gubernatorial candidate, McGinnis won his race for lieutenant governor, defeating Republican Andrew Foltz by a slim 1.5 point margin.

In 1980 McGinnis declined to run for reelection as lieutenant governor, instead opting to run for governor. However, he and most of the other Democratic contenders dropped out of the primary in favor of eventual nominee William J. Gordy. Gordy lost to incumbent governor du Pont. The Democratic candidate for lieutenant governor was State Senate Majority Leader and future President Pro Tempore Thomas B. Sharp, who lost the election to future governor Mike Castle by 18%.

In March 1997, Democratic governor Tom Carper recognized McGinnis's combined experience in the areas of politics and real estate by appointing him to a three-year term on the Delaware Real Estate Commission. He has been reappointed since then by Carper and his successor, Ruth Ann Minner. Minner and McGinnis had served together in the State House from 1975 to 1977, when McGinnis was the floor leader for their caucus and Minner was in her first term.

== Almanac ==
Elections are held the first Tuesday after November 1. Members of the Delaware General Assembly take office the second Tuesday of January. The lieutenant governor takes office the third Tuesday of January.

Public offices
Office	Type	Location	Elected	Began office	Ended office	Notes
State Representative	Legislature	Dover	1962	January 8, 1963	January 12, 1965	
State Senator	Legislature	Dover	1964	January 12, 1965	January 10, 1967	
State Representative	Legislature	Dover	1972	January 9, 1973	January 14, 1975	
State Representative	Legislature	Dover	1974	January 14, 1975	January 11, 1977	Majority Leader
Lt. Governor	Executive	Dover	1976	January 18, 1977	January 20, 1981	

Delaware General Assembly service
Dates	Assembly	Chamber	Majority	Governor	Committees	District
1963–1964	122nd	State House	Democratic	Elbert N. Carvel		2nd Kent
1965–1966	123rd	State Senate	Democratic	Charles L. Terry Jr.		14th
1973–1974	127th	State House	Republican	Sherman W. Tribbitt		32nd
1975–1976	128th	State House	Democratic	Sherman W. Tribbitt		32nd

Election results
Year	Office	Subject	Party	Votes	%	Opponent	Party	Votes	%
1962	State Representative	James D. McGinnis	Democratic				Republican		
1964	State Representative	James D. McGinnis	Democratic				Republican		
1972	State Representative	James D. McGinnis	Democratic	2,884	55.3%	J. Ronald Fidler	Republican	2,330	44.7%
1974	State Representative	James D. McGinnis	Democratic	2,562	61.6%	Andrea L. Barros	Republican	1,599	38.4%
1976	Lt. Governor	James D. McGinnis	Democratic	110,328	50.4%	Andrew Foltz	Republican	107,075	48.9%

Party political offices
Preceded by Clifford B. Hearn	Democratic nominee for Lieutenant Governor of Delaware; 1976	Succeeded by Thomas B. Sharp
