= Lieutenant Governor of Delaware =

Elected state official

- Great Seal of the State of Delaware

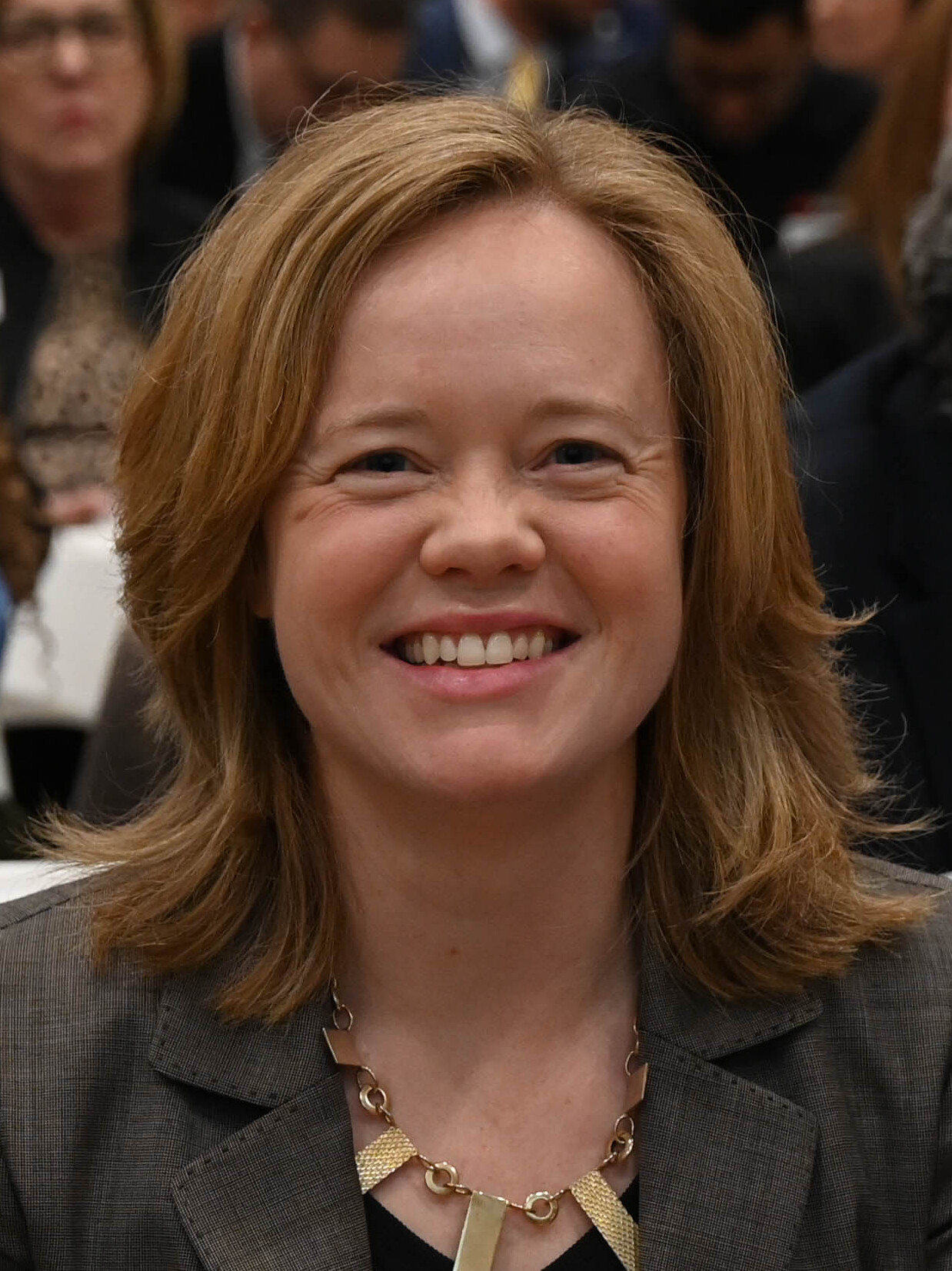
- Incumbent; Kyle Evans Gay since January 21, 2025
- Government of Delaware
- Style: Madam Lieutenant Governor
- Term length: Four years, renewable once
- Inaugural holder: Philip L. Cannon
- Succession: First
- Website: Official website

The lieutenant governor of Delaware is the second-ranking executive officer of the U.S. state of Delaware. Lieutenant governors are elected for a term of four years in the same general election as the U.S. president, and assume the office on the third Tuesday in January following their election.

Among the primary responsibilities of the lieutenant governor is to assume the governorship in the event it becomes vacant. Lieutenant governors serve as the president of the Delaware Senate, where they are tasked with casting tie-breaking votes. They also hold a seat on the Delaware Board of Pardons.

Lieutenant governors are elected separately from governors in Delaware, though historically nominees of the same party have run as a unified ticket. The office's current occupant, Kyle Evans Gay, was sworn in on January 21, 2025.

== History ==
The position of lieutenant governor was established by the Constitution of Delaware in 1897. The first election for the office took place in 1900, when it was won by Philip L. Cannon. Since then, a total of 27 individuals (15 Democrats and 12 Republicans) have held the lieutenant governorship.

On December 30, 1960, Lieutenant Governor David P. Buckson became the first occupant of the office to ascend to the governorship. He served the remaining two weeks of the term of J. Caleb Boggs, who resigned from office ahead of his inauguration as a United States senator.

Though lieutenant governors are permitted to serve two terms, none sought reelection until Eugene Bookhammer in 1972. No lieutenant governor who has pursued a second term has ever lost reelection of renomination to the office.

Despite being separately elected positions, Delaware has historically chosen governors and lieutenant governors of the same party. The last time voters split their tickets for the two offices was in 1984, when Democrat S. B. Woo won the lieutenant governorship at the same time as Mike Castle won the governorship.

Reflecting Delaware's increasingly Democratic political lean, no Republican has won the office since 1988.

Kyle Evans Gay is the current lieutenant governor, having taken office January 21, 2025.

The offices of the lieutenant governor are at the state capital of Dover. Lieutenant governors receive an annual salary of $83,884.

== List ==
Democratic (15) Republican (12)

Lieutenant governors of Delaware
No.	Lieutenant Governor	Term in office	Party	Election	Governor
1	Philip L. Cannon (1850–1929)	January 15, 1901 – January 17, 1905 (did not run)	Republican	1900	John Hunn
2	Isaac T. Parker (1849–1911)	January 15, 1905 – January 19, 1909 (did not run)	Republican	1904	Preston Lea
3	John M. Mendinhall (1861–1938)	January 19, 1909 – January 21, 1913 (did not run)	Republican	1908	Simeon S. Pennewill
4	Colen Ferguson (1835–1917)	January 21, 1913 – January 16, 1917 (did not run)	Democratic	1912	Charles R. Miller
5	Lewis E. Eliason (1850–1919)	January 16, 1917 – May 2, 1919 (died in office)	Democratic	1916	John G. Townsend Jr.
—	Office vacant May 2, 1919 – January 18, 1921				John G. Townsend Jr.
6	J. Danforth Bush (1868–1926)	January 18, 1921 – January 20, 1925 (did not run)	Republican	1920	William D. Denney
7	James H. Anderson (1878–1936)	January 20, 1925 – January 15, 1929 (did not run)	Republican	1924	Robert P. Robinson
8	James H. Hazel (1888–1965)	January 15, 1929 – January 17, 1933 (did not run)	Republican	1928	C. Douglass Buck
9	Roy F. Corley (1874–1953)	January 17, 1933 – January 19, 1937 (did not run)	Republican	1932	C. Douglass Buck
10	Edward W. Cooch (1876–1964)	January 19, 1937 – January 21, 1941 (did not run)	Democratic	1936	Richard McMullen
11	Isaac J. MacCollum (1889–1968)	January 21, 1941 – January 16, 1945 (did not run)	Democratic	1940	Walter W. Bacon
12	Elbert N. Carvel (1910–2005)	January 16, 1945 – January 18, 1949 (did not run)	Democratic	1944	Walter W. Bacon
13	Alexis I. du Pont Bayard (1918–1985)	January 18, 1949 – January 20, 1953 (did not run)	Democratic	1948	Elbert N. Carvel
14	John W. Rollins (1916–2000)	January 20, 1953 – January 15, 1957 (did not run)	Republican	1952	J. Caleb Boggs
15	David P. Buckson (1920–2017)	January 15, 1957 – December 30, 1960 (succeeded to governor)	Republican	1956	J. Caleb Boggs
—	Office vacant December 30, 1960 – January 17, 1961				David P. Buckson
16	Eugene Lammot (1899–1987)	January 17, 1961 – January 19, 1965 (did not run)	Democratic	1960	Elbert N. Carvel
17	Sherman W. Tribbitt (1922–2010)	January 19, 1965 – January 21, 1969 (did not run)	Democratic	1964	Charles L. Terry Jr.
18	Eugene Bookhammer (1918–2013)	January 21, 1969 – January 18, 1977 (term-limited)	Republican	1968	Russell W. Peterson
18	Eugene Bookhammer (1918–2013)	January 21, 1969 – January 18, 1977 (term-limited)	Republican	1972	Sherman W. Tribbitt
19	James D. McGinnis (1932–2009)	January 18, 1977 – January 20, 1981 (did not run)	Democratic	1976	Pete du Pont
20	Mike Castle (1939–2025)	January 20, 1981 – January 15, 1985 (did not run)	Republican	1980	Pete du Pont
21	S. B. Woo (born 1937)	January 15, 1985 – January 20, 1989 (did not run)	Democratic	1984	Mike Castle
22	Dale E. Wolf (1924–2021)	January 20, 1989 – December 31, 1992 (succeeded to governor)	Republican	1988	Mike Castle
—	Office vacant December 31, 1992 – January 19, 1993				Dale E. Wolf
23	Ruth Ann Minner (1935–2021)	January 19, 1993 – January 3, 2001 (succeeded to governor)	Democratic	1992	Tom Carper
23	Ruth Ann Minner (1935–2021)	January 19, 1993 – January 3, 2001 (succeeded to governor)	Democratic	1996	Tom Carper
—	Office vacant January 3, 2001 – January 16, 2001				Ruth Ann Minner
24	John Carney (born 1956)	January 16, 2001 – January 20, 2009 (term-limited)	Democratic	2000	Ruth Ann Minner
24	John Carney (born 1956)	January 16, 2001 – January 20, 2009 (term-limited)	Democratic	2004	Ruth Ann Minner
25	Matthew Denn (born 1966)	January 20, 2009 – January 6, 2015 (resigned)	Democratic	2008	Jack Markell
25	Matthew Denn (born 1966)	January 20, 2009 – January 6, 2015 (resigned)	Democratic	2012	Jack Markell
—	Office vacant January 6, 2015 – January 17, 2017				Jack Markell
26	Bethany Hall-Long (born 1963)	January 17, 2017 – January 7, 2025 (succeeded to governor)	Democratic	2016	John Carney
26	Bethany Hall-Long (born 1963)	January 17, 2017 – January 7, 2025 (succeeded to governor)	Democratic	2020	John Carney
—	Office vacant January 7, 2025 – January 21, 2025				Bethany Hall-Long
27	Kyle Evans Gay (born 1986)	January 21, 2025 – Incumbent	Democratic	2024	Matt Meyer
