= Eugene Bookhammer =

American politician (1918–2013)

Eugene D. Bookhammer
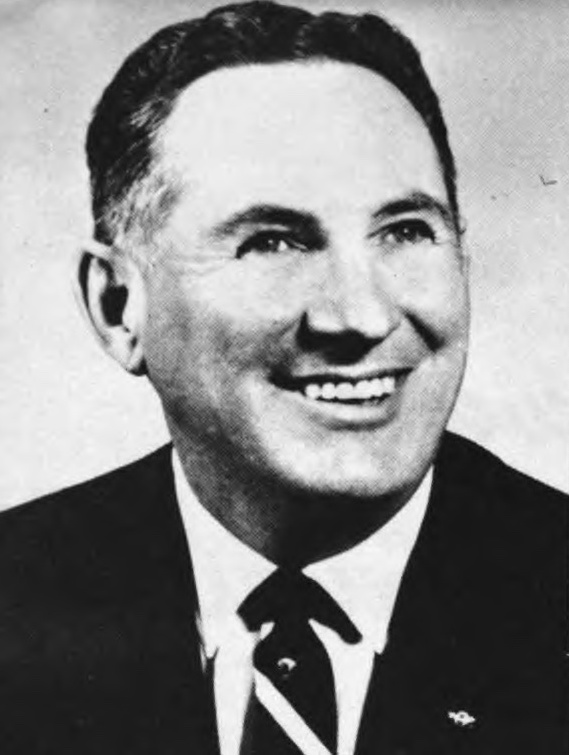

18th Lieutenant Governor of Delaware
- In office January 21, 1969 – January 18, 1977
- Governor: Russell W. Peterson; Sherman W. Tribbitt
- Preceded by: Sherman W. Tribbitt
- Succeeded by: James D. McGinnis

16th Chair of the National Lieutenant Governors Association
- In office 1975–1976
- Preceded by: Blair Lee III
- Succeeded by: William P. Hobby Jr.

Personal details
- Born: June 14, 1918 Lewes, Delaware, U.S.
- Died: February 23, 2013 (aged 94) Lewes, Delaware, U.S.
- Party: Republican
- Profession: Businessman, politician
- Awards: Bronze Star, Purple Heart

Military service
- Branch/service: United States Army

Eugene Donald Bookhammer (June 14, 1918 – February 23, 2013) was an American politician who served as the 18th Lieutenant Governor of Delaware, as a Republican, from 1969 to 1977. He served under Governors Russell W. Peterson and Sherman W. Tribbitt. Before his election as lieutenant governor, he had served in the Delaware State Senate since 1962.

Born in Lewes, Delaware, Bookhammer graduated from Lewes High School and served in the U.S. Army during World War II, receiving the Purple Heart and the Bronze Star. He was in the lumber mill business. With author Richard Carter, in 2009 he wrote his biography, Gene Bookhammer and His World. He died at his home in Lewes in February 2013 at the age of 94.

Party political offices
Preceded by William T. Best	Republican nominee for Lieutenant Governor of Delaware; 1968, 1972	Succeeded by Andrew Foltz
Political offices
Preceded by Sherman W. Tribbitt	Lieutenant Governor of Delaware; 1969–1977	Succeeded by James D. McGinnis
