= Mike Castle =

American politician (1939–2025)

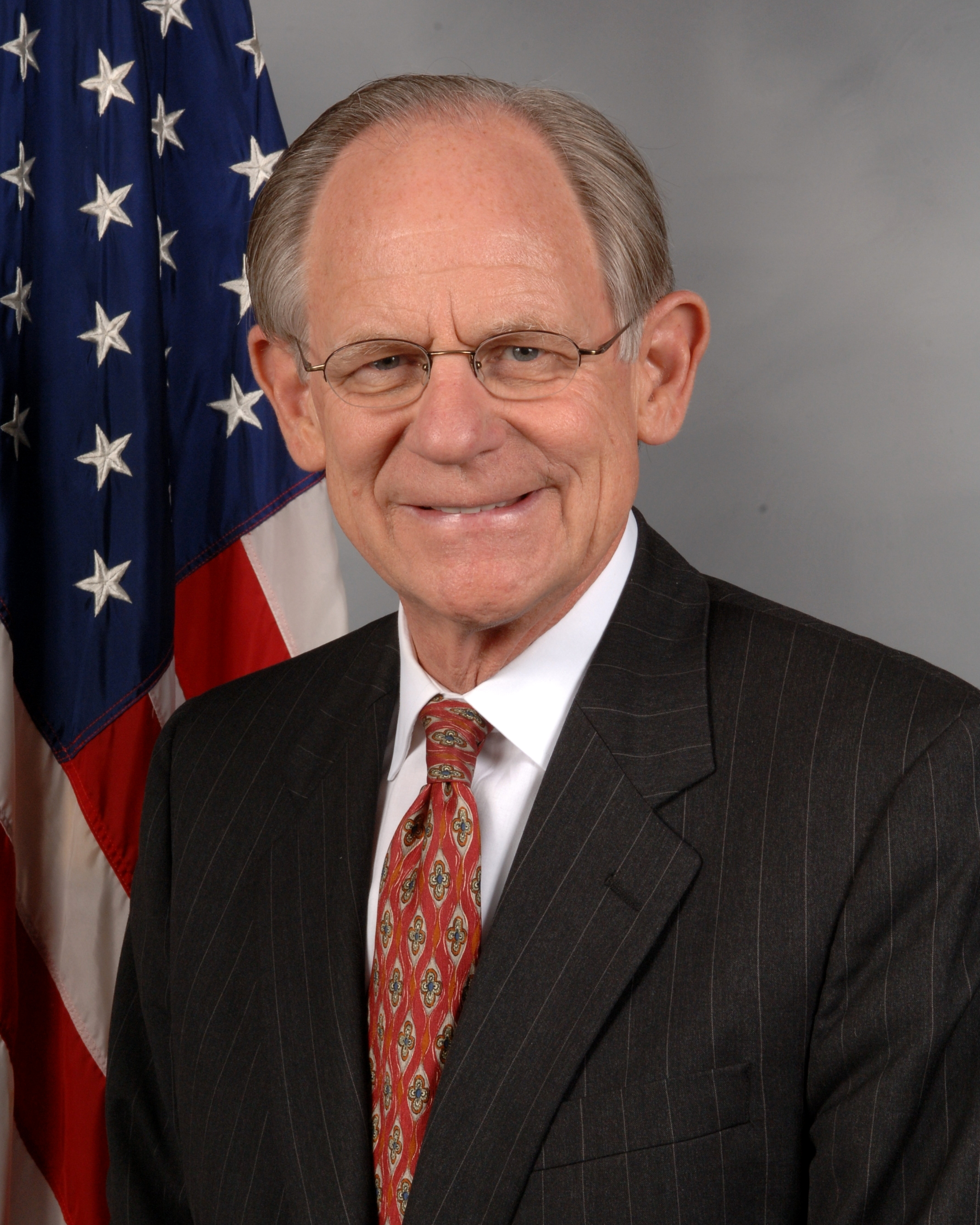
- Official portrait, 2006

Member of the U.S. House of Representatives from Delaware's at-large district
- In office January 3, 1993 – January 3, 2011
- Preceded by: Tom Carper
- Succeeded by: John Carney

69th Governor of Delaware
- In office January 15, 1985 – December 31, 1992
- Lieutenant: S. B. Woo; Dale E. Wolf
- Preceded by: Pete du Pont
- Succeeded by: Dale E. Wolf

20th Lieutenant Governor of Delaware
- In office January 20, 1981 – January 15, 1985
- Governor: Pete du Pont
- Preceded by: James D. McGinnis
- Succeeded by: S. B. Woo

Member of the Delaware Senate from the 1st district
- In office January 7, 1969 – January 4, 1977
- Preceded by: Russell Dineen
- Succeeded by: Harris McDowell III

Member of the Delaware House of Representatives from the 6th district
- In office January 3, 1967 – January 7, 1969
- Preceded by: Frank Parisi
- Succeeded by: George Hering

Personal details
- Born: Michael Newbold Castle; July 2, 1939 Wilmington, Delaware, U.S.
- Died: August 14, 2025 (aged 86) Wilmington, Delaware, U.S.
- Party: Republican
- Spouse: Jane DiSabatino (m. 1992)
- Education: Hamilton College (BS); Georgetown University (LLB)
- Castle's voice Castle supporting the Presidential $1 Coin Act of 2005. Recorded April 26, 2005

Michael Newbold Castle (July 2, 1939 – August 14, 2025) was an American politician and lawyer who served as the U.S. representative for Delaware's at-large congressional district from 1993 to 2011. A member of the Republican Party, he previously served as the 69th governor of Delaware from 1985 to 1992, lieutenant governor from 1981 to 1985, and as a member of the Delaware General Assembly from 1967 to 1977. As of 2025, Castle is the most recent Republican to represent Delaware in the U.S. Congress and to have been elected governor of the state.

The district Castle represented includes the entire state of Delaware and is the oldest intact surviving district in the nation. He was the longest-serving U.S. Representative in the state's history.

On October 6, 2009, Castle announced his candidacy in the 2010 special election for the seat in the United States Senate held by Democrat Ted Kaufman. Kaufman, appointed by Governor Ruth Ann Minner to fill the vacancy created by Joe Biden (who resigned to become vice president of the United States), was not a candidate in the election. The election determined who would fill the balance of Biden's term, which ended on January 3, 2015. In one of the most surprising election results of 2010, Castle lost the Republican primary to Christine O'Donnell. He would have been heavily favored in the general election against Democrat Chris Coons, who defeated O'Donnell by 17 percentage points.

== Early life and education ==
Michael Newbold Castle was born on July 2, 1939, in Wilmington, Delaware, the son of Louisa Johnston (née Bache) and James Manderson Castle Jr. One of his maternal great-great-grandfathers was Virginia U.S. Senator John W. Johnston, and Castle's fifth great-grandfathers were founding fathers Benjamin Franklin and Daniel Carroll. Castle's father was a patent lawyer for DuPont, a firm so central to the city that it was long known in Wilmington simply as "the company." After graduating from Tower Hill School in 1957, he attended Hamilton College in Clinton, Oneida County, New York. He earned a Bachelor of Science degree in economics from Hamilton in 1961. While at Hamilton, Castle was a brother of the Alpha Delta Phi fraternity.

In 1964, he earned a Juris Doctor degree from Georgetown University Law Center in Washington, D.C. He was admitted to both the Delaware Bar and the Washington, D.C., Bar that same year.

== Professional and political career ==
Following his admission to the bar, Castle returned to Wilmington and joined Connolly, Bove and Lodge, working as an associate (1964–1973) and later partner (1973–1975). A Republican, he served as Deputy Attorney General of Delaware from 1965 to 1966, and was elected to the Delaware House of Representatives in 1966. He served as a state representative for two years before winning a seat in the Delaware Senate, where he remained for eight years. He also served as minority leader from 1975 to 1976.

In 1976, Castle left the state legislature and returned to the full-time practice of law, founding his own firm with Carl Schnee (who was later nominated as U.S. Attorney for the District of Delaware by President Bill Clinton in 1999). He returned to politics in 1980, when he was recruited to run for Lieutenant Governor of Delaware by Governor Pete du Pont. He defeated Democratic state senator Thomas B. Sharp, with 59% to 40% of the vote. He served from 1981 to 1985.

== Governor of Delaware ==
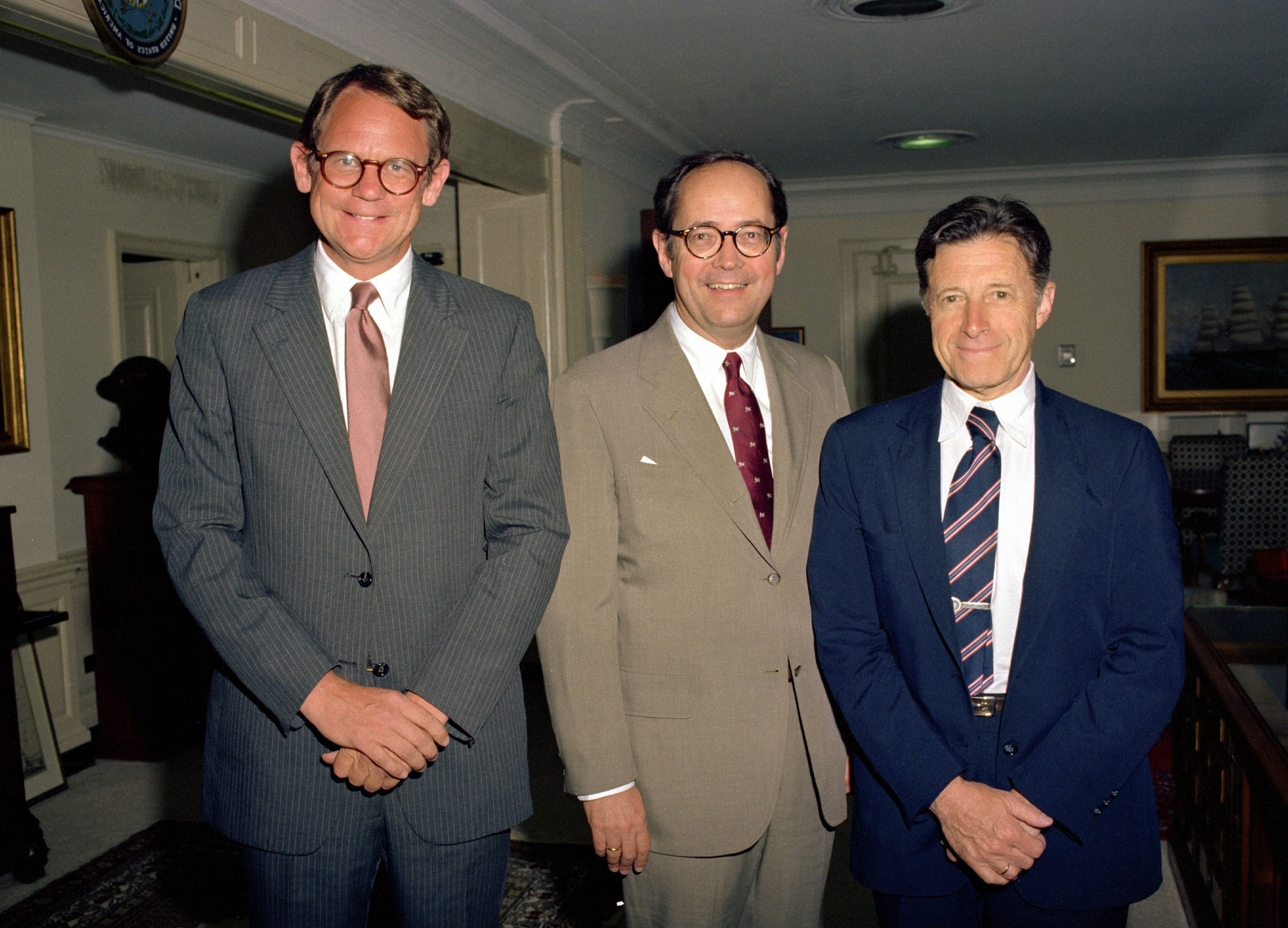
Lt. Governor Castle (left) with Governor Dick Thornburgh of Pennsylvania (center) and Secretary of Defense Caspar Weinberger, July 1982.

As the hand-picked choice of the popular Governor du Pont, Castle easily won election as Governor of Delaware in 1984, defeating former Delaware Supreme Court Justice William T. Quillen. Voters re-elected him to another term in 1988 when he defeated Democrat Jacob Kreshtool by 99,479 votes, and is the last time a Republican won a governor election in the state. Castle cut his second term slightly short when he resigned to begin his first term as U.S. Representative.

One of Castle's priorities as governor was welfare reform. He worked to pass a comprehensive welfare reform package with the White House and Congress and also served as lead governor on welfare reform on the National Governors Association. He worked on the largest road-construction project in state history, with his administration establishing the Transportation Trust Fund that paid for the construction of Delaware Route 1. He also worked on the improvement of schools, supported the preservation of farmland, and backed "banking industry expansion and anti-takeover legislation for corporations".

== United States Representative ==
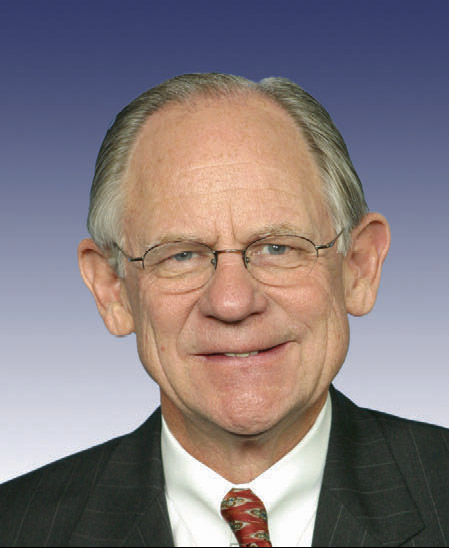
Castle during the 109th Congress

=== Committee assignments ===
- Committee on Education and Labor
  - Subcommittee on Early Childhood, Elementary and Secondary Education (Ranking Member)
  - Subcommittee on Higher Education, Lifelong Learning, and Competitiveness
- Committee on Financial Services
  - Subcommittee on Capital Markets, Insurance, and Government-Sponsored Enterprises
  - Subcommittee on Financial Institutions and Consumer Credit
  - Subcommittee on Domestic Monetary Policy and Technology

In 1992, Castle could not run again for Governor, due to constitutional term limits. The result was what became known as "the Swap." Castle ran for the seat of U.S. Representative Tom Carper and Carper ran for Governor. Delaware's political leadership had quietly worked out the arrangement and retained the services of two very popular office holders. Both Castle and Carper won their races by large margins.

Castle was first elected U.S. Representative in 1992, defeating former Lieutenant Governor Shien Biau Woo. Later, he won election by wide margins eight times, defeating Democrats Carol Ann DeSantis in 1994, Dennis E. Williams in 1996 and 1998, Michael C. Miller in 2000 and 2002, Paul Donnelly in 2004, Dennis Spivack in 2006, and Karen Hartley-Nagle in 2008. He suffered two minor strokes during the 2006 campaign, but fully recovered.

Castle was the co-chair of several Congressional caucuses, including the Diabetes Caucus, the Community College Caucus, the Biomedical Research Caucus, and the Passenger Rail Caucus. He was also considered one of the most moderate Republicans in the U.S. House. In the wake of Tom DeLay's indictment in September 2005, liberal columnist E.J. Dionne named Castle as one of four lawmakers capable of leading an anticorruption reform of the Republican Party. Castle was a member of various liberal Republican Organizations, such as Republicans For Environmental Protection, The Republican Majority For Choice, Republicans For Choice, and Christine Todd Whitman's Its My Party Too. He was pro-choice and supported some gun control measures. He voted against a constitutional amendment that would have banned same-sex marriage. The non-partisan National Journal gave Mike Castle an ideological composite score of 59% conservative and 41% liberal.

Castle's centrist positions served him well in a state that trended increasingly Democratic during his tenure in the House. Delaware had long been reckoned as a bellwether, but has voted Democratic in every presidential election since 1992, due almost entirely to heavily Democratic New Castle County. At the same time, his centrist record made him the target of conservative groups such as Club for Growth, who ranked him the least conservative Republican in the U.S. House in 2008, and RemoveRINOs, who, in April 2010, named him the Ace of Spades on its most-wanted list.

In February 2004, Castle sponsored H.R. 3831 to reauthorize the assault weapons ban of 1994. The bill was co-sponsored by 11 Republican colleagues and 129 Democrats. In June 2008, Rep. Mark Kirk, R-IL, introduced H.R. 6257 to reinstate the ban, and Castle was one of the bill's four Republican co-sponsors. Both bills died in committee.

Castle co-sponsored the Stem Cell Research Enhancement Act. The bill proposed expanding the number of embryonic stem cell lines that are eligible for federally funded research, expecting that this funding would generate more research and ultimately greater progress in developing new treatments for a wide range of medical conditions. After successfully passing both the U.S. Senate and the U.S. House, it received U.S. President George W. Bush's first presidential veto in July 2006.

In December 2010, Castle was one of fifteen Republican House members to vote in favor of repealing the United States military's "Don't Ask, Don't Tell" ban on openly gay service members.

During his time in Congress, Castle was known for his interest in numismatics. In 1995, he authored the legislation that created the American Platinum Eagle platinum bullion coin. He later sponsored the legislation that created the 50 State quarters, Sacagawea dollar, presidential dollar coins, and America the Beautiful quarters programs, and several commemorative coins. His activity led the Numismatic Guaranty Company to deem him "The Coinage Congressman." Castle drafted one sentence of the 1997 Omnibus Consolidated Appropriations Act: "Notwithstanding any other provision of law, the Secretary of the Treasury may mint and issue platinum coins in such quantity and of such variety as the Secretary determines to be appropriate." His intent was to make it easier for the Treasury to mint platinum coins for the coin collector market, but the sentence allows the Treasury Department to mint platinum coinage in any denomination. In the event that Congress refused to raise the U.S. debt ceiling, the Treasury could thus mint a trillion-dollar coin to avoid default. This maneuver has been proposed by some commentators, but has never been done.

In November 2009, Castle's district was profiled by Stephen Colbert in his segment "Better Know a District."

== 2010 Senate campaign ==
In 2010, Castle ran to be the Republican candidate to fill the seat of former Senator Joe Biden, who had become vice president on January 20, 2009. Castle was defeated in the Republican primary on September 14, 2010, by Christine O'Donnell, the Tea Party favorite. The primary drew 57,000 voters, a small slice of the overall electorate. After the primary, Fairleigh Dickinson University's PublicMind twice polled Delaware voters, running a hypothetical match-up between Castle and the Democratic candidate, Chris Coons; in it, Castle beat Coons by a 21-point margin (54%–34%) and also had a favorable rating of 48% compared to O'Donnell's 34%. Castle refused to support O'Donnell in the Senate campaign against Coons. Coons went on to defeat O'Donnell decisively in the general election.

In June 2010, Castle was one of only two Republicans to vote in favor of the DISCLOSE Act, intended to limit spending on political campaigns by corporations in the wake of the U.S. Supreme Court's decision in Citizens United v. Federal Election Commission. The bill requires added disclosure for political spending by corporations and prohibits some corporate political spending.

=== Town hall ===
A town hall style meeting organized by Castle to discuss health care reform with constituents was featured on the Drudge Report with the headline "VIDEO: Congressman's town hall erupts over Obama birth certificate ...". The story was linked to a tape documenting a few minutes of the event and hosted on YouTube. The incident sparked discussion of the topic in relation to the moderate Republican congressman and commentators' surprise at the audience reaction. Castle was heckled and booed after calmly responding to a protester, "If you're referring to the President there, he is a citizen of the United States."

Reporting in the international press on the explosion of interest in the subject focused on the central role of the Castle incident. The British newspaper The Guardian reported:

But the real impact has been a video that has garnered hundreds of thousands of hits on the web (in which Congressman) Mike Castle, address(es) a town hall meeting on health care in Delaware last month when a woman suddenly stands up waving a bunch of papers ... The encounter was a warning to Republican officials how far the conspiracy theory has permeated parts of their party.

== Later political involvement ==
Castle was a member of the ReFormers Caucus of Issue One.

During the 2016 presidential election Castle endorsed eventual victor Donald Trump after initially backing John Kasich during the Republican primaries. In January 2021, Castle criticized Trump for "[antagonizing] people on a pretty regular basis" and described the events leading up to the January 6 United States Capitol attack as "nonsense" and that he "upheld the election from the beginning".

== Personal life and death ==
On May 23, 1992, Castle married Jane DiSabatino in Dover, Delaware.

Castle died in Greenville, Delaware, on August 14, 2025, at the age of 86.

== Electoral history ==
1980 Delaware lieutenant gubernatorial election
Party	Candidate	Votes	%
Republican	Mike Castle	128,827	58.72
Democratic	Thomas B. Sharp	88,224	40.21
N/A	Other	2,341	1.07
Total votes		219,392	100.00
Republican gain from Democratic			

1984 Delaware gubernatorial election
Party	Candidate	Votes	%
Republican	Mike Castle	135,250	55.53
Democratic	William T. Quillen	108,315	44.47
Total votes		243,565	100.00
Republican hold			

1988 Delaware gubernatorial election
Party	Candidate	Votes	%
Republican	Mike Castle (incumbent)	169,733	70.73
Democratic	Jacob Kreshtool	70,236	29.27
Total votes		239,969	100.00
Republican hold			

Delaware's at-large congressional district election, 1992
Party	Candidate	Votes	%
Republican	Mike Castle	153,037	55.42
Democratic	S.B. Woo	117,426	42.53
Libertarian	Peggy Schmitt	5,661	2.05
Total votes		276,124	100.00
Republican gain from Democratic			

Delaware's at-large congressional district election, 1994
Party	Candidate	Votes	%
Republican	Mike Castle (incumbent)	137,960	70.74
Democratic	Carol Ann DeSantis	97,565	26.56
Libertarian	Danny Ray Beaver	3,869	1.98
A Delaware Party	Donald M. Hockmuth	1,405	0.72
Total votes		195,037	100.00
Republican hold			

Delaware's at-large congressional district election, 1996
Party	Candidate	Votes	%
Republican	Mike Castle (incumbent)	185,576	69.55
Democratic	Dennis E. Williams	73,253	27.45
Libertarian	George Jurgensens	4,000	1.50
Constitution	Felicia Johnson	3,009	1.13
Natural Law	Bob Mattson	987	0.37
Total votes		275,591	100.00
Republican hold			

Delaware's at-large congressional district election, 1998
Party	Candidate	Votes	%
Republican	Mike Castle (incumbent)	119,811	66.36
Democratic	Dennis E. Williams	57,446	31.82
Constitution	James P. Webster	2,411	1.34
Natural Law	Kim Stanley Bemis	859	0.48
Total votes		180,527	100.00
Republican hold			

Delaware's at-large congressional district election, 2000
Party	Candidate	Votes	%
Republican	Mike Castle (incumbent)	211,797	67.64
Democratic	Michael C. Miller	96,488	30.81
Constitution	James P. Webster	2,490	0.80
Libertarian	Kim Stanley Bemis	2,351	0.75
Total votes		313,126	100.00
Republican hold			

Delaware's at-large congressional district election, 2002
Party	Candidate	Votes	%
Republican	Mike Castle (incumbent)	164,605	72.24
Democratic	Michael C. Miller	61,011	26.78
Libertarian	Brad C. Thomas	2,789	0.98
Total votes		227,865	100.00
Republican hold			

Delaware's at-large congressional district election, 2004
Party	Candidate	Votes	%
Republican	Mike Castle (incumbent)	245,808	69.09
Democratic	Paul Donnelly	105,634	29.69
Independent Party	Maurice J. Barros	2,334	0.66
Libertarian	William E. Morris	2,012	0.56
Total votes		355,788	100.00
Republican hold			

Delaware's at-large congressional district election, 2006
Party	Candidate	Votes	%
Republican	Mike Castle (incumbent)	143,897	57.17
Democratic	Dennis Spivack	97,565	38.76
Independent Party	Karen M. Hartley-Nagle	5,769	2.29
Green	Michael Berg	4,463	1.77
Total votes		251,694	100.00
Republican hold			

Delaware's at-large congressional district election, 2008
Party	Candidate	Votes	%
Republican	Mike Castle (incumbent)	235,437	61.08
Democratic	Karen Hartley-Nagle	146,434	37.99
Libertarian	Mark Parks	3,586	0.93
Total votes		385,457	100.00
Delaware Republican Party hold			

2010 Republican primary results for Delaware U.S. Senate
Party	Candidate	Votes	%
Republican	Christine O'Donnell	30,561	53.07
Republican	Mike Castle	27,021	46.93
Total votes		57,582	100.00

== Sources ==
- Barone, Michael; Richard E. Cohen (2005). Almanac of American Politics. Washington: National Journal Group. ISBN 0-89234-112-2.
- Boyer, William W. (2000). Governing Delaware. Newark, Delaware: University of Delaware Press. ISBN 1-892142-23-6.
- Hoffecker, Carol E. (2004). Democracy in Delaware. Wilmington, Delaware: Cedar Tree Books. ISBN 1-892142-23-6.
- Martin, Roger A. (1995). Memoirs of the Senate. Newark, DE: Roger A. Martin.

Political offices
Preceded by James D. McGinnis	Lieutenant Governor of Delaware; 1981–1985	Succeeded by Shien Biau Woo
Preceded by Pete du Pont	Governor of Delaware; 1985–1992	Succeeded by Dale E. Wolf
Party political offices
Preceded by Pete du Pont	Republican nominee for Governor of Delaware; 1984, 1988	Succeeded by Gary Scott
Preceded by Thomas Kean	Chair of the Republican Governors Association; 1987–1988	Succeeded by Mike Hayden
New office	Chair of the Tuesday Group; 1995–2005; Served alongside: Nancy Johnson, Fred Upton	Succeeded by Charles Bass; Mark Kirk
U.S. House of Representatives
Preceded by Tom Carper	Member of the U.S. House of Representatives from Delaware's at-large congressional district 1993–2011	Succeeded by John Carney
