= Dale E. Wolf =

American businessman and politician (1924–2021)

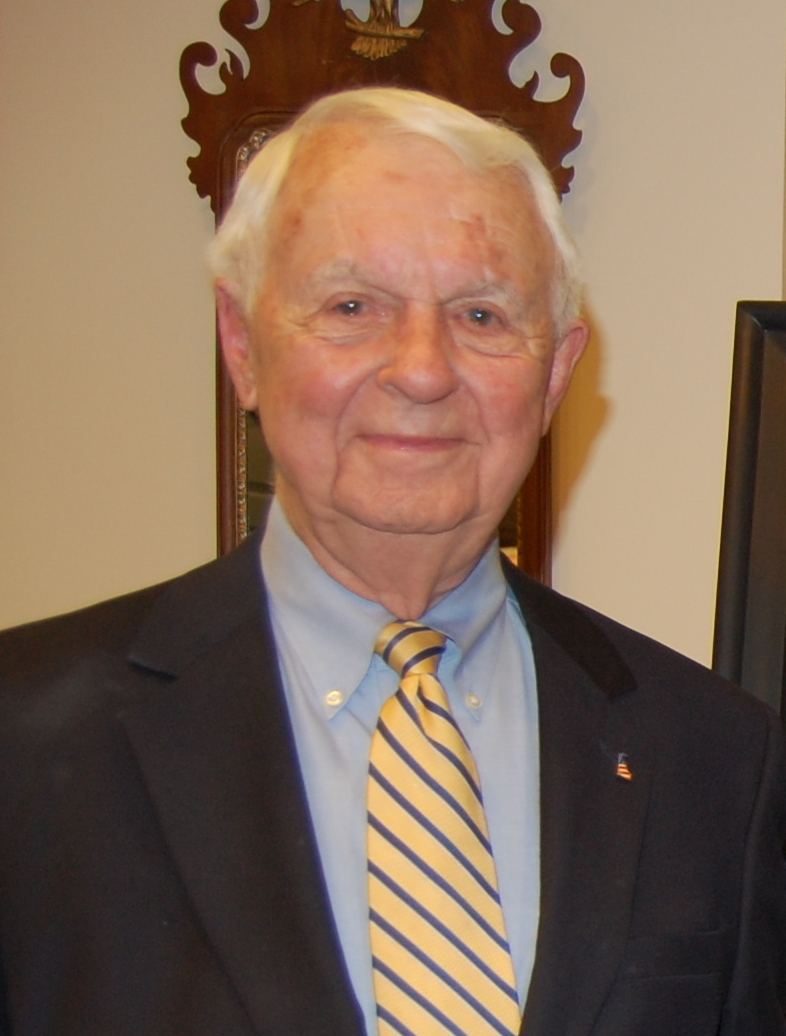

70th Governor of Delaware
- In office December 31, 1992 – January 19, 1993
- Lieutenant: Vacant
- Preceded by: Mike Castle
- Succeeded by: Tom Carper

22nd Lieutenant Governor of Delaware
- In office January 20, 1989 – December 31, 1992
- Governor: Mike Castle
- Preceded by: Shien Biau Woo
- Succeeded by: Ruth Minner

Personal details
- Born: Dale Edward Wolf; September 6, 1924 Kearney, Nebraska, U.S.
- Died: March 20, 2021 (aged 96) Wilmington, Delaware, U.S.
- Party: Republican
- Education: University of Nebraska (BA); Rutgers University, New Brunswick (MA, PhD)

Dale Edward Wolf (September 6, 1924 – March 20, 2021) was an American businessman and politician from Wilmington, in New Castle County, Delaware. He was a veteran of World War II and a member of the Republican Party, who served for three weeks as the 70th governor of Delaware. As of 2025, he remains the most recent Republican governor of Delaware, and the most recent Republican lieutenant governor of the state.

== Early life and family ==
Wolf was born at Kearney, Nebraska, the son of Harry and Irene Wolf. He graduated from the University of Nebraska–Lincoln, with a degree in agriculture. During World War II, he served as a first lieutenant in the United States Army, earning a Bronze Star Medal and Purple Heart at the Battle of Okinawa. He married Clarice Elaine Marshall in 1945 and they have four children, Janet, Glenda, Thomas, and James.

== Professional and political career ==
After the war, Wolf received his Ph.D. in agriculture from Rutgers University and soon took a position with the agriculture research division of DuPont. He became the chairman of the board of DuPont's Pharmaceutical Business and group vice president of the agriculture business. Meanwhile, he was at various times chairman of the National Agriculture Chemical Association (NACA), chairman of the International Agriculture Chemical Association (GIFAP), and a member of the board of the Pharmaceutical Manufacturing Association (PMA). He retired from DuPont in 1987 to accept an appointment from Governor Michael N. Castle as state director of development, responsible for the capital budget, housing for the poor, tourism and economic development.

== Lieutenant Governor and Governor of Delaware ==
Wolf was incumbent governor Michael N. Castle's choice for lieutenant governor in 1988 and won election, defeating Democrat Gary E. Hindes, a Wall Street investment executive from New Castle County. He served one term from January 20, 1989, until December 31, 1992. Wolf chose not to run for governor in 1992 against the candidacy of Democrat Thomas R. Carper. When Governor Michael N. Castle resigned to take his new position in the United States House of Representatives, however, Wolf served as governor the remaining 20 days of Castle's second term. He was, to date, the last Republican governor of Delaware.

== Later career ==
Wolf later served as chairman of Daynel International, a consultant group that assists companies interested in doing business in China. He lived in Guangzhou, China in 1995, setting up an office for the law firm of Mezzullo-McCandlish, of which he was the senior international consultant. He was vice chairman of the board of directors of the Emerald BioAgriculture Corporation, an agriculture biotechnology company in Lansing, Michigan, and from 1998 on vice chairman of the WSFS Financial Corporation. He chaired the first Drug and Alcohol Abuse Coordinating Council for Delaware, and was the chairman of SURJ (Stand Up for what's Right and Just), an organization dedicated to improve the criminal justice system in Delaware.

== Election ==
Delaware General Assembly (sessions while Governor)
| Year | Assembly | Senate Majority | President pro tempore | House Majority | Speaker |
|---|---|---|---|---|---|
| 1993 | 136th | Democratic | Richard S. Cordrey | Republican | Terry R. Spence |

Public Offices
| Office | Type | Location | Began office | Ended office | notes |
|---|---|---|---|---|---|
| Lt. Governor | Executive | Dover | January 20, 1989 | December 31, 1992 | |
| Governor | Executive | Dover | December 31, 1992 | January 19, 1993 | |

Election results
| Year | Office | Election | Subject | Party | Votes | % | Opponent | Party | Votes | % |
|---|---|---|---|---|---|---|---|---|---|---|
| 1988 | Lt. Governor | General | Dale E. Wolf | Republican | 128,144 | 54% | Gary E. Hindes | Democratic | 111,240 | 46% |

Political offices
| Preceded by Shien Biau Woo | Lieutenant Governor of Delaware; 1989–1992 | Succeeded by Ruth Minner |
| Preceded by Michael Castle | Governor of Delaware; 1992–1993 | Succeeded by Tom Carper |
