= 1964 United States Senate election in Delaware =

- November 3, 1964
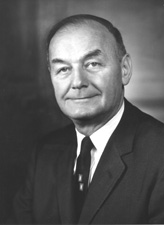

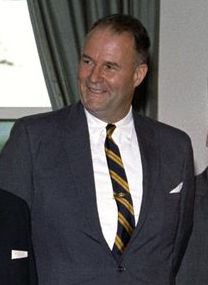
Nominee	John J. Williams	Elbert Carvel
Party	Republican	Democratic
Popular vote	103,782	96,850
Percentage	51.71%	48.26%
- County results Williams: 50–60%
U.S. senator before election
John J. Williams
Republican
Elected U.S. Senator
John J. Williams
Republican

The 1964 United States Senate election in Delaware took place on November 3, 1964. Incumbent Republican U.S. Senator John J. Williams was narrowly re-elected to a fourth term in office over then Democratic Governor Elbert Carvel in a rematch of the 1958 campaign.

== General election ==
=== Candidates ===
- Elbert Carvel, Governor of Delaware (Democratic)
- Joseph B. Hollon (Socialist Labor)
- John J. Williams, incumbent U.S. Senator (Republican)

=== Results ===
General election results
Party	Candidate	Votes	%	±%
Republican	John J. Williams (incumbent)	103,782	51.71%	▼1.57
Democratic	Elbert Carvel	96,850	48.26%	▲1.54
Socialist Labor	Joseph B. Hollon	71	0.04%	N/A
Total votes		200,703	100.00%	
Republican hold				

== See also ==
- 1964 United States Senate elections
