= 1964 United States Senate elections =

- November 3, 1964
- Class 1

35 (Note: Including both the concurrent special and regular elections in New Mexico and as well as two Class 2 special elections.) of the 100 seats in the United States Senate 51 seats needed for a majority
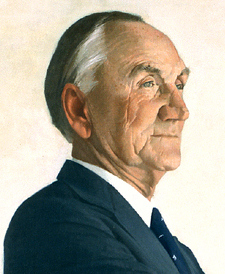

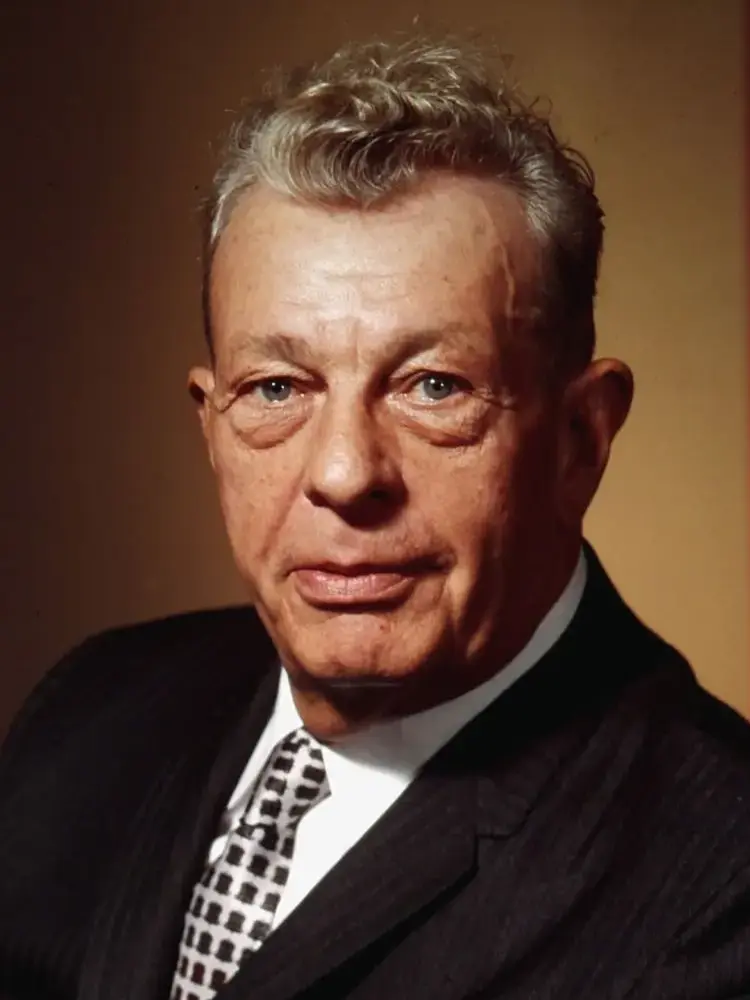
	Majority party	Minority party
Leader	Mike Mansfield	Everett Dirksen
Party	Democratic	Republican
Leader since	January 3, 1961	January 3, 1959
Leader's seat	Montana	Illinois
Seats before	66	34
Seats after	68	32
Seat change	▲2	▼2
Popular vote	30,786,035 (Note: The Liberal Party in New York endorsed Robert F. Kennedy, a Democrat, but the Clerk of the U.S. House of Representatives did not tabulate their votes, totaling 284,646, into the national Democratic total.)	23,171,991
Percentage	56.2%	42.3%
Seats up	26	9
Races won	28	7
- Results of the elections: Democratic gain Democratic hold Republican gain Republican hold No election Rectangular inset (Tennessee): both seats up for election
Majority Leader before election
Mike Mansfield
Democratic
Elected Majority Leader
Mike Mansfield
Democratic

The 1964 United States Senate elections were held on November 3. The 33 seats of Class 1 were contested in regular elections. Special elections were also held to fill vacancies. They coincided with the election of President Lyndon B. Johnson by an overwhelming majority, to a full term. His Democratic Party picked up a net two seats from the Republicans. As of 2026, this was the last time either party has had a two-thirds majority in the Senate, which allowed the Senate Democrats to override a veto, propose constitutional amendments, or convict and expel certain officials without any votes from Senate Republicans. The Senate election cycle coincided with Democratic gains in the House in the same year.

In a close race in Nevada, Democratic incumbent Howard Cannon won re-election over Republican Lieutenant Governor Paul Laxalt by fewer than 100 votes. Laxalt joined Cannon in the Senate when he won Nevada's other seat in 1974. Patrick V. McNamara (D–Michigan) later died on April 30, 1966, and was replaced on May 11, 1966, by appointee Robert P. Griffin (R), reducing Democrats' majority to 67–33.

Notably, of the 35 seats up for election this year, 26 were held by Democrats, who managed to retain 25 of them. A party defending two-thirds of the seats up for election would not make net gains in the Senate again until 2012. Coincidentally, it would be the same Senate class, class 1.

== Results summary ==
↓
68	32
Democratic	Republican

Parties				Total
Parties	Democratic	Republican	Other	Total
Last elections (1962)	67	33	0	100
Before these elections	66	34	0	100
Not up	40	25	0	65
Up	26	9	—	35
Class 1 (1958→1964)	24	9	—	33
Special: Class 2	2	0	—	2
Incumbent retired	1	1	—	2
Held by same party	1	1	—	2
Replaced by other party	0	0	—	0
Result	1	1	0	2
Incumbent ran	25	8	—	33
Won re-election	23	5	—	28
Lost re-election	▼3 Republicans replaced by ▲3 Democrats ▼1 Democrat replaced by ▲1 Republican		—	4
Lost renomination, but held by same party	1	0	—	1
Result	27	6	0	33
Total elected	28	7	0	35
Net gain/loss	▲2	▼2	Steady	2
Nationwide vote	30,786,035	23,171,991	848,082	54,806,108
Share	56.17%	42.28%	1.55%	100%
Result	68	32	0	100

== Gains, losses, and holds ==
=== Retirements ===
One Republican did not seek re-election and one Democrat did not seek election to finish an unexpired term.

State	Senator	Replaced by
Arizona	Barry Goldwater	Paul Fannin
Tennessee (special)	Herbert S. Walters	Ross Bass

=== Defeats ===
One Democrat sought election to finish the unexpired term but lost in the primary election. One Democrat sought election to a full term but lost in the general election. One Republican sought election to finish the unexpired term and sought election to a full term but lost in both the special election and the regular election. Two Republicans sought re-election but lost in the general election.

State	Senator	Replaced by
California	Pierre Salinger	George Murphy
Maryland	J. Glenn Beall	Joseph Tydings
New Mexico	Edwin L. Mechem	Joseph Montoya
New York	Kenneth Keating	Robert F. Kennedy
Oklahoma	J. Howard Edmondson	Fred R. Harris

=== Post-election changes ===
One Democrat died on April 30, 1966, and was replaced on May 11, 1966, by a Republican appointee. Another Democrat died on April 18, 1965, and was replaced by a fellow Democrat. Another Democrat resigned on November 10, 1965, for health reasons and was replaced by a fellow Democrat.

State	Senator	Replaced by
Michigan	Patrick V. McNamara	Robert P. Griffin
South Carolina	Olin D. Johnston	Donald S. Russell
Virginia	Harry F. Byrd	Harry F. Byrd Jr.

== Change in composition ==
=== Before the elections ===
D_{1}	D_{2}	D_{3}	D_{4}	D_{5}	D_{6}	D_{7}	D_{8}	D_{9}	D_{10}
D_{20}	D_{19}	D_{18}	D_{17}	D_{16}	D_{15}	D_{14}	D_{13}	D_{12}	D_{11}
D_{21}	D_{22}	D_{23}	D_{24}	D_{25}	D_{26}	D_{27}	D_{28}	D_{29}	D_{30}
D_{40}	D_{39}	D_{38}	D_{37}	D_{36}	D_{35}	D_{34}	D_{33}	D_{32}	D_{31}
D_{41} Calif. Ran	D_{42} Conn. Ran	D_{43} Fla. Ran	D_{44} Ind. Ran	D_{45} Maine; Ran	D_{46} Mass. Ran	D_{47} Mich. Ran	D_{48} Minn. Ran	D_{49} Miss. Ran	D_{50} Mo. Ran
Majority →									D_{51} Mont. Ran
D_{60} Texas; Ran	D_{59} Tenn. (sp); Retired	D_{58} Tenn. (reg); Ran	D_{57} R.I. Ran	D_{56} Okla. (sp); Ran	D_{55} Ohio; Ran	D_{54} N.D. Ran	D_{53} N.J. Ran	D_{52} Nev. Ran	D_{51} Mont. Ran
D_{61} Utah; Ran	D_{62} Va. Ran	D_{63} Wash. Ran	D_{64} W.Va. Ran	D_{65} Wis. Ran	D_{66} Wyo. Ran	R_{34} Vt. Ran	R_{33} Pa. Ran	R_{32} N.Y. Ran	R_{31} N.M. (sp); N.M. (reg); Ran
R_{21}	R_{22}	R_{23}	R_{24}	R_{25}	R_{26} Ariz. Retired	R_{27} Del. Ran	R_{28} Hawaii; Ran	R_{29} Md. Ran	R_{30} Neb. Ran
R_{20}	R_{19}	R_{18}	R_{17}	R_{16}	R_{15}	R_{14}	R_{13}	R_{12}	R_{11}
R_{1}	R_{2}	R_{3}	R_{4}	R_{5}	R_{6}	R_{7}	R_{8}	R_{9}	R_{10}

=== Elections results ===
D_{1}	D_{2}	D_{3}	D_{4}	D_{5}	D_{6}	D_{7}	D_{8}	D_{9}	D_{10}
D_{20}	D_{19}	D_{18}	D_{17}	D_{16}	D_{15}	D_{14}	D_{13}	D_{12}	D_{11}
D_{21}	D_{22}	D_{23}	D_{24}	D_{25}	D_{26}	D_{27}	D_{28}	D_{29}	D_{30}
D_{40}	D_{39}	D_{38}	D_{37}	D_{36}	D_{35}	D_{34}	D_{33}	D_{32}	D_{31}
D_{41} Conn. Re-elected	D_{42} Fla. Re-elected	D_{43} Ind. Re-elected	D_{44} Maine; Re-elected	D_{45} Mass. Re-elected	D_{46} Mich. Re-elected	D_{47} Minn. Re-elected	D_{48} Miss. Re-elected	D_{49} Mo. Re-elected	D_{50} Mont. Re-elected
Majority →									D_{51} Nev. Re-elected
D_{60} Utah; Re-elected	D_{59} Texas; Re-elected	D_{58} Tenn. (sp); Hold	D_{57} Tenn. (reg); Re-elected	D_{56} R.I. Re-elected	D_{55} Okla. (sp); Hold	D_{54} Ohio; Re-elected	D_{53} N.D. Re-elected	D_{52} N.J. Re-elected	D_{51} Nev. Re-elected
D_{61} Va. Re-elected	D_{62} Wash. Re-elected	D_{63} W.Va. Re-elected	D_{64} Wis. Re-elected	D_{65} Wyo. Re-elected	D_{66} Md. Gain	D_{67} N.M. (sp); N.M. (reg); Gain (Note: Appointee defeated)	D_{68} N.Y. Gain	R_{32} Calif. Gain	R_{31} Vt. Re-elected
R_{21}	R_{22}	R_{23}	R_{24}	R_{25}	R_{26} Ariz. Hold	R_{27} Del. Re-elected	R_{28} Hawaii; Re-elected	R_{29} Neb. Re-elected	R_{30} Pa. Re-elected
R_{20}	R_{19}	R_{18}	R_{17}	R_{16}	R_{15}	R_{14}	R_{13}	R_{12}	R_{11}
R_{1}	R_{2}	R_{3}	R_{4}	R_{5}	R_{6}	R_{7}	R_{8}	R_{9}	R_{10}

Key	D_{#} / Democratic; R_{#} / Republican

== Race summary ==
=== Special elections during the 88th Congress ===
In these special elections, the winner was seated during 1964 or before January 3, 1965; ordered by election date, then state.

State	Incumbent			Results	Candidates
State	Senator	Party	Electoral history	Results	Candidates
New Mexico (Class 1)	Edwin L. Mechem	Republican	1962 (Appointed)	Interim appointee lost election. New senator elected. Democratic gain. Winner also elected to the next term, see below.	▌ ✓ Joseph Montoya (Democratic) 54.7%; ▌Edwin L. Mechem (Republican) 45.3%
Oklahoma (Class 2)	J. Howard Edmondson	Democratic	1963 (Appointed)	Appointee lost nomination to finish term. New senator elected. Democratic hold.	▌ ✓ Fred R. Harris (Democratic) 51.2%; ▌Bud Wilkinson (Republican) 48.8%
Tennessee (Class 2)	Herbert S. Walters	Democratic	1963 (Appointed)	Appointee retired. New senator elected. Democratic hold.	▌ ✓ Ross Bass (Democratic) 52.1%; ▌Howard Baker (Republican) 47.4%

=== Elections leading to the next Congress ===
In these general elections, the winners were elected for the term beginning January 3, 1965; ordered by state.

All of the elections involved the Class 1 seats.

State	Incumbent			Results	Candidates
State	Senator	Party	Electoral history	Results	Candidates
Arizona	Barry Goldwater	Republican	1952; 1958	Incumbent retired to run for President of the United States. New senator elected. Republican hold.	▌ ✓ Paul Fannin (Republican) 51.4%; ▌Roy Elson (Democratic) 48.6%
California	Pierre Salinger	Democratic	1964 (Appointed)	Interim appointee lost election. New senator elected. Republican gain. Incumbent resigned December 31, 1964, to give successor preferential seniority. Winner seated January 1, 1965.	▌ ✓ George Murphy (Republican) 51.5%; ▌Pierre Salinger (Democratic) 48.5%
Connecticut	Thomas J. Dodd	Democratic	1958	Incumbent re-elected.	▌ ✓ Thomas J. Dodd (Democratic) 64.6%; ▌John Davis Lodge (Republican) 35.3%
Delaware	John J. Williams	Republican	1946; 1952; 1958	Incumbent re-elected.	▌ ✓ John J. Williams (Republican) 51.7%; ▌Elbert N. Carvel (Democratic) 48.3%; ▌Hollon (Socialist Labor) 0.03%
Florida	Spessard Holland	Democratic	1946 (Appointed); 1946; 1952; 1958	Incumbent re-elected.	▌ ✓ Spessard Holland (Democratic) 63.9%; ▌Claude R. Kirk Jr. (Republican) 36.0%
Hawaii	Hiram Fong	Republican	1959	Incumbent re-elected.	▌ ✓ Hiram Fong (Republican) 53.0%; ▌Thomas Gill (Democratic) 46.4%; ▌Lawrence Domine (Independent) 0.6%
Indiana	Vance Hartke	Democratic	1958	Incumbent re-elected.	▌ ✓ Vance Hartke (Democratic) 54.3%; ▌D. Russell Bontrager (Republican) 45.3%; Others: ▌J. Ralston Miller (Prohibition) 0.3%; ▌Casimer Kanczuzewski (Socialist Labor) 0.06%
Maine	Edmund Muskie	Democratic	1958	Incumbent re-elected.	▌ ✓ Edmund Muskie (Democratic) 66.6%; ▌Clifford McIntire (Republican) 33.4%
Maryland	J. Glenn Beall	Republican	1952; 1958	Incumbent lost re-election. New senator elected. Democratic gain.	▌ ✓ Joseph Tydings (Democratic) 62.8%; ▌J. Glenn Beall (Republican) 37.2%
Massachusetts	Ted Kennedy	Democratic	1962 (special)	Incumbent re-elected.	▌ ✓ Ted Kennedy (Democratic) 74.3%; ▌Howard J. Whitmore Jr. (Republican) 25.4%; Others: ▌Lawrence Gilfedder (Socialist Labor) 0.2%; ▌Grace F. Luder (Prohibition) 0.1%
Michigan	Philip Hart	Democratic	1958	Incumbent re-elected.	▌ ✓ Philip Hart (Democratic) 64.4%; ▌Elly M. Peterson (Republican) 35.3%; Others: ▌Ernest C. Smith (Freedom Now) 0.1%; ▌Evelyn Sell (Socialist Workers) 0.09%; ▌James Sim (Socialist Labor) 0.05%
Minnesota	Eugene McCarthy	DFL (Note: The Minnesota Democratic–Farmer–Labor Party is affiliated nationally with the Democratic Party (United States).)	1958	Incumbent re-elected.	▌ ✓ Eugene McCarthy (DFL) 60.3%; ▌Wheelock Whitney Jr. (Republican) 39.3%; Others: ▌William Braatz (Industrial Government) 0.3%; ▌Everett E. Luoma (Socialist Workers) 0.1%
Mississippi	John C. Stennis	Democratic	1947 (special); 1952; 1958	Incumbent re-elected.	▌ ✓ John C. Stennis (Democratic); Unopposed
Missouri	Stuart Symington	Democratic	1952; 1958	Incumbent re-elected.	▌ ✓ Stuart Symington (Democratic) 66.6%; ▌Jean P. Bradshaw (Republican) 33.4%
Montana	Mike Mansfield	Democratic	1952; 1958	Incumbent re-elected.	▌ ✓ Mike Mansfield (Democratic) 64.5%; ▌Alex Blewett (Republican) 35.5%
Nebraska	Roman Hruska	Republican	1954 (special); 1958	Incumbent re-elected.	▌ ✓ Roman Hruska (Republican) 61.4%; ▌Raymond W. Arndt (Democratic) 38.6%
Nevada	Howard Cannon	Democratic	1958	Incumbent re-elected.	▌ ✓ Howard Cannon (Democratic) 50.0%; ▌Paul Laxalt (Republican) 50.0%
New Jersey	Harrison A. Williams	Democratic	1958	Incumbent re-elected.	▌ ✓ Harrison A. Williams (Democratic) 61.9%; ▌Bernard M. Shanley (Republican) 37.3%
New Mexico	Edwin L. Mechem	Republican	1962 (Appointed)	Interim appointee lost election. New senator elected. Democratic gain. Winner was also elected to finish the term, see above.	▌ ✓ Joseph Montoya (Democratic) 54.7%; ▌Edwin L. Mechem (Republican) 45.3%
New York	Kenneth Keating	Republican	1958	Incumbent lost re-election. New senator elected. Democratic gain.	▌ ✓ Robert F. Kennedy (Democratic) 53.5%; ▌Kenneth Keating (Republican) 43.4%
North Dakota	Quentin Burdick	Democratic-NPL	1960 (special)	Incumbent re-elected.	▌ ✓ Quentin Burdick (Democratic-NPL) 57.6%; ▌Thomas S. Kleppe (Republican) 42.4%
Ohio	Stephen M. Young	Democratic	1958	Incumbent re-elected.	▌ ✓ Stephen M. Young (Democratic) 50.2%; ▌Robert Taft Jr. (Republican) 49.8%
Pennsylvania	Hugh Scott	Republican	1958	Incumbent re-elected.	▌ ✓ Hugh Scott (Republican) 50.6%; ▌Genevieve Blatt (Democratic) 49.1%
Rhode Island	John Pastore	Democratic	1950 (special); 1952; 1958	Incumbent re-elected.	▌ ✓ John Pastore (Democratic) 82.7%; ▌Ronald Rene Lagueux (Republican) 17.27%
Tennessee	Albert Gore Sr.	Democratic	1952; 1958	Incumbent re-elected.	▌ ✓ Albert Gore Sr. (Democratic) 53.6%; ▌Dan Kuykendall (Republican) 46.4%
Texas	Ralph Yarborough	Democratic	1957 (special); 1958	Incumbent re-elected.	▌ ✓ Ralph Yarborough (Democratic) 56.2%; ▌George H. W. Bush (Republican) 43.6%
Utah	Frank Moss	Democratic	1958	Incumbent re-elected.	▌ ✓ Frank Moss (Democratic) 57.3%; ▌Ernest L. Wilkinson (Republican) 42.7%
Vermont	Winston L. Prouty	Republican	1958	Incumbent re-elected.	▌ ✓ Winston L. Prouty (Republican) 53.5%; ▌Frederick J. Fayette (Democratic) 46.5%
Virginia	Harry F. Byrd	Democratic	1933 (Appointed); 1933 (special); 1934; 1940; 1946; 1952; 1958	Incumbent re-elected.	▌ ✓ Harry F. Byrd (Democratic) 63.8%; ▌Richard A. May (Republican) 19.0%; ▌James W. Respess (Independent) 10.3%
Washington	Henry M. Jackson	Democratic	1952; 1958	Incumbent re-elected.	▌ ✓ Henry M. Jackson (Democratic) 72.2%; ▌Lloyd J. Andrews (Republican) 27.8%
West Virginia	Robert Byrd	Democratic	1958	Incumbent re-elected.	▌ ✓ Robert Byrd (Democratic) 67.7%; ▌Cooper P. Benedict (Republican) 32.3%
Wisconsin	William Proxmire	Democratic	1957 (special); 1958	Incumbent re-elected.	▌ ✓ William Proxmire (Democratic) 53.3%; ▌Wilbur N. Renk (Republican) 46.6%
Wyoming	Gale W. McGee	Democratic	1958	Incumbent re-elected.	▌ ✓ Gale W. McGee (Democratic) 54.0%; ▌John S. Wold (Republican) 46.0%

== Closest races ==
Fifteen races had a margin of victory under 10%:

State	Party of winner	Margin
Nevada	Democratic	0.04%
Ohio	Democratic	0.4%
Pennsylvania	Republican	1.5%
Oklahoma (special)	Democratic	2.4%
Arizona	Republican	2.8%
California	Republican (flip)	3.4%
Delaware	Republican	2.4%
Tennessee (special)	Democratic	4.7%
Hawaii	Republican	6.6%
Wisconsin	Democratic	6.7%
Tennessee	Democratic	7.2%
Vermont	Republican	7.0%
Wyoming	Democratic	8.0%
Indiana	Democratic	9.0%
New Mexico	Democratic (flip)	9.4%

Michigan is the tipping point state with a margin of 29.1%.

== Arizona ==
1964 United States Senate election in Arizona
- November 3, 1964
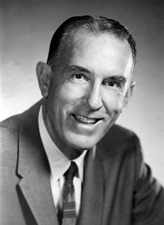

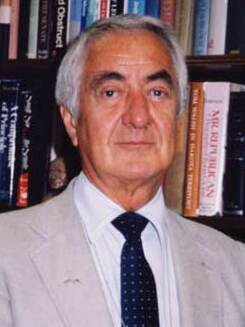
Nominee	Paul Fannin	Roy Elson
Party	Republican	Democratic
Popular vote	241,089	227,712
Percentage	51.43%	48.57%
- County results Fannin: 50–60% Elson: 50–60% 60–70% 70–80%
U.S. senator before election
Barry Goldwater
Republican
Elected U.S. Senator
Paul Fannin
Republican

Incumbent Barry Goldwater decided not to run for re-election to a third term, instead running for President of the United States as the Republican Party nominee against Lyndon B. Johnson. Governor of Arizona Paul Fannin ran unopposed in the Republican primary, and defeated Democratic nominee Roy Elson, who was a staff member for U.S. senator Carl Hayden until Hayden's retirement in 1969. Despite a landslide loss throughout the country, and Goldwater only able to obtain 50.45% of the vote in his home state of Arizona, Fannin managed to prevail in the state's Senate election. Goldwater would win the election for the other Senate seat in 1968 when Hayden retired from the post and serving two more terms.

Democratic primary results
Party	Candidate	Votes	%
Democratic	Roy Elson	76,697	41.41
Democratic	Renz L. Jennings	64,331	34.73
Democratic	Howard V. Peterson	22,424	12.11
Democratic	George Gavin	10,291	5.56
Democratic	Raymond G. Neely	6,022	3.25
Democratic	Robert P. Ketterer	5,460	2.95
Total votes		185,225	100.00

1964 United States Senate election in Arizona
Party	Candidate	Votes	%
Republican	Paul Fannin	241,089	51.43
Democratic	Roy Elson	227,712	48.57
Majority		13,377	2.86
Turnout		468,801	
Republican hold			

== California ==
1964 United States Senate election in California
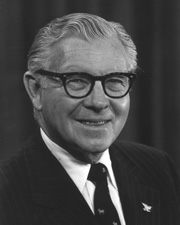

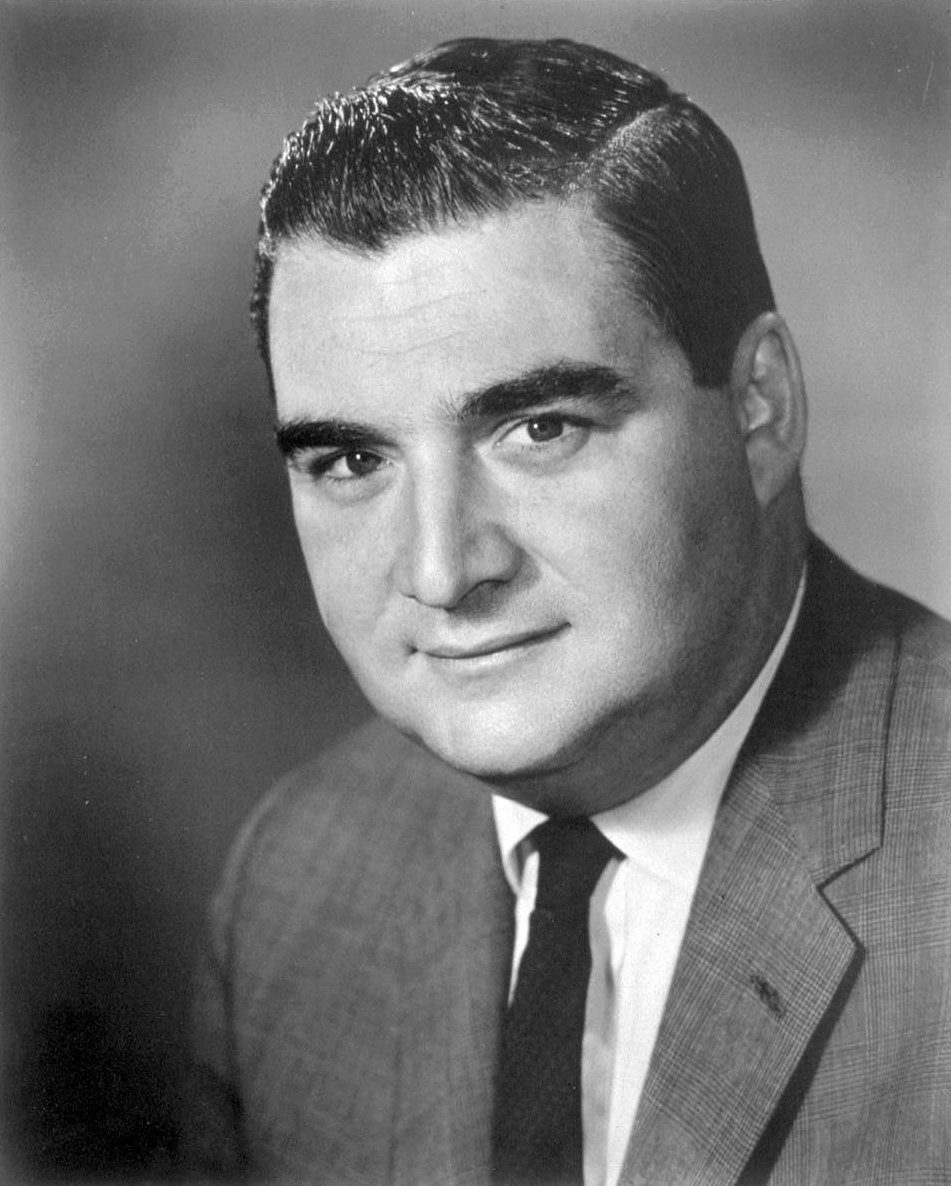
Nominee	George Murphy	Pierre Salinger
Party	Republican	Democratic
Popular vote	3,628,552	3,411,915
Percentage	51.54%	48.46%
- County Results Murphy: 50–60% 60–70% 70–80% Salinger: 50–60% 60–70%
U.S. senator before election
Pierre Salinger
Democratic
Elected U.S. Senator
George Murphy
Republican

Democratic incumbent Pierre Salinger, who had been appointed to the seat following the death of Senator Clair Engle three months earlier, was defeated in his bid for a full term by Republican candidate George Murphy, a retired actor.

1964 United States Senate election in California
Party	Candidate	Votes	%
Republican	George Murphy	3,628,552	51.54
Democratic	Pierre Salinger (Incumbent)	3,411,915	48.46
Majority		216,537	3.08
Turnout		7,040,467	
Republican gain from Democratic			

== Connecticut ==
1964 United States Senate election in Connecticut
- November 3, 1964
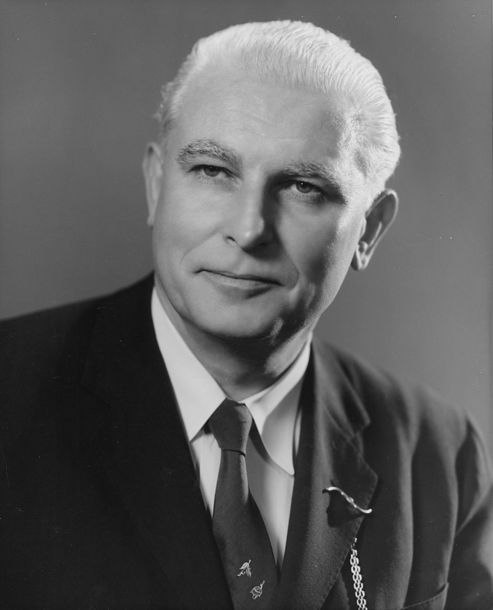

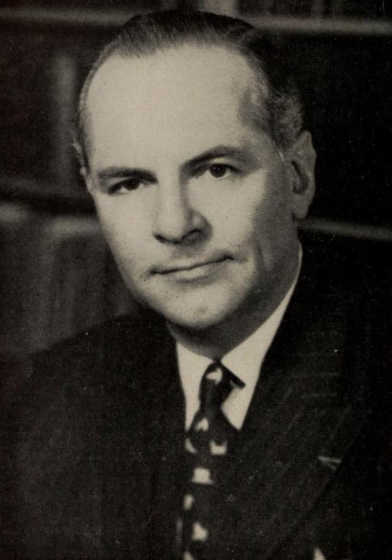
Nominee	Thomas J. Dodd	John Davis Lodge
Party	Democratic	Republican
Popular vote	781,008	426,939
Percentage	64.66%	35.34%
- County results Dodd: 50–60% 60–70% 70–80% 80–90% Lodge: 50–60% 60–70%
U.S. senator before election
Thomas J. Dodd
Democratic
Elected U.S. Senator
Thomas J. Dodd
Democratic

Democrat Thomas J. Dodd was re-elected and served a second term. John Davis Lodge, grandson of Henry Cabot Lodge was defeated by almost 30%.

1964 United States Senate election in Connecticut
Party	Candidate	Votes	%	±%
Democratic	Thomas J. Dodd (Incumbent)	781,008	64.66	
Republican	John Davis Lodge	426,939	35.34	
Majority		354,069	29.32	
Turnout		1,207,947		
Democratic hold				

== Delaware ==
1964 United States Senate election in Delaware
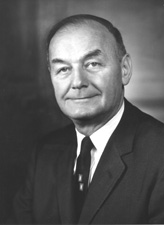

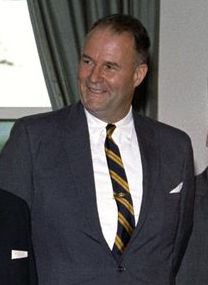
Nominee	John J. Williams	Elbert Carvel
Party	Republican	Democratic
Popular vote	103,782	96,850
Percentage	51.71%	48.26%
- County results Williams: 50-60%
U.S. senator before election
John J. Williams
Republican
Elected U.S. Senator
John J. Williams
Republican

Republican incumbent John J. Williams was reelected to a fourth term, defeating Democratic Governor Elbert N. Carvel.

1964 United States Senate election in Delaware
Party	Candidate	Votes	%
Republican	John J. Williams (Incumbent)	103,782	51.71
Democratic	Elbert N. Carvel	96,850	48.26
Socialist Labor	Joseph B. Hollon Sr.	71	0.04
Majority		6,932	3.45
Turnout		200,703	
Republican hold			

== Florida ==
1964 United States Senate election in Florida
- November 3, 1964
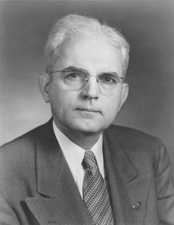

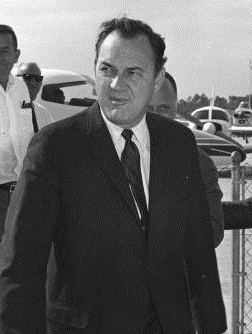
Nominee	Spessard Holland	Claude R. Kirk Jr.
Party	Democratic	Republican
Popular vote	997,585	562,212
Percentage	63.93%	36.03%
- County results Holland: 50–60% 60–70% 70–80% 80–90% Kirk: 50–60%
U.S. senator before election
Spessard Holland
Democratic
Elected U.S. Senator
Spessard Holland
Democratic

Democratic incumbent Spessard Holland was reelected to a fourth term in a landslide, defeating the Republican candidate, future governor Claude R. Kirk Jr.

1964 United States Senate election in Florida
Party	Candidate	Votes	%
Democratic	Spessard L. Holland (Incumbent)	997,585	63.93
Republican	Claude R. Kirk Jr.	562,212	36.03
None	Scattering	540	0.03
Majority		435,373	27.90
Turnout		1,560,337	
Democratic hold			

== Hawaii ==
1964 United States Senate election in Hawaii
- November 3, 1964
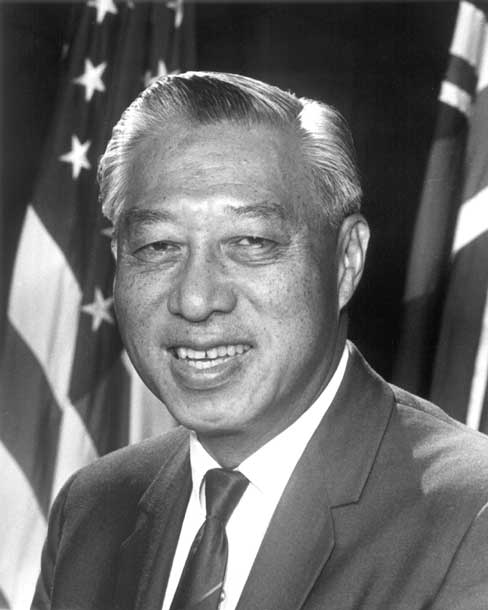

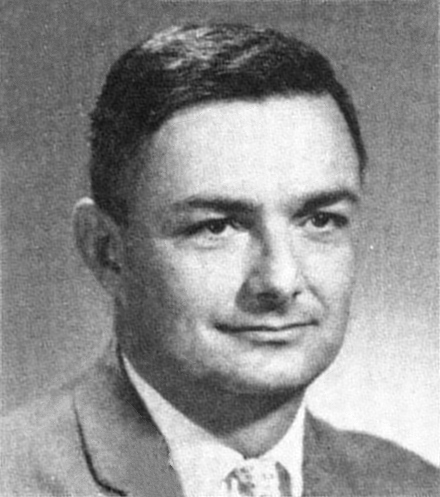
Nominee	Hiram Fong	Thomas Gill
Party	Republican	Democratic
Popular vote	110,747	96,789
Percentage	53.0%	46.4%
- County results Fong: 50–60% Gill: 40–50%
U.S. senator before election
Hiram Fong
Republican
Elected U.S. Senator
Hiram Fong
Republican

Republican incumbent Hiram Fong was reelected to a second term, defeating Democratic Congressman Thomas Gill

1964 United States Senate election in Hawaii
Party	Candidate	Votes	%
Republican	Hiram Fong (Incumbent)	110,747	53.04
Democratic	Thomas P. Gill	96,789	46.35
Independent	Lawrence Domine	1,278	0.61
Majority		3,958	6.69
Turnout		208,814	
Republican hold			

== Indiana ==
1964 United States Senate election in Indiana
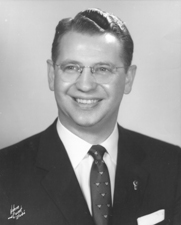

Nominee	Vance Hartke	D. Russell Bontrager
Party	Democratic	Republican
Popular vote	1,128,505	941,519
Percentage	54.33%	45.33%
- County results Hartke: 50–60% 60–70% Bontrager: 40-50% 50–60% 60–70%
U.S. senator before election
Vance Hartke
Democratic
Elected U.S. Senator
Vance Hartke
Democratic

Democratic incumbent Vance Hartke was reelected to a second term, defeating Republican State Senator Russell Bontrager.

1964 United States Senate election in Indiana
Party	Candidate	Votes	%
Democratic	Vance Hartke (Incumbent)	1,128,505	54.33
Republican	D. Russell Bontrager	941,519	45.33
Prohibition	J. Ralston Miller	5,708	0.27
Socialist Labor	Casimer Kanczuzewski	1,231	0.06
Majority		187,986	9.00
Turnout		2,076,963	
Democratic hold			

== Maine ==
1964 United States Senate election in Maine
- November 3, 1964
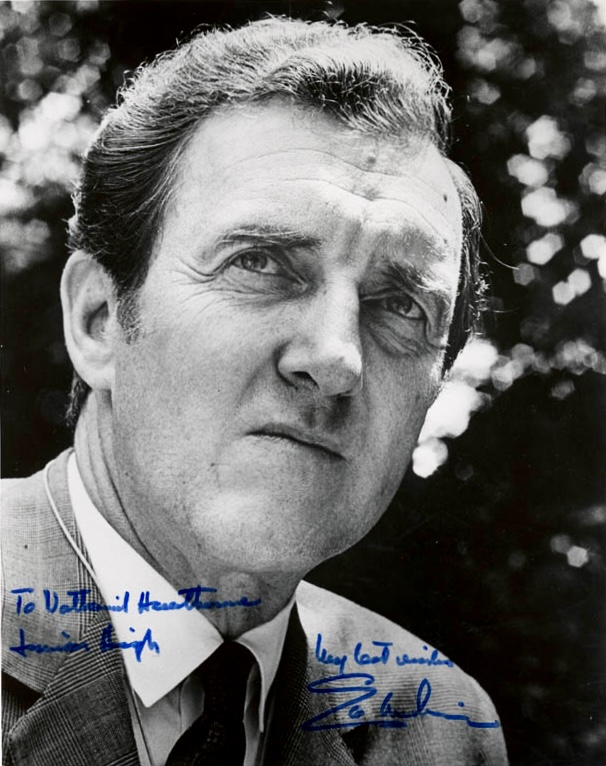

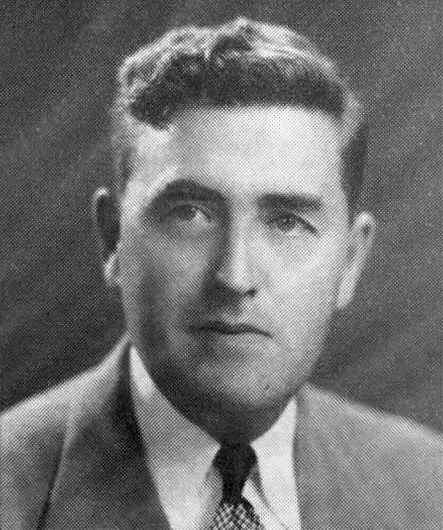
Nominee	Edmund Muskie	Clifford McIntire
Party	Democratic	Republican
Popular vote	253,511	127,040
Percentage	66.62%	33.38%
- County results Muskie: 50–60% 60–70% 70–80% McIntire: 50–60%
U.S. senator before election
Edmund Muskie
Democratic
Elected U.S. Senator
Edmund Muskie
Democratic

Democratic incumbent Edmund Muskie was reelected to a second term, defeating Republican Congressman Clifford McIntire in a landslide.

1964 United States Senate election in Maine
Party	Candidate	Votes	%
Democratic	Edmund S. Muskie (Incumbent)	253,511	66.62
Republican	Clifford McIntire	127,040	33.38
Majority		126,471	33.24
Turnout		380,551	
Democratic hold			

== Maryland ==
1964 United States Senate election in Maryland
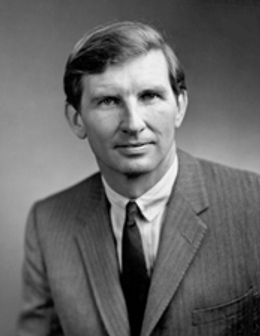

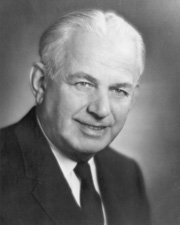
Nominee	Joseph Tydings	J. Glenn Beall
Party	Democratic	Republican
Popular vote	678,649	402,393
Percentage	62.78%	37.22%
- County results Tydings: 50–60% 60–70% 70–80% Beall: 50-60% 60-70%
U.S. senator before election
J. Glenn Beall
Republican
Elected U.S. Senator
Joseph Tydings
Democratic

Republican incumbent J. Glenn Beall was defeated in his bid for a third term by Democratic candidate Joseph Tydings, the former United States Attorney for the District of Maryland and son of former Senator Millard Tydings.

Beall's own son, J. Glenn Beall Jr., would go on to defeat Tydings six years later.

1964 United States Senate election in Maryland
Party	Candidate	Votes	%
Democratic	Joseph Tydings	678,649	62.78
Republican	J. Glenn Beall (Incumbent)	402,393	37.22
None	Write-Ins	7	0.00
Majority		276,256	25.56
Turnout		1,081,049	
Democratic gain from Republican			

== Massachusetts ==
1964 United States Senate election in Massachusetts
- November 3, 1964
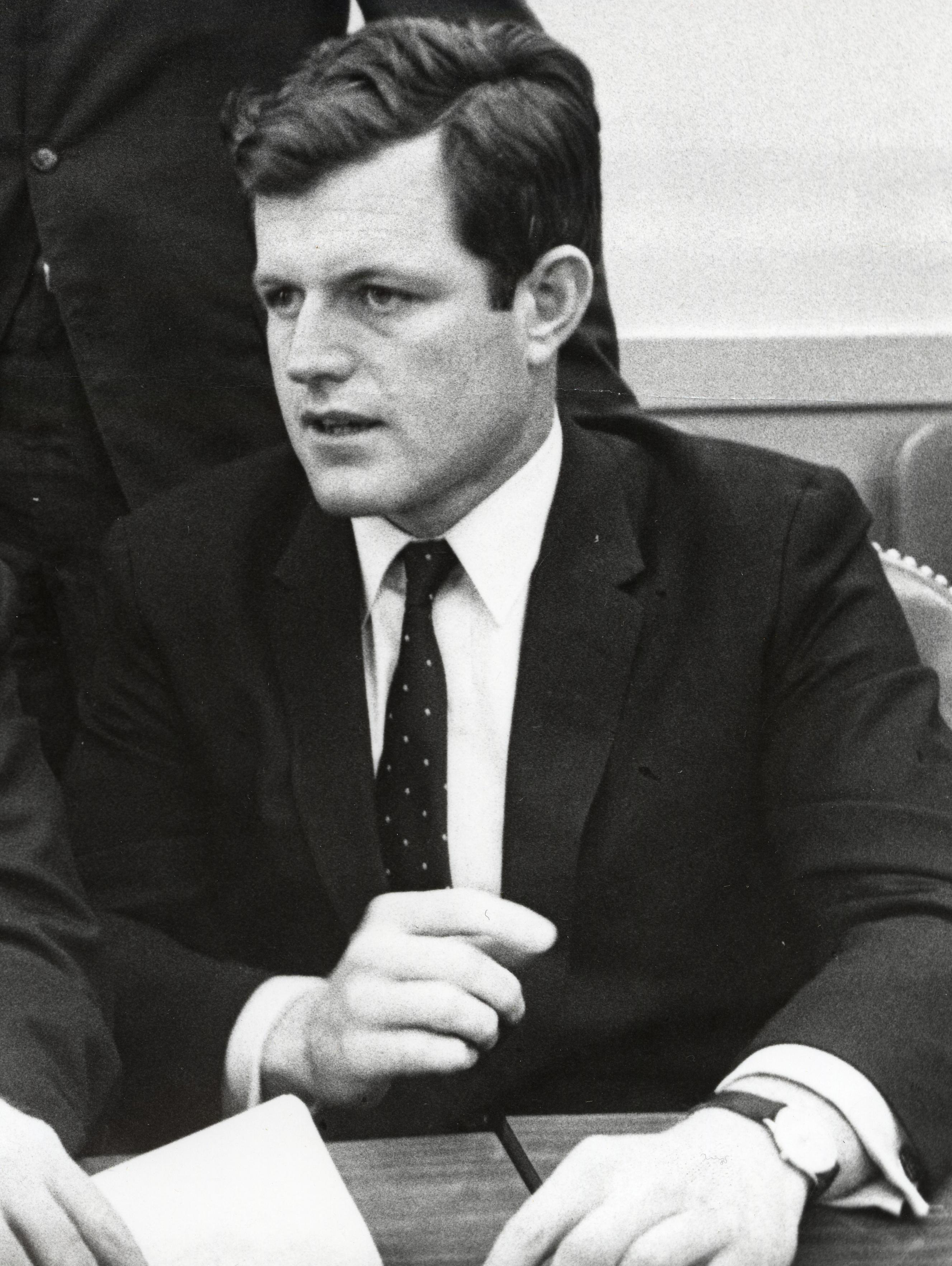

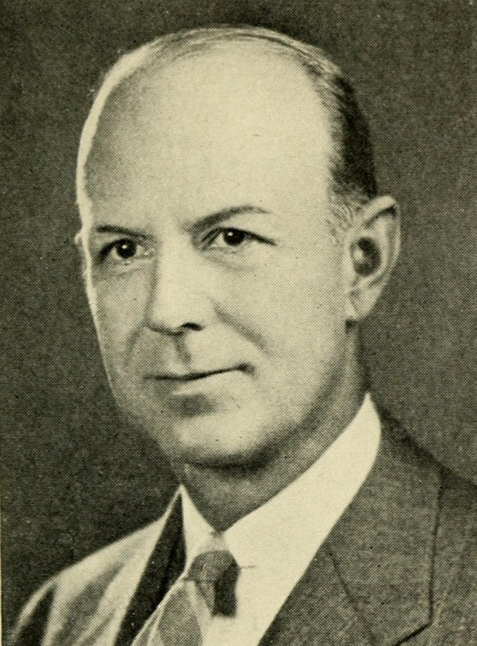
Nominee	Ted Kennedy	Howard J. Whitmore Jr.
Party	Democratic	Republican
Popular vote	1,716,907	587,663
Percentage	74.26%	25.42%

Kennedy
50–60%
60–70%
70–80%
80–90%
90–100%
Whitmore
40–50%
50–60%
60–70%
U.S. senator before election
Ted Kennedy
Democratic
Elected U.S. Senator
Ted Kennedy
Democratic

Incumbent Democrat Ted Kennedy, who had won a special election two years earlier, defeated his challengers to win his second (his first full) Senate term. Much of the campaign-appearance burden on behalf of Ted Kennedy fell on his wife, Joan, because of Ted's serious back injury in a plane crash.

Candidates:

- Ted Kennedy - Incumbent senator elected in 1962 to the unexpired term of John F. Kennedy.
- Howard J. Whitmore Jr. - Member of Massachusetts House of Representatives from 1947 to 1953, and mayor of Newton, Massachusetts, from 1954 to 1960. Served in the United States Army Air Forces in World War II.
- Lawrence Gilfedder - Candidate for Lt. Governor in 1948. Ran for Governor in 1952 and 1954. Ran for Senate in 1958, 1960, 1962, 1964, 1966, and 1970.
- Grace F. Luder - Candidate for Massachusetts's 9th congressional district seat in 1950 and Massachusetts's 14th congressional district seat in 1952.

General election
Party	Candidate	Votes	%	±%
Democratic	Edward M. Kennedy (Incumbent)	1,716,907	74.26	+21.3
Republican	Howard J. Whitmore Jr.	587,663	25.42	−19.08
Socialist Labor	Lawrence Gilfedder	4,745	0.21	−0.03
Prohibition	Grace F. Luder	2,700	0.12	+0.05
Majority		1,129,244	50.84	
Turnout		2,312,028		
Democratic hold		Swing		

== Michigan ==
1964 United States Senate election in Michigan
- November 3, 1964
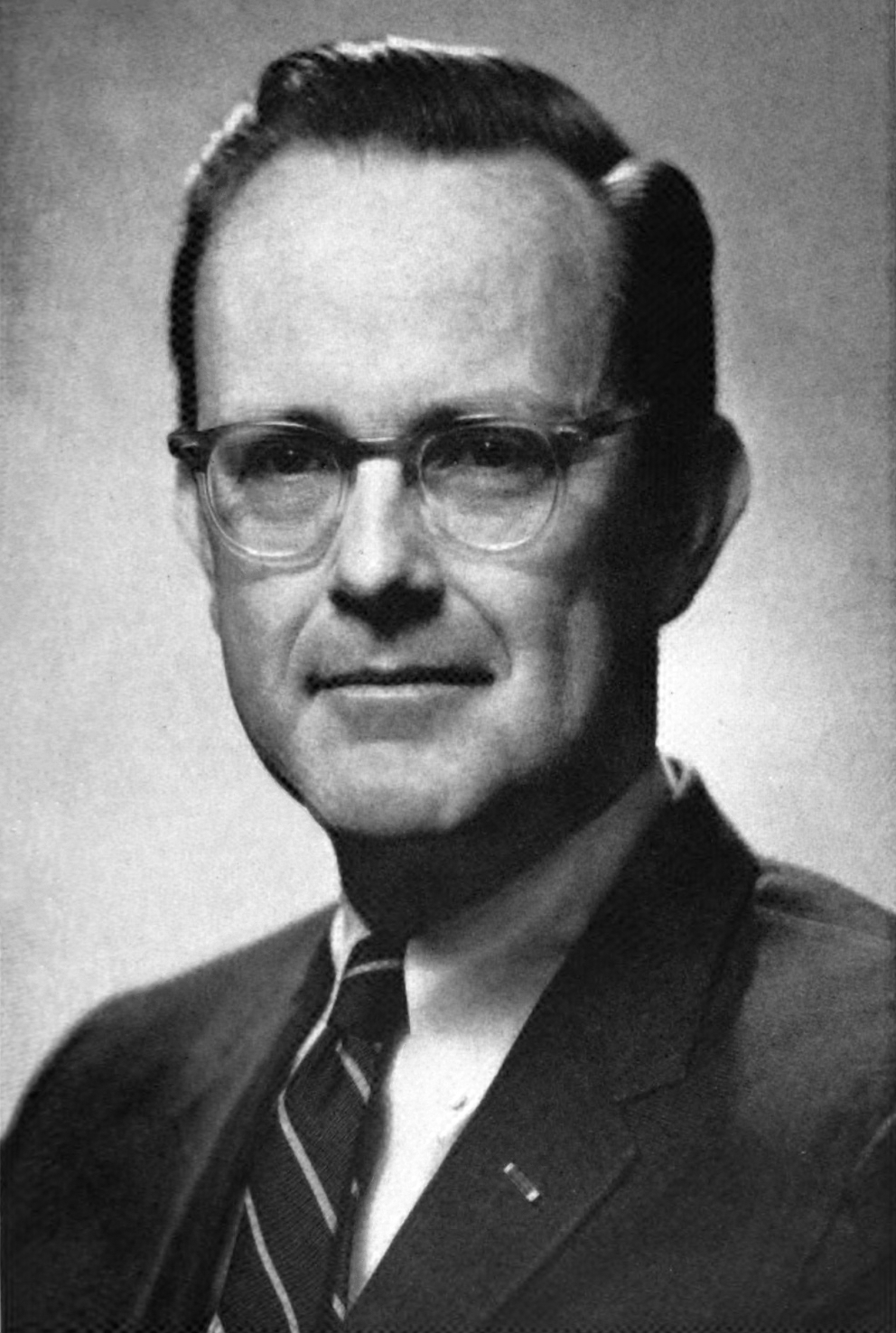

Nominee	Philip Hart	Elly Peterson
Party	Democratic	Republican
Popular vote	1,996,912	1,096,272
Percentage	64.38%	35.35%
- County results Hart: 50–60% 60–70% 70–80% Peterson: 50–60% 60–70%
U.S. senator before election
Philip Hart
Democratic
Elected U.S. Senator
Philip Hart
Democratic

Democratic incumbent Philip Hart was easily reelected to a second term over Republican challenger Elly M. Peterson.

1964 United States Senate election in Michigan
Party	Candidate	Votes	%
Democratic	Philip A. Hart (Incumbent)	1,996,912	64.38
Republican	Elly M. Peterson	1,096,272	35.34
Freedom Now	Ernest C. Smith	4,125	0.13
Socialist Workers	Evelyn Sell	2,754	0.09
Socialist Labor	James Sim	1,598	0.05
None	Scattering	6	0.00
Majority		90,640	29.04
Turnout		3,101,667	
Democratic hold			

== Minnesota ==
1964 United States Senate election in Minnesota
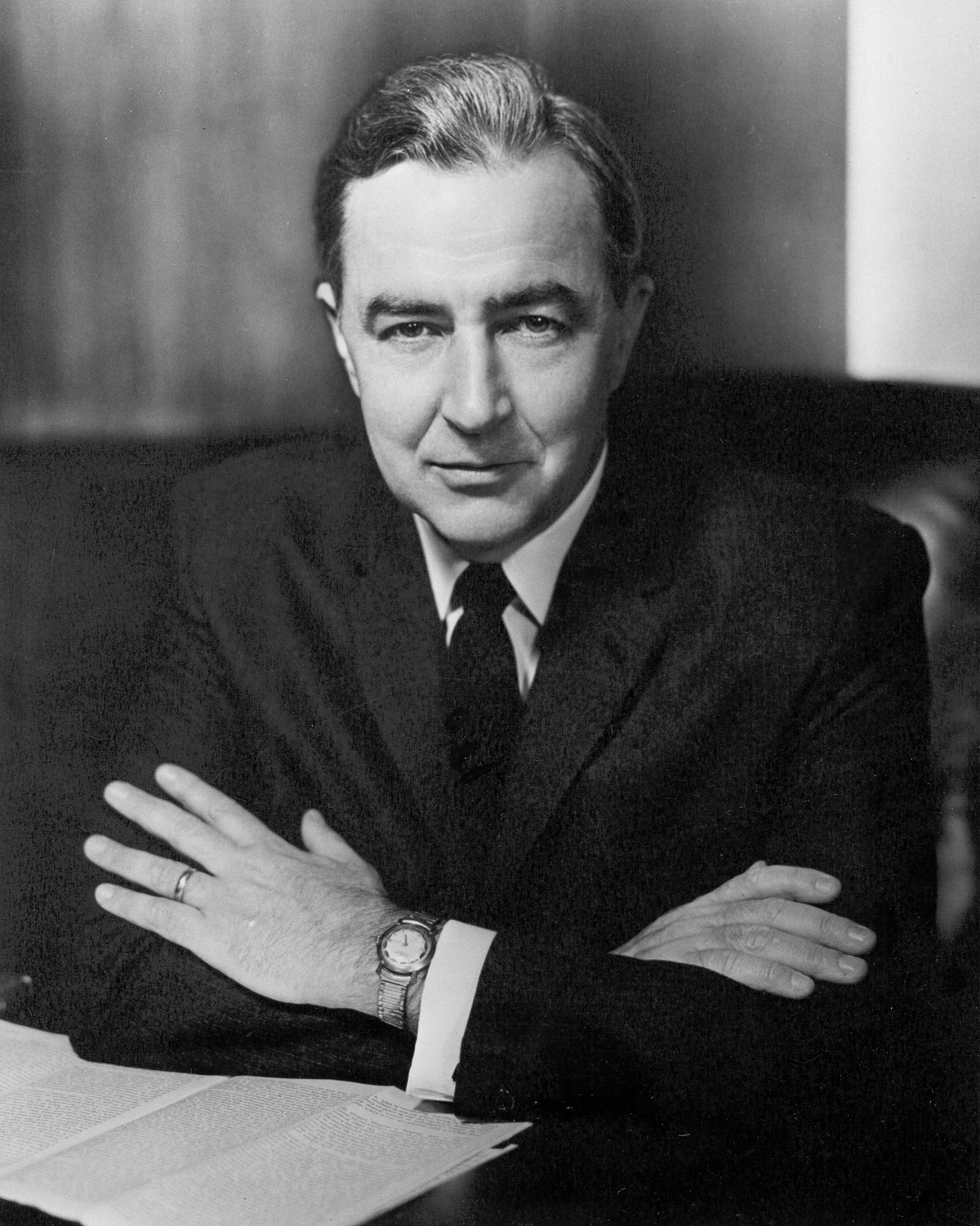

Nominee	Eugene McCarthy	Wheelock Whitney Jr.
Party	Democratic (DFL)	Republican
Popular vote	931,363	605,933
Percentage	60.34%	39.26%
- County results McCarthy: 40-50% 50–60% 60–70% 70–80% Whitney: 50-60%
U.S. senator before election
Eugene McCarthy
Democratic (DFL)
Elected U.S. senator
Eugene McCarthy
Democratic (DFL)

Incumbent Democrat Eugene McCarthy defeated Republican challenger Wheelock Whitney Jr. to win a second term.

Democratic primary election results
Party	Candidate	Votes	%
Democratic (DFL)	Eugene McCarthy (Incumbent)	245,068	90.47
Democratic (DFL)	R. H. Underdahl	14,562	5.38
Democratic (DFL)	Joseph Nowak	11,267	4.16

Republican primary election results
Party	Candidate	Votes	%
Republican	Wheelock Whitney Jr.	161,363	100.00

General election results
Party	Candidate	Votes	%
Democratic (DFL)	Eugene McCarthy (Incumbent)	931,363	60.34
Republican	Wheelock Whitney Jr.	605,933	39.26
Industrial Government	William Braatz	3,947	0.26
Socialist Workers	Everett E. Luoma	2,357	0.15
Majority		325,420	21.09
Turnout		1,543,590	
Democratic (DFL) hold			

== Mississippi ==
1964 U.S. Senate Democratic primary in Mississippi
- June 2, 1964
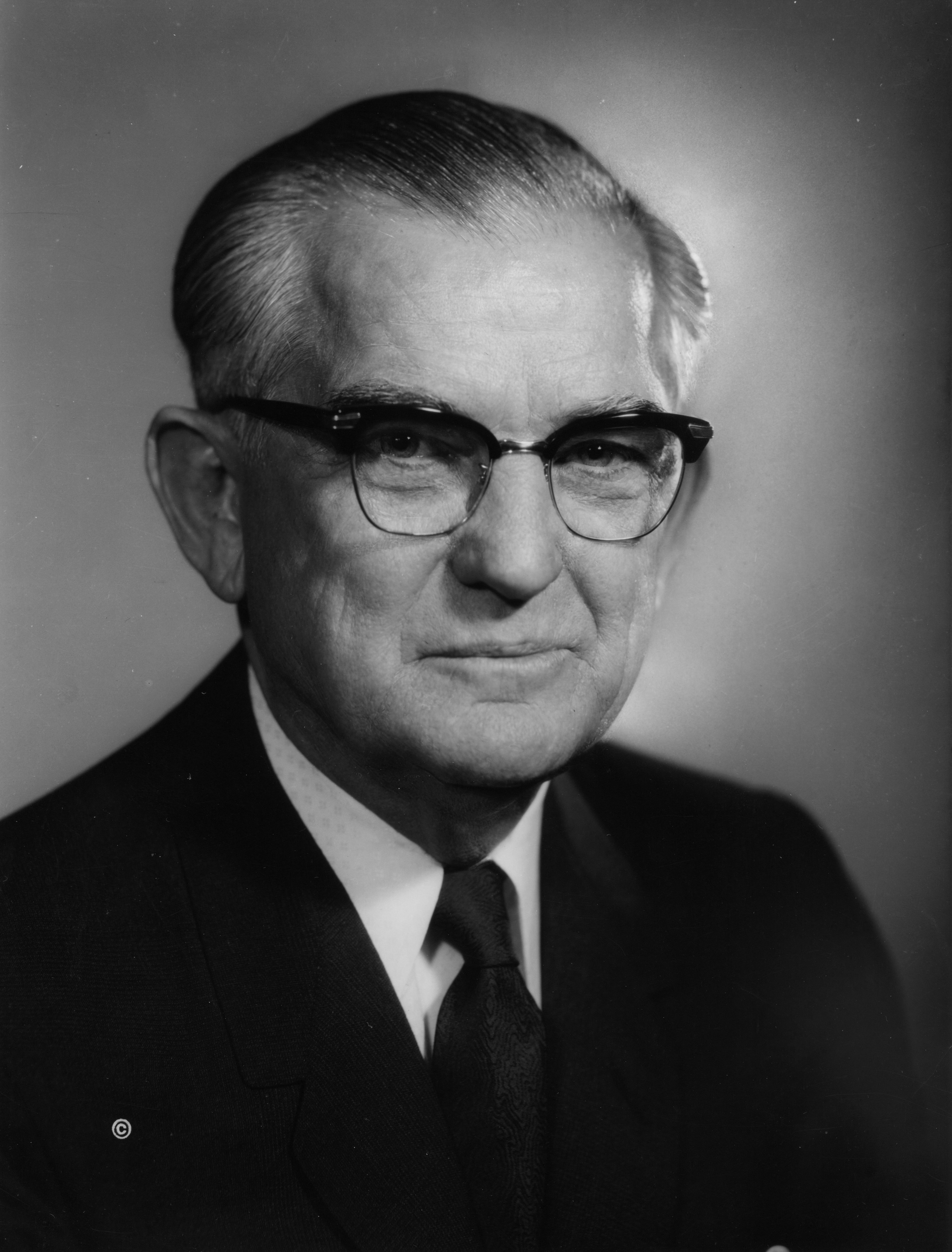

Nominee	John C. Stennis	Victoria Gray Adams
Party	Democratic	Democratic
Popular vote	173,764	4,703
Percentage	97.37%	2.64%
- County results Stennis: >90%
U.S. senator before election
John C. Stennis
Democratic
Elected U.S. Senator
John C. Stennis
Democratic

Democratic incumbent John C. Stennis was reelected virtually unopposed to a fourth term, even as Republican candidate Barry Goldwater carried Mississippi in the presidential election. Stennis received 97% of the vote in the Democratic primary and faced no Republican challenger in the general election.

1964 United States Senate election in Mississippi
Party	Candidate	Votes	%
Democratic	John C. Stennis (Incumbent)	343,364	100.00
Democratic hold			

== Missouri ==
1964 United States Senate election in Missouri
- November 3, 1964
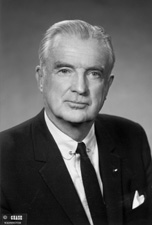

Nominee	Stuart Symington	Jean Paul Bradshaw
Party	Democratic	Republican
Popular vote	1,186,666	596,377
Percentage	66.55%	33.45%
- County results Symington: 50–60% 60–70% 70–80% 80–90% Bradshaw: 50-60% 60-70%
U.S. senator before election
Stuart Symington
Democratic
Elected U.S. Senator
Stuart Symington
Democratic

Democratic incumbent Stuart Symington was reelected to a third term in a landslide, defeating Republican candidate Jean Paul Bradshaw.

1964 United States Senate election in Missouri
Party	Candidate	Votes	%
Democratic	Stuart Symington (Incumbent)	1,186,666	66.55
Republican	Jean Paul Bradshaw	596,377	33.45
Majority		590,289	33.10
Turnout		1,783,043	
Democratic hold			

== Montana ==
1964 United States Senate election in Montana
- November 3, 1964
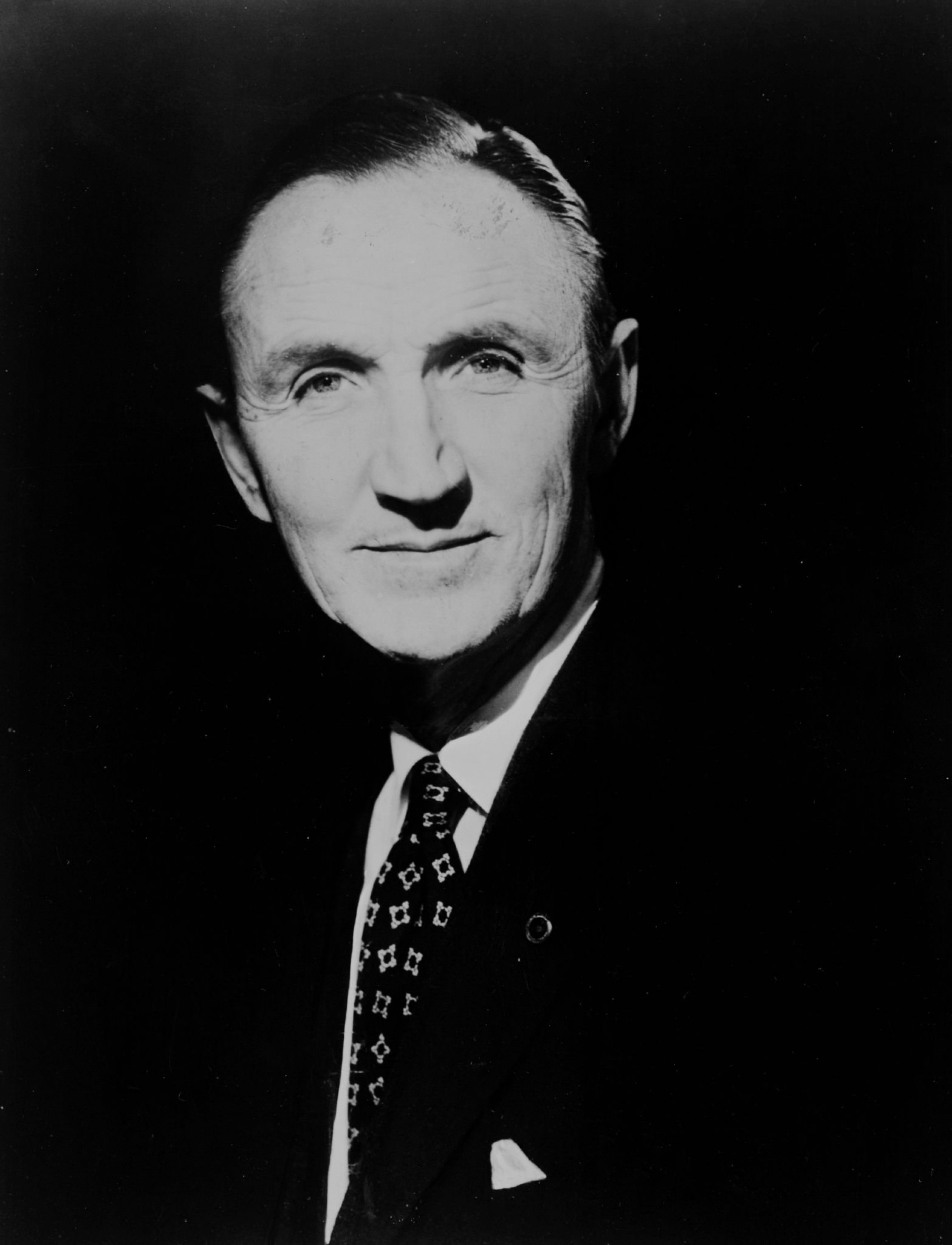

Nominee	Mike Mansfield	Alex Blewett
Party	Democratic	Republican
Popular vote	180,643	99,367
Percentage	64.51%	35.49%
- County results Mansfield: 50–60% 60–70% 70–80% Blewett: 50-60%
U.S. senator before election
Mike Mansfield
Democratic
Elected U.S. Senator
Mike Mansfield
Democratic

Incumbent Democrat Mike Mansfield, who was first elected to the Senate in 1952 and was re-elected in 1958, ran for re-election. Mansfield won the Democratic primary in a landslide, and advanced to the general election, where he faced Alex Blewett, the Majority Leader of the Montana House of Representatives and the Republican nominee. Though Mansfield's margin was significantly reduced from 1958, he still overwhelmingly defeated Blewett and won his third term in the Senate.

Democratic Party primary results
Party	Candidate	Votes	%
Democratic	Mike Mansfield (Incumbent)	109,904	85.51
Democratic	Joseph P. Monaghan	18,630	14.49
Total votes		128,534	100.00

Republican Primary results
Party	Candidate	Votes	%
Republican	Alex Blewett	31,934	59.37
Republican	Lyman Brewster	12,375	23.01
Republican	Antoinette F. Rosell	9,480	17.62
Total votes		53,789	100.00

1964 United States Senate election in Montana
Party	Candidate	Votes	%	±%
Democratic	Mike Mansfield (Incumbent)	180,643	64.51	−11.71%
Republican	Alex Blewett	99,367	35.49	+11.71%
Majority		81,276	29.03	−23.41%
Turnout		280,010		
Democratic hold		Swing		

== Nebraska ==
1964 United States Senate election in Nebraska
- November 3, 1964
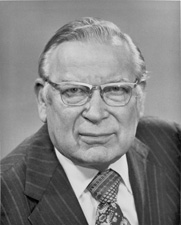

Nominee	Roman Hruska	Raymond W. Arndt
Party	Republican	Democratic
Popular vote	345,772	217,605
Percentage	61.37%	38.62%
- County results Hruska: 50–60% 60–70% 70–80% 80–90% Arndt: 50–60%
U.S. senator before election
Roman Hruska
Republican
Elected U.S. Senator
Roman Hruska
Republican

Republican incumbent Roman Hruska was reelected in a landslide over Democratic challenger Raymond Arndt.

1964 United States Senate election in Nebraska
Party	Candidate	Votes	%
Republican	Roman L. Hruska (Incumbent)	345,772	61.37
Democratic	Raymond W. Arndt	217,605	38.62
None	Scattering	24	0.00
Majority		128,167	22.75
Turnout		563,401	
Republican hold			

== Nevada ==
1964 United States Senate election in Nevada
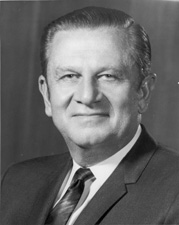

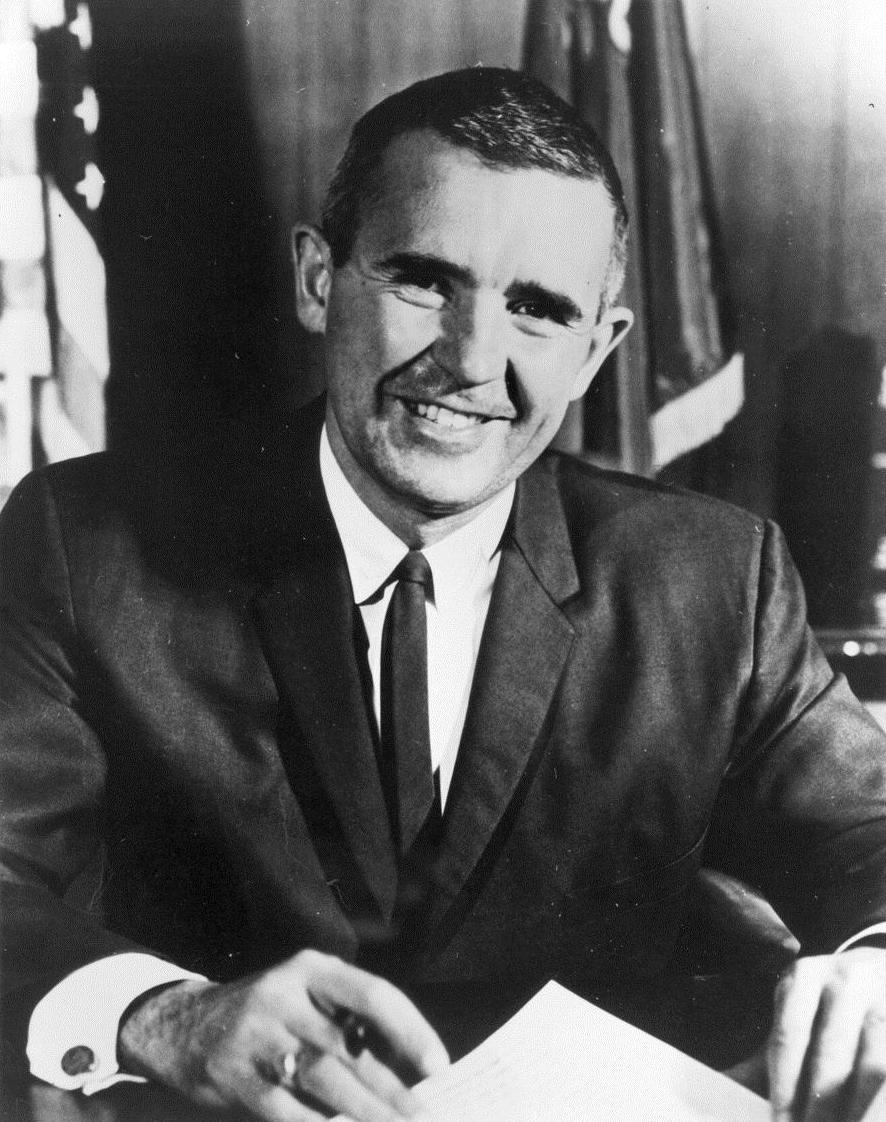
Nominee	Howard Cannon	Paul Laxalt
Party	Democratic	Republican
Popular vote	67,336	67,288
Percentage	50.02%	49.98%
- County results Cannon: 50–60% 60–70% Laxalt: 50–60% 60–70% 70–80%
U.S. senator before election
Howard Cannon
Democratic
Elected U.S. senator
Howard Cannon
Democratic

Incumbent Democratic U.S. Senator Howard Cannon won re-election to a second term by a razor-thin margin of only 48 votes over Republican Lieutenant Governor Paul Laxalt.

General election results
Party	Candidate	Votes	%	±%
Democratic	Howard Cannon (Incumbent)	67,336	50.02	−7.66
Republican	Paul Laxalt	67,288	49.98	+7.66
Majority		48	0.04	−15.32
Turnout		134,624		
Democratic hold		Swing		

== New Jersey ==
1964 United States Senate election in New Jersey
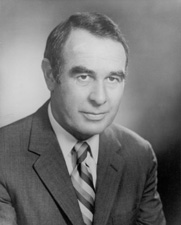

Nominee	Harrison A. Williams	Bernard M. Shanley
Party	Democratic	Republican
Popular vote	1,677,515	1,011,280
Percentage	61.91%	37.32%
- County results Williams: 50–60% 60–70% 70–80% Shanley: 50-60%
U.S. senator before election
Harrison A. Williams
Democratic
Elected U.S. Senator
Harrison A. Williams
Democratic

Democratic incumbent Harrison A. Williams was reelected to a second term over Republican candidate Bernard M. Shanley, a former white house staffer during the Eisenhower administration.

1964 United States Senate election in New Jersey
Party	Candidate	Votes	%
Democratic	Harrison A. Williams (Incumbent)	1,677,515	61.91
Republican	Bernard M. Shanley	1,011,280	37.32
Conservative	Harold P. Poeschel	7,582	0.28
Socialist Workers	Lawrence Stewart	6,147	0.23
America First	John Valgene Mahalchik	4,926	0.18
Socialist Labor	Albert Ronis	2,125	0.08
Majority		666,235	23.58
Turnout		2,709,575	
Democratic hold			

== New Mexico ==
=== New Mexico (regular) ===
1964 United States Senate election in New Mexico
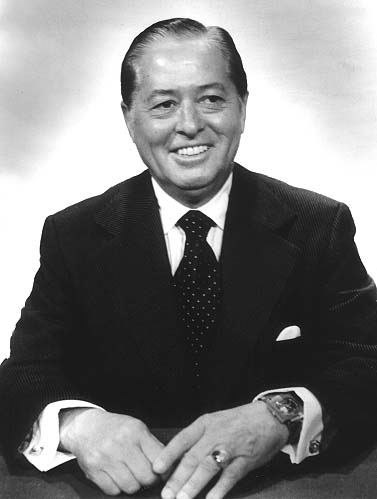

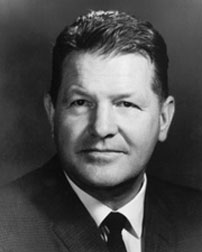
Nominee	Joseph Montoya	Edwin L. Mechem
Party	Democratic	Republican
Popular vote	178,209	147,562
Percentage	54.7%	45.3%
- County results Montoya: 50–60% 60–70% 70–80% Mechem: 50-60%
U.S. senator before election
Edwin L. Mechem
Republican
Elected U.S. senator
Joseph Montoya
Democratic

Incumbent Republican Edwin L. Mechem, who had been appointed to the seat following the death of Democrat Dennis Chávez two years earlier, sought election to a full term, but was defeated by Democrat Joseph Montoya.

Montoya was Lieutenant Governor of New Mexico (1947–1951 and 1955–1957) and a four-term member of the U.S. House of Representatives (1957–1964).

General election results
Party	Candidate	Votes	%
Democratic	Joseph Montoya	178,209	54.70
Republican	Edwin L. Mechem (Incumbent)	147,562	45.30
Majority		30,647	9.41
Total votes		325,771	100.00
Democratic gain from Republican			

=== New Mexico (special) ===
Montoya was also elected to finish the term ending January 3, 1965.

== New York ==
1964 United States Senate election in New York
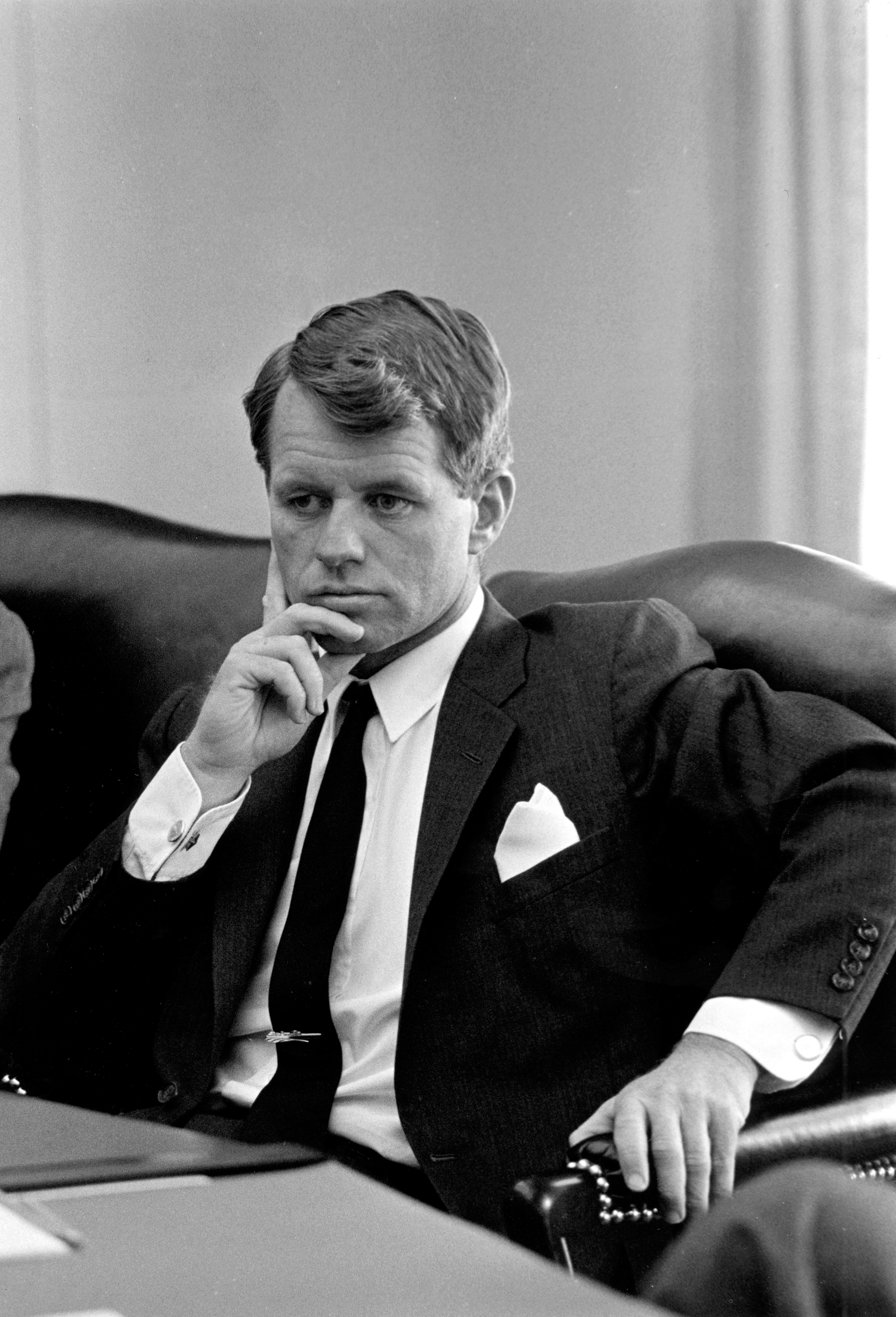

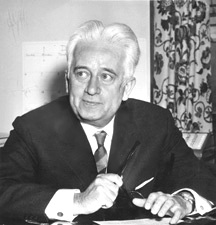
Nominee	Robert F. Kennedy	Kenneth Keating
Party	Democratic	Republican
Popular vote	3,823,749	3,104,056
Percentage	53.5%	43.4%
- County results Kennedy: 40–50% 50–60% 60–70% Keating: 40-50% 50-60% 60-70%
U.S. senator before election
Kenneth Keating
Republican
Elected U.S. senator
Robert F. Kennedy
Democratic

Incumbent Republican U.S. Senator Kenneth Keating ran for re-election to a second term, but was defeated by Robert F. Kennedy, the former United States Attorney General and brother of former President John F. Kennedy and Massachusetts Senator Ted Kennedy.

The Socialist Labor state convention met on March 29, and nominated John Emanuel. The Republican state convention met on August 31, and re-nominated the incumbent U.S. Senator Kenneth B. Keating. The Conservative state convention met on August 31 at Saratoga Springs, New York, and nominated Prof. Henry Paolucci. The Democratic state convention met on September 1, and nominated U.S. Attorney General Robert F. Kennedy on the first ballot, with 968 votes against 153 for Congressman Samuel S. Stratton. The Liberal Party met on September 1, and endorsed the Democratic nominee, U.S. Attorney General Robert F. Kennedy. The Socialist Workers Party filed a petition to nominate candidates on September 7. Richard Garza was nominated.

John English, a Nassau County leader who helped John F. Kennedy during the 1960 presidential election, encouraged Robert Kennedy to oppose Keating. At the time, Samuel S. Stratton, a member of the United States House of Representatives from New York's 35th congressional district, was considered the most likely Democratic candidate. At first, Kennedy resisted. After President Kennedy's assassination, Robert Kennedy remained as Attorney General for Lyndon B. Johnson. However, Johnson and Kennedy feuded. Kennedy decided to run for the Senate in New York in August, and resigned from the Cabinet on September 3, 1964. While many reform Democrats resisted Kennedy, support from Robert F. Wagner Jr., and party bosses like Charles A. Buckley, of The Bronx, and Peter J. Crotty, (Note: Peter J. Crotty (ca. 1910–1992), lawyer, of Buffalo, President of the Buffalo City Council 1948–1951.) of Buffalo, helped Kennedy win the nomination at the party convention.

During the campaign, Kennedy was frequently met by large crowds. Keating accused Kennedy of being a carpetbagger from Massachusetts. Kennedy responded to these charges in a televised town meeting by saying, "If the senator of the state of New York is going be selected on who's lived here the longest, then I think people are going vote for my opponent. If it's going be selected on who's got the best New York accent, then I think I'm probably out too. But I think if it's going be selected on the basis of who can make the best United States senator, I think I'm still in the contest."

The Democratic/Liberal candidate was elected. Campaign help from President Lyndon B. Johnson, as well as the Democratic landslide after the assassination of John F. Kennedy, helped carry Kennedy into office, as Kennedy polled about 1.1 million votes less in New York than Johnson did. The incumbent Keating was defeated.

1964 state election result
Ticket	U.S. Senator	
Democratic	✓ Robert F. Kennedy	3,539,746
Liberal	✓ Robert F Kennedy	284,646
Republican	Kenneth B. Keating	3,104,056
Conservative	Henry Paolucci (Note: Dr. Henry Paolucci (1921–1999), Professor of Comparative Literature and Ancient Greek and Roman History at Iona College, later Professor of Government and Politics at St. John's University.)	212,216
Socialist Labor	John Emanuel (Note: John Emanuel (b. ca. 1908 in Greece), "fur worker," ran also for Comptroller in 1954; and for Lieutenant Governor in 1958 and 1962)	7,358
Socialist Workers	Richard Garza (Note: Richard Garza (b. ca. 1928 The Bronx), "restaurant worker and seaman," ran also for Mayor of New York in 1961; and for Governor in 1962)	4,202

(For Total Votes, the Democratic and Liberal votes for Kennedy are combined.)

== North Dakota ==
1964 United States Senate election in North Dakota
- November 3, 1964
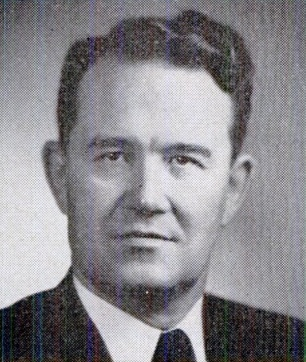

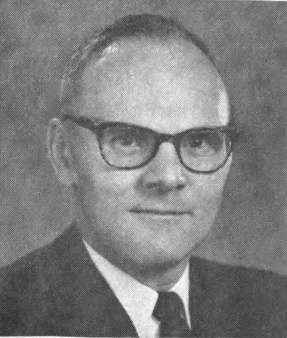
Nominee	Quentin Burdick	Thomas Kleppe
Party	Democratic–NPL	Republican
Popular vote	149,264	109,681
Percentage	57.64%	42.36%
County results
Burdick:
50-60%
60-70%
70-80%
Kleppe:
50-60%
60-70%
U.S. senator before election
Quentin Burdick
Democratic–NPL
Elected U.S. senator
Quentin Burdick
Democratic–NPL

Incumbent Democratic-NPL Senator Quentin Burdick sought and received re-election to his second term, defeating Republican candidate Thomas S. Kleppe, who later became the United States Secretary of the Interior.

Only Burdick filed as a Democratic-NPLer, and the endorsed Republican candidate was Thomas S. Kleppe, who would go on to serve two terms as a Representative for North Dakota's second congressional district from 1967 to 1971. Burdick and Kleppe won the primary elections for their respective parties.

1964 United States Senate election in North Dakota
Party	Candidate	Votes	%
Democratic–NPL	Quentin Burdick (Incumbent)	149,264	57.64
Republican	Thomas S. Kleppe	109,681	42.36
Turnout		219,560	

== Ohio ==
1964 United States Senate election in Ohio
- November 3, 1964
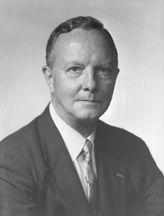

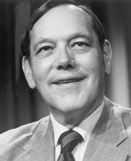
Nominee	Stephen M. Young	Robert Taft Jr.
Party	Democratic	Republican
Popular vote	1,923,608	1,906,781
Percentage	50.22%	49.78%
- County results Young: 50–60% 60–70% Taft: 50–60% 60–70%
U.S. senator before election
Stephen M. Young
Democratic
Elected U.S. Senator
Stephen M. Young
Democratic

Democratic incumbent Stephen M. Young narrowly won reelection to a second term over Republican Congressman Robert Taft Jr., the son of former Senator Robert A. Taft and grandson of former President William Howard Taft.

Taft would go on to win the seat in the next election, serving one term in the Senate.

1964 United States Senate election in Ohio
Party	Candidate	Votes	%
Democratic	Stephen M. Young (Incumbent)	1,923,608	50.22
Republican	Robert Taft Jr.	1,906,781	49.78
Majority		16,827	0.44
Turnout		3,830,389	
Democratic hold			

== Oklahoma (special) ==
1964 United States Senate special election in Oklahoma
- November 3, 1964
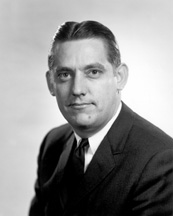

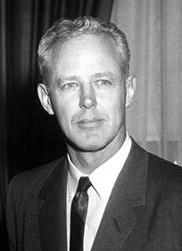
Nominee	Fred R. Harris	Bud Wilkinson
Party	Democratic	Republican
Popular vote	466,782	445,392
Percentage	51.17%	48.83%
- County results Harris: 50–60% 60–70% 70–80% Wilkinson: 50–60% 60–70%
U.S. senator before election
J. Howard Edmondson
Democratic
Elected U.S. Senator
Fred R. Harris
Democratic

This election was to determine who would serve for the final two years of the term to which Robert S. Kerr had been elected in 1960. Kerr had died in January 1963, and outgoing Governor J. Howard Edmondson was appointed to take his place. Edmondson hoped to win the special election, but lost the Democratic primary to former state senator Fred R. Harris, who then won the general election over University of Oklahoma football coach Bud Wilkinson.

1964 United States Senate special election in Oklahoma
Party	Candidate	Votes	%
Democratic	Fred R. Harris	466,782	51.17
Republican	Bud Wilkinson	445,392	48.83
Majority		21,390	3.34
Turnout		912,174	
Democratic hold			

== Pennsylvania ==
1964 United States Senate election in Pennsylvania
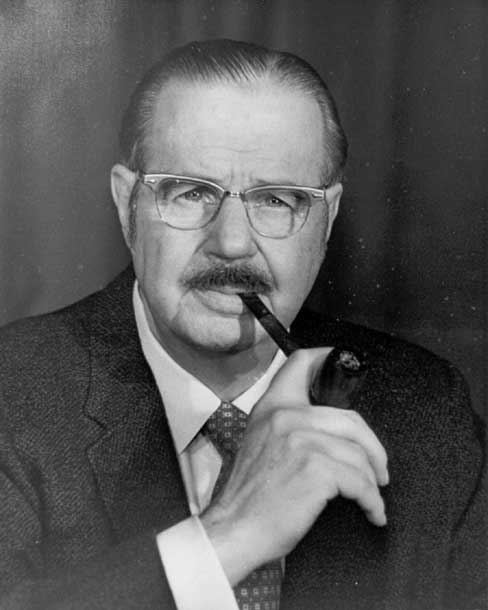
Nominee	Hugh Scott	Genevieve Blatt
Party	Republican	Democratic
Popular vote	2,429,858	2,359,223
Percentage	50.6%	49.1%
- County results Scott: 50-60% 60-70% 80–90% Blatt: 50–60%
U.S. senator before election
Hugh Scott
Republican
Elected U.S. senator
Hugh Scott
Republican

Incumbent Republican U.S. Senator Hugh Scott successfully sought re-election to a second term, defeating Democratic nominee Genevieve Blatt.

General election results
Party	Candidate	Votes	%	±%
Republican	Hugh Scott (Incumbent)	2,429,858	50.59	−0.62%
Democratic	Genevieve Blatt, Pennsylvania Secretary of Internal Affairs	2,359,223	49.12	+0.74%
Socialist Workers	Morris Chertov	7,317	0.15	+0.01%
Socialist Labor	George S. Taylor	6,881	0.14	−0.12%
N/A	Other	473	0.00	N/A
Majority		70,635	1.47	
Turnout		4,803,752		
Republican hold		Swing		

== Rhode Island ==
1964 United States Senate election in Rhode Island
- November 3, 1964
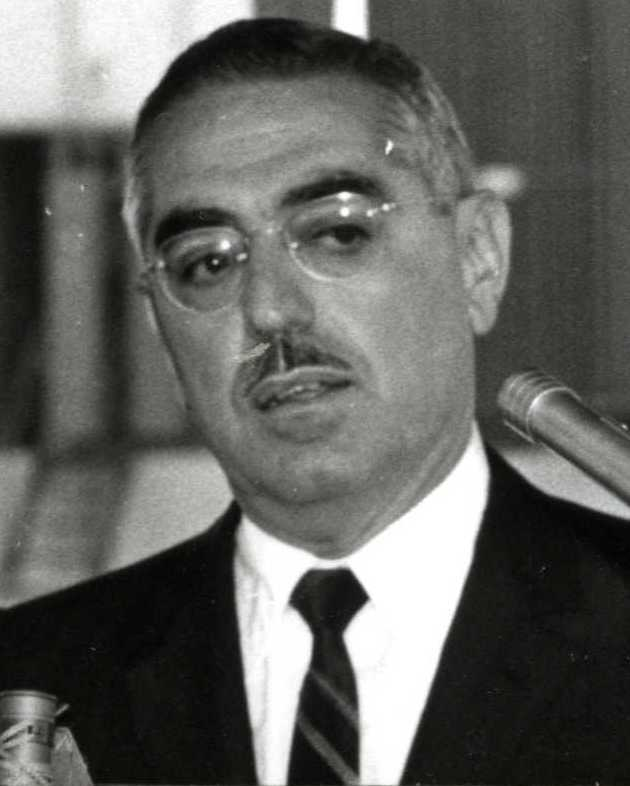

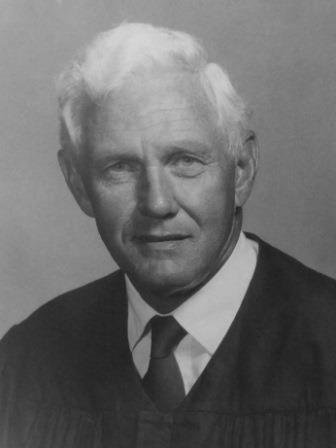
Nominee	John Pastore	Ronald Legueux
Party	Democratic	Republican
Popular vote	319,607	66,715
Percentage	82.73%	17.27%
- County results Pastore: 70–80% 80–90%
U.S. senator before election
John Pastore
Democratic
Elected U.S. Senator
John Pastore
Democratic

Democratic incumbent John Pastore won reelection to a third full term (and fourth overall), defeating Republican candidate Ronald Lagueux by more than 65 percentage points.

1964 United States Senate election in Rhode Island
Party	Candidate	Votes	%
Democratic	John Pastore (Incumbent)	319,607	82.73
Republican	Ronald Legueux	66,715	17.27
Majority		252,892	65.45
Turnout		386,322	
Democratic hold			

== Tennessee ==
=== Tennessee (regular) ===
1964 United States Senate election in Tennessee
- November 3, 1964
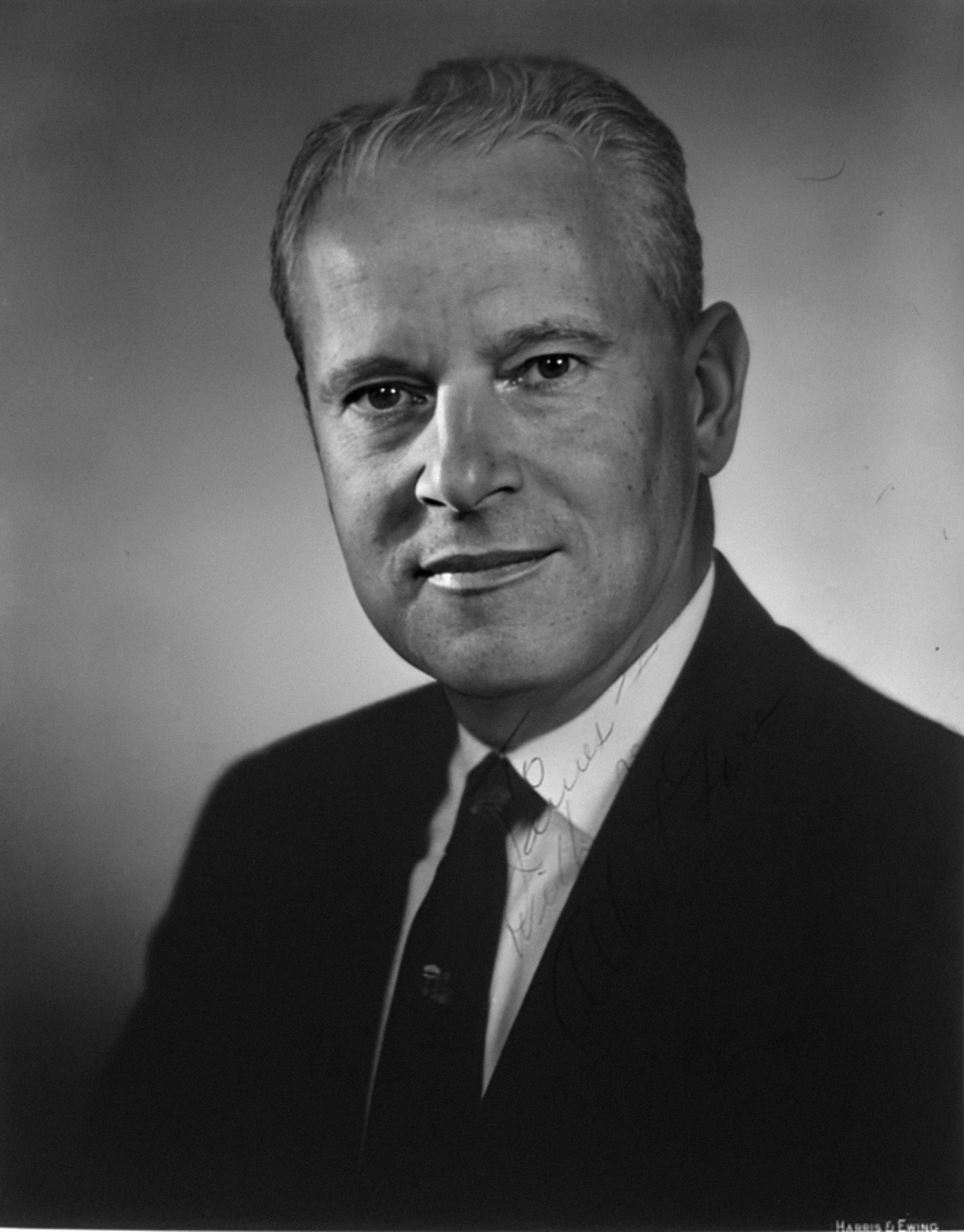

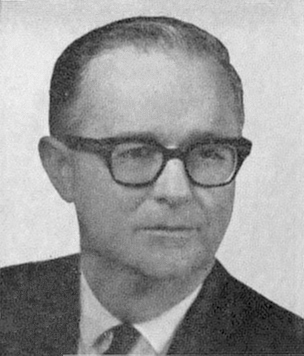
Nominee	Albert Gore Sr.	Dan Kuykendall
Party	Democratic	Republican
Popular vote	570,542	493,475
Percentage	53.62%	46.38%
- County results Gore: 50–60% 60–70% 70–80% 80–90% Kuykendall: 50–60% 60–70% 70–80%
U.S. senator before election
Albert Gore Sr.
Democratic
Elected U.S. senator
Albert Gore Sr.
Democratic

Incumbent Democrat Albert Gore Sr. was re-elected to a third term over Republican candidate Dan Kuykendall.

General election results
Party	Candidate	Votes	%
Democratic	Albert Gore Sr. (incumbent)	570,542	53.62
Republican	Dan Kuykendall	493,475	46.38
Majority		77,067	7.24
Turnout		1,064,017	
Democratic hold			

=== Tennessee (special) ===
1964 United States Senate special election in Tennessee
- November 3, 1964
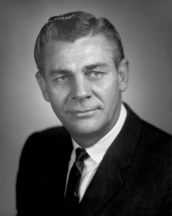

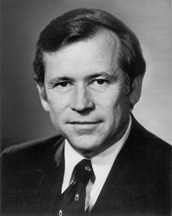
Nominee	Ross Bass	Howard Baker
Party	Democratic	Republican
Popular vote	568,905	517,330
Percentage	52.14%	47.41%
- County results Bass: 50–60% 60–70% 70–80% 80–90% Baker: 50–60% 60–70% 70–80% 80–90%
U.S. senator before election
Herbert S. Walters
Democratic
Elected U.S. senator
Ross Bass
Democratic

Democratic Congressman Ross Bass won the special election to serve the remaining 26 months of the term to which the late Estes Kefauver had been elected in 1960. He defeated Republican candidate Howard Baker, who would go on to win the seat in the regular election two years later.

General election results
Party	Candidate	Votes	%
Democratic	Ross Bass	568,905	52.14
Republican	Howard Baker	517,330	47.41
Independent	Melvin Babcock Morgan	4,853	0.44
Majority		51,575	4.73
Turnout		1,091,088	
Democratic hold			

== Texas ==
1964 United States Senate election in Texas
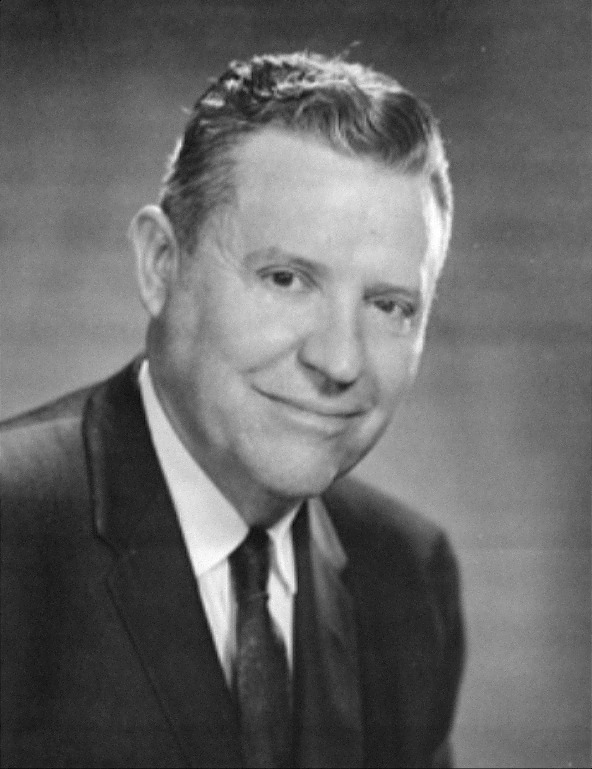

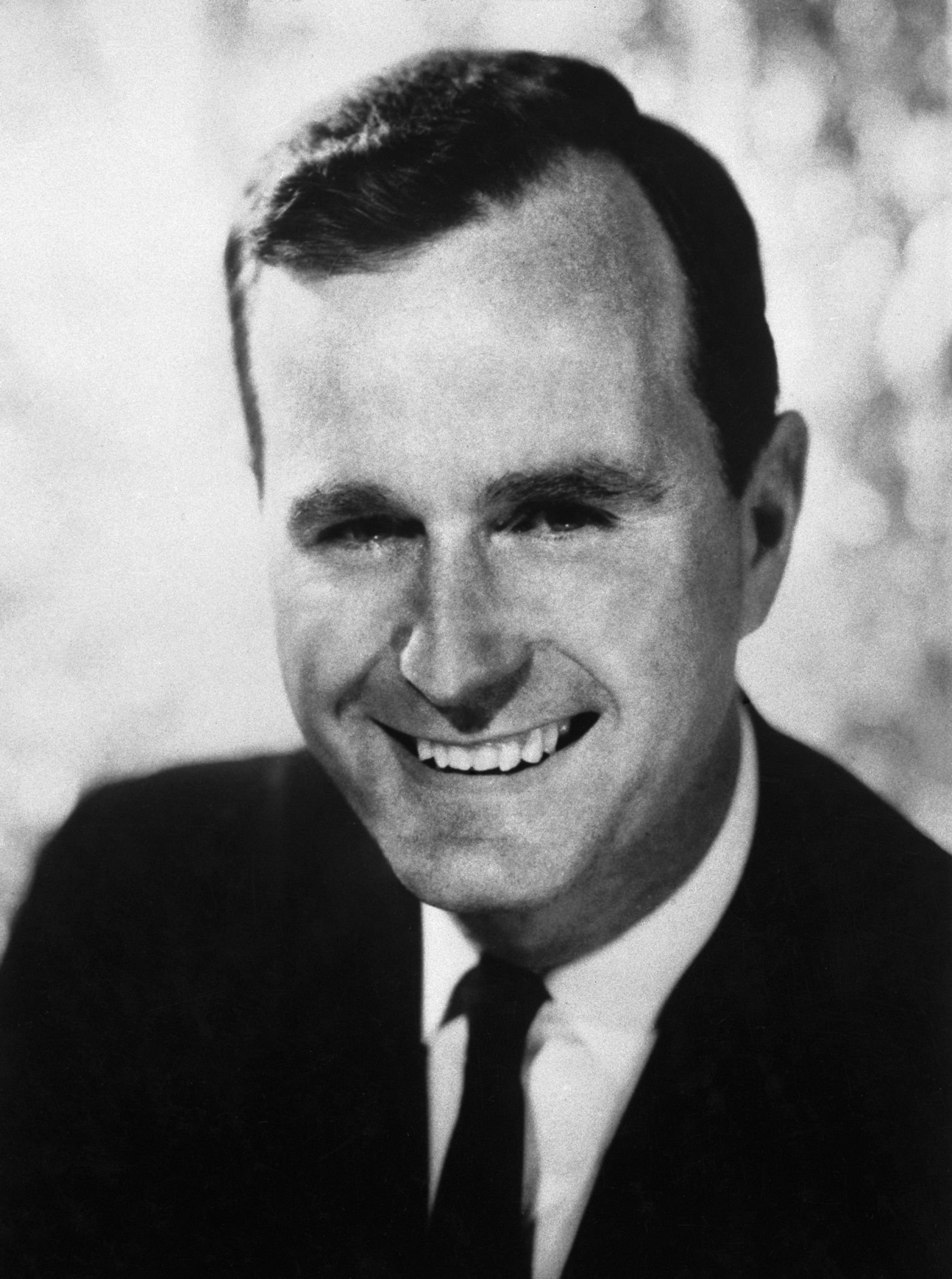
Nominee	Ralph Yarborough	George H. W. Bush
Party	Democratic	Republican
Popular vote	1,463,958	1,134,337
Percentage	56.2%	43.6%
- County results Yarbrough: 40–50% 50–60% 60–70% 70–80% 80–90% 90–100% Bush: 50–60% 60–70%
U.S. senator before election
Ralph Yarborough
Democratic
Elected U.S. senator
Ralph Yarborough
Democratic

Incumbent Democrat Ralph Yarborough defeated future President of the United States George H. W. Bush.

Although Yarborough won this election, he would lose the Democratic Primary six years later, in 1970, to Lloyd Bentsen. Bush later went on to win an election for the United States House of Representatives in 1966; he was elected vice president of the United States in 1980 and was elected president in 1988.

1964 United States Senate election in Texas
Party	Candidate	Votes	%
Democratic	Ralph W. Yarborough (Incumbent)	1,463,958	56.22
Republican	George H. W. Bush	1,134,337	43.56
Constitution	Jack Carswell	5,542	0.21
Majority		329,621	12.66
Turnout		2,603,837	
Democratic hold			

== Utah ==
1964 United States Senate election in Utah
- November 3, 1964
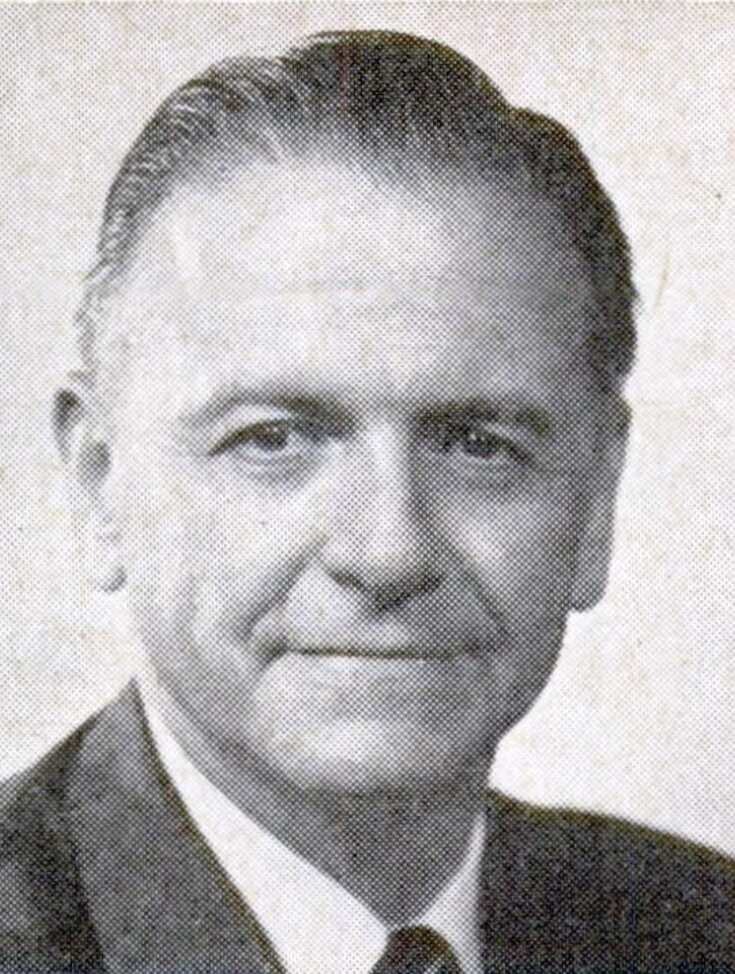

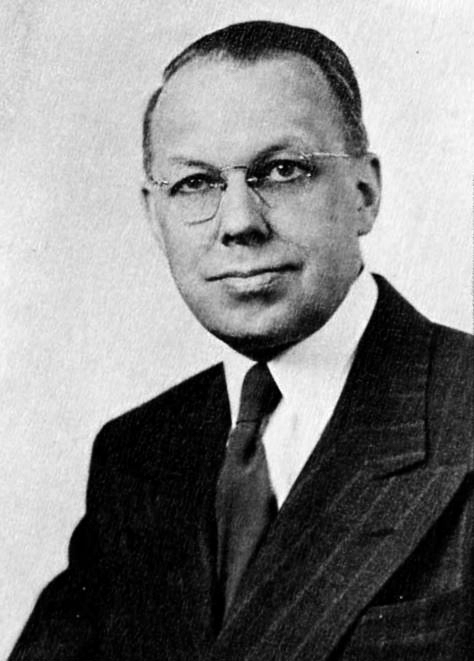
Nominee	Frank Moss	Ernest L. Wilkinson
Party	Democratic	Republican
Popular vote	227,822	169,562
Percentage	57.3%	42.7%
- County results Moss: 50–60% 60–70% 70–80% Wilkinson: 50-60% 60-70%
U.S. senator before election
Frank Moss
Democratic
Elected U.S. Senator
Frank Moss
Democratic

Democratic incumbent Frank Moss was reelected to a second term over Republican candidate Ernest L. Wilkinson, the president of Brigham Young University.

1964 United States Senate election in Utah
Party	Candidate	Votes	%
Democratic	Frank Moss (Incumbent)	227,822	57.33
Republican	Ernest L. Wilkinson	169,562	42.67
Majority		58,260	14.66
Turnout		397,384	
Democratic hold			

== Vermont ==
1964 United States Senate election in Vermont
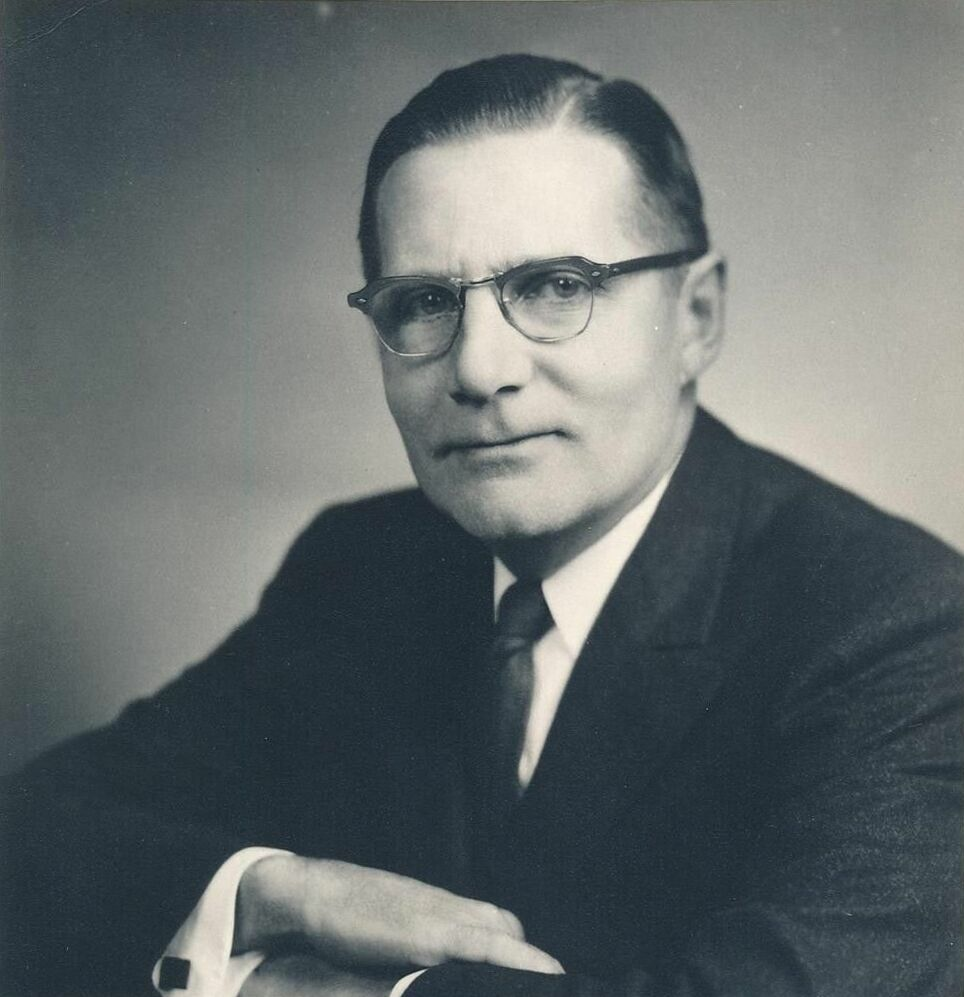

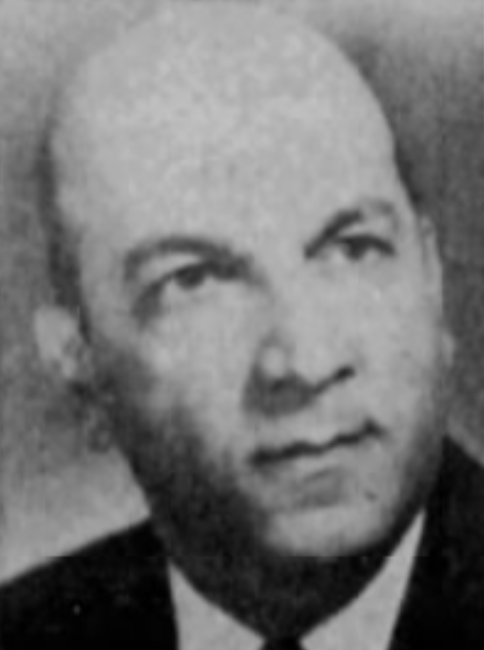
Nominee	Winston L. Prouty	Frederick J. Fayette
Party	Republican	Democratic
Popular vote	87,879	76,457
Percentage	53.4%	46.5%
- County results Prouty: 50–60% 60–70% Fayette: 50–60%
U.S. senator before election
Winston L. Prouty
Republican
Elected U.S. senator
Winston L. Prouty
Republican

Incumbent Republican Winston L. Prouty successfully ran for re-election, defeating Democratic candidate Frederick J. Fayette.

Republican primary results
Party	Candidate	Votes	%	±%
Republican	Winston L. Prouty (Incumbent)	43,648	99.9	
Republican	Other	63	0.1	
Total votes		'43,711'	'100'	

Democratic primary results
Party	Candidate	Votes	%	±%
Democratic	Frederick J. Fayette	12,388	71.1	
Democratic	William H. Meyer	4,913	28.2	
Democratic	Other	134	0.7	
Total votes		'17,435'	'100'	

1964 United States Senate election in Vermont
Party	Candidate	Votes	%	±%
Republican	Winston L. Prouty	83,302	50.7	
Independent	Winston L. Prouty	4,516	2.7	
Write-in	Winston L. Prouty	61	0.0	
Republican + Independent + Write-in	Winston L. Prouty (Incumbent)	87,879	53.4	
Democratic	Frederick J. Fayette	76,457	46.5	
N/A	Other	14	0.0	
Majority		11,422	6.95	
Total votes		'164,350'	'100.00%'	
Republican hold		Swing		

== Virginia ==
1964 United States Senate election in Virginia
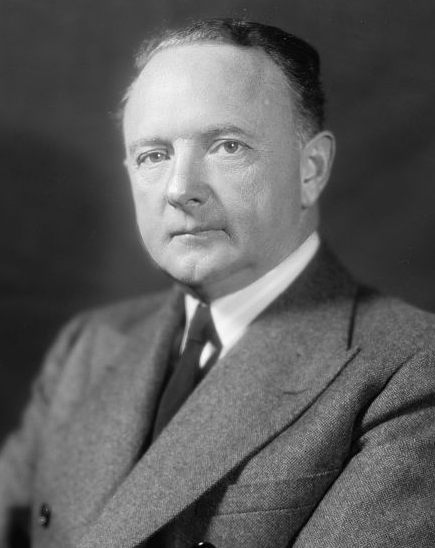

Nominee	Harry F. Byrd	Richard A. May	James W. Respess
Party	Democratic	Republican	Independent
Popular vote	592,270	176,624	95,526
Percentage	63.80%	19.03%	10.29%
- County and Independent City Results; Byrd: 40-50% 50-60% 60-70% 70-80% 80-90% May: 40-50% Respess: 50-60%
U.S. senator before election
Harry F. Byrd
Democratic
Elected U.S. Senator
Harry F. Byrd
Democratic

Incumbent Harry F. Byrd was re-elected to a seventh term, defeating Republican Richard A. May and independent James W. Respess.

1964 United States Senate election in Virginia
Party	Candidate	Votes	%	±%
Democratic	Harry F. Byrd (Incumbent)	592,270	63.80	−5.52%
Republican	Richard A. May	176,624	19.03	+19.03%
Independent	James W. Respess	95,526	10.29	
Independent	J.B. Brayman	30,594	3.30	
Independent	Milton L. Green	12,110	1.30	
Independent	Robert E. Poole Jr.	10,774	1.16	
Independent	Willie T. Wright	10,424	1.12	
Write-ins		51	0.01	
Majority		415,646	44.77	+1.72%
Turnout		928,373		
Democratic hold				

== Washington ==
1964 United States Senate election in Washington
- November 3, 1964
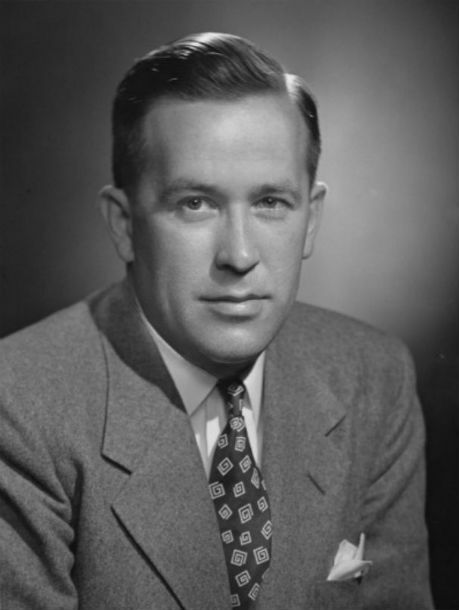
Nominee	Henry M. Jackson	Lloyd J. Andrews
Party	Democratic	Republican
Popular vote	875,950	337,138
Percentage	72.21%	27.79%
- County results Jackson: 50–60% 60–70% 70–80% 80–90%
U.S. senator before election
Henry M. Jackson
Democratic
Elected U.S. Senator
Henry M. Jackson
Democratic

Democratic incumbent Henry M. Jackson was reelected to a third term in a landslide, defeating Republican challenger Lloyd J. Andrews, who had previously served as the state's Superintendent of Public Instruction.

1964 United States Senate election in Washington
Party	Candidate	Votes	%
Democratic	Henry M. Jackson (Incumbent)	875,950	72.21
Republican	Lloyd J. Andrews	337,138	27.79
Majority		538,812	44.42
Turnout		1,213,088	
Democratic hold			

== West Virginia ==
1964 United States Senate election in West Virginia
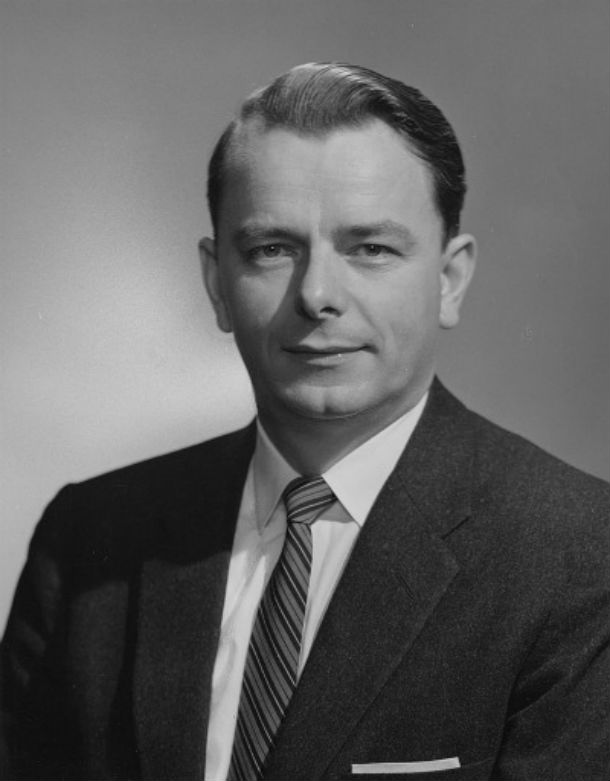

Nominee	Robert Byrd	Cooper P. Benedict
Party	Democratic	Republican
Popular vote	515,015	246,072
Percentage	67.67%	32.33%
- County results Byrd: 50–60% 60–70% 70–80% 80–90% Benedict: 50-60% 60-70%
U.S. senator before election
Robert Byrd
Democratic
Elected U.S. Senator
Robert Byrd
Democratic

Democratic incumbent Robert Byrd was reelected to a second term over Republican candidate Cooper Benedict. Byrd would serve in the Senate until his death in 2010, making him the longest-serving senator in United States history.

1964 United States Senate election in West Virginia
Party	Candidate	Votes	%
Democratic	Robert Byrd (Incumbent)	515,015	67.67
Republican	Cooper P. Benedict	246,072	32.33
Majority		268,943	34.33
Turnout		761,087	
Democratic hold			

== Wisconsin ==
1964 United States Senate election in Wisconsin
- November 3, 1964
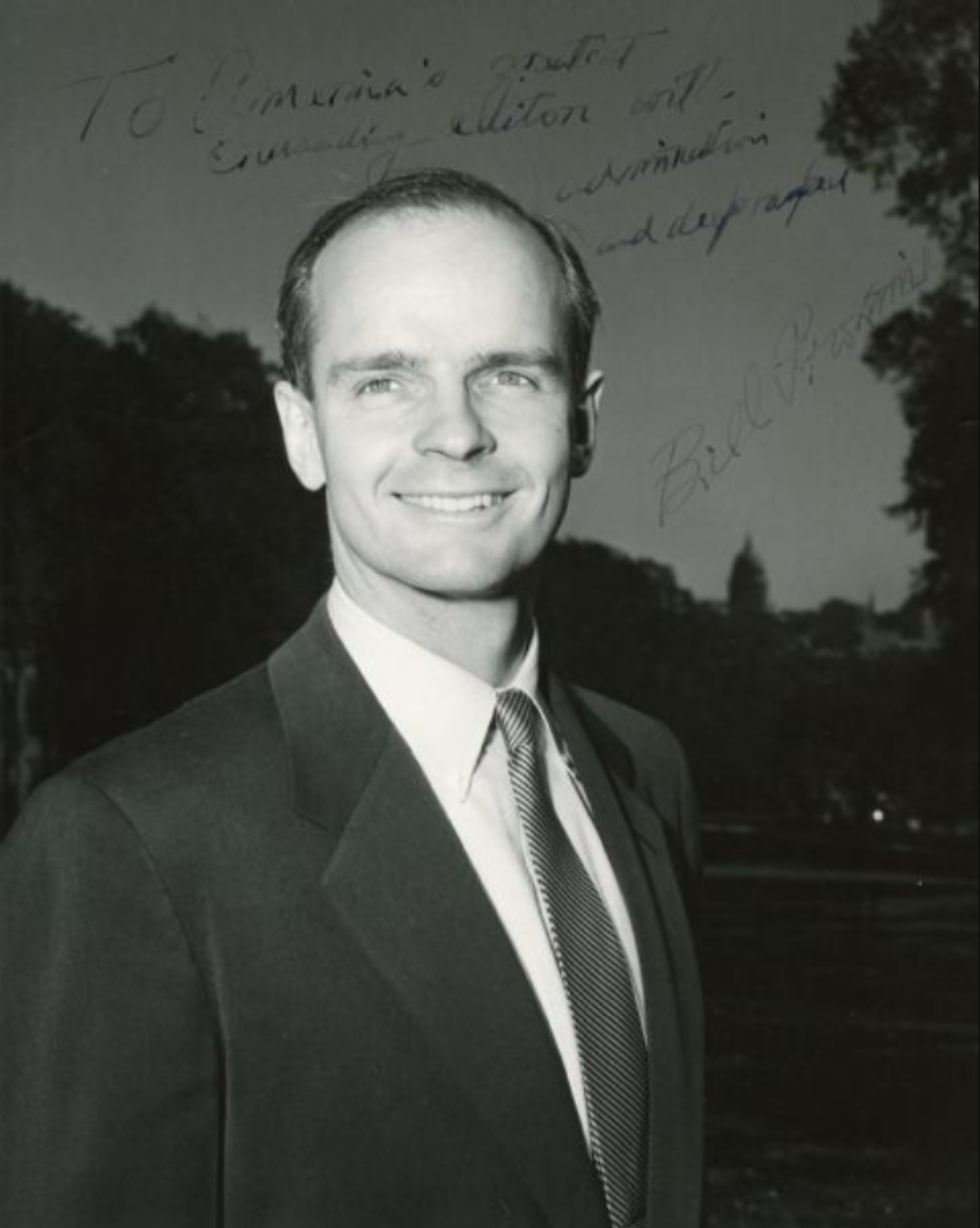

Nominee	William Proxmire	Wilbur N. Renk
Party	Democratic	Republican
Popular vote	892,013	780,116
Percentage	53.30%	46.61%
- County results Proxmire: 50–60% 60–70% 70–80% Renk: 50-60% 60-70%
U.S. senator before election
William Proxmire
Democratic
Elected U.S. Senator
William Proxmire
Democratic

Incumbent Democrat William Proxmire was reelected to a second full term, defeating Republican Wilbur Renk.

1964 United States Senate election in Wisconsin
Party	Candidate	Votes	%
Democratic	William Proxmire (Incumbent)	892,013	53.29
Republican	Wilbur N. Renk	780,116	46.61
Independent	Kenneth F. Klinkerk	1,062	0.06
Independent	Wayne Leverenz	479	0.03
None	Scattering	106	0.01
Majority		111,897	6.68
Turnout		1,673,776	
Democratic hold			

== Wyoming ==
1964 United States Senate election in Wyoming
- November 3, 1964
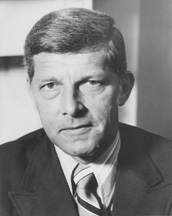

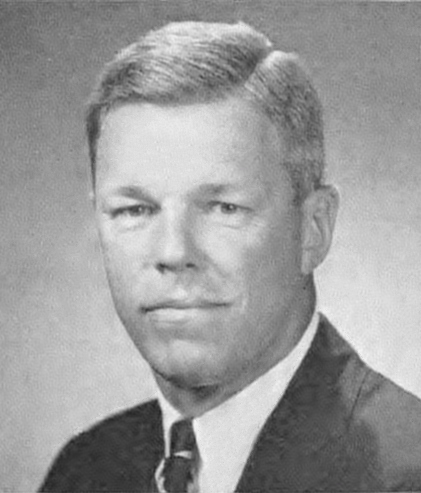
Nominee	Gale W. McGee	John S. Wold
Party	Democratic	Republican
Popular vote	76,485	65,185
Percentage	53.99%	46.01%
- County results McGee: 50–60% 60–70% 70–80% Wold: 50–60% 60–70%
U.S. senator before election
Gale W. McGee
Democratic
Elected U.S. Senator
Gale W. McGee
Democratic

1964 United States Senate election in Wyoming
Party	Candidate	Votes	%
Democratic	Gale McGee (Incumbent)	76,485	53.99
Republican	John S. Wold	65,185	46.01
Majority		11,300	6.98
Turnout		141,670	
Democratic hold			

== See also ==
- 1964 United States elections
  - 1964 United States gubernatorial elections
  - 1964 United States presidential election
  - 1964 United States House of Representatives elections
- 88th United States Congress
- 89th United States Congress
