= 1964 United States Senate election in Virginia =

- November 3, 1964
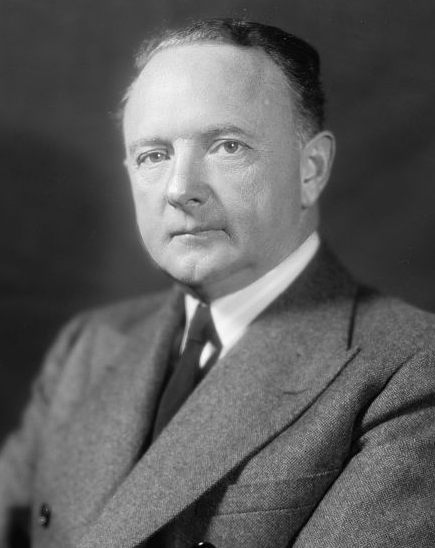

Nominee	Harry F. Byrd	Richard A. May	James W. Respess
Party	Democratic	Republican	Independent
Popular vote	592,270	176,624	95,526
Percentage	63.80%	19.03%	10.29%
- County and independent city results Byrd: 40–50% 50–60% 60–70% 70–80% 80–90% May: 40–50% Respess: 50–60%
U.S. senator before election
Harry F. Byrd
Democratic
Elected U.S. Senator
Harry F. Byrd
Democratic

The 1964 United States Senate election in Virginia was held on November 3, 1964. Incumbent Senator Harry F. Byrd, Sr. was re-elected to a seventh term after defeating Republican Richard A. May and independent James W. Respess.

== Results ==
United States Senate election in Virginia, 1964
Party	Candidate	Votes	%	±%
Democratic	Harry F. Byrd (inc.)	592,270	63.80%	−5.52%
Republican	Richard A. May	176,624	19.03%	+19.03%
Independent	James W. Respess	95,526	10.29%	
Independent	J.B. Brayman	30,594	3.30%	
Independent	Milton L. Green	12,110	1.30%	
Independent	Robert E. Poole, Jr.	10,774	1.16%	
Independent	Willie T. Wright	10,424	1.12%	
Write-ins		51	0.01%	
Majority		415,646	44.77%	+1.72%
Turnout		928,373		
Democratic hold				

== See also ==
- United States Senate elections, 1964
