= Elbert N. Carvel =

American politician (1910–2005)

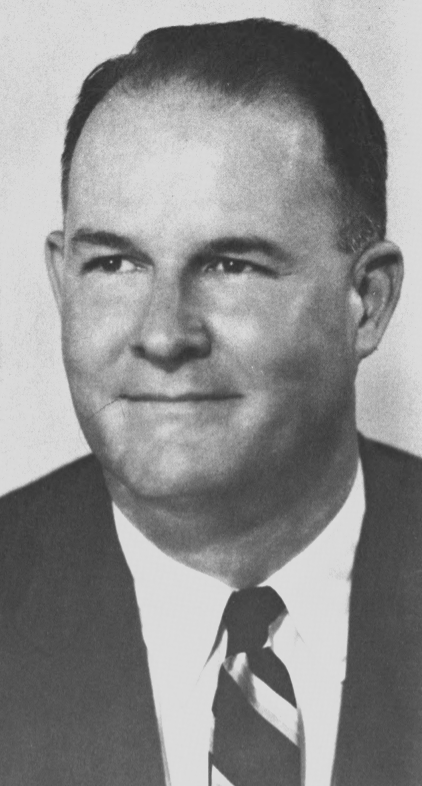

61st and 64th Governor of Delaware
- In office January 17, 1961 – January 19, 1965
- Lieutenant: Eugene Lammot
- Preceded by: David Buckson
- Succeeded by: Charles Terry
- In office January 18, 1949 – January 20, 1953
- Lieutenant: Alexis du Pont Bayard
- Preceded by: Walter Bacon
- Succeeded by: Caleb Boggs

12th Lieutenant Governor of Delaware
- In office January 16, 1945 – January 18, 1949
- Governor: Walter Bacon
- Preceded by: Isaac MacCollum
- Succeeded by: Alexis du Pont Bayard

Personal details
- Born: Elbert Nostrand Carvel; February 9, 1910 Shelter Island, New York, U.S.
- Died: February 6, 2005 (aged 94) Laurel, Delaware, U.S.
- Party: Democratic
- Occupation: Businessman

Elbert Nostrand "Bert" Carvel (February 9, 1910 – February 6, 2005) was an American businessman and politician from Laurel, in Sussex County, Delaware. He was a member of the Democratic Party, who served as the 12th Lieutenant Governor of Delaware and two non-consecutive terms as the Governor of Delaware.

== Early life and family ==
Carvel was born at Shelter Island, Long Island, New York, son of Arnold W. and Elizabeth Nostrand Carvel. Kent Island, Maryland was his childhood home. He married Ann Hall Valliant in 1932 and they had four children, Edwin, Elizabeth, Ann Hall and Barbara. They were members of St. Philip's Episcopal Church in Laurel, Delaware.

== Professional and political career ==
After moving to Laurel in 1936, he began his management of the Valliant Fertilizer Company, that would continue throughout his political career. In his first attempt at public office, Carvel was elected lieutenant governor in 1944, defeating Republican Clayton Bunting, Sr. He served one term from January 16, 1945, to January 18, 1949.

He appeared on the television show What's My Line? on November 13, 1960, as the nascent Governor-elect (second term) of Delaware where his "line" was "manufactures fertilizer."

== Governor of Delaware ==
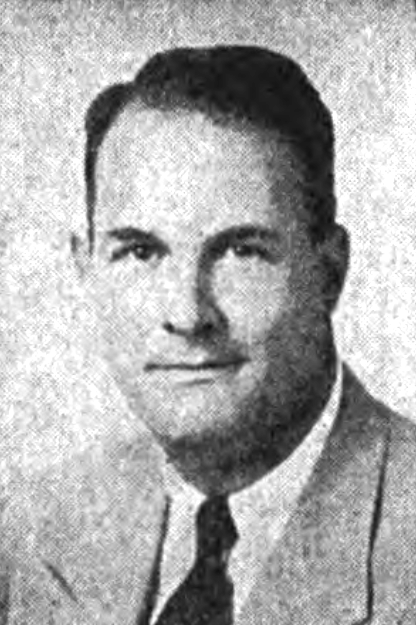
Carvel during his first term as governor.

Carvel was first elected Governor of Delaware in 1948, defeating Republican Hyland F. George and served one term from January 18, 1949, to January 20, 1953. He lost a bid for a second term in 1952 to U.S. Representative J. Caleb Boggs. Subsequently, he lost an election for U.S. Senate in 1958 to incumbent Republican U.S. Senator John J. Williams. However, he was elected to a second term as Governor of Delaware in 1960, defeating Republican John W. Rollins, a future lieutenant governor. Soon after this, on November 13, 1960, he appeared as a contestant on the TV game show What's My Line?. His line was that he manufactured fertilizer. This time he served from January 17, 1961, until January 19, 1965. Carvel lost a final bid for a U.S. Senate seat in 1964, again to incumbent Republican U.S. Senator John J. Williams.

As only the second Democrat elected governor in 48 years, he was also the first Democrat ever to win two terms.

Accomplishments during his separate terms included the establishment of a public service commission and state development department, the restructuring of election laws, the granting of a $28-million appropriation for the construction of schools, an increase in teacher salaries, the improvement of funding for road and highway development, the authorizing of the Interstate Compact on Mental Health, the sanctioning of the Delaware River and Bridge Authority, and the Municipal Home Rule Law. Elbert Nortrand Carvel

He was opposed to capital punishment and was an early and persistent leader for civil rights legislation in a still politically conservative Delaware. As Governor he led the successful effort to create a Delaware Supreme Court, the lack of which threatened Delaware's ability to handle corporate litigation, and thereby ended Delaware's status as the only state without such a court.

Among his other accomplishments during his tenures in office were the building of the first span of the Delaware Memorial Bridge, developing numerous other roads and highways, establishing the Delaware Public Service Commission and initiating the Delaware State Development Department.

== Death and legacy ==
Carvel died in Laurel, Delaware, three days before what would have been his 95th birthday and is buried at the Carvel Family Cemetery, Kent Island, Maryland.

Known as "Big Bert," Carvel stood 6' 6". He was known as a liberal Democrat from conservative "lower Delaware," and never hesitated to promote causes of importance to him regardless of their impact on his political career or his fertilizer business. The state office building at 820 North French Street, Wilmington is named for him, as is the University of Delaware Research and Education Center in Georgetown. The cafeteria in North Laurel Elementary School is named the "Carvel Room", after him.

== Almanac ==
Elections are held the first Tuesday after November 1. The Governor and Lieutenant Governor take office the third Tuesday of January and have four-year terms.

Delaware General Assembly (sessions while Governor)
Year	Assembly	Senate Majority	President pro tempore	House Majority	Speaker
1949–1950	115th	Democratic	Vera G. Davis	Republican	Harvey H. Lawson
1951–1952	116th	Democratic	Roy A. Cannon	Republican	Harvey H. Lawson
1961–1962	121st	Democratic	John B. Reilly	Democratic	Sherman W. Tribbitt
1963–1964	122nd	Democratic	Curtis W. Steen	Democratic	Sherman W. Tribbitt

Public Offices
Office	Type	Location	Began office	Ended office	notes
Lt. Governor	Executive	Dover	January 16, 1945	January 18, 1949	
Governor	Executive	Dover	January 18, 1949	January 20, 1953	
Governor	Executive	Dover	January 17, 1961	January 19, 1965	

Election results
Year	Office	Subject	Party	Votes	%	Opponent	Party	Votes	%
1944	Lt. Governor	Elbert N. Carvel	Democratic	44,524	51%	Clayton A. Bunting	Republican	42,595	49%
1948	Governor	Elbert N. Carvel	Democratic	75,339	54%	Hyland P. George	Republican	64,996	46%
1952	Governor	Elbert N. Carvel	Democratic	81,772	48%	J. Caleb Boggs	Republican	88,977	52%
1958	U.S. Senator	Elbert N. Carvel	Democratic	72,152	47%	John J. Williams	Republican	82,280	53%
1960	Governor	Elbert N. Carvel	Democratic	100,792	52%	John W. Rollins	Republican	94,043	48%
1964	U.S. Senator	Elbert N. Carvel	Democratic	96,850	48%	John J. Williams	Republican	103,782	52%

== Images ==
- Hall of Governors Portrait Gallery; Portrait courtesy of Historical and Cultural Affairs, Dover.

Party political offices
Preceded by Isaac J. MacCollum	Democratic nominee for Lieutenant Governor of Delaware; 1944	Succeeded by Alexis I. du Pont Bayard
Preceded by Isaac J. MacCollum	Democratic nominee for Governor of Delaware; 1948, 1952	Succeeded by J. H. Tyler McConnell
Preceded by Alexis I. du Pont Bayard	Democratic Party nominee for United States Senator (class 1) from Delaware; 1958, 1964	Succeeded by Jacob W. Zimmerman
Preceded by J. H. Tyler McConnell	Democratic nominee for Governor of Delaware; 1960	Succeeded by Charles L. Terry Jr.
Political offices
Preceded by Isaac J. MacCollum	Lieutenant Governor of Delaware; 1945–1949	Succeeded by Alexis I. du Pont Bayard
Preceded by Walter W. Bacon	Governor of Delaware; 1949–1953	Succeeded by J. Caleb Boggs
Preceded by David P. Buckson	Governor of Delaware; 1961–1965	Succeeded by Charles L. Terry Jr.
