= John J. Williams (politician) =

American businessman and politician

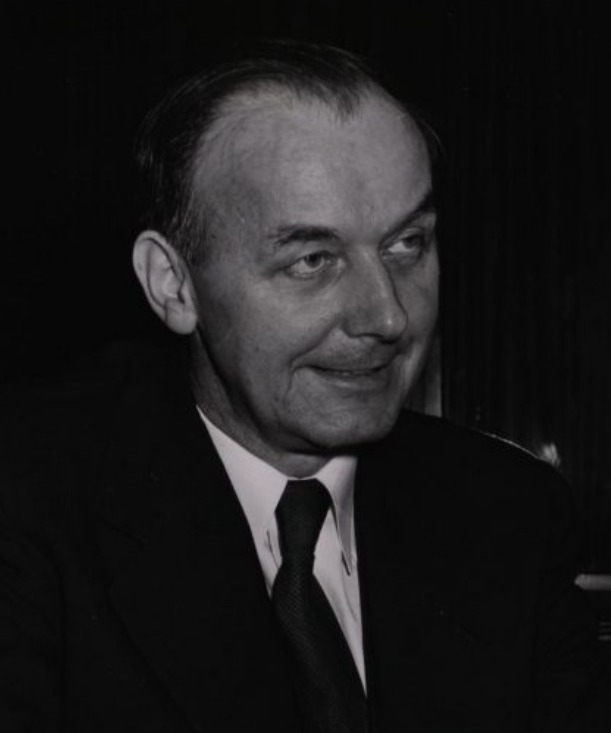
- Williams while serving, c. 1959

United States Senator from Delaware
- In office January 3, 1947 – December 31, 1970
- Preceded by: James M. Tunnell
- Succeeded by: William Roth

Personal details
- Born: John James Williams; May 17, 1904 Frankford, Delaware, U.S.
- Died: January 11, 1988 (aged 83) Lewes, Delaware, U.S.
- Party: Republican
- Spouse: Elsie Steele
- Occupation: Businessman

John James "Whispering Willie" Williams (May 17, 1904 – January 11, 1988) was an American businessman and politician from Millsboro, Delaware. He was a member of the Republican Party and served four terms as U.S. senator from Delaware from 1947 to 1970.

== Early life and family ==
Williams was born on a farm near Frankford, Sussex County, Delaware, the ninth of eleven children. In 1922, he moved to Millsboro, where he and his brother Preston established the Millsboro Feed Company, a livestock and poultry feed business. John Williams married Elsie Steele in 1924; they remained married until his death 64 years later. In 1946, he served on the Millsboro Town Council.

== United States Senate ==
Williams was elected to the U.S. Senate in 1946, defeating incumbent Democratic U.S. Senator James M. Tunnell. During this term, he served in the Republican majority in the 80th Congress, but was in the minority in the 81st and 82nd Congresses. He was elected to a second term in 1952, defeating Democrat Alexis I. du Pont Bayard, and once again served in the Republican majority in the 83rd Congress, but returned to the minority in the 84th and 85th Congresses. Williams was elected to a third term in 1958 and a fourth term in 1964, both times defeating Democrat Elbert N. Carvel, who at the time of the 1964 election was Governor of Delaware. During these terms Williams served in the Republican minority in the 86th through the 91st Congresses. In all, he served for 24 years, from January 3, 1947, until December 31, 1970, when he resigned just before the end of his fourth term. He served during the administrations of U.S. presidents Harry S. Truman, Dwight D. Eisenhower, John F. Kennedy, Lyndon B. Johnson, and Richard M. Nixon. Williams was Delaware's first four-term U.S. senator.

In the Senate, Williams established himself as an opponent of wasteful government bureaucracy. A proponent of free markets, he objected to President Truman's continuation of many New Deal and World War II policies. Williams supported tax cuts, opposed the continuation of price controls, and suggested the federal budget could be balanced by slashing one million federal jobs he felt were unnecessary after the Great Depression and World War II.

From 1947 through 1948, Williams worked to root out corruption in the Internal Revenue Service, exposing the illegal activities of two hundred employees of the Treasury Department. In October 1963, at a time when President Kennedy was pondering the future of his vice president, Lyndon Johnson, Williams exposed corruption in the office of U.S. Senate aide Bobby Baker, Johnson's protégé. Williams did not sign the 1956 Southern Manifesto, and voted in favor of the Civil Rights Acts of 1957, 1960, and 1964, as well as the 24th Amendment to the U.S. Constitution, the Voting Rights Act of 1965, and the confirmation of Thurgood Marshall to the U.S. Supreme Court, but voted against the Civil Rights Act of 1968. Williams was the distinctive 67th vote in favor of ending the filibuster of the 1964 Civil Rights Act, leading Mike Mansfield to proclaim "That's it!". In 1967, Williams helped defeat a proposed rule change that would have eliminated the filibuster, a tool that had been of great use to him in exposing government waste and misconduct. In 1968, unable to defeat the tax increase proposed by President Johnson, Williams worked with Democratic U.S. Senator George Smathers of Florida to simultaneously cut federal spending by $60 billion.

Williams, as well as his Senate colleague Prescott Bush of Connecticut, was considered a possible running mate for Republican presidential nominee Dwight D. Eisenhower in 1952, but removed himself from consideration. He was also considered for a spot on the Republican ticket in 1964 and as a possible replacement for Spiro Agnew when he resigned as vice president of the United States in 1973. Williams was a delegate to the Republican National Conventions in 1948 and 1956.

In 1965, Williams began pressing for a law that would set a mandatory retirement age of 65 for all elected officials. Though mandatory retirement was never enacted, Williams announced in 1969 that he would not seek a fifth term in the U.S. Senate. On December 31, 1970, he resigned from the Senate just before the end of his term, allowing his protégé, newly elected Republican William V. Roth, Jr., to gain additional seniority in his new class of U.S. senators.

In September 1966, Williams assailed the anti-inflation program of the Johnson administration as a "piece-meal approach" to a larger issue and advocated for a five percent across the board tax hike as well as Congress resuming a leadership role on the subject of enacting "necessary remedies to stave off financial collapse that may engulf us".

== Death and legacy ==
Williams died in a hospital in Lewes, Delaware and was buried in Millsboro Cemetery, at Millsboro. He was a member of the Methodist Church, the Freemasons, and the Shriners. During his career in the U.S. Senate, Williams was called the "Lonewolf Investigator," "Watchdog of the Treasury," "Honest John," "Mr. Integrity," and most often, "the Conscience of the Senate." The section of Delaware Route 24 between Millsboro and Midway is named the John J. Williams Highway in his honor.

== Almanac ==
Elections are held the first Tuesday after November 1. U.S. Senators are popularly elected and take office January 3 for a six-year term.

Public Offices
| Office | Type | Location | Began office | Ended office | Notes |
|---|---|---|---|---|---|
| U.S. Senator | Legislature | Washington | January 3, 1947 | January 3, 1953 | |
| U.S. Senator | Legislature | Washington | January 3, 1953 | January 3, 1959 | |
| U.S. Senator | Legislature | Washington | January 3, 1959 | January 3, 1965 | |
| U.S. Senator | Legislature | Washington | January 3, 1965 | December 31, 1970 | |

United States Congress service
| Dates | Congress | Chamber | Majority | President | Committees | Class/District |
|---|---|---|---|---|---|---|
| 1947–1949 | 80th | U.S. Senate | Republican | Harry S. Truman | | class 1 |
| 1949–1951 | 81st | U.S. Senate | Democratic | Harry S. Truman | | class 1 |
| 1951–1953 | 82nd | U.S. Senate | Democratic | Harry S. Truman | | class 1 |
| 1953–1955 | 83rd | U.S. Senate | Republican | Dwight D. Eisenhower | | class 1 |
| 1955–1957 | 84th | U.S. Senate | Democratic | Dwight D. Eisenhower | | class 1 |
| 1957–1959 | 85th | U.S. Senate | Democratic | Dwight D. Eisenhower | | class 1 |
| 1959–1961 | 86th | U.S. Senate | Democratic | Dwight D. Eisenhower | | class 1 |
| 1961–1963 | 87th | U.S. Senate | Democratic | John F. Kennedy | | class 1 |
| 1963–1965 | 88th | U.S. Senate | Democratic | John F. Kennedy; Lyndon B. Johnson | | class 1 |
| 1965–1967 | 89th | U.S. Senate | Democratic | Lyndon B. Johnson | | class 1 |
| 1967–1969 | 90th | U.S. Senate | Democratic | Lyndon B. Johnson | | class 1 |
| 1969–1971 | 91st | U.S. Senate | Democratic | Richard M. Nixon | | class 1 |

Election results
| Year | Office | Subject | Party | Votes | % | Opponent | Party | Votes | % |
|---|---|---|---|---|---|---|---|---|---|
| 1946 | U.S. Senator | John J. Williams | Republican | 62,603 | 55% | James M. Tunnell | Democratic | 50,910 | 45% |
| 1952 | U.S. Senator | John J. Williams | Republican | 93,020 | 55% | Alexis I. du Pont Bayard | Democratic | 77,685 | 45% |
| 1958 | U.S. Senator | John J. Williams | Republican | 82,280 | 53% | Elbert N. Carvel | Democratic | 72,152 | 47% |
| 1964 | U.S. Senator | John J. Williams | Republican | 103,782 | 52% | Elbert N. Carvel | Democratic | 96,850 | 48% |

== Images ==
- Political and Historical Figures Portrait Gallery; Portrait courtesy of Historical and Cultural Affairs, Dover.

Party political offices
| Preceded by John G. Townsend Jr. | Republican nominee for U.S. Senator from Delaware (Class 1); 1946, 1952, 1958, 1964 | Succeeded by William Roth |
U.S. Senate
| Preceded by James M. Tunnell | U.S. Senator (Class 1) from Delaware; 1947-1970; Served alongside: C. Douglass Buck, J. Allen Frear Jr., J. Caleb Boggs | Succeeded by William Roth |
