= 1958 United States Senate election in Delaware =

- November 4, 1958
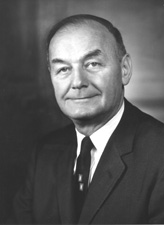

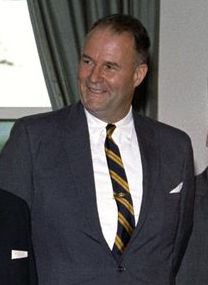
Nominee	John J. Williams	Elbert Carvel
Party	Republican	Democratic
Popular vote	82,280	72,152
Percentage	53.28%	46.72%
- County results Williams: 50–60%
U.S. senator before election
John J. Williams
Republican
Elected U.S. Senator
John J. Williams
Republican

The 1958 United States Senate election in Delaware took place on November 4, 1958. Incumbent Republican U.S. Senator John J. Williams was re-elected to a third term in office over Democratic former Governor Elbert Carvel.

== General election ==
=== Candidates ===
- Elbert Carvel, former Governor of Delaware (Democratic)
- John J. Williams, incumbent U.S. Senator since 1947 (Republican)

=== Results ===
General election results
Party	Candidate	Votes	%	±%
Republican	John J. Williams (incumbent)	82,280	53.28%	▼1.21
Democratic	Elbert Carvel	72,152	46.72%	▲1.21
Total votes		154,432	100.00%	
Republican hold				

== See also ==
- 1958 United States Senate elections
