= Andrea 't Mannetje =

New Zealand-based epidemiologist (1972–2023)

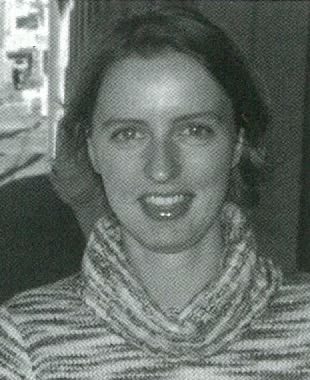
- Maanetje in 2003
- Born: 5 February 1972
- Died: 30 August 2023 (aged 51); Wellington, New Zealand
- Partner: Jeroen Douwes
- Children: 1

Academic background
- Education: Utrecht University

Andrea Martine 't Mannetje (5 February 1972 – 30 August 2023) was a New Zealand epidemiologist, and was a full professor at Massey University. She specialised in occupational causes of cancer, but also worked on environmental causes of neurodegenerative diseases, birth defects, and inflammatory bowel disease.

== Academic career ==
In 2003, Mannetje completed a PhD on the occupational causes of cancer at the University of Utrecht. Mannetje worked at the International Agency for Research on Cancer in France, before moving to Massey University. She was promoted to full professor in 2022.

Mannetje focused on cancer for her early research, but later included a wider range of diseases in her work, covering environmental causes of neurodegenerative diseases, birth defects, and inflammatory bowel disease. Her research showed that lead levels in New Zealander's blood had dropped by 90% over the last 36 years. Her research also showed that combinations of everyday chemicals in people's environments could be causing cancer, even when the individual chemicals were at low levels. She led a team that demonstrated that indoor dust is a source of carcinogenic chemicals in breast milk, through inclusion of brominated compounds found in fire-retardants, but that the levels are likely too low in New Zealand to do any harm. Mannetje also surveyed which chemicals were most likely to be carcinogens in New Zealand work environments, and found more than 50 commonly present carcinogens, including wood dust, asbestos, benzene, and formaldehyde.

More recently Mannetje had looked at New Zealanders' exposure to pesticides, and showed that workplace exposure to pesticides was associated with leukemia, lymphoma, and motor neurone disease. Mannetje was part of a World Health Organisation panel of 18 scientists who examined the safety of glyphosate weedkillers. The panel found "there was 'limited' evidence of cancer in humans exposed to the chemical, and 'sufficient' evidence of cancer in experimental animals". Mannetje said "The human evidence suggests from epidemiological studies that exposure to glyphosate, particularly long-term exposure over multiple years, is associated with Non-Hodgkin's lymphoma". She called for the Environmental Protection Authority to reclassify glyphosate in New Zealand so that the public would be aware of the potential risks. The EPA instead commissioned its own report, carried out by one scientist, Wayne Temple, that said glyphosate was not a cancer risk in humans.

Mannetje died at the Mary Potter Hospice in Wellington on 30 August 2023, at the age of 51.

== Selected works ==
- Manolis Kogevinas; 't Mannetje, Andrea Martine; Sylvaine Cordier; et al. (2003). "Occupation and bladder cancer among men in Western Europe". Cancer Causes & Control. 14 (10): 907–914. doi:10.1023/b:caco.0000007962.19066.9c. PMID 14750529. Wikidata Q38480430.
- Steenland, Kyle; 't Mannetje, Andrea Martine; Boffetta, Paolo; Leslie Stayner; Michael Attfield; Jingqiong Chen; Mustafa Döşemeci; Nicholas DeKlerk; Hnizdo, Eva; Riitta Koskela; Harvey Checkoway (2001). "Pooled exposure-response analyses and risk assessment for lung cancer in 10 cohorts of silica-exposed workers: an IARC multicentre study". Cancer Causes & Control. 12 (9): 773–784. doi:10.1023/a:1012214102061. PMID 11714104. Wikidata Q23916472.
- Amanda Eng; 't Mannetje, Andrea Martine; McLean, Dave; Ellison, Lis; Cheng, Soo; Pearce, Neil Edward (2011). "Gender differences in occupational exposure patterns". Occupational and Environmental Medicine. 68 (12): 888–894. doi:10.1136/oem.2010.064097. PMID 21486991. Wikidata Q44776177.
- Lissowska, Jolanta Maria; Alicja Bardin-Mikolajczak; Fletcher, Tony; et al. (2005). "Lung cancer and indoor pollution from heating and cooking with solid fuels: the IARC international multicentre case-control study in Eastern/Central Europe and the United Kingdom". American Journal of Epidemiology. 162 (4): 326–333. doi:10.1093/aje/kwi204. PMID 16014775. Wikidata Q43414699.
- 't Mannetje, Andrea Martine; H Kromhout (2003). "The use of occupation and industry classifications in general population studies". International Journal of Epidemiology. 32 (3): 419–428. doi:10.1093/ije/dyg080. PMID 12777430. Wikidata Q40584878.
