= Rollins =

Rollins is a surname which may refer to:

== People ==
- Adrian Rollins (born 1972), English cricketer
- Al Rollins (1926–1996), Canadian ice hockey goaltender
- Andre Rollins, Bahamian politician
- Annie Katsura Rollins, American Chinese shadow puppeteer
- Bridgett Rollins (born 1956), American model
- Brooke Rollins (born 1972), 33rd United States secretary of agriculture
- Charlemae Hill Rollins (1897–1979), librarian, author and storyteller in African-American literature
- Clarke Rollins (1912–1996), Canadian petroleum distributor and political figure
- Daniel G. Rollins (1842–1897), New York County D.A.
- Danielle Rollins, American novelist
- Dennis Rollins (born 1964), British jazz trombonist
- Doug Rollins (1938–2012), Canadian politician
- Ed Rollins (born 1943), American political strategist
- Edward H. Rollins (1824–1889), American politician from New Hampshire
- Frank W. Rollins (1860–1915), American lawyer, banker and Republican politician from New Hampshire
- Henry Rollins (born 1961), born Henry Garfield, American rock music performer, storyteller, author, actor and poet
- Howard Rollins (1950–1996), American television, film and stage actor
- Hyder Edward Rollins (1889–1958), American scholar and English professor
- Jack Rollins (producer) (1915–2015), long-time producer of Woody Allen's films
- James Rollins (born 1961), pen name of American author Dr. Jim Czajkowski
- James S. Rollins (1812–1888), American politician and lawyer from Missouri
- Jared Rollins (born 1977), American mixed martial artist
- Jerry Rollins (born 1955), WHA player
- Jimmy Rollins (born 1978), American baseball player
- John Rollins (golfer) (born 1975), American golfer
- John W. Rollins (1916–2000), American businessman and Republican politician from Delaware
- Kenny Rollins (1923–2012), American basketball player
- Kevin Rollins (born 1953), American businessman and philanthropist
- Lawson Rollins, musician
- Leslie E. Rollins, set decorator
- Moak Rollins (1921–2005), American businessman, educator, and government official
- Orville Wayne Rollins (1912–1991), American businessman, co-founder of Rollins, Inc.
- Peter Rollins (born 1973)
- Rachael Rollins (born 1971), American lawyer and politician serving as the District Attorney of Suffolk County in Massachusetts
- Randall Rollins (1931–2020), American businessman.
- Reed C. Rollins (1911–1998), American botanist and professor
- Rich Rollins (1938–2025), American baseball player
- Rio Rollins, star of the "Rainbow Gate" TV series
- Rose Rollins (born 1978), American actress and model
- Seth Rollins (born 1986), ring name of American professional wrestler Colby Lopez
- Shorty Rollins (1929–1998), NASCAR driver
- Sonny Rollins (1930–2026), American jazz tenor saxophonist
- Wayne Tree Rollins (born 1955), American basketball center
- Walter C. Rollins (1857–1908), American racehorse trainer
- Walter E. Rollins (1906–1973), alias Jack Rollins, co-writer of "Frosty the Snowman"
- Will Rollins (born 1984), American politician
- William Herbert Rollins (1852–1929), American scientist and dentist

== Fictional characters ==
- Amanda Rollins, from Law and Order: Special Victims Unit
- Leonard Rollins, a character in the American sitcom television series Silver Spoons
- Tibby Rollins, from The Sisterhood of the Traveling Pants
- Will Rollins, from Freddy vs. Jason—see List of characters in the Nightmare on Elm Street series#Will Rollins

== See also ==
- Rollin (disambiguation)
