= Gary Rollins =

American billionaire businessman (born 1944)

- Born: Gary W. Rollins; August 30, 1944 (age 82)
- Education: University of Tennessee at Chattanooga
- Occupation: CEO of Rollins, Inc.
- Spouses: Ruth Magness; Kathleen (Wingard) Rollins
- Children: 4
- Parent(s): O. Wayne Rollins; Grace Crum Rollins
- Relatives: John W. Rollins (uncle)

Gary W. Rollins (born August 30, 1944) is an American billionaire businessman. Prior to his retirement he was the chief executive officer (CEO) of Rollins, Inc., the US's largest pest control company.

== Early life ==
Rollins was born on August 30, 1944. His father was O. Wayne Rollins and his mother, Grace Crum Rollins.

Rollins graduated with a bachelor of business administration degree from the University of Tennessee at Chattanooga in 1967.

== Career ==
Rollins was the CEO of Orkin until July 2009. He has been its chairman since February 2004. Additionally, he has been the CEO of Rollins Inc. since July 2001.

He serves on the board of director of RPC, Inc.

On the Bloomberg 2024 list of the world's billionaires, he was ranked #430 with a net worth of US$6.35 billion.

== Political activity ==
Rollins contributed $25,000 to Donald Trump's 2020 presidential campaign.

== Personal life ==
He and his first wife, Ruth Magness, owned a 1,800-acre ranch near Cartersville, Georgia.

They have four children.

- Glen Rollins
- Ruth Ellen Rollins
- Nancy Louise Rollins
- O. Wayne Rollins II

Their son, Glen Rollins sued his father and his uncle Randall Rollins, chairman of Rollins Inc, over "rightful cash allocations". Glen's three siblings all joined him in the lawsuit, as did his mother, Ruthie, who filed for divorce from Gary at about the same time. Randall Rollins' five children took their father and Gary's side. Glen and Danielle also began divorce proceedings. After nearly a decade of litigation, the parties reached a confidential settlement in November 2019, just before closing arguments were set to begin in a Fulton County courtroom. Throughout the proceedings, Gary Rollins maintained that his actions were in line with the intentions of his father, O. Wayne Rollins, emphasizing a commitment to preserving the family's legacy and ensuring the responsible management of the family's substantial assets. The settlement's terms remain confidential, but the conclusion of the lawsuit suggests a mutual agreement was reached that honors the family's values and business principles. The family's "pest control empire" is worth about $14.2 billion.

Rollins' second wife is Kathleen (Wingard) Rollins.

In June 2018, it was announced that Rollins and wife Kathleen had given a gift of $40 million to his alma mater, University of Tennessee at Chattanooga, in which the College of Business will now be named the Gary W. Rollins College of Business.
