= Vidhu Aggarwal =

American poet

Academic background
- Education: University of Southern California

Academic work
- Discipline: Literary studies, comics studies
- Institutions: Rollins

Vidhu Aggarwal is an Indian-born American professor of English at Rollins in Winter Park, Florida, and is primarily known as a contemporary and modern poetics scholar. A poet and creative writer, her comic poetry work highlight a fascination with fluidity around identity and culture. She teaches poetry and postcolonial/transnational studies.

== Career ==
Vidhu Aggarwal creates multi-media video, poetry, and scholarly works. Her work often touches on the intersection of identity and technology and the ongoing evolution of these concepts in modern society. She is the founding editor of the multi-media journal SPECS, worked with the John Sims Project on "The 13 Flag Funerals" in Florida, and with artist Bishakh Som on "Lady Humpadori," a poetry/comic book collaboration. She is on the executive board of Thinking Its Presences: Race, Advocacy, Solidarity in the Arts. Her poems are in the Boston Review top 25 of 2016. She is a Kundiman Fellow. Her book of poems The Trouble with Humpadori (2016) received the Editor's Choice Prize from The (Great) Indian Poetry Collective. Her work has appeared in INK BRICK, The Missing Slate, Chicago Quarterly Review and Black Warrior Review.

Born in Ranchi, India, Aggarwal grew up in the Southern U.S., primarily in Louisiana and Texas.

== Selected bibliography ==
=== Book ===
- The Trouble with Humpadori (2016)

=== Poems ===
- BOSTON REVIEW POET'S SAMPLER introduced by BHANU KAPIL with a comic by BISHAKH SOMSPHINX FRIEND in Pedestal
- SHIVA, AGAIN & AGAIN and JACK SING-ALONG
- The World is Flat Friend
- CURSOR (EAST & WEST, TWINKLE TWINKLE
- Filmi Playback Singer Ghazal
- SOLDIERS in Sugar House Review
- BATH in Bint el Nas
