= Rose Hudson-Wilkin =

British Anglican bishop (born 1961)

The Right Reverend Rose Hudson-Wilkin CD MBE KHC
- Bishop of Dover
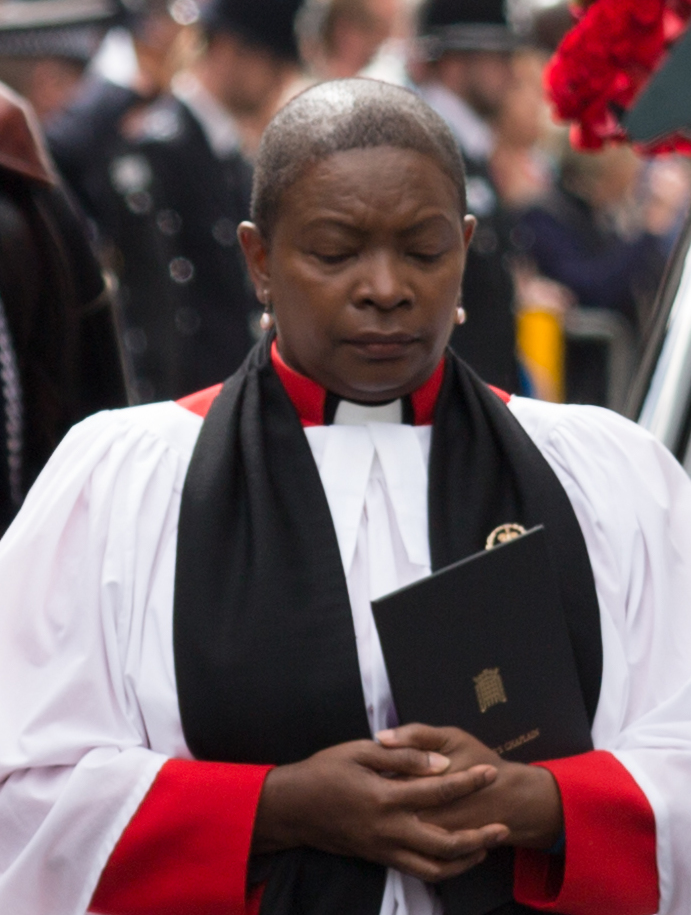
- Hudson-Wilkin in April 2017
- Church: Church of England
- Diocese: Canterbury
- Elected: 19 November 2019
- In office: 2019 to present
- Predecessor: Trevor Willmott
- Other post: Bishop in Canterbury (2019–present)
- Previous posts: Priest-in-Charge of St Mary-at-Hill, London (2014–19); Chaplain to the Speaker of the House of Commons (2010–19); Priest-Vicar of Westminster Abbey (2010–19)

Orders
- Ordination: 1991 (deacon); 1994 (priest) by Keith Sutton
- Consecration: 2019 (bishop) by Justin Welby

Personal details
- Born: Rose Josephine Hudson; 19 January 1961 (age 65) Montego Bay, Colony of Jamaica
- Denomination: Church of England
- Residence: Old Palace, Canterbury, Kent
- Spouse: Kenneth Wilkin
- Children: 3
- Occupation: Cleric
- Education: Montego Bay High School

MBE ribbon

CD ribbon

Rose Josephine Hudson-Wilkin CD MBE KHC (born 19 January 1961) is a British Anglican prelate, who serves as Suffragan Bishop of Dover in the diocese of Canterbury – deputising for the archbishop – since 2019: she is the first black woman to become a Church of England bishop. She was previously Chaplain to the Speaker of the House of Commons from 2010 to 2019, having trained with the Church Army before entering parish ministry.

== Early life ==
Born in Montego Bay, Jamaica, Hudson-Wilkin was raised by her father, an enthusiastic cricketer, and aunt Pet, her mother having departed for England when she was born. She did not meet her mother again until she was nine. She was educated at Montego Bay High School, an all-girls secondary school in Montego Bay. She was 14 when she decided to join the ministry and, in a 2012 interview in The Daily Telegraph, she said: "I simply had this overwhelming sense that this was what I was called to do."

== Ordained ministry ==
In 1982, Hudson-Wilkin travelled to the UK and settled in the West Midlands where she studied at the Church Army college. After training at the West Midlands Ministerial Training Course in preparation for ordained ministry, she was made a Deacon in the Church of England at Petertide 1991 (30 June) by Keith Sutton, Bishop of Lichfield, at Lichfield Cathedral. From 1991 to 1994, she served as the deacon of St Matthew's Church, Wolverhampton. She was ordained a priest on 23 April 1994 (by Bishop Sutton, at Lichfield Cathedral), in the first few weeks that the Church of England ordained women to the priesthood. Remaining at St Matthew's Church, she served her curacy from 1994 to 1995.

From 1995 to 1998, she was assistant curate of St Andrew's Church, West Bromwich. During this time, she also worked with the Committee on Black Anglican Concern. It was founded after the Faith in the City report was published in 1985 and worked to combat racism in the Church of England. It has since been replaced by the Committee for Minority Ethnic Anglican Concerns.

In 1998, she took up the role as vicar of Holy Trinity Church, Dalston, and All Saints Church, Haggerston, an inner-city parish in Hackney, London. She was appointed a Chaplain to the Queen in 2007. In 2010, she was appointed Chaplain to the Speaker of the House of Commons in addition to her parish work. In March 2013, she was installed as a prebendary of St Paul's Cathedral in recognition of "her service to the Church, community and most recently as Chaplain to the Speaker of the House of Commons". In October 2014, it was announced that she was to become priest-in-charge of St Mary-at-Hill in the City of London. She moved to her new parish in November 2014, while maintaining her additional appointments.

From November 2014, Hudson-Wilkin was priest-in-charge of St Mary-at-Hill in the City of London, until late 2019, additionally holding the role of Chaplain to the Speaker of the House of Commons, as well as priest vicar at Westminster Abbey and a Chaplain to the Queen. In 2012, she was tipped as likely to be one of the first women to become bishops in the Church of England. On 28 June 2019, she was announced as the next Bishop of Dover, to run the diocese of Canterbury on behalf of the archbishop of Canterbury.

On 19 May 2018, she was one of several religious leaders to lead prayers at the wedding of Prince Harry and Meghan Markle in St George's Chapel, Windsor.

=== Bishop of Dover ===
On 28 June 2019, it was announced that Hudson-Wilkin was to become Bishop suffragan of Dover. As a suffragan bishop, the bishop of Dover has authority delegated by the archbishop of Canterbury to oversee the diocese of Canterbury on behalf of the diocesan bishop as Bishop in Canterbury. She took up her see immediately before her consecration, which was scheduled for 19 November 2019 at St Paul's Cathedral. Press coverage of the announcement noted that she would be the first black woman to become a Church of England bishop; Guli Francis-Dehqani was the first ethnic minority woman to become a bishop, in 2017.

On 19 November 2019, Hudson-Wilkin was consecrated a bishop by Archbishop Justin Welby at St Paul's Cathedral. She was installed as Bishop of Dover during a service at Canterbury Cathedral on 30 November 2019.

Hudson-Wilkin was appointed Member of the Order of the British Empire (MBE) in the 2020 New Year Honours for "services to young people and the Church", having received the Order of Distinction (CD) from the Jamaican Government in 2019. She was also listed in the 2020 and 2021 Powerlist of the 100 most influential people in the UK of African/African-Caribbean descent.

On 6 February 2023, she was appointed an Honorary Bencher of Lincoln's Inn and, on 23 March 2023, she gave the Haberdashers' Golden Lecture at St Bartholomew-the-Less Church in the City of London.

In May 2023, she took part in the Coronation, one of three female bishops to do so. She officiated at the funeral of William Brown, a seven-year-old boy who was killed in a suspected hit-and-run crash, at St Mary and St Eanswythe's Church in Folkestone, within her episcopal jurisdiction.

== Public attention ==
After taking up her parish role in Hackney, Hudson-Wilkin staged a rooftop protest on the church with her curate to highlight the need for funds to repair the fabric of the building. Speaking on the BBC Radio 4 programme Desert Island Discs in January 2014, she said that with so much development going on in Hackney, she was trying to draw attention to the plight of the church, which had a leaking roof, adding that she wished she could have stayed a little longer on the roof as the protest attracted donations for its repair.

Hudson-Wilkin came to wider attention as the first black female to hold the role of Queen's Chaplain. When she was appointed to the Commons some people alleged that this was an act of political correctness on the part of the speaker, John Bercow. Ultimately, the traditional role was split in two with Hudson-Wilkin remaining in her Hackney parish and attending the Commons to lead prayer and services at the chapel of St Mary Undercroft, while Andrew Tremlett took up the posts of a Canon of Westminster and rector of St Margaret's, Westminster.

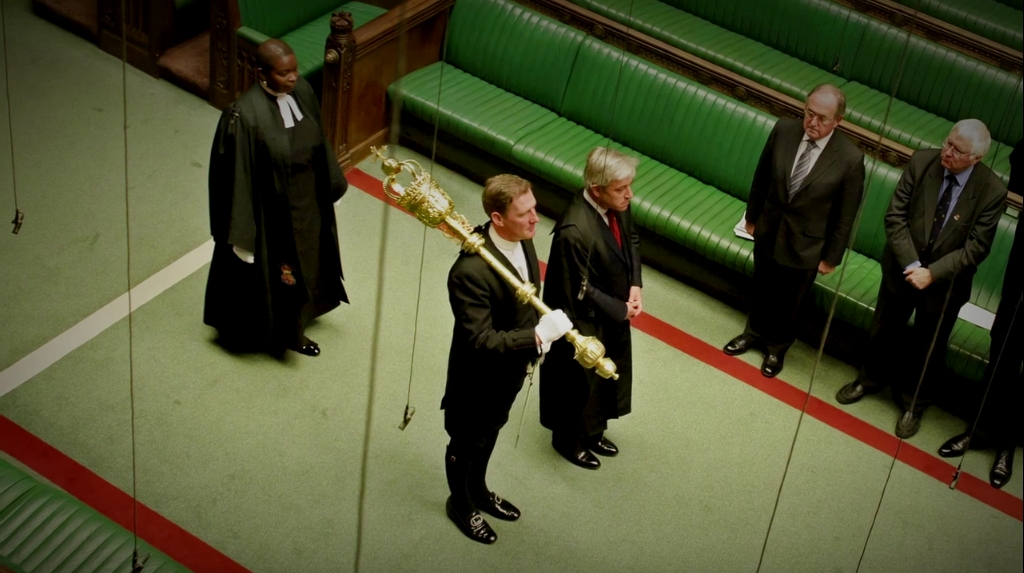
Hudson-Wilkin processing in Parliament when Chaplain to Speaker Bercow

In an interview in The Observer a year after her appointment to the Commons, Hudson-Wilkin commented that she would like to see a more civil attitude among MPs: "That's my secret prayer actually: the world is looking on and I just believe that I would like to see a change there in the way they handle listening to each other and the way they speak to each other." Hudson-Wilkin has updated the traditional 17th-century prayers before parliamentary debates by introducing mention of topical events, also saying a prayer on behalf of International Women's Day in 2010 that reportedly attracted complaints to the speaker by some MPs.

A critic of what she has described as institutional racism in the church, she thought racism was a more pressing issue than that of homosexuality. She has also spoken on the subject of gay marriage, telling The Times that the church is "obsessed with sex" and there are many more important issues.

During her interview on Desert Island Discs, Hudson-Wilkin was asked about the proposed ordination of women as bishops and said: "I believe that we hold certain prejudices about certain things and we believe them to be true ... What I want is for people to be open to the possibilities that their minds might be changed." She added: "I think the church has been the poorer actually for not having the gifts of women – men and women – in its leadership."

In an episode of the BBC programme The Big Questions aired in January 2015, discussing the lack of legal recognition for humanist marriages, Hudson-Wilkin repeatedly characterised humanists as "anti-religion" and expressed bewilderment that humanists would want to get married, saying "Marriage is a sacred act. We see it as a gift from God, so it is not something we think anybody just gets up and, stands in front, and says I'm marrying you. If humanists are anti-religion I don't understand why you want to keep and do all of the things that religion does."

== Personal life ==
She met her husband, Kenneth Wilkin, while training at the Church Army College. He currently serves as chaplain to HM Prison Wandsworth. The couple has two daughters and a son.

== See also ==
- Old Palace, Canterbury
- Honorary Chaplain to the Sovereign
- Prebendaries of St Paul's Cathedral

Church of England titles
Preceded by Trevor Willmott	Bishop of Dover; 2019 to present	Incumbent
