= Randall Rollins =

American pest control executive

- Born: November 5, 1931; Ringgold, Georgia, US
- Died: August 17, 2020 (aged 88); Atlanta, Georgia, U.S.
- Occupation: Chairman of Rollins Inc.
- Spouse: Peggy Hastings
- Children: 5
- Parent(s): O. Wayne Rollins; Grace Crum Rollins
- Relatives: Gary Rollins (brother); John W. Rollins (uncle)

Richard Randall Rollins (November 5, 1931 – August 17, 2020) was an American billionaire businessman and the chairman of Rollins Inc., the US's largest pest control conglomerate, which includes the Orkin Exterminating Company. Rollins was a veteran of the U.S. Coast Guard.

== Early life ==
R. Randall Rollins (known as "Triple R") was born on November 5, 1931, in Georgia. He was the son of O. Wayne Rollins and Grace Crum Rollins. He had a younger brother, Gary Rollins. Rollins grew up on his grandparents' farm near Ringgold, Georgia. His father and uncle, John W. Rollins, would later move from farming to business ventures. After he graduated high school, Randall worked for his uncle and father and learned company operations. He then served in the United States Coast Guard until 1953.

== Career ==
His father and uncle purchased a radio station in Radford, Virginia, which became the Rollins Broadcasting Company. His uncle also owned the Rollins Leasing company. After his Coast Guard discharge, Randall went to work for both family companies. In 1961, Rollins Broadcasting went public. By 1964, Rollins Broadcasting grew to 10 radio and TV stations. That same year, the company had the fourth-largest outdoor advertising company in the U.S. The company diversified to citrus farms and personal hygiene by acquiring Satin Soft cosmetics.

In 1964, Rollins Broadcasting purchased the Orkin Exterminating Company for $62.4 million in the first leveraged buyout in the history of the U.S. Randall was named the head of Orkin while he continued to work on expanding Rollins Broadcasting. His brother Gary worked alongside him on the family businesses under the umbrella of Rollins Inc. By 1969, Rollins’ revenues had grown to over 106 million.

In 1984, Rollins Inc. split into three companies, all publicly traded. Rollins, Inc. (pest control via Orkin), Rollins Communications (media and advertising), and RPC Energy Services Inc. (oil and gas services). Randall was named the president and chief operating officer of Rollins Communications, the chairman of the board of Rollins Inc., and the chairman of the board, chief executive officer, president, and chief operating officer of RPC Energy Services. In 2001, Marine Products Corporation was a spinoff company from RPC Energy Services. He was also chairman of Marine Products Corporation. The company manufactures fiberglass boats under the Chaparral, Robalo, and Vortex brands. He was also the director of Dover Downs Gaming and Entertainment Inc. and Dover Motorsports.

In 2014, Rollins was listed on The Forbes 400 list. He was ranked No. 225 due to his estimated net worth of $2.7 billion. In August 2020, Forbes estimated his net worth at US$5.1 billion, ranking him 148 on the Forbes 400.

== Philanthropy ==
In 1991, he and his wife, Peggy, established the Peggy and Randall Rollins Foundation, later renamed the Ma-Ran Foundation. The charitable foundation primarily supports organizations and projects pertaining to education, health organizations, community resources, human services, and faith-based initiatives. In July 2016, Randall and Peggy donated $1 million through the Ma-Ran Foundation to create the new Lewes Public Library in Lewes, Delaware. The former Lewes Library was renamed the Margaret H. Rollins Community Center.

Rollins donated to various Atlanta-based organizations, including the Winship Cancer Institute; he also helped establish the Rollins School of Public Health in 1990. In 2018, the R. Randall Rollins Charitable Lead Annuity Trust and the O. Wayne Rollins Foundation issued donations to Children’s Healthcare of Atlanta. In 2019, the foundation donated $65 million to fund the R. Randall Rollins building at Emory. The foundation also has the Candler School of Theology and the O. Wayne Rollins Research Center.

In 2020, Randall and Peggy donated $1 million to the COVID-19 Relief Fund at Beebe Healthcare.

In March 2022, after Randall died in 2020, the Beebe Medical Foundation announced it had received a $3 million gift from the Rollins family to found the R. Randall Rollins Center for Medical Education.

== Controversies ==
In August 2010, the four children of Randall’s brother Gary filed a lawsuit against both Gary and Randall that alleged mismanagement of the children’s trust. His nephew, Glen Rollins, the lead plaintiff married to Danielle, sued over "rightful cash allocations." Glen's three siblings joined him in the lawsuit, as did his mother, Ruthie, who filed for divorce from Gary at about the same time. Randall Rollins' five children took their father's and Gary's side in the suit. Glen and Danielle have also begun divorce proceedings. The family's "pest control empire" is worth about $8 billion.

Following nine years of litigation, the parties reached a confidential settlement agreement.

== Personal life ==
He married Peggy Hastings in 1953, and had six children. While living in Lewes, Delaware, the couple had two eldest children. The family later relocated to Wilmington, DE, before making their home in Atlanta, Georgia. One of his children, Rita Anne Rollins, predeceased Randall. The other Rollins children are Richard, Pamela, Robert, Timothy, and Amy.

He and his wife were members of the Lewes Yacht Club.

Rollins died on August 17, 2020, after a "brief illness," aged 88.
