= Solveig Argeseanu Cunningham =

Global health professor

- Born: Solveig Argeseanu

Academic background
- Education: University of Pennsylvania
- Thesis: Who promotes child well-being? : essays on the importance of the household for child well-being (2006)

Solveig Argeseanu Cunningham is an associate professor of Global Health at Emory University's Rollins School of Public Health with appointments in the Division of Nutrition, the Department of Sociology, and the Department of Epidemiology.

== Education ==
Cunningham has a B.A. in international affairs from the Elliott School of International Affairs (1997) and an M.Sc. in developmental studies from the London School of Economics (2001). She has an M.A. in demography (2003) and a Ph.D. (2006) from the University of Pennsylvania.

== Research ==
Cunningham is known for her research on health. Her work includes investigations into how a doctors' strikes impacts medical outcomes for patients, and the connections between death rates in people and their financial situation. In the United States, Cunning has quantified the rate of childhood obesity, particularly in younger children. Cunningham has examined dietary choices of young children, including research into soda consumption by young children. Her 2022 article in the journal Pediatrics quantified increases in obesity in the United States.

== Selected publications ==
- Cunningham, Solveig A.; Kramer, Michael R.; Narayan, K.M. Venkat (30 January 2014). "Incidence of Childhood Obesity in the United States". New England Journal of Medicine. 370 (5): 403–411. doi:10.1056/NEJMoa1309753. ISSN 0028-4793. PMC 4017620. PMID 24476431.
- Cunningham, Solveig A; Mosher, Aleena; Judd, Suzanne E; Matz, Lisa M; Kabagambe, Edmond K; Moy, Claudia S; Howard, Virginia J (10 February 2017). "Alcohol Consumption and Incident Stroke Among Older Adults". The Journals of Gerontology: Series B. 73 (4): 636–648. doi:10.1093/geronb/gbw153. ISSN 1079-5014. PMC 6018946. PMID 28184880.
- Boundaoui, Nouha; Smith, Emily; Van Hemelrijck, Wanda; Vandenheede, Hadewijch; Argeseanu-Cunningham, Solveig (2018). Data Collection on Health of Foreign-Born People in Belgium. Sage Publications Ltd. doi:10.4135/9781526458766. ISBN 978-1-5264-5876-6.
- Cunningham, Solveig A.; Hardy, Shakia T.; Jones, Rebecca; Ng, Carmen; Kramer, Michael R.; Narayan, K.M. Venkat (1 August 2022). "Changes in the Incidence of Childhood Obesity". Pediatrics. 150 (2). doi:10.1542/peds.2021-053708. ISSN 0031-4005. PMC 9879733. PMID 35789417.
- Cunningham, Solveig Argeseanu; Mehlawat, Urvashi (15 February 2023). "Birthweight: An Early Beacon of Children's Growth!". Indian Pediatrics. 60 (1): 96–97. doi:10.1007/s13312-023-2803-1. ISSN 0974-7559. PMID 36786177. S2CID 256846007.
