= Montego Bay High School =

Location
- 51 Union Street; Montego Bay, St. James; Jamaica
- Coordinates: 18°28′28″N 77°55′09″W

Information
- Other name: Montego Bay High School for Girls
- Type: Public school (government funded)
- Motto: Esse non videri (To be, not to seem)
- Religious affiliation: Anglican
- Established: 1935; 91 years ago
- School code: 08036
- Years offered: 7–13
- Gender: all-girls
- Age range: 10-19
- Enrolment: 813 (2018)
- Student to teacher ratio: 17:1
- Language: English
- Houses: Jeffrey-Smith; Harrison; Denham; Lightbody; Holness; Lindsay
Colours
Green, white and red
- Song: Be thou my Vision by Dallan Forgaill
- Sports: Track and field, Volleyball, Badminton, Table Tennis, Swimming, Netball, Basketball

Montego Bay High School (also known as Montego Bay High School for Girls) is an all-girls high school in Montego Bay, St. James, Jamaica. The school was established in 1935.

== History ==
=== 1935–1955 ===
Montego Bay High School was established in 1935 by the Government of Jamaica to fill the need of an all-girls high school in St. James. It was the first government-owned high school for girls established in the country. The school is owned by the Ministry of Education and administered by a local Board of Management. Prior to the establishment of Montego Bay High School, St. Helena’s High School (a private school for girls run by the Anglican Church) and situated at 46 Market Street in Montego Bay had been closed due to lack of funding. The then Custos of St. James, Sir Francis Kerr-Jarrett, along with Archdeacon E. S. Harrison of the Anglican Church, and the Hon. Phillip Lightbody, sitting member of the Legislative Council for St. James, successfully petitioned the Government to start a school for girls. The Government subsequently purchased the former Beaconsfield Hotel, located at 51 Union Street. It consisted of a two-storey house and outbuildings situated on approximately two acres of land. Because of the name of the property, the school became known as Beaconsfield School and the girls were colloquially called "Beacs" girls. Students from St. Helena were relocated to this new school which was officially named Montego Bay High School for Girls. Archdeacon Harrison became the first board chairman, and the affiliation with the Anglican Church has been maintained to the present day.

The school started with forty students and three teachers, under the leadership of the first headmistress, Miss Blanche Jeffrey-Smith. Students at the time prepared for two British-based examinations, the Junior and Senior Cambridge examinations. The Junior Cambridge was taken at the end of the fourth year and Senior at the end of the fifth year. The school could not field a sufficient number of candidates to warrant its own examination centre, so the girls wrote their examinations at Cornwall College along with the boys from that institution. The Higher School Certificate was introduced in 1949, and the first set of students sat their examinations in 1950. At that time, some of the sixth-form students had classes with the students at Cornwall College for some subjects and a number of boys from that school took classes at Montego Bay High School. The school had no science laboratories at the time, so practical work for the Cambridge Examinations was conducted at Cornwall College. Like many high schools in Jamaica during that period, most of the teachers at the time were expatriates from the United Kingdom. During the 1940s, the government discussed the idea of amalgamating the school with Cornwall College. However, it was decided to allow the school to continue its independent existence. During that decade, the leadership of the school was shared between Miss Ritchie (later Mrs. Croskery), Mrs. Marjorie Grahame, and Mrs. Janet Morrison. However, each headmistress would later hold the post for extended periods. As the student body increased, the need arose for new buildings to be erected. The current Needlework room was built in the forties and provided two classrooms. The present-day second-form block was erected soon after and subsequently, the outdoor stage area made way for the teachers' hostel with two classrooms on the ground floor.

=== 1955–1980 ===
In 1955, two temporary buildings were erected: one of bamboo and the other of corrugated aluminium. The former was called "Tattoo" and the latter the "Oasis". The "Tattoo" was demolished in the late fifties to make way for what is now the Main Building which contains administrative offices, staff room and lounge, chemistry, biology, as well as food and nutrition laboratories, art room, twelve classrooms, sanitary facilities and a large auditorium with a seating capacity of approximately one thousand persons. Mrs. Janet Morrison was the incumbent Headmistress when this building was constructed.

=== 1980–present ===
In the decade of the eighties, the parent-teacher association and past-students association spearheaded the construction of another building and so the aluminum structure gave way to the building which houses a library, physics and computer laboratories, a cafeteria and the bursar’s office, along with sanitary facilities and store-rooms. The Ministry of Education recently added two classrooms to make room for a large number of grade nine students who were admitted in 2019.

== House system ==
Upon initial enrollment in the school, each student is assigned to one of six houses. The house system was implemented in the fifties. Originally there were three houses: Jeffrey-Smith (named after the first Headmistress); Harrison (named after Archdeacon Harrison - the first board chairman); Denham (named after Sir Edward Denham, Governor of Jamaica at the time the school was established). Subsequently, three more houses were added for a total of six: Lightbody (named after Phillip Lightbody, member of the Legislative Council), Holness (named after Florence Holness, a former teacher and alumna); and Lindsey (Named after Helen Lindsey, a past principal and extra-ordinary teacher of mathematics).

== Enrollment ==
The school's official capacity is 800 students. As of the 2018-2019 academic year, there were 813 students enrolled with a staff complement of forty-five (45) teachers, including a guidance counselor and a school nurse.

School Profile
School Year	Enrollment	Student-Teacher Ratio
2018-2019	813	19:1
2017-2018	846	22:1
2016-2017	814	21:1
2015-2016	826	23:1
2014-2015	812	23:1
2013-2014	794	23:1
2012-2013	770	23:1

== Headmistresses and principals ==
- Blanche Jeffrey-Smith (1935–1944)
- Millicent Croskery, née Ritchie, (1944–1947)
- Janet Morrison (1947–1962)
- Marjorie Grahame (1962–1970)
- Helen Lindsay (1970–1978)
- Muriel Crick (acting, 1978–1979)
- Barbara Smith (1979–1996)
- Patricia Lemonias (acting, 1996–1997)
- Faith Clemmings (1997–2009)
- Julian Myers-Coleman (acting, 2009)
- Donna-Marie Redway (2010–2017)
- Gairy Powell (2017–present)

== Notable alumni ==
- Tamika Davis, member of the Jamaican Parliament
- Rose Hudson-Wilkin, British Anglican bishop
- Zaila McCalla, Chief Justice of Jamaica (2007-2018)
- Olive Senior, Jamaican poet and novelist
