= Rollins School of Public Health =

Graduate school of Emory University in Atlanta, Georgia

Coordinates: 33.797211°N 84.322974°W

- Established: 1990; 36 years ago
- Parent institution: Emory University
- Dean: M. Dani Fallin
- Location: Atlanta, Georgia, United States
- Campus: Suburban
- Website: sph.emory.edu

The Rollins School of Public Health (RSPH) is the public health school of Emory University. Founded in 1990, Rollins has more than 1,100 students pursuing master's degrees (MPH/MSPH) and over 150 students pursuing doctorate degrees (PhD). The school comprises six departments: Behavioral, Social, and Health Education Sciences (BSHES), Biostatistics (BIOS), Environmental Health (EH), Epidemiology (EPI), Global Health (GH), and Health Policy and Management (HPM), as well as an Executive MPH program (EMPH).

In addition to pursuing degrees from a single department, students may also participate in joint programs, both within Rollins and in conjunction with other professional schools at Emory (including Nell Hodgson Woodruff School of Nursing, Emory University School of Law, and Goizueta Business School). Unique programs to Rollins are Global Environmental Health, Global Epidemiology, and the joint EH/EPI MSPH program.

One of the founding fathers of Rollins was Dr. David Sencer, Director of the Centers for Disease Control and Prevention (CDC) from 1966 to 1977 and New York City Health Commissioner from 1981 to 1985. In his honor, the David Sencer Scholarship Fund was established at Rollins in 2008. Rollins continues to be closely affiliated with CDC, along with multiple other public health institutions, such as the Emory Global Health Institute.

== Reputation ==
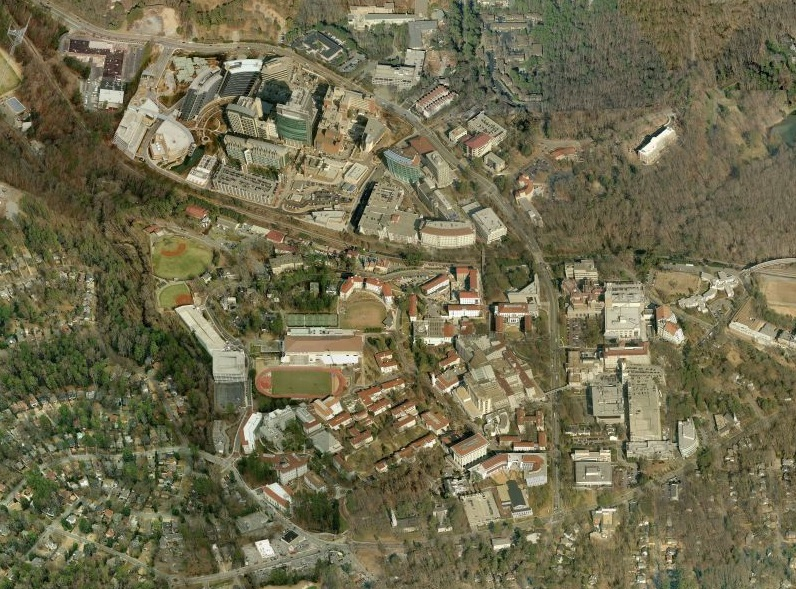
Emory University and Centers for Disease Control and Prevention, Druid Hills, Georgia Aerial Image

In the most recent rankings (2025), Rollins was ranked number 2 among accredited schools and programs of public health by U.S. News & World Report, and is one of two schools of public health founded in the past 50 years to be ranked in the top 12.

== Location ==
Atlanta is commonly referred to as the world's public health capital, and with good reason— the primary office of the CDC is located next door to Rollins, and there are a large number of other public health groups (consulting, NGO, and informatics-related) located across the city, such as Deloitte and CARE (relief agency).

== Notable programs ==
=== GEMMA ===
Global Elimination of Maternal Mortality from Abortion (GEMMA) is a scholarship program where eligible graduate-level students are provided opportunities in developing countries for field research and other practicums related to reproductive health. Students can use the scholarship to aid their research and help publish their findings associated with maternal mortality from abortion.

The GEMMA program was established by RSPH Professor Dr. Roger Rochat and his wife Susan Rochat. The program aims to eradicate maternal deaths associated with abortion.

==== History ====
Physician and epidemiologist Dr. Rochat has worked in more than 40 countries during his 30 years with CDC. His experience has provided him the opportunity to research around 70,000 instances of unsafe abortion and abortion-related deaths. His research motivated Rochat and his wife to set up the GEMMA fund to inspire and support students to research in this field. They believe that through the dissemination of proper awareness for appropriate use of contraception, sex education, and with the provision for legal and safe induced abortion, they could condense nearly all deaths associated with abortion.

==== GEMMA Seminar ====
GEMMA seminar is a public health course that solely focuses on abortion and concentrates on tackling the concerns of abortion involving medical, ethical, legal, human rights, and religious views. This course is taught by Dr. Rochat and Dr. Lathrop with guest lecturers and is available for enrollment each spring.

==== Student Grants ====
The Gemma awards program gives grants up to US$700. Graduate students of Emory University who possess practical research experience can apply for a grant through the GEMMA awards program for activities, events, research, or any programs that contribute to raising awareness and helping to eliminate deaths associated with abortion.

Students can also use the grant to assist them in publishing their research findings or their thesis related to this topic.

==== Events and Collaborations ====
GEMMA provides opportunities for collaboration with such organizations as the World Health Organization, International Planned Parenthood, and Global Doctors for Choice.

Every year GEMMA members actively participate in organizing various events in association with Emory Reproductive Health Association (ERHA) to promote awareness about reproductive health and justice, both at home and abroad. Some past events are listed below:

· Reproductive Justice 101

· Breaking Our Silence: an Abortion Storytelling Event

· Sexual & Reproductive Health Networking Night

· ERHA and GEMMA General Body Meeting

· Sex in the Dark

· Film Screening: 'Reversing Roe'

· Lunch & Learn with Megan Gordon

· Doughnut Sale Fundraise

· ERHA Annual Chocolate Genitalia Sale

== Notable persons ==
- James W. Curran, Emeritus James W. Curran Dean of Public Health, first leader of CDC's AIDS task force
- William Foege, Professor Emeritus at Rollins School of Public Health, American epidemiologist credited for the global eradication of Smallpox
- Walter Orenstein, directed the United States Immunization Program and was senior advisor to the Bill and Melinda Gates Foundation. Currently the Associate Director of the Emory Vaccines Center
- Carlos del Rio, infectious disease expert who led the National AIDS Program in Mexico, Director of the NIH-sponsored HIV Prevention Trials Network, leader in global HIV/AIDS research
- Eri Saikawa, environmental scientist
- Kyle Steenland, epidemiologist, researcher, and professor of environmental health
- Kenneth E. Thorpe, Deputy Assistant Secretary in President Bill Clinton's cabinet, he had a central role in coordinating President Clinton's health care reform proposals.

== Rollins family ==
RSPH was endowed by Randall Rollins, who named it after his father, O. Wayne Rollins, a self-made business entrepreneur and innovator who participated in numerous ventures with his brother, John W. Rollins. Several members of the Rollins family have served on the Emory University Board of Trustees.

On July 9, 2007, the O. Wayne Rollins Foundation and Grace Crum Rollins donated $50 million to RSPH. The donation doubled the school's physical structure, adding 160,000 square feet (15,000 m^{2}). It was one of the largest donations to a public health school in the history of higher education. The expansion was completed in May 2010, and the new building was dedicated on October 6, 2010.

== See also ==
- Epi Info software program
- OpenEpi software program
- Deep Springs International, sponsor of the Gadyen Dlo safe water program that was initially a joint program between Missions of Love and Rollins in Jolivert, Haiti. DSI's National Program Officer, Michael Ritter, a MPH graduate of Rollins.
