= Deep Springs =

Deep Springs may refer to:

- Deep Springs, California, unincorporated community in Inyo County
- Deep Springs College, nontraditional two-year institution located in Deep Springs Valley
- Deep Springs International, sponsor of the Gayden Dlo point of use water treatment program
- Deep Springs Plantation, a mansion in Stoneville, North Carolina
- Deep Springs Valley, valley in the Inyo-White mountain range of California
