= Western Pest Services =

- Industry: Pest control
- Founded: 1928; 98 years ago
- Founder: J.E. Sameth
- Headquarters: Parsippany-Troy Hills, New Jersey, U.S.
- Number of locations: 18
- Area served: New Jersey, New York, Connecticut, Pennsylvania, Delaware
- Parent: Rollins Inc.
- Website: www.westernpest.com

Western Pest Services is a pest control company in the Mid-Atlantic with commercial, residential and fumigation divisions. The company is headquartered in Parsippany, New Jersey and has locations throughout New Jersey, New York, Connecticut, Pennsylvania, and Delaware. The company is a wholly owned subsidiary of Rollins Inc.

== Naming ==
J.E. Sameth considered several names, including Eastern, Western, National and Federal. Sameth named the company by pulling the name “Western” out of a hat.

== History ==
Western was founded by J.E. Sameth prior to the Great Depression in 1928. Sameth was the technician, his sister was the customer service representative, and his father handled sales. Today, the company uses Integrated Pest Management for consumers and industries such as health care, education, and food processing. In 2004, Western Pest Services was acquired by Rollins Inc. and went from being a privately owned company to a public company. Prior to the acquisition, Western Pest Services was ranked as the 8th largest company in the industry.

== Timeline ==
Western started out with the cowboy and cowgirl branding. This was a natural tie with the company name.

In the 1950s the cowgirl was dropped, and they went with the “branding cowboy.” Also, it went from “Western Exterminating Co.” to “Western Termite and Pest Control.”

In the 1970s they dropped the cowboy and went with a “hockey sticks” brand image.

In the 1980s “caring people, caring solutions” was added.

In the 1990s a teal backdrop was tried

In 2005 they switched to their current company branding

At present, Western has 18 branches in five states.

== Industry involvement ==
Western’s founder, J.E. Sameth, was one of the founders of the National Pest Management Association (NPMA), the industry's educational affiliate, in 1933. The NPMA publishes trade material, holds certification conferences, and has state chapters.

Sameth was also one of the six original founders of Copesan in 1958. Copesan was a company formed by small, family-owned companies.

Western’s Commercial division is a member of industry associations, including the American Council on Science and Health, American Institute of Baking, BOMA, and the Greater Philadelphia Hotel Association.
