= Holy Trinity Church, Dalston =

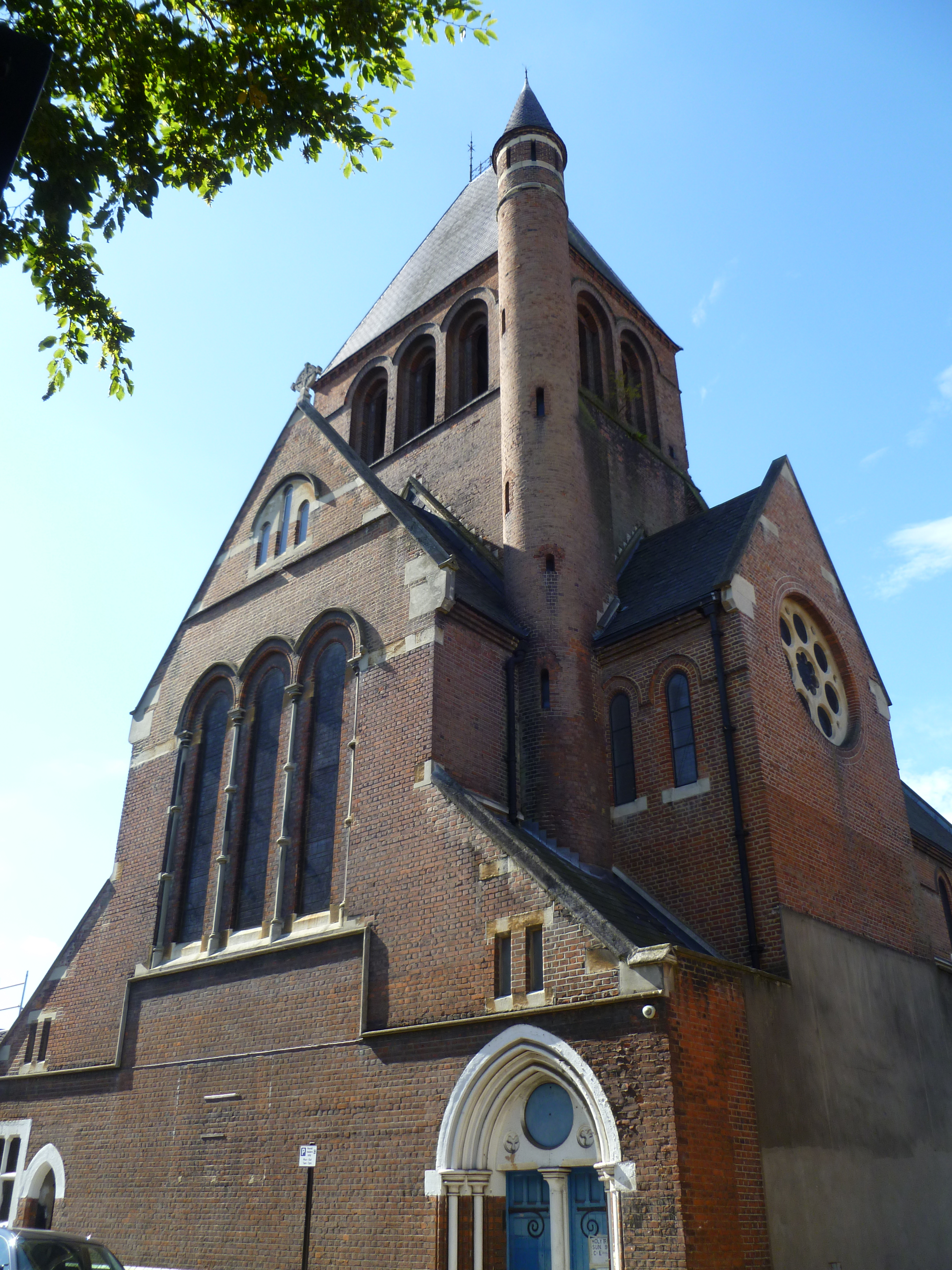
- Holy Trinity Church
- Holy Trinity Church, Dalston
- 51°32′39.6″N 0°4′23.3″W
- Location: London Borough of Hackney
- Country: England
- Denomination: Church of England
- Churchmanship: Liberal Catholic
- Website: Holy Trinity Church website

Architecture
- Architect: Ewan Christian
- Years built: 1879

Administration
- Diocese: Diocese of London
- Parish: Hackney

Clergy
- Vicar: Revd. Laura Joy Luz

Holy Trinity Church, Dalston, also known as the Clowns’ Church, is a Church of England parish church in Beechwood Road in the London Borough of Hackney. It is in the parish of Holy Trinity with St Philip Dalston and All Saints Church, Haggerston (St Philip having been bombed during World War II and demolished some time between 1947 and 1952).

From 1998 to 2014, the vicar was Rose Hudson-Wilkin, who held the roles of Speaker’s chaplain to the House of Commons, priest vicar at Westminster Abbey and chaplain to the Queen.

== History and design ==
Holy Trinity was designed by Ewan Christian – a noted church builder and restorer and architect of the National Portrait Gallery. The main phase of construction took place in 1878-79 and was funded from the proceeds of the sale of St Martin Outwich in the City of London.

It is a Grade II-listed building; its 1975 designation noted both the reputation of its architect and its impressive High Victorian style with continental influences.

It is constructed in red brick in the Early English style and has a slate roof. Inside Holy Trinity is a screen brought from St Philip, Dalston after that church was damaged by bombing in December 1940. The post-war east window of the church has glass by A. F. Erridge.

== The Clowns' Church ==
Holy Trinity is known as the Clowns’ Church for the annual Clowns International service held on the first Sunday in February in honour of Joseph Grimaldi and deceased clowns. The service was established in 1946/7 at St James's Episcopal Chapel in Pentonville Road, where Grimaldi is buried (now Joseph Grimaldi Park). It moved to Holy Trinity in 1959 after St James's was deconsecrated. The service is attended by clowns in full costume and is usually followed by a performance for members of the public.

The vestry of Holy Trinity Church is home to the Clowns Gallery-Museum, which includes the Clown Egg Register.

== External sources ==
- Clowns’ Service in pictures
