= Cancer Causes & Control =

- Discipline: Oncology
- Language: English
- Edited by: Immaculata De Vivo

Publication details
- History: 1990–present
- Publisher: Springer Science+Business Media (Netherlands)
- Frequency: Monthly
- Impact factor: 2.506 (2020)

Standard abbreviations
- ISO 4: Cancer Causes Control

Indexing
- CODEN: CCCNEN
- ISSN: 0957-5243 (print); 1573-7225 (web)
- OCLC no.: 22459434

Links
- Journal homepage

Cancer Causes & Control is a peer-reviewed medical journal published by Springer Science+Business Media, covering research on the epidemiology, causes, and control of cancer. According to the Journal Citation Reports, the journal has a 2020 impact factor of 2.506.
