= Clowns Gallery-Museum =

Clowns Gallery & Archives
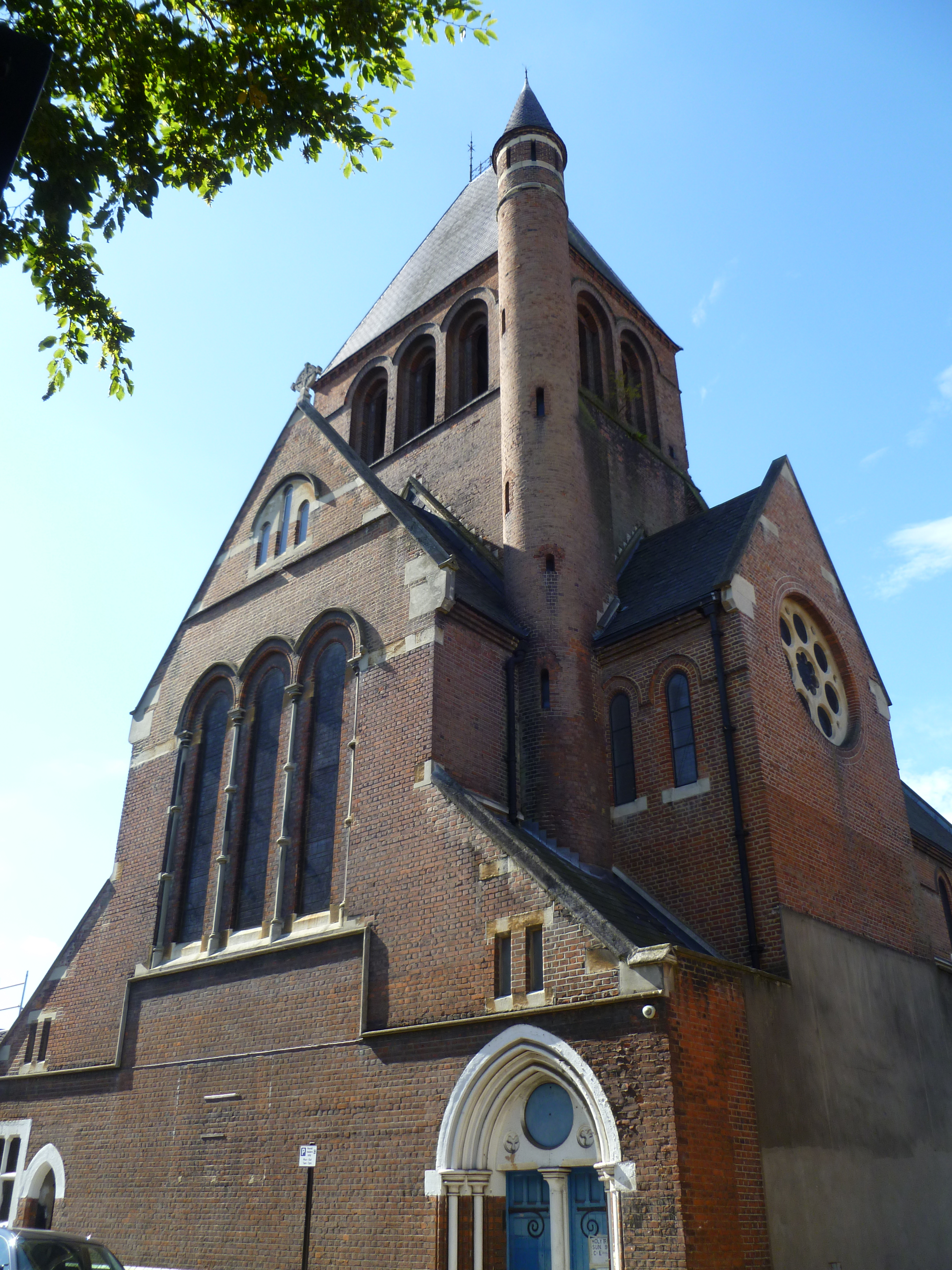
- Holy Trinity Church, Dalston

- Location within London
- Established: 1959; 67 years ago
- Location: Holy Trinity Church, Dalston, England
- Coordinates: 51°32′39.6″N 0°4′23.3″W
- Type: Clowning museum
- Director: Mattie Faint (Mattie the Clown)
- Website: clownsgallery.co.uk

The Clowns Gallery & Archives was originally The Clowns Gallery & Museum, a museum of clowning but is now named The Clowns Gallery & Archives. Established in 1959, the collection contains costumes and props from famous clowns, as well as a reference library, and is home to the Clown Egg Register.

== History ==
The collection was split between the museum's two sites, Holy Trinity Church in Dalston, London, and Wookey Hole in Somerset, England. The museum was established in 1959 in Dalston and the collection was split into a venue in Wookey Hole in 2007. The Dalston museum was situated in what was the vestry of the Holy Trinity Church. It was threatened with closure in 2014 but remained in place. The Wookey Hole museum was begun by Gerry Cottle, vice president of Clowns International.

However, the Dalston museum shut in 2018 due to health and safety issues, and remains closed, and the Wookey Hole collection is also in storage.

== Clown Egg Register ==
The Clown Egg Register is an archive of painted ceramic and hen's eggs that serve as a record of individual clowns' personal make-up designs. The clown egg tradition began in 1946, when Stan Bult, a chemist, and founder of Clowns International, took to drawing the faces of club members and famous clowns onto chicken eggs. The egg gallery was created to forestall the possibility of accidental or intentional plagiarism: an unofficial rule prohibits any two clowns from sharing a single face paint design, with eggs providing a suitably head-shaped mannequin. Real eggs were originally used but were later replaced with ceramic eggs. The collection is no longer open to the public.

== Painters ==
The eggs were painted by Bult himself until 1966, with 450 eggs painted. As these were all chicken eggs, most were broken, with only 24 remaining in the collection. Clowns International continued Bults register, with Janet Webb painting 76 between 1988 and 1994. Kate Stone painted 144 between 1995 and 2009. In addition to the original eggs she produced, she also reproduced 59 of Bult's eggs from photographs. Debbie Smith took over as egg artist between 2010 and 2023, before current egg artist Julie Proctor took over in 2023.

== References in popular culture ==
- A version of the egg museum is a key plot element of the 2012 clown horror film Stitches, starring Ross Noble.
- The museum is mentioned by Spencer Reid in season 13 episode 17 of the American crime drama Criminal Minds.
- The registry is referenced in John Allison's Solver comics storyline "Circus Windows" issue 2.
- A fictional clown egg registry provides a vital clue toward solving a series of murders in a 1968 episode of the British spy series The Avengers.
- A version of Clown Egg is used as a plot point in Terry Pratchett's Men at Arms in the Fools Guild.
