= 1960 Delaware gubernatorial election =

- November 8, 1960
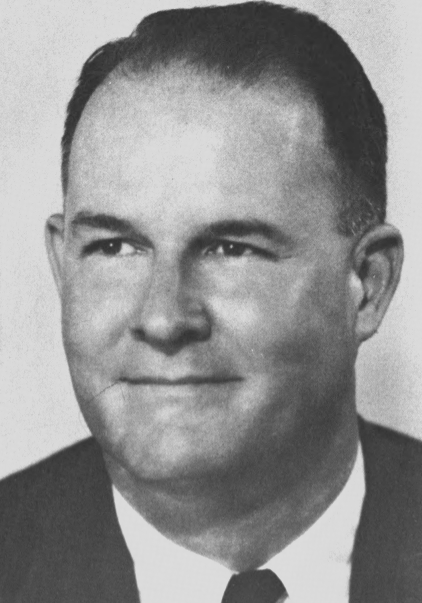

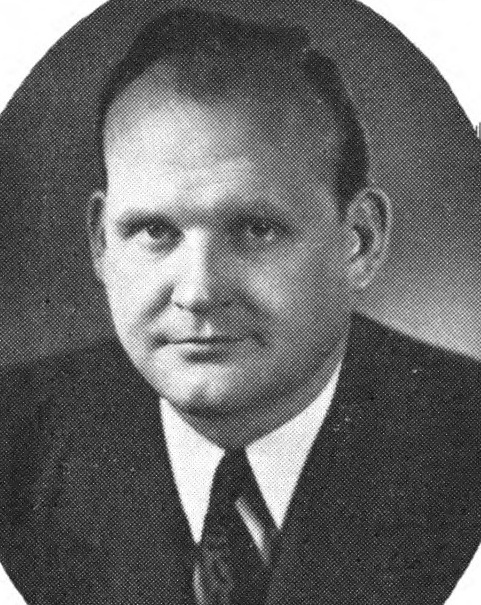
Nominee	Elbert N. Carvel	John W. Rollins
Party	Democratic	Republican
Popular vote	100,792	94,043
Percentage	51.73%	48.27%
- County results Carvel: 50–60%
Governor before election
J. Caleb Boggs
Republican
Elected Governor
Elbert N. Carvel
Democratic

The 1960 Delaware gubernatorial election was held on November 8, 1960.

Incumbent Republican Governor J. Caleb Boggs was term-limited, having served two consecutive terms. Boggs instead ran for the U.S. Senate.

Democratic nominee former governor Elbert N. Carvel defeated Republican nominee John W. Rollins with 51.73% of the vote. This was the first gubernatorial election in Delaware where a single candidate won over 100,000 votes.

== Nominations ==
Nominations were made by party conventions.

=== Democratic nomination ===
The Democratic convention was held on August 25.

==== Candidate ====
- Elbert N. Carvel, former Governor, nominated by acclamation

=== Republican nomination ===
The Republican convention was held on August 31 and September 1.

==== Candidate ====
- John W. Rollins, former Lieutenant Governor

==== Withdrew ====
- David P. Buckson, incumbent Lieutenant Governor

== General election ==
=== Results ===
1960 Delaware gubernatorial election
Party	Candidate	Votes	%	±%
Democratic	Elbert N. Carvel	100,792	51.73%	
Republican	John W. Rollins	94,043	48.27%	
Majority		6,749	3.46%	
Turnout		194,835	100.00%	
Democratic gain from Republican		Swing		

==== By county ====
County	John Rollins Republican		Elbert Carvel Democratic		All Others	
County	#	%	#	%	#	%
Kent	10,192	47.8%	11,108	52.2%	0	0.0%
New Castle	68,921	48.7%	72,598	51.3%	0	0.0%
Sussex	14,930	48.3%	17,086	53.4%	0	0.0%
Totals	94,043	48.3%	100,792	51.7%	0	0.0%

Counties that flipped from Republican to Democratic

- New Castle
- Sussex

== Bibliography ==
- Gubernatorial Elections, 1787-1997. Washington, D.C.: Congressional Quarterly Inc. 1998. ISBN 1-56802-396-0.
- Glashan, Roy R. (1979). American Governors and Gubernatorial Elections, 1775-1978. Meckler Books. ISBN 0-930466-17-9.
