= Rollins, Inc. =

American pest control conglomerate

- Type: Public
- Traded as: NYSE: ROL; S&P 500 component
- Industry: Pest control; Conglomerate
- Founded: 1948; 78 years ago (as Rollins Broadcasting)
- Founders: John W. Rollins; O. Wayne Rollins
- Headquarters: Atlanta, Georgia, U.S.
- Key people: John F. Wilson (chairman); Gary Rollins (chairman emeritus); Jerry E. Gahlhoff, Jr. (CEO)
- Revenue: ▲US$3.39 billion (2024)
- Operating income: ▲US$657 million (2024)
- Net income: ▲US$466 million (2024)
- Total assets: ▲US$2.82 billion (2024)
- Total equity: ▲US$1.33 billion (2024)
- Owner: Rollins family (abt. 35%)
- Number of employees: 20,265 (2024)
- Subsidiaries: Orkin; Western Pest Services
- Website: rollins.com

Rollins, Inc. is a North American pest control company serving residential and commercial clients. Operating globally through its wholly owned subsidiaries, the company provides pest control services and protection against termite damage, rodents and insects to over 2.8 million customers in North America, South America, Europe, Asia, Africa, and Australia, with approximately 22,000 employees from more than 850 locations.

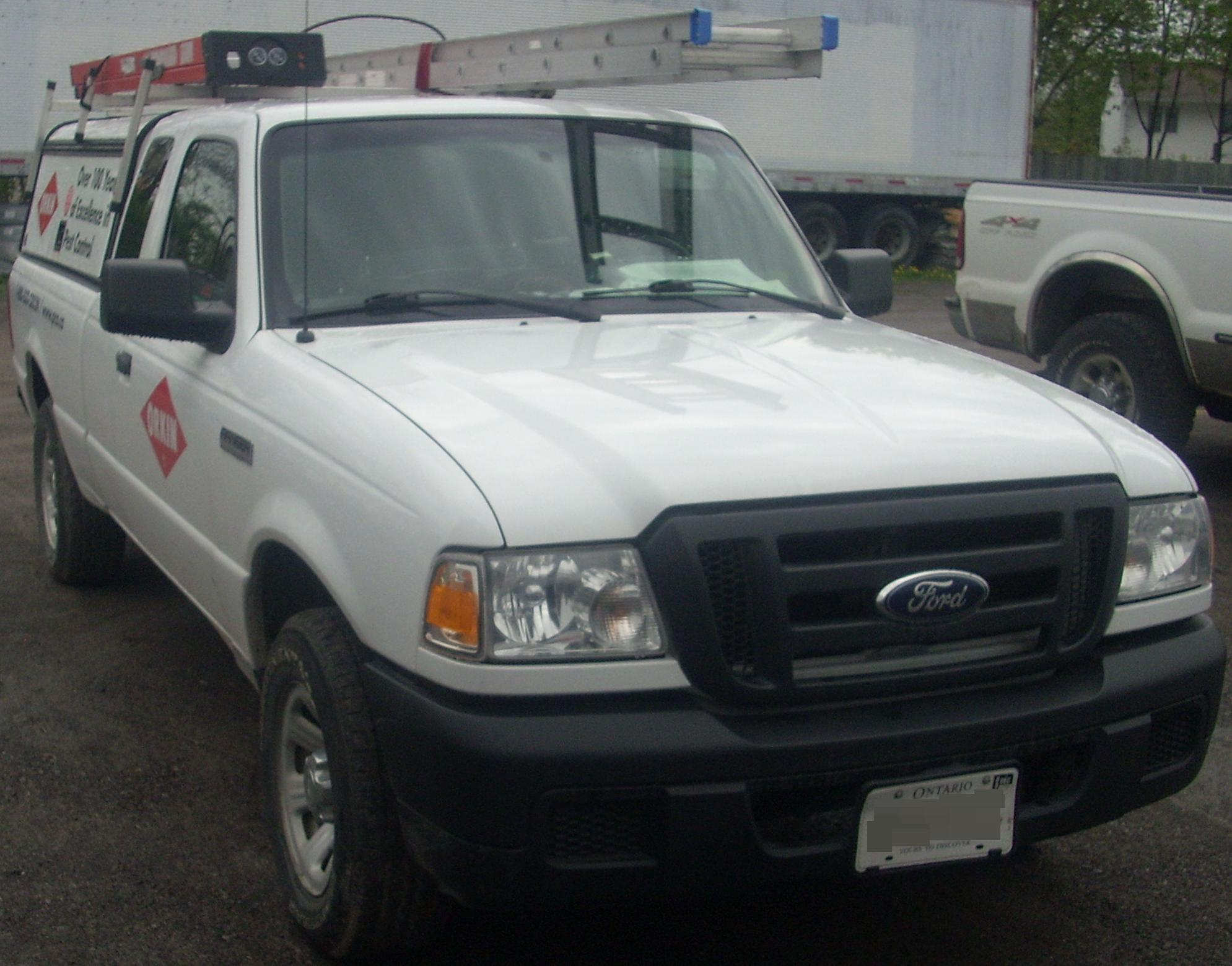
Ford Ranger extended cab outfitted as an Orkin vehicle

== History ==
=== Rollins Broadcasting ===
The company started as Rollins Broadcasting in 1948, when brothers John W. Rollins and O. Wayne Rollins purchased a small radio station based in Radford, Virginia to advertise John's car dealership. By 1961, they owned WNJR in New York, WBEE in Chicago, WGEE in Indianapolis, WCHS-AM-TV in Charleston, West Virginia, WEAR-TV in Pensacola, WRAP in Norfolk, Virginia, WPTZ-TV in Plattsburgh, New York, and WAMS in Wilmington, Delaware. That year, the company went public and was listed on the American Stock Exchange. KDAY in Los Angeles was acquired in 1962 as the company's first West Coast station.

During the 1960s, Rollins began to rapidly diversify. It acquired Tribble Advertising Company, an outdoor advertising firm based in Texas. Then Vendors S.A. of Mexico to expand its billboard advertising business internationally. It further expanded into the cosmetics, building maintenance, and home decorating industries through acquisitions. Rollins even entered the citrus fruit growing business in Florida.

In 1964, Rollins acquired Orkin Exterminating Company for 62.4 million. The company had 800 locations in 29 states at the time. It is remembered as the first leveraged buyout in United States history. Rollins expanded further into pest control by purchasing several smaller firms. By 1966, Orkin had grown to 1,000 offices and the pest control business expanded into Mexico.

=== Rollins, Inc. ===
Now that the business had significantly diversified beyond its broadcasting interests, its name was changed to Rollins, Inc. in 1965. Rollins moved the company from Wilmington, Delaware to Atlanta, Georgia in 1967. It was added to the New York Stock Exchange in 1968 and formed Rollins Protective Services, a home security company, in 1969.

Diversification continued in the early 1970s before slowing by the end of the decade. It acquired a collective buying service before, an oil and gas field service business, and significantly expanded its home decorating arm. In 1975, R. Randall Rollins, son of Wayne Rollins, succeeded his father as company president. In 1977, Rollins began operating a cable television system in New Haven, Connecticut and expanded its Plattsburgh operations to broadcast to Montreal. By the end of the decade, Rollins had sold off its collective buying, home decorating, and building services operations, while Orkin had expanded into lawn care.

In 1984, the company split into three different public units. Rollins Communications was formed to house its TV and radio stations and cable television franchises. Its oil and gas field services business was spun off as RPC Energy Services (NYSE: RES). Rollins, Inc. maintained the company's pest control, lawn care, and security services interests. The Rollins family remained in control of all three companies. Wayne's younger son, Gary Rollins, was named president of Rollins, Inc. The communications company was acquired by Heritage Communications in 1986.

By 1987, additional acquisitions led Rollins, Inc. to control 10% of the pest control industry. It also accounted for 90% of the company's revenue, leading to the $600 million sale of the family's RCI interests. In 1990, Rollins introduced Orkin Plantscaping services, which quickly surpassed the struggling lawn care operations in profitability. After the death of Wayne Rollins in 1991, Randall was named chairperson and chief executive.

Rollins introduced its Orkin franchising operations in 1995. In 1997, the company sold off its landscaping division to ServeMaster and its Rollins Protective Services subsidiary to Ameritech for $200 million.

Gary Rollins, son of O. Wayne Rollins, became CEO in 2001. In 2004, Rollins acquired Western Pest Services for $110 million. It then bought the Industrial Fumigant Company in 2005. Rollins acquired HomeTeam Pest Defense for $137 million in 2008. The company also bought Crane Pest Control in 2009 and Waltham Services of New England in 2010. The Waltham name remained as a separate subsidiary. By 2012, Rollins had surpassed Terminix as the largest firm.in the industry. In 2014, Rollins acquired PermaTreat Pest Control of Fredericksburg, Virginia.

Rollins also entered the wildlife control business when it acquired TruTech in 2010. Then, in 2015, the company purchased Critter Control, the franchisor of more than 110 wildlife control operations in the United States and Canada. This gave Rollins control over the two leading companies in the industry. The company converted its Trutech operations in Phoenix, Tucson, and Las Vegas to the Critter Control name.

Rollins acquired the Georgia-based Northwest Exterminating Company in 2017, maintaining it as a separate business. It purchased OPC Pest Services in 2018, maintaining the company as a separate subsidiary. Clark Pest Control of Stockton, California was bought in 2019. Clark Pest Control of Bakersfield, a separate but related business, was acquired in 2020. In 2021, Rollins built up its offerings in the Southeast by acquiring McCall Service and seven branches from Hulett Environmental Services. All locations were rebranded under the Northwest name. It also purchased Connecticut Pest Elimination.

Randall Rollins died in 2020 and Gary Rollins stepped down as CEO in 2022. Bug House Pest Control of Georgia was acquired in 2022. Rollins acquired Fox Pest Control and Hargrove Pest Solutions in 2023. Hargrove was transitioned to the Northwest Exterminating name. Rollins acquired Utah-based Saela Pest Control in 2025. The company's 2025 revenue of $3.8 million surpassed Rentokil for the first time since its 2022 merger with Terminix, putting it back on top of the pest control industry. In April 2026, it announced the purchase of Romex Pest Control of Utah.

== International ==
=== Canada ===
In 1999, Rollins purchased PCO Services Inc, significantly expanding Orkin's presence in Canada. PCO later began operating under the Orkin Canada name.

=== Australia ===
Rollins expanded into Australia with the purchase of Allpest in 2014. Soon after, the company also purchased Statewide Pest Management of Victoria. In 2016, Murray Pest Control of South Australia and Scientific Pest Management were acquired in 2016. Adams Pest Control was acquired in 2020.

=== United Kingdom ===
In 2016, the company acquired Safeguard Pest Control and Environmental Services Limited, operating in greater London and Southeastern England. This was Rollins' first company-owned operation in the United Kingdom. Rollins continued its expansion by purchasing AMES Group Limited of Birmingham, Kestrel Pest Control Limited of Eastleigh, and Guardian Pest Control of Lincoln in 2018.

In 2020, Rollins acquired two environmentally friendly companies: Albany Environmental Services Ltd. of central London and Van Vynck Environmental Services of Essex. In 2022, the company purchased NBC Environment of Norfolk, Europest Environmental Services of Wales, Pest proof of Manchester, and the Enfield-based Integrated Pest Management. Rollins also bought Vermatech of Oxfordshire in 2023 as well as Bird & Pest Solutions Limited of Kent and Beaver Pest Control in 2024. With the acquisition of Beaver, Orkin UK now had over 450 employees and was considered the second largest pest control operation in the United Kingdom.

== Brands ==
The company is mainly known for the Orkin name. It has also established Orkin Canada, Orkin Australia, and Orkin United Kingdom. There is also a collection of subsidiaries that are maintained as speciality brands:

In the United States, Rollins has Clark Pest Control in California and Northwest Nevada; Crane Pest Control in northern California and the San Francisco Bay Area; Critter Control; Fox Pest Control; HomeTeam Pest Defense; Industrial Fumigant Company; MissQuito based in Marietta, Georgia; Northwest Exterminating; OPC Pest Services of Kentucky; PermaTreat in Virginia; Romex Pest Control in Texas, Oklahoma, Louisiana, and Mississippi; Saela in the Pacific Northwest, Mountain West, and Midwestern United States; TruTech; Waltham Services of New England; and Western Pest Services in the Northeast.

Orkin Australia operates the Allpest, Murray Pest Control, Scientific Pest Management, Statewide Pest Control, Adams Pest Control, and Protectant Pest Management brands.

Orkin United Kingdom maintains the Albany Pest Control, Beaver Pest Control, Guardian Legionella Services, NBC Environment, and Safeguard Pest Control brand names.

Rollins also operates Aardwolf Pestkare in Singapore.
