= All Saints Church, Haggerston =

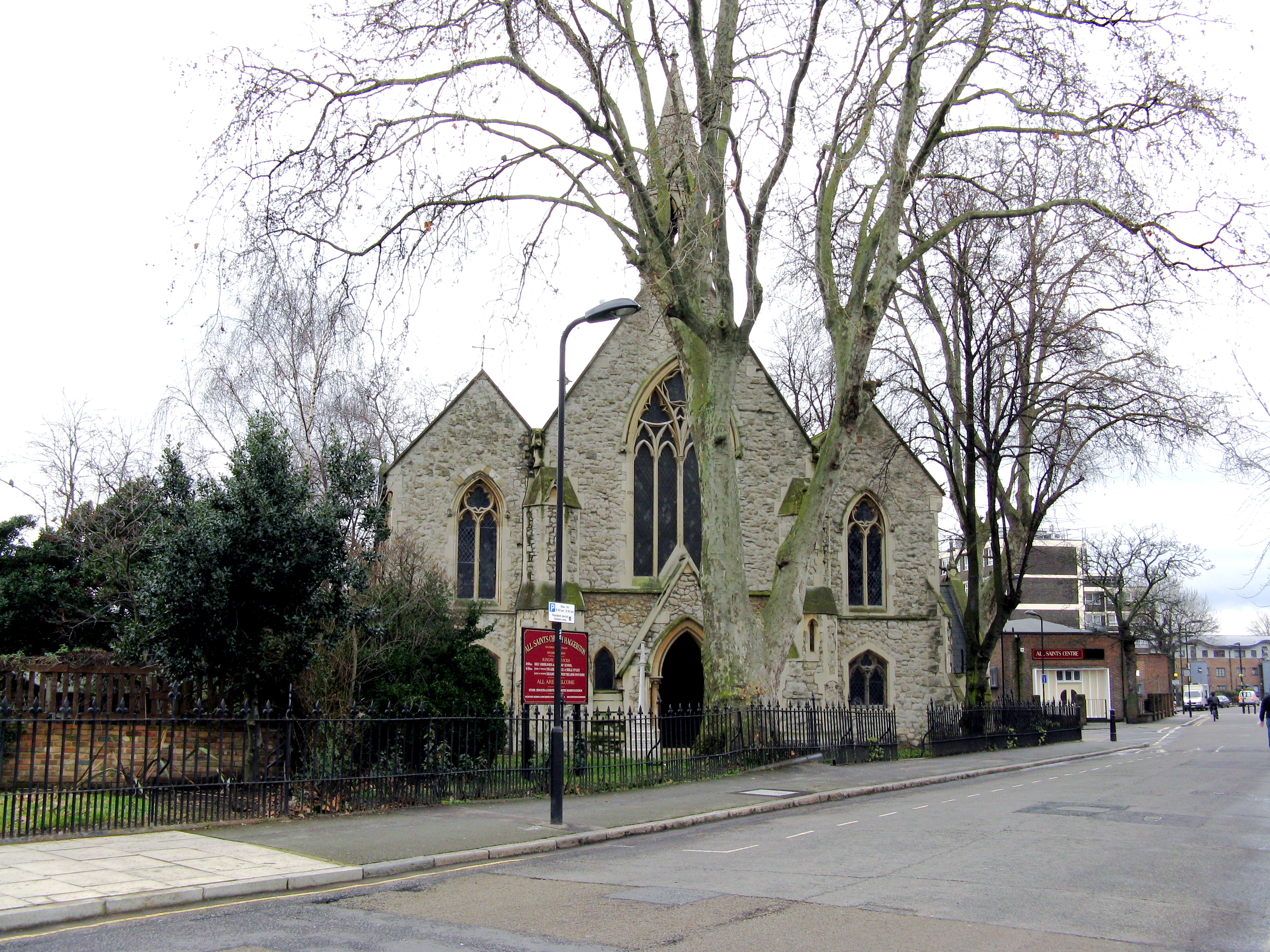
- All Saints Church photo: Dr Neil Clifton, geograph.org.uk
- All Saints Church, Haggerston
- 51.5391°N 0.0734°W
- Location: London Borough of Hackney
- Country: England
- Denomination: Church of England
- Churchmanship: Liberal Catholic
- Website: www.trinitysaintsunited.co.uk

Architecture
- Architect: Philip Hardwick
- Style: Gothic
- Years built: 1856

Administration
- Diocese: Diocese of London
- Parish: Hackney

Clergy
- Vicar: Revd. Laura Joy Luz

All Saints Church, Haggerston, also Church of All Saints, is an Anglican church in Livermere Road, near the junction with Haggerston Road, in Haggerston in London Borough of Hackney, east London. It is part of a parish with Holy Trinity Church and St Philip Dalston (demolished after bombing in World War II).

== History and design ==
All Saints was designed in the Gothic style by Philip Hardwick – best known as architect of the now demolished Euston Arch and the original Birmingham Curzon Street.

Constructed of Kentish rag with ashlar dressings, it was built between 1855–56. The church was extended by T.E. Knightley, probably in the early 1860s and due to growth in the congregation, with aisles remodelled and galleries added.

It has been extensively repaired, first following a fire and then war damage. Inside, the church is plastered and painted and its Grade II listing notes that the interior is: “curiously old-fashioned for its date and survives remarkably completely”.

== The church today ==
Today, All Saints is part of Albion Square Conservation Area, along with neighbouring residential properties, Albion Square itself and Stonebridge Common.

From 1998 to 2014, the vicar was the Revd Rose Hudson-Wilkin, who also held the roles of Speaker’s chaplain to the House of Commons, priest vicar at Westminster Abbey and chaplain to the Queen Elizabeth II.

The Church today is led by Rev Laura Luz and is a United Benefice together with Holy Trinity Dalston Holy Trinity Church, Dalston
