= Carlos del Rio =

Mexican-American physician

- Born: August 28, 1959 (age 67); Mexico
- Occupations: Physician, medical researcher
- Years active: 1983–present

Carlos del Rio (born August 28, 1959, in Mexico) is a distinguished professor of medicine at Emory University School of Medicine. He is also a professor of global health and epidemiology at the Rollins School of Public Health of Emory University, executive associate dean for Faculty and Clinical Affairs at Emory University School of Medicine and co-director of the Emory Center for AIDS Research. He is a member of the National Academy of Medicine and was elected as its foreign secretary in 2020. In 2022, del Rio became president of the Infectious Diseases Society of America. He was elected to the American Academy of Arts and Sciences in 2022.

== Early life and education ==
Del Rio received his medical degree from Universidad La Salle in his native Mexico in 1983. He then completed a residency in internal medicine and a fellowship in infectious diseases at Emory University.

== Career ==
In 1989, del Rio returned to Mexico, where he served as executive director of the National AIDS Council of Mexico from 1992 to 1996. He returned to Emory in November 1996, where he began practicing in 1999. He served as chief of the Emory Medical Service at Grady Memorial Hospital from 2001 to 2009.

=== COVID-19 pandemic ===
Del Rio has advised municipal, state, and national leaders during the COVID-19 pandemic. He was a member of an advisory council to Atlanta Mayor Keisha Lance Bottoms and led the COVID-19 Health & Safety Task Force for the Atlanta Opera. He was a consultant for Tyler Perry, helping design and implement protocols for Tyler Perry Studios productions. Del Rio appeared with Perry in “COVID-19 Vaccine and the Black Community: A Tyler Perry Special,” a half-hour news special that premiered on BET on January 28, 2021.

Nationally, del Rio advised college athletic programs as a member of the NCAA COVID-19 Advisory Panel. He also serves on the national advisory committee of the COVID Collaborative, which focuses on developing consensus recommendations and engaging with U.S. leaders on effective policy and coronavirus response.

Del Rio was an investigator on the Moderna COVID-19 vaccine clinical trial.

== Honors and awards ==
Among many awards del Rio was selected as a 2016 recipient of the Ohtli Award, one of the highest awards given by the Government of Mexico to recognize and honor Mexican, Mexican-American or Latino leaders whose efforts have contributed significantly to the wellbeing, prosperity and empowerment of Mexican communities abroad. In 2021 he was selected by the Carnegie Corporation as a "Great Immigrant, Great American".

== Research ==
del Rio's research focuses on access to and use of healthcare services among Americans with HIV/AIDS.
