= St Andrew's Church, West Bromwich =

Coordinates: 52.5244°N 2.0062°W

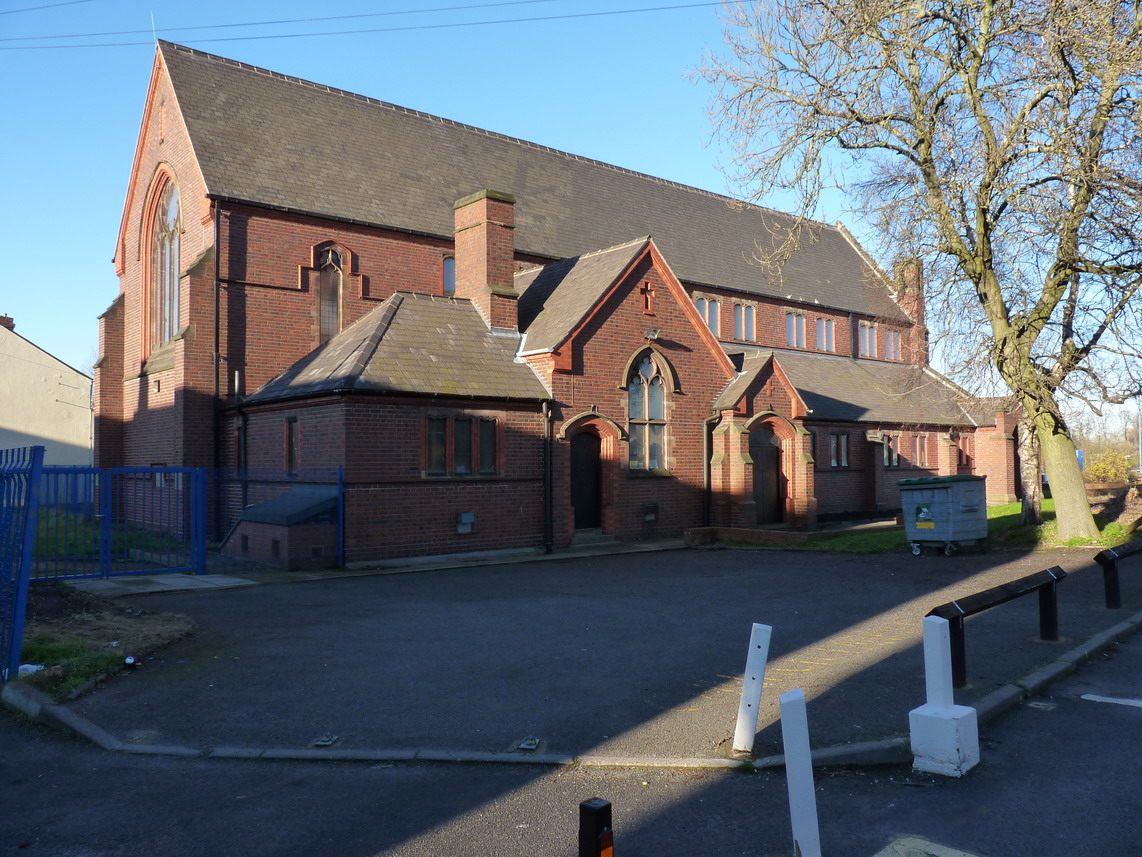
- St Andrew's Church, West Bromwich
- St Andrew's Church, West Bromwich
- Location: West Bromwich
- Country: England
- Denomination: Church of England and Methodist Church
- Website: https://www.facebook.com/StAndrewsWestBromwich/

Architecture
- Groundbreaking: 1915
- Completed: 1924

Administration
- District: Wolverhampton and Shrewsbury District
- Diocese: Diocese of Lichfield
- Deanery: West Bromwich
- Parish: The Parish of St. Andrew's-with-Christ Church, West Bromwich

Clergy
- Vicar: The Revd Graham Wigley

St. Andrew's Church, West Bromwich, England is part of both the Church of England and the Methodist Church through an arrangement known as a local ecumenical partnership. Members of both traditions worship together and play a part in the life of both the Church of England and the Methodist Church throughout West Bromwich. The church is situated at the junction of Dudley Street and Carter's Green. The postcode is B70 9LR.

== History ==
In 1869 a day school was opened in Old Meeting Street, West Bromwich, and the buildings were soon used for Sunday worship. The Parish of St. Andrew, West Bromwich was created in 1879 as part of Lichfield Diocese, with worship continuing on the premises in Old Meeting Street until the 1920s.

In 1915, work started on a new church building at Carter's Green. The First World War prevented much work being done and the official foundation stone was not laid until 1922. The first part of the building was completed in 1924 and consecrated for worship the following year. Just before the Second World War, two bays and a baptistry were completed and consecrated on 21 January 1940.

In 1982, work was completed to create a social area, kitchen and other facilities, and in 1998 a coffee lounge was created alongside the kitchen. Among recent developments has been the addition, in 2015, of 74 photovoltaic panels (solar panels) on the roof, undertaken in partnership with Power for Good Co-operative Ltd.

== The Parish ==
The title of the parish is formally "The Parish of St. Andrew's-with-Christ Church, West Bromwich". Christ Church was an imposing building on High Street, now demolished. In 1988 the parish of Christ Church was divided between the Anglican parishes of The Good Shepherd with St. John, St. Philip's and St. Andrew's. The site where Christ Church stood is within St. Andrew's parish boundary and hence this parish's expanded full name.

== The Ecumenical Partnership ==
Swan Village Methodist Church and St. Andrew's had shared in joint services for many years. When the Methodist church building became difficult to maintain, the congregation decided to join together with the Anglican congregation in the St. Andrew's building. The arrangement was further established in 1988 with a formal Sharing Agreement. Funds from both churches were used to build the extension, including an upstairs room for meetings - the Cygnet Room.

In 2002, the joint congregation signed a Declaration of Intent for Ecumenical Partnership, and there is now fully a Partnership Congregation.

St. Andrew's is also host to Forward in Faith Ministries, a church of Zimbabwean origin and tradition (with no connection with the Anglican organisation of the same name).

== Staff ==
The ordained clergy at St. Andrew's is currently the Revd. Graham Wigley (Vicar).
