= Keith, Georgia =

Unincorporated community in the state of Georgia

Coordinates: 34°55′05″N 85°02′31″W

Keith is an unincorporated community in Catoosa County, in the U.S. state of Georgia.

== History ==
A post office was established at Keith in 1881, and remained in operation until it was discontinued in 1907. Freeman L. Keith served as first postmaster in the community to which he added his name.
