= Deep Springs International =

Deep Springs International (DSI) is a US nonprofit corporation, headquartered in Léogâne, Haiti, which supports the establishment and expansion of Gadyen Dlo social enterprises. Gadyen Dlo has been produced and distributed in Haiti since 2002, originally supported by Emory University and the US Centers for Disease Control.

Gadyen Dlo (Haitian Creole for "Water Guardian") is a Haitian produced 0.7% sodium hypochlorite liquid solution used to chlorinate drinking water at "point of use." Gadyen Dlo is produced at four sites throughout Haiti (West, Northwest, North, and South Departments). Gadyen Dlo is distributed to households in refillable bottles, preferably along with safe water storage containers (5 gallon plastic buckets with taps, lids, and instructions with pictures and Creole).

Several studies by MIT and Emory University have consistently shown that 65 – 85% of households had positive chlorine residual at the time of an unannounced visit. An evaluation in 2007 revealed 76% of tests conducted by technicians showed positive chlorine residual, and there was no significant decrease in correct use after more than three years of families’ entrance into the program. An independent evaluation in 2010 among 706 children under 5 documented a reduction in diarrhoeal disease incidence of 51%.

== Household distribution ==
As of November 2010, the Gadyen Dlo household distribution program reaches almost 40,000 households and an estimated 20,408 children under 5 with continuous provision of Gadyen Dlo. These households are located primarily in rural areas throughout eight of the ten departments of Haiti. There are four chlorine production sites, fifteen distinct project sites, and a total of 230 distributors throughout all of these sites. Gadyen Dlo works with a variety of models in which distributors are compensated through structures ranging from full-time employees to part-time employees who conduct other community health services to vendors who simply resell products for a margin. These programs are supported by INGOs, churches, individuals, and corporate donors.

== Wholesale distribution ==
In 2010 alone, the Wholesale Program has delivered 13,669 L (3,611 gallons) of Gadyen Dlo to treat 48,505,526 L (12,813,805 gallons) of water. These deliveries have been made to and distributed by partners including DINEPA (Haiti's Ministry of Water and Sanitation), UNICEF, United Nations Stabilization Mission in Haiti (MINUSTAH), and Samaritan's Purse. Additionally, 4,541 household safe water storage containers have been delivered to these partners, which will serve 20,889 Haitians. These distributions are typically accompanied by a training session for the partner organization's staff and distributors on hygiene promotion, distribution methods, and effective use of Gadyen Dlo.

== Dispensers ==
In partnership with Innovations for Poverty Action and Harvard University, DSI is implementing a chlorine dispensers pilot project in the Grand-Goâve commune in Haiti that dispenses Gadyen Dlo "at source."

== Press ==
In addition to being the 2008 Templeton Freedom Awards recipient for Social Entrepreneurship, DSI and Gadyen Dlo have been recently recognized in the following media outlets:

- Bringing Safe Water to Haiti, Access on Public Radio,
- The GeDUNK (Grove City College Alumni Magazine)
- The Pittsburgh Tribune-Review
- Emory University (Alumni Magazine)
- Essence Magazine
- UNICEF and UNICEF TV
- Georgia Tech (Alumni Magazine)
- Yahoo! Associated Content
- Pittsburgh Post Gazette
- Pittsburgh Business Times

== Partners ==
In addition to working with many individual donors, DSI has implemented Gadyen Dlo programs with INGOs (including UNICEF, Caritas, Spanish Red Cross, American Red Cross, Save the Children, Samaritan's Purse, Tearfund, Population Services International, Catholic Relief Services, and Innovations for Poverty Action), several religious organizations (including CINCH (Central INdiana Churches for Haiti)), and US educational institutions (including Emory University's Rollins School of Public Health, the University of Miami / Project Medishare, and the University of California at Berkeley). DSI's corporate partners have included Nokia, Digicel, LANXESS, NOVA Chemicals, and PPG Industries.

== See also ==
See also the World Health Organization's Background document for WHO Guidelines for Drinking-Water Quality.
