= Kyle Steenland =

American epidemiologist (born 1946)

- Born: November 5, 1946 (age 79)
- Education: Stanford University, University at Buffalo, University of Pennsylvania, University of Cincinnati
- Scientific career
- Fields: Epidemiology
- Workplaces: Emory University
- Thesis: The use of city directories as a source of occupational data in a case-control study of bladder cancer in Hamilton County, Ohio (1985)

Kyle Steenland (born November 5, 1946) is an American epidemiologist and professor in the department of environmental health epidemiology at Emory University's Rollins School of Public Health.

== Education ==
Steenland received a BA in history from Stanford University in 1968, a PhD in history from the University at Buffalo in 1974, a PhD in epidemiology from the University of Pennsylvania in 1985, and an MS in mathematics from the University of Cincinnati in 1989.

== Career ==
Prior to joining Emory's Rollins School of Public Health in 2002, Steenland worked at the National Institute for Occupational Safety and Health in Cincinnati for 20 years. As of 2013, he was also training researchers in Chile and Peru. He has lectured internationally on environmental health epidemiology.

== Research ==
Steenland is known for his research on various carcinogens, including welding, ethylene oxide, diesel fumes, silica, and dioxin. His research also has focused on pesticides and neurodegenerative diseases, adult lead exposure and cancer, and PFOA and various diseases. He led what is believed to be the first meta-analysis of Alzheimer's disease incidence by race, which concluded that black Americans are 64 percent more likely than white Americans to develop Alzheimer's disease, after adjusting for gender, age, and education level.
