= Paolo Boffetta =

Italian epidemiologist (born 1958)

- Born: July 19, 1958 (age 68); Turin, Italy
- Education: University of Turin
- Known for: Research on cancer epidemiology
- Scientific career
- Fields: Epidemiology
- Workplaces: Stony Brook University, University of Bologna

Paolo Boffetta (born July 19, 1958) is an Italian-American epidemiologist whose research addresses cancer and other chronic diseases, with particular attention to the role of occupation, environment, alcohol, smoking, and nutrition in disease development and outcome, and their interaction with host factors.

== Career ==
A video of Boffetta discussing his research with the World Trade Center Health Program to reconstruct first responders' exposure to carcinogens during the September 11 attacks

In 1990, Boffetta moved to Lyon, France, to join the International Agency for Research on Cancer, IARC, first as medical officer until 1994 and later as chief of the Unit of Environmental Cancer Epidemiology.

He was also a visiting scientist in the Division of Cancer Epidemiology and Genetics at the US National Cancer Institute in Washington, and a foreign adjunct professor in the Department of Medical Epidemiology and Microbiology and Tumour Biology Centre at the Karolinska Institutet, Stockholm, Sweden.

In 2003 he was appointed professor at the University of Heidelberg, Germany and Division Chief at the German Cancer Research Center (DKFZ), He returned to IARC in Lyon in 2004 to become group head and coordinator of the Genetics and Epidemiology Cluster.

From 2010 to 2020, Boffetta was a professor at the Icahn School of Medicine at Mount Sinai, where he led the development of Population Sciences at the Tisch Cancer Institute. In 2020, he joined Stony Brook University, where he is a professor in the Department of Family, Population & Preventive Medicine and founding Associate Director for Population Sciences at the Stony Brook Cancer Center. He has also been a professor in the Department of Medical and Surgical Sciences at the University of Bologna since 2018.

He is an adjunct professor at the Department of Epidemiology, Harvard School of Public Health. at the Department of Medicine, Vanderbilt University,

Boffetta served as vice president of the International Prevention Research Institute in Lyon from 2009 to 2013. He regularly serves as chair or member of national and international committees, including review committees of the US National Institutes of Health and the National Academy of Sciences, and he is a fellow of several Academies including the European Academy of Cancer Sciences and the New York Academy of Medicine. Among other awards, in 2023 the President of the Italian Republic bestowed upon him the title of Commander of the Order of Merit of the Italian Republic for Scientific Merit.

In 2013, he was offered the position of Director of France's national center for research in epidemiology and public health, but following criticisms about his role as industry consultant in a limited number of projects, he withdrew the acceptance of the offer.

== Research ==
Boffetta's research focuses on environmental risk factors for cancer. He has been involved in several international research collaborations and has served as a founding member or executive committee member of multiple research consortia, including Interlymph – the Non-Hodgkin's Lymphoma consortium (2001–08), the ILCCO – Lung cancer consortium (2003–), the INHANCE – Head and neck cancer consortium (2004–), the PanC4 – Pancreatic cancer consortium, the StoP Project – Stomach cancer, and the ILCEC – Liver cancer consortium.

=== Molecular epidemiology ===
He has conducted in cohort studies and case-control studies of molecular epidemiology across a range of organs and countries and served as chair of the Molecular Epidemiology Group of the American Association for Cancer Research from 2008 to 2009.

=== World Trade Center responder research ===
Since 2010, Boffetta has led research into cancer risk among rescue and recovery workers exposed to toxic materials at Ground Zero following the September 11 attacks, comparing responders' cancer risk over time against the general population. According to the wire service UPI, a study he co-led found that responders who had greater exposure at the World Trade Center site faced nearly three times the rate of lung cancer more than a decade after 2001, with researchers concluding that further work was needed to identify which specific carcinogens at the site drove the increased risk. Local outlet TBR News Media also reported that Boffetta launched a separate project examining whether Long Island residents were exposed to carcinogens through drinking water linked to where they had lived, tracking the group over time to assess health impacts, and reported that he was concurrently studying clonal hematopoiesis of indeterminate potential a symptomless condition linked to elevated leukemia and cardiovascular disease risk in World Trade Center responders.

=== Citation metrics and recognition ===
Boffetta's H-index is 147 on Web of Science and 216 on Google Scholar, and, with more than 1700 peer-reviewed publications, he has been listed among the top 20 Italian scientists. and has been included in the Clarivate list of highly cited researchers since 2015. His research has been quoted more than 250,000 times.

== Media ==
Boffetta has disclosed conflicts of interest on several scientific publications pertaining to a variety of hazards, including asbestos, benzene, and arsenic.

In 2011, Boffetta disclosed funding from the Chlorine Chemistry Division of the American Chemistry Council on an epidemiological review investigating cancer risk associated with exposure to 2,3,7,8-Tetrachlorodibenzodioxin (TCDD), a contaminant in Agent Orange, an herbicide used in the Vietnam War.

In 2013, an investigative report published by Le Monde described controversies regarding Boffetta’s research career as a paid consultant.

In 2024, Boffetta disclosed a financial relationship with the Arsenic Science Task Force, an industry group funding research on the health effects of arsenic.
