= O. Wayne Rollins =

American businessman (1912–1991)

- Born: Orville Wayne Rollins; 1912; Ringgold, Georgia, US
- Died: 1991 (aged 78–79)
- Occupation: Businessman
- Known for: Founder of Rollins Inc.
- Spouse: Grace Crum Rollins
- Children: Gary Rollins; Randall Rollins
- Relatives: John W. Rollins (brother)

Orville Wayne Rollins (1912–1991) is the co-founder, with his younger brother John W. Rollins, of Rollins Inc., the US's largest pest control conglomerate.

== Early life ==
Rollins was born in Ringgold, Georgia, in 1912, the son of John William Rollins and Claudia Nance Rollins, a farmer father and a schoolteacher mother. He graduated from Ringgold High School in 1930.

== Career ==
Rollins worked for Standard-Coosa-Thatcher, a textile mill in Chattanooga, Tennessee, for 15 years, then for the Hercules Power Company as a TNT supervisor.

He returned to Ringgold in 1945, and with his wife and younger brother began to rebuild a mineral springs resort. He then started a radio station to provide cheaper advertising for his brother's Virginia automobile dealership. Rollins Broadcasting was formed in 1948, and grew to control ten radio and four television stations.

In 1964, with company annual revenues of $9 million, he borrowed $60 million in the first leveraged buyout in the US to buy Orkin from its family owners, and move into the pest control business.

In 1982, Rollins received the Golden Plate Award of the American Academy of Achievement. In 1986, he received a Horatio Alger Award for his "rags-to-riches" life story.

== Personal life ==
He was married to Grace Crum Rollins. She was born on September 20, 1910, and died on August 8, 2009, aged 98.

He had two sons, Gary Rollins and Randall Rollins.
