= Immaculata De Vivo =

Molecular epidemiologist

Immaculata De Vivo is a molecular epidemiologist and professor at Harvard TH Chan School of Public Health. She is also the Editor-in-Chief of the scientific journal Cancer Causes & Control.

== Background ==
Immaculata De Vivo was born in Sarno, Italy and migrated to United States in 1970 She earned her bachelor's degree at St. John's University in 1986, then proceeded for her MPH and PhD degrees at Columbia University New York in 1991 and 1993 respectively. De Vivo was a postdoctoral fellow at UC Berkeley from 1993 to 1995 and at Stanford University from 1995 to 1998.

== Research ==
De Vivo's is known for her work on telomere length and disease risk, with special emphasis on risk of cancer development. Her work on the impact of lifestyle on disease development especially cancer is noteworthy.
