= John W. Rollins =

American politician (1916–2000)

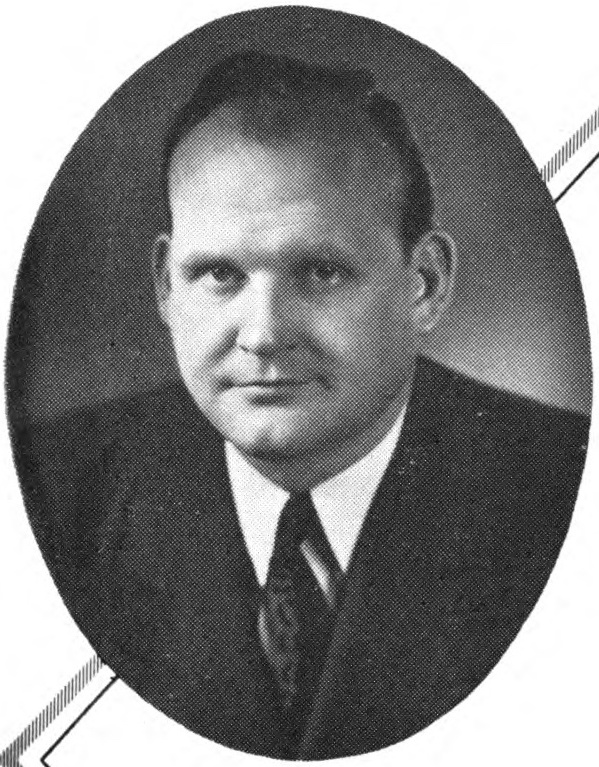
- Rollins circa 1955

14th Lieutenant Governor of Delaware
- In office January 20, 1953 – January 15, 1957
- Governor: J. Caleb Boggs
- Preceded by: Alexis I. du Pont Bayard
- Succeeded by: David P. Buckson

Personal details
- Born: August 24, 1916 Keith, Georgia, U.S.
- Died: April 4, 2000 (aged 83) Fairfax, Delaware, U.S.
- Party: Republican
- Parent(s): John William Rollins; Claudia Nance Rollins
- Relatives: O. Wayne Rollins (brother)
- Occupation: Businessman

John William Rollins (August 24, 1916 – April 4, 2000) was an American businessman and politician from Greenville, Delaware. He was a member of the Republican Party and served as the 14th Lieutenant Governor of Delaware. He founded or acquired nine companies, mostly in the automotive and communication sectors, all traded on the New York Stock Exchange.

== Early life and family ==
John W. Rollins was born in Keith, Georgia, the son of John William Rollins and Claudia Nance Rollins, a farmer father and a schoolteacher mother.

He attended school in a one-room schoolhouse nine miles away in Ringgold, Georgia. In 1928, Rollins's father fell ill and the 12-year-old boy accepted additional responsibilities on the family farm. He worked hard to help his mother provide for the family. As a child, he had an entrepreneurial spirit and tried his hand at an early age selling door to door with things such as bedspreads. In the aftermath of the Great Depression, he left the family farm in Ringgold and moved to Philadelphia. His career was a series of entrepreurial ventures ultimately ending up with the formation of 9 NYSE firms and other business ventures.

== Personal life ==
He was married three times, to Kitty Jacob, Linda Kuechler, and Michele Metrinko, and had ten children including John W. Jr., James, Catherine, Patrick, Ted, Jeff, Michele, Monique, Michael and Marc, as well as eleven grandchildren, John III, Jamie, Fontayne, Charlie, Rachel, Katie, Sarah, Emma, Kaitlyn, William, and Morgan.

== Business career ==
After World War II, Rollins and his wife Kitty moved to Lewes, Delaware, where he opened a Ford dealership. Rollins aggressively expanded his business by buying other dealerships in Maryland and Virginia. During this time, he also began to help pioneer the concept of leasing automobiles.

In 1947, Rollins' older brother, O. Wayne Rollins, moved to Lewes from Georgia and joined him in the business in Delaware. The following year, the brothers founded Rollins Broadcasting and bought 1460 WRAD, an AM radio station based in the rural town of Radford, Virginia. As television continued to intrude on the traditional radio market, Rollins Broadcasting took advantage of falling radio station prices by increasing its holdings and launching programming targeted toward African-Americans. Rollins then developed a coordinated approach to advertising by buying billboards that allowed him to offer clients multiple advertising venues for their products. In 1956, Rollins Broadcasting expanded its business into television.

In 1961 John and Wayne Rollins took their company public. Over the next three years, annual profits from the company exceeded $9 million. In 1964, they used the proceeds of their public offering to orchestrate the $60 million leveraged buyout of the Atlanta-based Orkin Exterminating Company. Due to the constantly diversifying interests of the business, the company was renamed Rollins, Inc. By 1967, stock in the company was trading on the New York Stock Exchange.

In the 1960s John Rollins who had been visiting Jamaica purchased a seven thousand acre sugar plantation Rose Hall near Montego Bay from Francis Kerr-Jarrett. This was developed into a resort and residential development. Part of the facilities was the restoration of the ruined plantation great house as a museum.

In addition to this, John also started an automobile leasing business that would later become Rollins Truck Leasing. He also acquired Matlack Systems, the country's largest bulk trucking company, and started Rollins Purle which later became Rollins Environmental. All three companies ultimately ended up trading on the New York Stock exchange.

By 1984, the interests of Rollins, Inc. had become so diverse that the company spun off two new companies, Rollins Communications and RPC Energy Services, Inc., both of which were traded on the New York Stock Exchange.

In addition to this, Rollins founded and grew both Dover Motorsports as well as Dover Entertainment and took them public on the New York Stock Exchange.

== Political career ==
Because of his roots in the business community, Rollins became interested in Delaware's Republican Party, and worked as a fund raiser for Republicans running for local, state, and federal office in Delaware and beyond. He was elected Lieutenant Governor of Delaware in 1952, defeating Democrat Vernon B. Derrickson of Kent County and served from January 20, 1953, to January 15, 1957. In 1956, Rollins was an alternate delegate to the Republican National Convention that nominated President Dwight D. Eisenhower for reelection.

In the 1960 elections, Rollins ran for Governor of Delaware and defeated his primary opponent, incumbent Lieutenant Governor David P. Buckson. However, he was defeated in the general election by Democratic former Governor Elbert N. Carvel.

== Philanthropy ==
In addition to his leadership in business and politics, Rollins became one of the principal philanthropists in Delaware. In addition to contributing to multiple charities, he created the John W. Rollins Foundation, rated in 1999 to be one of the 50 largest charitable organizations in Delaware. He sponsored the John W. Rollins, Sr. Award for health care philanthropy, and was a benefactor of the University of Delaware, despite never having attended the school himself.

Rollins received the Order of Merit from the Knights of Malta and the Golden Plate Award of the American Academy of Achievement, and was inducted into the Delaware Sports Hall of Fame (in 2008) and the Horatio Alger Association of Distinguished Americans in 1963. The Horatio Alger Award recognized Rollins' rise from humble roots to preeminence in the world of business. His philanthropy made the Horatio Alger Association into the largest privately funded scholarship in the US for underprivileged college students. His legacy is continued by his children and his wife Michele.

== Death ==
Rollins died in his office suite at the Rollins Building in Wilmington, Delaware. There is a portrait of him hanging at the Delaware Legislative Hall in the state capitol of Dover.

Public offices
Office	Type	Location	Began office	Ended office	Notes
Lt. Governor	Executive	Dover	January 20, 1953	January 15, 1957	

Election results
Year	Office	Subject	Party	Votes	%	Opponent	Party	Votes	%
1952	Lt. Governor	John W. Rollins	Republican	86,622	51%	Vernon B. Derrickson	Democratic	83,300	49%
1960	Governor	John W. Rollins	Republican	94,043	48%	Elbert N. Carvel	Democratic	100,792	52%

== Places with more information ==
- Delaware Historical Society; website; 505 North Market Street, Wilmington, Delaware 19801; (302) 655-7161.
- University of Delaware; Library website; 181 South College Avenue, Newark, Delaware 19717; (302) 831-2965.

Party political offices
Preceded by Chester V. Townsend Jr.	Republican nominee for Lieutenant Governor of Delaware; 1952	Succeeded by David P. Buckson
Preceded by J. Caleb Boggs	Republican nominee for Governor of Delaware; 1960	Succeeded by David P. Buckson
