= Francis Moncrieff Kerr-Jarrett =

Jamaican educator (1885–1968)

Sir Francis Moncrieff Kerr-Jarrett
- Born: 27 August 1885; Trelawny Parish, Jamaica
- Died: 13 December 1968 (aged 83); Trelawny Parish, Jamaica
- Education: Bedford Modern School

Sir Francis Moncrieff Kerr-Jarrett (27 August 1885 – 13 December 1968) was a sugar manufacturer and landowner in Jamaica. He served as Custos Rotulorum of Saint James Parish, Jamaica (1933–65) and was also chairman of the Jamaica Sugar Manufacturers' Association from 1930 to 1945. He was a member of the Legislative Council of Jamaica from 1919 to 1921. Kerr-Jarrett remains the longest serving Custos of Saint James Parish, Jamaica and was integral to the development of Montego Bay as a tourist resort.

== Early life ==
Kerr-Jarrett was the son of the Hon. Herbert Jarrett Kerr, Custos of Trelawny Parish Jamaica, and Henrietta Theresa Vidal. His grandfather had also been a Custos in Jamaica. The Kerr-Jarrett family owned most of the land on which Montego Bay now stands including the 3,000 acre Barnett Estate and 18th century Great House.

The young Kerr-Jarrett was educated as a boarder at Bedford Modern School. During World War I he served as a Lieutenant with the Royal Army Service Corps.

== Career ==
Kerr-Jarrett became manager and owner of the Barnett Sugar Estates from 1910 and, after service in World War I, he was a member of the Legislative Council of Jamaica between 1919 and 1921. He served as Chairman of the Jamaica Sugar Manufacturers’ Association between 1930 and 1945, and was Custos for St James, Jamaica between 1933 and 1965. He was Chairman of Rose Hall Ltd in 1960.

Kerr-Jarrett was a JP for the parish of St James, Jamaica and was knighted in 1965 for public services to Jamaica.

== Personal life ==
Kerr-Jarret was interested in reading and public affairs. He was Life President of the Montego Bay Cricket Club, a member of the Caledonian Club in London and The Liguanea Club in Jamaica.

In 1909, Kerr-Jarrett married Adela Isabel Clerk; they had two sons, four daughters and lived at Catherine Hall in Montego Bay, Jamaica. Kerr-Jarrett died in Jamaica on 13 December 1968.
