= Orkin =

American pest control company

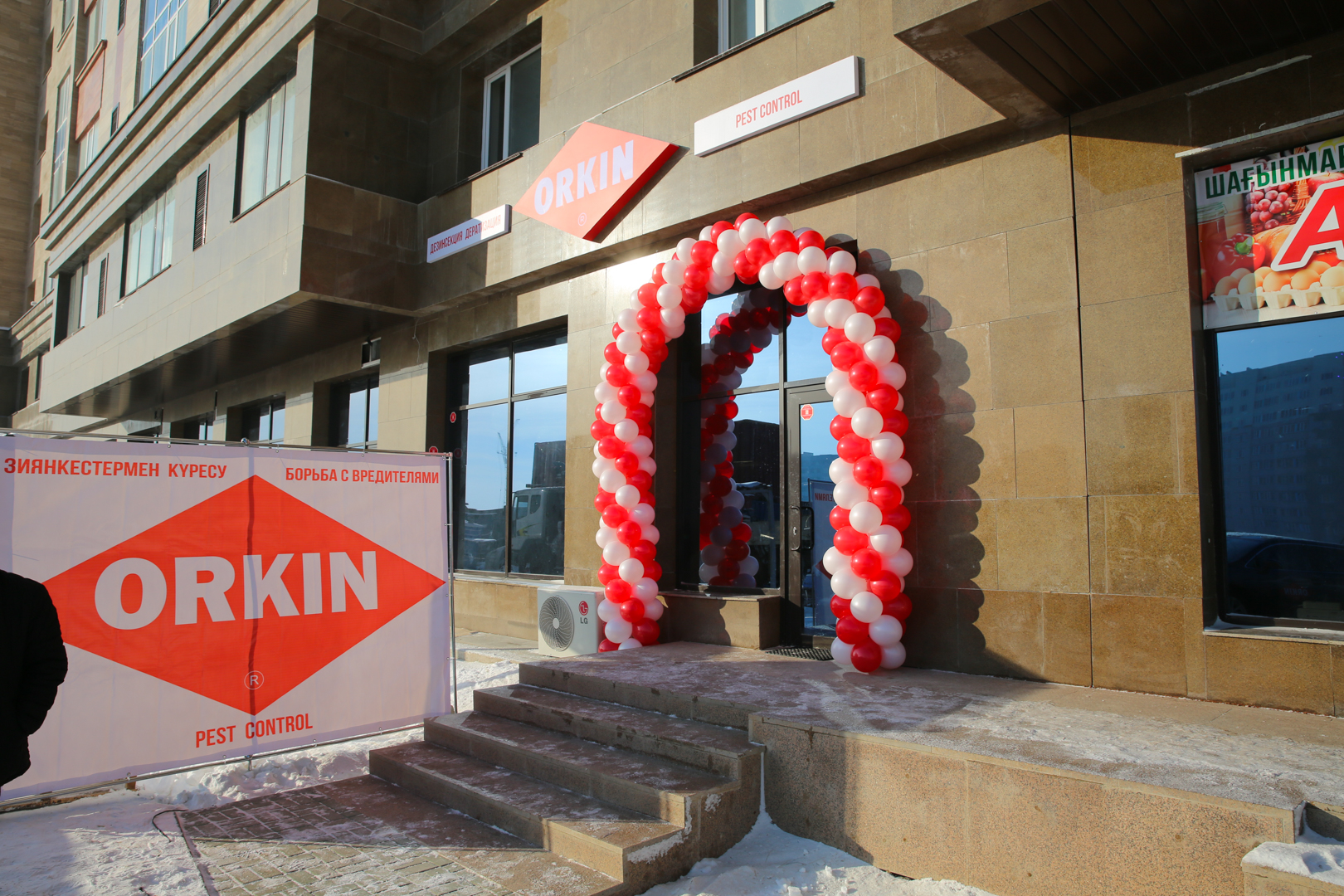
- Grand opening of Orkin office in Astana, Kazakhstan
- Type: Subsidiary of Rollins Inc.
- Industry: Pest control
- Founded: 1901; 125 years ago Walnutport, Pennsylvania, U.S.
- Founder: Otto Orkin
- Headquarters: Atlanta, Georgia, U.S.
- Number of locations: More than 400
- Key people: Gary Rollins (chairman)
- Number of employees: 8,000
- Parent: Rollins Inc.
- Website: orkin.com

Orkin is an American pest control company that was founded in 1901 by Otto Orkin. Since 1964, the company has been owned by Rollins Inc. Orkin has held research collaborations with universities around the country and with organizations like the Centers for Disease Control and Prevention (CDC) dating back to 1990 for pest biology research and pest-related disease studies.

== History ==
=== Otto the Rat Man ===
Orkin was founded in Walnutport, Pennsylvania in 1901 by Otto Orkin, who began selling rat poison door-to-door at age 14. One of six children of a Latvian immigrant family, Orkin was responsible since an early age for shooting and poisoning rats to keep them out of the family's food stores and away from their farm animals. At age 12, Orkin began experimenting with different methods to poison rats in order to discover the most effective ones. At the age of 14 Orkin borrowed 50 cents from his parents to buy arsenic in bulk, and he began consulting with apothecaries about the best proportions and mixtures to use. His initial rat poison formulas contained a combination of arsenic and phosphorus paste, mixed with fresh food scraps or red-dyed flour or sugar (so that it would not be mistaken as edible). He began offering his preparations to his neighbors for free.

Orkin carried in what would become his signature black satchel a number of measured amounts of poison in paper bags that bore the word POISON along with a drawing of a skull and crossbones. If the customer was satisfied with the effectiveness of Orkin's rat poison and wanted more to use, only then would he charge them for his service. Within six months, Orkin had several regular customers.

Orkin began expanding his business outside his hometown by taking advantage of its proximity to the Lehigh Railway, which ran from New York City to Buffalo. This allowed for easy travel to nearly anywhere in the United States. Orkin chose to travel south. His research had led him to determine that Richmond, Virginia was a city that did not have an established extermination business, and so in 1909, Orkin arrived there and started to establish not only his poison sales business in the area, but an extermination service business, as well.

Orkin found that it was much more practical and economical to perform a single "clean-out" service and then return regularly to ensure the pests could no longer secure a foothold in a building than it was to perform a full "clean-out" service once or twice a year. It was also during this time that Orkin sought to elevate the perception of his occupation by launching a public relations campaign that touted extermination services as necessary to good sanitation. Though Orkin had maintained an unofficial office in a Richmond boarding house since 1909, Orkin's business remained "officially" headquartered at a post office address in Easton, Pennsylvania until 1912, when he established an official office in downtown Richmond.

It was from here that Orkin received his first government contract in 1925 with the Army Corps of Engineers to mitigate the rat infestation of the Wilson Dam in Muscle Shoals, Alabama. On the way to Muscle Shoals, Orkin stopped in Atlanta, Georgia, a city that had no real exterminator business presence at the time. He was thus inspired to move his headquarters to the city.

=== Orkin Exterminating Company ===
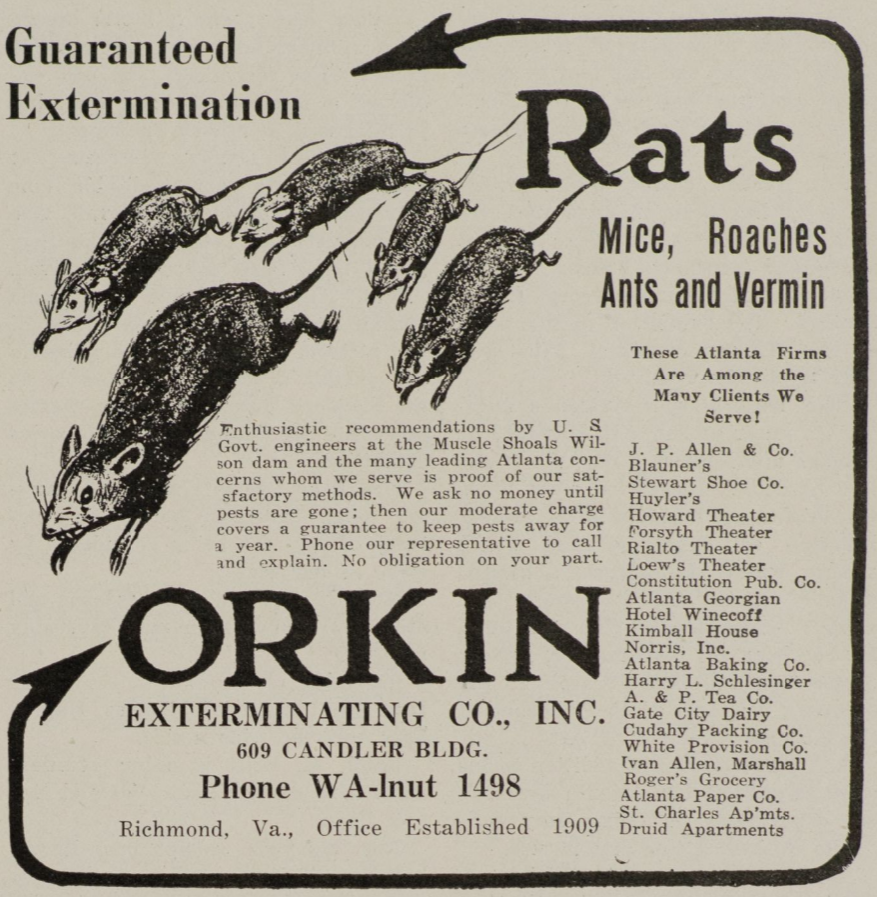
Orkin advertisement in The City Builder, April 1926

"Orkin The Rat Man" became the Orkin Exterminating Company when it moved its headquarters to Atlanta, Georgia in January 1926 (though it would maintain the brand of "Orkin The Rat Man" in Virginia until 1956). The office opened at the 609 Candler building on January 2 with Otto Orkin as president and his nephew, Theodore Oser, as vice president of sales. By April of that year, Orkin serviced over 24 major clients in the city of Atlanta, which he listed proudly in advertisements he took out in the Atlanta Chamber of Commerce's publication, The City Builder. In August 1926, the now-familiar red and white Orkin diamond logo began appearing on advertisements and official company letterheads to replace The Rat Man.

The company's offices moved to a larger space at 82 Courtland Street in 1929, and by 1930, Orkin had 13 branches in eight southern states. The branch offices were mostly run by relatives who had worked for him in the original Atlanta and Richmond offices. To start a new branch office, Otto would invest $5,000 (equivalent to $96,365 in 2025), from which a salary of $50 per week ($964 in 2025) was paid to the branch partner (and to Otto while he helped set up the branch), premises were secured, staff was hired, and purchases of a service truck, tools, supplies, and advertising were made. The balance of the funds was typically enough to keep the branch solvent while it built a customer base to become self-sufficient, but occasionally funds ran low and the branch could not afford to pay Otto his salary. In these cases, he accepted an "IOU," and collected the interest on this and his initial investment once the office began to make money and applied the money to the investment in another branch.

Orkin expanded its methods and its service offerings throughout the 1930s to include fumigation and termite removal. Beginning in 1937, Otto sought to centralize his business. Prior to this, each branch operated mostly autonomously, adhering to most of the same standards and systems, but this independence caused some confusion among consumers, many of whom believed each Orkin branch was an independently owned franchise. This consolidation helped every Orkin branch be recognized as part of a single company and centralized all national billing through the Atlanta office. These changes spurred further state-by-state growth, moving outward from the core of southern states the company was already in. By 1940, Orkin had 50 branches in 14 states, including branch offices in nearly every major southern city. Gross sales that year were around $1.5 million (equivalent to $34,471,496 in 2025).

=== World War II and postwar growth ===
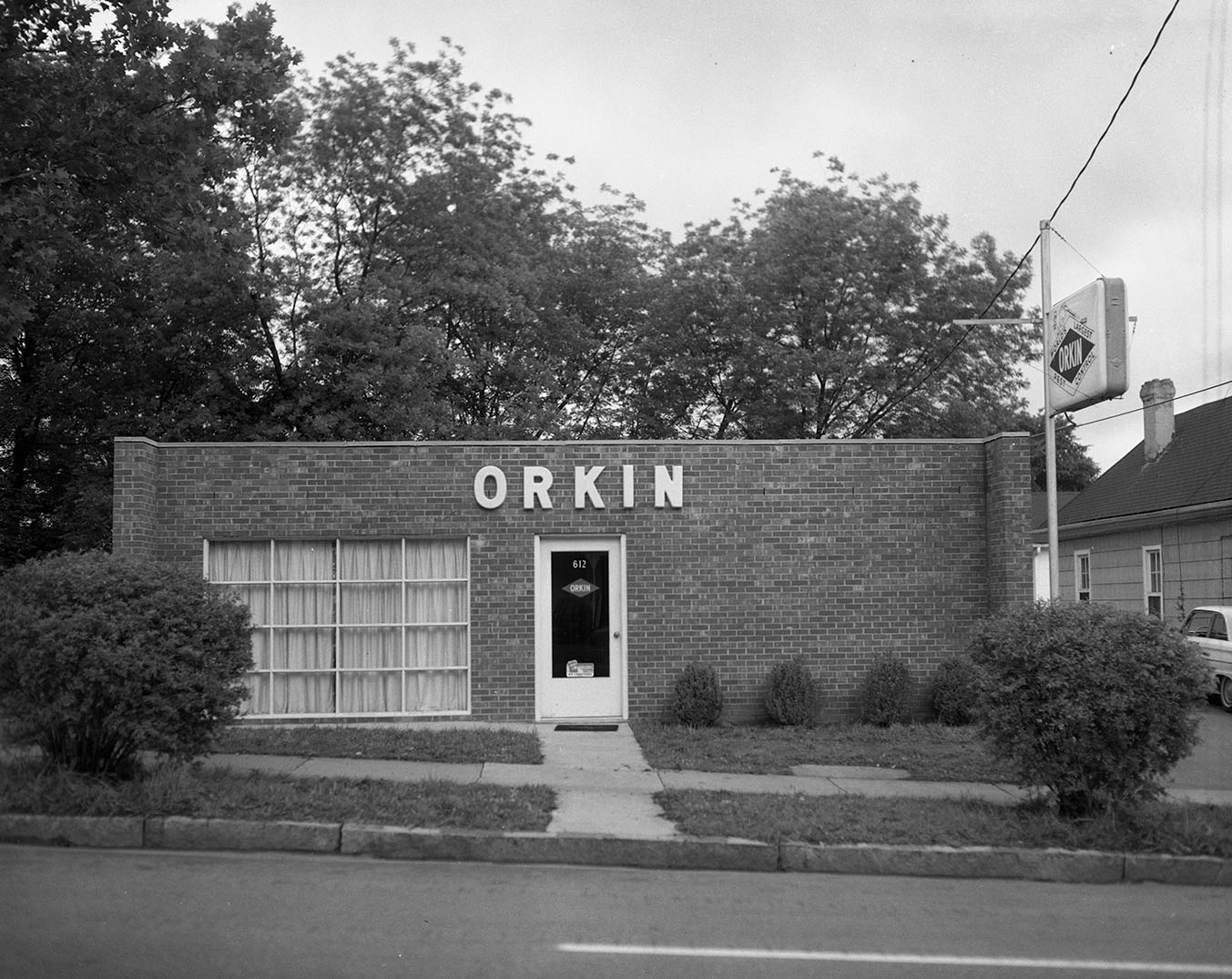
Orkin outlet in Raleigh, North Carolina, late 1950s

The United States' entry into World War II in 1941 posed challenges to Orkin in the form of shortages of personnel, chemicals and supplies. In the particular face of personnel shortages, Ted Oser worked with the National Pest Control Association founder, Bill Buettner, to meet with legislators, rationing boards, and other government agencies to convince them to classify pest control as an "essential service" during the war. Such classification would afford Orkin (and other pest control companies) draft deferments and placement on a preference list to receive chemicals and supplies such as gasoline, tires, and food ration points to manufacture rat bait. Pest control became one of only two service industries operating during the war to be declared as "essential"—the other was mortuary service. The war also caused a growth in the number of military contracts that Orkin took on—the company had over 150 military establishments under contract for regular bed bug fumigation and pest control, and many railroads maintained around-the-clock service agreements that had Orkin pest control teams sleeping in shifts on cots in the rail yards. Pest control services for homes and businesses also remained in demand on top of all of the additional wartime service that Orkin was providing. This overall increase in demand strained the company's resources, particularly since the chemicals that were most readily available for pest control were not as effective and required more frequent treatments, which taxed the already limited workforce. In order to maximize resources, many branch offices were consolidated, some accounts were serviced less often, and service providers traveled further and more often. Despite wartime shortages, however, Orkin not only survived, but it actually grew. In 1945, the company had record gross sales of $2.098 million (equivalent to $37,519,686 in 2025) and maintained 82 branches in 14 states.

Following the war, the pest control industry's introduction of new, more powerful chemicals for extermination led Orkin to hire academics and experts in the field of public health, entomology, chemistry, and sanitation. Among these hires was Herman Fellton, formerly of the U.S. Public Health Service, as Orkin's technical director. Felton centralized and standardized the purchase, use, and storage of chemicals and supplies, conducting four-day training courses and developing printed instructions for the use and handling of all chemicals. The cultural change also had effects on the literal appearance of the company—the company moved once again into new offices at 590 Courtland Street and the adjacent building at 591 Peachtree. For the first time, the executive offices were separate from the service department, with the former in the Peachtree building, and the latter in the Courtland building. In 1947, Orkin began issuing company-wide uniforms for its service technicians that followed the professional appearance that Otto had long required of his employees and bore the red diamond Orkin logo on the hats, jackets and shirts.

The introduction of new, more effective chemicals for pest control led to the expansion of Orkin's termite and fumigation services, in particular. Following the goals set by Felton, Orkin recognized the need to properly handle chemicals and was instrumental in emphasizing safety practices within the pest control industry, with Oser being named president of the NPCA in 1944 on a safety platform. Oser was also instrumental in forcing the shift in both industry and public attitudes that hiring a pest control service was not something to be ashamed of, but rather something that was a valuable service that protected the health and welfare of people and property.

By 1950, Orkin had grown to 141 branches in 20 states, with over 1,000 employees and $6 million (equivalent to $80,290,456 in 2025) in sales. The company's growth exploded throughout the 1950s and is largely attributed to Orkin's profit-sharing and incentive programs for its employees. Many branch and district managers made several times what Otto himself did each year, and many employees became millionaires through Orkin's profit-sharing. Gross revenues more than doubled to $15.6 million in 1956. The 1950s also brought a new advertising medium—television. The cartoon mascot of "Otto the Orkin Man", an anthropomorphized pesticide spray can, and his accompanying jingle became one of the most recognizable advertisements in the United States. The boom in positive public relations for the company and the public interest in the real Otto Orkin that the television advertisements generated affected everything from branding on the caps worn by service technicians and the trucks (both now bore the "Otto" character as well as the Orkin diamond) to the details of the company headquarters' relocation to 713 West Peachtree Street in 1951. Every expense of the move was publicly reported; the building was modernly appointed, and upon its opening, Orkin staged an open house for the public to tour the offices and enjoy a variety of entertainment and exhibits.

=== Company shakeups ===
The rise of Otto's sons (Sanford and William) and sons-in-law (Petty Bregman and Perry Kaye) up through the ranks of the company during the 1950s resulted in a number of changes in the company's management structure. Many of Orkin's long-term executives, including Bregman, either quit or were fired by Kaye or one of Otto's sons. Otto struggled with his sons and Kaye over control of the company. The youngest Orkin son, William, was determined that the company not have any executives outside the Orkin family, and by the mid 1950s, Otto himself had become relegated to figurehead status within the company by his sons and sons-in-law.

In the late 1950s, rumors began to circulate that questioned Otto's mental soundness in his old age. Despite the insistence of a number of employees to the press that Otto was still very much of sound mind, the rumors persisted. Further rumors in the press suggested that Kaye and Otto's sons sought to exaggerate Otto's condition in order to expedite their takeover of the company. On May 16, 1960, Kaye and Otto's sons had Otto institutionalized and declared legally incompetent. This occurred not long after Otto had transferred his controlling stake in the company to his sons and oldest daughter (Kaye's wife). Otto successfully fought to have his competency status restored, aided by his younger daughter, Gloria; her husband, Petty Bregman; and Ted Oser. At the end of 1960, Otto and Gloria both sold their remaining shares of the company for $5.35 million (equivalent to $58,224,128 in 2025) and $750,000 (equivalent to $8,162,261 in 2025), respectively.

Orkin was troubled by more than leadership changes in the period from 1958 to 1961. Pest resistance to common insecticides and growing regulations over the pest control industry resulted in a drop in annual revenues for Orkin in 1960 for the first time in the company's history. In August 1961, the three Orkin siblings who retained ownership over the company—Sanford, William, and Bernice—sold 360,000 shares, about 15 percent of the interest in the company, to the public at $24 per share (equivalent to $259 in 2025), "in order to diversify on a personal basis". Orkin's first report to its stockholders noted the company's highest profits ever and announced plans for the construction of a new home office building, to be located at 2170 Piedmont Road. Orkin set revenue and profit records again in 1963 and executives often cited the "potential" of the business. However, a true rumor had begun to circulate—Orkin was for sale. In April 1964, the company was acquired by Rollins Inc. for $62.4 million (equivalent to $647,768,240 in 2025).

=== Rollins era ===
Rollins' purchase of Orkin became known as the first leveraged buyout to be made in the United States. Under the purview of Wayne Rollins, a number of cultural and organizational changes were made to Orkin. Among the changes made were the establishment of the Orkin Acceptance Corporation, a company-owned finance company intended to streamline customer financing of service agreements; computerizing payroll, accounts, and billing; and vertical integration through the acquisition of Dettelbach Pesticide Corporation, which became the primary manufacturer and distributor of Orkin's pesticides. In 1965, Rollins acquired Arwell, Inc., a Waukegan, Illinois-based termite and pest control company for $3.14 million (equivalent to $32,079,725 in 2025). Through a gradual process of branding and name changes, Arwell eventually became known as the "Midwest Region of Orkin Exterminating Company", and the acquisition provided Orkin with entry to the commercial pest control industry.

In 1978, Gary Rollins, one of Wayne Rollins' sons, was named president of Orkin as part of a major overhaul of Rollins, Inc.'s executive structure. Gary was the first person to hold this title since Orkin had been acquired in 1964 (Earl Geiger, who had been at the helm of Orkin since the acquisition held the titles of executive vice president and division head). In 1979, one of Orkin's worst-performing branches was converted into a "development" branch to test new ideas, procedures, and techniques to see if they held promise to improve performance and revenues in the rest of the company. From 1979 to 1984, ideas forged in the development branch resulted in a number of changes made throughout the company that nearly doubled productivity. In 1984, Gary Rollins was elected president and chief operating officer of Rollins, Inc., and Ed Elkins became president of Orkin. Elkins had worked for Orkin in nearly every capacity over a 38-year career with the company and served as president until his retirement in 1987.

Following Elkins' retirement, the position of Orkin president was filled for the first time by someone from outside of the company—Bob Mercer. One of Mercer's first major initiatives as president of Orkin was the improvement of the company's employee training programs, which reduced both customer cancellations and employee turnover. He also oversaw a major reorganization of Orkin's district and branch office structure, which gave more responsibility and authority to district and branch managers. Mercer stepped down as president after only three years with the company, and Gary Rollins returned as the head of Orkin, still retaining his title of president and chief operating officer of Rollins.

During the 1990s, Orkin developed and introduced a number of new pest control techniques and products that often improved the effectiveness of treatments while reducing the amount of chemicals used. The company also launched a number of environmental awareness campaigns, which included a partnership with the National Museum of Natural History to fund exhibits such as the O. Orkin Insect Zoo. From 1997 to 2001, a number of rapid changes occurred within the company in order to improve sales, customer retention and employee training, as well as to further streamline and modernize the Orkin business model. Of the changes that this era brought, among the most significant were the opening of the Rollins Learning Center in Atlanta, improved partnerships with universities and research institutions, and adjustments to the company's quality assurance, customer service, and service guarantee practices. In 1997, Rollins sold Orkin Lawncare to TruGreen.

== Treatments and services ==
Orkin uses a method known as "A.I.M" (or assess, implement, monitor) for pest control. How the method works is:

- Finding and looking for pest problem(s)
- Solving pest problem(s) by using different technique(s)
- Monitoring effectiveness of technique(s)

== Research and education ==
Orkin has participated in research collaborations and entomology endowments with universities since 1990 to study pest behavior and biology. The research aids the company in finding new prevention and treatment methods. These universities include Auburn University, University of California Riverside, University of Florida, University of Georgia, University of Kentucky, Purdue University, University of Tennessee, and Texas A&M University.

Additionally, Orkin sponsors and conducts a number of educational programs and initiatives centered on teaching pest identification, entomology, and science basics primarily to K-6 students. The company has also sponsored a permanent exhibit at the Smithsonian to encourage a better understanding of insects and arthropods among the general public.

=== O. Orkin Insect Zoo ===
On September 9, 1993, the O. Orkin Insect Zoo (OOIZ) opened at the Smithsonian Institution's National Museum of Natural History in Washington, D.C. This permanent exhibit, made possible through a contribution from Orkin Pest Control, was created to encourage interactive learning and a better understanding of insects from all over the world as well as those found in the average backyard.

The opening of the zoo marked the first time the Smithsonian enlisted a sponsor for a permanent exhibit in any of their museums. The Smithsonian's popular insect zoo, which annually draws more than one million visitors, is the museum's only exhibit where living creatures can be seen in their natural environments. The insect zoo, located on the second floor of the museum, focuses not only on strange and beautiful insects, but also on the relationships insects have with plants, other animals and humans.

The exhibit features over 300 live insects and arthropods, including giant cockroaches, tarantulas, tailless whip scorpions and walking sticks. Each of the insects in the zoo live in their own natural habitats, which have been reproduced under the direction of entomologists and museum professionals. Included in the habitat displays are mangrove swamps, a living bee tree, a desert diorama and a tropical rainforest.

In addition, there are hands-on activities that encourage the OOIZ visitor—adult or child—to get better acquainted with insects and arthropods of all shapes and sizes. Of particular interest in the OOIZ is the "Our House, Their House" display which shows insects living in and around a giant 3-D home. By pushing buttons in front of the house, visitors illuminate the harborage areas for common household insects such as fleas, roaches, carpenter ants and silverfish.

=== Junior Pest Investigators ===
Orkin's Junior Pest Investigators’ program offers free science lesson plans for teachers. These lessons, for students in grades K-6, focus on common pest identification and environmentally friendly ways to help control pests. The lesson plans are based on the National Science Education Standards and provide resources for assessment such as grading rubrics and quizzes.

=== Orkin Man school presentations ===
The Orkin Man School Presentation program, started in the 1950s, is a learning initiative that allows Orkin employees to educate students in their communities on the roles that insects play in the world and how they affect the environment.

== Training ==
=== Training program ===
Rollins University is a strategic training program that increases its employees’ pest management knowledge. New technicians participate in eight weeks of field and virtual training. Training Magazine has recognized Orkin's training program on its Top 125 list several times since 2002.

=== Training center ===
Located in Atlanta, the 28,000-square-foot (2,600 m^{2}) training facility includes simulated customer environments, including a house and mock grocery store. The facility also has a commercial kitchen, hospital room, hotel room and warehouse.

== Brand ==
=== The Orkin Man ===
The Orkin Man icon originated from the “Otto the Orkin Man” advertisement, a spray-can cartoon man, in the 1950s. Since then, the Orkin Man has been depicted as the pest control expert (Big Number One campaign), technologically savvy (Exterminator Robot campaign) and scientifically trained to control pests (Pest Control Down to a Science campaign).

The most recognized Orkin uniform consists of a white collared shirt with the Orkin logo and red epaulets and pressed khaki (or gray) pants. The uniform varies depending on an employee's job function for safety purposes. Commercial technicians have an additional pocket to store a handheld device used to record service data for on-the-job use.

=== The Orkin Truck ===
Orkin's fleet consists principally of white Ford Ranger and Chevrolet Colorado trucks. Outfitted with Orkin's red diamond logo, each truck has a Geotab global positioning system (GPS) vehicle tracking device to help improve routing efficiency so field specialists can increase their time with customers and decrease driving time. Ford ended production of the Ranger in St. Paul, Minnesota on Dec. 16, 2011. Orkin received the last truck off the production line for its service rotation.

Rollins announced in September 2012 that the Toyota Tacoma will replace Orkin's fleet of Ford Rangers. Orkin will lease the Tacomas and sell the Rangers as those leases expire. The company plans to replace all Ford Rangers by 2015.

=== Franchises ===
Orkin has more than 400 owned and operated branch offices and 58 franchises in the U.S. The company has international franchises and subsidiaries in Canada, Europe, Central America, the Caribbean, the Middle East, Asia, the Mediterranean, Africa and Mexico. Orkin recently moved into the Australia market with the acquisition of Murray Pest Control, AllPest, Statewide Pest Control and Scientific Pest and Vegetation Management.

=== Employees ===
Orkin's employees have received industry recognition for their service. In 2012, Rick Gaudreault of Collinsville, Ill. was chosen as the “Termite Technician of the Year” by Pest Control Technology magazine. In 2011, Jim Bailey of Columbus, Ohio was honored by Pest Control Technology magazine as the 2010 Commercial Technician of the Year. In 2010, Randy Miller of Greenville, S.C. was chosen by the magazine as the 2009 Residential Technician of the Year.

=== The Orkin Pro ===
In April 2022, the company changed the direction to move away from the "Orkin Man", instead going with a more gender neutral approach with the "Orkin Pro". To launch this new direction, the company created an ad campaign that featured notable sports, television, and social media celebrities.

== Partnerships and sponsorships ==
=== Nothing But Nets ===
Orkin created the “Fight The Bite” campaign in 2008 to help raise money for the purchase and distribution of bed nets in Africa, where 90 percent of malaria-related deaths occur among children. From 2008 to 2011, Orkin donated one mosquito net to Nothing But Nets a campaign started by the United Nations Foundation, with the purchase of every mosquito service. Nothing But Nets provides insecticide-treated bed nets to prevent deaths by malaria in Africa. Orkin's "Fight The Bite" campaign, which also includes donations, raised more than $820,000 in four years.

=== Centers for Disease Control and Prevention (CDC) ===
Orkin has partnered with the Centers for Disease Control and Prevention (CDC), on public education initiatives involving pest-related health risks since 2004. The CDC shares their scientific knowledge on pest-related diseases with Orkin employees during bi-annual training sessions. In April and September 2010, Orkin hosted CDC-led training seminars to discuss triatomine bugs (insects that transmit Chagas disease) and insect resistance to pesticides. Orkin's April 2011 training session featured CDC behavioral specialist Dr. Emily Zielinski-Gutierrez, who discussed emerging mosquito-borne and tick-borne diseases in the U.S. and provided prevention measures for technicians to share with homeowners. During the October 2011 seminar, an expert shared rabies transmission facts and prevention tips. The seminars are broadcast via satellite to Orkin branches throughout the country. Field representatives from Orkin's 400 locations view the live broadcasts or access them later through a video-on-demand feature.

=== National Pest Management Association ===
Orkin serves as the presenting sponsor of the National Pest Management Association’s Women of Excellence Award. The award recognizes one woman each year who displays outstanding leadership skills and significantly contributes to advancing the pest management industry.

=== Houston Zoo ===
Orkin is an official corporate sponsor of the Houston Zoo, supporting annual programs and community outreach initiatives. Orkin also sponsored the Houston Zoo’s Earth Day celebration in April 2012. Orkin partnered with the Houston Zoo to sponsor the DINOSAURS! exhibit, which opened May 4, 2012. Orkin sponsored “Pollinator Palooza” at the Houston Zoo in June 2012 to highlight the role of Earth's pollinators.

== Controversies ==
Orkin has been the target of various lawsuits across the country for alleged poor service and sloppy methods. Notably, Orkin was investigated for racketeering in Florida for its termite contracting tactics in 2004, with one source reporting over 15,000 consumer complaints in the state over a four-year period. This inquiry comes on top of multiple complaints filed throughout the state alleging fraud and poor performance, as well as similar claims filed across the country.

In 2001, NY Attorney General Spitzer instituted measures to reform Orkin advertising and arbitration for its termite services.

== Works cited ==
- 100 Stories of Business Success: Case Histories of American Enterprise. Simon and Schuster. 1952.
- Kirk, Margaret O. (2005). The Making of the World's Best Pest Control Company. Atlanta, GA: Rollins, Inc. ISBN 0-9764862-0-2.
