= Barn (disambiguation) =

A barn is a farm building for livestock and hay storage.

Barn may also refer to:

== Places ==
- Bärn, German name of the town Moravský Beroun, Czech Republic
- Barn, West Virginia, a community in the United States
- Barn, Phagwara, a village in Punjab, India

== Arts and entertainment ==
- Barn, a 2021 album by Neil Young and "Crazy Horse"
- Barn Records, record label

== Other uses ==
- Barn church, specific type of clandestine church
- Barn (Welsh magazine), a current affairs magazine from Wales
- Barn (unit), a unit of cross section area used in nuclear and particle physics
- Barn United F.C., a football club in Northern Ireland, United Kingdom
- SVT Barn, a Swedish children's television channel

== See also ==
- Barnes (disambiguation)
- Broadband 4 Rural North (B4RN), pronounced "barn", a project in England
- Barn theatre (disambiguation)
- The Barn (disambiguation)
- Barn fire
- Barn house
