= E. H. Hedrick =

American politician (1894–1954)

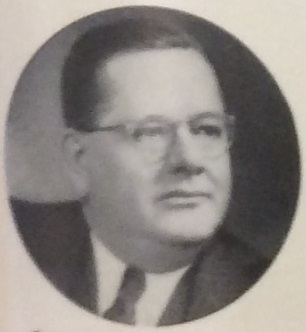

Member of the U.S. House of Representatives from West Virginia's 6th district
- In office January 3, 1945 – January 3, 1953
- Preceded by: Joe L. Smith
- Succeeded by: Robert C. Byrd

Personal details
- Born: August 9, 1894 Barn, West Virginia
- Died: September 20, 1954 (aged 60) Beckley, West Virginia
- Party: Democratic

Erland Harold Hedrick, better known as E. H. Hedrick (August 9, 1894 – September 20, 1954) was an American Democratic politician from West Virginia.

Born in Barn in Mercer County, West Virginia, he was graduated from the medical school of the University of Maryland, Baltimore in 1917. During World War I he served in the United States Army Medical Corps as a first lieutenant (1917–1919). After the war he returned to Beckley where he started his own medical practice (1919–1944).

Hedrick also served as a medical examiner for the Veteran Administration from 1919 to 1944, city and country health officer (1927–1932) and superintendent of Pinecrest Tuberculosis Sanitarium in Beckley (1943–1944).

His political career began when he was elected to the United States House of Representatives in 1944 from the now extinct 6th district. He served four consecutive two-year terms from January 3, 1945 to January 3, 1953.

Hedrick did not run for a fifth term in 1952, but instead sought the Democratic nomination for governor. However, he lost to William C. Marland, State Attorney General, who went on to win the general election. A fellow Democrat, State Senator Robert Byrd, who eventually became Dean and President pro tem of the United States Senate and a Senate Majority Leader, replaced him as congressman from the 6th district.

After his defeat for the gubernatorial nomination, Hedrick left politics and resumed his business and professional interests. He died in Beckley and is buried in Sunset Memorial Park.

U.S. House of Representatives
Preceded by Joe L. Smith	Member of the U.S. House of Representatives from West Virginia's 6th congressional district 1945–1953	Succeeded by Robert C. Byrd
