= The Barn =

The Barn may refer to:

- The Barn (comic strip), comic created by Canadian cartoonist Ralph Hagen and syndicated by Creators Syndicate
- The Barn (film), a 2016 horror film
- The Barn (recording studio), the former Alan Irish Barn, an art and music studio in Vermont, United States
- "The Barn", the nickname of the fictitious Farmington Police Station in the television series The Shield
- The Barn Church, first barn church to be consecrated in England

== Sports venues ==
- Auburn Sports Arena, or "The Barn", in Auburn, Alabama, US
- The Barn (Xavier University of Louisiana), at Xavier University of Louisiana
- Community Choice Credit Union Convention Center, or "The Barn", historically known as Veterans Memorial Auditorium, in Des Moines, Iowa, US
- St. Louis Arena, or "The Barn", formerly known as the Checkerdome, in St. Louis, Missouri, US
- Williams Arena, or "The Barn", at the University of Minnesota, Twin Cities, US
- Windsor Arena, or "The Barn", in Windsor, Ontario, Canada

== Other uses ==
- The Barn (Los Angeles), a house built by A. Quincy Jones

== See also ==
- Barn (disambiguation)
