= Robert C. Byrd Honors Scholarship Program =

The Robert C. Byrd Honors Scholarship Program was a federally funded and state-administered merit-based scholarship program in the United States.

== Program history ==
It was designed to recognize exceptionally able high school seniors who showed promise of continued excellence in postsecondary education. The United States Department of Education's Office of Postsecondary Education awarded funds to state education agencies, which awarded scholarships (also known as Byrd Honors Scholarships) to eligible applicants. Students received scholarship funds which were to go towards college expenses.

=== Funding ===
The Byrd Honors Scholarships were established in 1985, providing $1,500 nonrenewable scholarships to eligible students. In 1993, the program was expanded to allow students who successfully completed their first year of college to reapply for stipends for the following three years. This brought the scholarship to its final value of $6,000 over four years. To pay for the over 27,000 scholars supported by the program, appropriations for the program were nearly $40,000,000 annually.

Funding for the scholarship was eliminated for the 2011–2012 school year. No new awards were given that year, and payments for returning students were not distributed.

== Application requirements ==
Each state set the criteria for awarding the scholarships in addition to federal requirements. All applicants were to be high school graduates who:

- had been accepted for enrollment at institutions of higher education in the United States;
- had demonstrated outstanding academic achievement;
- and who showed promise of continued academic excellence.
