= Robert Byrd =

American politician (1917–2010)

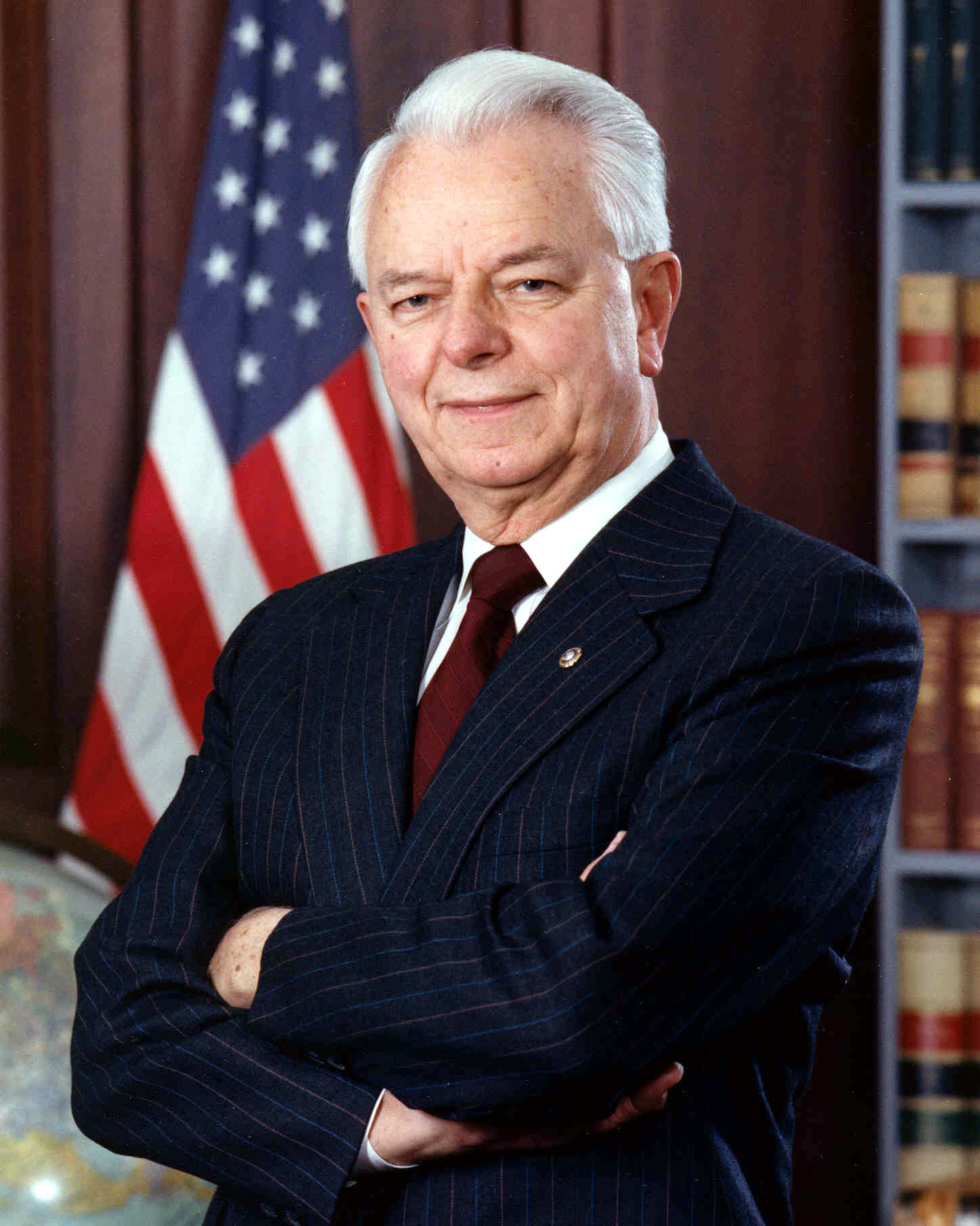
- Official portrait, c. 2000

President pro tempore of the United States Senate
- In office January 3, 2007 – June 28, 2010
- Preceded by: Ted Stevens
- Succeeded by: Daniel Inouye
- In office June 6, 2001 – January 3, 2003
- Preceded by: Strom Thurmond
- Succeeded by: Ted Stevens
- In office January 3, 2001 – January 20, 2001
- Preceded by: Strom Thurmond
- Succeeded by: Strom Thurmond
- In office January 3, 1989 – January 3, 1995
- Preceded by: John C. Stennis
- Succeeded by: Strom Thurmond

United States Senator from West Virginia
- In office January 3, 1959 – June 28, 2010
- Preceded by: Chapman Revercomb
- Succeeded by: Carte Goodwin
Senate positions
President pro tempore emeritus of the United States Senate
In office January 3, 2003 – January 3, 2007
Preceded by	Strom Thurmond
Succeeded by	Ted Stevens
42nd Dean of the United States Senate
In office January 3, 2003 – June 28, 2010
Preceded by	Strom Thurmond
Succeeded by	Daniel Inouye
Chair of the Senate Appropriations Committee
In office June 6, 2001 – January 3, 2003
Preceded by	Ted Stevens
Succeeded by	Ted Stevens
In office January 3, 2001 – January 20, 2001
Preceded by	Ted Stevens
Succeeded by	Ted Stevens
In office January 3, 1989 – January 3, 1995
Preceded by	John Stennis
Succeeded by	Mark Hatfield
Senate Majority Leader
In office January 3, 1987 – January 3, 1989
Whip	Alan Cranston
Preceded by	Bob Dole
Succeeded by	George Mitchell
In office January 3, 1977 – January 3, 1981
Whip	Alan Cranston
Preceded by	Mike Mansfield
Succeeded by	Howard Baker
Senate Minority Leader
In office January 3, 1981 – January 3, 1987
Whip	Alan Cranston
Preceded by	Howard Baker
Succeeded by	Bob Dole
Chair of the Senate Democratic Caucus
In office January 3, 1977 – January 3, 1989
Preceded by	Mike Mansfield
Succeeded by	George Mitchell
Senate Majority Whip
In office January 3, 1971 – January 3, 1977
Leader	Mike Mansfield
Preceded by	Ted Kennedy
Succeeded by	Alan Cranston

Member of the U.S. House of Representatives from West Virginia's 6th district
- In office January 3, 1953 – January 3, 1959
- Preceded by: Erland Hedrick
- Succeeded by: John Slack

Member of the West Virginia Senate from the 9th district
- In office December 1, 1950 – December 23, 1952
- Preceded by: Eugene Scott
- Succeeded by: Jack Nuckols

Member of the West Virginia House of Delegates from Raleigh County
- In office January 1947 – December 1950
- Preceded by: Multi-member district
- Succeeded by: Multi-member district

Personal details
- Born: Cornelius Calvin Sale Jr. November 20, 1917 North Wilkesboro, North Carolina, U.S.
- Died: June 28, 2010 (aged 92) Fairfax County, Virginia, U.S.
- Resting place: Columbia Gardens Cemetery
- Party: Democratic
- Spouse: Erma James (m. 1936; died 2006)
- Children: 2
- Education: Marshall University (BA); American University (JD)
- Byrd's voice Byrd discussing early Senate history during a special bicentennial session Recorded April 6, 1989

Robert Carlyle Byrd (born Cornelius Calvin Sale Jr.; November 20, 1917 – June 28, 2010) was an American politician who represented West Virginia in the United States Senate from 1959 until his death in 2010. A member of the Democratic Party, he served as a U.S. Representative from West Virginia's 6th congressional district from 1953 to 1959. Byrd is the longest serving senator in American history, the second longest serving member of Congress, and the only West Virginian to serve in both houses of the West Virginia Legislature and the U.S. Congress.

Raised in southern West Virginia, Byrd's political career spanned more than sixty years. He first entered the political arena by organizing and leading a local chapter of the Ku Klux Klan in the 1940s, an action he later described as "the greatest mistake I ever made". In the time he earned Bachelor of Arts degree at the Marshall University and a Juris Doctor degree at the American University, Byrd served in the West Virginia House of Delegates from 1947 to 1950, and the West Virginia State Senate from 1950 to 1952. He was elected to the United States House of Representatives in 1952, where he served there for six years before being elected to the Senate in 1958. He was re-elected in 1964 and re-elected seven more times.

In the Senate, Byrd rose to become one of the chamber's most powerful members, serving as secretary of the Senate Democratic Caucus from 1967 to 1971 and—after defeating his longtime colleague Ted Kennedy for the job—as Senate Majority Whip from 1971 to 1977. Over the next 12 years, Byrd led the Democratic caucus as Senate Majority Leader and Senate Minority Leader. In 1989, he stepped down, following the pressure to make way for new party leadership. As the longest-serving Democratic senator, Byrd held the position of President pro tempore four times when his party was in the majority. This placed him third in the line of presidential succession, after the vice president and the Speaker of the House of Representatives. Byrd became West Virginia’s Senior Senator in 1985 following the retirement of Jennings Randolph. He served three different tenures as chairman of the United States Senate Committee on Appropriations, which enabled Byrd to steer a great deal of federal money toward projects in West Virginia.

Critics derided his efforts as pork barrel spending, while Byrd argued that the many federal projects he worked to bring to West Virginia represented progress for the people of his state. Notably, Byrd strongly opposed Clinton's 1993 efforts to allow homosexuals to serve in the military and supported efforts to limit same-sex marriage. Although he filibustered against the 1964 Civil Rights Act and supported the Vietnam War earlier in his career, Byrd's views changed considerably over the course of his life; by the early 2000s, he had completely renounced racism and segregation. Byrd was outspoken in his opposition to the Iraq War. Renowned for his knowledge of Senate precedent and parliamentary procedure, Byrd wrote a four-volume history of the Senate in later life. Near the end of his life, Byrd was in declining health and was hospitalized several times. He died in office on June 28, 2010, at the age of 92, and was buried at Columbia Gardens Cemetery in Arlington County, Virginia.

== Background ==
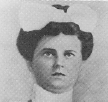
Byrd's mother, Ada Mae Kirby

Robert Byrd was born on November 20, 1917, as Cornelius Calvin Sale Jr. in North Wilkesboro, North Carolina, to Cornelius Calvin Sale and his wife Ada Mae (Kirby). When he was eleven months old, his mother died on Armistice Day during the 1918 flu pandemic. Byrd was the youngest of four and in accordance with his mother's wishes, his father dispersed the children among relatives. Calvin Jr. was adopted by his biological father's sister and her husband, Vlurma and Titus Byrd, who changed his name to Robert Carlyle Byrd and raised him in the coal mining region of southern West Virginia, primarily in the coal town of Stotesbury, West Virginia. Robert Byrd's biological father Calvin Sale went on to have four more children with his second wife, Ola (Pruitt) Sale.

Byrd was educated in the public schools of Stotesbury. Byrd played the violin at the Mark Twain School orchestra and the bass drum in the Mark Twain High School marching band. He was the valedictorian of his 1934 graduating class at Stotesbury's Mark Twain High School.

=== Marriage and children ===
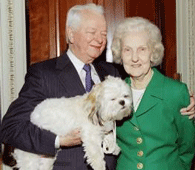
Senator Byrd, his wife, Erma, and dog, Trouble

On May 29, 1937, Byrd married Erma Ora James (June 12, 1917 – March 25, 2006) who was born to a coal mining family in Floyd County, Virginia. Her family moved to Raleigh County, West Virginia, where she met Byrd when they attended the same high school.

Robert Byrd had two daughters (Mona Byrd Fatemi and Marjorie Byrd Moore), six grandchildren, and seven great-grandchildren.

=== Ku Klux Klan ===
In the early 1940s, Byrd recruited 150 of his friends and associates to create a new chapter of the Ku Klux Klan in Sophia, West Virginia.

As a young boy, Byrd had witnessed his adoptive father walk in a Klan parade in Matoaka, West Virginia. While growing up, Byrd had heard that "the Klan defended the American way of life against racemixers and Communists". He then wrote to Joel L. Baskin, Grand Dragon of the Realm of Virginia, West Virginia, Maryland, and Delaware, who responded that he would come and organize a chapter when Byrd had recruited 150 people.

It was Baskin who told Byrd, "You have a talent for leadership, Bob … The country needs young men like you in the leadership of the nation". Byrd later recalled, "Suddenly lights flashed in my mind! Someone important had recognized my abilities! I was only 23 or 24 years old, and the thought of a political career had never really hit me. But strike me that night, it did." Byrd became a Kleagle (recruiter) and leader of his chapter. When it came time to elect the exalted cyclops (highest-ranking officer) in the local Klan unit, Byrd won unanimously. Despite his later claim to have only been a KKK member for a year, documents indicate that Byrd joined the KKK around 1941, and a 1946 letter to Samuel Green indicates that Byrd was a Klan member until at least 1946.

In December 1944, Byrd wrote to segregationist Mississippi Senator Theodore G. Bilbo:

I shall never fight in the armed forces with a negro by my side ... Rather I should die a thousand times, and see Old Glory trampled in the dirt never to rise again than to see this beloved land of ours become degraded by race mongrels, a throwback to the blackest specimen from the wilds.

— Robert C. Byrd, in a letter to Sen. Theodore Bilbo (D-MS), 1944

In 1946, Byrd wrote a letter to Samuel Green, the Ku Klux Klan's Grand Wizard, stating, "The Klan is needed today as never before, and I am anxious to see its rebirth here in West Virginia and in every state in the nation". The same year, he was encouraged to run for the West Virginia House of Delegates by the Klan's grand dragon; Byrd won, and took his seat in January 1947. However, during his campaign for the United States House of Representatives in 1952, he announced that, "after about a year, I became disinterested, quit paying my dues, and dropped my membership in the organization", and that during the nine years that have followed, he had never been interested in the Klan. He said he had joined the Klan because he felt it offered excitement and was anti-communist, but also suggested his participation there "reflected the fears and prejudices" of the time.

Byrd later called joining the KKK "the greatest mistake I ever made". In 1997, he told an interviewer he would encourage young people to become involved in politics but also warned, "Be sure you avoid the Ku Klux Klan. Don't get that albatross around your neck. Once you've made that mistake, you inhibit your operations in the political arena." In his last autobiography, Byrd explained that he was a KKK member because he "was sorely afflicted with tunnel vision— a jejune and immature outlook—seeing only what I wanted to see because I thought the Klan could provide an outlet for my talents and ambitions". Byrd also said in 2005, "I know now I was wrong. Intolerance had no place in America. I apologized a thousand times … and I don't mind apologizing over and over again. I can't erase what happened". In a 2005 book, Byrd claimed that the Klan had been made of "upstanding people" like lawyers, judges, clergy and doctors.

== Early career ==
Byrd worked as a gas station attendant, grocery store clerk, and butcher. During World War II, he worked as a welder in shipyards in Baltimore and Tampa. After returning to West Virginia, he bought a grocery store in Sophia. In 1946, he won a seat in the West Virginia House of Delegates, representing Raleigh County from 1947 to 1950. Byrd became a local celebrity after a radio station in Beckley began broadcasting his "fiery fundamentalist lessons". In 1950, he was elected to the West Virginia Senate, where he served from December 1950 to December 1952.

In 1951, Byrd was among the official witnesses of the execution of Harry Burdette and Fred Painter, which was the first use of the electric chair in West Virginia. In 1965 the state abolished capital punishment, with the last execution having occurred in 1959.

=== Continued education ===
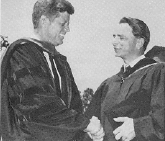
Byrd and President John F. Kennedy at his 1963 American University commencement ceremony

Early in his career Byrd attended Beckley College, Concord College, Morris Harvey College, Marshall College, and George Washington University Law School, all without receiving a degree. Byrd also joined the Tau Kappa Epsilon fraternity. Byrd later decided to complete his Bachelor of Arts degree in political science, and in 1994 he graduated summa cum laude from Marshall University.

Byrd began night classes at American University Washington College of Law in 1953, while a member of the United States House of Representatives. When Byrd attended law school, he did not have an undergraduate degree; many law schools at the time did not require undergraduate degrees for admission. American University itself normally required bachelor's degrees for admission to its law school, but, because Byrd had taken some courses in both undergraduate and law schools at other institutions, the Dean of American agreed to allow Byrd to attend as long as he maintanied at least a B average. While in law school, Byrd won the Mooers trophy as outstanding student in trial practice court, and received awards for the best examinations in Corporation Law, Security Transactions, and Administrative Law. He also served as legislation editor of the American University Law Review. He earned his Juris Doctor degree cum laude in 1963, by which time he was a U.S. Senator. President John F. Kennedy spoke at the commencement ceremony on June 10, 1963, and presented the graduates their diplomas, including Byrd. According to the Historian of the United States Senate and the Congressional Research Service, Byrd is the only sitting member of Congress to have begun and completed law school while serving. Although Byrd graduated from law school, he was never admitted to the bar and never became a lawyer. (Note: In 1971, in response to a journalist's question, Byrd stated that he had never taken a bar examination. Both the District of Columbia Bar and the West Virginia Bar list deceased bar members in their membership directory; however, neither bar lists Byrd as a member.)

== Congressional service ==
In 1952, Byrd was elected to the United States House of Representatives for West Virginia's 6th congressional district, succeeding E. H. Hedrick, who retired from the House to make an unsuccessful run for the Democratic nomination for governor. Byrd was re-elected twice from this district, anchored in Charleston and also including his home in Sophia, serving from January 3, 1953, to January 3, 1959. Byrd defeated Republican incumbent W. Chapman Revercomb for the United States Senate in 1958. Revercomb's record supporting civil rights had become an issue, playing in Byrd's favor. Byrd was re-elected to the Senate eight times. He was West Virginia's junior senator for his first four terms; his colleague from 1959 to 1985 was Jennings Randolph, who had been elected on the same day as Byrd's first election in a special election to fill the seat of the late Senator Matthew Neely.

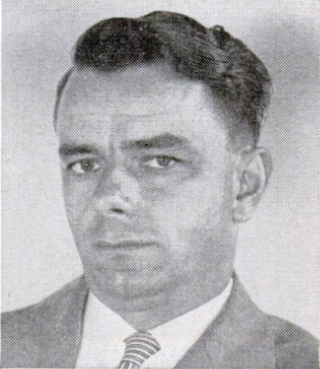
Byrd official portrait as a congressman

Despite his tremendous popularity in the state, Byrd ran unopposed only once, in 1976. On three other occasions—in 1970, 1994 and 2000—he won all 55 of West Virginia's counties. In his re-election bid in 2000, he won all but seven precincts. Congresswoman Shelley Moore Capito, the daughter of one of Byrd's longtime foes, former governor Arch Moore Jr., briefly considered a challenge to Byrd in 2006 but decided against it. Capito's district covered much of the territory Byrd had represented in the U.S. House.

In the 1960 Democratic Party presidential primaries, Byrd—a close Senate ally of Lyndon B. Johnson—endorsed and campaigned for Hubert Humphrey over front-runner John F. Kennedy in the state's crucial primary. However, Kennedy won the state's primary and eventually the general election.

=== Public service records ===
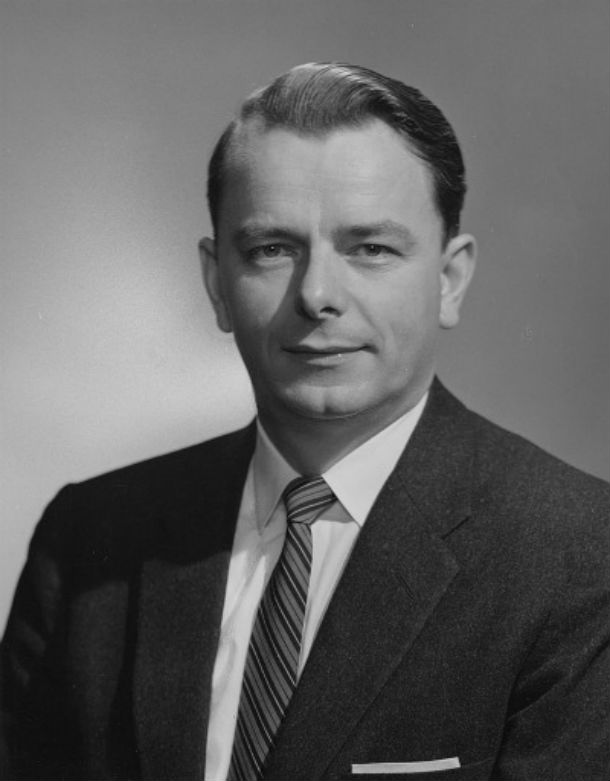
Byrd early in his Senate career

Byrd was elected to a record ninth consecutive full Senate term in the November 7, 2006, midterm elections. He became the longest-serving senator in American history on June 12, 2006, surpassing Strom Thurmond of South Carolina with 17,327 days of service. On November 18, 2009, Byrd became the longest-serving member in congressional history, with 56 years, 320 days of combined service in the House and Senate, passing Carl Hayden of Arizona. Previously, Byrd had held the record for the longest unbroken tenure in the Senate (Thurmond resigned during his first term and was re-elected seven months later). He is the only senator ever to serve more than 50 years. Including his tenure as a state legislator from 1947 to 1953, Byrd's service on the political front exceeded 60 continuous years. Byrd, who never lost an election, cast his 18,000th vote on June 21, 2007, the most of any senator in history. John Dingell broke Byrd's record as longest-serving member of Congress on June 7, 2013.

Upon the death of former Florida Senator George Smathers on January 20, 2007, Byrd became the last living United States senator from the 1950s.

Having taken part in the admission of Alaska and Hawaii to the union, Byrd was the last surviving senator to have voted on a bill granting statehood to a U.S. territory. At the time of Byrd's death, 14 sitting or former members of the Senate had not been born when Byrd's tenure in the Senate began, as well as then-President Barack Obama.

=== Committee assignments ===
These are the committee assignments for Sen. Byrd's 9th and final term.

- Committee on Appropriations
  - Subcommittee on Defense
  - Subcommittee on Energy and Water Development
  - Subcommittee on Homeland Security (Chair)
  - Subcommittee on Interior, Environment, and Related Agencies
  - Subcommittee on Military Construction and Veterans Affairs
  - Subcommittee on Transportation, Housing and Urban Development, and Related Agencies
- Committee on Armed Services
  - Subcommittee on Emerging Threats and Capabilities
  - Subcommittee on Readiness and Management Support
  - Subcommittee on Strategic Forces
- Committee on the Budget
- Committee on Rules and Administration

=== Filibuster of the Civil Rights Act of 1964 ===
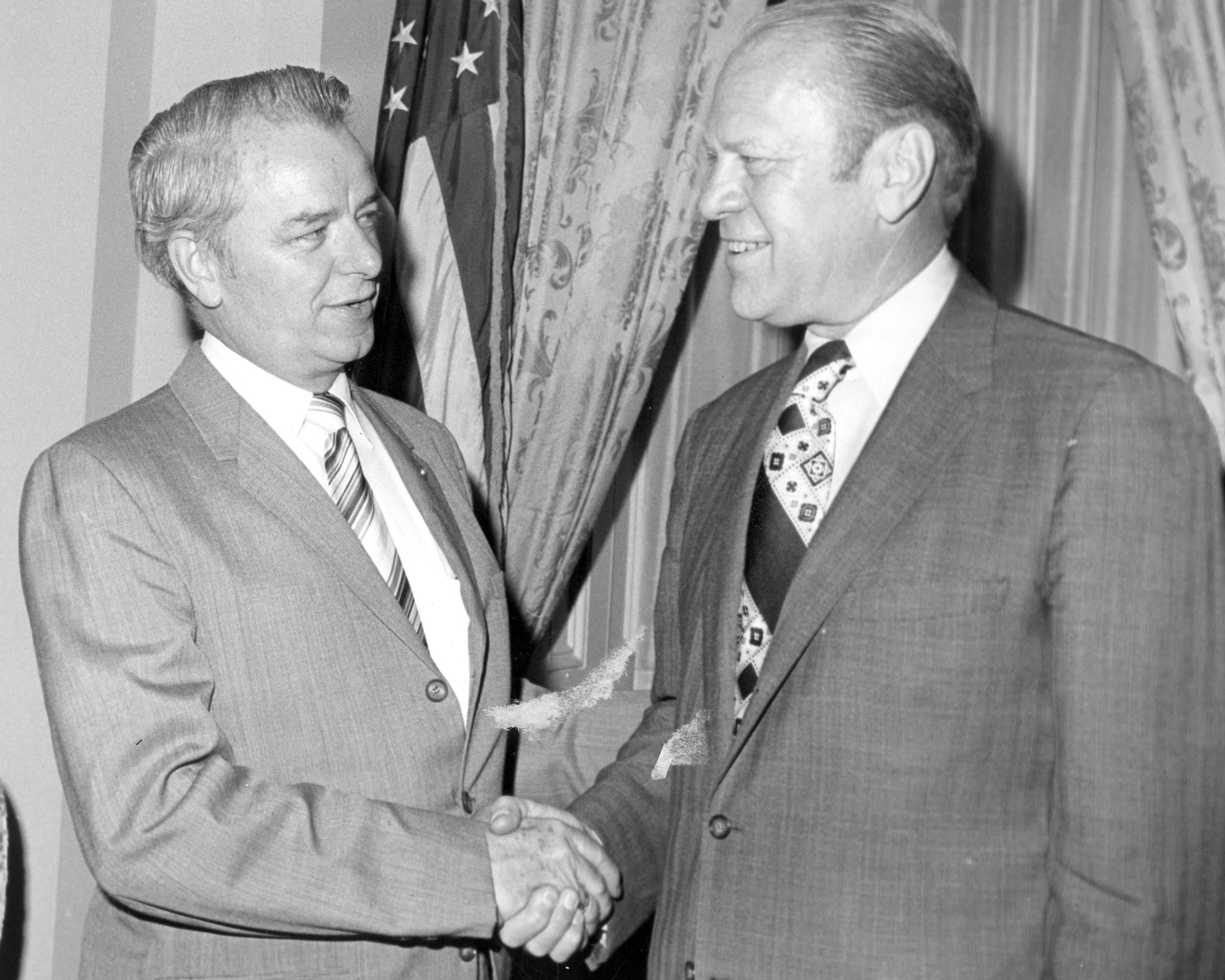
Senate Majority Whip Byrd meeting with President Gerald Ford

Byrd was a member of the wing of the Democratic Party that opposed federally-mandated desegregation and civil rights. However, despite his early career in the KKK, Byrd was linked to such senators as John C. Stennis, J. William Fulbright and George Smathers, who based their segregationist positions on their view of states' rights in contrast to senators like James Eastland, who held a reputation as a committed racist.

Byrd joined with Southern Democratic senators to filibuster the Civil Rights Act of 1964, personally filibustering the bill for 14 hours, a move he later said he regretted. Despite an 83-day filibuster in the Senate, both parties in Congress voted overwhelmingly in favor of the Act (Democrats 47–16, Republicans 30–2) with Byrd voting against, and President Johnson would later sign the bill into law. He did not sign the 1956 Southern Manifesto, and voted in favor of the Civil Rights Acts of 1960 and the 24th Amendment to the U.S. Constitution. Byrd voted in favor of the initial House resolution for the Civil Rights Act of 1957 on June 18, 1957, but voted against the Senate amendment to the bill on August 27, 1957. Byrd voted against the Voting Rights Act of 1965, as well as the confirmation of Thurgood Marshall to the U.S. Supreme Court. However, he voted for the Civil Rights Act of 1968. In 1983, Byrd voted in favor of making Martin Luther King Day a national holiday. In 2005, Byrd told The Washington Post that his membership in the Baptist church led to a change in his views. In the opinion of one reviewer, Byrd, like other Southern and border-state Democrats, came to realize that he would have to temper "his blatantly segregationist views" and move to the Democratic Party mainstream if he wanted to play a role nationally.

=== Vietnam ===
In February 1968, Byrd questioned Chairman of the Joint Chiefs of Staff Earle Wheeler during the latter's testimony to the Senate Armed Services Committee. During a White House meeting between President Johnson and congressional Democratic leaders on February 6, Byrd stated his concern for the ongoing Vietnam War, citing the U.S.'s lack of intelligence, preparation, underestimating of the morale and vitality of the Viet Cong, and overestimated how backed Americans would be by South Vietnam.

President Johnson rejected Byrd's observations. "Anyone can kick a barn down. It takes a good carpenter to build one".

=== 1968 presidential election ===
During the 1968 Democratic Party presidential primaries, Byrd supported the incumbent president Johnson. Of the challenging Robert F. Kennedy, Byrd said, "Bobby-come-lately has made a mistake. I won't even listen to him. There are many who liked his brother—as Bobby will find out—but who don't like him". Byrd praised Chicago Mayor Richard J. Daley's police response to protest activity at that year's Democratic National Convention, stating that the violence that resulted was the fault of the protesters, while the police only tried to restore order. Vice President Hubert Humphrey won the presidential nomination, and Byrd campaigned for him that fall.

=== Considered for U.S. Supreme Court nomination ===
In October 1971, President Nixon announced that he was considering nominating Byrd to the Supreme Court. Because Byrd was not a licensed attorney and had never passed the bar or practiced law, there was some opposition to his proposed nomination. Byrd later asked Nixon to withdraw his name from consideration.

=== Leadership roles ===
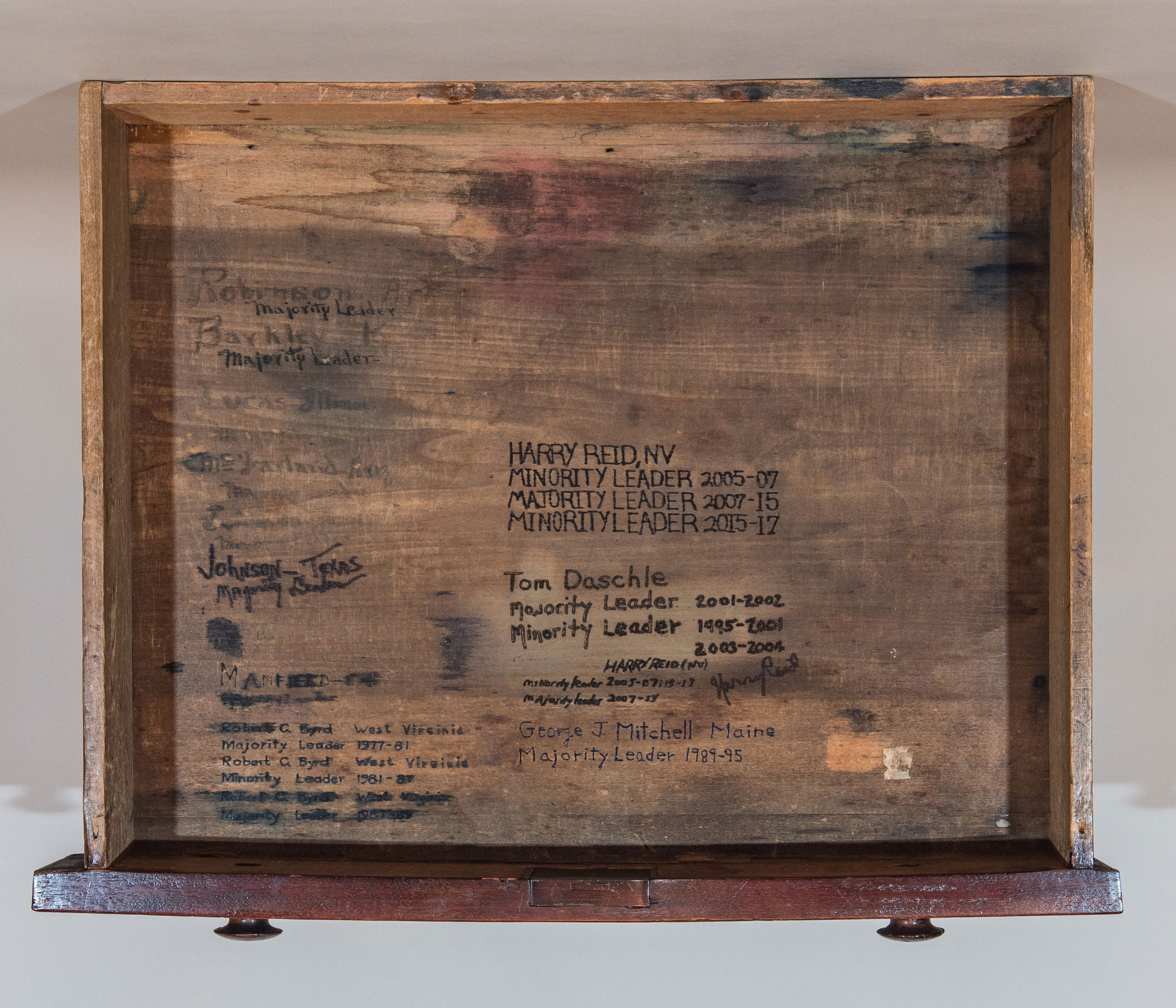
Drawer of the Senate desk used by Democratic leaders, including Byrd

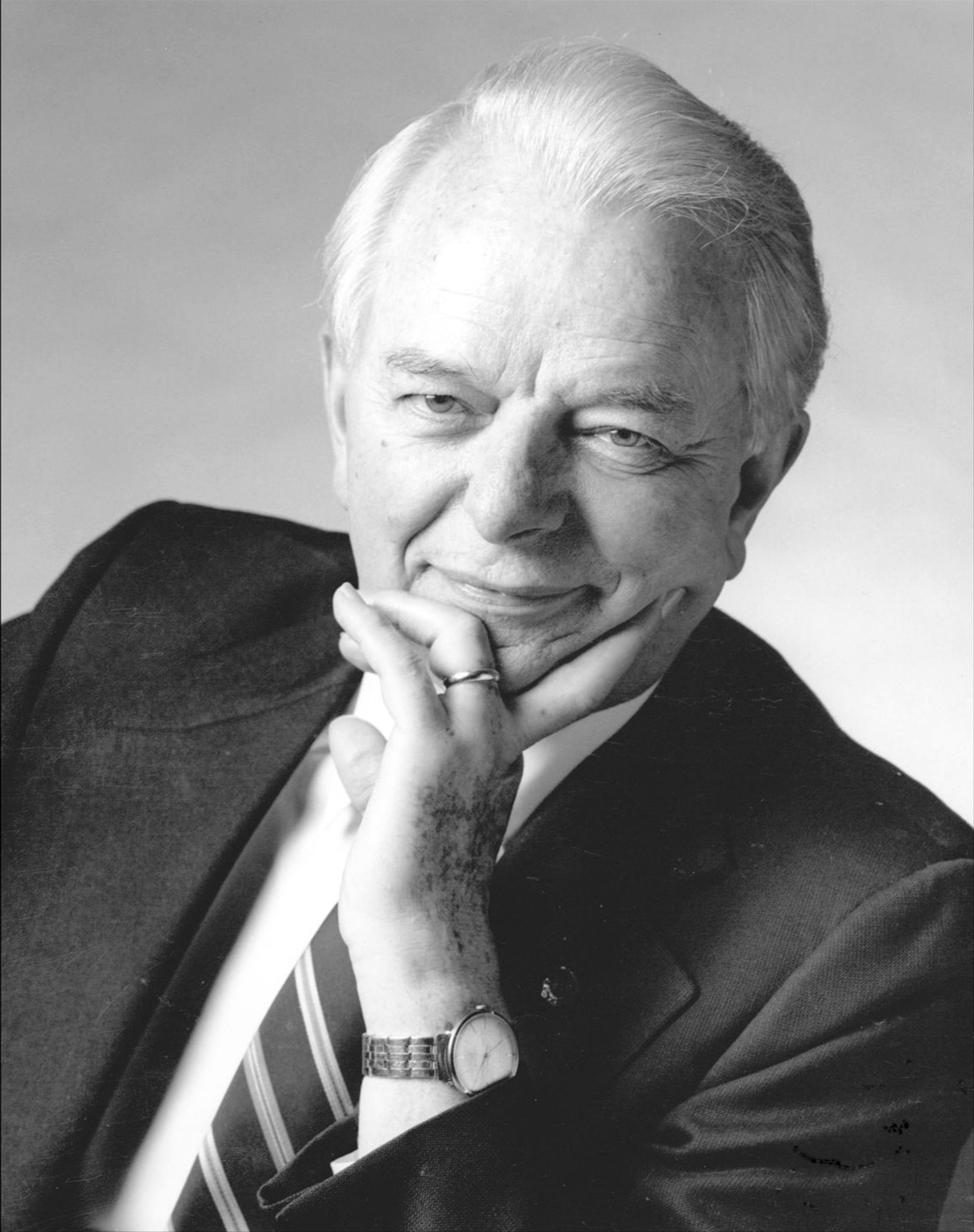
Byrd as president pro tempore of the Senate

Byrd served in the Senate Democratic leadership. He succeeded George Smathers as secretary of the Senate Democratic Conference from 1967 to 1971. He unseated Ted Kennedy in 1971 to become Majority Whip, the second highest-ranking Democrat, until 1977. Smathers recalled that, "Ted was off playing. While Ted was away at Christmas, down in the islands, floating around having a good time with some of his friends, male and female, here was Bob up here calling on the phone. 'I want to do this, and would you help me?' He had it all committed so that when Teddy got back to town, Teddy didn't know what hit him, but it was already all over. That was Lyndon Johnson's style. Bob Byrd learned that from watching Lyndon Johnson". Byrd himself had told Smathers that "I have never in my life played a game of cards. I have never in my life had a golf club in my hand. I have never in life hit a tennis ball. I have—believe it or not—never thrown a line over to catch a fish. I don't do any of those things. I have only had to work all my life. And every time you told me about swimming, I don't know how to swim".

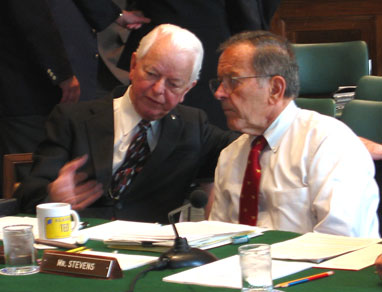
Byrd with Senator Ted Stevens in 2003

In the 1976 Democratic Party presidential primaries, Byrd was the "favorite son" presidential candidate in West Virginia's primary. His easy victory gave him control of the delegation to the Democratic National Convention. Byrd had the inside track as Majority Whip but focused most of his time running for Majority Leader, more so than for re-election to the Senate, as he was virtually unopposed for his fourth term. By the time the vote for Majority Leader came, his lead was so secure that his lone rival, Minnesota's Hubert Humphrey, withdrew before the balloting took place. From 1977 to 1989 Byrd was the leader of the Senate Democrats, serving as Majority Leader from 1977 to 1981 and 1987 to 1989, and as Minority Leader from 1981 to 1987.

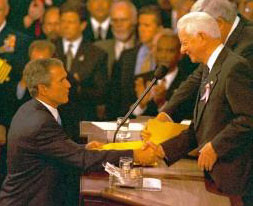
President pro tempore Byrd and House Speaker Dennis Hastert presided over a special joint session following the September 11, 2001 attacks. Here, President Bush shakes hands with Byrd.

==== Appropriations Committee ====
Byrd was known for steering federal dollars to West Virginia, one of the country's poorest states. He was called the "King of Pork" by Citizens Against Government Waste. After becoming chair of the Appropriations Committee in 1989, Byrd set a goal securing a total of $1 billion for public works in the state. He passed that mark in 1991, and funds for highways, dams, educational institutions, and federal agency offices flowed unabated over the course of his membership. More than 30 existing or pending federal projects bear his name. He commented on his reputation for attaining funds for projects in West Virginia in August 2006, when he called himself "Big Daddy" at the dedication for the Robert C. Byrd Biotechnology Science Center. Examples of this ability to claim funds and projects for his state include the Federal Bureau of Investigation's repository for computerized fingerprint records as well as several United States Coast Guard computing and office facilities.

==== Parliamentary expertise ====
Byrd was also known for using his knowledge of parliamentary procedure. Byrd frustrated Republicans with his encyclopedic knowledge of the inner workings of the Senate, particularly prior to the Reagan Era. From 1977 to 1979 he was described as "performing a procedural tap dance around the minority, outmaneuvering Republicans with his mastery of the Senate's arcane rules". In 1988, majority leader Byrd moved a call of the Senate, which was adopted by the majority present, in order to have the Sergeant-at-Arms arrest members not in attendance. One member (Robert Packwood, R-Oregon) was carried feet-first back to the chamber by the Sergeant-at-Arms in order to obtain a quorum.

==== President pro tempore ====
As the longest-serving Democratic senator, Byrd served as President pro tempore four times when his party was in the majority: from 1989 until the Republicans won control of the Senate in 1995; for 17 days in early 2001, when the Senate was evenly split between parties and outgoing Vice President Al Gore broke the tie in favor of the Democrats; when the Democrats regained the majority in June 2001 after Senator Jim Jeffords of Vermont left the Republican Party to become an independent; and again from 2007 to his death in 2010, as a result of the 2006 Senate elections. In this capacity, Byrd was third in the line of presidential succession at the time of his death, behind Vice President Joe Biden and House Speaker Nancy Pelosi.

=== Scholarships and TAH History Grants ===
In 1969, Byrd launched a Scholastic Recognition Award; he also began to present a savings bond to valedictorians from high schools—public and private—in West Virginia. In 1985 Congress approved the nation's only merit-based scholarship program funded through the U.S. Department of Education, a program which Congress later named in Byrd's honor. The Robert C. Byrd Honors Scholarship Program initially comprised a one-year, $1,500 award to students with "outstanding academic achievement" who had been accepted at a college or university. In 1993, the program began providing four-year scholarships.

In 2002 Byrd secured unanimous approval for a major national initiative to strengthen the teaching of "traditional American history" in K-12 public schools. The Department of Education competitively awards $50 to $120 million a year to school districts (in amounts of about $500,000 to $1 million). The money goes to teacher training programs that are geared to improving the knowledge of history teachers. The Continuing Appropriations Act, 2011 eliminated funding for the Robert C. Byrd Honors Scholarship Program.

=== Introduction of Television Cameras into the Senate ===
Television cameras were first introduced to the House of Representatives on March 19, 1979, by C-SPAN. Unsatisfied that Americans only saw Congress as the House of Representatives, Byrd and others pushed to televise Senate proceedings to prevent the Senate from becoming the "invisible branch" of government, succeeding in June 1986.

=== Senate historian ===
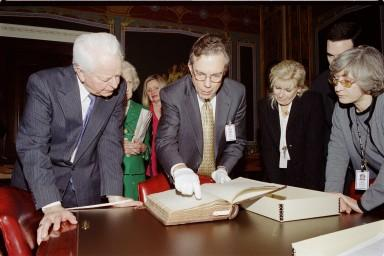
Byrd and Dr. Richard Baker, the Senate historian

External videos
- Booknotes interview with Byrd on The Senate: 1789–1989, June 18, 1989, C-SPAN

To help introduce the public to the inner workings of the legislative process, Byrd launched a series of one hundred speeches based on his examination of the Roman Republic and the intent of the Framers. Byrd published a four-volume series on Senate history: The Senate: 1789–1989: Addresses on the History of the Senate. The first volume won the Henry Adams Prize of the Society for History in the Federal Government as "an outstanding contribution to research in the history of the Federal Government". He also published The Senate of the Roman Republic: Addresses on the History of Roman Constitutionalism.

In 2004, Byrd received the American Historical Association's first Theodore Roosevelt-Woodrow Wilson Award for Civil Service; in 2007, Byrd received the Friend of History Award from the Organization of American Historians. Both awards honor individuals outside the academy who have made a significant contribution to the writing and/or presentation of history. In 2014, The Byrd Center for Legislative Studies (now the Robert C. Byrd Center for Congressional History and Education began assessing the archiving of Senator Byrd's electronic correspondence and floor speeches in order to preserve these documents and make them available to the wider community.

=== Final-term Senate highlights ===
Speech by Senator Byrd made to U.S. Senate following the indictment of Michael Vick on federal dog fighting charges

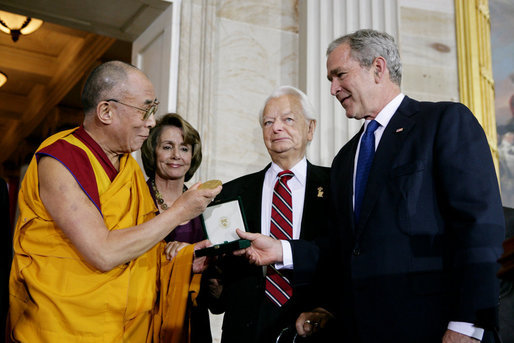
The Dalai Lama receiving a Congressional Gold Medal in 2007. From left: Tenzin Gyatso, Speaker Nancy Pelosi, Senate President pro tempore Robert Byrd and U.S. President George W. Bush

On July 19, 2007, Byrd gave a 25-minute speech in the Senate against dog fighting in response to the indictment of football player Michael Vick.

For 2007, Byrd was deemed the 14th-most powerful senator, as well as the 12th-most powerful Democratic senator.

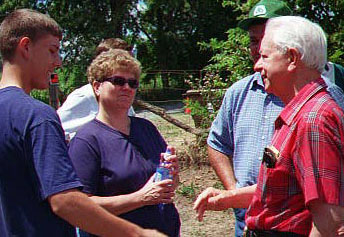
Byrd with farmers from West Virginia

On May 19, 2008, Byrd endorsed then-Senator Barack Obama for president. One week after the 2008 West Virginia Democratic presidential primary, in which Hillary Clinton defeated Obama by 67 to 25 percent, Byrd said, "Barack Obama is a noble-hearted patriot and humble Christian, and he has my full faith and support". When asked in October 2008 about the possibility that the issue of race would influence West Virginia voters, as Obama is African American, Byrd replied, "Those days are gone. Gone!" Obama lost West Virginia (by 13%) but won the election.

On January 26, 2009, Byrd was one of three Democrats to vote against the confirmation of Timothy Geithner as United States Secretary of the Treasury (along with Russ Feingold of Wisconsin and Tom Harkin of Iowa).

On February 26, 2009, Byrd was one of two Democrats to vote against the District of Columbia House Voting Rights Act of 2009, which if it had become law would have added a voting seat in the United States House of Representatives for the District of Columbia and add a seat for Utah, explaining that he supported the intent of the legislation, but regarded it as an attempt to solve with legislation an issue which required resolution with a Constitutional amendment. (Democrat Max Baucus of Montana also cast a "nay" vote.)

Although his health was poor, Byrd was present for every crucial vote during the December 2009 healthcare debate in the United States Senate; his vote was deemed essential so Democrats could obtain cloture to break a Republican filibuster. At the final vote on December 24, 2009, Byrd referenced recently deceased Senator Ted Kennedy, a devoted proponent, when casting his vote: "Mr. President, this is for my friend Ted Kennedy! Aye!"

== Electoral history ==
=== U.S. House elections ===
West Virginia's 6th congressional district, 1952
Party	Candidate	Votes	%	±%
Democratic	Robert Byrd	104,387	55.58%	
Republican	Latelle M. LaFollette Jr.	83,439	44.42%	
Turnout		187,826	100%	
Democratic hold				

West Virginia's 6th congressional district, 1954
Party	Candidate	Votes	%	±%
Democratic	Robert Byrd	73,535	62.73%	
Republican	Pat B. Withrow, Jr.	43,685	37.27%	
Turnout		117,220	100%	
Democratic hold				

West Virginia's 6th congressional district, 1956
Party	Candidate	Votes	%	±%
Democratic	Robert Byrd	99,854	57.40%	
Republican	Cleo S. Jones	74,110	42.60%	
Turnout		173,964	100%	
Democratic hold				

=== U.S. Senate elections ===
West Virginia United States Senate election, 1958
Party	Candidate	Votes	%	±%
Democratic	Robert Byrd	381,745	59.19%	
Republican	Chapman Revercomb	263,172	40.81%	
Turnout		644,917	100%	
Democratic hold				

West Virginia United States Senate election, 1964
Party	Candidate	Votes	%	±%
Democratic	Robert Byrd	515,015	67.67%	
Republican	Cooper P. Benedict	246,072	32.33%	
Turnout		761,087	100%	
Democratic hold				

West Virginia United States Senate election, 1970, Democratic Primary
Party	Candidate	Votes	%	±%
Democratic	Robert Byrd	195,725	67.67%	
Democratic	John J. McOwen	24,286	11.04%	
Turnout		220,011	100%	
Democratic hold				

West Virginia United States Senate election, 1970
Party	Candidate	Votes	%	±%
Democratic	Robert Byrd	345,965	77.64%	
Republican	Elmer Dodson	99,658	22.36%	
Turnout		445,623	100%	
Democratic hold				

West Virginia United States Senate election, 1976
Party	Candidate	Votes	%	±%
Democratic	Robert Byrd	566,359	100%	
Turnout		566,359	100%	
Democratic hold				

West Virginia United States Senate election, 1982
Party	Candidate	Votes	%	±%
Democratic	Robert Byrd	387,170	68.49%	
Republican	Cleve Benedict	173,910	30.76%	
Socialist Workers	William B. Howland	4,234	0.75%	
Turnout		565,314	100%	
Democratic hold				

West Virginia United States Senate election, 1988, Democratic Primary
Party	Candidate	Votes	%	±%
Democratic	Robert Byrd	252,767	80.77%	
Democratic	Bob Myers	60,186	19.23%	
Turnout		565,314	100%	
Democratic hold				

West Virginia United States Senate election, 1988:

- Robert Byrd (D) (inc.) - 410,983 (64.77%)
- Jay Wolfe (R) - 223,564 (35.23%)

West Virginia Democratic primary for the United States Senate, 1994:

- Robert Byrd (D) (inc.) - 190,061 (85.42%)
- James M. Fuller - 20,057 (9.01%)
- Paul Nuchims - 12,381 (5.57%)

West Virginia United States Senate election, 1994:

- Robert Byrd (D) (inc.) - 290,495 (69.01%)
- Stan Klos (R) - 130,441 (30.99%)

West Virginia United States Senate election, 2000:

- Robert Byrd (D) (inc.) - 469,215 (77.75%)
- David T. Gallaher (R) - 121,635 (20.16%)
- Joe Whelan (LBT) - 12,627 (2.09%)

West Virginia Democratic primary for the United States Senate, 2006:

- Robert Byrd (D) (inc.) - 159,154 (85.68%)
- Billy Hendricks Jr. - 26,609 (14.32%)

West Virginia United States Senate election, 2006:

- Robert Byrd (D) (inc.) - 291,058 (64.41%)
- John Raese (R) - 152,315 (33.71%)
- Jesse Johnson (Mountain) - 8,522 (1.89%)

=== Pro tempore elections ===
President pro tempore of the United States Senate, 1989:

- Robert Byrd (D) - 55 (55.00%)
- Strom Thurmond - 45 (45.00%)

President pro tempore of the United States Senate, 1991:

- Robert Byrd (D) (inc.) - 56 (56.00%)
- Strom Thurmond (R) - 44 (44.00%)

President pro tempore of the United States Senate, 1993:

- Robert Byrd (D) (inc.) - 57 (57.00%)
- Strom Thurmond (R) - 43 (43.00%)

President pro tempore of the United States Senate, 1995:

- Strom Thurmond (R) - 52 (52.00%)
- Robert Byrd (D) (inc.) - 48 (48.00%)

President pro tempore of the United States Senate, 1997:

- Strom Thurmond (R) (inc.) - 55 (55.00%)
- Robert Byrd - 45 (45.00%)

President pro tempore of the United States Senate, 1999:

- Strom Thurmond (R) (inc.) - 55 (55.00%)
- Robert Byrd - 45 (45.00%)

President pro tempore of the United States Senate, January 3, 2001:

- Robert Byrd (D) - 51 (50.50%)
- Strom Thurmond (R) (inc.) - 50 (49.51%)

Vice President Al Gore cast tie-breaking vote

President pro tempore of the United States Senate, January 20, 2001:

- Strom Thurmond (R) - 51 (50.50%)
- Robert Byrd (D) (inc.) - 50 (49.51%)

Vice President Dick Cheney cast tie-breaking vote

President pro tempore of the United States Senate, June 6, 2001:

- Robert Byrd (D) - 51 (51.00%)
- Strom Thurmond (R) (inc.) - 49 (49.00%)

President pro tempore of the United States Senate, 2003:

- Ted Stevens (R) - 51 (51.00%)
- Robert Byrd (D) (inc.) - 49 (49.00%)

President pro tempore of the United States Senate, 2005:

- Ted Stevens (R) (inc.) - 55 (55.00%)
- Robert Byrd - 45 (45.00%)

President pro tempore of the United States Senate, 2007:

- Robert Byrd (D) - 51 (51.00%)
- Ted Stevens (R) (inc.) - 49 (49.00%)

President pro tempore of the United States Senate, 2009:

- Robert Byrd (D) (inc.) - 58 (58.59%)
- Richard Lugar (R) - 41 (41.41%)

=== Presidential elections ===
West Virginia Democratic Presidential primary, 1976:

- Robert Byrd - 331,639 (89.01%)
- George Wallace - 40,938 (10.99%)

Florida Democratic Presidential primary, 1976:

- Jimmy Carter - 448,844 (34.52%)
- George Wallace - 396,820 (30.52%)
- Henry M. Jackson - 310,944 (23.91%)
- None of Names Shown - 37,626 (2.89%)
- Milton Shapp - 32,198 (2.48%)
- Mo Udall - 27,235 (2.09%)
- Birch Bayh - 8,750 (0.67%)
- Arthur O. Blessitt - 7,889 (0.61%)
- Ellen McCormack - 7,595 (0.58%)
- Sargent Shriver - 7,084 (0.55%)
- Fred R. Harris - 5,397 (0.42%)
- Robert Byrd - 5,042 (0.39%)
- Frank Church - 4,906 (0.38%)

Georgia Democratic Presidential primary, 1976:

- Jimmy Carter - 419,272 (83.44%)
- George Wallace - 57,594 (11.46%)
- Mo Udall - 9,755 (1.94%)
- Robert Byrd - 3,628 (0.72%)
- Henry M. Jackson - 3,358 (0.67%)
- Frank Church - 2,477 (0.49%)
- Frank Joseph Ahern - 1,487 (0.30%)
- Sargent Shriver - 1,378 (0.27%)
- Birch Bayh - 824 (0.16%)
- Fred R. Harris - 699 (0.14%)
- Ellen McCormack - 635 (0.13%)
- Abram Eisenman - 351 (0.07%)
- Lloyd Bentsen - 277 (0.06%)
- Frank Bona - 263 (0.05%)
- Milton Shapp - 181 (0.04%)
- George Roden - 153 (0.03%)
- Bob Kelleher - 139 (0.03%)

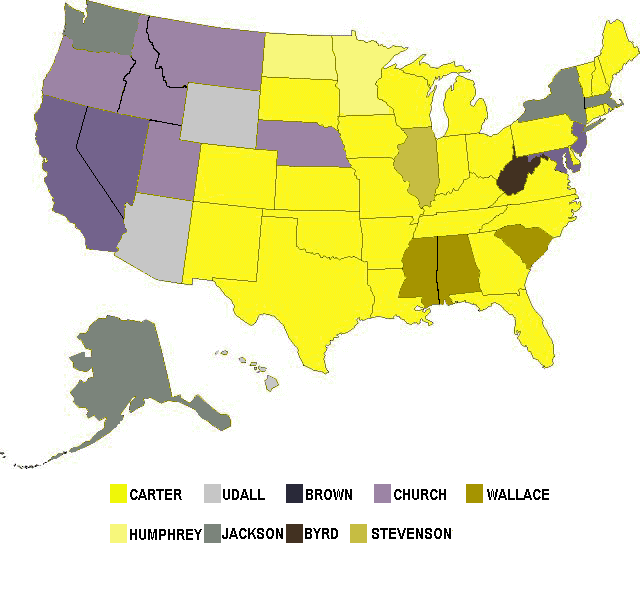
1976 Democratic Presidential primaries results by state

1976 Democratic Presidential primaries:

- Jimmy Carter - 6,235,609 (39.19%)
- Jerry Brown - 2,449,374 (15.39%)
- George Wallace - 1,955,388 (12.29%)
- Mo Udall - 1,611,754 (10.13%)
- Henry M. Jackson - 1,134,375 (7.13%)
- Frank Church - 830,818 (5.22%)
- Robert Byrd - 340,309 (2.14%)
- Sargent Shriver - 304,399 (1.91%)
- Unpledged delegates - 283,437 (1.78%)
- Ellen McCormack - 238,027 (1.50%)
- Fred R. Harris - 234,568 (1.47%)
- Milton Shapp - 88,254 (0.56%)
- Birch Bayh - 86,438 (0.54%)
- Hubert Humphrey - 61,992 (0.39%)
- Ted Kennedy - 19,805 (0.12%)
- Arthur O. Blessitt - 8,717 (0.06%)
- Lloyd Bentsen - 4,046 (0.03%)

1976 Democratic National Convention (Presidential tally):

- Jimmy Carter - 2,239 (74.48%)
- Mo Udall - 330 (10.98%)
- Jerry Brown - 301 (10.01%)
- George Wallace - 57 (1.90%)
- Ellen McCormack - 22 (0.73%)
- Frank Church - 19 (0.63%)
- Hubert Humphrey - 10 (0.33%)
- Henry M. Jackson - 10 (0.33%)
- Fred R. Harris - 9 (0.30%)
- Milton Shapp - 2 (0.07%)
- Robert Byrd, Cesar Chavez, Leon Jaworski, Barbara Jordan, Ted Kennedy, Jennings Randolph, Fred Stover - each 1 vote (0.03%)

1980 Democratic National Convention (Presidential tally):

- Jimmy Carter (inc.) - 2,123 (64.04%)
- Ted Kennedy - 1,151 (34.72%)
- William Proxmire - 10 (0.30%)
- Koryne Kaneski Horbal - 5 (0.15%)
- Scott M. Matheson, Sr. - 5 (0.15%)
- Ron Dellums - 3 (0.09%)
- Robert Byrd - 2 (0.06%)
- John Culver - 2 (0.06%)
- Kent Hance - 2 (0.06%)
- Jennings Randolph - 2 (0.06%)
- Warren Spannaus - 2 (0.06%)
- Alice Tripp - 2 (0.06%)
- Jerry Brown - 1 (0.03%)
- Dale Bumpers - 1 (0.03%)
- Hugh L. Carey - 1 (0.03%)
- Walter Mondale - 1 (0.03%)
- Edmund Muskie - 1 (0.03%)
- Thomas J. Steed - 1 (0.03%)

== Political views ==
=== Race ===
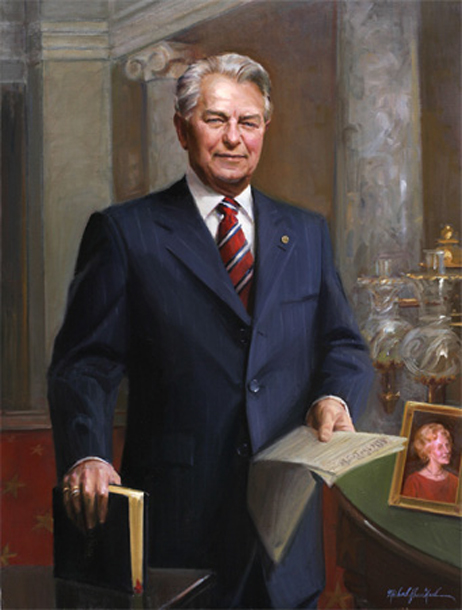
Portrait of Byrd as Majority Leader

Byrd initially compiled a mixed record on the subjects of race relations and desegregation. While he initially voted against civil rights legislation, in 1959 he hired one of the Capitol's first Black congressional aides, and he also took steps to integrate the United States Capitol Police for the first time since the Reconstruction Era. Beginning in the 1970s, Byrd explicitly renounced his earlier support of racial segregation. Byrd said that he regretted filibustering and voting against the Civil Rights Act of 1964 and would change it if he had the opportunity. Byrd also said that his views changed dramatically after his teenage grandson was killed in a 1982 traffic accident, which put him in a deep emotional valley. "The death of my grandson caused me to stop and think," said Byrd, adding he came to realize that African Americans love their children and grandchildren as much as he loved his. During debate in 1983 over the passage of the law creating the Martin Luther King Jr. Day holiday, Byrd grasped the symbolism of the day and its significance to his legacy, telling members of his staff "I'm the only one in the Senate who must vote for this bill".

Of the eight U.S. Senate members to vote on the confirmations of both Thurgood Marshall and Clarence Thomas to the United States Supreme Court (the others being Daniel Inouye of Hawaii, Ted Kennedy of Massachusetts, Quentin Burdick of North Dakota, Mark Hatfield of Oregon, Claiborne Pell of Rhode Island, and Fritz Hollings and Strom Thurmond of South Carolina), Byrd was the only U.S. Senate member to vote against confirming both of the first two African-American nominees to the Court in its history. In Marshall's case, Byrd asked FBI Director J. Edgar Hoover to look into the possibility that Marshall had either connections to communists or a communist past. With respect to Thomas, Byrd stated that he was offended by Thomas's use of the phrase "high-tech lynching of uppity blacks" in his defense and that he was "offended by the injection of racism" into the hearing. He called Thomas's comments a "diversionary tactic" and said, "I thought we were past that stage". Regarding Anita Hill's sexual harassment charges against Thomas, Byrd supported Hill. Byrd joined 45 other Democrats in voting against confirming Thomas to the Supreme Court.

On March 29, 1968, Byrd criticized a Memphis, Tennessee, protest: "It was a shameful and totally uncalled for outburst of lawlessness undoubtedly encouraged to some considerable degree, at least, by his [Dr. King's] words and actions, and his presence. There is no reason for us to believe that the same destructive rioting and violence cannot, or that it will not, happen here if King attempts his so-called Poor People's March, for what he plans in Washington appears to be something on a far greater scale than what he had indicated he planned to do in Memphis".

In a March 2, 2001, interview with Tony Snow, Byrd said of race relations:

They're much, much better than they've ever been in my life-time ... I think we talk about race too much. I think those problems are largely behind us ... I just think we talk so much about it that we help to create somewhat of an illusion. I think we try to have good will. My old mom told me, 'Robert, you can't go to heaven if you hate anybody.' We practice that. There are white niggers. I've seen a lot of white niggers in my time, if you want to use that word. We just need to work together to make our country a better country, and I'd just as soon quit talking about it so much.

Byrd's use of the term "white nigger" created immediate controversy. When asked about it, Byrd's office provided this in a written response,

I apologize for the characterization I used on this program ... The phrase dates back to my boyhood and has no place in today's society ... In my attempt to articulate strongly held feelings, I have offended people that I never intended to offend.

For the 2003–2004 session, the NAACP (National Association for the Advancement of Colored People) rated Byrd's voting record as being 100% in line with the NAACP's position on the thirty-three Senate bills they evaluated. Sixteen other senators received that rating. In June 2005, Byrd proposed an additional $10,000,000 in federal funding for the Martin Luther King Jr. Memorial in Washington, D.C., remarking that, "With the passage of time, we have come to learn that his Dream was the American Dream, and few ever expressed it more eloquently". Upon news of his death, the NAACP released a statement praising Byrd, saying that he "became a champion for civil rights and liberties" and "came to consistently support the NAACP civil rights agenda".

=== Clinton impeachment ===
Byrd initially said that the impeachment proceedings against Clinton should be taken seriously. Although he harshly criticized any attempt to make light of the allegations, he made the motion to dismiss the charges and effectively end the matter. Even though he voted against both articles of impeachment, he was the sole Democrat to vote to censure Clinton.

=== LGBT rights ===
Byrd strongly opposed Clinton's 1993 efforts to allow homosexuals to serve in the military and supported efforts to limit same-sex marriage. In 1996, before the passage of the Defense of Marriage Act, he said, "The drive for same-sex marriage is, in effect, an effort to make a sneak attack on society by encoding this aberrant behavior in legal form before society itself has decided it should be legal. […] Let us defend the oldest institution, the institution of marriage between male and female as set forth in the Holy Bible".

Despite his previous position, he later stated his opposition to the Federal Marriage Amendment and argued that it was unnecessary because the states already had the power to ban gay marriages. However, when the amendment came to the Senate floor, he was one of the two Democratic senators who voted in favor of cloture.

=== Abortion ===
On March 11, 1982, Byrd voted against a measure sponsored by Senator Orrin Hatch that sought to reverse Roe v. Wade and allow Congress and individual states to adopt laws banning abortions. Its passing was the first time a congressional committee supported an anti-abortion amendment.

In 1995, Byrd voted against a ban on intact dilation and extraction, a late-term abortion procedure typically referred to by its opponents as "partial-birth abortion". In 2003, however, he voted for the Partial-Birth Abortion Ban Act, which prohibits intact dilation and extraction. Byrd also voted against the 2004 Unborn Victims of Violence Act, which recognizes a "child in utero" as a legal victim if he or she is injured or killed during the commission of a crime of violence.

=== Richard Nixon era ===
In April 1970, the Senate Judiciary Committee approved a plan to replace the United States Electoral College with direct elections of presidents. Byrd initially opposed direct elections on the key vote and was one of two senators to switch votes in favor of the proposal during later votes.

In April 1970, as the Senate Judiciary Committee delayed a vote on Supreme Court nominee Harry Blackmun, Byrd stated that "no nomination should be voted on within 24 hours after the hearing" after the previous two Supreme Court nominees had delays and was one of the 17 committee members who went on record of assuring Blackmun's nomination would be reported favorably to the full Senate.

In October 1970, Byrd sponsored an amendment protecting members of Congress and those elected that have not yet assumed office. Byrd mentioned the 88 political assassinations in the United States and said state law was not adequate to handle the increase in political violence.

In February 1971, after Fred R. Harris and Charles Mathias requested the United States Senate Committee on Rules and Administration change the rules to permit selection of committee chairmen on a basis aside from seniority, Byrd indicated through his line of questioning that he saw considerable value in the seniority system.

In April 1971, after Representative Hale Boggs stated that he had been tapped by the Federal Bureau of Investigation and called on FBI Director J. Edgar Hoover to resign, Byrd opined that Boggs' imagination was involved and called on him to reveal any possible "good, substantial, bona fide evidence".

In April 1971, Byrd met with President Nixon, Hugh Scott, and Robert P. Griffin for a briefing that after which Byrd, Scott, and Griffin asserted they had been told by Nixon of his intent to withdraw American forces from Indochina by a specific date. White House Press Secretary Ronald L. Ziegler disputed their claims by stating that the three had not been told anything by Nixon he had not mentioned in his speech the same day as the meeting.

In April 1971, Jacob Javits, Fred R. Harris, and Charles H. Percy circulated letters to their fellow senators in an attempt to gain cosponsors for a resolution to appoint the Senate's first girl pages. Byrd maintained that the Senate was ill-equipped for girl pages and was among those that cited the long hours of work, the carrying of sometimes heavy documents and the high crime rate in the Capitol area as among the reasons against it.

In September 1971, Representative Richard H. Poff was under consideration by President Nixon for a Supreme Court nomination, Byrd warning Poff that his nomination could be met with opposition by liberal senators and see a filibuster emerge. Within hours, Poff announced his declining of the nomination.

In April 1972, Senate Majority Leader Mansfield announced that he had authorized Byrd to present an amendment to the Senate for a fixed deadline for total troop withdrawal that the Nixon adminition would be obligated to meet and that the measure would serve as an amendment to the State Department‐United States Information Agency authorization bill.

In April 1972, the Senate Judiciary Committee approved the nomination of Richard Kleindienst as United States Attorney General, Byrd being one of four Democrats to support the nomination. On June 7, Byrd announced that he would vote against Kleindienst, saying in a news release that this was Nixon's first nomination that he had not voted to confirm and that testimony at hearings investigating Kleindienst's tenure at ITT Inc. displayed "a show of arrogance and deception and insensitivity to the people's right to know". During the confirmation hearings of Kleindienst's successor Elliot Richardson, Byrd insisted on the appointment of a special counsel to investigate the Watergate scandal as a condition for his appointment, eventually leading to the Archibald Cox investigation.

In a May 1972 luncheon speech, Byrd criticized American newspapers for "an increasing tendency toward shoddy technical production" and observed that there was "a greater schism between the Nixon Administration and the media, at least publicly, than at any previous time in our history".

In May 1972, Byrd introduced a proposal supported by the Nixon administration that would make cutting off all funding for American hostilities in Indochina conditional upon agreement on an internationally supervised cease‐fire. Byrd and Nixon supporters argued modification would bring the amendment more in line with President Nixon's proposal to withdraw all American forces from Vietnam the previous week and it was approved in the Senate by a vote of 47 to 43.

In September 1972, Edward Brooke attempted to reintroduce his war ending amendment that had been defeated earlier in the week as an addendum to a clean drinking water bill when he discovered that Byrd had arranged a unanimous consent free agreement prohibiting amendments that were not relevant to the subject. Brooke charged the Byrd agreements with impairing his senatorial prerogatives to introduce amendments.

During the 1972 general election campaign, Democratic nominee George McGovern advocated for partial amnesty for draft dodges. Byrd responded to the position in a November speech the day before the election without mentioning McGovern by name in saying, "How could we keep faith with the thousands of Americans we sent to Vietnam by giving a mere tap on the wrist to those who fled to Canada and Sweden?" Byrd said the welfare proposals were part of "pernicious doctrine that the Federal Government owes a living to people who don't want to work" and chastised individuals that had personal trips to Hanoi rather than official missions as "the Ramsey Clarks in our society who attempt to deal unilaterally with the enemy".

In January 1973, the Senate passed legislation containing an amendment Byrd offered requiring President Nixon to give Congress an accounting of all funds that he had impounded and appropriated by February 5. Byrd stated that President Nixon had been required to submit reports to Congress and that he had not done so since June, leaving Congress in the dark on the matter.

In February 1973, the Senate approved legislation requiring confirmation of the director and deputy director of the Office of Management and Budget in the White House in what was seen as "another battleground for the dispute between Congress and the White House over cuts in social spending programs in the current Federal budget and in the Nixon Administration's spending request for the fiscal year 1974, which begins next July 1". The legislation contained an amendment sponsored by Byrd limiting the budget officials to a maximum term of four years before having another confirmation proceeding. Byrd introduced another amendment that required all Cabinet officers be required to undergo reconfirmation by the Senate in the event that they are retained from one administration to another.

In March 1973, Byrd led Senate efforts to reject a proposal that would have made most critical committee meetings open to the public, arguing that tampering with "the rides of the Senate is to tamper with the Senate itself" and argued against changing "procedures which, over the long past, have contributed to stability and efficiency in the operation of the Senate". The Senate voted down the proposal 47 to 38 on March 7.

On May 2, 1973, the anniversary of FBI Director J. Edgar Hoover's death, Byrd called on President Nixon to appoint a permanent successor for Hoover as FBI Director.

In June 1973, Byrd sponsored a bill that would impose the first Tuesday in October as the date for all federal elections and mandate that states hold primary elections for federal elections between the first Tuesday in June and the first Tuesday in July. The United States Senate Committee on Rules and Administration approved the measure on June 13 and it was sent to the Senate floor for consideration.

In June 1973, along with Lloyd Bentsen, Mike Mansfield, John Tower, and Jennings Randolph, Byrd was one of five senators to switch their vote on the foreign military aid authorization bill to assure its passage after previously voting against it.

In October 1973, President Nixon vetoed the request of the United States Information Agency for $208 million for fiscal year 1974 on the grounds of a provision forcing the agency to provide any document or information demanded. Byrd introduced a bill identical to the one vetoed by Nixon the following month, differing in not containing the information provision as well as a ban on appropriating or spending more money than the annual budget called for, the Senate approving the legislation on November 13.

In November 1973, after the Senate rejected an amendment to the National Energy Emergency Act intending to direct President Nixon to put gasoline rationing into effect on January 15, Byrd indicated the final vote not coming for multiple days.

In June 1974, the Senate confirmed John C. Sawhill as Federal Energy Administrator only to rescind the confirmation hours later, the direct result of James Abourezk wanting to speak out and vote against the nomination due to the Nixon administration's refusal to roll back crude oil prices. Abourezk confirmed that he had asked Byrd for notice of when he could assume the Senate floor to deliver his remarks. Byrd was absent when present members passed the nomination as part of their efforts to clear the chamber's executive calendar and rescinded the confirmation.

==== Nixon resignation ====
In May 1974, the House Judiciary Committee opened impeachment hearings against President Nixon after the release of 1,200 pages of transcripts of White House conversations between him and his aides and the administration became engulfed in the scandal that would come to be known as Watergate. That month, Byrd delivered a speech on the Senate floor opposing Nixon's potential resignation, saying it would serve only to convince the President's supporters that his enemies had driven him out of office: "The question of guilt or innocence would never be fully resolved. The country would remain polarized — more so than it is today. And confidence in government would remain unrestored". Most of the members of the Senate in attendance for the address were conservatives from both parties that shared opposition to Nixon being removed from office. Byrd was among multiple conservative senators who stated that they would not ask Nixon to resign. Later that month, Republican attorney general Elliot L. Richardson termed Nixon "a law and order President who says subpoenas must be answered by everyone except himself," the comment being echoed by Byrd who additionally charged President Nixon with reneging on his public pledge that the independence of the special prosecutor to pursue the Watergate investigation would not be limited without the prior approval of a majority of congressional leaders.

On July 29, Byrd met with Senate Majority Leader Mike Mansfield, Minority Leader Hugh Scott, and Republican whip Robert P. Griffin in the first formality by Senate leaders on the matter of President Nixon's impeachment. Byrd opposed Nixon being granted immunity. The New York Times noted that as Chairman of the Republican National Committee George H. W. Bush issued a formal statement indicating no chance for the Nixon administration to be salvaged, Byrd was advocating for President Nixon to face some punishment for the illegal activities of the administration and that former vice president Spiro Agnew should have been imprisoned. The Senate leadership met throughout August 7 to discuss Nixon's fate, the topic of immunity being mentioned in the office of Hugh Scott. Nixon announced his resignation the following day and resigned on August 9. The resignation led to Congress rearranging their intent from an impeachment to the confirmation of a new vice presidential nominee and the Senate scheduled a recess between August 23 to September 14, Byrd opining, "What the country needs is for all of us to get out of Washington and let the country have a breath of fresh air". By August 11, Hugh Scott announced he was finding fewer members of Congress from either party committed to criminally prosecuting former president Nixon over Watergate, Byrd and Majority Leader Mansfield both indicating their favoring for Nixon's culpability being left in the consideration of Special Prosecutor Leon Jaworski and the Watergate grand jury.

=== Gerald Ford era ===
On November 22, 1974, the Senate Rules Committee voted unanimously to recommend the nomination of Nelson Rockefeller as Vice President of the United States to the full Senate. Byrd admitted that he had preferred sending the nomination with no recommendation but was worried the act would apply prejudice to the nominee.

In January 1975, after President Ford requested $300 million in additional military aid for South Vietnam and $222 million more for the Khmer Republic from Congress, Byrd said Ford and Secretary of State Henry Kissinger had described the aid as "imperative" and that congressional leaders had been told North Vietnam would take over Saigon "little by little" if additional ammunition and other aid were not provided by the US to Saigon. In February, along with Mike Mansfield, Hugh Scott, and Robert P. Griffin, Byrd was one of four senators to sponsor a compromise modification of the Senate's filibuster rule where three-fifths of the total Senate membership would be adequate in invoking closure on any measure except a change in the Senate's rules. In March, while the Senate voted on reforming its filibuster rule, James Allen and other senators used their allotted time to speak at length and also force a series of votes. In response, Byrd said the group was engaging in an "exercise in futility" and that the chamber had already made up its mind. In April, after President Ford and his administration's lawyers contended that Ford had authority as president to use troops under the War Powers Act, Byrd and Thomas F. Eagleton objected by charging that Ford was establishing a dangerous precedent. Byrd issued a statement on the Senate floor admitting his "serious reservations" pertaining to the Ford administration's intent to bring roughly 130,000 South Vietnamese refugees to the United States, citing cultural differences and unemployment as raising "grave doubts about the wisdom of bringing any sizable number of evacuees here". In May, after President Ford appealed for Americans to support the resettlement of 130,000 Vietnamese and Cambodians in the US, Byrd told reporters that he believed that President Ford's request for $507 million for refugee transport and resettlement would be reduced, citing its lack of political support in the United States. In September, Byrd sponsored an amendment to the appropriations bill that if enacted would bar the education department from ordering busing to the school nearest to a pupil's home and sought to hold the Senate floor until there was an agreement among colleagues on his proposal. This failed, as the time limit for debating various proposals ran out. On November 10, Byrd met with President Ford for a discussion on the New York loan guarantee bill.

In April 1976, Byrd was one of five members of the Senate Select Committee to vote for a requirement that the proposed oversight committee would share Its jurisdiction with four committees that had authority over intelligence operations. In June, after the Senate Judiciary Committee voted to send a bill breaking up 18 large oil companies into separate production, refining and refining‐marketing entities to the Senate floor, Byrd announced his opposition to divestiture and joined Republicans Hugh Scott and Charles Mathias in confirming their votes were to report the bill. In September, Congress overrode President Ford's veto of a $56 billion appropriations bill for social services, Ford afterward telling Byrd and House Speaker Carl Albert that he would sign two bills supported by the Democrats.

Byrd was elected majority leader on January 4, 1977. On January 14, President Ford met with congressional leadership to announce his proposals for pay increases of high government officials, Byrd afterward telling reporters that the president had also stated his intent to recommend that the raises be linked to a code of conduct. Days later, after the Senate established a special 15‐member committee to draw up a code of ethics for senators, Byrd told reporters that he was supportive of the measure and that it would be composed of eight Democrats and seven Republicans who would have until March 1 to issue a draft code that would then be subject to change by the full Senate.

=== Jimmy Carter era ===
In January 1977, after President-elect Carter announced his nomination of Ted Sorensen to be Director of Central Intelligence, Byrd admitted to reporters that there could be difficulty securing a Senate confirmation. Conservative opposition to Sorenson's nomination led Carter to conclude that he could not be confirmed, and Carter withdrawing it without the Senate taking action.

==== Role in changes in Senate rules ====
On January 18, 1977, after the Senate established a special 15‐member committee to draw up a code of ethics for senators, Byrd and Senate Minority Leader Howard Baker announced their support for the resolution, Byrd adding that knowledge of the code of ethics being enacted in the Senate would be privy to the public, press, and members of the Senate. While eight of Carter's secretaries were confirmed within the first hours of his presidency, Byrd made an unsuccessful effort to secure a date and time limit for debate on the confirmation of Ray Marshall, Carter's nominee for United States Secretary of Labor.

Between January and February 1979, Byrd proposed outlawing tactics frequently used to prevent him from bringing a bill to the floor for consideration. He stated the filibuster tactics gave the Senate a bad reputation and rendered it ineffective. His proposals initially earned the opposition of Republicans and conservative Democrats until there was a compromise for the reform package to be split and have the less objectionable part come up first for consideration. The Senate passed legislation curtailing tactics that had been used in the past to continue filibusters after cloture had been invoked on February 22. In March, Byrd negotiated an agreement that a proposed amendment was referred to the Judiciary Committee and would be reported by April 10. The arrangement stated that Byrd could call up the proposed amendment any time following June 1 and his action would not be subject to a filibuster while the resolution embodying the amendment will.

==== Domestic issues ====
In October 1977, Byrd stated his refusal to authorize the Senate dropping consideration of the natural gas legislation under any circumstances, predicting the matter would be settled in the coming days as a result of conversations with colleagues he had the night before and a growing disillusion with filibusters in place of action on legislation. Byrd added that the deregulation bill would not become law due to it being identical to the Carter administration's proposal and President Carter's prior statement that he would veto deregulation bills.

In May 1978, Byrd announced that he would not move to end a filibuster against the Carter administration's labor law revision bill until after the Memorial Day recess. The decision was seen as allowing wavering senators to not be cornered on their votes as lobbying efforts for both business and labor commenced and various opponents of the bill viewed Byrd's call as a sign of weakness toward the Carter administration. Byrd stated that his decision to wait was "to give ample time for debate on the measure" and that he was expecting the first petition to end the filibuster to come sometime following the Senate returning in June.

In March 1979, after Attorney General Griffin Bell named a special counsel in the Carter warehouse investigation, Byrd stated his dissatisfaction with the move in a Senate floor speech, citing the existence of legislation approved by Congress the previous year that would allow the appointment of a special prosecutor. In June, director of Public Citizen's Congress Watch Mark Green stated that President Carter had told him that Majority Leader Byrd had threatened that he would personally lead a filibuster against any attempt to extend controls on domestic oil prices. In response, Byrd's press secretary Mike Willard confirmed that Byrd told President Carter he would not vote for cloture in the event of a filibuster. Days later, after the Senate voted to grant President Carter authority to set energy conservation targets for each of the 50 states and allow Carter to impose mandatory measures on any statfailed to implement a plan to meet the targets he set, Byrd reaffirmed his opposition to attempts aimed at President Carter's decision to remove price controls from crude oil produced within the United States. In November, Byrd stated that the United States did not have an alternative to coal when attempting to meet its energy needs and that the technology needed to turn coal into liquid fuel at a lower cost than that of producing gasoline had already been made available, opining that doing this would solve most environmental problems. Weeks later, Sergeant at Arms of the United States Senate F. Nordy Hoffman sent a letter to Byrd warning him to take precautions against possible attacks by religious fanatics and nationalist terrorists and advocating for senators to "vary their daily routines, take different routes to and from the Senate, exchange their personalized license plates for those that provide anonymity and be generally alert to the possibility of attack". Byrd distributed the letter to the other members of the chamber of Congress. In December, the Senate voted on a Republican proposal to limit overall Government tax revenue that would also yield an annual tax cut of $39 to $55 billion over the course of the following four years. Republican William Roth sponsored an amendment that Byrd moved to table Senator Roth's request for a budget waiver and won by five votes. The Senate narrowly blocked the proposal. By December, congressional leadership was aiming for President Carter to sign a new synthetic fuels bill before Christmas, with Byrd wanting the bill to contain a $185 billion revenue that was achieved in a minimum tax provision. Later that month, after the Senate approved $1.5 billion in Federal loan guarantees for the Chrysler Corporation tonight after defeating a proposal to provide emergency, Byrd confirmed that he had spoken with United States Secretary of the Treasury G. William Miller about what Byrd called "excellent" chances that the Senate would complete work on a federal loans guarantees bill for Chrysler.

In August 1980, Byrd stated that Congress was unlikely to pass a tax cut before the November elections despite the Senate being in the mood for passing one.

==== Turkey ====
In July 1978, Byrd introduced and endorsed a proposal by George McGovern for an amendment to repeal the 42‐month‐old embargo on American military assistance for Turkey that also linked any future aid for that country to progress on a negotiated settlement of the Cyprus problem. The Senate approved the amendment in a vote of 57 to 42 as part of a $2.9 billion international security assistance bill. Byrd stated that every government in the NATO alliance except Greece favored repeal of the embargo.

In May 1979, Byrd stated that giving Turkey a grant should not be construed as retaliation against Greece and that aid for Turkey would improve Turkey's security in addition to that of Greece, NATO, and of American allies in the Middle East. Byrd mentioned his encouragement from the report on the Greek and Turkish Cypriot communities agreeing to resume negotiations on the island's future as well as reports that progress was also being made on the reintegration of Greece into NATO. Byrd furthered that American military installations in Turkey were "of major importance in the monitoring of Soviet strategic activities" and would have "obvious significance" in the goal of verifying compliance by the Soviet Union with the strategic arms treaty. The Senate approved the Turkey grant, to Byrd's wishes, but against that of both President Carter and the Senate Foreign Relations Committee.

==== Foreign policy ====
On February 2, 1978, Byrd and Minority Leader Baker invited all other senators to join them in sponsoring two amendments to the Torrijos–Carter Treaties, the two party leaders sending copies of amendments recommended by the Foreign Relations Committee the previous week.

In January 1979, Byrd met with Deputy Prime Minister of China Deng Xiaoping for assurances by Deng that China hoped to unite Taiwan to the mainland by peaceful means and would fully respect "the present realities" on the island. Byrd afterward stated that his concern on the Taiwan question had been allayed. In June, Byrd opined that a decision by President Carter to not proceed with the new missile system would kill the strategic arms limitation treaty in the Senate. Byrd held meetings with Soviet leaders between July 3 to July 4. Following their conclusion, Byrd said he was still undecided on supporting the arms pact and that there had been talks on "the need on both sides for avoidance of inflammatory rhetoric which can only be counterproductive". On September 23, Byrd stated that it was possible the Senate could complete the strategic arms limitation treaty that year but a delay until the following year could result in its defeat, adding that senators might have to remain in session during Christmas to ensure the treaty was voted on before 1979's end. Byrd noted that he was opposed to the treaty being "held hostage to the Cuban situation" as American interests could be harmed in the event the treaty was defeated solely due to Soviet Armed Forces troops being in Cuba. In November, Byrd admitted to complaining to President Carter about Senate leadership receiving only occasional briefings about the Iranian hostage crisis and that Carter had agreed to daily consultations for Minority Leader Howard Baker, chairman of the Foreign Relations Committee Frank Church, and ranking Republican member of the Foreign Relations Committee Jacob Javits. Byrd added that he did not disagree with the move by the Carter administration to admit Mohammad Reza Pahlavi for hospitalization and that the same action would extend to "Ayatollah Khomeini himself if he were needing medical treatment and had a terminal illness". On December 3, Byrd told reporters that the Iranian hostage crisis was making the Senate uninhabitable for a debate on the strategic arms treaty, noting that a discussion could still occur before the Senate adjourned on December 21 but that he did not believe he would call up the opportunity even if granted the chance. Days later, Byrd announced there was no chance that the Senate would take up debate on the strategic arms treaty that year while speaking to reporters, adding that he would see no harm in having the discussion on the treaty begin in January of the following year.

==== 1980 presidential election ====
In July 1979, Senate members Henry M. Jackson from Washington and George McGovern from South Dakota made comments expressing doubt on President Carter being assured as the Democratic nominee in the 1980 presidential election. When asked about their comments by a reporter, Byrd referred to Jackson and McGovern as "two very strong voices and not at all to be considered men who have little background in politics" but stated it was too early to participate in "writing the political obituary of the President at this point". Byrd added that the powers of the presidency made it possible that Carter could have a comeback and cited the events in November and December as being telling of his prospects of achieving higher popularity.

On May 10, 1980, Byrd called for President Carter to debate Senate member Ted Kennedy, who he complimented as having done a service for the US by raising key issues in his presidential campaign. On August 2, Byrd advocated for an open Democratic National Convention where the delegates were not bound to a single candidate. The endorsement was seen as a break from President Carter. In September, Byrd said that Republican presidential nominee Ronald Reagan had made comments on the Iran–Iraq War that were a disservice to the United States and that he was exercising "reckless political posturing" in foreign policy.

=== George H. W. Bush era ===
In early 1990, Byrd proposed an amendment granting special aid to coal miners who would lose their jobs in the event that Congress passed clean air legislation. Byrd was initially confident in the number of votes he needed to secure its passage being made available but this was prevented by a vote from Democrat Joe Biden who said the measure's passage would mean an assured veto by President Bush. Speaking to reporters after its defeat, Byrd stated his content with the results: "I made the supreme effort. I did everything I could and, therefore, I don't feel badly about it". The Senate passed clean air legislation within weeks of the vote on Byrd's amendment with the intent of reduction in acid rain, urban smog and toxic chemicals in the air and meeting the request by President Bush for a measure that was less costly than the initial plan while still performing the same tasks of combating clean air issues. Byrd was one of eleven senators to vote against the bill and said he "cannot vote for legislation that can bring economic ruin to communities throughout the Appalachian region and the Midwest".

In August 1990, after the Senate passed its first major campaign finance reform bill since the Watergate era that would prevent political action committees from federal campaigns, lend public money into congressional campaigns and bestow candidates vouchers for television advertising, Byrd stated that he believed the bill would "end the money chase".

Byrd authored an amendment to the National Endowment for the Arts that would bar the endowment from funding projects considered obscene such as depictions of sadomasochism, homo-eroticism, the sexual exploitation of children, or individuals engaged in sex acts while also requiring grant recipients to sign a pledge swearing their compliance with the restrictions. The October 1990 measure approved in the Senate was a bipartisan measure loosening government restrictions on art project funding and leaving courts to judge what art could be considered obscene.

President Bush nominated Clarence Thomas for the Supreme Court. In October 1991, Byrd stated his support in the credibility of Anita Hill: "I believe what she said. I did not see on that face the knotted brow of satanic revenge. I did not see a face that was contorted with hate. I did not hear a voice that was tremulous with passion. I saw the face of a woman, one of 13 in a family of Southern blacks who grew up on the farm and who belonged to the church". Byrd questioned how members of the Senate could be convinced that Thomas would serve as an objective judge when he could refuse to watch Hill's testimony against him.

In February 1992, the Senate turned down a Republican attempt sponsored by John McCain and Dan Coats to grant President Bush line-item veto authority and thereby be authorized to kill projects that he was opposed to, Byrd delivering an address defending congressional power over spending for eight hours afterward. The speech had been written by Byrd two years prior and he had at this point steered $1.5 billion to his state.

In 1992, there was an effort made to pass a constitutional amendment to ensure a balanced federal budget. Byrd called the amendment "a smokescreen that will allow lawmakers to claim action against the deficit while still postponing hard budgetary decision" and spoke to reporters on his feelings against the amendment being passed: "Once members are really informed as to the mischief this amendment could do, and the damage it could do to the country and to the Constitution. I just have faith that enough members will take a courageous stand against the amendment". The sponsor of the amendment, Paul Simon, admitted that Byrd's prediction was not off and that other senators speak "when the chairman of the Senate Appropriations Committee talks".

In a June 1992 debate, Byrd argued in favor of the United States withdrawing accepting immigrants that did not speak English, the comment being a response to a plan from the Bush administration that would enable former Soviet states to receive American assistance and allow immigrants from a variety of countries to receive welfare benefits. Byrd soon afterward apologized for the comment and said they were due to his frustration over the federal government's inability to afford several essential services.

=== Bill Clinton era ===
In February 1994, the Senate passed a $10 billion spending bill that would mostly be allocated to the 1994 Northridge earthquake victims and military operations abroad. Senate members Bob Dole, John Kerry, John McCain, and Russ Feingold partnered together to persuade the Senate in favor of cutting back the deficit expense. Byrd raised a procedural point to derail an attempt by Dole that would approve $50 billion in spending cuts over the following five years. McCain proposed killing highway demonstration projects with a $203 million price tag, leading Byrd to produce letters written by McCain that the latter had sent to the Appropriations Committee in 1991 in an attempt to gather highway grants for his home state of Arizona. Byrd said that McCain "is very considerate of the taxpayers when it comes to financing projects in other states, but he supports such projects in his own state".

Along with U.S. Senate member Chuck Hagel from Nebraska, in July 1997 Byrd sponsored the Byrd–Hagel Resolution, which effectively prohibited the US from ratifying the Kyoto Protocol on limiting and reducing greenhouse gas emissions.

In May 2000, Byrd and John Warner sponsored a provision threatening to withdraw American troops from Kosovo, the legislation if enacted cutting off funds for troops in Kosovo after July 1, 2001, without congressional consent. The language would have also withheld 25 percent of the money for Kosovo in the bill unless the assertion that European countries were living up to their promises to provide reconstruction money for the province was certified by President Clinton by July 15. Byrd argued that lawmakers had never approved nor debate whether American troops should be stationed in Kosovo. The Senate Appropriations Committee approved the legislation in a vote of 23-to-3 that was said to reflect "widespread concern among lawmakers about an open-ended deployment of American soldiers".

In November 2000, Congress passed an amendment sponsored by Byrd diverting tariff revenues from the United States Department of the Treasury and instead allocating them to the industry complaining, the amount involved ranging from between $40 million and $200 million a year. The following month, Japan and the European Union led a group of countries in filing a joint complaint with the World Trade Organization to the law.

=== George W. Bush era ===
Byrd praised the John G. Roberts Supreme Court nominations to fill the vacancy on the Supreme Court created by the death of Chief Justice William Rehnquist. Likewise, Byrd was one of four Democrats who supported the Samuel Alito Supreme Court nomination to replace retiring Associate Justice Sandra Day O'Connor.

Like most Democrats, Byrd opposed the Bush tax cuts and his proposals to change the Social Security program.

Byrd opposed the Homeland Security Act of 2002, which created the United States Department of Homeland Security, stating that the bill ceded too much authority to the executive branch.

On May 2, 2002, Byrd charged the White House with engaging in "sophomoric political antics", citing Homeland Security Advisor Tom Ridge's briefing of senators in another location instead of the Senate on how safe he felt the U.S. was.

He also led the opposition to Bush's bid to win back the power to negotiate trade deals that Congress cannot amend, but lost overwhelmingly. In the 108th Congress, however, Byrd won his party's top seat on the new Homeland Security Appropriations Subcommittee.

In July 2004, Byrd released the New York Times best-selling book Losing America: Confronting a Reckless and Arrogant Presidency, which criticized the Bush presidency and the war in Iraq.

==== Iraq War ====
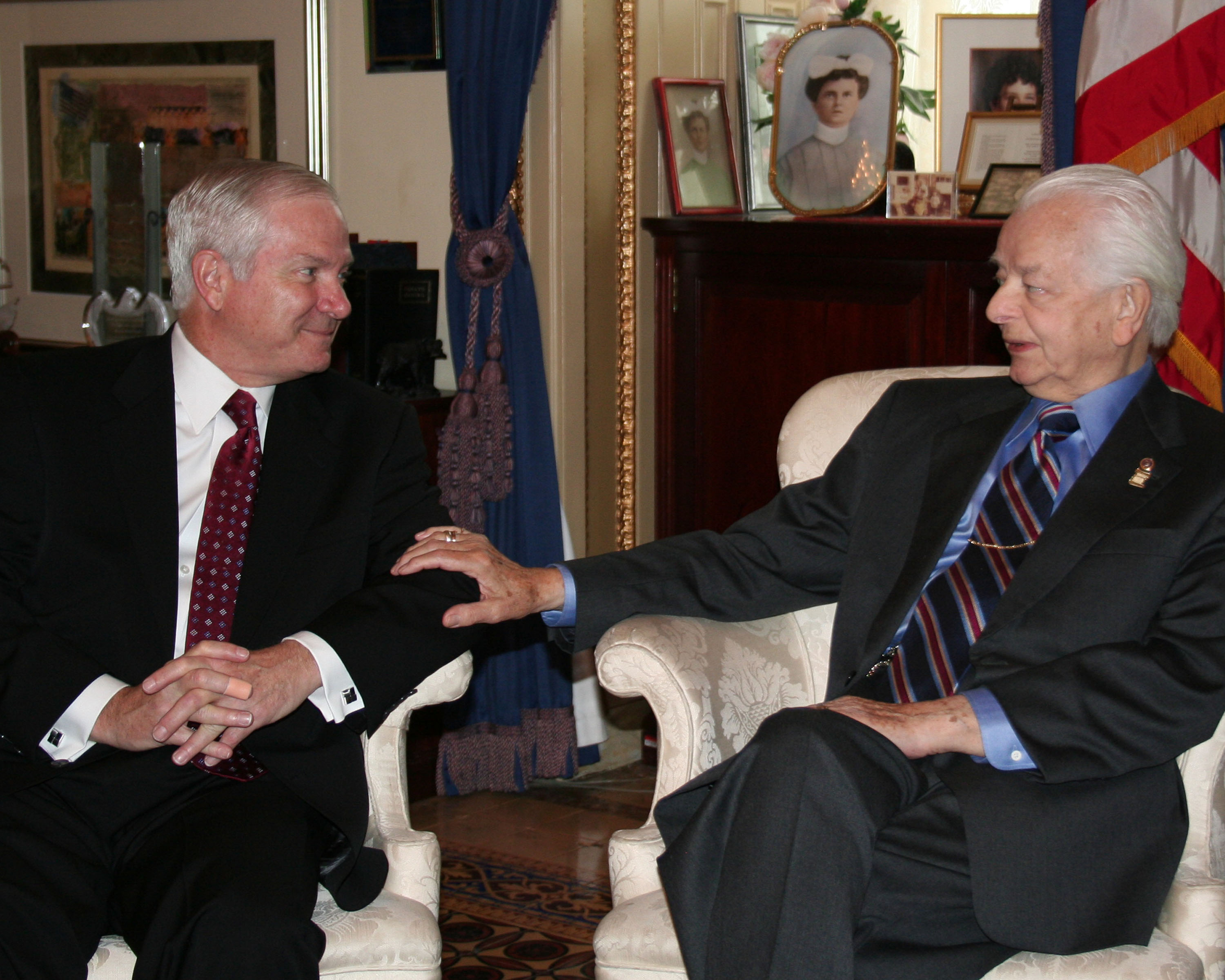
Byrd with Secretary of Defense-designate Robert Gates, November 30, 2006

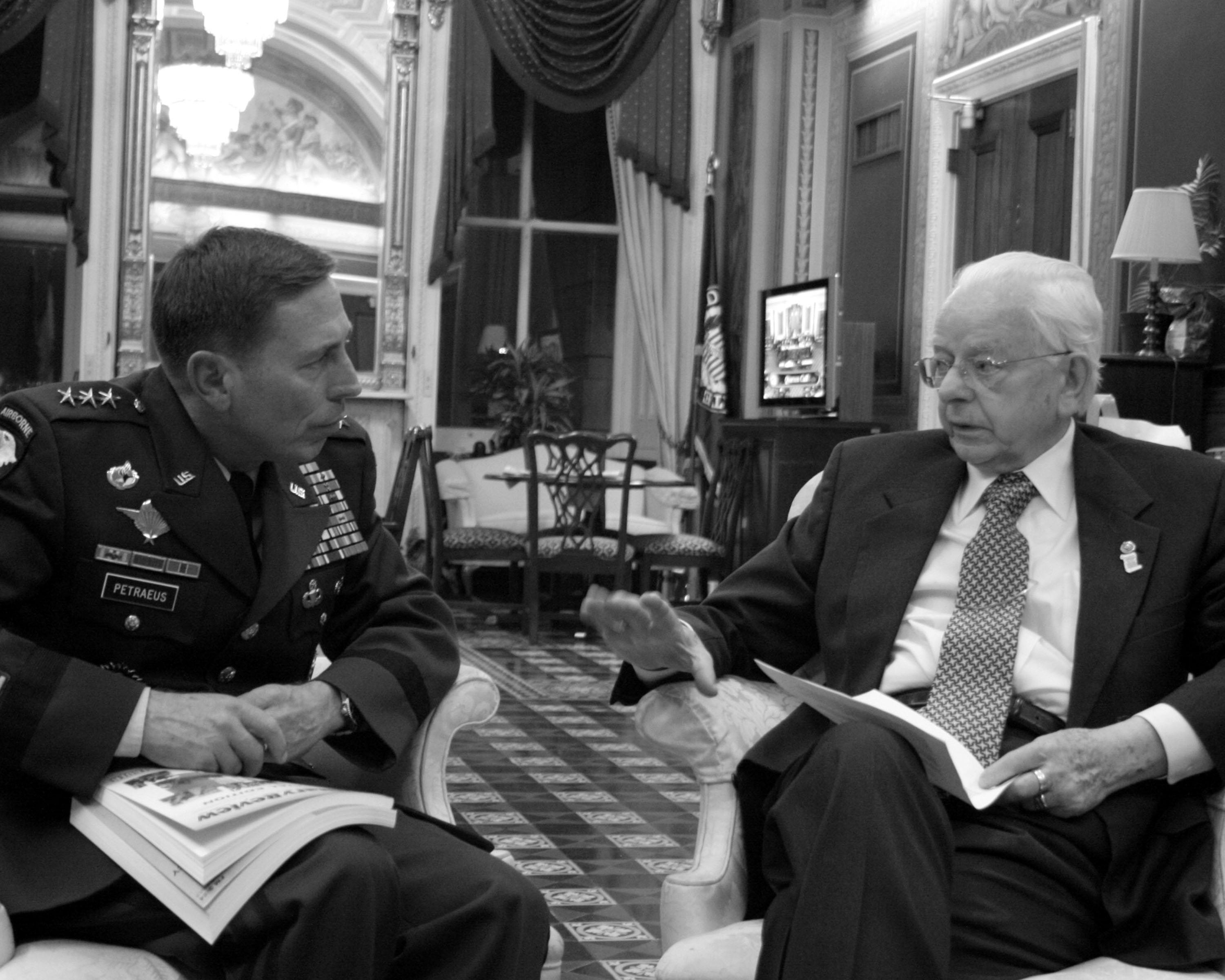
Byrd with Lieutenant General David Petraeus, January 23, 2007

Byrd led a filibuster against the Authorization for Use of Military Force Against Iraq Resolution of 2002 granting President George W. Bush broad power to wage a "preemptive" war against Ba'athist Iraq, but he could not get even a majority of his own party to vote against cloture.

Byrd was one of the Senate's most outspoken critics of the 2003 invasion of Iraq.

Byrd anticipated the difficulty of fighting an insurgency in Iraq, stating on March 13, 2003,

If the United States leads the charge to war in the Persian Gulf, we may get lucky and achieve a rapid victory. But then we will face a second war: a war to win the peace in Iraq. This war will last many years and will surely cost hundreds of billions of dollars. In light of this enormous task, it would be a great mistake to expect that this will be a replay of the 1991 war. The stakes are much higher in this conflict.

On March 19, 2003, when Bush ordered the invasion after receiving congressional approval, Byrd said,

Today I weep for my country. I have watched the events of recent months with a heavy, heavy heart. No more is the image of America one of strong, yet benevolent peacekeeper. The image of America has changed. Around the globe, our friends mistrust us, our word is disputed, our intentions are questioned. Instead of reasoning with those with whom we disagree, we demand obedience or threaten recrimination. Instead of isolating Saddam Hussein, we seem to have succeeded in isolating ourselves.

Byrd also criticized Bush for his speech declaring the "end of major combat operations" in Iraq, which Bush made on the USS Abraham Lincoln. Byrd stated on the Senate floor,

I do not begrudge his salute to America's warriors aboard the carrier Lincoln, for they have performed bravely and skillfully, as have their countrymen still in Iraq. But I do question the motives of a deskbound president who assumes the garb of a warrior for the purposes of a speech.

On October 17, 2003, Byrd delivered a speech expressing his concerns about the future of the nation and his unequivocal antipathy to Bush's policies. Referencing the Hans Christian Andersen children's tale The Emperor's New Clothes, Byrd said of the president: "the emperor has no clothes". Byrd further lamented the "sheep-like" behavior of the "cowed Members of this Senate" and called on them to oppose the continuation of a "war based on falsehoods".

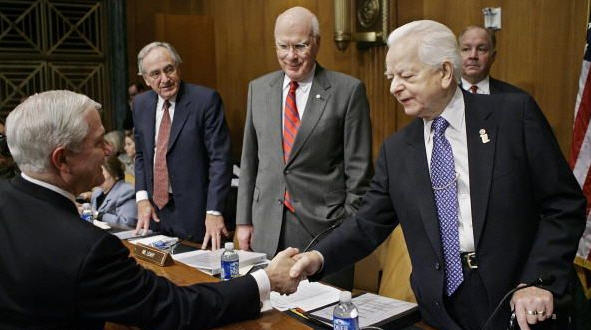
Senator Robert C. Byrd (D-West Virginia, far right) shakes hands with Secretary of Defense Robert Gates, while Sens. Patrick Leahy (D-Vermont, center right) and Tom Harkin (D-Iowa) look on. The hearing was held to discuss further funding for the War in Iraq.

In April 2004, Byrd mentioned the possibility of the Bush administration violating law by its failure to inform leadership in Congress midway through 2002 about its use of emergency anti-terror dollars to begin preparations for an invasion of Iraq. Byrd stated that he had never been told of a shift in money, a charge reported in the Bob Woodward book Plan of Attack, and its validation would mean "the administration failed to abide by the law to consult with and fully inform Congress".

Byrd accused the Bush administration of stifling dissent:

The right to ask questions, debate, and dissent is under attack. The drums of war are beaten ever louder in an attempt to drown out those who speak of our predicament in stark terms. Even in the Senate, our history and tradition of being the world's greatest deliberative body is being snubbed. This huge spending bill—$87 billion—has been rushed through this chamber in just one month. There were just three open hearings by the Senate Appropriations Committee on $87 billion—$87 for every minute since Jesus Christ was born—$87 billion without a single outside witness called to challenge the administration's line.

Of the more than 18,000 votes he cast as a senator, Byrd said he was proudest of his vote against the Iraq war resolution. Byrd also voted to tie a timetable for troop withdrawal to war funding.

==== Gang of 14 ====
On May 23, 2005, Byrd was one of 14 U.S. Senate members (who became known as the "Gang of 14") to forge a compromise on the judicial filibuster, thus securing up and down votes for many judicial nominees and ending the threat of the so-called nuclear option that would have eliminated the filibuster entirely. Under the agreement, the senators retained the power to filibuster a judicial nominee in only an "extraordinary circumstance". It ensured that the appellate court nominees (Janice Rogers Brown, Priscilla Richman and William H Pryor Jr.) would receive votes by the full Senate.

=== Other votes ===
In February 1981, as the Senate voted on giving final approval to the $50 billion increase in the debt limit, Democrats initially opposed the measure as part of an effort to elicit the highest number of Republicans in support of the measure. Byrd proceeded to give a signal for Democrats that saw caucus members switch their votes in support of the increase.

President Reagan was injured during an assassination attempt in March 1981. Following the shooting, Byrd opined that the aftermath of the attempt had proven there were "holes that need to be plugged" in the constitution's handling of the presidential line of succession after a president's disability and stated his intent to introduce legislation calling for a mandatory life sentence for anyone attempting to assassinate a president, vice president, or member of Congress.

In March 1981, during a Capitol Hill interview, Byrd stated that the Reagan administration was promoting an economic package with assumptions for the national economy that might take a year for the public to see its difficulties and thereby lead to a political backlash. Byrd contented that President Reagan would win approval by Congress of $35 to $40 billion of the $48 billion in proposed budget cuts while having more difficulty in passing his tax-cut package, asserting Democratic opposition and some Republicans having misgivings about the approach as the reason Congress would block the plan and furthering that he would be surprised if a one-year cut in rates lasted more than year. Byrd opined that it was time for "some tax reform" that would see loopholes closed for the rich dropped to bring in revenues and expressed belief in the likelihood of the administration dismantling existing energy programs: "Energy programs are not as catchy now as budget cuts. But if the gas lines begin to form again, or the overseas oil gets cut off, we will have lost the time, the momentum, the money. Basically, they have a wholesale dismantlement of the energy programs we spent several years creating around here".

In March 1981, during a news conference, Byrd stated that the Reagan administration had not established a coherent foreign policy. He credited conflicting statements from administration officials with having contributed to confusion in Western European capitals. Byrd also said, "We've seen these statements, and backing and filling, and the secretary of state has been kept pretty busy explaining and denying assertions and pronouncements by others, which indeed indicate that the administration has not yet got its foreign policy act together".

In May 1981, Byrd announced his support for the Reagan administration's proposed budget for the fiscal year 1982 during a weekly news conference, citing that the "people want the President to be given a chance with his budget". Byrd added that he did not believe a balanced budget would be achieved by 1984, calling the budget "a balanced budget on paper only, made up of juggled figures produced out of thin air", and charged the administration with making assumptions, his comments being seen as an indication that little opposition would amount from the Democrats to the Reagan budget.

In November 1981, as Senate leaders rejected the request of Senate member Harrison A. Williams from New Jersey to introduce new evidence during the Senate's consideration of whether to expel him for his involvement in the Abscam case, Byrd and Majority Leader Baker informed Williams that he could have a lawyer that would have to remain wordless.

On December 2, 1981, Byrd voted in favor of an amendment to President Reagan's MX missiles proposal that would divert the silo system by $334 million as well as earmark further research for other methods that would allow giant missiles to be based. The vote was seen as a rebuff of the Reagan administration.

In February 1982, Byrd wrote a letter to President Reagan urging him to "withdraw the Administration's proposed fiscal 1983 budget, and resubmit a budget that provides for much lower deficits and makes use of more realistic assumptions", recalling his previous appeal to President Carter in 1980 amid the rise of soaring inflation rates and Carter afterward consulting with Democrats in Congress. Byrd stated that he was in favor of "a document we in Congress can work with, one based on realistic assumptions, one which shows a much clearer trend toward a balanced budget". Byrd had cautious praise for a proposal by Democrat Fritz Hollings called for a freeze on all benefit programs with the exception of food stamps, Medicare and Medicaid in addition to a freeze on military spending while eliminating a pay increase for federal employees.

In March 1982, Byrd announced he would introduce an amendment to the War Powers Act that would bar the president from being able to send combat troops to the Salvadoran Civil War without the approval of Congress. Byrd described the proposal as only allowing the president to act with independence in the event that Americans needed to evacuate El Salvador or if the United States was attacked. "It is my view that if Americans are to be asked to shed their blood in the jungles of El Salvador, all Americans should first have an opportunity to debate and carefully evaluate that action".

By March 1982, along with Alan Cranston, Byrd was one of two U.S. Senate members supporting both the measure sponsored by Henry M. Jackson and John Warner calling upon the United States and the Soviet Union to freeze their nuclear arsenals at "equal and sharply reduced levels" and the bill sponsored by Ted Kennedy and Mark Hatfield calling upon the two countries first to negotiate a freeze on nuclear forces at existing levels before following atomic arms reduction.

In January 1983, after President Reagan said during his 1983 State of the Union Address that he hoped for the same bipartisan support that had produced the Social Security recommendations would lead Congress during the year on other issues, Byrd and House Majority Leader Jim Wright assailed the unfairness of a six-month delay in the cost-of-living increases for Social Security recipients during a period of letting the wealthy reap the benefits of the general income tax cut for a third year. Byrd stated that he did not "want a six-month delay in Social Security while leaving in place the third year of the tax cut for upper-income people" and stated that Reagan's speech had been "'rhetorically good, but substantively lacking in measures that would deal now with the crises that millions of people are experiencing".

At the beginning of February 1983, House Democrats committed themselves "to an emergency economic assistance program that would create public service jobs, provide shelter and soup kitchens for the destitute and avert foreclosures of homes and farms". Concurrently, Byrd pledged to work with the House Democrats in developing legislation concerning jobs, proposing $5 to $10 billion be spent and introducing legislation intended to form a national investment corporation that would assist with underwriting faltering basic industries and starting new ones in areas of high unemployment.

In March 1984, Byrd voted against a proposed constitutional amendment authorizing periods in public school for silent prayer, and in favor of President Reagan's unsuccessful proposal for a constitutional amendment permitting organized school prayer in public schools.

In June 1984, Byrd was one of five Democrats to vote against the Lawton Chiles proposal to cease MX production for a year during study in search of a smaller and single-warhead missile. The 48 to 48 tie was broken by then-Vice President George H. W. Bush.

In September 1986, Byrd endorsed the death penalty for some drug pushers in anti-drug legislation that would order President Reagan to end drug trafficking within 45 days through using the military as a means of intercepting smugglers, and imposing the death penalty on those pushers who intentionally cause a death as part of their operations while providing funding for prevention, drug abuse treatment, and anti-drug laws enforcement that was estimated to cost $3 to $4 billion over three years. Byrd admitted that calling for the death penalty seemed harsh, but cautioned that children in some cases had their entire lives destroyed through using drugs and that Congress had been soft for too long without seeing a change in results.

In December 1986, Byrd announced that the Senate would convene a Watergate-type select committee to investigate the Iran-Contra affair the following year and that he had reached an agreement with Bob Dole for the committee to have six Democrats and five Republicans. Byrd and Dole disagreed on whether it was a necessity for Congress to be launched into a special session that month for the purpose of getting the investigative process moving. Naming members during December enabled participants to informally move ahead by selecting the staff and be prepared before the 100th United States Congress began.

In September 1988, in response to charges by Vice President Bush's presidential campaign that Democratic nominee Michael Dukakis was weak on defense, Byrd delivered a Senate speech in which he said that the Reagan administration "is living in a glass house when it throws a stone at the Democratic Party for its so-called Disneyland defense policies" and that the U.S. land-based missiles had grown in vulnerability due to the administration being "unable to produce an acceptable solution to make our missiles survivable". Byrd furthered, "Indeed, the Fantasyland exhibits of this White House's Defense Disneyland are loaded with the rejected systems that have been developed and discarded. If anything deserves the names 'Goofy' and 'Daffy' and 'Mickey Mouse,' it is those' basing proposals".

In October 1990, Byrd and U.S. Senate member Jim McClure from Idaho served as floor managers for the appropriation bill for the National Endowment of the Arts, accepting an amendment by U.S. Senate member Jesse Helms from North Carolina prohibiting NEA support of work denigrating objects or beliefs of religions.

In November 1993, when the Senate voted to seek federal court enforcement of a subpoena for the diaries of Bob Packwood, Byrd stated the possibility of Americans becoming convinced that the Senate was delaying taking action to protect one of its own members. Byrd also called for Packwood to resign. "None of us is without flaws. But when those flaws damage the institution of the Senate, it is time to have the grace to go!" Packwood resigned in 1995.

In October 1999, Byrd was the only senator to vote present on the Comprehensive Nuclear-Test-Ban Treaty. The treaty was designed to ban underground nuclear testing and was the first major international security pact to be defeated in the Senate since the Treaty of Versailles.

Byrd opposed the Flag Desecration Amendment, saying that, while he wanted to protect the American flag, he believed that amending the Constitution "is not the most expeditious way to protect this revered symbol of our Republic". As an alternative, Byrd cosponsored the Flag Protection Act of 2005 (S. 1370), a bill to prohibit destruction or desecration of the flag by anyone trying to incite violence or causing a breach of the peace, or who steals, damages, or destroys a flag on federal property, whether owned by the federal government or a private group or individual—can be imprisoned, fined or both. The bill did not pass.

In 2009, Byrd was one of three Democrats to oppose the confirmation of United States Secretary of the Treasury Timothy Geithner. After missing nearly two months while in hospital, Byrd returned to the Senate floor on July 21 to vote against the elimination of funding for the F-22 fighter plane.

=== Ratings groups ===
Byrd received a 65% vote rating from the League of Conservation Voters for his support of environmentally friendly legislation. Additionally, he received a "liberal" rating of 65.5% by the National Journal—higher than six other Democratic senators.

In 2010, Byrd received a 70 percent lifetime rating from the American Civil Liberties Union for supporting rights-related legislation.

== Health issues and death ==
Byrd had an essential tremor; he eventually used a wheelchair for mobility. His health declined through 2008, including several hospital admissions. The New Yorker reported in 2020 that Byrd was "widely known" to be non compos mentis during the final years of his career.

On January 20, 2009, U.S. Senate member Ted Kennedy suffered a seizure during Barack Obama's inaugural luncheon and was taken away in an ambulance. Byrd, seated at the same table, became distraught and was himself removed to his office. Byrd's office reported that he was fine. On May 18, Byrd was admitted to the hospital after experiencing a fever due to a "minor infection", prolonged by a staphylococcus aureus infection. Byrd was released on June 30, 2009.

On June 27, 2010, it was reported that Byrd had been admitted to Inova Fairfax Hospital in Fairfax County, Virginia, earlier that weekend; while he was first admitted for suspected heat exhaustion, "more serious issues" emerged and he was said to be "seriously ill". He died at approximately 3 a.m. EDT the next day at age 92 from natural causes. At the time of his death in office, he was the last living U.S. senator who assumed office in the 1950s, and the last living U.S. senator who served during the Presidency of Dwight D. Eisenhower.

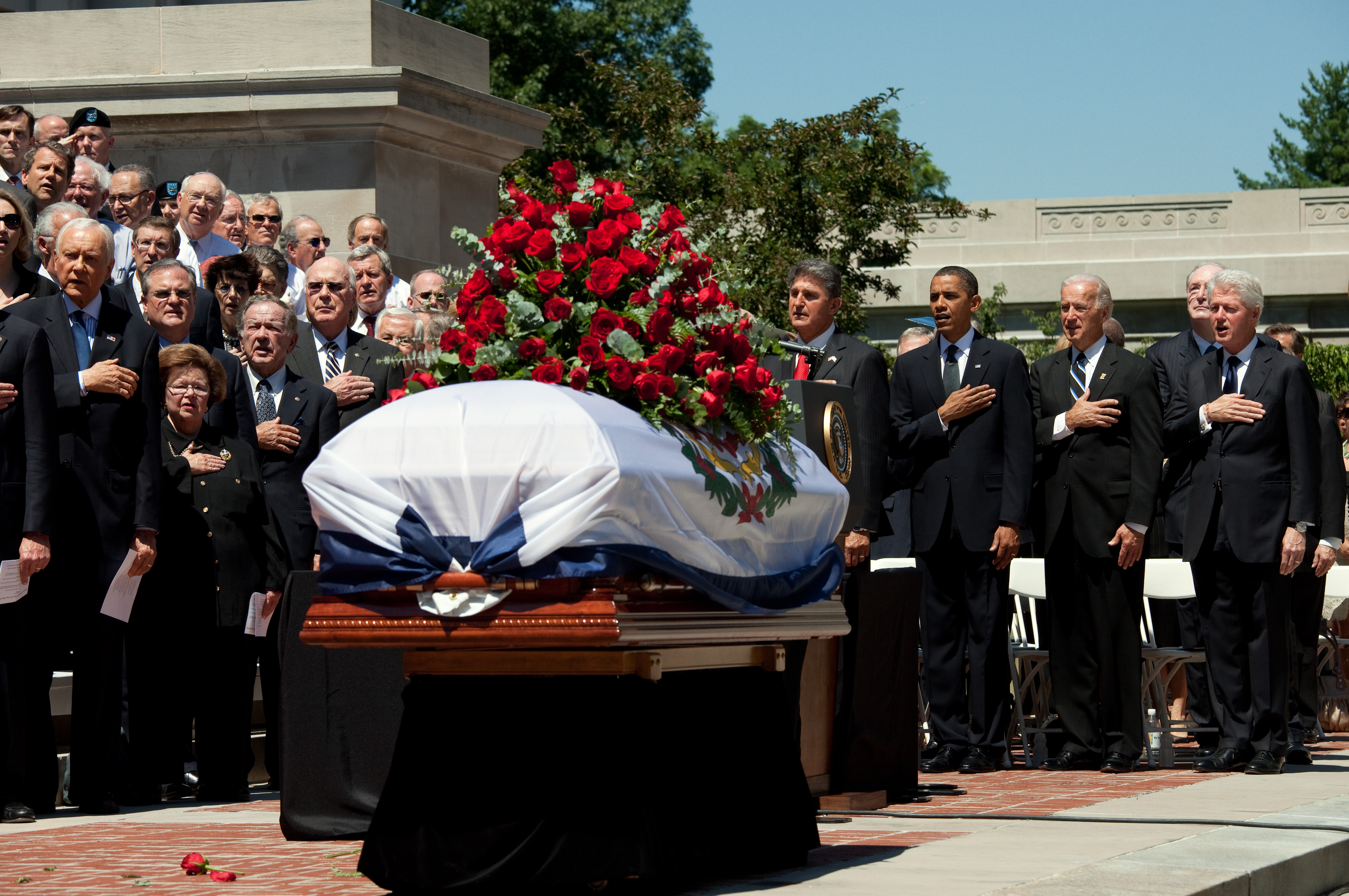
United States President Barack Obama, Vice President Joe Biden, former President Bill Clinton, West Virginia Governor Joe Manchin and members of Congress attended the memorial service for Byrd at the State Capitol in Charleston, West Virginia, on July 2, 2010.

Vice President and former U.S. Senate member Joe Biden of Delaware recalled Byrd's standing in the rain with him as Biden buried his daughter when Biden had just been elected to the Senate. He called Byrd "a tough, compassionate, and outspoken leader and dedicated above all else to making life better for the people of the Mountain State". President of the United States and former U.S. Senate member Barack Obama from Illinois said, "His profound passion for that body and its role and responsibilities was as evident behind closed doors as it was in the stemwinders he peppered with history. He held the deepest respect of members of both parties, and he was generous with his time and advice, something I appreciated greatly as a young senator". Senator Jay Rockefeller, who had served with Byrd since 1985, said, "I looked up to him, I fought next to him, and I am deeply saddened that he is gone". Former president Jimmy Carter noted, "He was my closest and most valuable adviser while I served as president. I respected him and attempted in every way to remain in his good graces. He was a giant among legislators, and was courageous in espousing controversial issues".

On July 1, 2010, Byrd lay in repose on the Lincoln Catafalque in the Senate chamber of the United States Capitol, becoming the first senator to do so since 1957. He was then flown to Charleston, West Virginia, where he lay in repose in the Lower Rotunda of the West Virginia State Capitol.

A funeral was held on July 2, 2010, on the grounds of the State Capitol where Byrd was eulogized by President Barack Obama, Vice President Joe Biden, Governor Joe Manchin, U.S. Senate Majority Leader Harry Reid, U.S. Senate Minority Leader Mitch McConnell, Speaker of the U.S. House of Representatives Nancy Pelosi, U.S. Senate member Jay Rockefeller, U.S. House of Representatives member Nick Rahall, Victoria Reggie Kennedy, and former president Bill Clinton. After the funeral services in Charleston, his body was returned to Arlington County, Virginia, for funeral services on July 6, 2010, at Memorial Baptist Church. After the funeral in Arlington, Byrd was buried next to his wife Erma at Columbia Gardens Cemetery in Arlington, although family members have stated that both the senator and Mrs. Byrd will be reinterred somewhere in West Virginia once a site is determined.

The song "Take Me Home, Country Roads" was played at the end of the funeral in a bluegrass fashion as his casket was being carried back up the stairs and into the West Virginia State Capitol Building.

On September 30, 2010, Congress appropriated $193,400 to be paid equally among Byrd's children and grandchildren, representing the salary he would have earned in the next fiscal year, a common practice when members of Congress die in office.

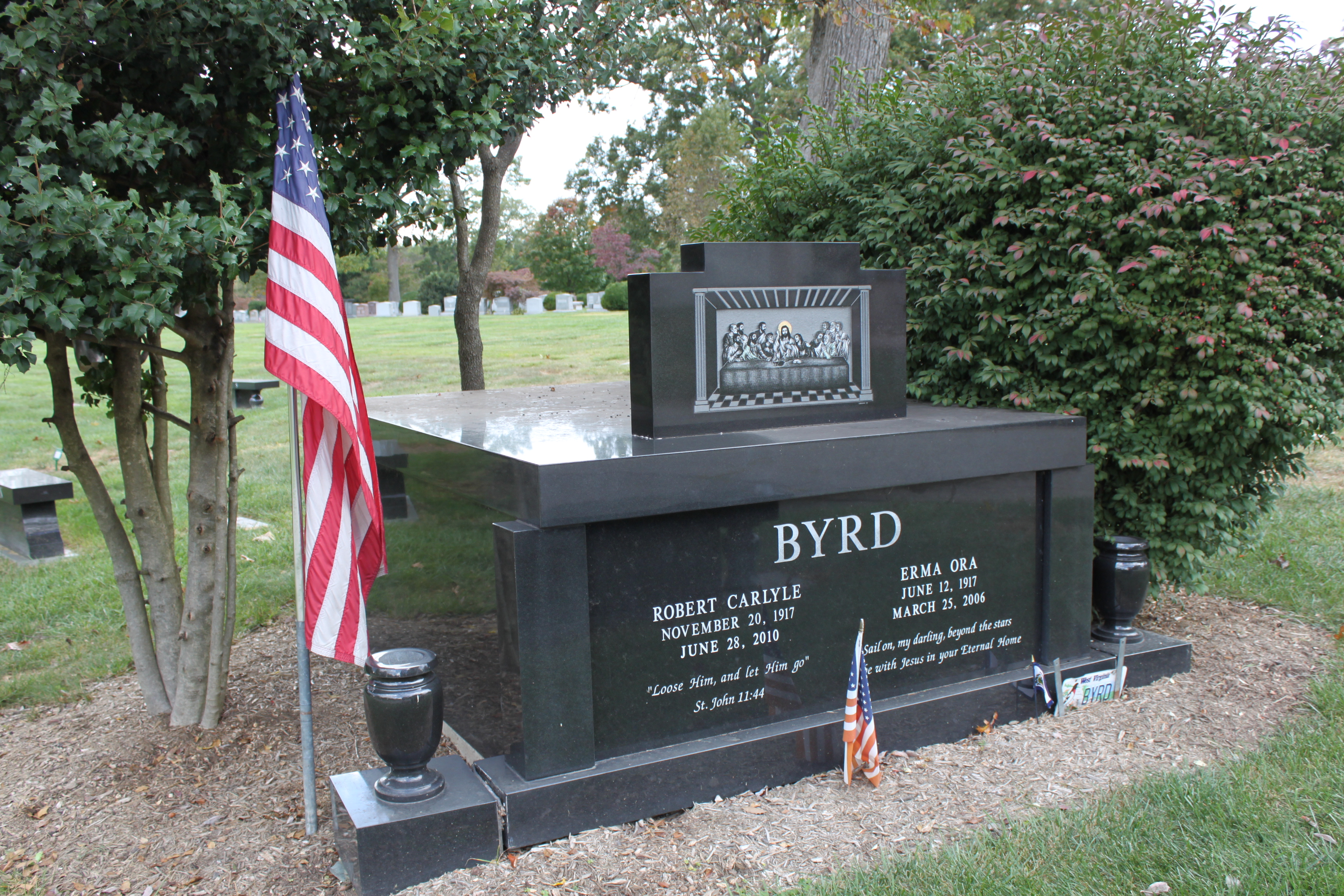
Grave of Byrd and his wife, Erma

=== Reaction to death ===
Multiple political figures issued statements following Byrd's death:

- Secretary of State Hillary Clinton: "It is almost impossible to imagine the United States Senate without Robert Byrd. He was not just its longest-serving member, he was its heart and soul. From my first day in the Senate, I sought out his guidance, and he was always generous with his time and his wisdom".
- Vice President (and thus President of the Senate) Joe Biden: "A very close friend of mine, one of my mentors, a guy who was there when I was a 29-year-old kid being sworn into the United States Senate. Shortly thereafter, a guy who stood in the rain, in the pouring rain, freezing rain outside a church as I buried my daughter and my wife before I got sworn in … We lost the dean of the United States Senate, but also the state of West Virginia lost its most fierce advocate and, as I said, I lost a dear friend".
- Democratic Senator Chris Dodd: "He [Robert Byrd] never stopped growing as a public official, and was a man who learned from his mistakes. He was more than a friend and colleague. He was a mentor to me and literally hundreds of legislators with whom he served over the past five decades".
- Republican Senator Lindsey Graham: "Senator Byrd was a valuable ally and worthy opponent. He will be viewed by history as one of the giants of the Senate".
- Republican Senator Orrin Hatch: "On the issues, we were frequent opponents, but he was always gracious both in victory and defeat. This is a man who earned his law degree while serving in the Senate, and who had a prodigious knowledge of ancient and modern history".
- President Barack Obama: "He [Robert Byrd] was as much a part of the Senate as the marble busts that line its chamber and its corridors. His profound passion for that body and its role and responsibilities was as evident behind closed doors as it was in the stemwinders he peppered with history. He held the deepest respect of members of both parties, and he was generous with his time and advice, something I appreciated greatly as a young senator".
- Senate Republican leader Mitch McConnell: "Senator Byrd combined a devotion to the U.S. Constitution with a deep learning of history to defend the interests of his state and the traditions of the Senate. We will remember him for his fighter's spirit, his abiding faith, and for the many times he recalled the Senate to its purposes".
- House Speaker Nancy Pelosi: "Throughout his historic career in the House and Senate, he never stopped working to improve the lives of the people of West Virginia. While some simply bore witness to history, Senator Byrd shaped it and strove to build a brighter future for us all".
- Fellow Democratic senator from West Virginia Jay Rockefeller: "Senator Byrd came from humble beginnings in the southern coalfields, was raised by hard-working West Virginians, and triumphantly rose to the heights of power in America. But he never forgot where he came from nor who he represented, and he never abused that power for his own gain".

== In popular culture ==
Byrd had a prominent role in the 2008 Warner Bros. documentary Body of War directed by Phil Donahue. The film chronicles the life of Tomas Young, paralyzed from the chest down after a sniper shot him as he was riding in a vehicle in Iraq. Several long clips of Byrd show him passionately arguing against authorizing the use of force in Iraq. Later in the movie, Byrd has a one-on-one interview with Tomas Young in Byrd's Senate office, followed by a shot of Byrd walking beside Young as they leave the Capitol.

A fictionalized version of Byrd, then the Senate Majority Leader, was a character in the Jeffrey Archer novel Shall We Tell the President?

Byrd was an avid fiddle player for most of his life, starting in his teens when he played in various square dance bands. Once he entered politics, his fiddling skills attracted attention and won votes. In 1978 when Byrd was majority leader, he recorded an album called U.S. Senator Robert Byrd: Mountain Fiddler (County, 1978). Byrd was accompanied by Country Gentlemen Doyle Lawson, James Bailey, and Spider Gilliam. Most of the LP consists of bluegrass music. Byrd covers "Don't Let Your Sweet Love Die", a Zeke Manners song, and "Will the Circle Be Unbroken". He had performed at the Kennedy Center, on the Grand Ole Opry and on Hee Haw. He occasionally took a break from Senate business to entertain audiences with his fiddle. He stopped playing in 1982 when the symptoms of a benign essential tremor had begun to affect the use of his hands.

Byrd appeared in the Civil War movie Gods and Generals in 2003 along with then-Virginia senator George Allen. Both played Confederate States officers.

== Published writing ==
=== Books ===
- 1989. The Senate, 1789–1989, Vol. 1: Addresses on the History of the United States Senate. ISBN 0-16-006391-4.
- 1991. The Senate, 1789–1989, Vol. 2: Addresses on the History of the United States Senate. ISBN 0-16-006405-8.
- 1993. The Senate, 1789–1989: Historical Statistics, 1789–1992, Vol. 4. ISBN 0-16-063256-0.
- 1995. The Senate, 1789–1989: Classic Speeches, 1830–1993, Vol. 3. ISBN 0-16-063257-9.
- 1995. Senate of the Roman Republic: Addresses on the History of Roman Constitutionalism. ISBN 0-16-058996-7.
- 2004. Losing America: Confronting a Reckless and Arrogant Presidency. ISBN 0-393-05942-1.
- 2004. We Stand Passively Mute: Senator Robert C. Byrd's Iraq Speeches. ISBN 0-9755749-0-6.
- 2005. Robert C. Byrd: Child of the Appalachian Coalfields. ISBN 1-933202-00-9.
- 2008. Letter to a New President: Commonsense Lessons for Our Next Leader. ISBN 0-312-38302-9.

=== Articles ===
- Byrd, Robert (Spring 1966). "The Case Against Home Rule". Legal Issue: 6–8.
- Byrd, Robert (November 1966). "The Right to Assembly versus the Right of Privacy". Student Lawyer Journal. 12 (2): 5–24.
- Byrd, Robert (November 1966). "Turning a Corner in Juvenile Corrections". Federal Probation. 30 (14): 14–24.
- Byrd, Robert (March 1967). "District of Columbia Home Rule". American University Law Review. 16 (2): 254–270.
- Byrd, Robert (1980). "Coal Utilization by Electric Utilities - The Costs of Conversion". St. Mary's Law Journal. 11 (3): 603–608.
- Byrd, Robert (Spring 1988). "The Future of the Coal Industry and the Role of the Legal Profession". West Virginia Law Review. 90 (3): 727–730.
- Byrd, Robert (Spring 1991). "The Clean Air Act Amendments of 1990: An Innovative, but Uncertain Approach to Acid Rain Control". West Virginia Law Review. 93 (3): 477–496.
- Byrd, Robert (Spring 1995). "The Constitution, the Congress, and the Use of Military Force". Brown Journal of World Affairs. 2 (2): 37–40.
- Byrd, Robert (Winter 1998). "The Constitution in Peril". West Virginia Law Review. 101 (2): 385–406.
- Byrd, Robert (Summer 1998). "The Control of the Purse and the Line Item Veto Act" (PDF). Harvard Journal on Legislation. 35 (2): 297–334.

== Robert C. Byrd Center for Congressional History and Education ==
In 2002, the Robert C. Byrd Center for Legislative Studies ("the center" or "the Byrd Center") was opened on the campus of Shepherd University, in Shepherdstown, West Virginia, adjoining the university's Ruth Scarborough Library. The Byrd Center's mission is "advancing representative democracy and promoting a better understanding of the United States Congress and the Constitution through programs and research that engage citizens." The Byrd Center is an archival research facility, housing the papers of Senator Robert C. Byrd in addition to the papers of Congressmen Harley O. Staggers Sr. and Harley O. Staggers Jr. and Scot Faulkner, the first Chief Administrative Officer of the United States House of Representatives. The Byrd Center is a founding institution of the Association of Centers for the Study of Congress, "an independent alliance of organizations and institutions which promote the study of the U.S. Congress".

In 2016, the center was renamed to the Robert C. Byrd Center for Congressional History and Education. (Note: According to the Byrd Center, the "new name reflects a sharpening of our mission and a recognition of what we have accomplished since the Center opened in 2002.")

== See also ==
- Byrd Rule
- Ku Klux Klan members in United States politics
- List of places named after Robert Byrd
- List of members of the United States Congress by longevity of service
- List of members of the United States Congress who died in office (2000–present)#2010s
- Richard Nixon Supreme Court candidates

== Endnotes ==
U.S. House of Representatives
Preceded by Erland Hedrick	Member of the U.S. House of Representatives from West Virginia's 6th congressional district 1953–1959	Succeeded by John Slack
Party political offices
Preceded by William Marland	Democratic nominee for U.S. Senator from West Virginia (Class 1); 1958, 1964, 1970, 1976, 1982, 1988, 1994, 2000, 2006	Succeeded by Joe Manchin
Preceded by George Smathers	Secretary of the Senate Democratic Conference; 1967–1971	Succeeded by Ted Moss
Preceded by Ted Kennedy	Senate Democratic Whip; 1971–1977	Succeeded by Alan Cranston
Preceded by Mike Mansfield	Senate Democratic Leader; 1977–1989	Succeeded by George Mitchell
Vacant Title last held by Ted Stevens; John Rhodes	Response to the State of the Union address 1982, 1983, 1984; Served alongside: Alan Cranston, Al Gore, Gary Hart, Bennett Johnston, Ted Kennedy, Tip O'Neill, Don Riegle, Paul Sarbanes, Jim Sasser (1982), Les AuCoin, Joe Biden, Bill Bradley, Tom Daschle, Bill Hefner, Barbara B. Kennelly, George Miller, Tip O'Neill, Paul Simon, Paul Tsongas, Tim Wirth (1983), Max Baucus, Joe Biden, David Boren, Barbara Boxer, Dante Fascell, Bill Gray, Tom Harkin, Dee Huddleston, Carl Levin, Tip O'Neill, Claiborne Pell (1984)	Succeeded by Bill Clinton; Bob Graham; Tip O'Neill
Preceded by Tom Daschle, Bill Gray, George Mitchell, Chuck Robb, Harriett Woods	Response to the State of the Union address 1987, 1988; Served alongside: Jim Wright	Succeeded by Lloyd Bentsen; Jim Wright
U.S. Senate
Preceded by Chapman Revercomb	U.S. Senator (Class 1) from West Virginia; 1959–2010; Served alongside: Jennings Randolph, Jay Rockefeller	Succeeded by Carte Goodwin
Preceded by Ted Kennedy	Senate Majority Whip; 1971–1977	Succeeded by Alan Cranston
Preceded by Mike Mansfield	Senate Majority Leader; 1977–1981	Succeeded by Howard Baker
Preceded by Howard Baker	Senate Minority Leader; 1981–1987	Succeeded by Bob Dole
Preceded by Bob Dole	Senate Majority Leader; 1987–1989	Succeeded by George J. Mitchell
Preceded by John Stennis	Chair of the Senate Appropriations Committee; 1989–1995	Succeeded by Mark Hatfield
Preceded by Ted Stevens	Chair of the Senate Appropriations Committee; 2001–2003	Succeeded by Ted Stevens
Preceded by Thad Cochran	Chair of the Senate Appropriations Committee; 2007–2009	Succeeded by Daniel Inouye
Political offices
Preceded by John Stennis	President pro tempore of the U.S. Senate; 1989–1995	Succeeded by Strom Thurmond
Preceded by Strom Thurmond	President pro tempore of the U.S. Senate; 2001	Succeeded by Strom Thurmond
Preceded by Strom Thurmond	President pro tempore of the U.S. Senate; 2001–2003	Succeeded by Ted Stevens
Preceded by Ted Stevens	President pro tempore of the U.S. Senate; 2007–2010	Succeeded by Daniel Inouye
Honorary titles
Preceded by John Stennis	Most senior Democratic senator 1989–2010	Succeeded by Daniel Inouye
Preceded by Strom Thurmond	Dean of the U.S. Senate; 2003–2010	Succeeded by Daniel Inouye
Preceded by Strom Thurmond	President pro tempore emeritus of the U.S. Senate; 2003–2007	Succeeded by Ted Stevens
Preceded by Gerald Ford	Persons who have lain in state or honor in the United States Capitol; 2010	Succeeded by Daniel Inouye
Preceded by Strom Thurmond	Oldest United States Senator; 2003–2010	Succeeded by Frank Lautenberg
Preceded by George Smathers	Most senior living U.S. senator (Sitting or former); 2007–2010	Succeeded by Daniel Inouye
