= 1970 United States Senate election in West Virginia =

- November 3, 1970
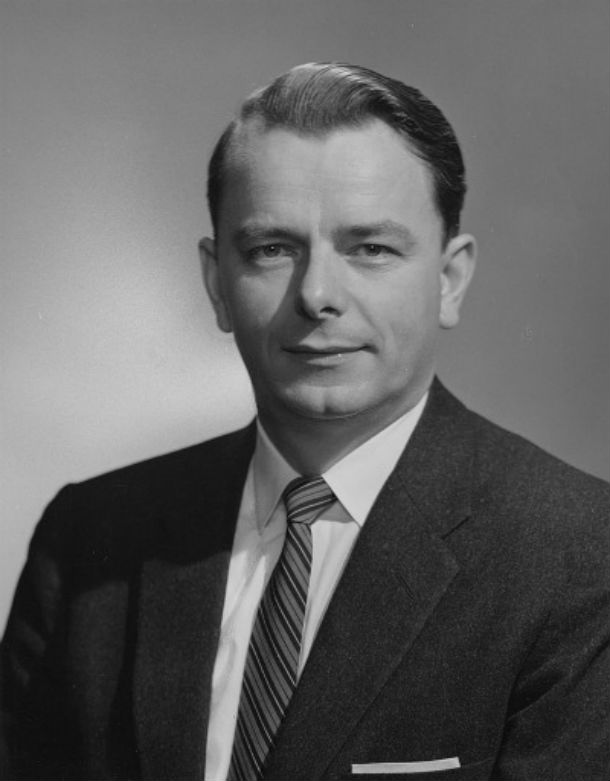

| Nominee | Robert Byrd | Elmer Dodson |
| Party | Democratic | Republican |
| Popular vote | 345,965 | 99,658 |
| Percentage | 77.64% | 22.36% |
- County results Byrd: 60–70% 70–80% 80–90%
U.S. senator before election
Robert Byrd
Democratic
Elected U.S. Senator
Robert Byrd
Democratic

The 1970 United States Senate election in West Virginia was held on November 3, 1970. Incumbent senator Robert Byrd won re-election by the biggest margin at that point in his career.

== Background ==
The election was held during the 1970 United States Senate elections. In the election Democrats maintained their majority, but lost seats.

== Results ==
=== Democratic primary ===
1970 West Virginia United States Senate Democratic Primary
| Party | Candidate | Votes | % | ±% |
|---|---|---|---|---|
| Democratic | Robert Byrd (incumbent) | 391,450 | 88.96% | N/A |
| Democratic | John J. McOwen | 24,286 | 11.04% | N/A |

=== General Election ===
1970 West Virginia United States Senate General Election
| Party | Candidate | Votes | % | ±% |
|---|---|---|---|---|
| Democratic | Robert Byrd (incumbent) | 345,965 | 77.64% | +9.97% |
| Republican | Elmer Dodson | 99,658 | 22.36% | −9.97% |
