= 1976 United States Senate election in West Virginia =

- November 2, 1976
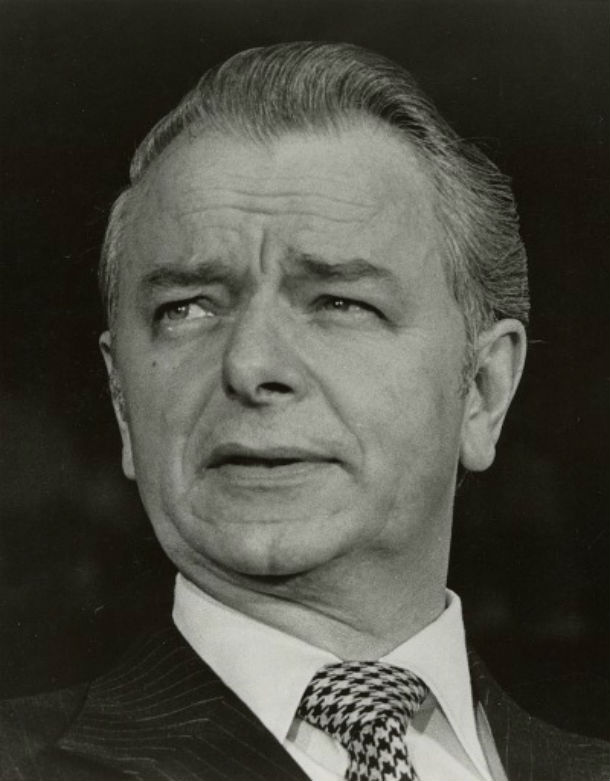
Nominee	Robert Byrd
Party	Democratic
Popular vote	566,359
Percentage	100.00%
- County results Byrd: 100%
U.S. senator before election
Robert Byrd
Democratic
Elected U.S. Senator
Robert Byrd
Democratic

The 1976 United States Senate election in West Virginia was held on November 2, 1976. Incumbent Democratic U.S. Senator Robert Byrd won re-election to a fourth term. The Republican Party did not field a candidate for this election, leading to a 100% election victory for Byrd. Byrd's 566,359 votes is the most received by a Democrat in any statewide election in the state's history.

== Democratic primary ==
=== Candidate ===
- Robert Byrd, incumbent U.S. senator

=== Results ===
Democratic Party primary results
Party	Candidate	Votes	%
Democratic	Robert Byrd (incumbent)	345,227	100.00%
Total votes		345,227	100.00%

== General election ==
=== Result ===
United States Senate election in West Virginia, 1976
Party	Candidate	Votes	%
Democratic	Robert Byrd (incumbent)	566,359	100.00%
Total votes		566,359	100.00%
Democratic hold			

==== By county ====
County	Robert Byrd Democratic		Margin		Total
County	Monongalia				Total
Preston
Totals	566,359	100.00%	566,359	100.00%	566,359

== See also ==
- 1976 United States Senate elections
