= 1964 United States Senate election in West Virginia =

- November 3, 1964
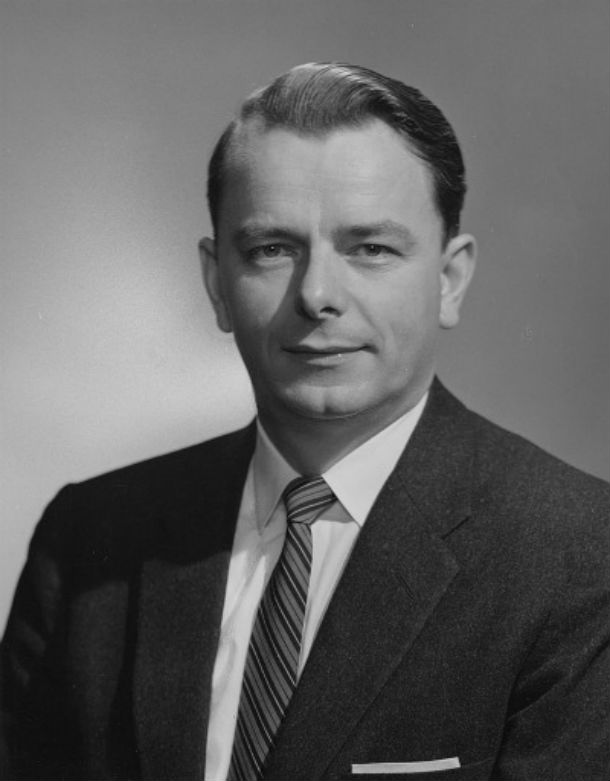

Nominee	Robert Byrd	Cooper P. Benedict
Party	Democratic	Republican
Popular vote	515,015	246,072
Percentage	67.67%	32.33%
- County results Byrd: 50–60% 60–70% 70–80% 80–90% Benedict: 50–60% 60–70%
U.S. senator before election
Robert Byrd
Democratic
Elected U.S. Senator
Robert Byrd
Democratic

The 1964 United States Senate election in West Virginia was held on November 3, 1964, alongside the 1964 United States presidential election. Incumbent Senator Robert Byrd won re-election in a landslide.

== Background ==
Incumbent Senator Robert Byrd ran for a second term in this election. President Lyndon B. Johnson also ran for re-election. Johnson won West Virginia by a very large margin. Johnson was also re-elected President of the United States in 1964. Democrats also gained two seats in the Senate in the 1964 United States Senate elections.

== Results ==
1964 West Virginia United States Senate General Election
Party	Candidate	Votes	%	±%
Democratic	Robert Byrd (incumbent)	515,015	67.67%	+8.48%
Republican	Cooper P. Benedict	246,072	32.33%	−8.48%
