= Barn theatre (disambiguation) =

A Barn theatre is a summer theatrical scene in a barn.

Barn theatre or Barn Theatre may also refer to:

- Barn theatres in Lithuania, tradition to stage performances and concerts in barns in Lithuania, United States
- The Barn Theatre, Augusta, Michigan, United States
- Barn Theatre, Welwyn Garden City, barn converted into a theatre, Hertfordshire, England
