= Barn house =

Barn house, Barnhouse or Barn House may refer to:

- a converted barn, an old barn remodeled for another use.
- a historical house type of a combined house and barn called a byre-dwelling or housebarn
- Barnhouse Settlement, an archaeological site in Scotland
- Barn House, a historic district in Massachusetts, US
- Barnhouse, a surname; notable people with the name include:
  - Charles Lloyd Barnhouse (1865–1929), American music publisher
  - Donald Barnhouse (1895–1960), American preacher and writer

== See also ==
- Barnhouse Effect
