= Barn, Phagwara =

Barn
- Village
- Location in Punjab, India Barn (India)
- Coordinates: 31.275905°N 75.757499°E
- Country: India
- State: Punjab
- District: Kapurthala

Government
  - Type: Panchayati raj (India)
  - Body: Gram panchayat

Population (2011)
  - Total: 1,106
- Sex ratio 553/553♂/♀

Languages
  - Official: Punjabi
  - Other spoken: Hindi
- Time zone: UTC+5:30 (IST)
- PIN: 144401
- Telephone code: 01822
- ISO 3166 code: IN-PB
- Vehicle registration: PB-09
- Website: kapurthala.gov.in

Barn is a village in Tehsil Phagwara, Kapurthala district, in Punjab, India. It is located 4 kilometres (2.5 mi) away from sub-district headquarter Phagwara and 30 km away from district headquarter Kapurthala. The village is administrated by a Sarpanch who is an elected representative of village as per the constitution of India and Panchayati raj.

== Transport ==
Phagwara Junction Railway Station, Mauli Halt Railway Station are nearby railway stations to Barn. Jalandhar City Railway Station is 23 km away from the village. The village is 118 km away from Sri Guru Ram Dass Jee International Airport in Amritsar. Another nearby airport is Sahnewal Airport in Ludhiana which is located 40 km away from the village.
