= Barn, West Virginia =

Unincorporated community in West Virginia, US

Coordinates: 37°34′33″N 81°10′45″W

Barn is an unincorporated community in Mercer County, West Virginia, United States.

== History ==
A post office called Barn was established in 1879, and remained in operation until 1940. A large barn near the original town site caused the name to be selected.
