= Districts of Jordan =

Subdivisions in Jordan

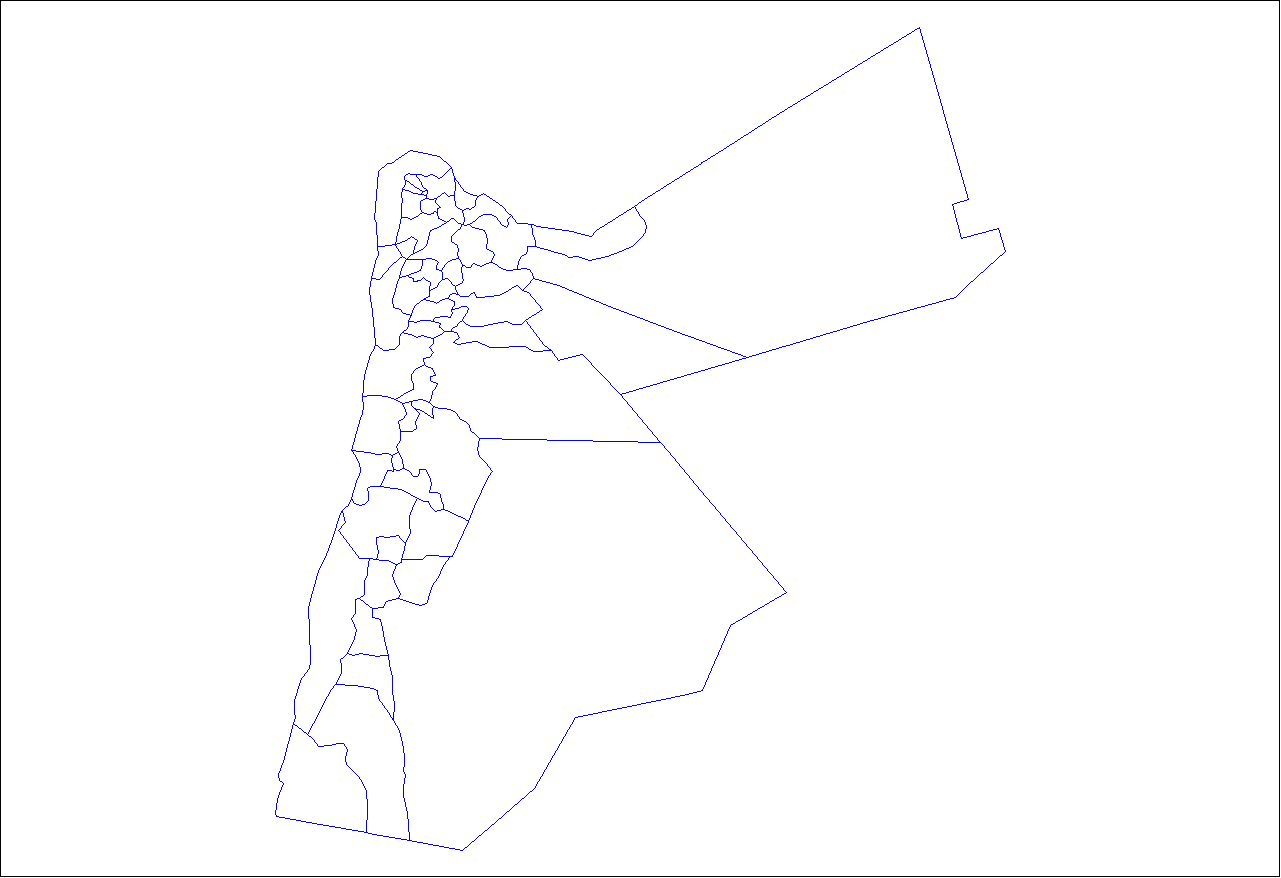
Districts of Jordan

A district (Arabic: لواء, romanized: liwāʾ; plural: ألوية, romanized: alwiya) is one of the administrative centres ("chief towns") in Jordan. The twelve governorates of Jordan contain fifty-two alwiya which are listed below by governorate. In many cases the name of the chief town is the same as the name of the district (liwāʾ) or sub-district (qaḍāʾ) administered.

== Central Jordan ==
=== Amman Governorate ===
- Amman
- Al-Jiza
- Al-Muwwaqqar
- Na'oor
- Al-Quesmah
- Sahab
- Marka
- Wadi al-Sayr
- University

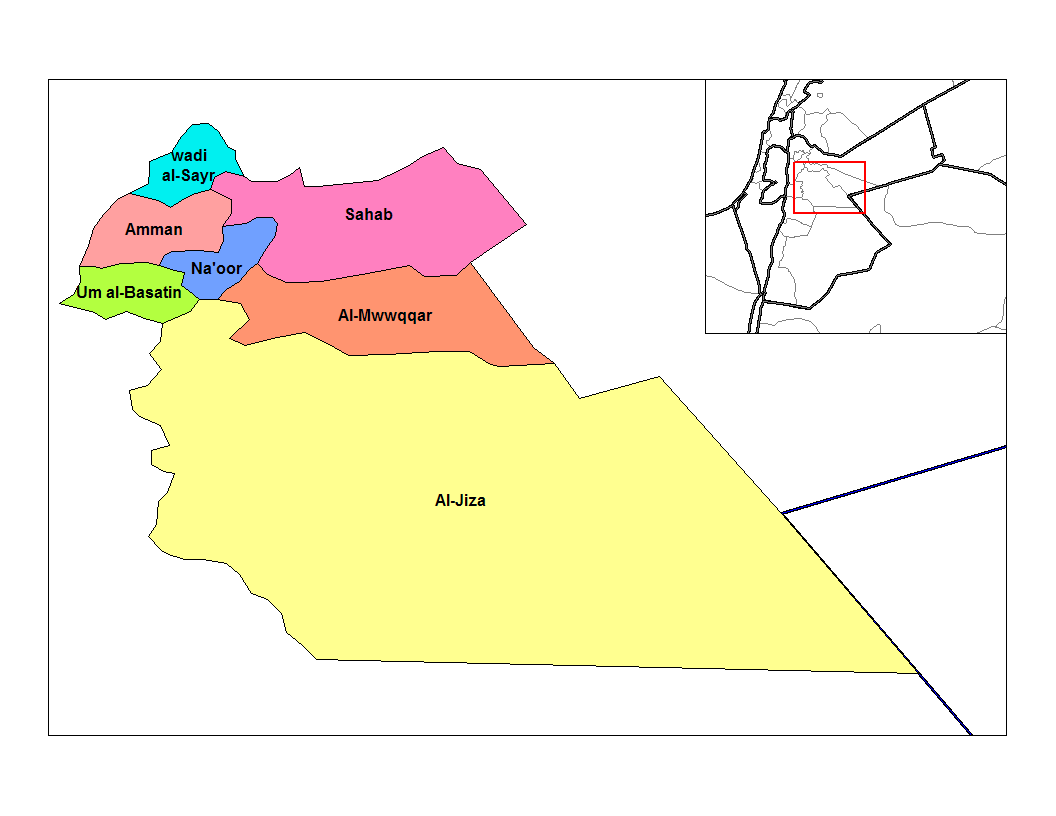
Districts of Amman Governorate

=== Balqa Governorate ===
- Mahes & Fuhais
- Albasha
- As-Salt
- Dair Alla
- Ash-Shunah al-Janubiyah District
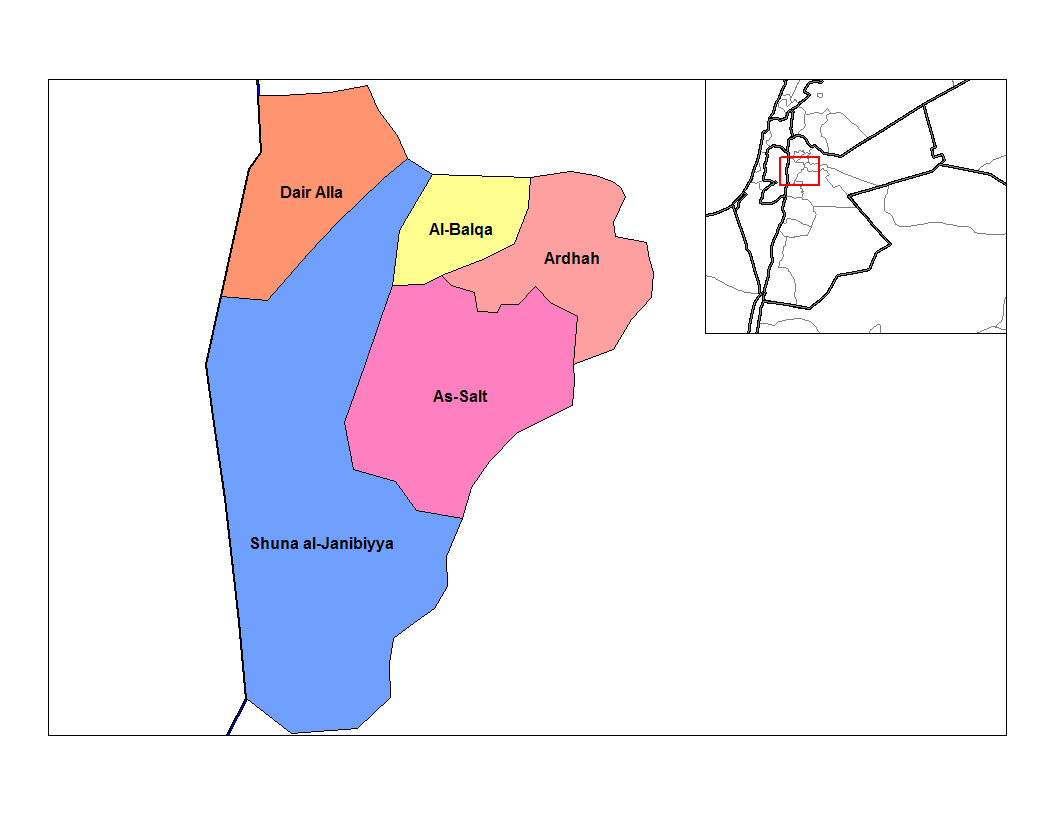
  Districts of Balqa

=== Madaba Governorate ===
- Dhiban
- Madaba
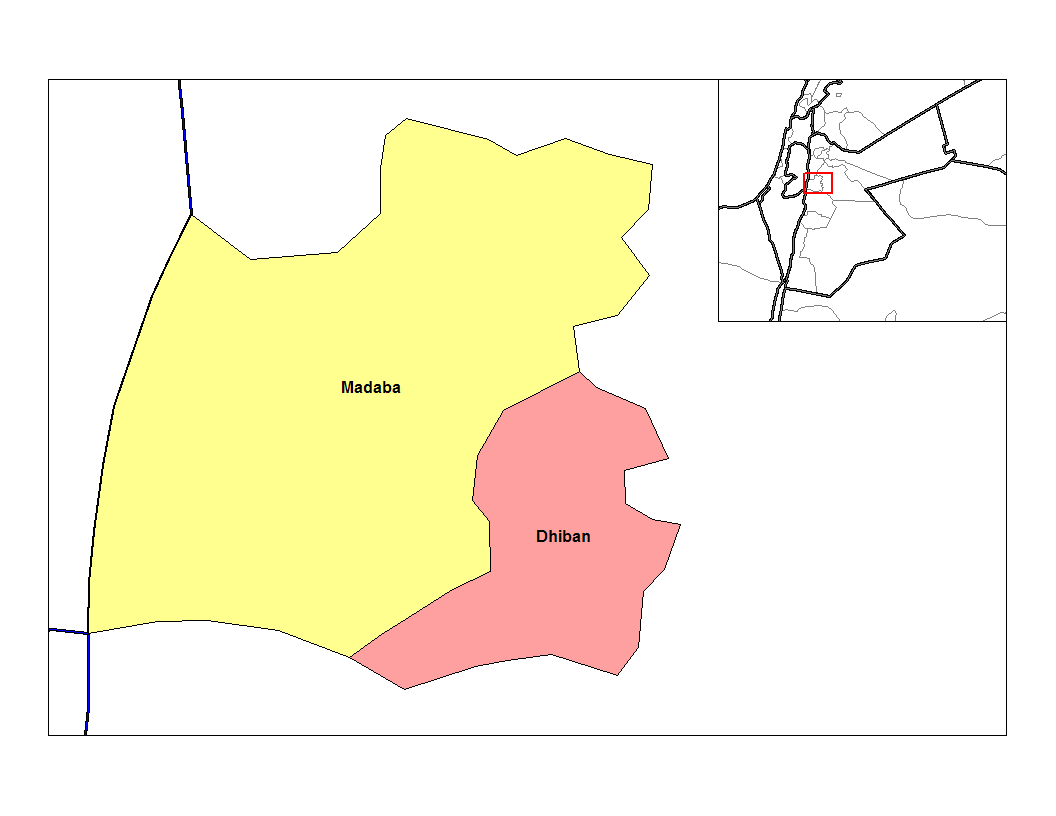
  Districts of Madaba

=== Zarqa Governorate ===
- Russeifa
- Az-Zarqa
- Hashemiyah
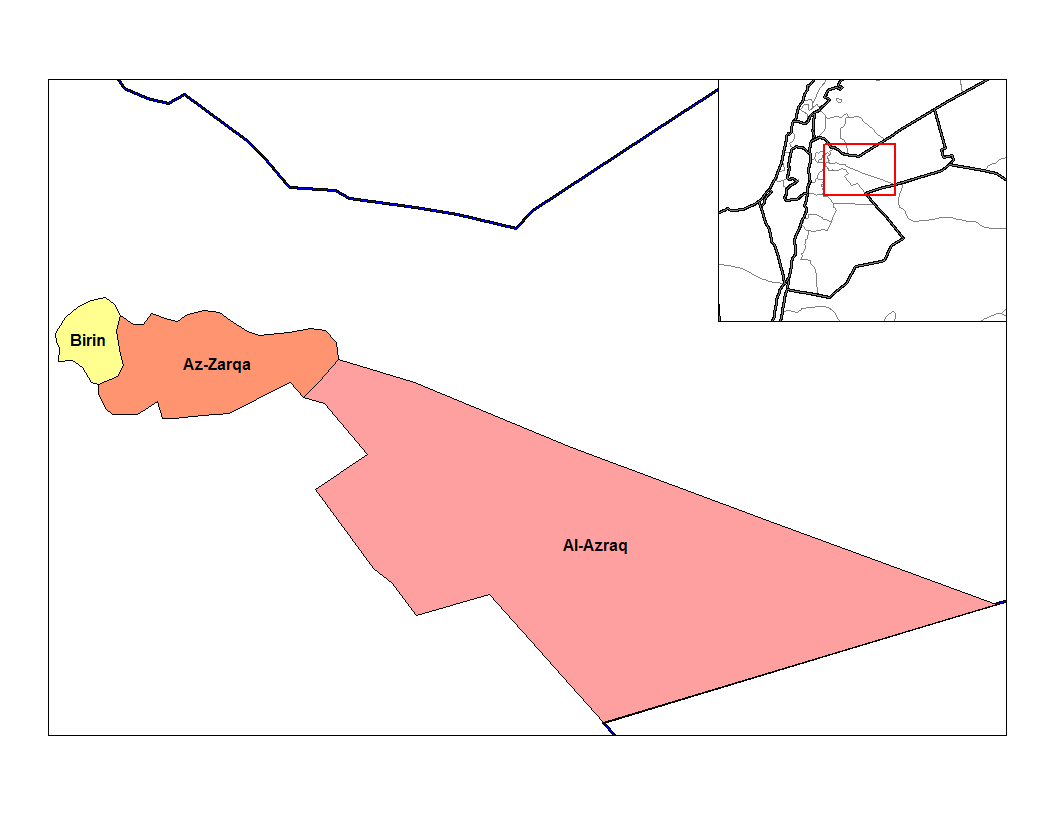
  Districts of Zarqa

== North Jordan ==
=== Ajlun Governorate ===
- Ajlun
- Kofranjah
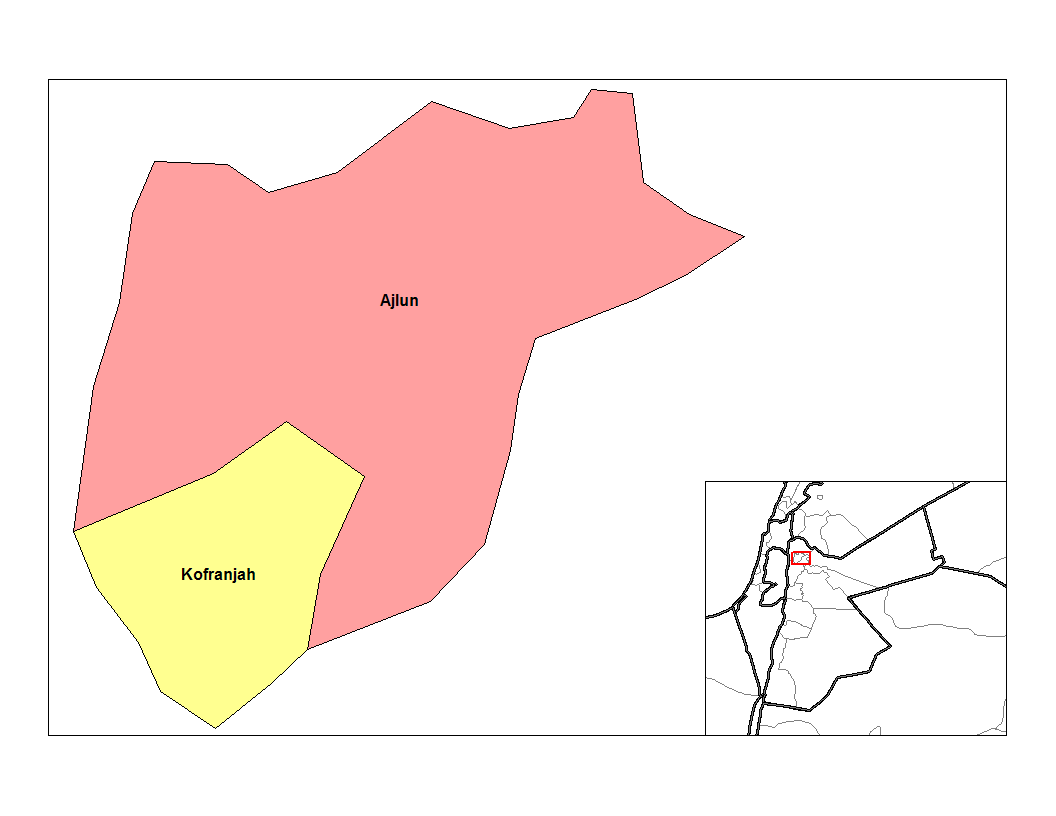
  Districts of Ajlun

=== Irbid Governorate ===
- Irbid
- Al-Ramtha
- Al-Aghwar Shamaliyyeh
- Bani Kinanah
- Bani Obeid
- Kourah
- Mazar Shamaliyyeh
- Tayybeh
- Wastiyyeh

=== Jerash Governorate ===
- Jerash
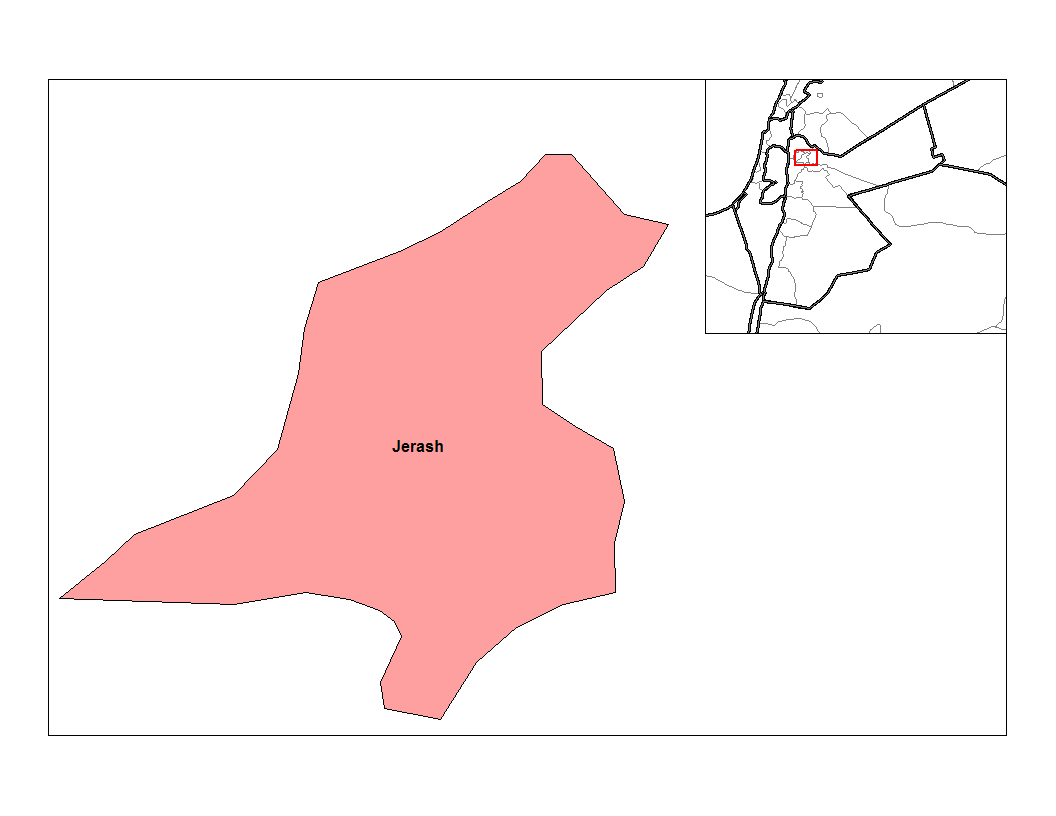
  Nahia of Jerash

=== Mafraq Governorate ===
- Al-Mafraq
- Ar-Ruwayshid
- Badiah Gharbiyah
- Badiah Shamaliyah
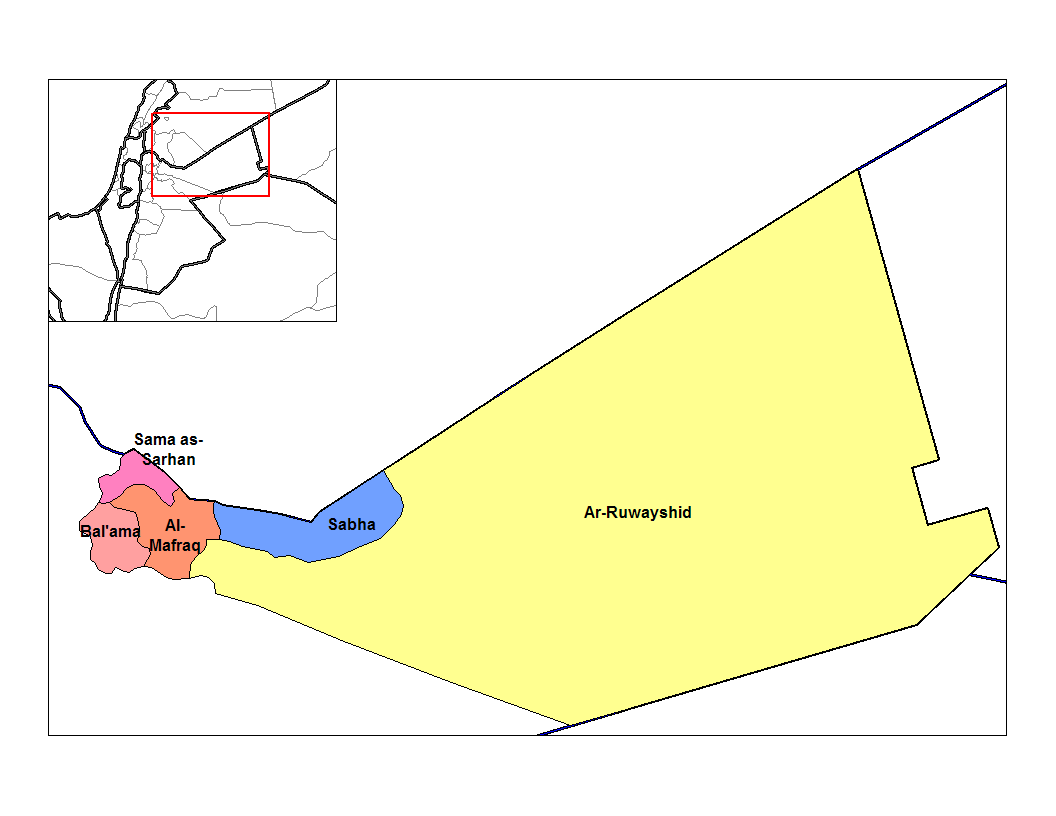
  Districts of Mafraq

== South Jordan ==
=== Aqaba Governorate ===
- Al-Aqaba
- Al-Quwayra
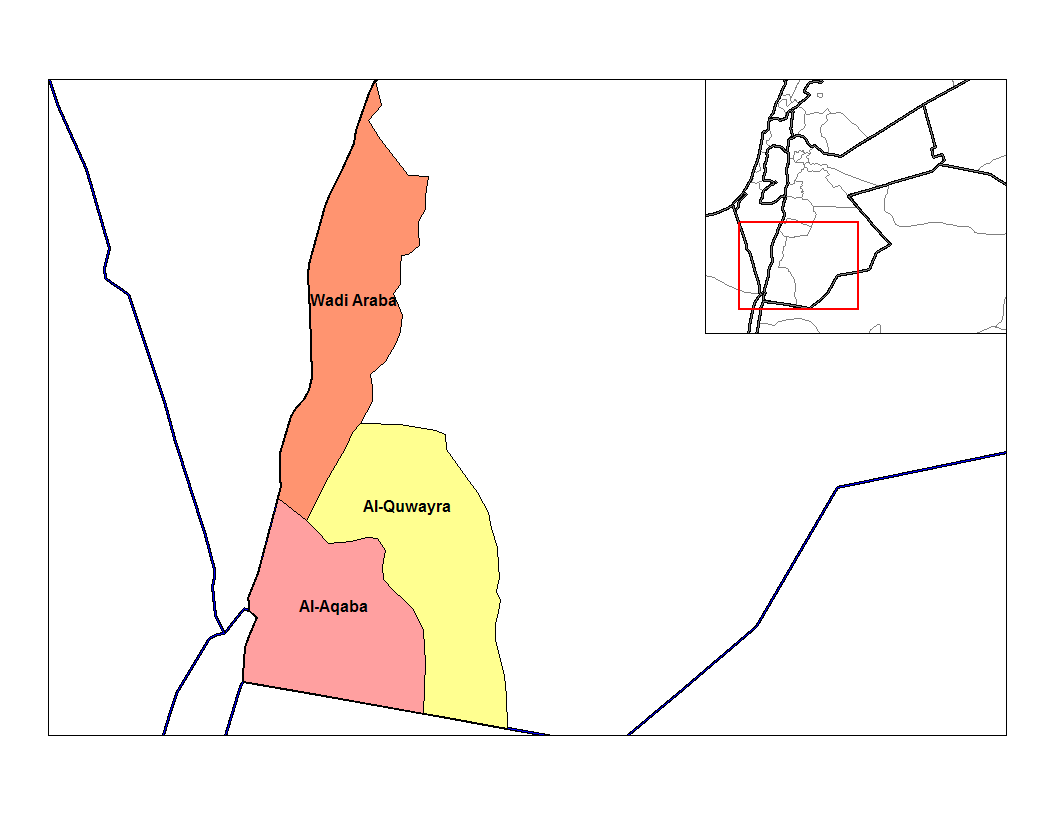
  Districts of Aqaba

=== Karak Governorate ===
- Al-Karak
- Qatraneh
- Ayy'
- Faqqu'
- Al-Mazar al-Janubiyya
- Al-Qasr
- Aghwar Janoobiyah
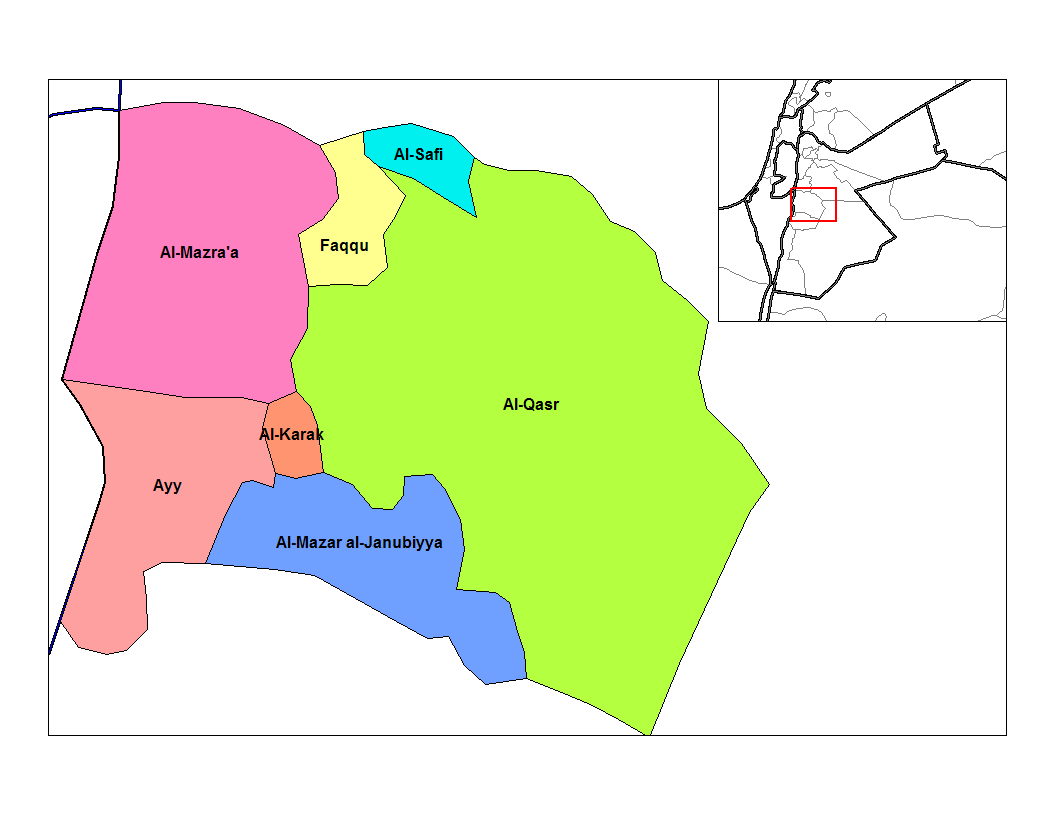
  Districts of Karak

=== Ma'an Governorate ===
- Ma'an
- Petra
- Al-Husayniyya
- Shoubak
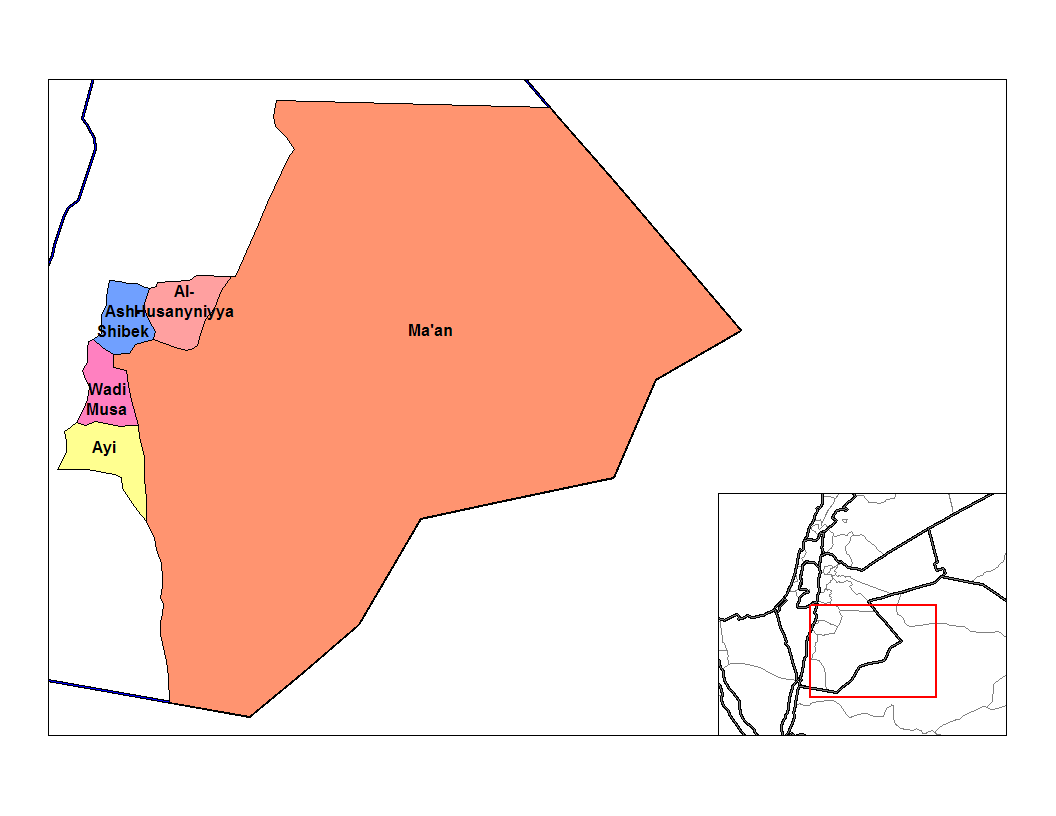
  Districts of Ma'an

=== Tafilah Governorate ===
- Al-Tafila
- Al-Hasa
- Birsayra
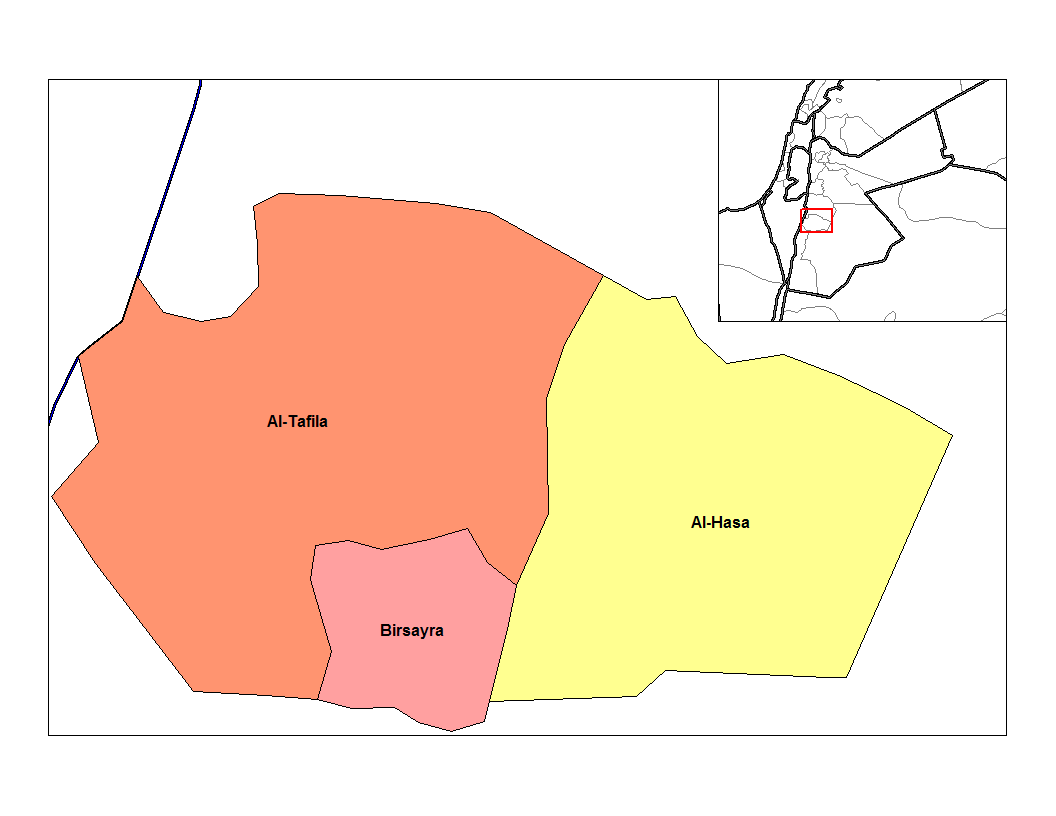
  Districts of Tafilah

== See also ==
- Governorates of Jordan
