= Qatrana Power Plant =

Power plant in Jordan

Al Qatrana Power Plant
- Official name: Qatrana Electric Power Company
- Country: Jordan
- Location: Al Qatrana
- Coordinates: 31°13′20″N 36°1′7″E
- Status: Operational
- Commission date: 27 February 2012
- Construction cost: US$500 million
- Owners: KEPCO; Xenel Industries
- Operator: Qatrana Electric Power Company

Thermal power station
- Primary fuel: Natural gas
- Secondary fuel: Distillate fuel oil
- Combined cycle?: Yes

Power generation
- Units operational: 2 x 120 MW; 1 x 130 MW
- Make and model: Škoda Power
- Nameplate capacity: 373 MW

Al Qatrana power plant (Qatrana power plant) is a natural gas-fired power plant in Al Qatrana, 100 kilometres (62 mi) south of Amman, Jordan. The generating capacity of the power plant is 373 MW. Natural gas is supplied to the plant through the Arab Gas Pipeline.

The construction started in May 2009 and the plant was inaugurated on 27 February 2012. It cost about US$500 million. The power plant was constructed by Korea Electric Power Corporation, which received the right to operate the power plant until 2035. It owns 80% stake in the power station operator company— Qatrana Electric Power Company—while the rest (20%) is owned by Xenel Industries.

== See also ==
- Al-Qatraneh district
- Qatraneh town
- Qasr al-Qatraneh, fortified khan (inn) along the hajj route
