= Rabba =

Town in Karak Governorate, Jordan

Coordinates: 31°16′N 35°44′E

Rabba (Arabic: ٱلرَّبَّة, romanized: Ar-Rabbah) is a town in Jordan in the Karak Governorate. As ancient Areopolis, it is a former bishopric and present Latin Catholic titular see.

Rabba lies about 15 kilometres (9.3 miles) north of the city of Al-Karak. It had a population of about 7200 in 2015.

== Geography ==
Rabba lies on the historical King's Highway. It is situated on a thin semi-fertile plain, giving way to Wadi Ibn Hammad in the west, and the desert in the east. Located near the northern edge of the town is the Farming College, a branch of Mu'tah University.

=== Climate ===
Climate data for Rabba (1989–2018)
Month	Jan	Feb	Mar	Apr	May	Jun	Jul	Aug	Sep	Oct	Nov	Dec	Year
Mean daily maximum °C (°F)	12.4 (54.3)	13.7 (56.7)	17.5 (63.5)	22.7 (72.9)	27.1 (80.8)	30.2 (86.4)	31.8 (89.2)	32.0 (89.6)	30.3 (86.5)	27.1 (80.8)	21.0 (69.8)	15.7 (60.3)	23.7 (74.7)
Mean daily minimum °C (°F)	3.3 (37.9)	3.7 (38.7)	5.9 (42.6)	8.8 (47.8)	12.5 (54.5)	15.4 (59.7)	17.7 (63.9)	17.8 (64.0)	15.9 (60.6)	13.4 (56.1)	9.0 (48.2)	5.1 (41.2)	10.7 (51.3)
Average precipitation mm (inches)	90.9 (3.58)	78.3 (3.08)	46.3 (1.82)	15.7 (0.62)	5.6 (0.22)	0.0 (0.0)	0.0 (0.0)	0.0 (0.0)	0.1 (0.00)	8.7 (0.34)	24.3 (0.96)	53.7 (2.11)	323.7 (12.74)
Average relative humidity (%)	74.2	70.4	64.1	52.5	45.7	46.9	49.0	53.0	56.8	57.5	62.1	69.6	58.5
Source: Jordan Meteorological Department

== History ==
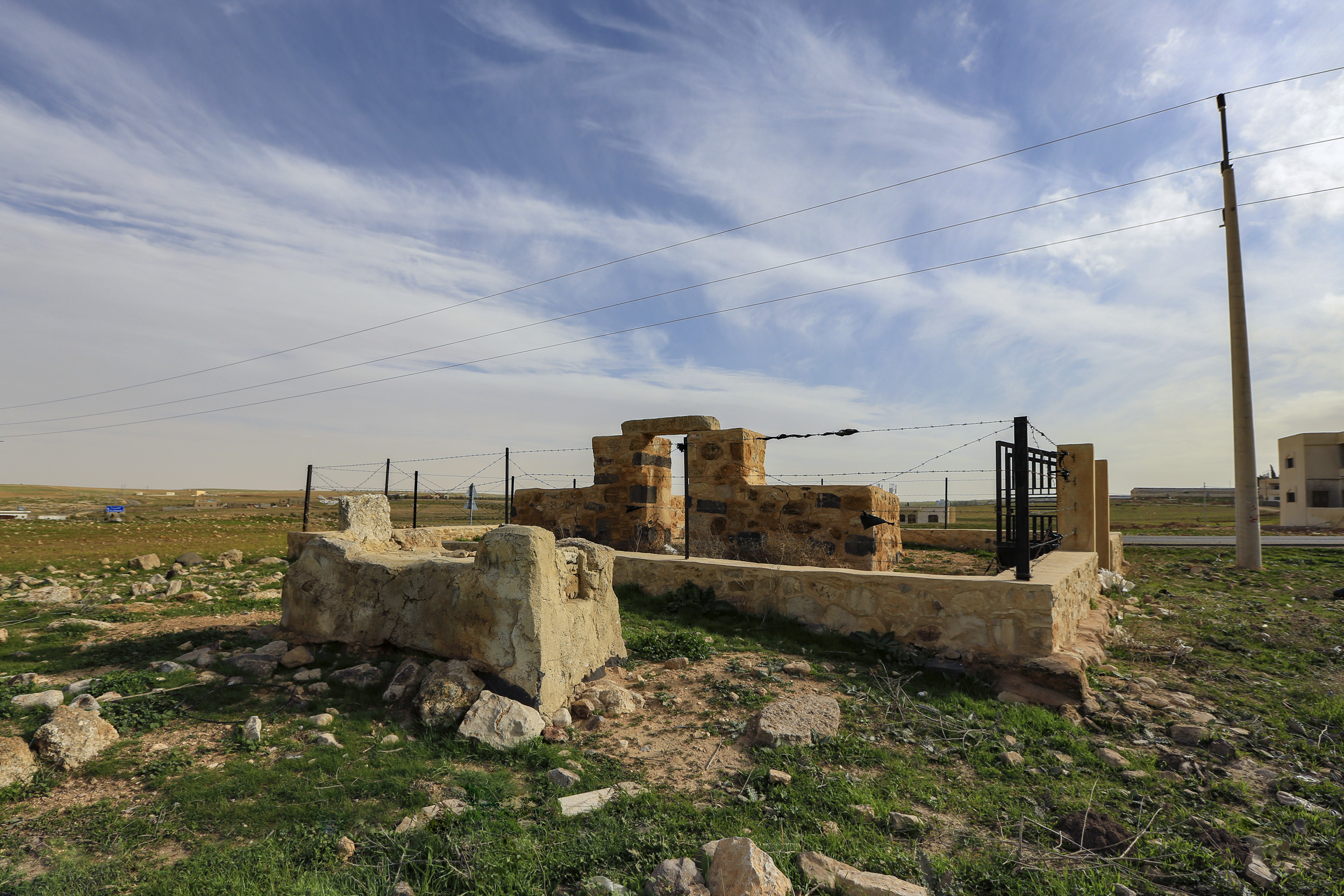
Shrine of the head of Sayyid Zayd ibn Ali, descendant of the Islamic prophet Muhammad

=== Iron Age to Byzantine period ===
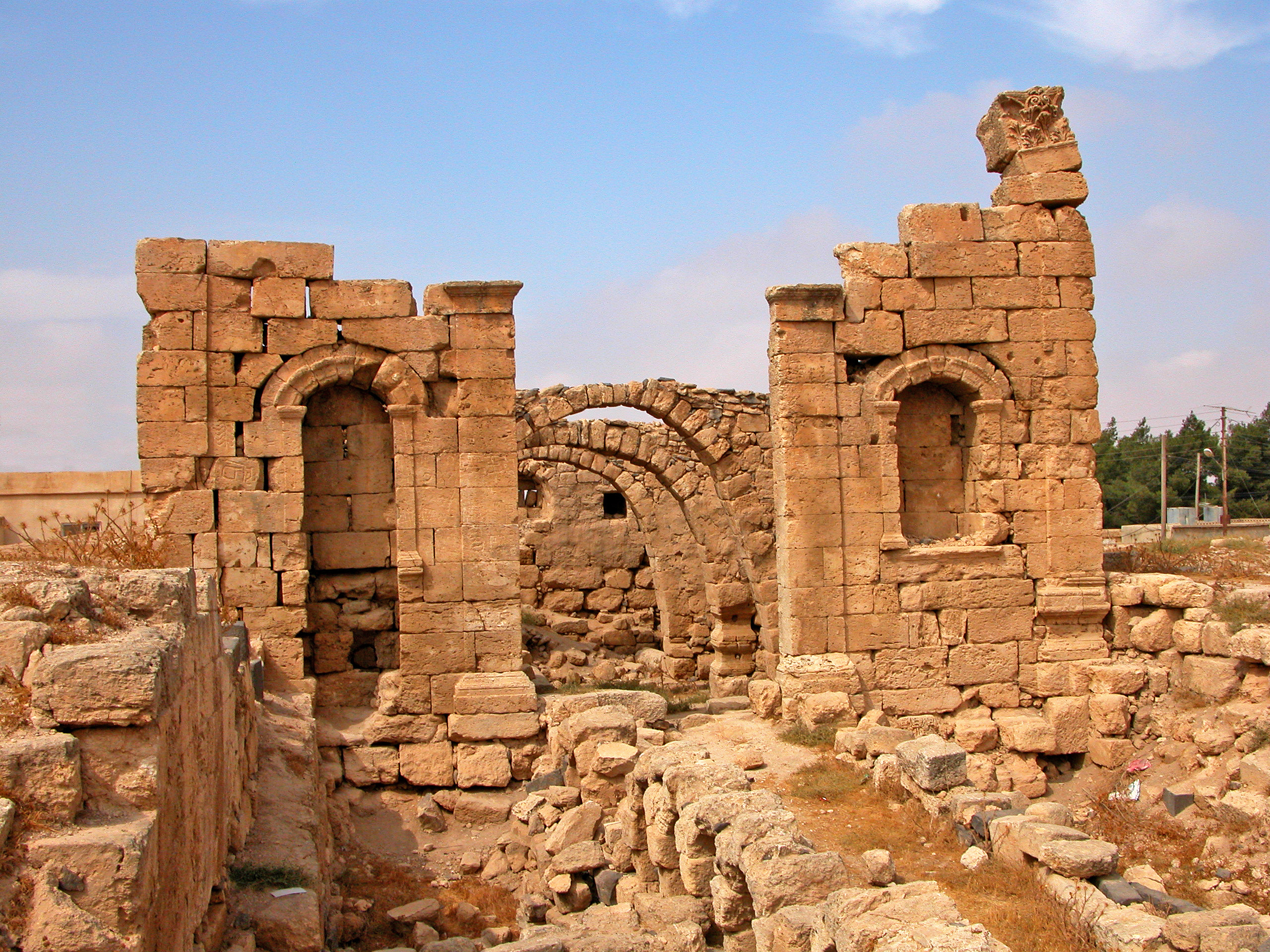
Late Roman temple of Diocletian and Maximian

Rabba was formerly known as Rabbath Moab. In the Hellenistic and Roman times it was called Areopolis, its Greek name. It was one of the two leading cities of the Karak Plateau at this time.

Areopolis is mentioned by Ptolemy, Eusebius, who cited the terrifying nature of the place, Hierocles and Stephen of Byzantium, Sozomen and also the Notitia Dignitatum The town is shown on the Tabula Peutingeriana and the Madaba map and is attested to on numerous milestones. Areopolis also minted its own coin between 193 and 222 CE.

Papyri from the Babatha archive, found in the Cave of Letters near Ein Gedi, show that in the 120s CE Rabbath-Moab was one of the towns where the Roman governor of Arabia held court and where returns for the provincial census were filed. Babatha, a Jewish woman from the village of Maoza at the southern end of the Dead Sea, travelled there in December 127 CE to register her orchards for the census, and in a later lawsuit summoned an opponent to appear "before his Excellency the governor in Rabbath Moab".

According to the Syriac Life of Barsauma, in the Byzantine period Rabba was the site of a Jewish community of 15,000 people, centered on a synagogue said to be comparable to Solomon's Temple. The text relates that in the 5th century CE the Mesopotamian monk Barsauma visited the town during his pilgrimage to the region, clashed with the locals and forced them to convert to Christianity; after its doors miraculously opened, the synagogue was set on fire and burned to the ground, Barsauma having forbidden any looting. It is unclear whether the local Jews converted to Christianity.

=== Mamluk period ===
In 1321 Abu'l-Fida noted: "Maab, or Ar Rabba lies in the Balka Province. According to the 10th-century Arab geographer al-Muhallabi, this place and Adhruh are two towns in the Jabal Ash Sharah. Maab was a very ancient town the relics of which have completely disappeared, and in its place is a village called Ar Rabbah. It is in the district of Al Karak, and lies about half a day's march from this to the north. Near Ar Rabbah is an extremely high hill, called Shaihan, which you see from afar."

=== Ottoman period ===
In 1596 it appeared in the Ottoman tax registers named as Kafr Rabba, situated in the nahiya (subdistrict) of Karak, part of the Sanjak of Ajlun. It had 16 Muslim and 3 Christian households. They paid a fixed tax-rate of 25% on agricultural products, including wheat, barley, summer crops, vineyards/fruit trees, goats and bee-hives; in addition to occasional revenues. The total tax was 12,000 akçe.

=== Jordan ===
In 1961 there were 1,073 inhabitants in Rabba, of whom 200 were Christian.

== Archaeological remains ==
Rabba is home to Nabatean, Roman and Byzantine ruins, which are located along the main street in the center of town. They consist of the remains of a Roman temple dedicated to the emperors Diocletian and Maximian, a Byzantine church and a cavernous ancient reservoir. There are many smaller ruins scattered all over town albeit not as extensive.

== Population ==
Rabba was traditionally populated largely by the Majali and Zureikat families, the first of which has considerable political influence in the country. However, since the nakba in 1948, many Palestinians - who were forced from their ancestral homes in Palestine due to unlawful occupation, the proliferation of Israeli settlements, forceful evictions, land confiscation, and home demolitions - settled in Rabba as well, now accounting for about a third of the town's population.

== Economy ==
The economy in Rabba is largely agrarian, and relies greatly on seasonal crops such as wheat and oats. Many people own sheep goats or cattle.

== Ecclesiastic history ==
=== Ancient bishopric ===
Areopolis was important enough in the Late Roman province of Palestina Tertia to become a suffragan of its capital Petra's Metropolitan Archbishopric, but was to fade.

Known bishops include:

- Anasasius of Areopolis, Council of Chalcedon
- Rufinus of Areopolis at the Council of Ephesus
- Bishop of Areopolis who attended Synod of Jerusalem 518
- John, Bishop of Areopolis, known only from an inscription of about 590AD

=== Titular see ===
In the 18th century, the diocese was nominally restored as a Latin Catholic titular bishopric Areopolis (Areopoli in Curiate Italian) and had the following incumbents of the fitting episcopal (lowest) rank. Bishops include:

- Pietro d’Alcántara della Santissima Trinità Gagna di Cherasco, OCD (1728.01.28 – 1744.11.03)
- João da Madre de Deus Seixas da Fonseca Borges, OSB (1733.09.28 – 1768.03.05)
- Florence of Jesus of Nazareth Szostak, OCD (1746.01.19 – 1773.07.26)
- pl:Tomasz Ignacy Zienkowicz(1755.07.21 – 1790.12.09)
- William Wareing (1840.06.05 – 1850.09.29)
- de:Anton Frenzel (1852.09.27 – 1873.04.03)
- Blessed Ciriaco María Sancha y Hervás (1876.01.28 – 1882.03.27) (later Cardinal*)
- Francesco Giordani (1882.07.03 – 1887.11.25)
- Gabriele Gzele (1888.06.01 – 1903)

In 1903 it was promoted as Titular archbishopric, and as such had the following incumbents of the fitting archiepiscopal (intermediary) rank :

- Titular Archbishop Henry Moeller (1903.04.27 – 1904.10.31)
- Titular Archbishop Lazare Miedia (1904.12.24 – 1909.04.14)
- Titular Archbishop it:Paolo Emilio Bergamaschi (1910.07.26 – 1925.02.10)
- Titular Archbishop Saint Angelo Giuseppe Roncalli (1925.03.03 – 1934.11.30) (later Pope John XXIII*)

In March 1925 it was demoted back to titular bishopric. It is vacant since decades, having had the following incumbents of fitting episcopal rank :

- Michael Joseph Keyes, Marists (S.M.) (1935.09.23 – 1959.08.07)
- Leonardo Gregorio Gallardo Heredia (1960.02.13 – 1961.05.23)
- René-Noël-Joseph Kérautret (1961.07.22 – 1965.05.09)

== Bibliography ==
- Government of Jordan, Department of Statistics (1964). First Census of Population and Housing. Volume I: Final Tables; General Characteristics of the Population (PDF).
- Hütteroth, W.-D.; Abdulfattah, K. (1977). Historical Geography of Palestine, Transjordan and Southern Syria in the Late 16th Century. Erlanger Geographische Arbeiten, Sonderband 5. Erlangen, Germany: Vorstand der Fränkischen Geographischen Gesellschaft. ISBN 3-920405-41-2.
- Le Strange, G. (1890). Palestine Under the Moslems: A Description of Syria and the Holy Land from A.D. 650 to 1500. Committee of the Palestine Exploration Fund.

== Sources and external links ==
- GCatholic with titular incumbent bio links
- Manar al-Athar Digital Archive - Rabba temple
