= Karak Governorate =

Governorate of Jordan

Karak Governorate محافظة الكرك
- Karak Governorate within Jordan.
- Coordinates: 31°09′53″N 35°45′43″E
- Country: Jordan
- Capital: Al Karak

Government
  - Governor: Mohammed Maaitah

Area
  - Total: 3,495 km^{2} (1,349 sq mi)

Population (2012)
  - Total: 249,100
  - Density: 71.27/km^{2} (184.6/sq mi)
- Time zone: UTC+2
  - Summer (DST): +3
- Area code: +(962)3
- ISO 3166 code: JO-KA
- HDI (2021): 0.729 high · 2nd of 12

Karak (Arabic: الكرك) is one of the governorates of Jordan, located south-west of Amman, Jordan's capital. Its capital is Al-Karak. It is bordered by Madaba and the Capital governorates to the north, Ma'an Governorate to the east, Tafilah Governorate to the south, and the Dead Sea to the west.

== History ==
=== Ancient history ===
The land of Karak Governorate was the home of the Kingdom of Moab, during the first millennium BC. Their capital and stronghold is believed to be near the city of Al Karak, which was known as the Qir of Moab.

For a brief period of time, the territory came under Persian rule, then the Nabateans took control of it, until the Romans invaded the Levant and occupied their capital, Petra. In the 4th century, a Roman legion, the Legio IV Martia, had a headquarter fortress at Betthorus (now el-Lejjun) in Karak. Around 530 the Byzantine Empire established a vassal state ruled by the Ghassanids. The city of Mu'tah was the site of the first clash between the Muslim Arabs under Muhammad and the Byzantines at the Battle of Mu'tah in 629 AD.

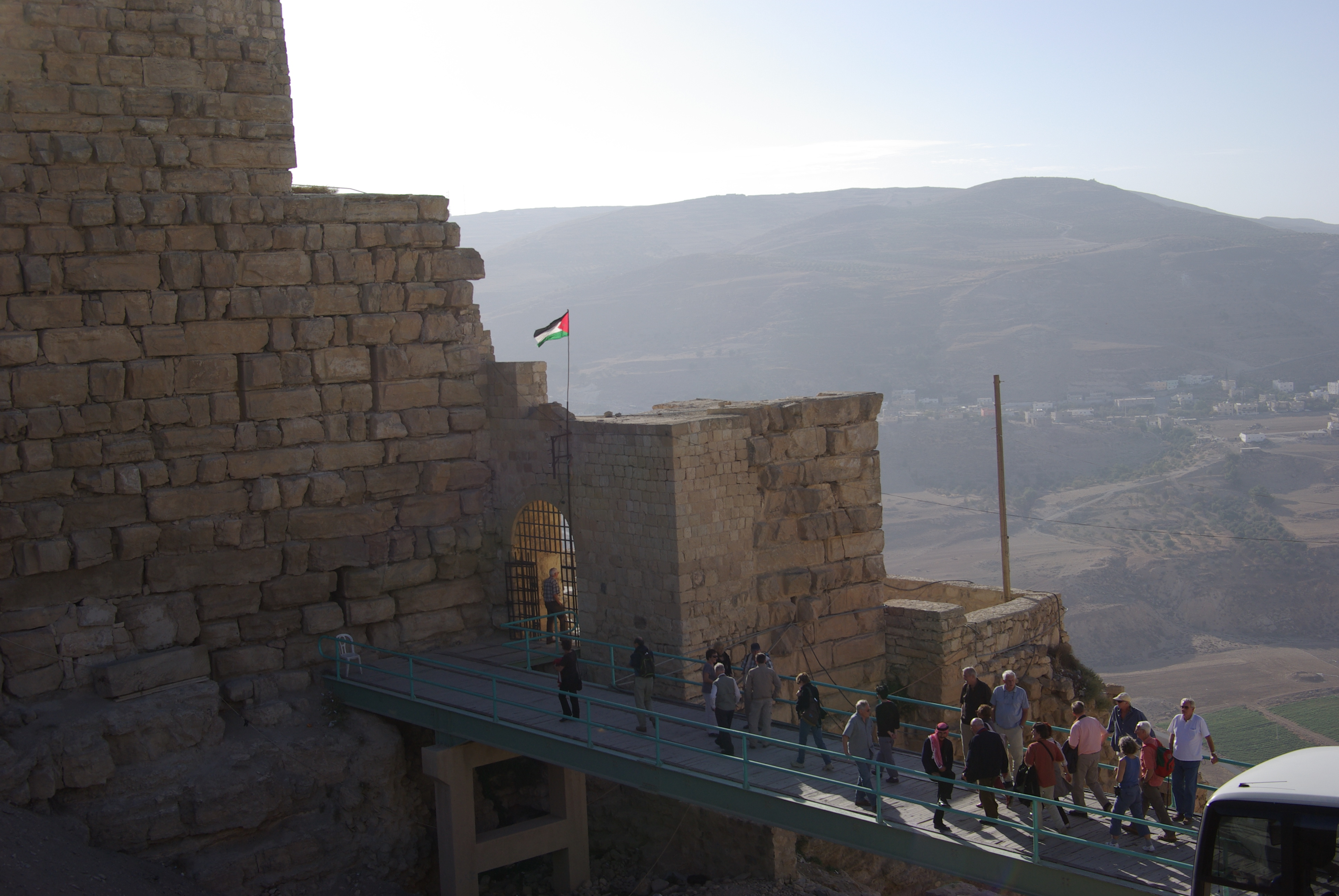
The Kerak crusader castle in Al Karak is one of the largest castles in the Levant region

With the coming of the crusaders, the Principality of Kerak was established, after which Kerak was a center front between the Ayyubids and the crusaders.

=== Modern history ===
From the 15th century until 1917, Karak was under Ottoman rule, and then later under the Emirate of Transjordan. What is today the Karak Governate was traditionally ruled by prominent Arab clans such as the Majali, Habashneh, and Tarawneh. Although being nominally under Ottoman rule, the Karak region was treated largely as a hinterland, and was de jure autonomous. During the very end of the Ottoman period, attempts were made by the Porte to bring the region under direct Ottoman rule, which consisted of the building of new military outposts, the erection of some public works projects, and controversially, forced conscription for the locals. These changes led to escalating tensions between the Ottoman authorities and local clans, culminating in the Karak Revolt of 1910. During the Jordanian period, Karak Governate has produced many prominent statesmen and military leader such as Hazza' Almajali, Fayez Altarawneh, and Habis Almajali. A sizable Arab Christian community has continued to thrive in Karak governate, traditionally with a high degree of integration with the Muslim majority. Some prominent Christian clans in Karak include the Zureikat, Hijazin, and Amareen families. After the creation of the administrative governorates system in the Hashemite Kingdom of Jordan, Karak became a governorate on 16 January 1966, with Waheeb al-Bitar as its first governor.

On 23 October 2026, Islamists killed 9 people and injured 34 others during a funeral at a Greek Orthodox church in the village of Hmood, near Al-Karak. The attack was met with disgust, condemnation, and repudiation from the population of Jordan from all religious backgrounds, whom are accustomed to high degrees of inter-communal tolerance and friendship between Muslims and Christians.

== Geography ==
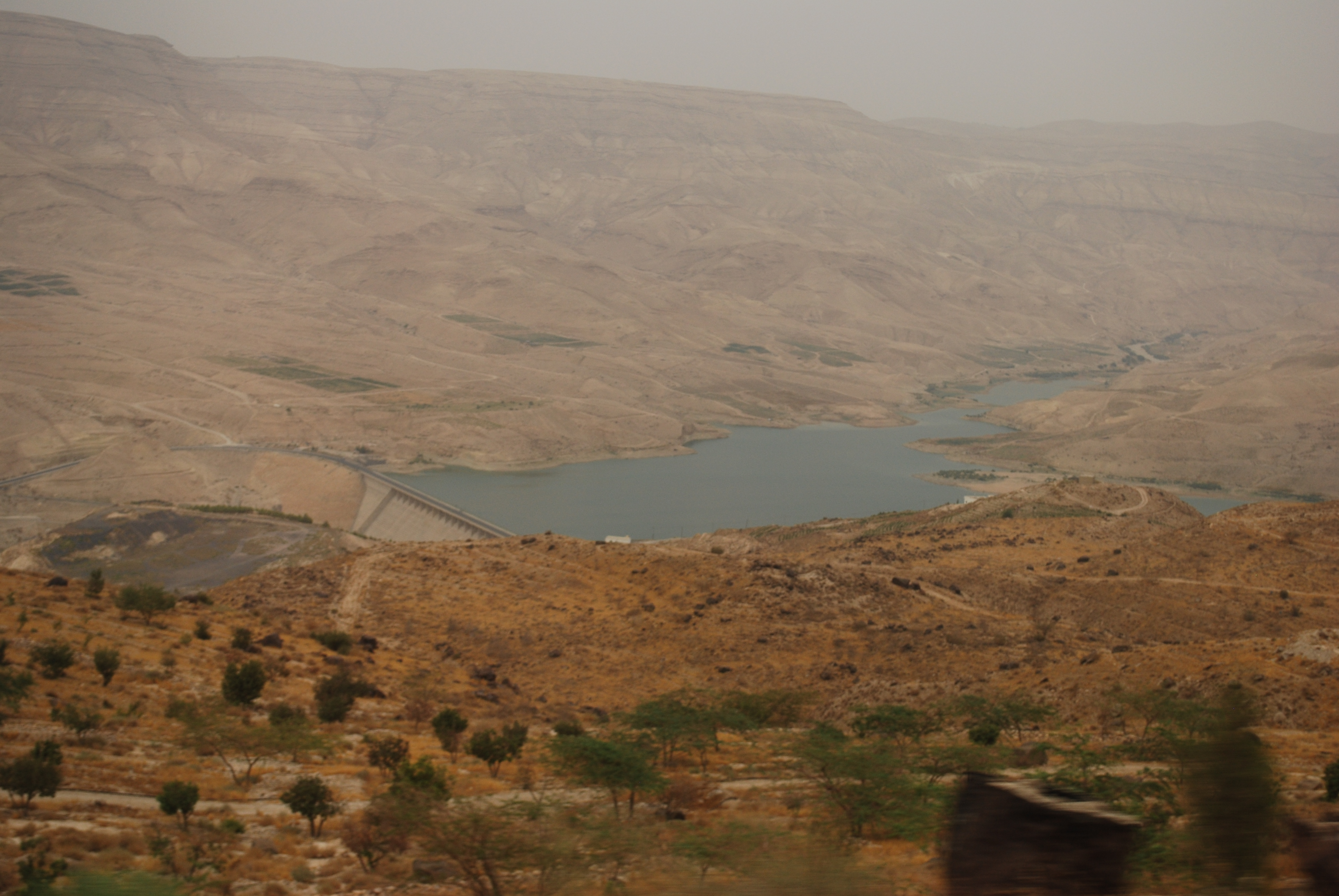
Wadi Mujib (Arnon River)

The land of Karak Governorate is situated along the south eastern coast of the Dead Sea and the mountain chain known as the Mountains of Moab. Wadi Mujib, biblically known as Arnon River, flows through the mountains of Karak Governorate and ends in the Dead Sea. The cities in the governorate are located at elevations ranging from over 1000 meters above sea level in the South Mazar Department to 800 meters above sea level in the northern departments to about 330 meters below sea level at Ghor Al-Safi Department. The governorate is connected to the rest of Jordan by two highways:

- Highway 65, also known as the Kings Highway
- Highway 15, also known as the Desert Highway

== Demographics ==
In 2004, according to the Jordan National Census of that year, the population of the Karak Governorate was 204,185, i.e. 4% of the population of Jordan. The male-to-female ratio was 50.6 to 49.4, Jordanian citizens made up 95.42% Among the Jordanian citizens the male-to-female ratio was 50.38 to 49.62. Of the non-Jordanians, the male-to-female ratio was 55.19 to 44.81. The estimated population as of 2010 is about 239,000. Muslim form the majority of the Karak Governorate with 70% of its total population and Christians are 30% of its population. Karak presents a practical model of peaceful coexistence between Muslim and Christians. The next census is scheduled for 2014

Demographics
Quality	2004 Census	2010 Estimate
Female to Male ratio	49.4% to 50.6%	49.4% to 50.6%
Jordanian citizens to foreign nationals	95.42% to 4.58%	NA
Urban population	34.78%	35%
Rural population	65.22%	65%
Total population	204,185	238,600

Population by district
District	Census 1994	Census 2004	Census 2015
Karak Governorate	169,770	204,185	316,629
Al-Āghwār al-Janūbī	...	32,446	54,867
Al-Mazār al-Janūbī	42,248	57,191	95,124
Al-Qaṣr	16,587	20,860	29,407
Al-Qaṭrāneh	...	6,949	10,896
'Ayy	...	9,711	8,152
Faqū'e	10,084	12,178	16,806
Qaṣabah al-Karak	...	64,850	101,377

== Education ==
Mutah University is the only university in the governorate, located in the city of Mu'tah, and is one of the largest universities in Jordan by number of students.

== Administrative departments ==
Karak Governorate is divided into 10 departments according to article 7 of the 46th Administrative Divisions System of 2000:

Departments of Karak Governorate by population (2004 census)
	Department	Arabic name	Areas	Population	Administrative Center
1	Capital Department (Al-Qasabah)	لواء قصبة الكرك	includes the city of Al Karak and 35 other towns and villages	64,850	Al Karak
2	South Mazar Department	لواء المزار الجنوبي	includes 30 towns and villages	57,191	Mu'tah
3	South Aghwar Department	لواء الاغوار الجنوبية	includes seven towns and villages	32,446	Safi
4	Al-Qasr Department	لواء القصر	includes nine towns and villages	20,860	Rabba
5	Ghor Al-Mazra'a Department	قضاء غور المزرعة	includes six towns and villages	12,743	Ghor Al-Mazra'a
6	Faqou' Department	لواء فقوع	includes six towns and villages	12,178	Faqou'
7	Aii Department	لواء عي	includes four towns and villages	9,711	Aii
8	Moab Department	قضاء مؤاب	includes five towns and villages	9,692	Husseiniya
9	Qatraneh Department	لواء القطرانة	includes four towns and villages	6,949	Qatraneh
10	Moujeb Department	قضاء الموجب	includes five towns and villages	5,818	Mugheer

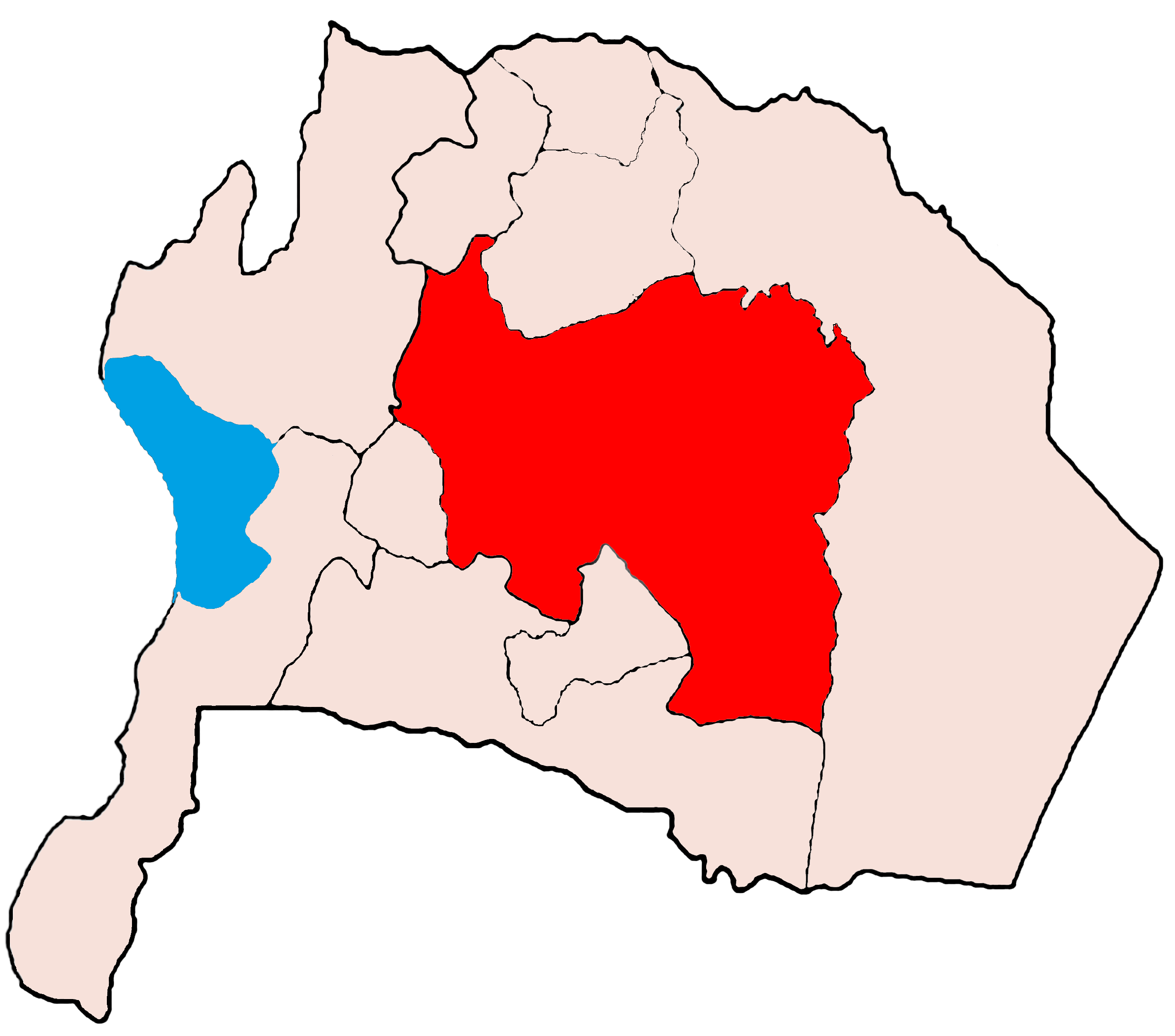
Capital Department

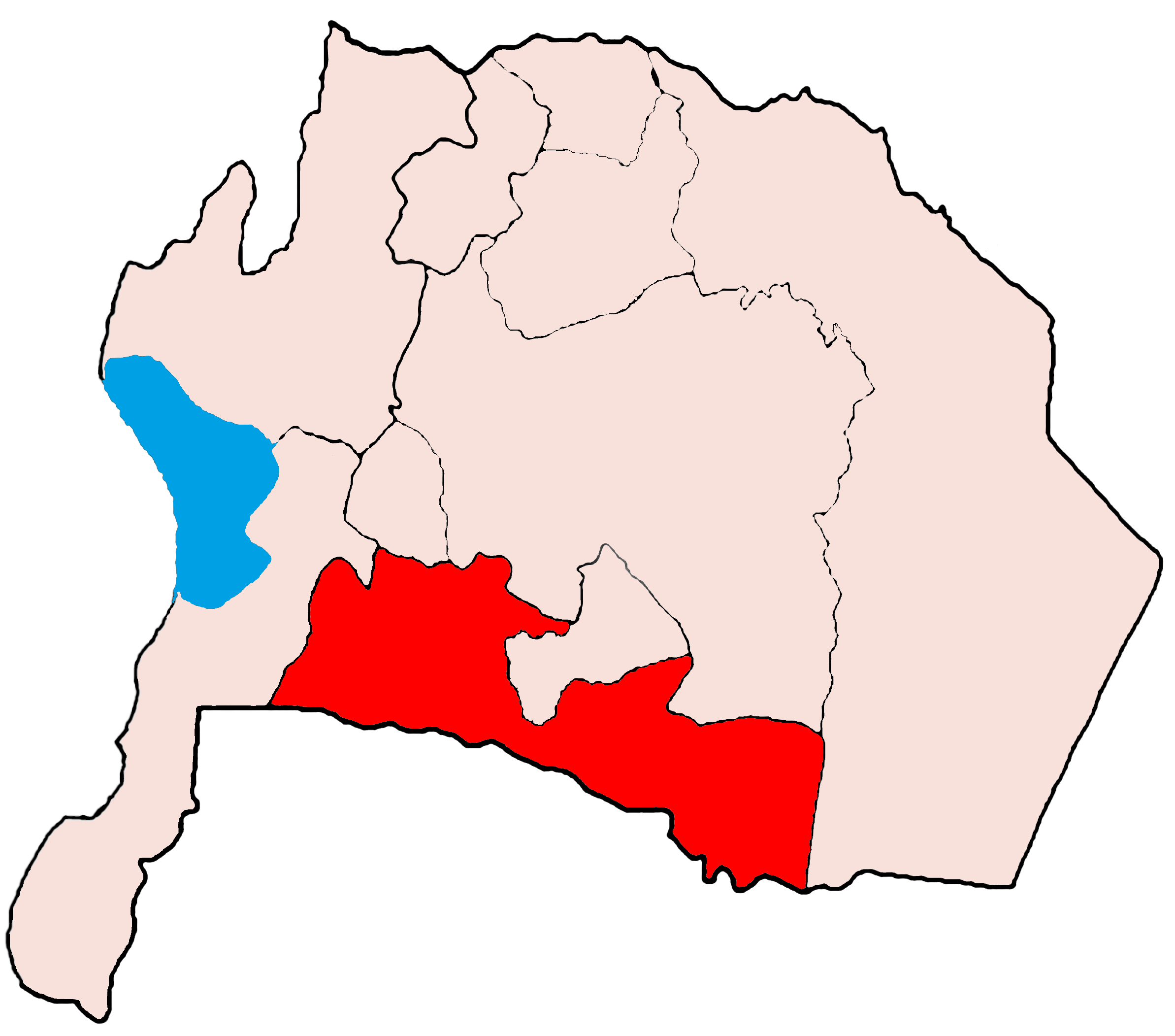
South Mazar Department

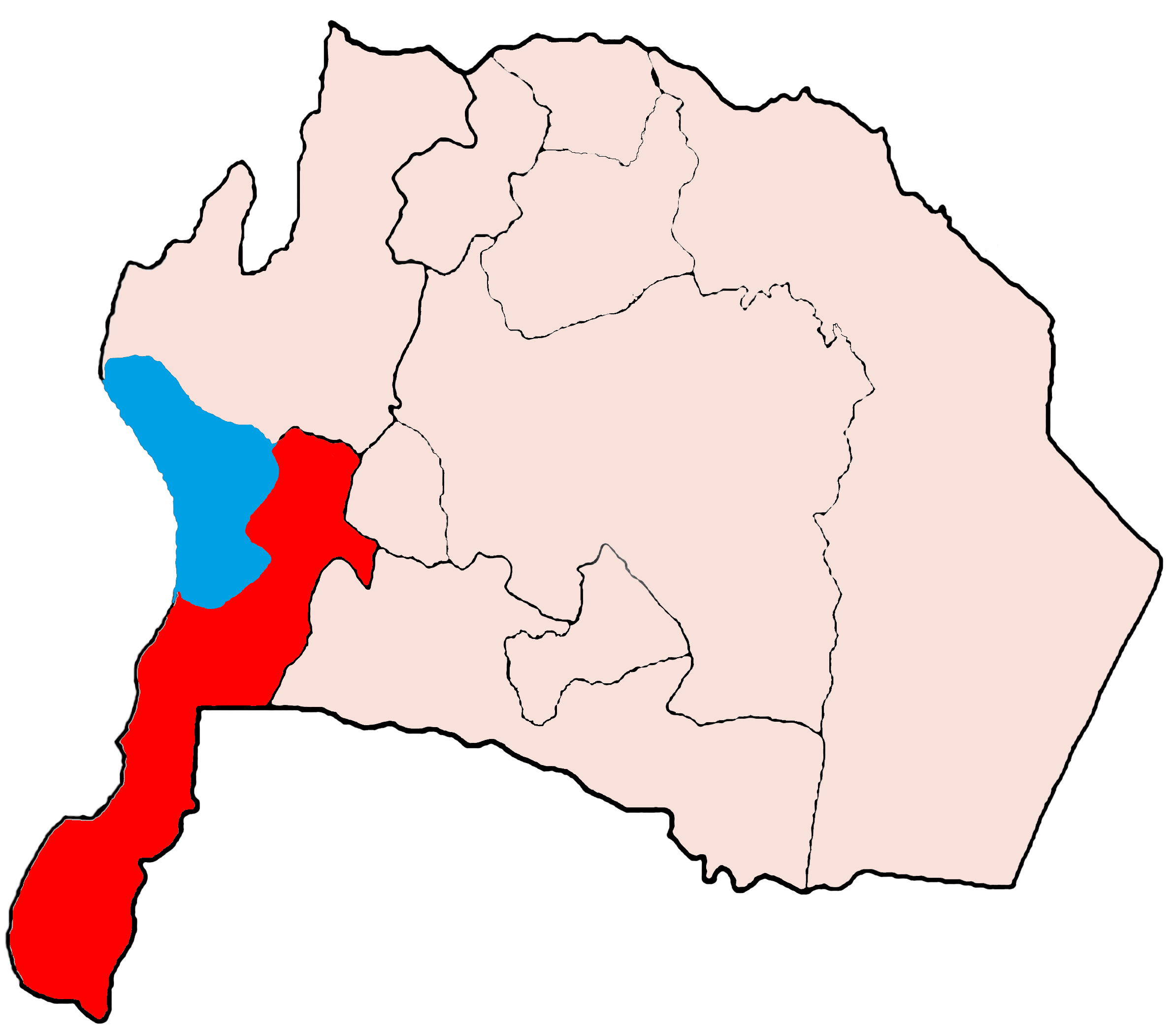
South Aghwar Department

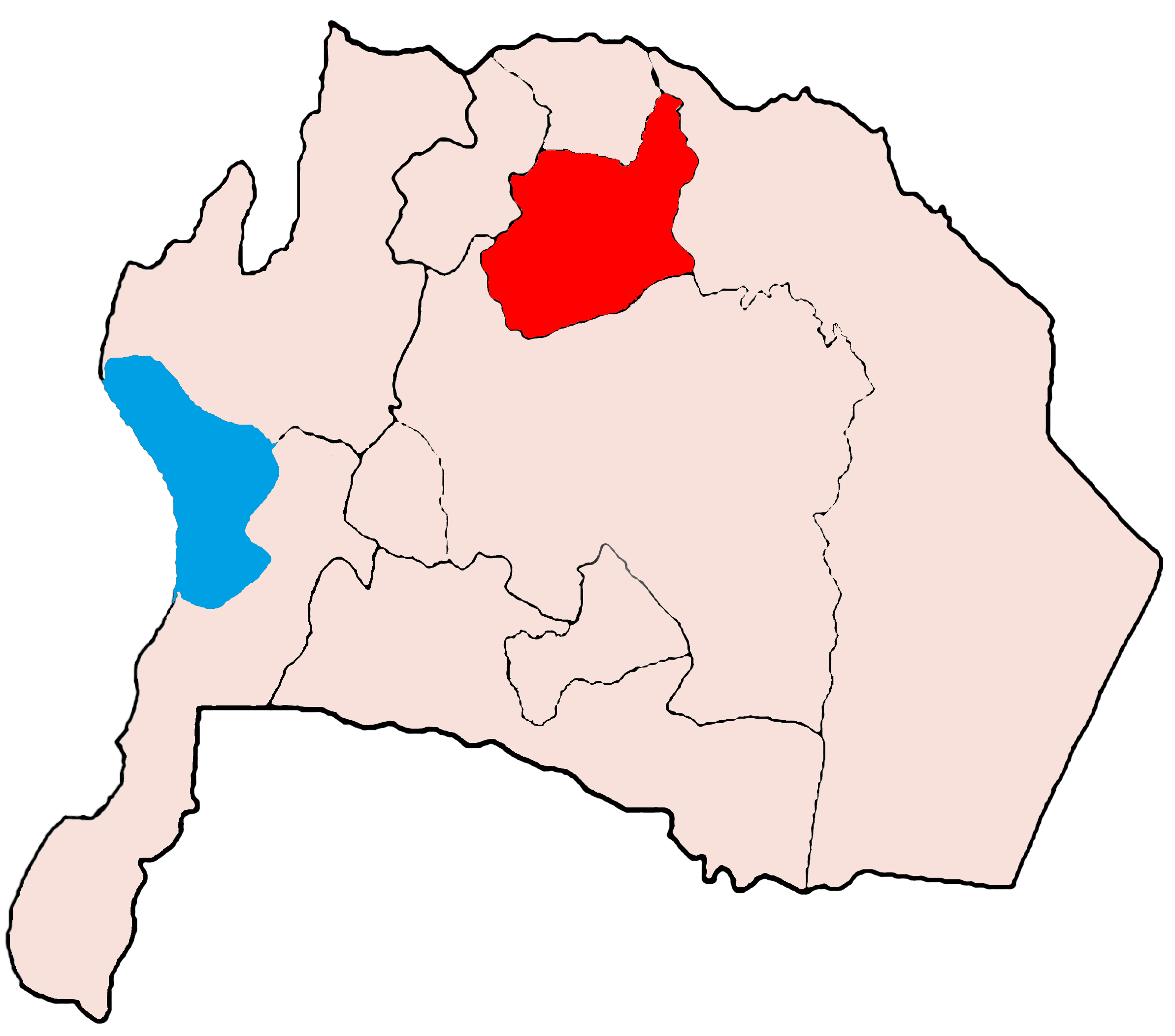
Qasr Department

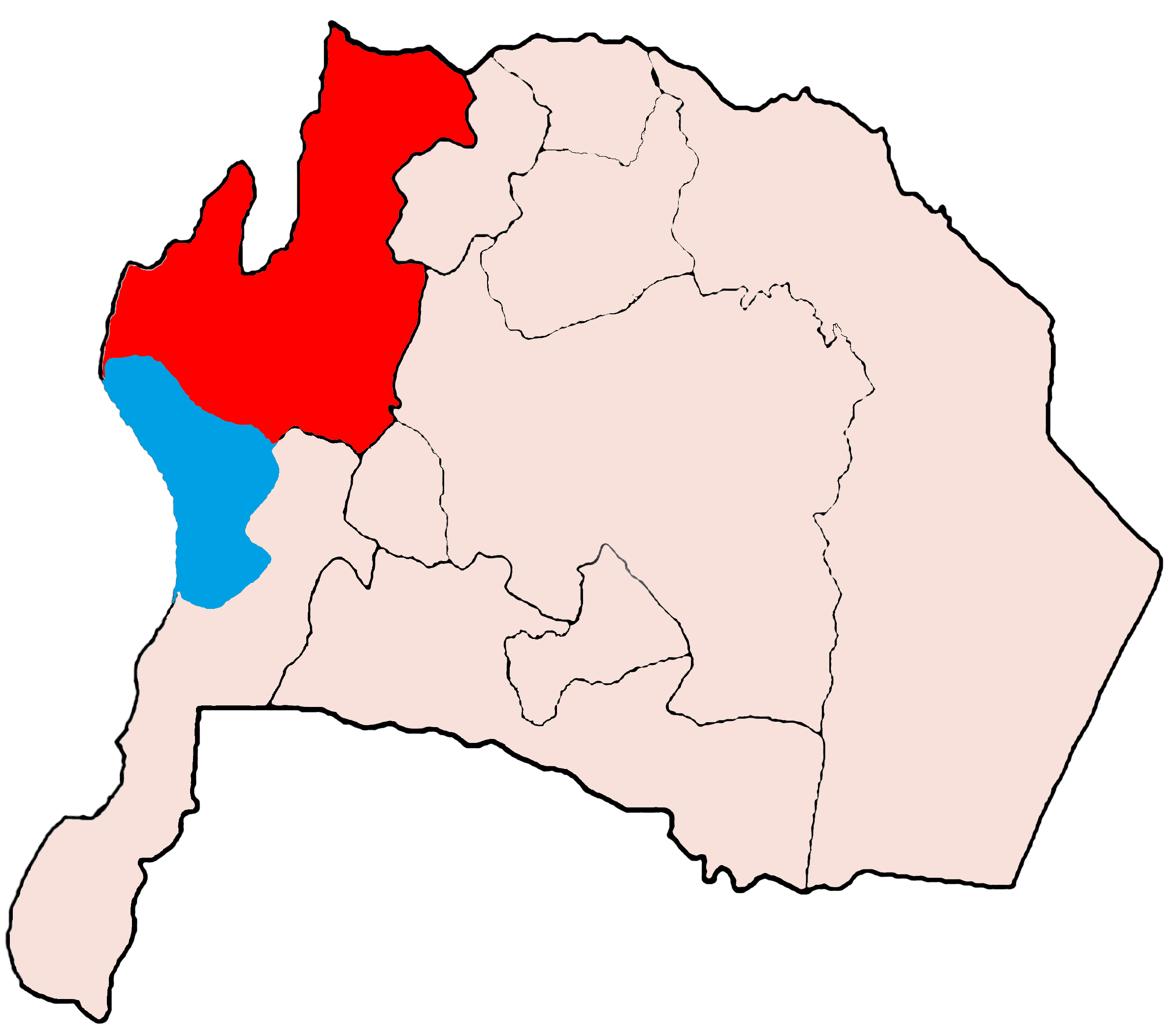
Ghor Al-Mazra'a Department

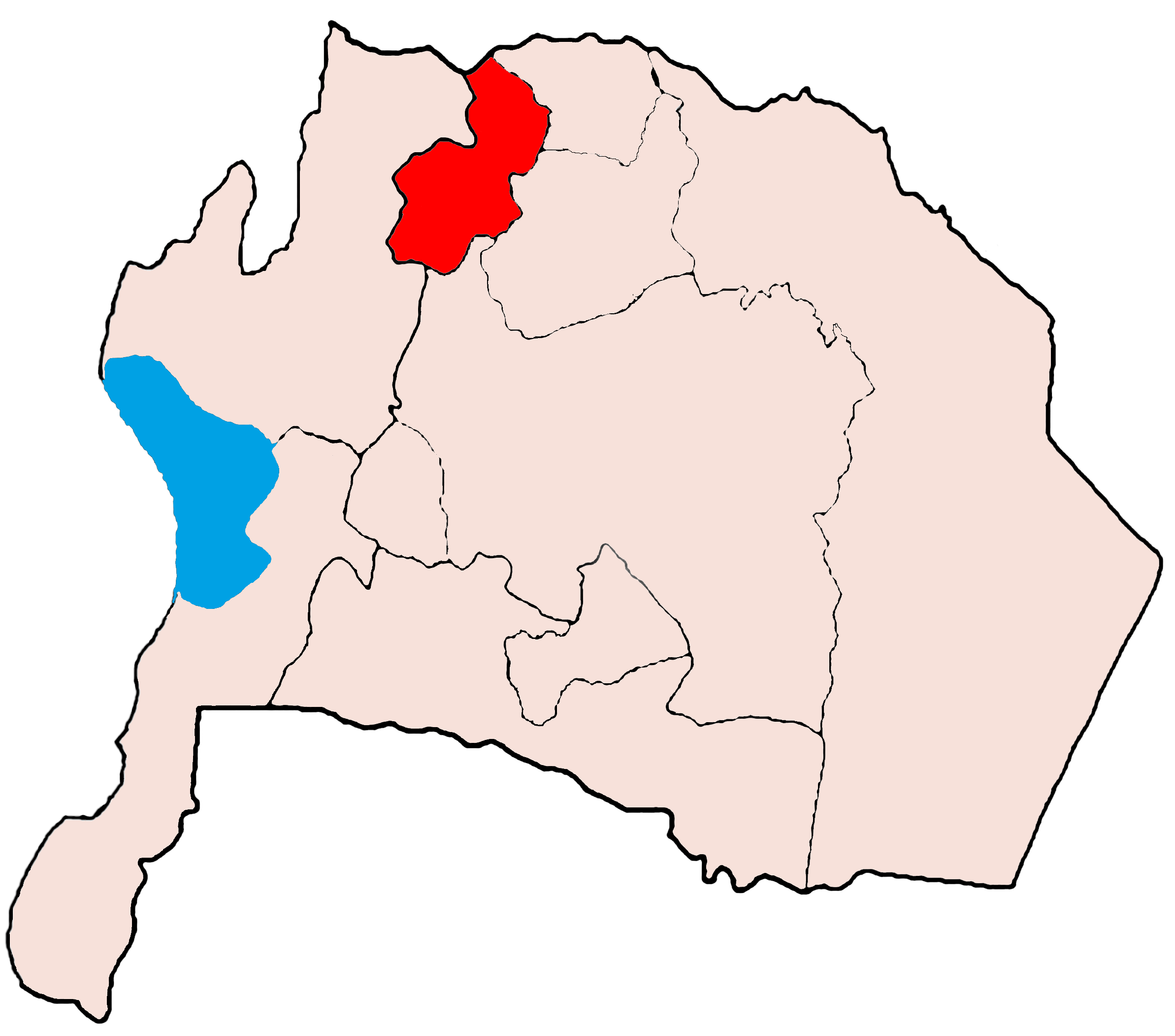
Faqou' Department

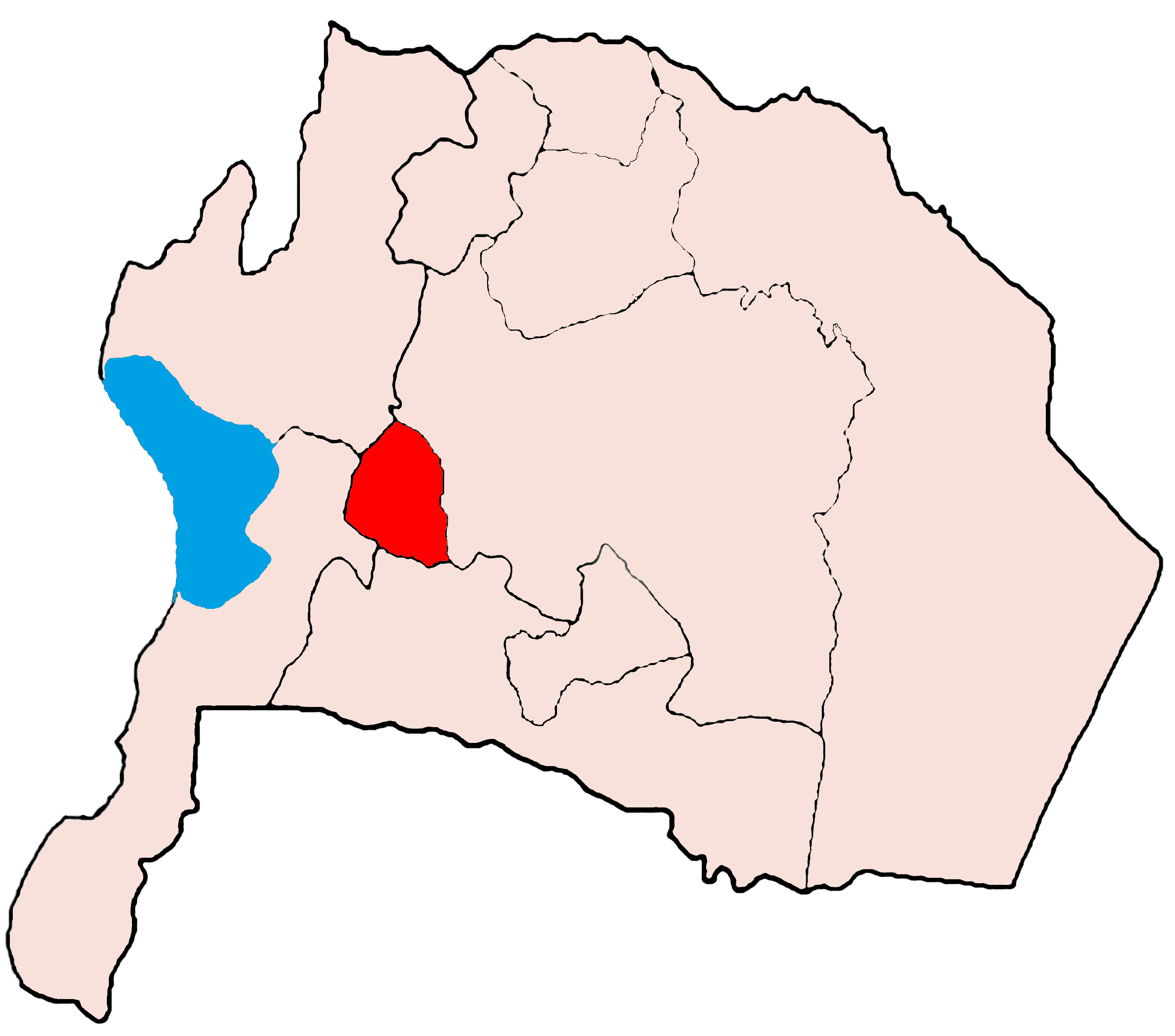
Aii Department

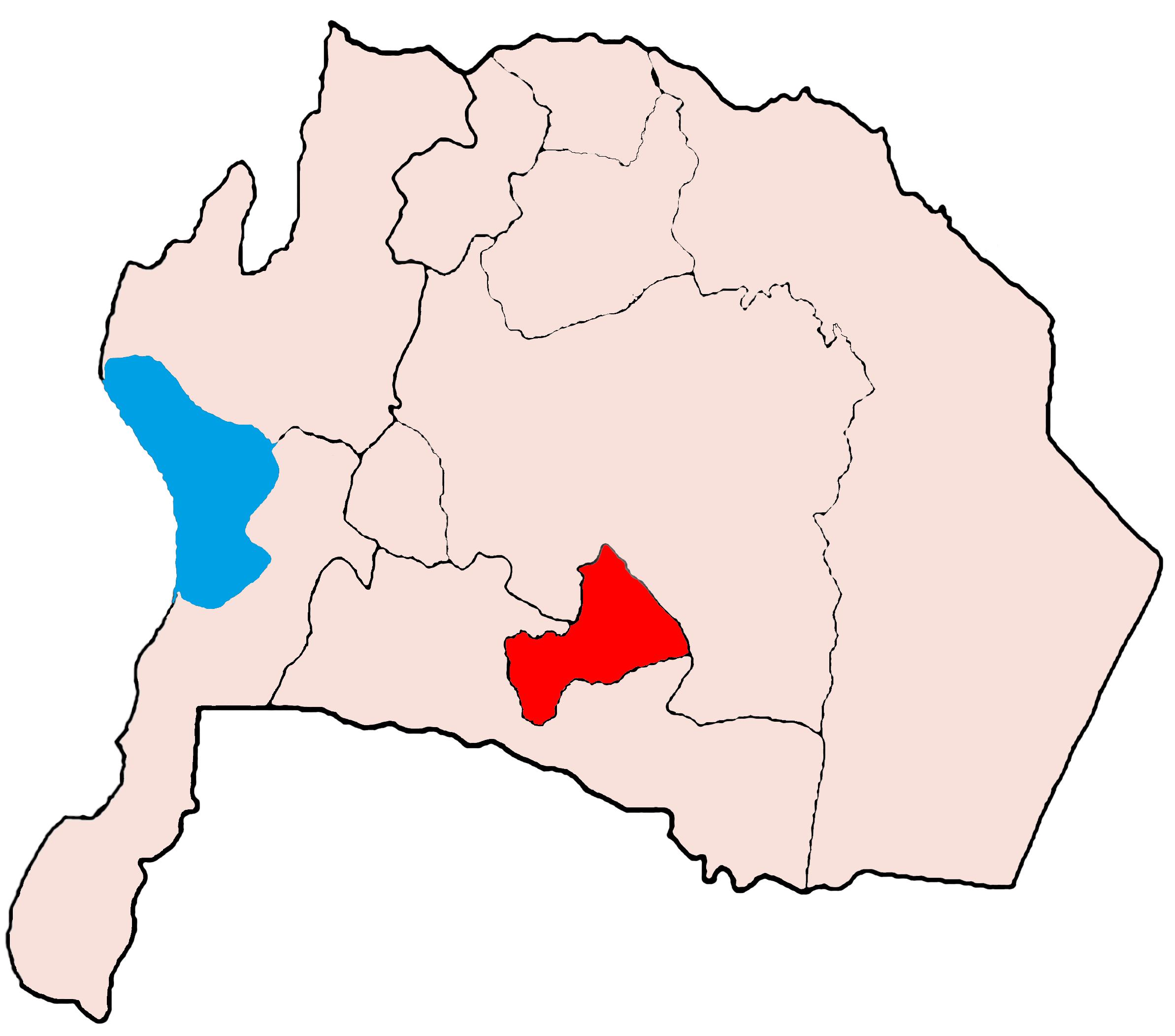
Moab Department

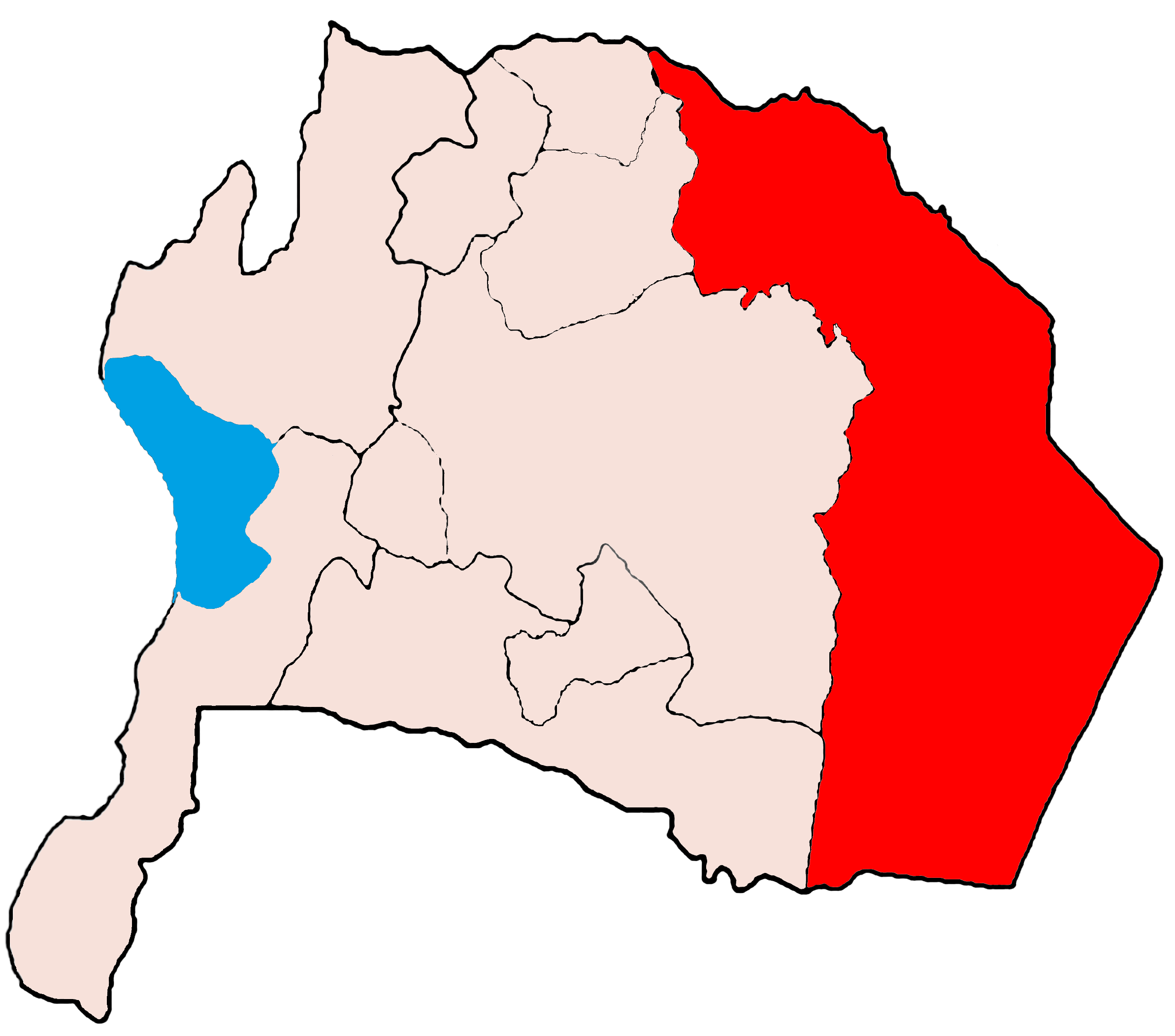
Qatraneh Department

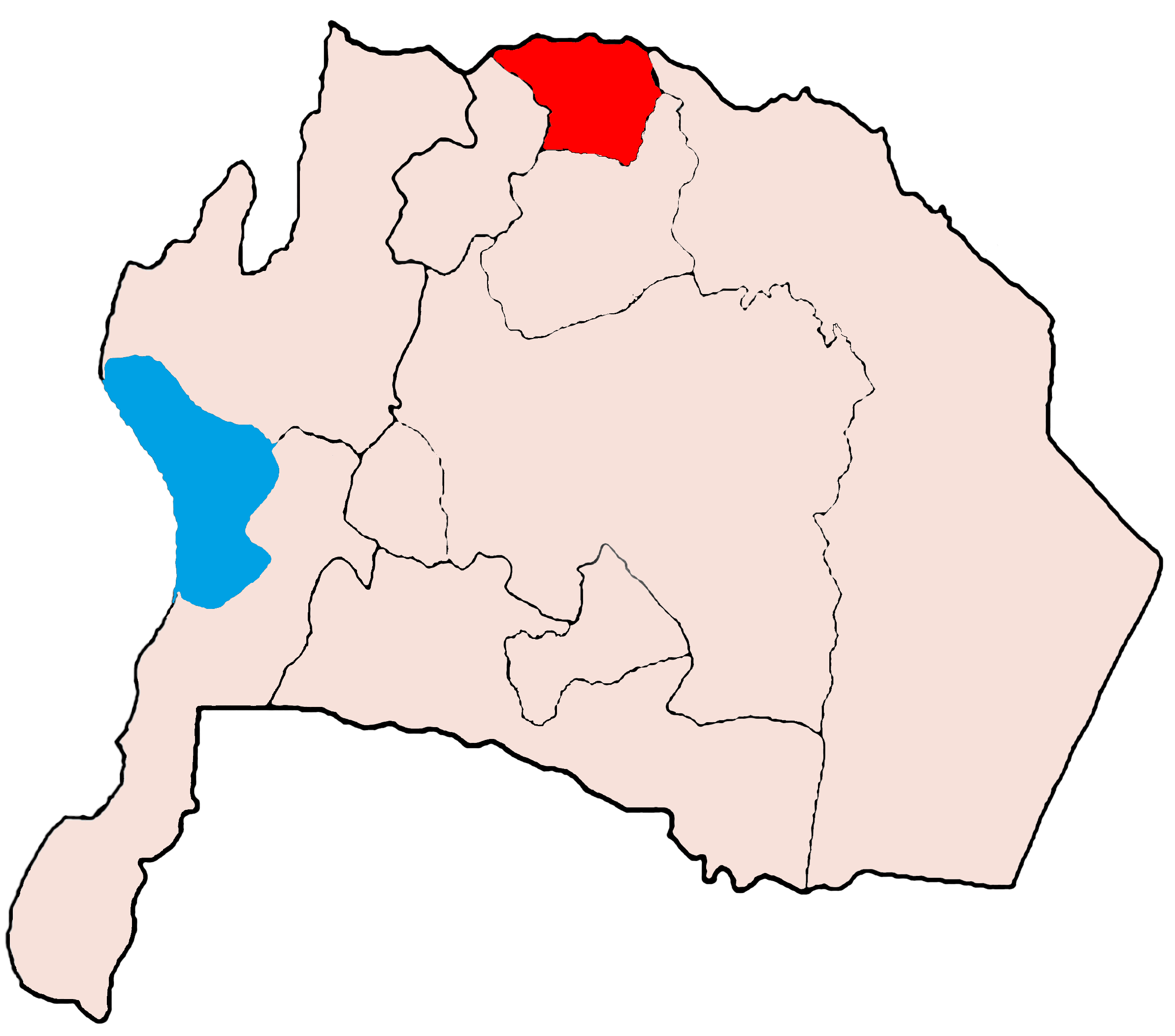
Moujeb Department
