= Hamoud, Karak =

Village in Karak governorate, Jordan

Hamoud حمود
- Populated place
- Interactive map of Hamoud
- Country: Jordan
- Governorate: Karak
- District: Al-Qasr

Population (2015)
  - Total: 284

Hamoud (Note: Also spelled Hammoud, Hmood, Hmoud or Hamud.) (Arabic: حمود) is a village in Al-Qasr, Karak Governorate, Jordan. According to the 2015 Jordanian census, it had a population of 284, comprising 137 males and 147 females living in 72 households.

== Society and landmarks ==
Hamoud is a historic village with a mixed population of Muslims and Christians who have coexisted for centuries. The village features the Saint George Greek Orthodox Church, which was built in 1908 and serves as a key local landmark.

On 23 October 2026, attackers who had pledged allegiance to the Islamic State killed 9 people and injured 34 others during a funeral at a Greek Orthodox church in the village.

== See also ==
- List of cities in Jordan
