= Qatraneh =

Al Qatraneh or Al Qatrana اﻟﻘﻄﺮاﻧﺔ
- Town
- Location in Jordan
- Coordinates: 31°15′13″N 36°02′50″E
- Country: Jordan
- Governorate: Karak Governorate

Government
  - Type: Municipality
  - Mayor: Faisal Alasfar

Population (2015)
  - Total: 7,070
- Time zone: UTC+2 (UTC+2)
  - Summer (DST): UTC+3 (UTC+3)
- Area code: +(962)3

Al Qatraneh or Al Qatrana is a small town in Karak Governorate of Jordan. It is located 90 miles south of the capital Amman.

== History ==
The town is famous for its historic Qasr Al-Qatraneh, which was built in the Ottoman era as a waystation for pilgrims on their way to Hajj.

The modern Qatraneh kaza was created in 1996.

== Geography ==
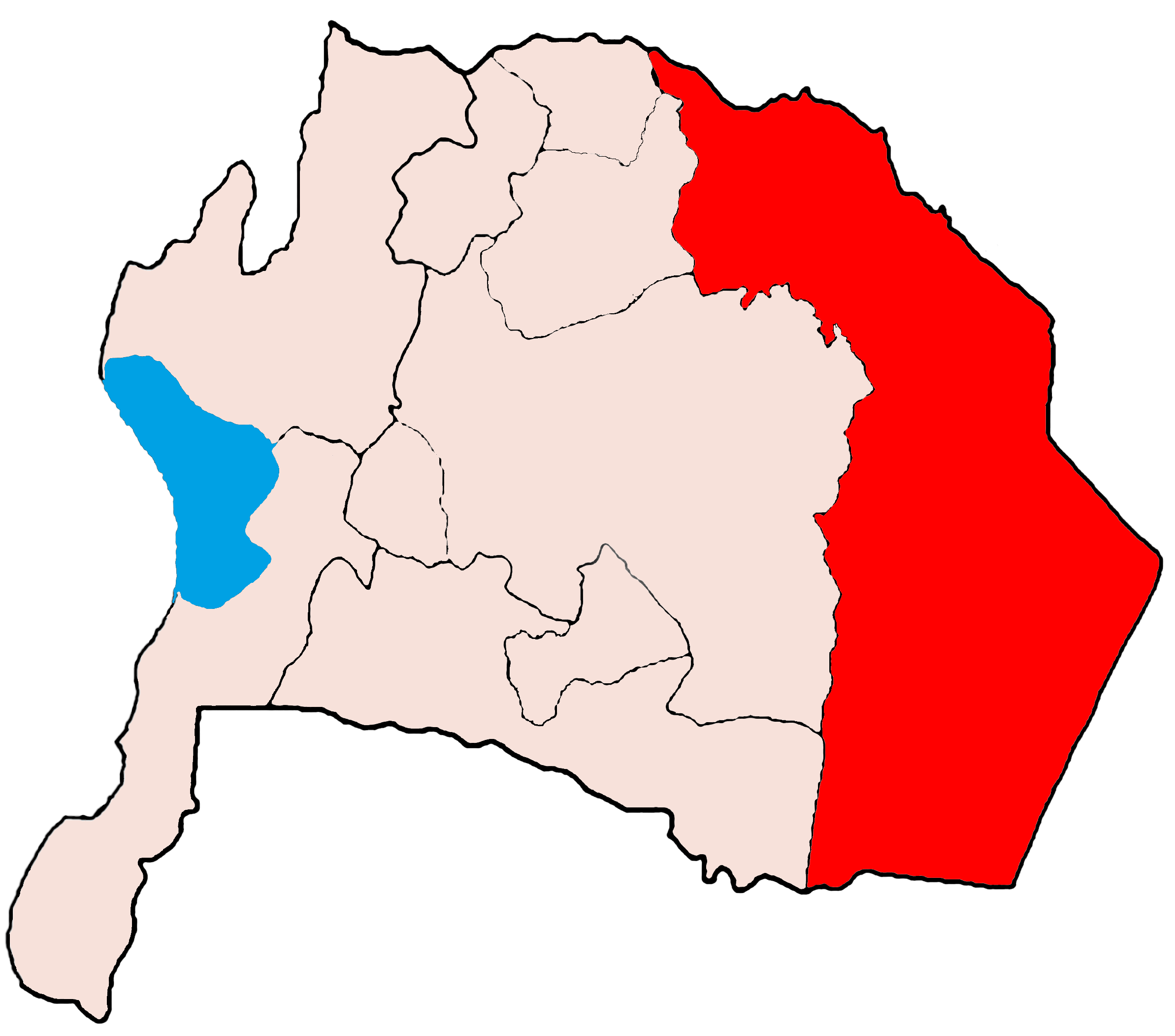
Location of Qatraneh Department of the Karak Governorate

The town lies on the Desert Highway, in the desert plain east of the Mountains of Moab, on the border of Karak and Amman Governorates. The town is located on one of the tributaries of the Mujib River.

== Demographics ==
In the 2004 census, the town had a population of 6,949. The male to female ratio was 51% to 49%. Jordanian citizens made up 95% of the population. The estimated population in 2010 is about 8,300.

== See also ==
- Al-Qatraneh district
- Qatrana Power Plant
- Qasr al-Qatraneh, fortified khan (inn) along the hajj route
