= Al-Qatraneh =

Governorate of Jordan

Al-Qaṭrāneh
- District
- Location within Jordan
- Country: Jordan
- Governorate: Karak

Area
  - Total: 1,063 km^{2} (410 sq mi)

Population (2015 census)
  - Total: 10,896
  - Density: 10.25/km^{2} (26.55/sq mi)
- Time zone: GMT +2
  - Summer (DST): +3

Al-Qaṭrāneh (Arabic: القطرانة) is one of the districts of Karak governorate, Jordan.

== See also ==
- Qatraneh town
- Qatrana Power Plant
- Qasr al-Qatraneh, fortified khan (inn) along the hajj route
