= 2026 Karak church shooting =

Mass shooting in Hamoud, Jordan

- Footage of shooters moving towards the church

- Location within Jordan
- Location: 31°17′22″N 35°47′58″E; Hamoud, Karak Governorate, Jordan
- Date: 23 October 2026; 15:00 (AST, UTC+3)
- Attack type: Mass shooting; mass murder; Islamic terrorism
- Weapons: AK-47; Three handguns
- Deaths: 9
- Injuries: 34
- Perpetrator: Islamic State (suspected)
- Assailants: Hazaa Zidan Thneibat; Mashaal Zidan Thneibat; Ahmad Sami Thneibat
- Motive: Anti-Christian sentiment

On 23 October 2026, three gunmen opened fire during a funeral procession at a church in Hamoud, a village near al-Karak, Jordan. The attack killed nine people and wounded 34 others. The attack is the deadliest on Christian Jordanians in the country's history.

The attackers fired at mourners from outside the Greek Orthodox St George's Church and continued the attack for several minutes. Jordanian security forces subsequently launched a manhunt for the perpetrators, eventually capturing three suspects who had been hiding in an abandoned house in the nearby village of Al-Jadeeda after a three-hour shootout. The three suspects were related Jordanian citizens, of whom was a former Islamic State terror convict that had been released months earlier.

King Abdullah II condemned the shooting as a "terrorist attack", vowed a strong response against those responsible and emphasized national unity, including during a visit to the injured. The government declared three days of national mourning, with flags flown at half-mast across the country. The Karak shooting was considered an unprecedented security incident in Jordan, where major attacks, and especially those targeting Christians, have been extremely rare. The attack prompted international condemnation.

On 26 October, the Royal Jordanian Air Force conducted airstrikes on southern Syria, which allegedly struck Islamic State targets. On 15 November, the Jordanian State Security Court sentenced the three perpetrators to death by hanging.

== Background ==
Karak and its surrounding villages including Hamoud are home to a population of Arab Christian Jordanians. Karak has historically been one of Jordan's principal centers of indigenous Christian life and is known for its longstanding relations between Muslim and Christian communities.

The Christian Science Monitor reported in 2017 that the communities had lived together for generations, with shared tribal customs extending to marriage negotiations, mutual protection and the resolution of disputes. The newspaper quoted Mohammed Maaytah, the Muslim mayor of Adir, describing the communities as deeply interdependent. In 2016, the Italian newspaper La Stampa also documented cooperation between Muslim and Christian medical professionals at Karak's Italian Hospital, which had been operated by Comboni missionaries since 1935.

A previous Islamic State terrorist attack occurred in the Karak Governorate in 2016, when a group of 5 militants killed 14 people and wounded 37 in a series of shootings in the city of Al-Karak.

== Shooting ==
Map of the surrounding area of the shooting

On 23 October 2026, three gunmen arrived by car and opened fire at St George's Church in Hmoud during a funeral procession for a woman from the village. Between 150 and 200 people were inside and around the church at the time.

On CCTV footage verified by the BBC, two of the attackers are seen entering through a vehicle entrance to the church compound, before retreating and returning with a third gunman. All three are armed with handguns, with at least one also carrying an AK-47.

Video footage showed the three gunmen firing towards the church from the sidewalk while hiding behind trees and a wall, before sprinting into the compound. Other footage showed the attackers shooting at a group of men outside the building who were trying to flee. The attackers fired on mourners for several minutes, and footage of the aftermath showed bodies and blood inside the church. Jordanian security forces were deployed across the area and a manhunt began.

The shooting was considered an unprecedented security incident in Jordan, where major attacks, and especially those targeting Christians, have been extremely rare. Although Jordan has experienced major terrorist attacks, including the 2005 Amman hotel bombings and the 2016 Karak attack, its security services have repeatedly foiled attempted attacks by Islamist militant groups.

== Victims ==
Nine people were killed and between 34 and 40 others were wounded, with the figure varying by source and as the count was updated. Two of the wounded were in critical condition. The victims were aged between 23 and 70. Among those killed was Mohammad al-Qasous, a Christian. At least one Muslim mourner was reported among the wounded outside the church.

Following the shooting, the Jordanian Armed Forces arranged the air evacuation of injured victims from Karak to the King Hussein Medical Center in Amman. Eight injured were transported to Amman aboard a Royal Jordanian Air Force helicopter, and three additional patients were transferred to a private hospital.

In an interview with Sky News Arabia, eyewitness William Halaseh, a relative of the woman whose funeral was being held, said that Muslim residents of the village rushed to assist the wounded after the attack. Halaseh emphasized the longstanding coexistence between Muslims and Christians in Karak. Another injured survivor interviewed by Jordanian television station Al-Mamlaka at King Hussein Medical Center said that the wounding of both Muslims and Christians outside the church sent a message about coexistence, and that the attack would strengthen Jordanians' determination to maintain unity.

On 25 October, eight of the victims were buried in Karak in a funeral attended by thousands of mourners, with coffins draped in Jordanian flags amid a heavy security presence.

== Perpetrators ==
According to Jordan's Interior Ministry, a "group of extremists" was behind the attack. Authorities reportedly knew the names of the suspected perpetrators but did not disclose them on the day of the attack.

On 26 October, Jordan named the suspects as three related Jordanian citizens: Hazaa Zidan Thneibat (33), Mashaal Zidan Thneibat (32) and Ahmad Sami Thneibat (31). Haza' was described as the planner and Ahmad as his brother-in-law.

The perpetrators appeared in a video in which they verbally expressed allegiance to the Islamic State. The video was not verified, their connection to the organization was not officially confirmed, and the organization did not claim responsibility for the attack. As of 26 October, authorities had said it was too early to determine whether the men had links to known groups inside or outside Jordan.

One of the three gunmen was a former ISIS convict, having been imprisoned in 2021 for a foiled terror plot, and had been recently released.`

== Aftermath ==
=== Shootout and arrest of suspects ===
According to the Public Security Directorate, joint security forces and commando teams were able to locate the three attackers in an abandoned house in the governorate after an intensive manhunt using reconnaissance, drones and other surveillance equipment. Multiple units were sent to surround the compound and a sniper team was positioned nearby. The attackers were located on the roof by a drone. When ordered to surrender, they refused and proceeded to open fire on the perimeter.

=== Legal proceedings ===
A Jordanian court found the attackers guilty of committing terrorist attacks resulting in death, as well as weapons offences, conspiracy to commit terrorist acts and promoting the ideas of a terrorist organisation. One of the perpetrators was also convicted of providing funds with the intention of using them to finance the commission of terrorist acts. On 15 November, a court sentenced the attackers to death by hanging. The sentences are subject to appeal and automatic review by Jordan's Court of Cassation.

=== Military response ===
On 26 October, the Royal Jordanian Air Force (RJAF) conducted strikes on neighbouring Daraa and Suwayda Governorate in southern Syria against alleged Islamic State positions. The RJAF reported that the strikes killed 20 militants. Jordan claimed that it coordinated the strikes with Syria, the Syrian government denied that any prior coordination occurred and reported that seven civilians were killed in the strikes. Three children and an 80-year-old man were confirmed to be among the civilian fatalities. Jordan acknowledged the killing of civilians.

== Reactions ==
=== Domestic ===
King Abdullah II condemned the shooting as a terrorist attack, vowed a strong response against the perpetrators, and emphasized Jordan's national unity. He also expressed condolences to the victims' families and wished the injured a speedy recovery. Abdullah added in a tweet on X that "The blood of every Jordanian is precious, and we will strike with an iron fist anyone who dares to harm this country."

The day of the attack, Abdullah visited injured survivors at Prince Ali bin Al-Hussein Military Hospital and Karak Governmental Hospital. He appeared wearing a field uniform associated with the Jordanian Special Operations Forces, with a pistol and ammunition pouches visible on his equipment. During the visit, he checked on the injured and received accounts of their experiences following the attack. He vowed that those responsible would face severe punishment, declaring that the attack would not undermine national unity. Abdullah told one of the survivors: "We'll show them".

Prime Minister Jafar Hassan, accompanied by several officials including the interior minister, police director, and intelligence chief, visited the Hamoud Charitable Society in the village to convey his condolences to the victims, who were called "martyrs" by the Jordan News Agency. Hassan mentioned that efforts were underway to pursue the perpetrators and bring them to justice. The Jordanian government declared three days of national mourning beginning on 23 October 2026, with flags flown at half-mast across government buildings and public institutions.

On the evening of the attack, a solidarity vigil was held outside an Orthodox church complex in the Sweifieh area of Amman. The gathering brought together Muslim and Christian religious leaders, government officials, lawmakers, political representatives, youth organizations, and tribal leaders, who condemned the attack and expressed solidarity with the victims and their families. Participants waved Jordanian flags, lit candles and offered prayers for those killed and injured.

Catholic leaders in Jordan and neighbouring countries also expressed solidarity. In a statement sent to pontifical foundation Aid to the Church in Need, Jordanian priest Rif'at Bader said the whole country was in a state of "grief, shock and disbelief", and Fr Louis Salmaan said that “Christian forgiveness does not mean surrendering our rights or compromising justice. They demand full accountability, as Christian blood must never be shed with impunity.”

=== International ===
The attack was met with condemnation internationally, including officials from Chile, Cyprus, Greece, Egypt, Indonesia, Iraq, Israel, Lebanon, Malaysia, Oman, Pakistan, Palestine, Poland, Qatar, Saudi Arabia, Singapore, Syria, Timor-Leste, the United Arab Emirates, and the United States. Religious formations including the Greek Orthodox Patriarchate of Jerusalem also condemned the attack. The Higher Presidential Committee for Church Affairs in Palestine called on churches across Palestine to ring their bells in solidarity with Jordan and the victims of the attack, and announced a solidarity vigil in Manger Square in Bethlehem to honor those killed and express solidarity with their families.

The Latin Patriarchate of Jerusalem, which oversees the Latin rite Catholic Church in Jordan, criticised what it called a "cowardly terrorist attack”, expressing hope that "this ordeal serves as an occasion to renew our commitment to national unity and coexistence – standing united as one against any who would seek to undermine the security of our homeland or compromise its unity."

== See also ==
- Christianity in Jordan
- 2024 Istanbul church shooting
- Mar Elias Church attack, 2025 terrorist attack in Damascus, Syria
- 2026 Amman stabbing attack
