= Xenel =

Company based in Jeddah

- Type: Private
- Industry: Conglomerate
- Founded: 1973; 53 years ago
- Headquarters: Jeddah, Saudi Arabia
- Key people: Khalid Alireza (CEO)
- Net income: $100M
- Owner: Alireza Family
- Website: Xenel

Xenel is a diversified company based in Jeddah, Saudi Arabia. Founded in 1973 by the descendants of one of the oldest trading houses in the Middle East. House of Alireza, Xenel - a spelling variation for family patriarch, the late Zainal Alireza - grew by establishing multiple joint ventures with international companies and in the process building its own expertise in energy, petrochemicals, construction, infrastructure development, healthcare, industrial services, information technologies, logistics, real estate and global investing. Khalid Alireza is the CEO of the Group.

== Group Companies ==
=== Heavy Industries ===
1. Saudi Cable Company (SCC)
2. Hidada Group

=== Health Care ===
1. AMI
2. Imdad Medical Business Co. Ltd. is headquartered in Riyadh and has branches in Jeddah and Al-Khobar, and it has been working in the field of aesthetic medicine since 1991.

=== Transport, Logistics & Building Materials ===
1. Arabian Bulk Trade Limited (ABT)
2. Binex
3. Saudi Bulk Transport Limited (SBT)
4. Saudi Scaffolding Factory (SSF)
5. The International Company for Chemicals (ICC)

=== Agriculture Commodities ===
1. Agri Bulk Trade

=== Industrial Services ===
1. Saudi Miebach
2. Arabian Services Group
3. SSOC Trican
4. AECOM Arabia
5. Karam Fedics Services Company Ltd.
6. Al-Karam Al-Arabi

=== Real Estate ===
1. Tamlik Properties
2. Xentury City

== See also ==
- Alkaffary Group
- Sipchem
