= Alkaffary Group =

Saudi Arabian company

- Type: Corporation
- Industry: Retail, Home Furnishing, Flooring
- Founded: 1951
- Founder: Saleh Alkaffary
- Headquarters: Riyadh, Saudi Arabia
- Number of locations: Qassim, Jeddah, Mecca, Medina, Dammam, Khobar, Al-Ahsa, Tabuk, Hafr Al-Batin, Hail, Jazan, Abha, Khamis Mushait, Riyadh, Taif, Abha
- Area served: Saudi Arabia
- Key people: Saleh Alkaffary (Owner)
- Products: Carpets, Furniture, Flooring
- Number of employees: more than 1500
- Website: kaffary.com

Alkaffary Group is a company based in Saudi Arabia, specializing in carpets, flooring, furniture, and interior decorative products. As of 2024, Alkaffary Group operates more than 70 stores, outlets, and online stores, across Saudi Arabia.

== History ==
Alkaffary Group was founded by Abdulrahman Nasser Alkaffary in 1951, as a small store in Riyadh that sold traditional carpets (known as "Zal").

In the following years, Alkaffary Group expanded into multiple areas, including the launch of High Point Furniture in 2005, followed by Alkaffary Flooring, and Alkaffary Projects.

Saleh Abdulrahman Alkaffary, the founder's son, then expanded the business into a larger company, diversifying it into various sectors, including furniture, flooring, and home decor.

In 2009, the Minister of Commerce and Industry of Saudi Arabia, Hassan bin Ahmed Zainal Ali Reda, approved the amendment of License No. (257/Q), formally establishing Alkaffary Group Company as a closed joint-stock company. The company's capital was set at 5 million Saudi Riyals, divided into 500,000 shares, each with a nominal value of 10 Riyals.

Today, the group is recognized as one of the leading brands in the Middle East for home design and decor.

== Products ==
Alkaffary Group operates the following brands:

- Alkaffary Carpet offers a wide range of rugs and carpets, along with installation services. It is one of the largest rug providers in the Middle East.
- High Point supplies furniture for residential and office use, with a focus on simple and stylish designs.
- Alkaffary Parquet offers parquet flooring from Germany, Belgium, and China, renowned for their ease of installation and resistance to scratches.
- Alkaffary Projects works on large-scale commercial and institutional projects, including supplying carpets for mosques and custom flooring solutions.
