= 'Ayy =

District in Karak Governorate of Jordan

- District
- Location within Jordan
- Coordinates: 31°08′42″N 35°35′38″E
- Country: Jordan
- Governorate: Karak
- Time zone: GMT +2
  - Summer (DST): +3

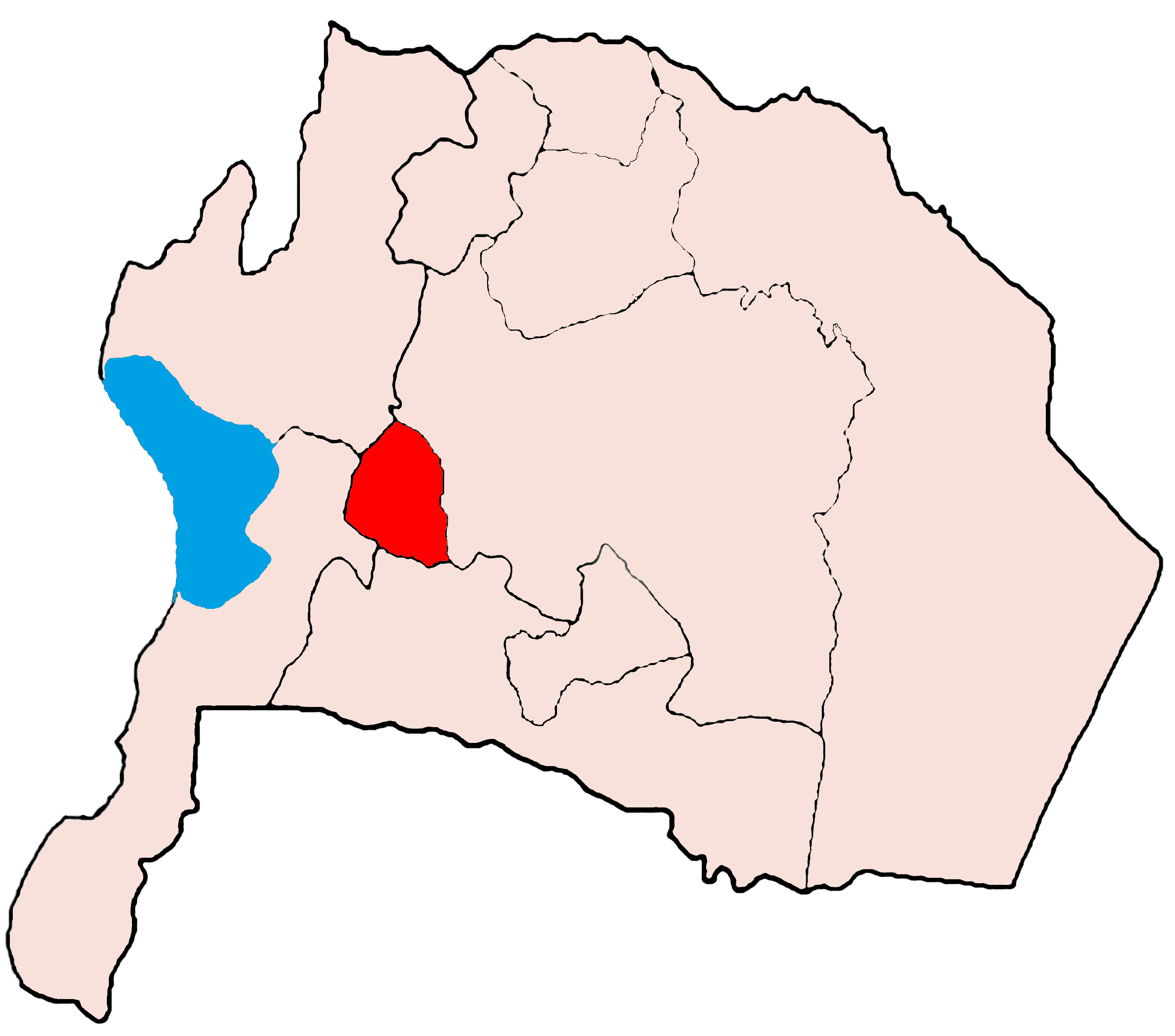
Map of Aii within Karak

'Ayy is one of the districts of Karak governorate, Jordan.
