= Qaṣabah al-Karak =

Governorate of Jordan

- District
- Location within Jordan
- Coordinates: 31.16121°N 35.82527°E
- Country: Jordan
- Governorate: Karak

Area
  - Total: 765.8 km^{2} (295.7 sq mi)

Population (2015 census)
  - Total: 101,377
  - Density: 132.4/km^{2} (342.9/sq mi)
- Time zone: GMT +2
  - Summer (DST): +3

Qaṣabah al-Karak is one of the districts of Karak governorate, Jordan.
