= Qasr al-Qatraneh =

Coordinates: 31°14′30″N 36°2′22″E

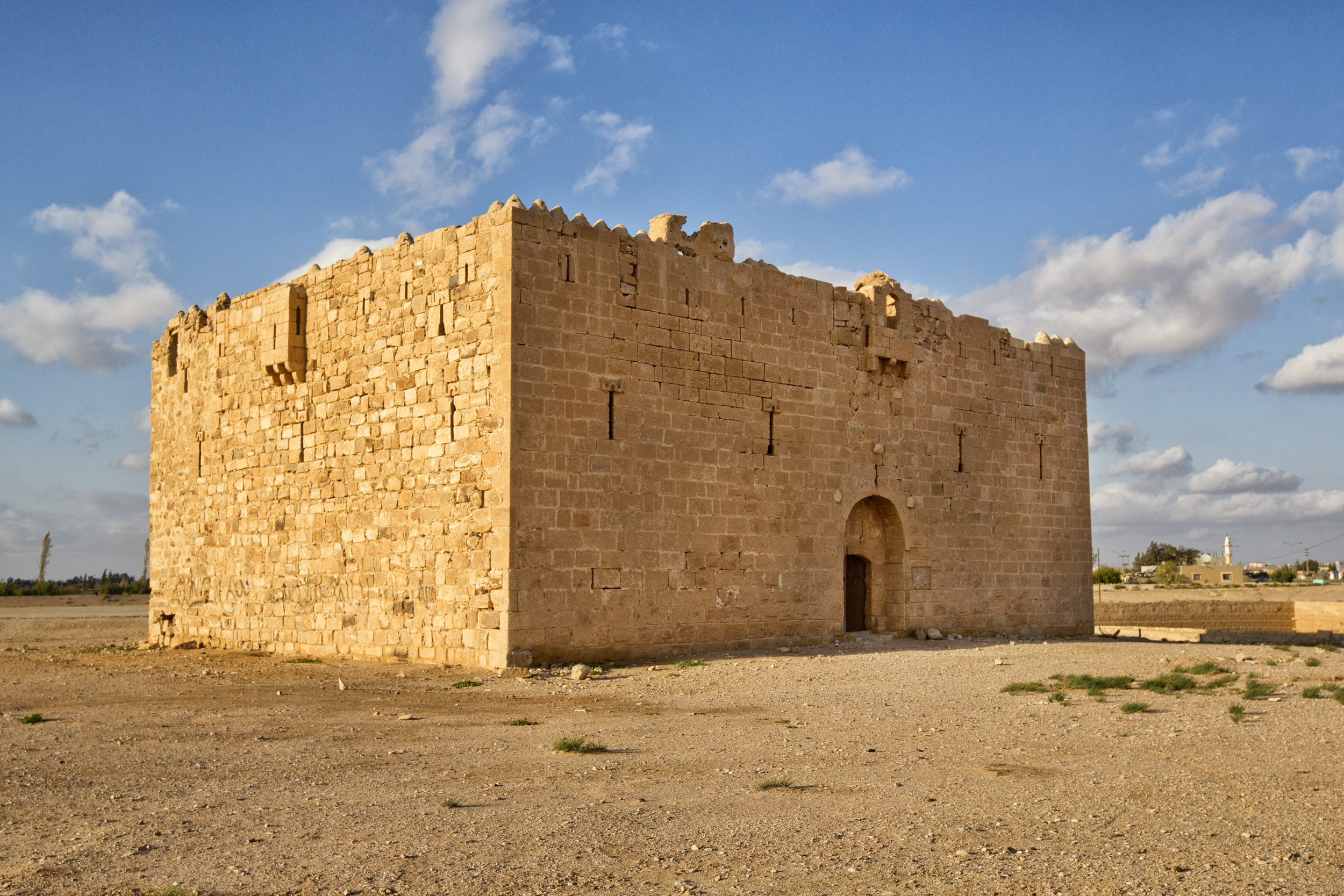
Qatrana, (c) Bashar Tabbah, Jordan

Qasr al-Qatraneh (Arabic: قلعة القطرانة; alternatively: "Qatraneh" or "Qatrana Castle," "Fortress Qatrana," or "Khan Qatraneh") is an Ottoman structure which largely served to provide water and protection on the Syrian pilgrimage route between the Levant and the Gulf. It is located in modern-day Jordan, just off the country's Desert Highway, approximately 90 kilometres south of Amman and northwest of the town of Qatraneh. It is one of at least ten khans that have been identified and documented along the Syrian pilgrimage route in Jordan.

== History ==
=== Pre-Ottoman origins ===
In spite of Qatraneh being attributed to the Ottoman period, the testimony of medieval historical sources indicates previous existence, followed by re-building under the Ottomans; the earliest reference is from Ibn Habib al-Halabi (1310-1377). As noted by archaeologist Reem Samed Al Shqour, ancient khans and their courtyard fortifications were obvious models upon which later peoples could build (literally and metaphorically). Shqour writes: "The basic layout known as the courtyard fortification pattern can be traced back as early as the Late Bronze and Iron Age structures in Jordan...Undoubtedly, the durability and survivability of these structures meant that succeeding polities were well aware of the existence and advantages...if not in possessing, rebuilding, and utilizing the older, original structures, then in using them as models for new building designed along the same of similar plan."

=== Ottoman period ===
Qasr al-Qatraneh in 2026

Historical texts confirm that it was a hostel in AH 926/1520 CE, when a Shami caravan returned from the Hajj, and pilgrims stayed in the al-Hasa region.

The building is typically credited to the reign of Sultan Sulayman I in the year 1531. The sultan provided funds to clean the pool.

There are two phases at the site (followed by restoration work done by the Jordanian Department of Antiquities in the 1970s): the original building, including the first row of arrowslits and crenellations, followed in the 18th century by the addition of box machicolations. A photograph from the 19th century indicates that at least one of the second-story roofs may have been a hemispherical dome, suggesting possible use of the structure as a mosque.

=== Purpose ===
One of the primary functions of the fort would have been for defense, as it would have been for similar, more ancient structures. However, Shqour notes that Islamic presence in the region left a "unique Islamic stamp on the form of the qusur" (pl. of qasr; castles, forts) and there are records of multiple functions for Castle Qatrana. It seems that such forts served as dwelling places, trade centers, storehouses for pilgrims, and, perhaps uniquely in the case of Qatrana, as a rudimentary postal office in the 19th century.

== Water system ==
=== Background ===
The residents that lived in the region during the Byzantine and Roman periods developed a system to bring water from vast, extensive terrain to the cities, towns, and villages and their buildings. The system is what we would now call a watershed. The studies performed by the Department of Antiquities in the al-Qatraneh region reveal that they made channels to make water flow from the region of Wadi al-Hasa to the other nearby wadis and the nearby lake. The urgent need for the daily use of water and other uses has been the driver of the creation and design of these prominent water systems.

=== Qatraneh's water system ===
The water facility provided the residents with clean water for drinking, irrigation, and livestock.

South of the castle runs Wadi Hanifa, oriented southeast to west, and Wadi Hafira, which converges with Wadi Hanifa. They were the water source for Qatraneh's water system.

There is a dam at 75 metres from the castle, 38 metres high, 6.6 metres wide and 2.4 metres deep. The two connecting channels are each 105 cm in diametre, and 90 cm from each other. The two channels lead the water to a settling basin, then to a large pool where it was collected, and from there the water flowed to a well located inside the castle. The main pond is at a distance of 26 metres from the castle and measures 70 X 70 metres, at a depth of 5.2 metres.

A rock channel was discovered, which was used to transfer water to the pond. What remains of these foundational stones discovered on the site near the valley demonstrates a high degree of mastery in construction and design.

== Description ==
The fort/castle is a three-story structure of basalt and limestone, with a large reservoir (70m by 70m) that collects water using the proximity to nearby wadis (valleys).

The castle is a rectangular building, 22.2 metres long, 17.35 wide, and c. 10 to 10.5 metres high. The walls of the castle were built of polished stones, and the palace from clay and limestone tiles, as was common in the region during the Mamluk period.

The gate is on the eastern facade, about 3 metres tall, and has dimensions of 185 cm × 140 cm and a thickness of 35 cm. The door opens in a semi-circle, and is decorated. There is a prominent balcony atop the gate, overlooking the road from the castle. This mashrabiya is used to surveil prisoners and to fortify the entrance, which leads to a small lobby, and opposing vaults that lead to a courtyard. On both floors are corridors with semi-cylindrical and opposing vaults, and a stairway to the floor above. The prisoners draw water from the well in the center of the castle, and to the east of the castle, two adjacent ponds collect rainwater, for travellers and pilgrims to drink.

== Raids and massacres ==
Sources show that the castle was attacked and everybody in it was killed in the Hajj season of AH 1139 / 1726 CE. The castle's fame explains that it was vulnerable to raids, looting, and pillaging, especially in the hajj season of 1699.

== Historical sources ==
"The caravan reached the blessed manzil al-Qatrana. The manzil is located in a wide wadi and has a great qal'a next to it. The gate was closed. People lived there (the owners) and they sell pilgrims hay and other provisions by lowering it from the top of the qal'a. Next to the qal'a is a large pool; and next to it is a smaller one, which filters water before it reaches the large one." —Al-Khiyari, in Rihlat al-Khiyari: Tuhfat' al-Udaba wa-Salwat al-Ghuraba

Figures in history who mention Qatrana explicitly in their writings are here listed in chronological order, from the 16th–late 19th centuries:

- historian Abd-al-Qadir ibn Muhammed al-Ansari al-Jaziri al-Hanbali (AH 911–977)
- Mustapha Pasha
- Najm al-Din Muhammad ibn Muhammad al-Ghazzi
- al-Hassan Bin Muhammad Al-Biruni
- Katib Çelebi
- Mohammed bin Abd Allah al-Husseini al-Mawsawi Kibrit
- Kadri
- Ibrahim bin Abdul Rahman Al-Khiyari Almadni
- Evliya Çelebi
- Ibn Elwan
- al-Nabulusi
- Abdallah Ibn Husain Imad Abd as-Salam Rauf al-Swaydi
- Edib Mehmed
- Abu al-Qasim ibn Ahmad ibn Ali ibn Ibrahim al-Zayani
- Al-Miknasi
- Johan Lewis Burckhardt
- Muhammad Ali Pasha
- John Edward Gray Hill (from "A Journey to Petra, 1896")
- Muhammad ibn Uthman Sanusi
- Charles Montagu Doughty
- Miz Ughli.

== Conservation ==
Efforts to restore and conserve the site are ongoing in the face of recent "sabotage," "vandalism," and unofficial excavations. These efforts include reinforcement of walls, partial reconstruction (of missing stones), the creation of a tourist path, site documentation, preparation of an action plan, and local job creation.

The Jordanian Department of Antiquities cooperated with the Turkish government to do the necessary restoration.

== See also ==
Archaeological sites in the Karak Governorate:

- Kerak Castle
- Numeira
- List of castles in Jordan
