= Al-Qasr, Karak =

Governorate of Jordan

Al-Qasr
- District
- Location within Jordan
- Country: Jordan
- Governorate: Karak

Area
  - Total: 242.9 km^{2} (93.8 sq mi)

Population (2015 census)
  - Total: 29,407
  - Density: 121.1/km^{2} (313.6/sq mi)
- Time zone: GMT +2
  - Summer (DST): +3

Al-Qasr (Arabic: القصر, romanized: Al-Qaṣr) is one of the districts of Karak governorate, Jordan.

== See also ==
Hmood
