= Faqū'e =

Governorate of Jordan

Faqū'e فقوع
- District
- Interactive map of Faqū'e
- Country: Jordan
- Governorate: Karak

Area
  - Total: 102.0 km^{2} (39.4 sq mi)

Population (2015 census)
  - Total: 16,806
  - Density: 164.8/km^{2} (426.7/sq mi)
- Time zone: GMT +2
  - Summer (DST): +3

Faqū'e is one of the districts of Karak governorate, Jordan.

== Landmarks ==
The Kerak castle in Al-Karak city was a stronghold during the Crusades.
