= Al-Āghwār al-Janūbī =

Governorate of Jordan

- District
- Location within Jordan
- Country: Jordan
- Governorate: Karak

Area
  - Total: 770.9 km^{2} (297.6 sq mi)

Population (2015 census)
  - Total: 54,867
  - Density: 71.17/km^{2} (184.3/sq mi)
- Time zone: GMT +2
  - Summer (DST): +3

Al-Āghwār al-Janūbī (Arabic: لواء الأغوار الجنوبية, lit. 'Southern Jordan Valley') is one of the districts of Karak governorate, Jordan.
