= 2026 Amman stabbing =

2026 Stabbing attack in Jordan

- Location: Amman, Jordan
- Date: November 5, 2026
- Attack type: Stabbing
- Deaths: 1
- Injuries: 2 (Including the attacker)
- Accused: Muhannad al-Hamouri

On November 5, 2026, a stabbing occurred near the Sri Lankan Embassy in Amman, Jordan, resulting in the death of a Public Security Directorate Corporal and the wounding of a second officer.

== Background ==
The alleged perpetrator Muhannad al-Hamouri (born 1994) had been previously incarcerated since 2022 in Jordan for attempting to join the Islamic State's Sinai Province and plotting an attack on an unnamed Jordanian security compound, being sentenced to nine years in prison but released in October 2026 for provisional reasons.

Almost two weeks prior to the stabbing, an ISIS-inspired mass shooting occurred in Karak, the first terrorist incident to occur in Jordan since 2016.

== Attack ==
At 12:20 p.m. (UTC+3), an assailant armed with multiple daggers approached two Public Security Directorate officers stationed at the Sri Lankan Embassy on Madina Munawara Street and fatally struck one with a knife, proceeding to then attack the nearby second officer, striking him multiple times in the face. A struggle then ensued between the assailant and officer resulting in both sustaining heavy injuries.

A nearby security patrol then arrived at the scene, disarming the assailant and placing him under arrest whilst in critical condition, later transporting him to Dar Al Salam Hospital.

== Investigation ==
Immediately after the attack the State Security Court announced it had initiated an investigation into the assailant, finalizing its investigatory findings on November 11, 2026.

Prosecutors publicly named the accused suspect on November 6, formally charging him on November 11th under Jordan's Anti-Terrorism Law No. 55 of 2006.
