= Zureikat =

Zureikat (Arabic: زريقات), also spelled as Zureiqat, Zurayqat, Zareigat, Zuraiqat, Zreigat, and Zreiqat, is a surname and an Arab clan. The clan spread from Al-Karak, with multiple sub-clans of the same name emerging. The clan was Greek Orthodox Christian. The name is said to have come from them having blue eyes, and their origins have been attributed to Damascus. Notable people with the surname include:

- Fawaz Zureikat, Jordanian businessman
- Hala Zreiqat, Jordanian biomechanical engineer
- Harran Zureikat, American football player
- Mohammad Zureiqat (born 1991), Jordanian footballer
