= Farooq =

Farooq فاروق
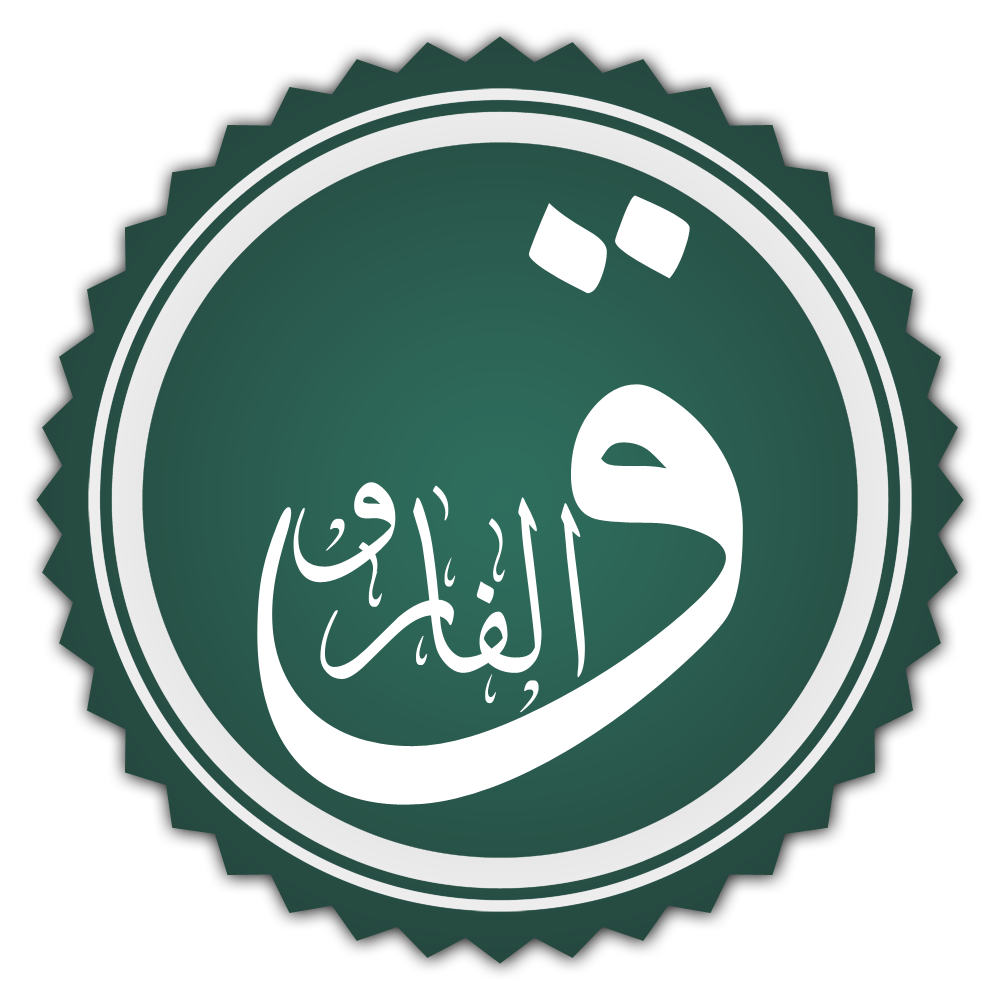
- Calligraphic representation of Al-Farooq
- Pronunciation: Literary Arabic: [fɑːˈruːq, faːˈruːq, fæːˈruːq] Egyptian Arabic: [fɑˈɾuːʔ] Levantine Arabic: [faːˈruːʔ] Persian: [fɒːˈɾuːɣ] English: /fɑːˈruːk/
- Gender: Male

Origin
- Language: Arabic
- Meaning: The one who distinguishes between right and wrong

Other names
- Variant form: Farooqui

Farooq (also transliterated as Farouk, Farook, Faruk, Faroeq, Faruq, or Farouq or Faruque; Arabic: فاروق, romanized: Fārūq) is a common Arabic given and family name. Al-Fārūq literally means "the one who distinguishes between right and wrong."

== Given name ==
=== Farouk ===
- Farouk of Egypt (1920–1965), King of Egypt and the Sudan
- Farouk El-Baz (born 1938), scientist
- Farouk Hosny (born 1938), painter
- Farouk Janeman (1953–2013), Fijian athlete
- Farouk Kaddoumi (1931–2024), Palestinian leader
- Farouk Kamoun (born 1946), Tunisian scientist
- Farouk Lawan (born 1962), Nigerian politician
- Farouk Ruzimatov, Russian ballet dancer
- Farouk Seif Al Nasr (1922–2009), Egyptian politician
- Farouk Shami, Palestinian-American businessman
- Farouk al-Sharaa (born 1938), Syrian politician
- Farouk Tebbal, Algerian politician

=== Farouq ===
- Farouq Farkhan (born 1988), Singaporean footballer
- Farouq Limouri (born 2003), Dutch-Moroccan footballer
- Farouq Qasrawi (1942–2021), former Jordanian Minister of Foreign Affairs
- Farouq Molloy (born 1957), British artist

=== Farooq ===
- Farooq Abdullah (born 1937), Indian politician
- Farooq Hamid (1945–2025), Pakistani cricketer
- Farooq Kathwari (born 1944), United States businessman
- Farooq Kperogi (born 1973), Nigerian academic
- Farooq Leghari (1940–2010), eighth President of Pakistan from November 14, 1993, until December 2, 1997
- Farooq Mughal, American politician from Georgia
- Farooq Naek (born 1950), Pakistani lawyer
- Farooq Sheikh (1948–2013), Indian actor
- Farooq Shah (born 1985), Pakistani footballer
- Faarooq (born 1958), ring name of professional wrestler Ron Simmons (born 1958)
- Farooque (1948–2023), Bangladeshi actor

=== Faruq ===
- Faruq Z. Bey (1942–2012), American jazz saxophonist

=== Faruk ===
- Faruk Çelik (born 1956), Turkish politician
- Faruk Cömert (born 1946), Turkish military officer
- Faruk Gül, Turkish and American economist and academic
- Faruk Fatih Özer (1993/94–2025), Turkish cryptocurrency trader and convicted fraudster
- Faruk Šehić (born 1970), Bosnian poet
- Faruk Sükan (1921–2005), Turkish physician and politician
- Faruk Süren (born 1945), Turkish businessman
- Faruk Türünz (born 1944), Turkish luthier
- Faruk Yiğit (born 1968), Turkish footballer

== Surname ==
=== Farouk ===
- Bakhtier Farouk, engineer and published author
- El Amry Farouk (1970–2024), Egyptian businessman and politician
- Nabil Farouk (1956–2020), Egyptian novelist

=== Farouq ===
- Sadiya Umar Farouq (born 1974), Nigerian politician
- Naureen Farouq Ibrahim, Pakistani politician

=== Farook ===
- Hunais Farook (born 1973), a Sri Lankan politician
- Syed Rizwan Farook (1987–2015), a perpetrator of the 2015 San Bernardino attack

=== Farooq ===
- Jalil Farooq (born 2001), American football player
- Mohammad Farooq or Muhammad Farooq, several people
  - Mohammad Farooq (cricketer, born 1938) (born 1938), Pakistani cricketer
  - Muhammad Farooq Khan (1956–2010), Pakistani psychiatrist
- Mir Waiz Umar Farooq (born 1973), Kashmiri separatist leader.
- Ravee Farooq (born 1982), Maldivian actor, director, editor and choreographer

=== Faruk ===
- Dudu Faruk (born 1996), Israeli rapper, actor and singer

== See also ==
- Al-Farooq (disambiguation)
- Farooqui
- Farook College, Calicut
