= Al-Farooq =

Al-Farooq (also spelled El-Farouk, Al Farouk or Al-Faruq) may refer to:

== People ==
- Umar, Muslim caliph and companion of Muhammad, known as Al-Faruq ("Distinguisher between truth and false")
- Farooqi and Farooq, surnames
- Al-Farouq Aminu, American basketball player for the Portland Trail Blazers
- El-Farouk Khaki, Canadian lawyer
- Omar al-Faruq (1971–2006), Al-Qaeda member
- Farouk of Egypt

== Places ==
- Al Farouk de Tombouctou, football (soccer) team in Mali
- Al Faruq (Riyadh), a neighbourhood of Rihadh, Saudi Arabia
- Al-Faruq Mosque, one of several mosques
- Dar Al-Farooq Islamic Center, in Bloomington, Minnesota

== Other uses ==
- Al-Farooq (book), biography of Umar by Shibli Nomani
- Al-Farooq (title)
- Farouq Brigades, a unit of the Free Syrian Army in the Syrian civil war

== See also ==
- Farooq (disambiguation)
- Furqan (disambiguation)
