= Al-Farooq (title) =

Islamic title for one who can tell right from wrong

Al-Farooq الفاروق
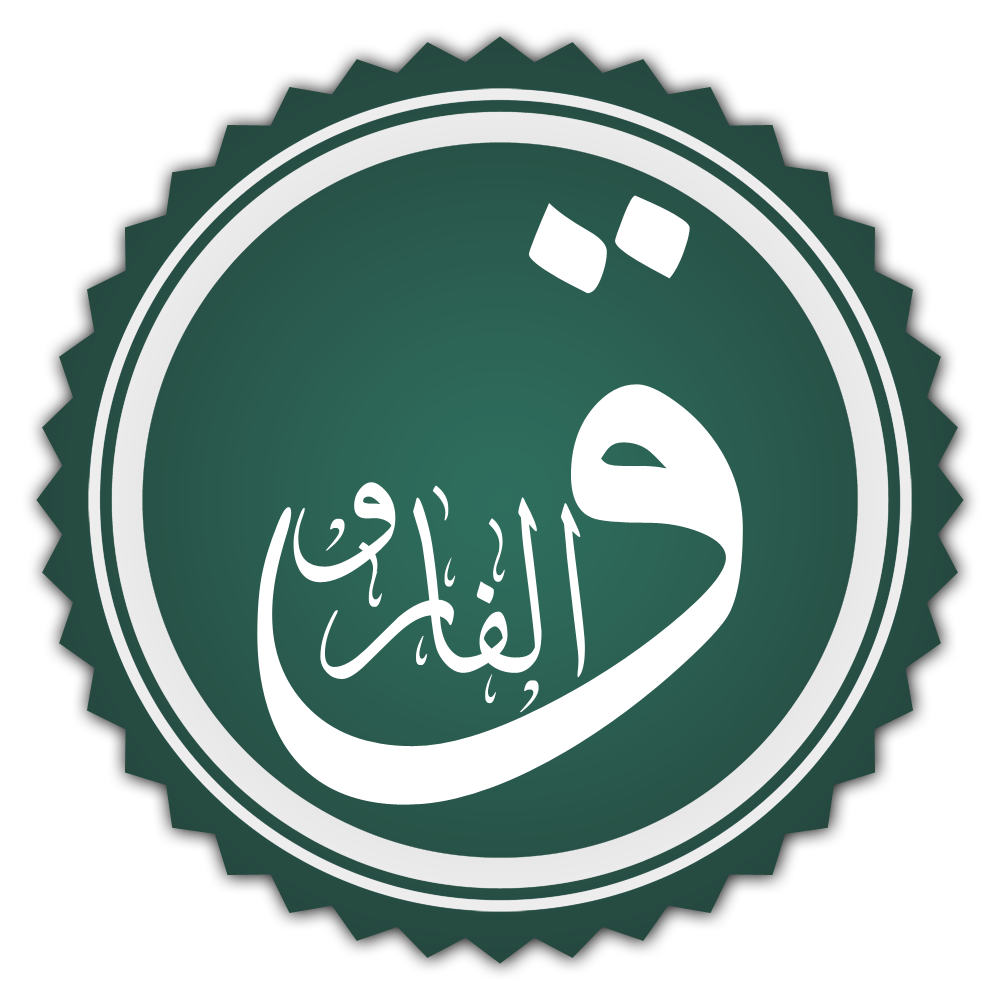
- Arabic Calligraphic representation of Al-Farooq
- Pronunciation: Al-Farooq (Arabic: فاروق), Farouk, Faruqi, Farook, Faruk, Faroeq, Faruq, Farouq, Farooqi, Farooqui, Fārūq
- Gender: Male
- Language: Arabic

Origin
- Meaning: The one who distinguishes right from wrong.
- Region of origin: Arabia (Middle East)

Al-Farooq (Arabic: الفاروق, "distinguisher") is the title given to one who distinguishes right from wrong. Sunni Muslims use the title Al-Farooq for Umar, while Shia Muslims believe it is a title reserved exclusively for Ali, and that the Prophet Muhammad gave him this title. There is disagreement among Sunnis as to whether the Prophet or the People of the Book gave this name to Umar.

== Etymology ==
According to the Lisān al-'Arab (Arabic dictionary by Ibn Manẓūr) al-Farouq refers to making a distinction between two subjects, and is a person who distinguishes between right and wrong. Al-Farooq is translated as "discriminator" by Gerald T. Elmore, Richard F. Burton. As, however, the morphophonology of the lexeme farūq is not Arabic, the word seems to be of Syro-Aramaic origin, e.g. pārōqā "Saviour" as for example pointed out by Robert M. Kerr.

== History ==
=== Sunni view ===
According to historical Sunni sources, Muhammad entitled Umar ibn al-Khattab as al-Farooq. The son of Kahn Jahan, the minister of Muhammad bin Tughluq claimed Umar ibn al-Khattab got this title from the Islamic prophet Muhammad. Also Umayyad caliph Sulayman called him discriminator (al-farooq) It is mentioned in the History of Tabari, Taqabat ibn Sad, and Tahdhib "the people of the Book (Jews) were the first to call Umar 'al-Faaruq, we have never heard the Prophet make such reference."

=== Shia view ===
Among historical Shia sources, there is a hadith attributed to Muhammad in which he entitled Ali ibn Abi Talib as al-Farooq. Abu Dhar al-Ghifari and Salman the Persian narrated some of this Hadithes There are also some Shia sources that emphasized that the people of the book called Omar bin al-Khattab as al-Farooq.

== See also ==
- Al-Farooq, modern biography about Umar
- Al Farooq Omar Bin Al Khattab Mosque, mosque named for him in Dubai
- Alevi
- Ali in the Quran
- Birthplace of Ali ibn Abi Talib
- Farooqi
- List of expeditions of Ali during Muhammad's era
- Sahaba
- Sunni view of Ali
- Omar, television series
- Wali
- Zulfiqar
