= Shoubak revolts =

Shoubak Revolt of 1905
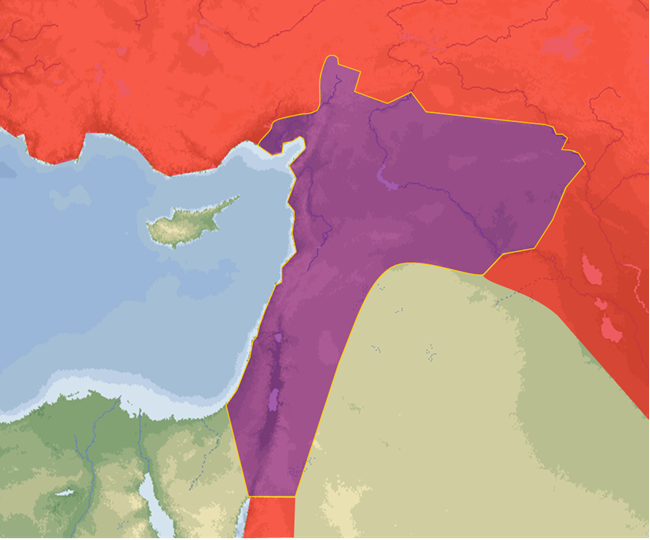
- View of Syria Vilayet
Date	May 1905
Location	Shoubak 30.531378°N 35.560825°E
Result	Rebellion brutally suppressed

Belligerents
Ottoman Empire	Inhabitants of Shoubak

Commanders and leaders
Ahmet Resber	Najab Al Wahib

Strength
100 armed horsemen	N/A

Casualties and losses
10 dead	150 dead
- Location within Jordan

The Shoubak revolts were a series of uprisings against Ottoman authority in the Transjordanian town of Shoubak that took place in 1900 and 1905. The second uprising started after the Ottoman forces started to put women of the town into forced labor, considered to be a deliberate act of punishment against the inhabitants of Shoubak who were frequently insubordinate. Shoubak rose in revolt and managed to rally the neighboring Bedouins with them; the perpetuators were brutally punished by military force through an Ottoman expedition sent from Al-Karak, just north of Shoubak.

== Shoubak revolt of 1900 ==
Heavy taxation by the Ottoman Empire authorities with no state-provided services in return led to a rebellion by the inhabitants of Shoubak in 1900. During that rebellion, the inhabitants of Shoubak climbed the town's Montreal Crusader Castle and killed a number of Ottoman soldiers. After the revolt failed to spread to neighboring towns and was quickly suppressed, the inhabitants of Shoubak were eager for another revolt.

== Shoubak revolt of 1905 ==
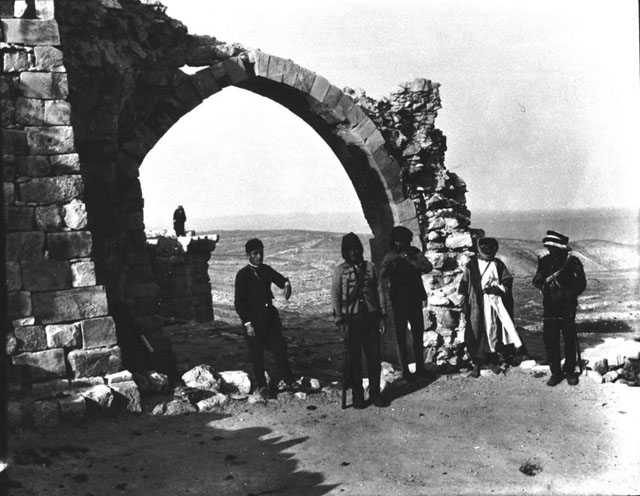
Inhabitants of Shoubak surrounding ruins of a church in 1900.

The second revolt started in May 1905, after Ottoman forces started to put women of the town into forced labor, tasking them with carrying water from springs deep in the valley to the Montreal Castle up above where the troops where stationed. This may have been a deliberate act of punishment against the inhabitants of Shoubak, who were frequently insubordinate. The people of Shoubak revolted because they considered the humiliation of their women as an attack on their honour. The townsmen assaulted and expelled Ottoman soldiers from the castle, and took shelter in it.

Historian Suleiman Mousa argues that Ottoman authorities intentionally humiliated the Arabs they governed in order to provoke them into a rebellion. The Mutasarrıf of the nearby town of Al-Karak sent a special expedition consisting of 100 armed horsemen to confront the rebels. The Bedouins of the area joined the rebels and together refused to surrender the castle to the Ottomans. The horsemen raided the town, killed a number of its inhabitants, reoccupied the castle, and confiscated a number of the townsmen's possessions.

== Aftermath ==
The events at Shoubak caused further tensions between the Arabs and the Ottoman authorities, and is believed to have contributed to local support for the Great Arab Revolt against the Ottomans in 1916.

== See also ==
- Karak Revolt (1910)
- Great Arab Revolt (1916)
