= Mahafzah =

Jordanian tribe

Mahafzah, Mahafzeh or Mahaftha is a Jordanian tribe who reside in such places as Kufr Jayiz, Waqqas and Ghor al-Safi (al-Karak). It originated in the Karak area, where it participated in the battles of Hittin and `Ayn Jalut and were among those who aided in resisting the Tatar encroachments on Muslim lands, and in particular Jordan and Palestine. The Mahafzah were relied upon to help aid a wing of the Muslim armies. Several members of the Mahaftha tribe left the small town of Kufr Jayiz in search of education and a better life. Today some Mahaftha tribe members reside in Irbid, Amman, Karak, England, Saudi Arabia, UAE and the United States of America, the census of mahfzah members around 3000, Mahafzah tribe has common council in Kufr Jayiz called Mazafah, they meet there in social occasions.
