= Mohammed Farooq =

Arab businessman

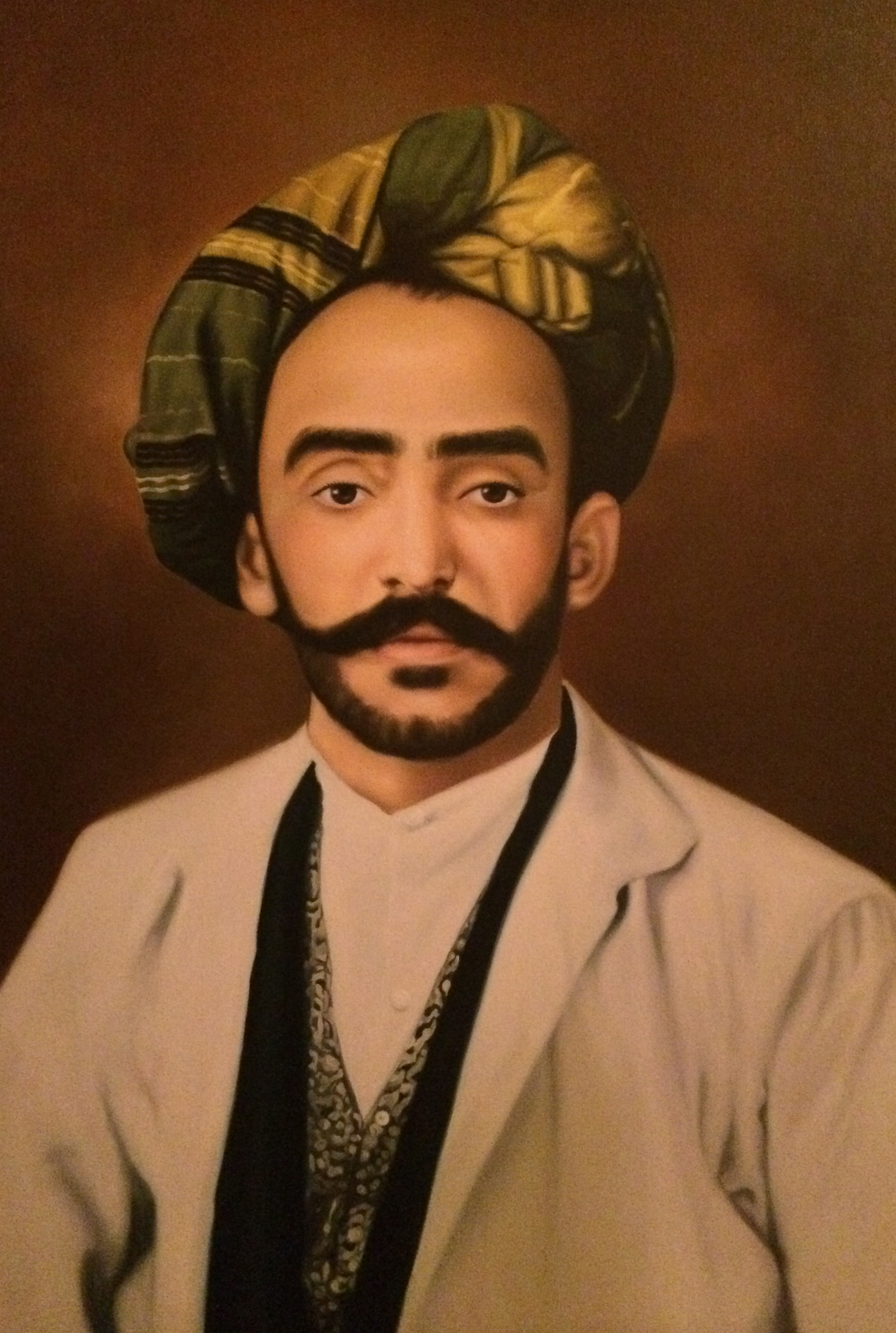
Mohammed Farooq, also remembered as The Great Farooq

Mohammed Farooq Bin Mohammed Aqil Bin Ahmed also known as The Great Farooq was a member of the Farooq Al Arshi Family and Al Khaladi family also known as the Sheikh Sultan Al Olama Family. A Huwala (Sunni Persian) family, the Farooq / Faruk or Faruq (Arabic: فاروق) Al Arshi family originates from Saudi Arabia belonging to the Al Ansar tribe that settled in Iran in the Hormozgan Province in the year 1200 Hijri. The family is amongst the first of UAE’s business and aristocratic families.

After Farooq's father Al Hajj Mohammed Aqil Bin Ahmed Bin Abdulwahid Al Arshi died, Mohammed Farooq, took over as the head of the family expanding the business internationally and mainly trading in diamonds, pearls and precious stones.

Today Mohammed Farooq is remembered as the most famous pearl merchant of Lengeh, Bastak and the Persian Gulf. The Great Farooq’s generosity and hospitality earned him respect and a reputable status amongst Gulf royalty.

As of 2014, the majority of the family members reside in the UAE, Bahrain, Kuwait, and Canada. The Farooq Al Arshi family has close ties with the Al Khaldi, fikree and Al Ulama families. The Al Ulamas are also known as the Sheikh Sultan Al Ulama family.

== See also ==
- Abdulkarim Farooq
- Farooq family
