= Karak revolt =

1910 Arab revolt against the Ottoman Empire in modern-day Jordan

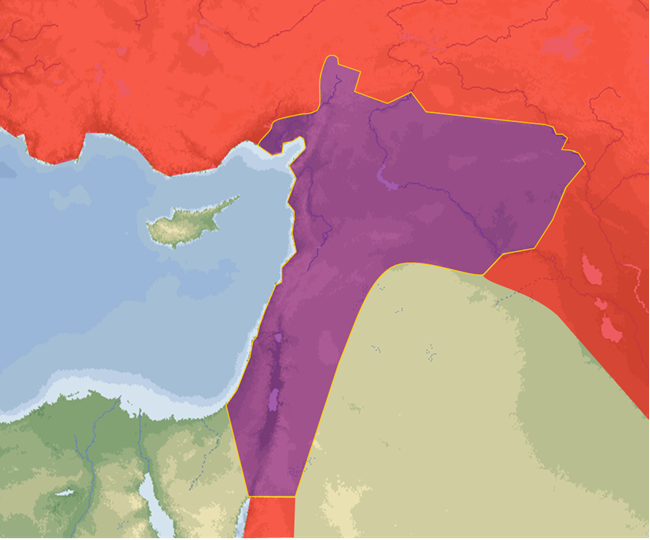
- View of Syria Vilayet
Date	4–10 December 1910
Location	Al-Karak 31.180556°N 35.701389°E
Result	Rebellion suppressed

Belligerents
Ottoman Empire	Inhabitants of Al-Karak

Commanders and leaders
Sami Pasha	Muhemet Tahir Pasha
- Location within Jordan

The Karak revolt was an uprising against Ottoman authority in the Transjordanian town of Al-Karak, which erupted on 4 December 1910. The revolt came after Sami Pasha, the governor of Damascus, wanted to apply the same measures of conscription, taxation, and disarmament to the inhabitants of Al-Karak that previously provoked the Hauran Druze Rebellion.

Al-Karak rose in revolt days after the arrival of an Ottoman census team, and insurgency quickly spread to neighboring towns of Ma'an and Tafila and a number of stations along the Hejaz Railway. Sami Pasha's forces ended the revolt with a random massacre, hundreds of people were imprisoned and ten revolt leaders were executed. The brutal suppression of the revolt had greatly angered the Karakis and is thought to have contributed to their support of the 1916 Great Arab Revolt.

== Background ==
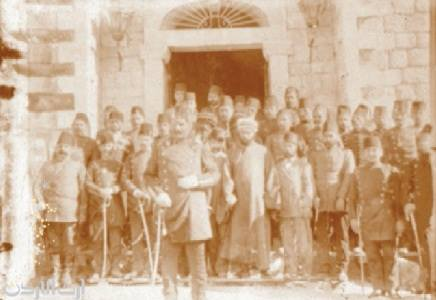
Ottoman officers in front of the Karak Saray following the Revolt

After the rise of Young Turks to power through their 1908 revolution, they began imposing a more centralized system of rule across the Ottoman Empire. This meant to put an end to local particularism, which was seen first in the violent suppression of the Hauran Druze Rebellion in Syria in 1909. During the Syrian rebellion, the Ottomans succeeded in suppressing the Jabal Druze revolt after conquering the villages, forcibly registering villagers and disarming them, collecting taxes in cash or cattle, and conscripting 1000 men into the Ottoman army. Ottoman governor Sami Pasha wanted to apply same measures in Transjordan: villages in Ajlun were encircled by 400 Ottoman soldiers who disarmed the villagers and took 85 conscripts. Governmental troops in Al-Salt and Madaba issued identity papers as a prelude to conscription.

Sami Pasha sent a telegram on 6 November 1910 from Jabal Druze to the Al-Karak Mutasarrıf Muhemet Tahir Pasha, requesting that the residents of the town demonstrate their loyalty to the Empire by ceding their weapons and submitting to personal registration. This was seen differently by the local population; measures of disarmament and conscription. The Mutasarrıf conveyed the message to the residents, who responded by requesting that they be allowed to keep their weapons for protection against Bedouin raiders. Sami Pasha assured them that the state would only conduct registration of people and lands but sent a large number of troops into the area, undermining his credibility.

== Rebellion ==
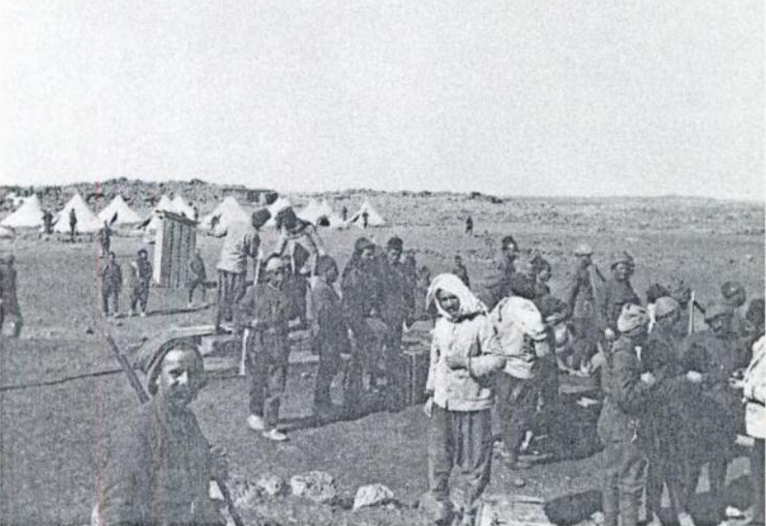
Troops of Sami Pasha at Daraa, responsible for ending the Hauran Druze Rebellion, were also dispatched to suppress Karak revolt

The Ottoman troops arrived in Al-Karak and conducted a census as if they had no intention of conscripting, while the Karakis went along with the census as if they had no intent on rebelling. Ottoman census teams conducted registration for 15 days without collecting weapons. At the same time, Qadr Majali, Karak's leading sheikh, began to go around the town advocating rebellion. Ottoman census teams were attacked and killed on 4 December, Al-Karak rose in revolt by the dawn of the next day. The revolt reached the neighboring towns of Tafila and Ma'an and a number of stations along the Hejaz Railway. Petty merchants from Damascus and Hebron opening their shops were the first to be attacked. The noise alerted the Ottoman troops, who retreated into the Karak Castle; those far from the safety of the citadel were killed. Insurgents broke into the saray (Ottoman headquarters) and distributed all the weapons they found in its arsenal. The rebels burnt records, governmental buildings, an Ottoman Bank branch, prisons, courts, the homes of Ottoman figures, and even the mosque.

The rebels acted without strategy: they only wanted to eliminate any Ottoman presence in their lives, almost temporarily ignoring the fact that behind the local government lay a large empire. Sami Pasha arrived at Al-Karak from Damascus with an army ten days later, intending to free the besieged officials in the castle and to restore Ottoman rule. The revolt in Al-Karak revealed the limits of Ottoman rule in Transjordan; measures of registration and conscription accepted in the northern towns of Ajloun and Al-Salt, provoked a large scale rebellion in the southern towns. Ajloun and Al-Salt had been Ottoman kazas for 43 years, while Al-Karak had only been so for 17 years.

== Aftermath ==
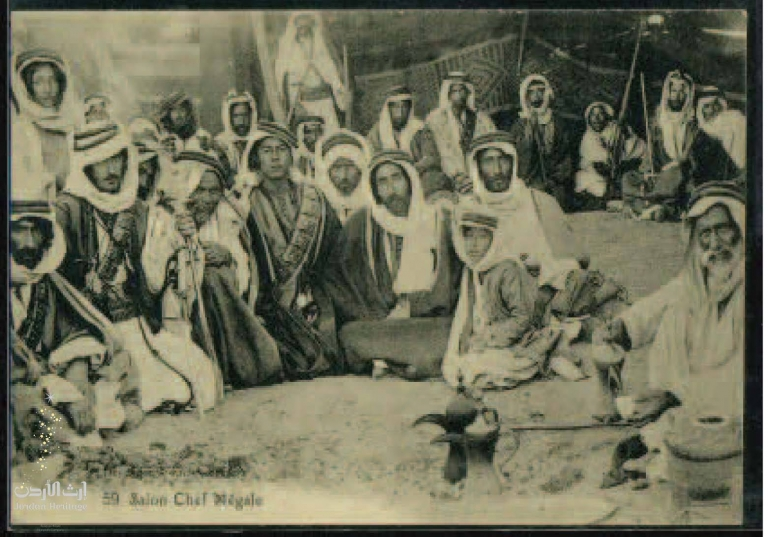
Qadr Majali between Karak notables following the Revolt

Sami Pasha's forces suppressed the revolt with an indiscriminate massacre, and the leaders of the revolt were executed; 5 in Damascus and another 5 in Al-Karak as an example to their fellow villagers. The inhabitants of Al-Karak were forced to pay compensation for all the damage done to state property. Hundreds of Karakis were imprisoned in Damascus and given harsh sentences ranging from years of hard labour to lifetime imprisonment. The demographic and economic recovery of Al-Karak was further undermined by the brutal suppression of the uprising. A general amnesty in 1912 ended the matter and released the prisoners from the revolt. The brutal suppression of the revolt greatly angered the locals and is thought to have contributed to their support of the 1916 Great Arab Revolt.

== See also ==
- Shoubak Revolt (1905)
- Great Arab Revolt (1916)
