= Abdulkarim Farooq =

Abdulkarim Bin Mohammed Farooq
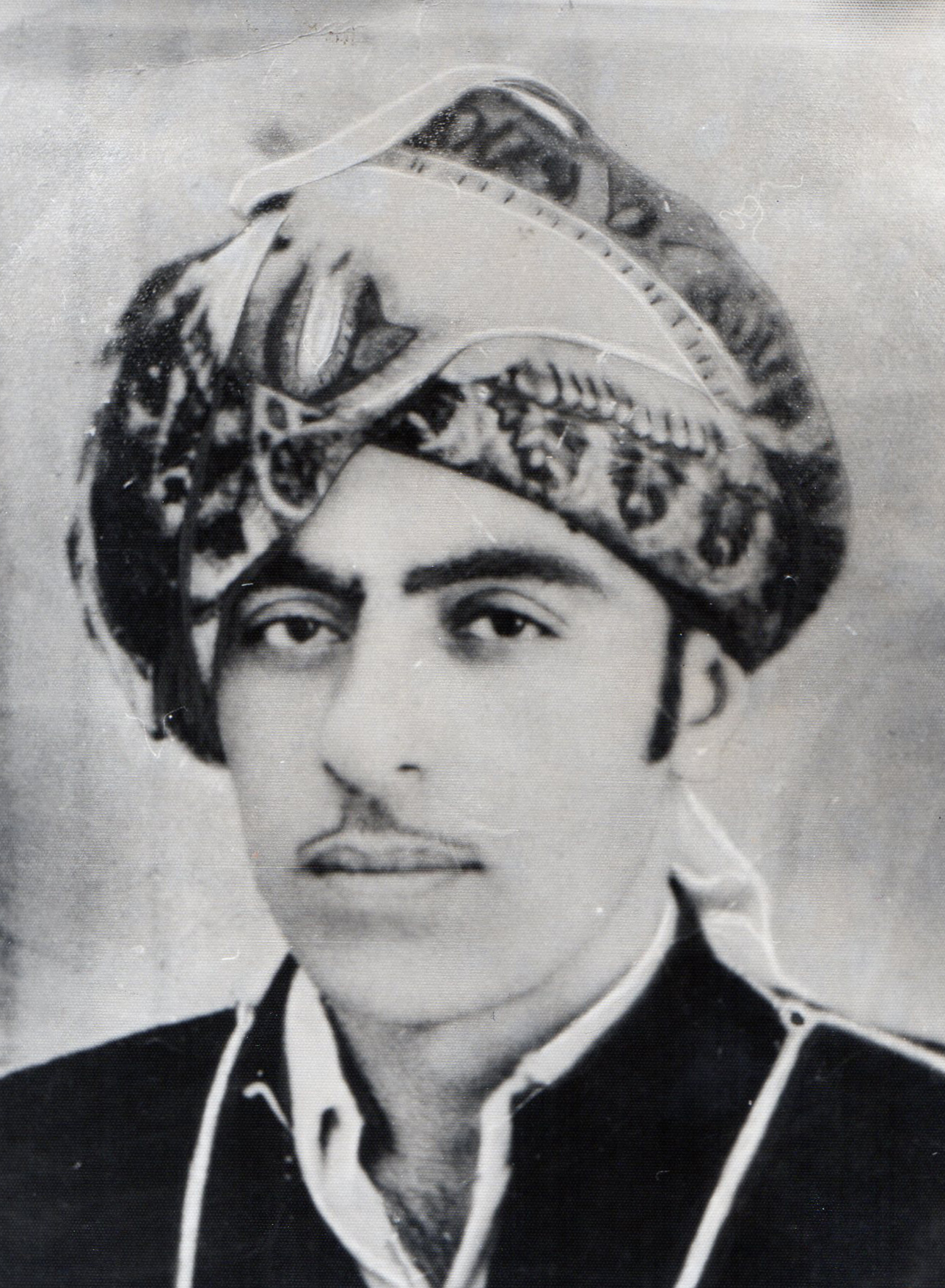
- Abdulkarim Farooq in traditional Arabic dress in the 1930s
- Born: Abdulkarim Bin Mohammed Farooq Bin Mohammed Aqil Bin Ahmed; Dubai
- Other names: Member of the Farooq, Al Arshi, and Al Khaladi families
- Occupations: Businessman, Advisor
- Known for: Heir to the Farooq legacy and business enterprise
- Notable work: Owner of the London Store in Al Bastakiya, Dubai
- Relatives: Mohammed Farooq (father), known as "The Great Farooq"
- Family: Farooq Al Arshi family

Abdulkarim Bin Mohammed Farooq Bin Mohammed Aqil Bin Ahmed was a member of the Farooq, Al Arshi Family, Al Khaladi family who are also known as The Sheikh Sultan Al Olama Family. A Huwala (Sunni Persian) family, the Farooq / Faruk or Faruq (Arabic: فاروق) Al Arshi family originates from Saudi Arabia belonging to the Al Ansar tribe that settled in Bastak in the Hormozgan Province in Iran in the year 1200 Hijri. The family is amongst the first of UAE’s business and aristocratic families.

Abdulkarim Farooq became the new heir to the Farooq legacy and business enterprise after the death of his father Mohammed Farooq known as "The Great Farooq". He owned the biggest general trading establishment in Al Bastakiya, Dubai known as London store which specialized in importing quality brands directly from London, UK. He was regarded as the "wealthiest man in Dubai and owned symbols of affluence which included a yach". ".

Abdulkarim Farooq was also an advisor to the rulers of Dubai, specifically the late Sheikh Rashid Bin Saeed Al Maktoum, the former ruler of Dubai, and other rulers across the Persian Gulf region.

As of 2014, the majority of the family members reside in the UAE, Bahrain, Kuwait, Canada and United States. The Farooq Al Arshi family has close ties with the Al Khaldi, Fikree and Al Ulama families. The Al Ulamas are also known as the Sheikh Sultan Al Ulama family.

== See also ==
- Mohammed Farooq
