= Furqan =

Furqan (Arabic: فُرقَان furqān), also spelt Furqaan, is an Arabic Islamic masculine given name, which means "criterion, proof, evidence, affirmation, testament". Furqan is another name of the Holy Qur'an and the 25th surah Al-Furqān. The Turkish spelling of the name is Furkan. Notable people with the name include:

== Given name ==
- Furqan Ahmad (born 1969), Indian politician
- Furqan Ansari (born 1948), Indian politician
- Furqan Qamar (born 1960), Indian academic
- Furqan Qureshi (born 1988), Pakistani television actor
- Furqan Hussain Tunio, Pakistani musician

== Other ==
- The Quran
- al-Furqan, the 25th sura of the Qur'an
- Al-Furqan Islamic Heritage Foundation, London, England
- al-Furqan Media Foundation, Islamic State of Iraq and the Levant

== See also ==
- Al-Farooq (disambiguation)
