= Faruki =

Faruki or Farukî is a Turkish surname. Notable people with the surname include:

- Kemal Faruki (1910–1988), Turkish footballer
- Nermin Farukî (1904–1991), Turkish sculptor

== See also ==
- Farooqi, Arabic cognate
