= Farooqui =

Farooqui (Arabic: الفاروقي); also transliterated as Farooqi, Faruki or Al Farooqui), is a surname of Arabic origin, indicating that one is a descendant of Farooq. Farooq means "the one who distinguishes between right and wrong".

Notable people with the surname include:

- Ismail al-Faruqi, Palestinian-American philosopher
- Muhammed Sharif al-Faruqi (1891–1920), Arab Ottoman staff officer
- Naseer Ahmad Faruqui, Islamic scholar
- Nisar Ahmed Faruqi, Islamic scholar
- Musharraf Ali Farooqui, Canadian writer
- Shad Saleem Faruqi, Malaysian legal scholar
- Khan Bahadur Nawab Sir Kazi Golam Mohiuddin Faroqui (1891–1984), Bengali knight and politician
- Sami Pasha al-Farouqi, Ottoman commander
- Munawar Faruqui, Indian stand-up comedian, singer, influencer, writer, rapper, reality show winner (Lock Upp)
- Abdul Aleem Farooqui, Indian Islamic scholar
- Darab Farooqui, Indian screenwriter, columnist, and poet.

== See also ==
- Umar
- Family tree of Umar
- Farooq
- Farrokh (name)
- Faruki, Turkish cognate
- Al-Farooq (book)
- Al Farooq Omar Bin Al Khattab Mosque
- Faruqi dynasty
