= Kazi Golam Mohiuddin Faroqui =

Khan Bahadur Nawab Sir Kazi Golam Mohiuddin Faroqui
- কাজী গোলাম মহিউদ্দিন ফারুকী

Member of the Bengal Legislative Council
- In office 1921–1937

Chief Whip at the Bengal Legislative Council
- In office 1921–1929

Chairman of the Tipperah District Board
- In office 1925–1929

Personal details
- Born: 1891 Comilla, British India
- Died: 4 April 1984 (aged 92–93) Calcutta, India
- Education: Dhaka College
- Occupation: Politician

Khan Bahadur Nawab Sir Kazi Golam Mohiuddin Faroqui (Bengali: স্যার কাজী গোলাম মহিউদ্দিন ফারুকী; 1891 – 4 April 1984), also known by his daak naam Suba Mia (Bengali: সুবা মিঞা), was a Bengali Muslim Zamindar, politician and minister.

== Early life and family ==
Kazi Golam Mohiuddin Farooqi was born in 1891 in Comilla during the Bengal Presidency, British India. His father, Kazi Riyazuddin Ahmad Farooqi, was a sub-registrar. His family was an aristocratic Bengali Muslim Farooqi Zamindar family that had traditionally served as Qadi in the region, hence were also known as Kazi, their ancestral home was in the village of Ratanpur in Nabinagar, Brahmanbaria. The family were descended from Kazi Omar Shah Farooqi, a high-ranking army officer of the Mughal emperor Farrukhsiyar who was awarded two parganas in the Tipperah district.

== Education ==
Faroqui was initially homeschooled by Hajee Ahmed Bell, Mr. Cally and Mr. Eden. He then went on to complete his FA from the Dacca College.

== Career ==
Faroqui entered politics in 1916, eventually joining the Muslim League. In 1917, he became a member of the Tipperah District Board and was elected as the commissioner of Comilla municipality. Faroqui also served as the chairman of the Tipperah District Board from 1925 to 1929.

He was elected to the Bengal Legislative Council in 1921 and was appointed as its Chief Whip by Surendranath Banerjee, serving this role until 1929. In the same year, he was entrusted as the minister for the Local Self-Government, Public Health, Agriculture, Industries, Cooperatives and Public Works departments. Through his efforts, the Government Aid to the Industrial Sector bill was passed in 1931. He also took the initiative for the establishment of the Co-operative Mortgage Bank to solve farmers' problems. Following the 1934 general elections, he was re-elected to the Bengal Legislative Council as an independent candidate. During his time in Calcutta, he served as the president of the Tripura Society for a long period and was the chief editor of The Hanafi weekly newspaper.

Faroqui was a member of the Dhaka University Senate. In honour of his father, he founded the Qazi Riazuddin High English School in Debidwar. In honour of his grandfather, he founded the Aftabia Madrasa in Comilla. Faroqui established pharmacies, ponds, post offices, police stations and sub-registrar offices in Debidwar.

== Awards ==
Faroqui was awarded the title of Khan Bahadur by the British Raj in 1924. In 1932, he was given the title of Nawab. Faroqui was knighted at the 1936 New Year Honours.

== Death ==
Faroqui died on 4 April 1984 in Calcutta, West Bengal.
