= Bakhtier Farouk =

American engineer

- Known for: J. Harland Billings Professor of Mechanical Engineering, Drexel University (appointed in 2004)
- Spouse: Nadira Farouk
- Children: Samira Farouk, MD (nephrologist, Mount Sinai Hospital, New York)

Academic background
- Education: B.S., Mechanical Engineering, Bangladesh University of Engineering and Technology (BUET), 1975; M.S. and Ph.D., University of Delaware, 1978 and 1981
- Doctoral advisor: Professor Selcuk Guceri (University of Delaware, 1981)
- Other advisors: Professor Fazle Hussain (University of Houston, 1976)

Academic work
- Main interests: Heat transfer; combustion; numerical methods; turbulence modeling; materials processing

Bakhtier Farouk is an engineer who has been the J. Harland Billings Professor at Drexel University since 2004, and is also a published author. He is a member of the American Society of Mechanical Engineers.

== Education and academic career ==
Farouk earned his Bachelor of Science at the Bangladesh University of Engineering and Technology in 1975. He was employed as a lecturer in their Mechanical Engineering Department from 1975 to 1976, and then pursued graduate training with the Mechanical Engineering Department at the University of Houston, Texas in 1976, ultimately earning his Master of Science and Doctor of Philosophy from the University of Delaware in 1978 and 1981. Subsequently, hired by Drexel University's Mechanical Engineering and Mechanics department as an assistant professor, he advanced to the ranks of associate professor and professor, respectively, in 1987 and 1989, and was then appointed as Drexel's J. Harland Billings Professor of Mechanical Engineering in 2004.
