= Mohammad Farooq =

Mohammad or Muhammad Farooq may refer to:

- Mohammad Farooq (cricketer) (born 1938), Pakistani cricketer
- Muhammad Farooq (cricketer, born 1992), Emirati cricketer
- Mohammad Farooq (cricketer, born 2004), Pakistani cricketer; see 2023–24 Pakistan Cup
- Mohammad Farooq Chishti (died 1968), Indian politician
- Muhammad Farooq Khan (1956–2010), Pakistani psychiatrist
- Muhammad Farooq Azam Malik, Pakistani politician
- Mohammad Farooq Shah (died 1990), Kashmiri separatist politician
- Mohammad Farooq Shaikh, Indian politician in Gujarat
- Mohammed Farooq Pawale, one of the perpetrators of the 1993 Bombay bombings

== See also ==
- Mohammed Farooq (fl. 20th century), Iranian businessman
- Mohammed Farooq (diplomat) (1949–2018), Bangladeshi diplomat
