= Ibn al-Quff =

Syrian physician (1233–1286)

Amīn-ad-Daula Abu-'l-Faraǧ ibn Yaʻqūb ibn Isḥāq Ibn al-Quff al-Karaki (Arabic: أمين الدولة أبو الفرج بن يعقوب بن إسحاق بن القف الكركي; AD 1233–1286) was an Arab physician and surgeon and writer of the earliest and largest medieval Arabic treatise intended solely for surgeons.

== Life ==
Ibn al-Quff, also known as "al-Malikī al-Masīḥī" (The Melkite Christian), was born in the city of Al Karak Jordan. His father was Muwaffaq al-Dīn Yaʿqūb and was a Melkite Christian Arab. His father had a good job opportunity and moved his family to Sarkhad in Syria, where Ibn al-Quff was tutored by Ibn Abi Uṣaybiʿah who introduced him to the medical studies. He studied with Ibn Abi Uṣaybiʿah and learned a lot of medical information, read many biographies on earlier doctors, and spent a large amount of time meditating on the material he studied and learned.

Ibn al-Quff later moved to Damascus, where he continued his studies in metaphysics, philosophy, medicine, natural sciences, and mathematics. It is unclear who instructed him in all of these subjects, but his education contributed to his subsequent medical career. After completing his studies, he was appointed physician-surgeon in the army stationed in Jordan. During his military service, he gained recognition as both a physician and a surgeon.

His reputation became widespread in the Muslim empire for conducting his work with honesty. He was later sent to Damascus and remained there teaching until his death at the age of fifty-two.

== Works ==
During his time in Jordan being a physician-surgeon Ibn al-Quff was writing many books and teaching people. He was actually more well known as a writer and educator on medical topics than being a doctor. He wrote at least ten commentaries and books during his lifetime. Seven of these works are known to exist today whether fragments or the entire work. One of his allegedly most famous works was a commentary on Ishārāt of Ibn Sīnā but there is no evidence of this today, it is assumed to have gone missing or Ibn al-Quff never finished it and produced it. Some of his most well known surviving works are listed below with a brief description.

- Kitāb al-ʻUmda fi 'l-ǧirāḥa (كتاب العمدة في الجراحة) or Basics in the Art of Surgery: a general medical manual covering anatomy and drugs therapy as well as surgical care, concentrating on wounds and tumors, however he excluded ophthalmology as he considered it to be a specialty with its own technical literature. The work was published in Hyderabad, India in 1937. This was by far the largest Arabic text on surgery during the entire medieval period. In this book Ibn al-Quff explained the connections between arteries and veins which was the earliest description of what would be known as capillaries. He did this work before the invention of a microscope and also explained how valves worked and the direction they opened and closed.
- Al-Shafi al-Tibb (The Comprehensive of the Healing Arts): His first medical encyclopedia, completed early 1272 AD.
- Jāmiʻ al-gharaḍ fī ḥifẓ al-ṣiḥḥah wa-dafʻ al-maraḍ (جامع الغرض في حفظ الصحة ودفع المرض): on preventive medicine and the preservation of health in 60 chapters, completed around 1275 AD. It is extant in several manuscripts.
- Al-usul fi sarh al-fusul: A two-volume commentary of the works of Hippocrates.
- Risala fi manafi al-a da: A treatise on the anatomy of the body's organs.
- Zubad at-Tabib: A book with advice for practicing physicians.
- Sarh al-Kulliyat: A commentary on Avicenna's work Qanun fi t-Tibb.
