= Farooq family =

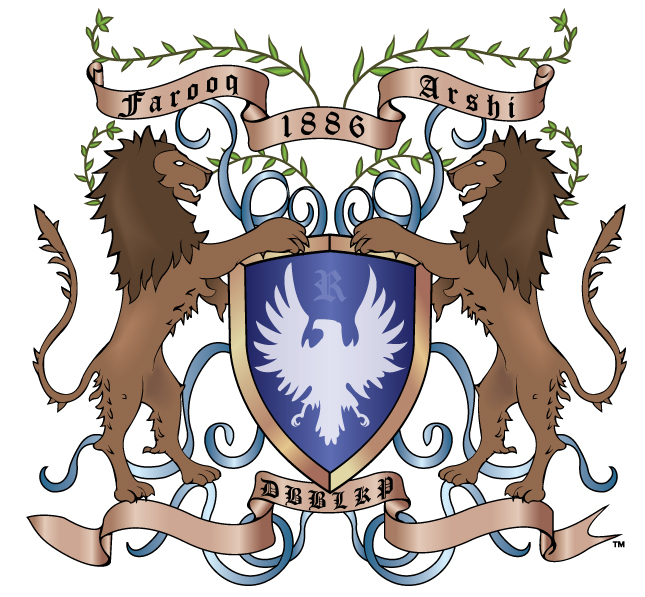
Farooq family seal

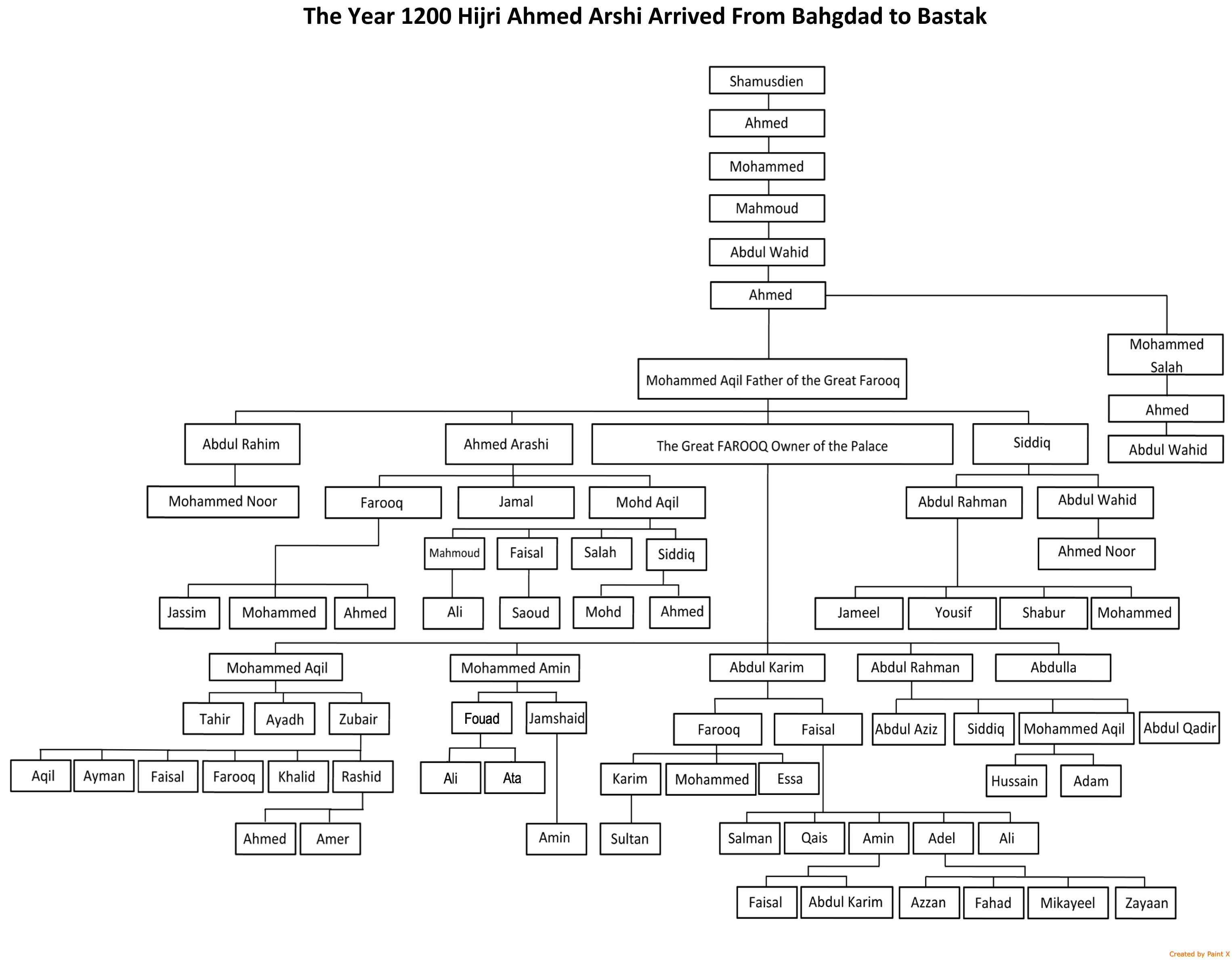
Farooq Family Tree 1

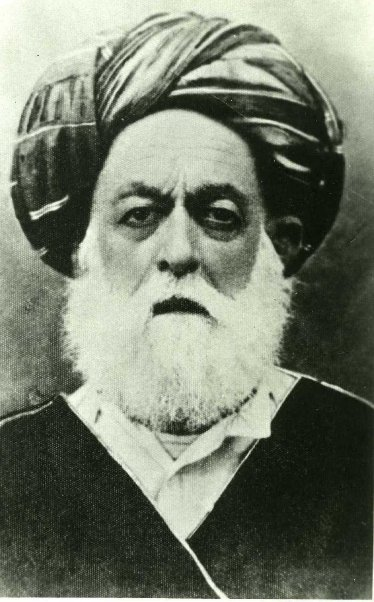
Late Al Hajj Mohammed Aqil was widely recognised as the most successful merchant of his time.

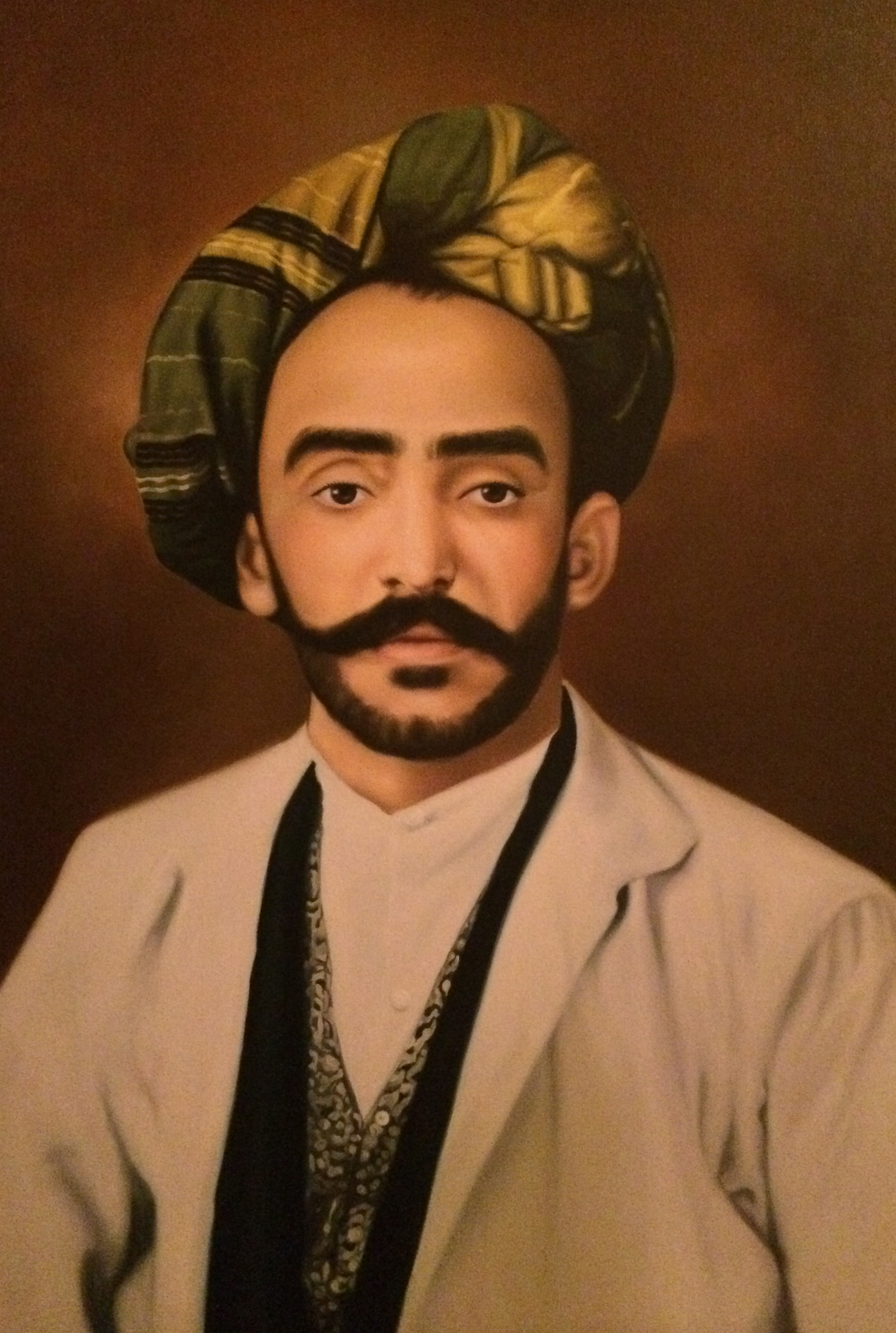
"The Great Farooq" Farooq Bin Mohammed Aqil

The Al Farooq (Arabic: فاروق) family are a Sunni Muslim business family originating from Saudi Arabia whose ancestral home was later Bastak in the Hormozgan province of southern Iran before eventually migrating to Dubai. The family is amongst the first of UAE's business and aristocratic families.

As of 2014, the majority of the family members reside in the UAE, Bahrain, Kuwait, the United States and Canada. The Farooq Al Arshi family are the first cousins of the Al Olema family. The Al Olemas are also known as the Sheikh Sultan Al Ulama, the Fikree, and the Al Khaldi family.

== Background ==
The Al Farooq family led by Al Hajj Mohammed Aqil was part of the first wave of migration which started in 1899 due to the "introduction of customs tax by the Persian government under the Qajar dynasty which led to reduced profits for merchants.

Political instability in 1909, and a flu epidemic in 1918 saw the heads of most merchant families from Bastak relocate to the Persian Gulf region, Karachi and the Indian Ocean regions.

After Al Hajj Mohammed Aqil died, his sons Mohammed Farooq, known as The Great Farooq and Ahmed Al Arshi took over as the heads of the family expanding the business internationally and mainly trading in diamonds, pearls and precious stones. As Coles and Jakson put it "The Great Farooq’s generosity and hospitality earned him respect and a reputable status amongst Gulf royalty".

After Mohammed Farooq died, his son Abdulkarim Farooq became the heir to the family. Abdulkarim Farooq was also an advisor to the former rulers across the Persian Gulf.

Abdulkarim Farooq owned a general trading establishment in Al Bastakiya, Dubai known as London store which specialized in importing quality brands directly from London, UK. He was regarded as the "wealthiest man in Dubai and owned symbols of affluence which included a yacht".

The rapidly expanding family business is now a truly global brand through various members of the respectable family amongst which is son of Mohammed Aqil Mohammed Farooq Mohammed Aqil Arshi: Dr. Mohammed Zubair Farooq Al Arshi, a renowned poet and medical doctor.

Family members that currently rule the business including world renowned designer Sultana Farooq owner of the iconic Falcon House, Mohammed Farooq Abdulkarim Farooq, Essa Farooq Abdulkarim Farooq, Khalid Farooq, Sana Mohammed Zubair Farooq and Rashed Farooq. The family is profoundly known for their ambitious, entrepreneurial and philanthropist stance and work with many international, commercial and Charitable organisations.

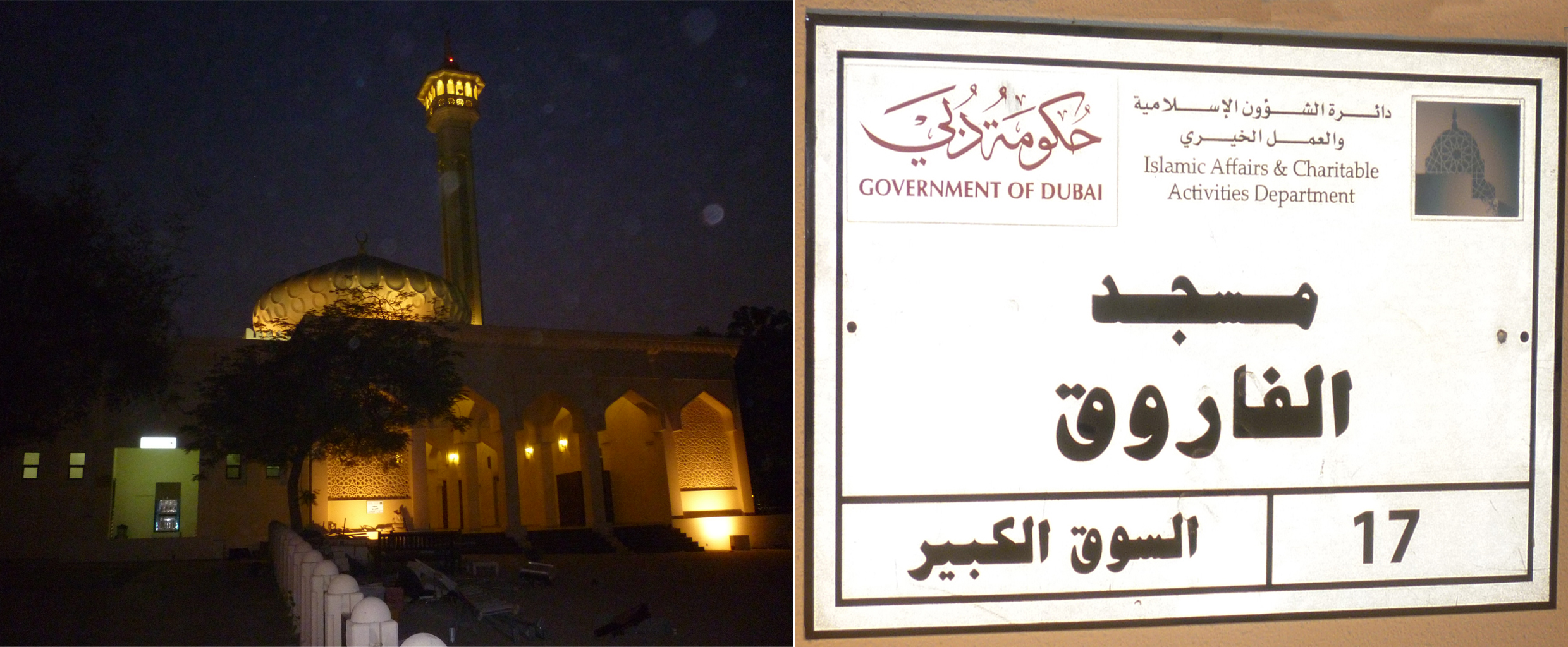
This mosque was built by the Farooq family for the purpose of worship during their early business travel to Dubai

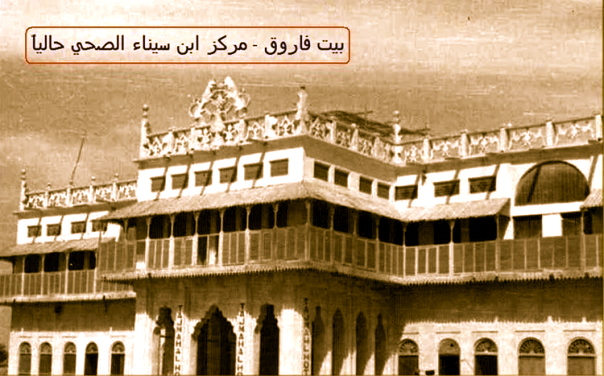
Farooq Mansion In Bahrain. Now Ibn Sena medical centre

The female members of the Farooq family have also contributed successfully. Faiqa Farooq, daughter of The Great Farooq, was the Arab world's first female ambassador of the United Nations. Faiqa was born in Paris in 1929, and joined the diplomatic corps of Tunisia due to her Tunisian mother, and was soon posted to Washington as the Third Secretary.

== Social responsibility ==
The Al Farooq family has a history of association with humanitarian causes. The Bait (house) Farooq in Bahrain played host to many events that contributed to the good of society. One of the most renowned political events that were held at the "Bait" Farooq during 1948, provided the initial impetus of Bahrain’s support for Palestine. The mass meeting led to many generous donations and lectures about Palestine during the year.

Today, the generosity of the Al Farooq family is evident through various landmarks such as a mosques and the Farooq House part of the Dubai creek heritage in Al Bastakiya, Dubai and a museum in Bandar Lengeh all named after the family.

The Al Arshi’s continue to support various global initiatives focused on humanitarian and environmental issues.

Trivia

In English, the family name is often spelt ‘Farooq’ / ‘Faruk’ or ‘Faruq’, however in Arabic and Persian the spelling is فاروق.

Businesses were often operated by the men of the Al Arshi family in Bandar Lengeh who would regularly travel back to Bastak during trading, to visit their families. Consequently, the family built a mosque in Al Bastakiya, one of the oldest a districts in Dubai. The mosque is now known as the Farooq Mosque.

The original wind tower house that this family lived in while staying in Bandar Lengeh has been turned into a museum and is sometimes called the Farooq mansion due to its size.

The Great Mohammed Farooq had close ties with the rulers of Arab States of the Persian Gulf, namely the late Sheikh Mohammed Bin Saqer Al Qasimi, the former ruler of Sharjah and Ras Al Khaimah and the late Sheikh Saeed Bin Maktoum Al Maktoum, The former Ruler of Dubai.

Abdulkarim Farooq was an extremely close associate and advisor to the rulers of the Gulf, as was his father "The Great Farooq" before him.

The official Farooq family Seal of the two carved lions was placed at the entrance of Bayt Faruq in Bahrain Which is now current Day Ibn Sina medical hospital.

Faiqa Farooq, The Arab world's first women ambassador to the United Nations is from the Farooq and Al Arshi family.

The Farooq and Al Arshi family name have been recognized as one of the wealthiest families in the Persian Gulf area.

Two-thirds of the family currently resides in the UAE.

The book Windtower which has been used as a reference in a foreword by HRH the Prince of Wales.
