= Farouk Tebbal =

Algerian politician

Farouk Tebbal was the Algerian minister for the environment in the 1992 government of Belaid Abdessalam.
