= Al-Faruq Mosque =

The Al-Faruq Mosque or Al Farooq Mosque may refer to:

- Al-Faruq Mosque (Denmark) in Copenhagen, Denmark
- Al-Faruq Mosque (Puerto Rico) in Vega Alta, Puerto Rico
- Al-Farooq Masjid, in Atlanta, Georgia, US
- Omar Al-Farooq Mosque, in Kandahar, Afghanistan
