= Birthplace of Ali =

Place where Ali ibn Abi Talib was born

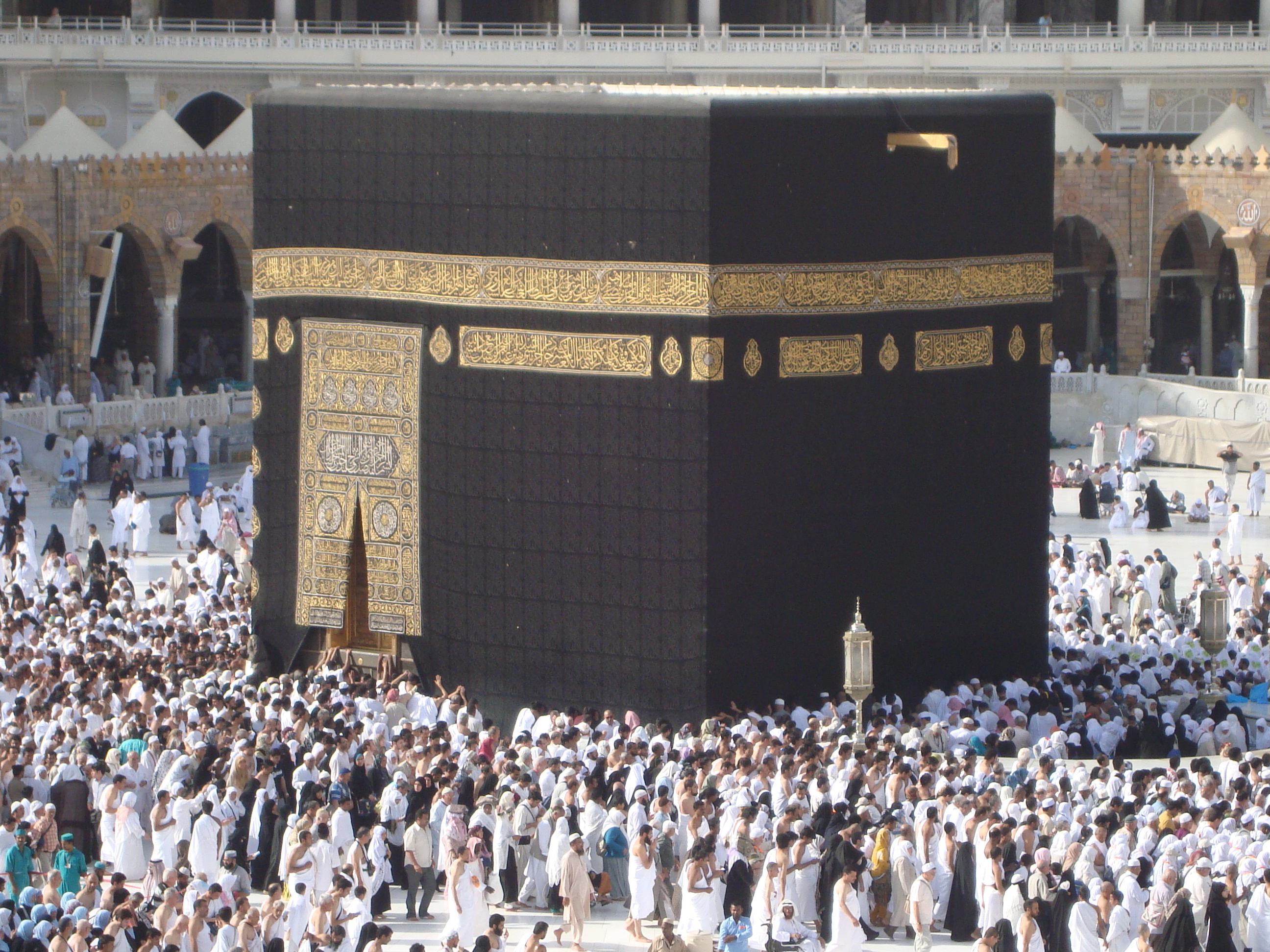
Ali is said to have been born inside the Ka'ba, the holiest site in Islam, pictured above

Ali ibn Abi Talib (601-661 CE) is recognized as the fourth Sunni caliph and the first Shia imam. Shia and some Sunni sources introduce Ali as the only person born inside the Ka'ba, the ancient shrine in the city of Mecca which later became the most sacred site in Islam.

== Historical accounts ==
Ali was born to Abu Talib and his wife Fatima bint Asad around 600 CE, some thirty years after the Year of the Elephant. Shia and some Sunni sources report that Ali was the only person born in the Ka'ba, the ancient shrine in the city of Mecca which later became the most sacred site in Islam. Some sources also offer miraculous descriptions of this incident. In particular, it is said that the wall of Ka'ba, or its door, slivered open as Fatima prayed there and shut close after she entered. She later emerged from the Ka'ba with a baby boy, as people awaited her outside, unable to enter.

== Historiography ==
Kitab al-Irshad, a Shia collective biography, and the Sunni history The Meadows of Gold both report that Ali was born inside the Ka'ba. Indeed, Shia sources are unanimous in this belief and regard the incident as unique to Ali, an indication of his high spiritual station. This account is also accepted by some Sunni authors, such as the historian al-Mas'udi (d. 956), who nevertheless regards birth in the Ka'ba as a great distinction not unique to Ali. Among others, that Ali was born inside the Ka'ba is the view of the contemporary Sunni scholar Shah Waliullah Dehlawi (d. 1762).

== See also ==
- Ali
- Ka'ba
