= Farouq Molloy =

British artist

Farouq Molloy, born Sean Molloy in 1957 in Plymouth, is a British "outsider" artist. He initially drew on graph paper with a black biro, then began working with colours. His patterned drawings incorporate "Islamic and North African decorative elements", reflecting his conversion to Islam in the early 1990s.

Molloy's work was exhibited at the Tranquil Minds exhibition in 2004, and at the British Outsider Art exhibition in Paris in 2008. It was also featured in Prospect Magazine n°106, in January 2005.
