= Samira Farouk =

Transplant nephrologist

- Education: Icahn School of Medicine at Mount Sinai (MS) Robert Wood Johnson Medical School Rutgers University (MD) Princeton University (BSE Chemical Engineering, Spanish and Portuguese Language & Culture)
- Occupation(s): Transplant Nephrologist, Assistant Professor of Medicine, Assistant Professor of Medical Education

Samira Farouk, MD, MS, FASN is a board-certified transplant nephrologist and Associate Professor of Medicine and Medical Education at Icahn School of Medicine at Mount Sinai (ISMMS). She teaches medical students, residents, and fellows, and also develops and studies innovations in medical education. Her clinical research interests include the pathogenesis of kidney fibrosis in regards to transplant survival and chronic kidney diseases. Farouk is also cofounder of the free mobile-friendly nephrology teaching tool NephSIM, Associate Program Director of the Nephrology Fellowship at ISMMS, and Director of Mentoring and Trainee Engagement of KIDNEYcon.

== Early life and education ==
Farouk is originally from New Jersey. She received multiple scholarships and awards by the time she graduated from Cherry Hill High School East in 2003 as Valedictorian, including the Edward J. Bloustein Scholarship, Robert C. Byrd Scholarship and the NSJIAA athlete award. Farouk then attended Princeton University where she graduated with a B.S.E. in Chemical Engineering and also obtained a certificate in Spanish and Portuguese Language and Culture in 2007.

Farouk went on to earn her Medical Degree (M.D.) from Rutgers University, Robert Wood Johnson Medical School in 2012 with a Distinction in Research. In 2015, she finished her internship and internal medicine residency at ISMMS in New York City. During her time at Rutgers, she had planned to go into cardiology, but gained a passion for nephrology after working with nephrology mentors and treating patients with kidney disease during her residency. She completed her Nephrology Fellowship and Transplant Fellowship before earning a Master of Science (M.S.) in Clinical Research also at the Icahn School of Medicine. Her dissertation, published in 2019, investigated how T-cell function is regulated by hematopoietic cell kinase in kidney disease. After serving as Chief Fellow at Sinai, she now serves as the Associate Program Director of the Nephrology Fellowship Program.

== Career ==
Farouk is currently an Associate Professor of Medicine and Medical Education at ISMMS. She teaches residents, fellows and medical students while serving as associate director of the Nephrology Fellowship Program. Her passion for teaching began during her internship, but increased throughout her nephrology residency and also after joining the Nephrology Social Media Collective (NSMC). Farouk realized the global impact education had on the medical community after working with free open access medical education (FOAMed) through NSMC and cofounding NephSIM, a virtual nephrology teaching tool, alongside Dr. Rachel Hillburg. In 2018, NephSIM won the American Society of Nephrology Innovations (ASN) in Kidney Education Contest, and in 2020 Farouk was awarded the William and Sandra Bennett Clinical Scholars Grant to implement and study its impact on medical student education.

Farouk is also cofounder and social media director of the SIM series, a set of virtual learning and teaching tools for different medical disciplines. Among them are NephSIM, Neuro SIM, GI SIM, and 20/20 SIM, which use case-based study to teach Nephrology, Neurology, Gastroenterology/Hepatology, and Ophthalmology, respectively.

Farouk is now dedicated to further studying and developing educational tools like NephSIM, and aims to implement them into medical school curricula. In addition to her roles as an educator, Farouk also treats transplant patients with clinical focuses on chronic kidney disease, kidney injury, and transplant care among others.

== Social media and mentorship ==
On top of her occupations as an educator, practicing physician, and clinical researcher, Farouk serves as social media director of the nephrology division at Mount Sinai and is an active nephrology and transplant advocate on social media, particularly Twitter. Farouk is also a member of the ASN media and communications committee.

In 2019, Farouk played an integral role in the success of KIDNEYcon by introducing free open access medical education (FOAMed), innovating aspects of mentorship, and organizing multiple of the conference's activities. In April 2019, Farouk joined the KIDNEYcon team as Director of Mentoring and Trainee Engagement, taking on more coordination and mentorship responsibilities for the 2020 conference.

Farouk is also an executive board member of the Nephrology Social Media Collective (NSMC). Within NSMC, she is co-editor of the Renal Fellow Network, and previous member of nephrology podcast "Freely Filtered" hosted through the Nephrology Journal Club, "NephJC". The journal club discusses research and editorials surrounding nephrology, and uses Twitter as its primary platform to do so. She is also executive board member and organizer of the annual NephMadness event held by the American Journal of Kidney Diseases. Based on MarchMadness, the initiative uses disciplines in kidney medicine for the brackets, and overall aims to increase education of nephrology.

Farouk is also on the 2021 executive committee of Trainee and Young Faculty Community of Practice, an American Society of Transplantation initiative to provide younger faculty with mentorship and research opportunities. She aims to be a mentor to aspiring clinician educators and to inspire the next generation of physicians to consider careers in nephrology.

== Select publications ==
- Farouk, S. S., & Rein, J. L. (2020). "The Many Faces of Calcineurin Inhibitor Toxicity – What the FK?". Advances in chronic kidney disease, 27(1), 56–66. doi:10.1053/j.ackd.2019.08.006
- Farouk, S. S., Hilburg, R., & Sparks, M. A. (2019). "Design, Dissemination, and Assessment of NephSIM: A Mobile-Optimized Nephrology Teaching Tool." Journal of graduate medical education, 11(6), 708–712. doi:10.4300/JGME-D-19-00443.1
- Ramakrishnan, M., Sparks, M. A., & Farouk, S. S. (2020). "Training the Public Physician: The Nephrology Social Media Collective Internship." Seminars in nephrology, 40(3), 320–327. doi:10.1016/j.semnephrol.2020.04.012
- Cravedi, Paolo; Mothi, Suraj S.; Azzi, Yorg; Haverly, Meredith; Farouk, Samira S.; Pérez‐Sáez, María J.; Redondo‐Pachón, Maria D.; Murphy, Barbara; Florman, Sander; Cyrino, Laura G.; Grafals, Monica (2020-08-04). "COVID‐19 and kidney transplantation: Results from the TANGO International Transplant Consortium". American Journal of Transplantation. 20 (11): 3140–3148. doi:10.1111/ajt.16185. ISSN 1600-6135.
- Hilburg, Rachel; Patel, Niralee; Ambruso, Sophia; Biewald, Mollie A.; Farouk, Samira S. (2020-09). "Medical Education During the Coronavirus Disease-2019 Pandemic: Learning From a Distance". Advances in Chronic Kidney Disease. 27 (5): 412–417. doi:10.1053/j.ackd.2020.05.017. ISSN 1548-5595.

== Awards ==
| Year | Award | Organization | Official Website | Reference |
|---|---|---|---|---|
| 2020 | William and Sandra Bennett Clinical Scholars Program Recipient | American Society of Nephrology | | |
| 2018 | Innovation in Education | American Society of Nephrology | | |
| 2018 | Excellence in Teaching Housestaff Award | Institute of Medical Education | | |
| 2018 | Fellow Recognition Award | East Harlem Health Outreach Partnership | | |
| 2017 | Reduce the Overuse Challenge: Quality Improvement Project Grant | Mount Sinai High Value Care Committee | | |
