= Faruk Türünz =

Turkish luthier (born 1944)

Faruk Türünz (born 28 June 1944 in Adana, Turkey) is a Turkish luthier who specializes in ouds and is considered one of the best oud makers. His shop is in Istanbul, Turkey.

Having worked as a primary school teacher for 10 years, Türünz started constructing ouds in 1984, after studying with Cafer Açın, head of the Musical Instruments Construction Branch of Istanbul Technical University. Since then, he has devised a method of tuning the oud's soundboard and braces.

British oud player and musicologist Khyam Allami, who writes a blog for BBC Radio 3, described how he fell in love with one of Türünz's instruments: "How a musical instrument can break your heart I don't know but it did, and I was very sad."

Türünz is considered a master oud-maker, and has people travel from countries such as Palestine to study with him.
