= Sami Pasha al-Farouqi =

Ottoman military officer (1861-1911)

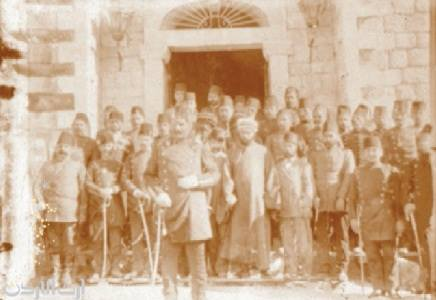
- Sami Pasha al-Farouqi with Ottoman officers in front of the Karak Saray following the Revolt in 1910

Minister of Zaptiye
- In office 1908 – 16 April 1909

Member of Senate of the Ottoman Empire
- In office 27 December 1908 – 1911

Personal details
- Born: 1861 Baghdad, Ottoman Iraq, Ottoman Empire
- Died: 1911 (aged 49–50) Damascus, Ottoman Syria, Ottoman Empire

Sami Pasha al-Farouqi (1861–1911) was an Ottoman statesman. He was born in Baghdad, Ottoman Iraq, in 1861. (Note: Some sources indicate that he was born in 1847 in Mosul.) He graduated from Turkish Military Academy and the War Academy in Istanbul and joined the army in 1887 as a staff captain. He served as an attaché in Berlin for many years. He was assigned to suppress a rebellion in Yemen. In 1906, he was the leader of Turkish troops in Al-Qassim which eventually had to withdraw from the region under pressure from Al Saud.

On December 27, 1908, he was appointed as a member of the Senate. Between 1908 and April 16, 1909, he served as the Minister of Zaptiye. He was appointed as the commander of the army formed to suppress the Hauran Druze Rebellion. He fell ill during the suppression of the rebellion and died in Damascus in 1911.
