= Al-Karak =

City in Karak Governorate, Jordan

Al-Karak الكرك
- City
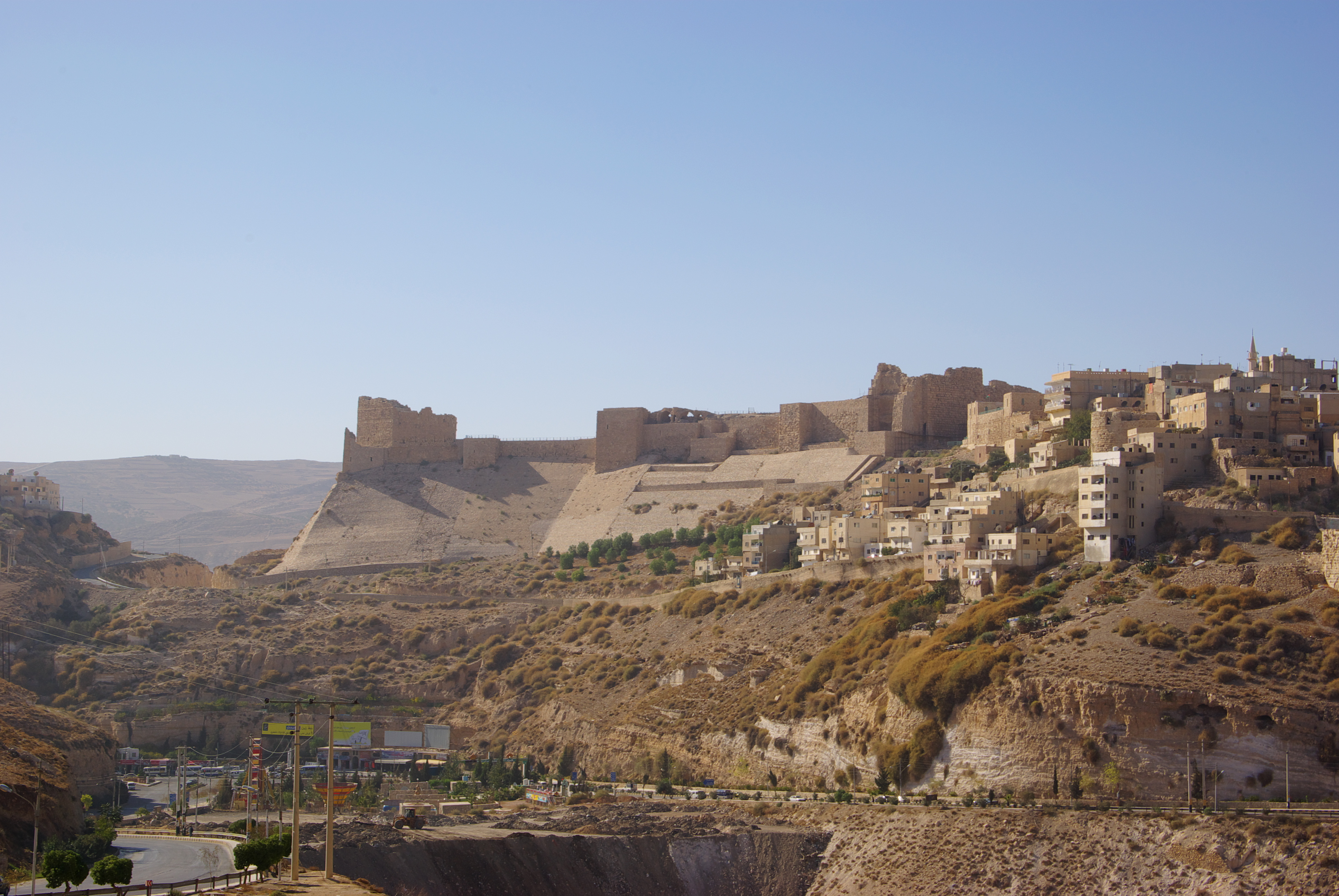
- The Karak Castle

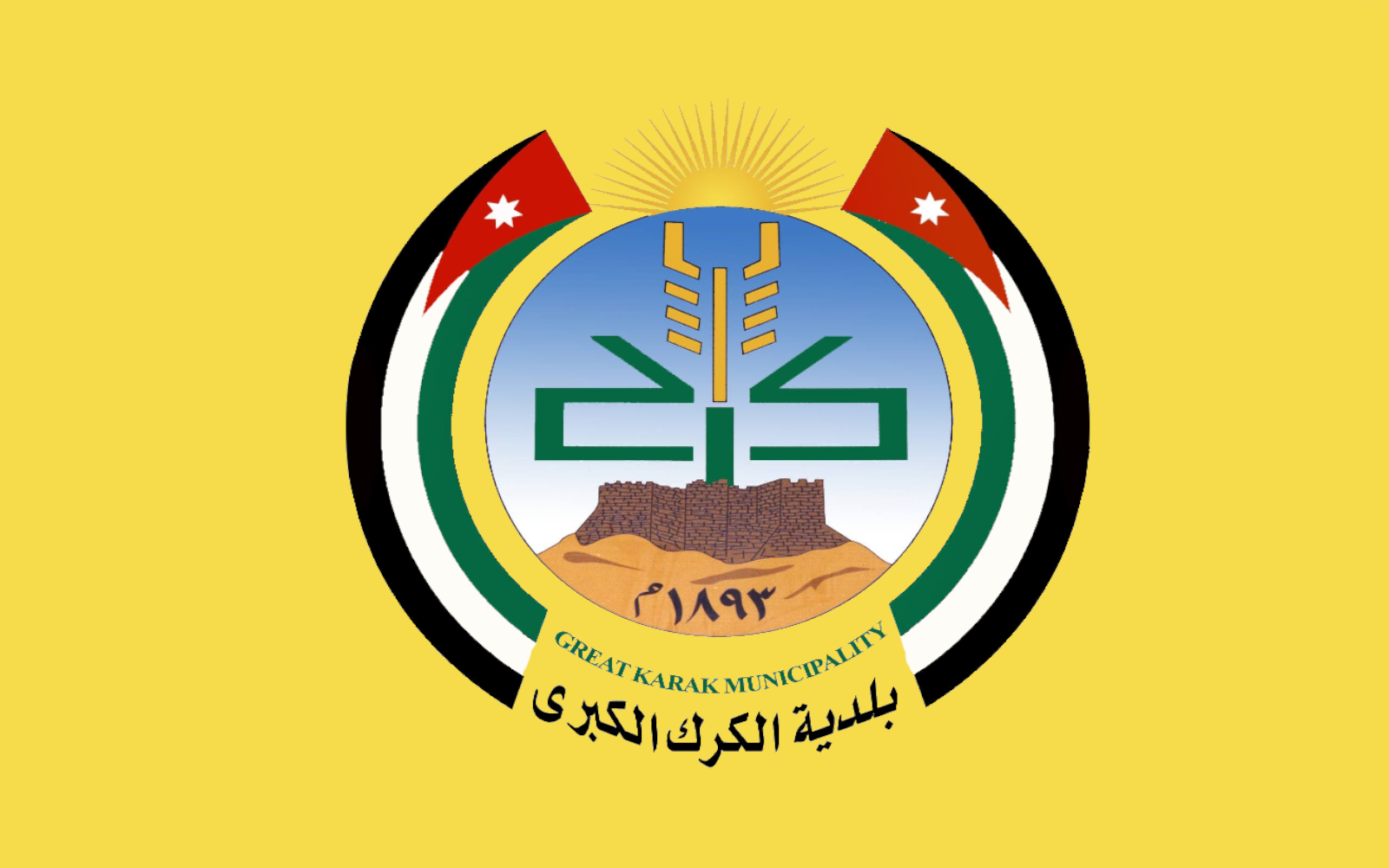
- Flag
- Nickname: Qir of Moab
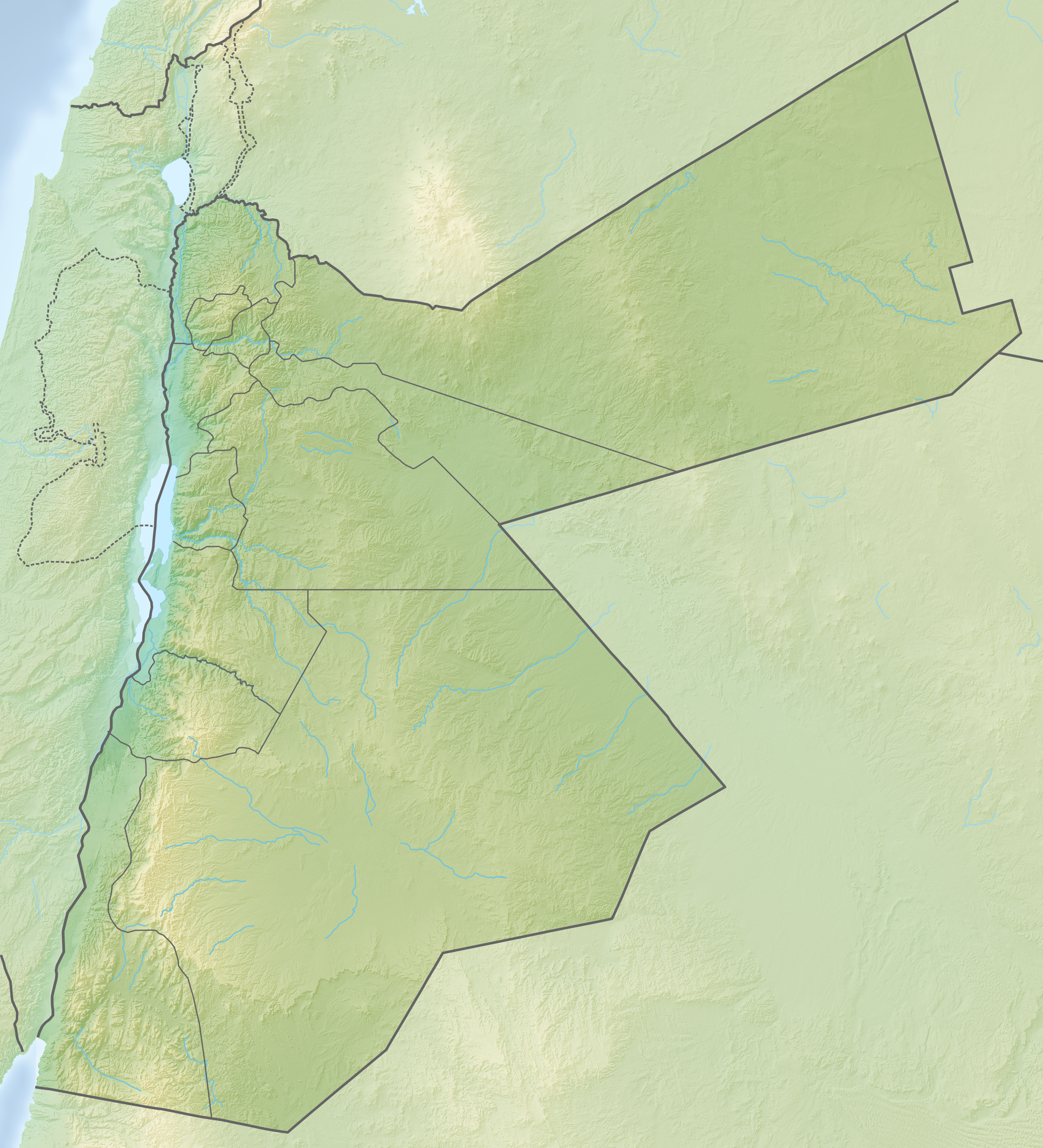
- Location within Jordan
- Coordinates: 31°11′0″N 35°42′0″E
- Grid position: 216/065
- Country: Jordan
- Governorate: Karak Governorate
- Greater Karak Municipality: 1893

Government
  - Mayor: Mohammed Maaitah

Area
  - Metro: 765 km^{2} (295 sq mi)
- Elevation: 930 m (3,050 ft)

Population (2015)
  - City: 32,216
  - Metro: 351,169
- Time zone: GMT +2
  - Summer (DST): +3
- Area code: +(962)2

Al-Karak (Arabic: الكرك), in English sources often simply Karak, is a city in Jordan known for its medieval Kerak Castle, which is one of the three largest in the region, the other two being in Syria. Al-Karak is the capital city of the Karak Governorate.

Al-Karak lies 140 kilometres (87 mi) to the south of Amman on the ancient King's Highway. It is situated on a hilltop about 1,000 metres (3,300 ft) above sea level and is surrounded on three sides by a valley. Al-Karak has a view of the Dead Sea. A city of about 32,216 people (2005) was formed around the castle. The town is built on a triangular plateau with the castle at its narrow southern tip.

== History ==
=== Iron Age to Assyrian period ===
Al-Karak has been inhabited since at least the Iron Age, and was an important city for the Moabites. In the Bible it is called Kir-haresh, Kir-hareseth or Kir of Moab, and is identified as having been subject to the Neo-Assyrian Empire; in the Books of Kings (2 Kings 16:9) and Book of Amos (Amos 1:5, 9:7), it is mentioned as the place where the Arameans went before they settled in the regions in the northern Levant, and to which Tiglath-Pileser III (r. 745–727 BC) sent prisoners after the conquest of Damascus. Later the Shamaili kingdom seized power, but little has been recorded about this period. In 1958, the El-Kerak Inscription was found in Wadi al-Karak, dated to the late 9th century BC.

=== Hellenistic to Early Muslim period ===
During the late Hellenistic Period, Al-Karak became an important town, taking its name from the Aramaic word for town, Kharkha (כרכא).

The area eventually became a Nabatean stronghold. The Roman Empire conquered it in 105 AD. The city was known in Late Antiquity as Harreketh.

Al-Karak is home to some of the oldest Christian communities in the world, dating back to the 1st century AD. Under the Byzantine Empire, Charach (Ancient Greek: Χαραχ, Kharkh) or Charach of the Moabites (Χαραχμωβα, Kharakhmōba) was the seat of the Church of Nazareth, and remained predominantly Christian under Arab rule following the 629 Battle of Mu'tah. Its bishop Demetrius took part in the council of the three provinces of Palaestina held in Jerusalem in 536. Another bishop, by the name of John, is said to have lived there in the 9th century.

=== Crusader, Ayyubid and Mamluk periods ===
Al-Karak fell within the Crusader lordship of Oultrejourdain, the lands east of the River Jordan and the Dead Sea. In 1132, King Fulk of Jerusalem made Pagan the Butler Lord of Montreal and Oultrejourdain. Pagan made his headquarters at al-Karak, where he built a castle on a hill called by the Crusaders Petra Deserti - The Stone of the Desert. His castle, much modified, dominates the town to this day.

The castle was in Crusader hands for only 46 years. It had been threatened by Saladin's armies several times, but finally surrendered in 1188, after the crushing Crusader defeat at the Battle of Hattin and a siege that lasted more than a year. Saladin's younger brother, Al-Adil, was governor of the district until becoming ruler of Egypt and Syria in 1199. Yaqut (1179–1229) noted that "Al Karak is a very strongly fortified castle on the borders of Syria, towards Balka province, and in the mountains. It stands on a rock surrounded by Wadis, except on the side towards the suburb." Al-Dimashqi (1256–1327) noted that Karak: "is an impregnable fortress, standing high on the summit of a mountain. Its fosses are the valleys around it, which are very deep. They say it was originally, in Roman days, a convent, and was turned into a fortress. It is now a treasure house of the Turks." Abu'l-Fida (1273−1331) noted that Al Karak "is a celebrated town with a very high fortress, one of the most unassailable of the fortresses of Syria. About a day's march from it is Mutah, where are the tombs of Ja'afar at Tayyar and his companions. Below Al Karak is a valley, in which is a thermal bath (hammam), and many gardens with "excellent" fruits, such as apricots, pears, pomegranates, and others."

Al-Karak was the birthplace of Ibn al-Quff (1233–1286), an Arab Christian physician and surgeon, author of the earliest medieval Arabic treatise intended solely for surgeons.

In 1355, Ibn Battuta wrote: "Al Karak is one of the strongest and most celebrated fortresses of Syria. It is called also Hisn al Ghurab (the Crow's Fortress), and is surrounded on every side by ravines. There is only one gateway, and that enters by a passage tunnelled in the live rock, which tunnel forms a sort of hall. We stayed four days outside Karak, at a place called Ath Thaniyyah.

The castle served as a place of exile and power base during the Mamluk Sultanate. Its significance lay in its control over the caravan route between Damascus and Egypt and the pilgrimage route between Damascus and Mecca. In the thirteenth century, the Mamluk ruler Baibars used it during his ascent to power. In 1389 Sultan Barquq was exiled to al-Karak, where he gathered his supporters before returning to Cairo.

=== Ottoman period ===
In 1596 Al-Karak appeared in the Ottoman tax registers, situated in the nahiya (subdistrict) of Karak, part of the Sanjak of Ajlun. It had 78 households and 2 bachelors who were Muslim, and 103 households and 8 bachelors who were Christian. They paid a fixed tax-rate of 25% on agricultural products, including wheat, barley, olive trees/vineyards/fruit trees, a special product (bayt al–mal), goats and bee-hives; in addition to occasional revenues, for a water mill, and a market toll. Their total tax was 15,000 akçe.

Al-Karak was inhabited by the Majali tribe, the Tarawneh tribe and the Maaitah tribe.

In 1844 Ibrahim Pasha of Egypt sent an expedition west of the Dead Sea. His troops occupied the castle at al-Karak but they were starved out with much loss of life.

Mohammed Al-Majali who had control of Al-Karak in 1868, was involved in the events that led to the destruction of the Moabite Stone.

In 1893, the Sublime Porte Abdul Hamid II established the sub-province of Ma'an, with a resident governor (mutasarif) in Al-Karak, under the Wāli of Syria based in Damascus. One of the first governors, 1895, was Hussein Helmy Bey Effendi (see also Hüseyin Hilmi Pasha), aged 40, formerly the General Secretary at Damascus. He ruled with a garrison of 1,200 troops, in 3 regiments, mostly conscripts from West of the River Jordan doing their three years of military service. There were also 200 Circassian cavalry. One of his achievements was the disarming of the local population. He also established a Military Hospital with a Jewish doctor; enforced the regulation of coinage and weights and measures; introduced a weekly postal service to Jerusalem, Damascus and Ma'an; and set up agricultural projects such as the planting of 5,000 grape vines at Madeba.

One estimate of the population of the town and the surrounding area at this time gives a total of 10,000. Of these, 8000 were Muslims and 2,000 were Orthodox Christians whose Church, St George, had been built in 1849. The Latin Mission was established in 1874 and in 1886 Al Majali gave permission to the English Mission to work in the town. The town's Orthodox school had 120 boys and 60 girls. The same source notes that the town's Mufti had been educated in Hebron and al Azhar, Cairo, and that there was a newly built mosque. Merchants from Damascus came to the town twice each year.

==== Karak revolt and Arab Revolt ====
The Karak revolt erupted on 4 December 1910 as the governor of Damascus attempted to apply the same measures of conscription, taxation, and disarmament to the inhabitants of Al-Karak that previously provoked the Hauran Druze Rebellion. The uprising ended with an indiscriminate massacre perpetrated by the governor's troops.

During the Arab Revolt (1916–1918), the Turkish Army abandoned al-Karak after Sherif Abdullah ibn Hamza led a 70 horsemen attack on Mezraa. This Ottoman naval base was rendered useless, after the destruction of the flotilla used to transport grain across the Dead Sea, on 28 January 1918.

=== British Mandate, Emirate of Transjordan ===
Following the San Remo conference, 1920, Great Britain was given a mandate to govern the area. The newly appointed High Commissioner in Jerusalem, Herbert Samuel, sent several officials east of the River Jordan to create a local administration. Major Alec Kirkbride was based in Al-Karak with a small detachment of policemen. He established what he named The National Government of Moab with himself as president. In January 1921 Emir Abdullah Hussein began assembling an army in Ma'an and announced his intention to attack the French in Syria. After a brief consultation with his superiors Kirkbride's government welcomed the arrival of the Emir. At the Cairo conference, March 1921, Abdullah was recognised by the British as ruler of Emirate of Transjordan.

In the 1920s, Al-Karak had a population of 8,000 and had the third largest urban population (after Amman and Salt with 20,000 each) in Transjordan.

=== Kingdom of Jordan ===
In 1961, the population of Karak amounted 7,422 persons, of whom 1,622 were Orthodox Christian while the remaining were Muslim.

In August 1996, there were food riots in the town after the government increased the price of bread.

The town and castle were the scene of an attack by gunmen on 18 December 2016 in which at least 19 people were killed; 13 Jordanian civilians and security forces, a Canadian tourist, and all 5 attackers.

== Climate ==
Al-Karak has a hot-summer Mediterranean climate (Köppen climate classification Csa). Most rain falls in the winter. The average annual temperature in Al-Karak is 16.5 °C (61.7 °F). About 359 mm (14.13 in) of precipitation falls annually.

Climate data for Al-Karak (Rabba) (1989–2018 normals)
Month	Jan	Feb	Mar	Apr	May	Jun	Jul	Aug	Sep	Oct	Nov	Dec	Year
Mean daily maximum °C (°F)	12.4 (54.3)	13.7 (56.7)	17.5 (63.5)	22.7 (72.9)	27.1 (80.8)	30.2 (86.4)	31.8 (89.2)	32.0 (89.6)	30.3 (86.5)	27.1 (80.8)	21.0 (69.8)	15.7 (60.3)	23.7 (74.7)
Daily mean °C (°F)	7.9 (46.2)	8.7 (47.7)	11.7 (53.1)	15.8 (60.4)	19.8 (67.6)	22.8 (73.0)	24.8 (76.6)	24.9 (76.8)	23.1 (73.6)	20.3 (68.5)	15.0 (59.0)	10.4 (50.7)	17.1 (62.8)
Mean daily minimum °C (°F)	3.3 (37.9)	3.7 (38.7)	5.9 (42.6)	8.8 (47.8)	12.5 (54.5)	15.4 (59.7)	17.7 (63.9)	17.8 (64.0)	15.9 (60.6)	13.4 (56.1)	9.0 (48.2)	5.1 (41.2)	10.7 (51.3)
Average precipitation mm (inches)	90.9 (3.58)	78.3 (3.08)	46.3 (1.82)	15.7 (0.62)	5.6 (0.22)	0.0 (0.0)	0.0 (0.0)	0.0 (0.0)	0.1 (0.00)	8.7 (0.34)	24.3 (0.96)	53.7 (2.11)	323.7 (12.74)
Average relative humidity (%)	74.2	70.4	64.1	52.5	45.7	46.9	49.0	53.0	56.8	57.5	62.1	69.6	58.5
Source: Jordan Meteorological Department

== Demographics ==
Al-Karak's metropolitan population was estimated to be 68,800 in 2013, making up 31.5% of the total population of the Karak Governorate. Most of the population of the city is Muslim (75%) and there is also a significant Orthodox Christian population (25%). In general, the percentage of Christians in al-Karak is among the highest in Jordan.

== Cuisine ==
Al-Karak is famous for its traditional Jordanian lamb dish called mansaf.

== Gallery ==
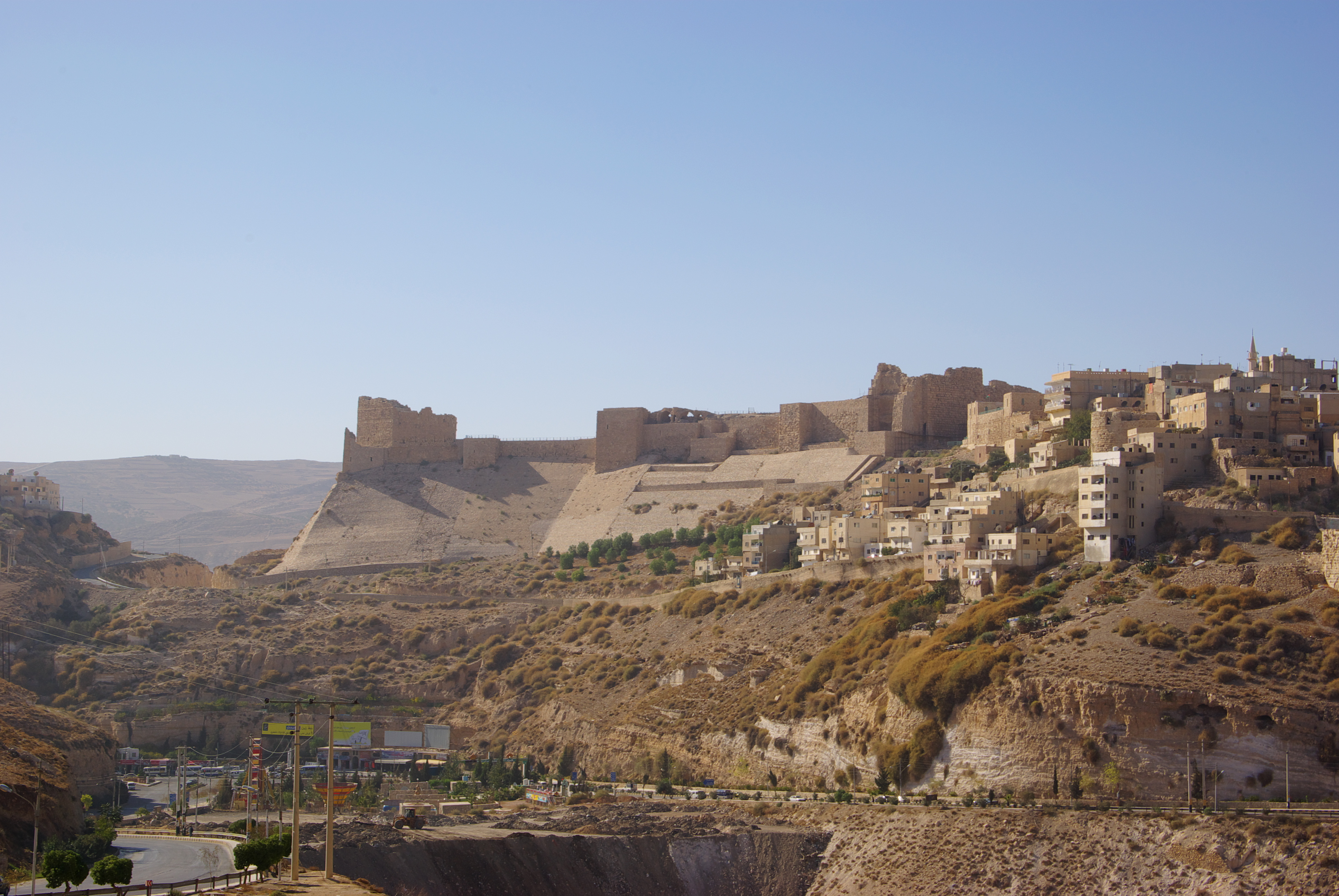
Karak is known for its crusader castle, one of the largest castles in the region

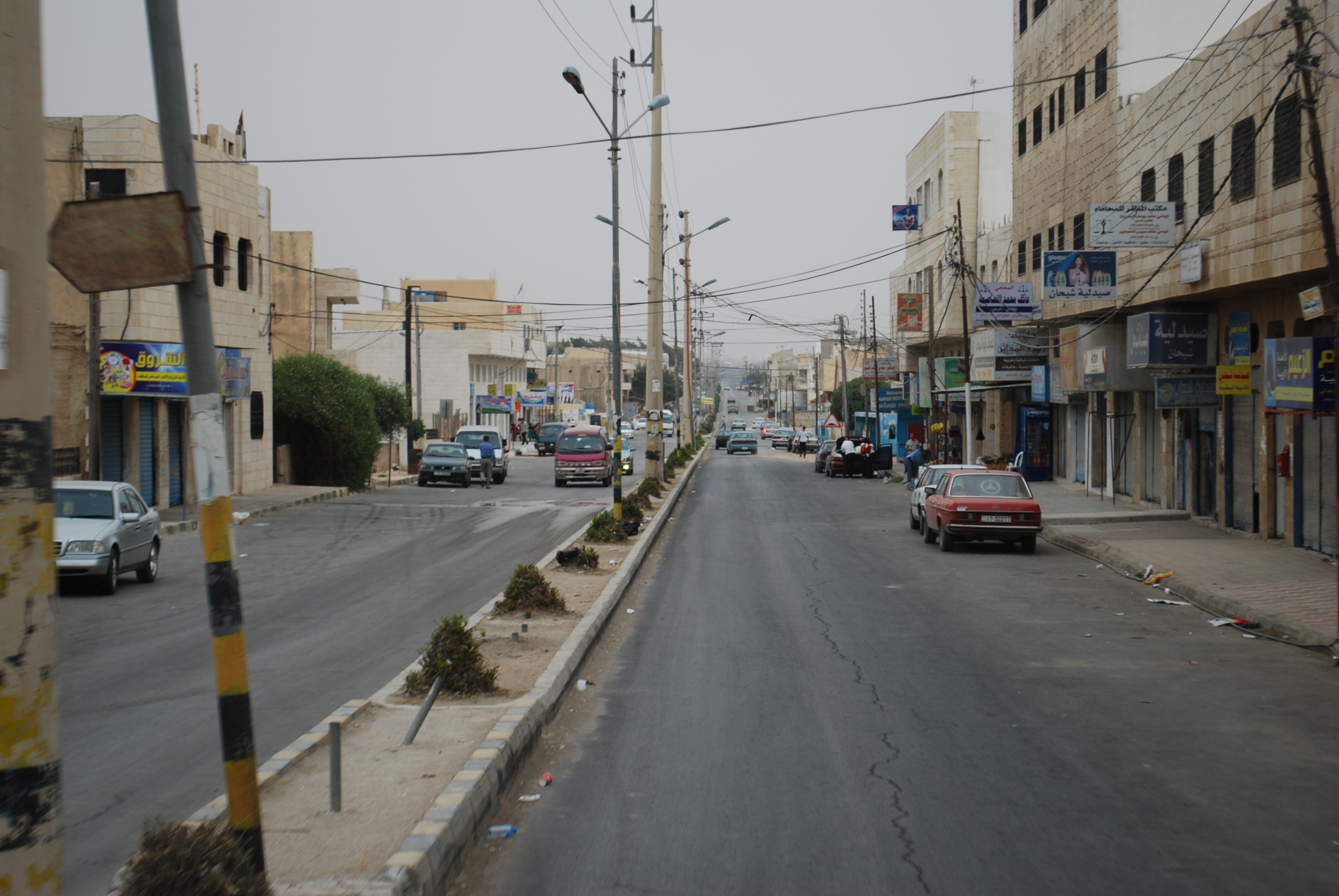
A street in al-Karak

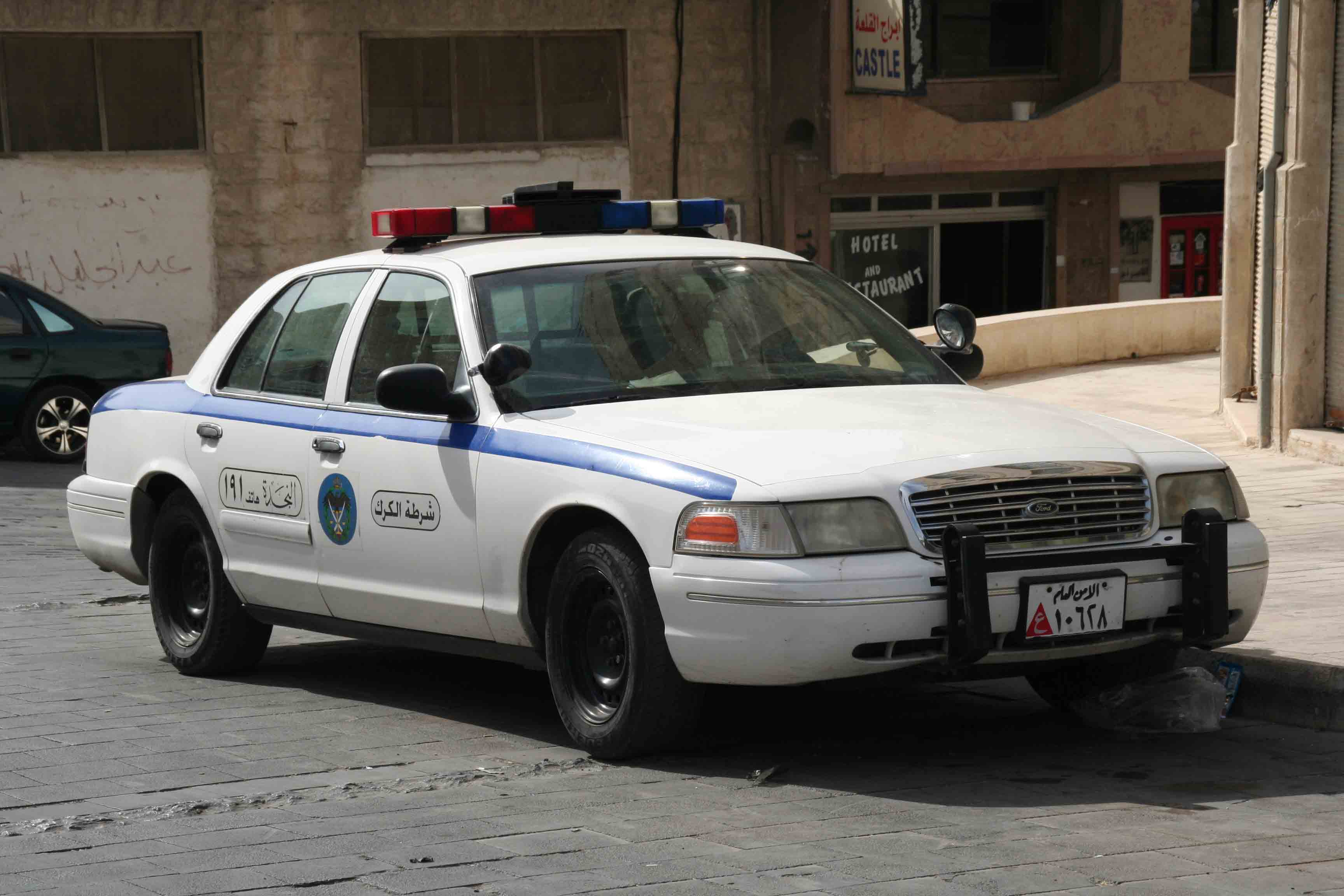
An al-Karak city police vehicle

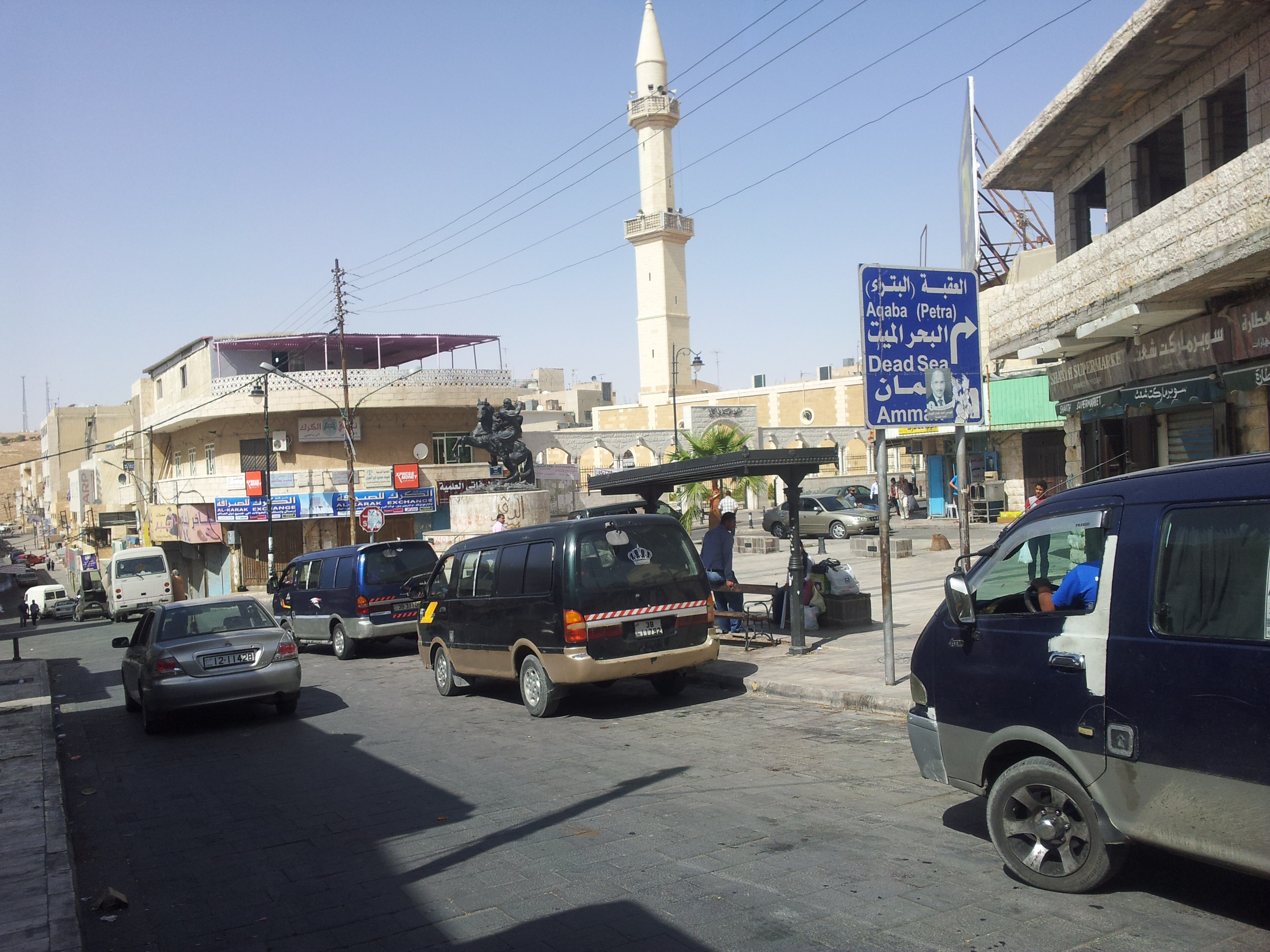
Mosque

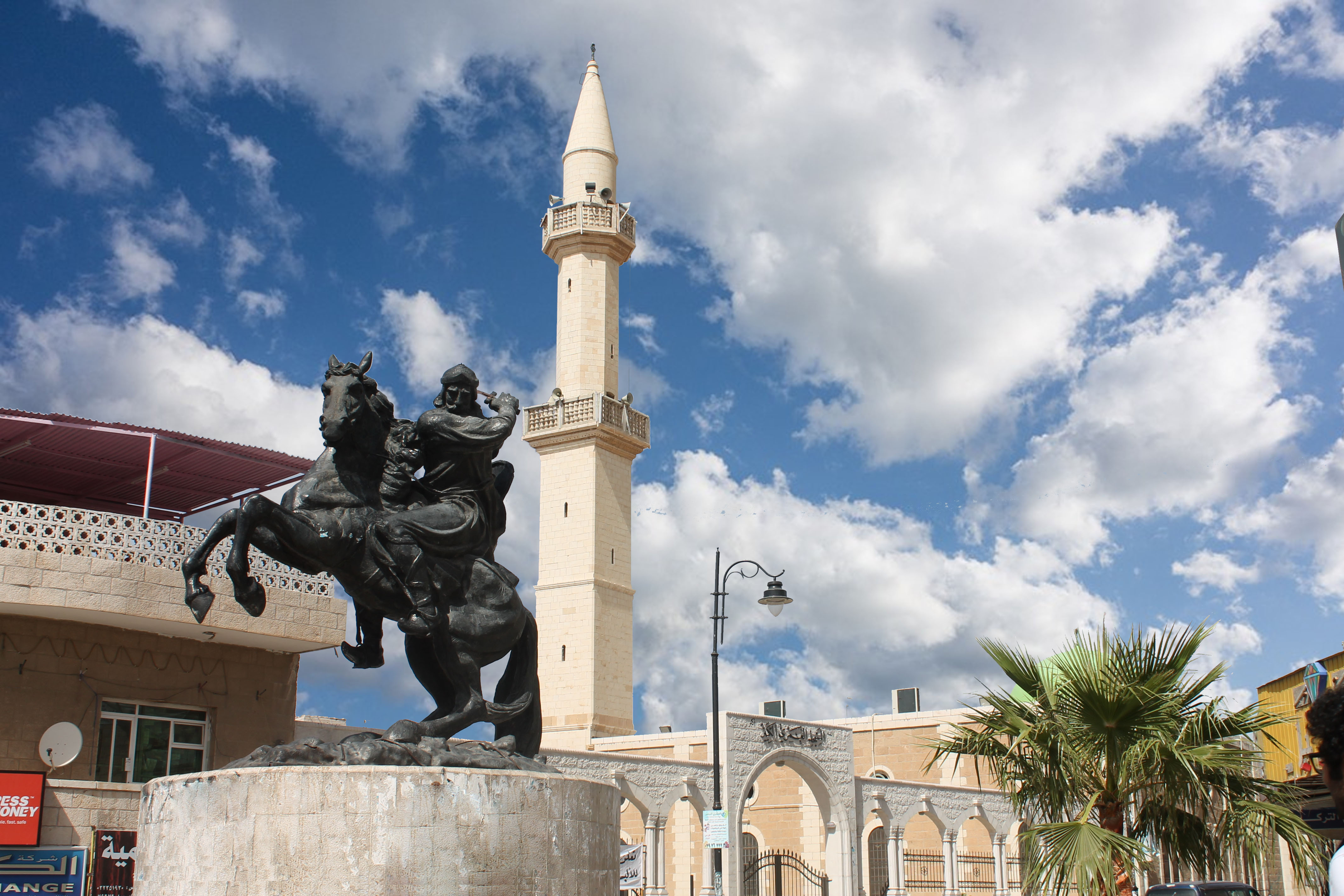
A statue of Saladin and mosque behind in the city center

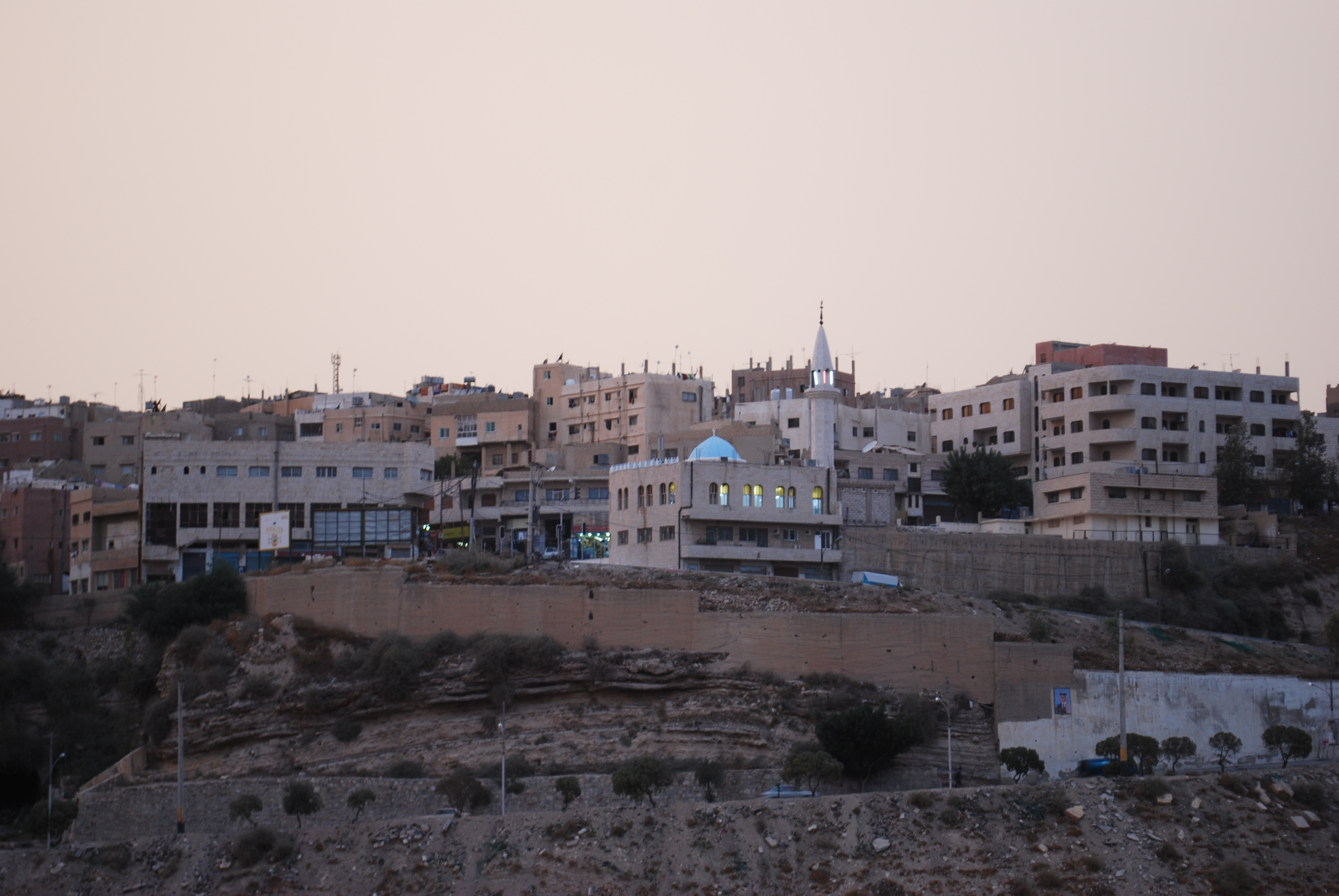

== Notable people ==
- Muath al-Kasasbeh, Royal Jordanian Air Force pilot captured, held hostage, and burned alive in Syria in January 2015 by the ISIS

== See also ==
- Jordan River
- Madaba

== Bibliography ==
- Bliss, F.J. (1895). "Narrative of an Expedition to Moab and Gilead in March, 1895". Quarterly Statement - Palestine Exploration Fund. 27: 203–235.
- Doughtey, C.M. (1921). Travels in Arabia Deserta. London: P.L. Warner.
- Dowling, T.E. (1896). "Kerak in 1896". Quarterly Statement - Palestine Exploration Fund. 28: 327–332.
- Government of Jordan, Department of Statistics (1964). First Census of Population and Housing. Volume I: Final Tables; General Characteristics of the Population (PDF).
- Gubser, Peter (1973). Politics & Change in Al-Karak, Jordan, A Study of a Small Arab Town & Its District. ISBN 0-19-215805-8.
- Hill, G. (1896). "A journey east of the Jordan and the Dead Sea, 1895". Quarterly Statement - Palestine Exploration Fund. 28: 24–47.
- Hitti, P.K. (1970). History of the Arabs. Macmillan. ISBN 0-333-09871-4.
- Holt, P.M. (1986). The Age of the Crusades. The Near East from the Eleventh century to 1517. Longman. ISBN 0-582-49302-1.
- Hütteroth, W.-D.; Abdulfattah, K. (1977). Historical Geography of Palestine, Transjordan and Southern Syria in the Late 16th Century. Erlanger Geographische Arbeiten, Sonderband 5. Erlangen, Germany: Vorstand der Fränkischen Geographischen Gesellschaft. ISBN 3-920405-41-2.
- Irby, C.L.; Mangles, J. (1823). Travels in Egypt and Nubia, Syria, and Asia Minor; during the years 1817 & 1818. London: Printed for Private Distribution by T. White & Co. (pp. 361, 444, 456)
- Le Strange, G. (1890). Palestine Under the Moslems: A Description of Syria and the Holy Land from A.D. 650 to 1500. Committee of the Palestine Exploration Fund.
- Pringle, D. (1993). The Churches of the Crusader Kingdom of Jerusalem: A-K (excluding Acre and Jerusalem). Vol. I. Cambridge University Press. ISBN 0-521-39036-2. (pp. 286−295)
- Pringle, D. (1997). Secular buildings in the Crusader Kingdom of Jerusalem: an archaeological Gazetteer. Cambridge University Press. ISBN 0521-46010-7. (pp. 59− 60)
- Runciman, S. (1951). A history of the Crusades. Volume II. The Kingdom of Jerusalem and the Frankish East. 1100-1187. Cambridge University Press. ISBN 0-521-06162-8.
- Saulcy, L.F. de (1854). Narrative of a journey round the Dead Sea, and in the Bible lands, in 1850 and 1851. Vol. 1, new edition. London: R. Bentley. (pp. 368 ff)
- Sykes, C. (1965). Cross Roads to Israel: Palestine from Balfour to Bevin. New English Library Edition (pb) 1967.
- Tristram, H.B. (1873). The land of Moab; travels and discoveries on the east side of the Dead sea and the Jordan. New York: Harper and brothers.
