= Al Farooq Omar Bin Al Khattab Mosque =

Mosque in Dubai, United Arab Emirates

Al Farooq Omar Bin Al Khattab Mosque Centre
- Location in the UAE

Religion
- Affiliation: Islam

Location
- Location: Dubai, U.A.E.
- Interactive map of Al Farooq Omar Bin Al Khattab Mosque Centre
- Coordinates: 25.171°N 55.233°E

Architecture
- Type: Mosque
- Completed: 2011

Specifications
- Capacity: over 2,000
- Dome: 21 domes
- Minaret: 4
- Minaret height: 60 m (197 ft)
- Site area: 93,400 sq ft (8,680 m^{2})

Website
- www.alfarooqcentre.com

The Al Farooq Omar Bin Al Khattab Mosque (Arabic: مسجد ومركز الفاروق عمر بن الخطاب) is a mosque located in Dubai, United Arab Emirates. The mosque is named after Umar bin Al Khattab, a companion of Muhammad who became the second Caliph after Abu Bakr and was given the title Al Farooq, meaning someone who distinguished truth from falsehood. The original Al Farooq Omar Bin Al Khattab Mosque was established on the same site in 1986.

The Al Farooq Omar Bin Al Khattab Mosque can accommodate 2,000 worshipers.

== Design ==
The main dome rises to approximately 30 metres in height. There are also 15 smaller domes with four additional half domes surrounding the main one.

The mosque is 4,200 square metres in area.
