= Mausoleum of Abdullah ibn Rawahah =

Mausoleum in the Karak Governorate of Jordan

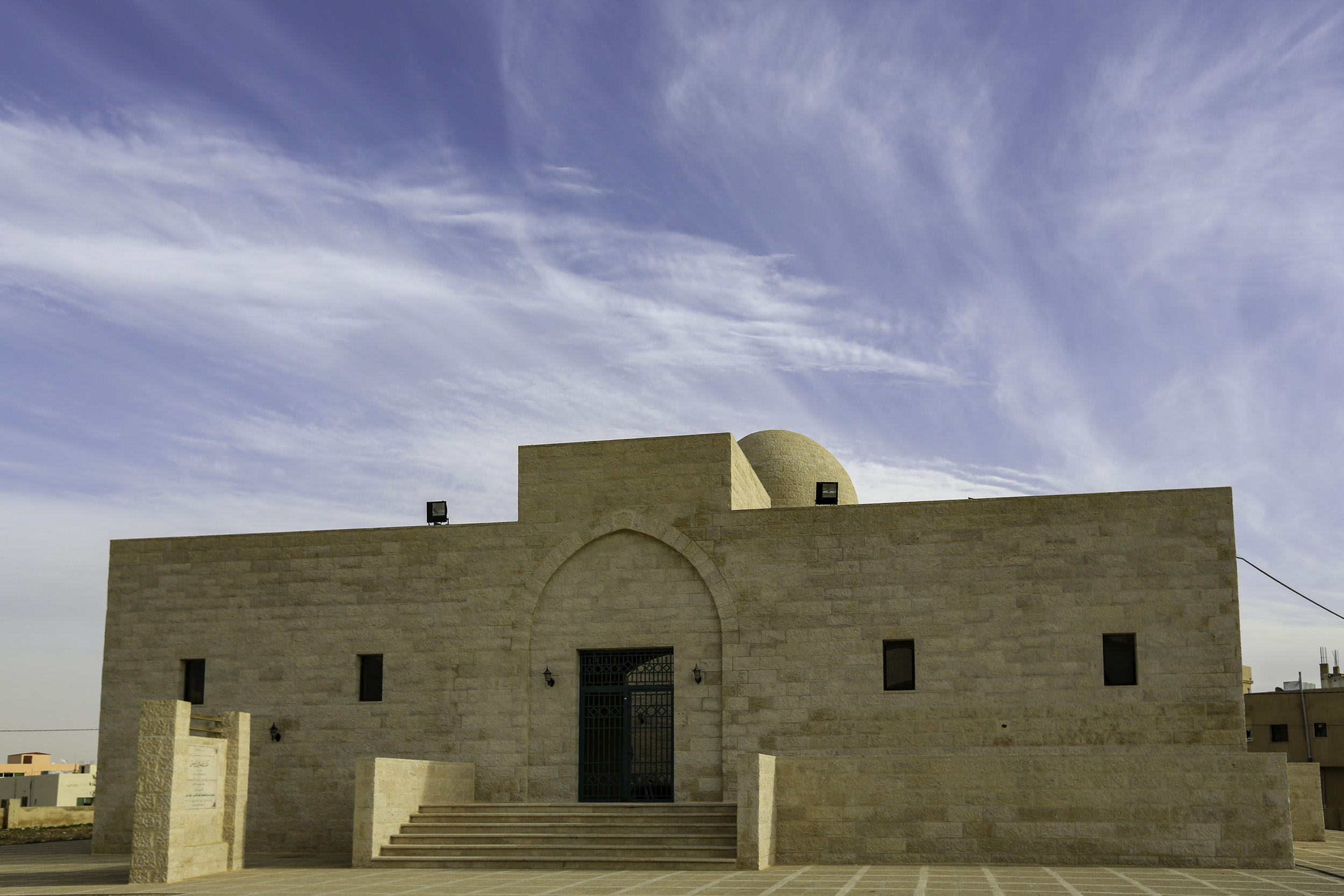
- Interactive map of Mausoleum of Abdullah ibn Rawahah
- Type: Mausoleum
- Location: Al-Mazar, Karak Governorate, Jordan
- Coordinates: 31°03′58″N 35°41′56″E
- Built: 13th century
- Built for: Abdullah ibn Rawahah
- Restored: 1997
- Architectural style: Mamluk architecture
- Governing body: Provincial government of Karak Governorate

The Mausoleum of Abdullah ibn Rawahah (Arabic: ضريح عبد الله بن رواحة) is a mausoleum located in the Al-Mazar district of Karak, Jordan. Founded by the Mamluk ruler Baybars in the 13th century, it is dedicated to Abdullah ibn Rawahah, one of the early companions of the Islamic prophet Muhammad who was buried in the area.

== History ==
Abdullah ibn Rawahah was a poet from the Banu Khazraj tribe and was one of the earliest followers of the Islamic prophet Muhammad after the latter's migration to the city of Medina in the 7th century. He was well known in Islamic tradition for his poetry that defended the religion, as well as his expedition against the Jews of Khaybar. Along with Ja'far ibn Abi Talib, Abdullah was slain in 629 whilst fighting against Byzantine and Ghassanid joint forces in the Battle of Mu'tah. Years later, during Mamluk rule in the 13th century, Baybars ordered the construction of a mausoleum over the grave of Abdullah, which was located in the vicinity of the larger Mausoleum of Ja'far ibn Abi Talib. In the 20th century, the shrine fell into disrepair, so it was renovated in 1965 and later fully rebuilt in 1997.

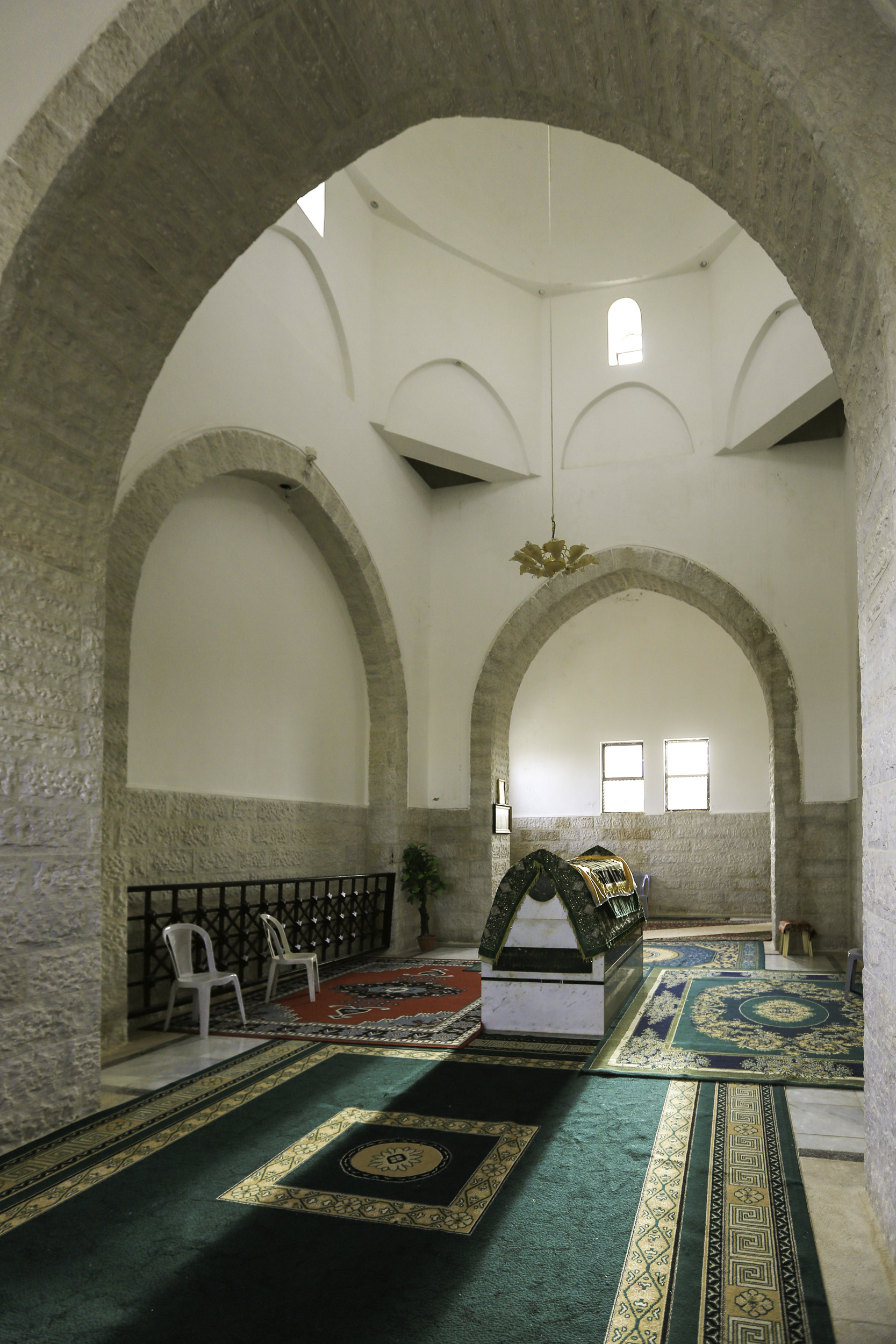
The tomb of Abdullah ibn Rawahah inside the central chamber of the mausoleum

The mausoleum was the only shrine in Al-Mazar that was not attacked by hardliner vandals in 2013, due to the fact that it was a Sunni establishment not visited by Shi'as.

== Architecture ==
The mausoleum is rectangular in layout, with a dome on a drum topping the central chamber which contains the tomb of Abdullah ibn Rawahah. The entrance to the building is met with a cemented floor and pathway that leads into a park and walking further ahead to an entrance of the nearby Mausoleum of Ja'far ibn Abi Talib. The exterior of the mausoleum is made of large, white sandstone bricks that give the mausoleum a distinct appearance and texture from that of Ja'far and Zayd. A further feature distinguishing this mausoleum from the other two is that unlike them, the grave here is not enclosed with an ornate lattice zarih.

Additional rooms inside the mausoleum include a multi-purpose hall, a library, and a madrasa, while a garden with fountains stands in the courtyard of the mausoleum.

== See also ==
- Mausoleum of Ja'far ibn Abi Talib
- Islam in Jordan
