= Mutah =

Mutah may refer to:

- Nikah mut'ah, a temporary marriage in some branches of Shia Islam
- Mu'tah, a town in Jordan and site of:
  - the 7th-century Battle of Mu'tah
  - Mutah University

== See also ==
- Muta (disambiguation)
