= Mausoleum of Ja'far ibn Abi Talib =

Islamic religious complex in Jordan

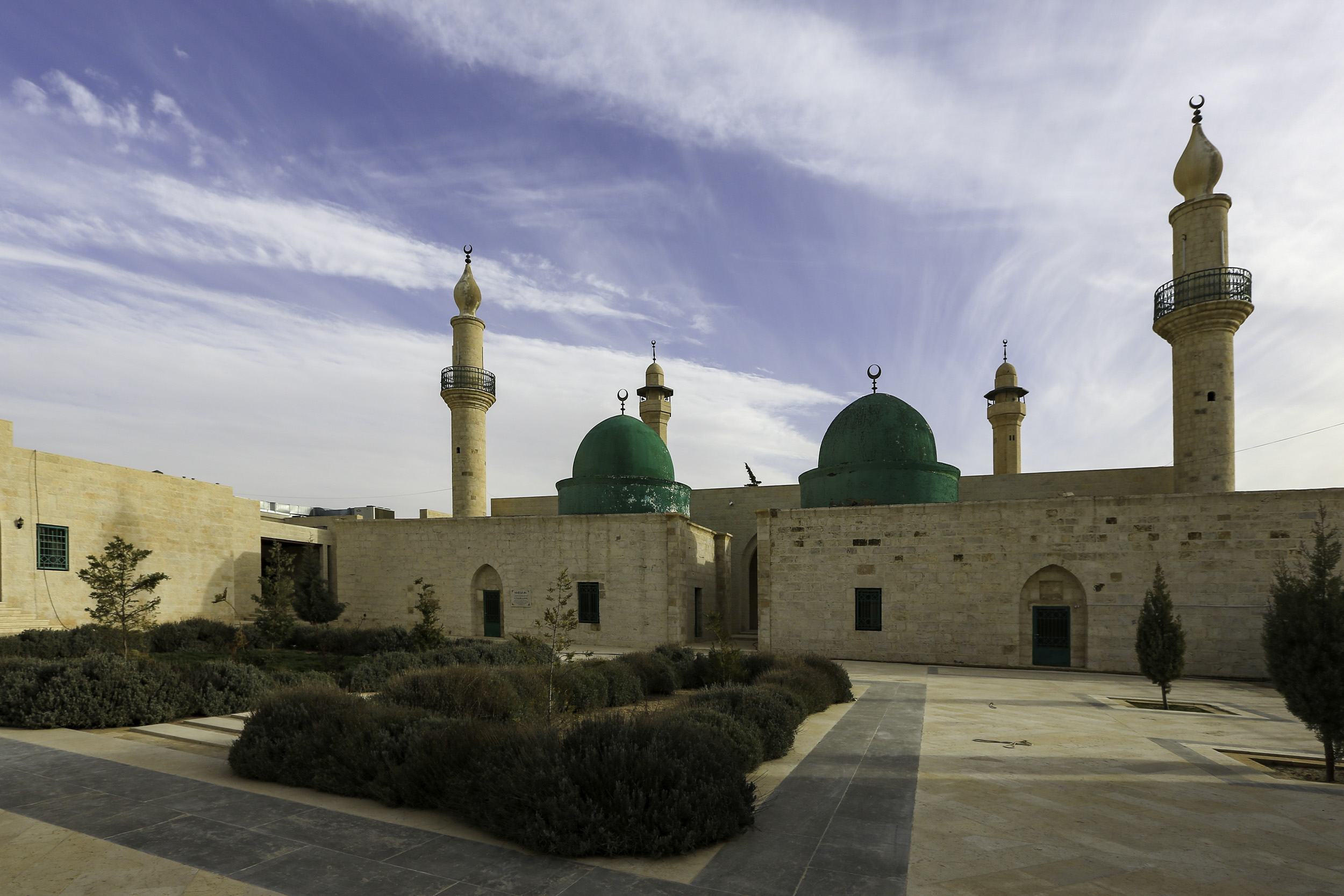

- Location in Jordan

Religion
- Affiliation: Sunni Islam

Location
- Location: 3M8W+77 Al-Mazar, Jordan
- Country: Jordan
- Coordinates: 31°03′59″N 35°41′44″E

Architecture
- Type: Islamic religious complex (including mosque and mausoleums)
- Style: Mamluk architecture
- Founder: Baybars (mausoleum); Hussein bin Talal (current structure)
- Completed: c. 13th century (original structure); 1997 (current structure)

Specifications
- Dome: 8
- Minaret: 4
- Shrine: 2

The Mausoleum of Ja'far ibn Abi Talib (Arabic: ضريح جعفر بن أبي طالب) is an Islamic religious complex located in the Al-Mazar district of Karak, Jordan. It primarily comprises the mausoleum of the building's namesake, a mosque, a madrasa and the mausoleum of Zayd ibn Harithah.

== History ==
Ja'far ibn Abi Talib and Zayd ibn Harithah were both prominent 7th-century Sahaba and were amongst the first followers of the Islamic prophet Muhammad. Both of them were killed in the year 629 while fighting against the joint forces of the Byzantines and their Ghassanid vassals in the Battle of Mu'tah. In the 13th century, the Mamluk ruler Baybars commissioned the first mausoleums to be built atop the graves of both men. Further reconstructions to the mausoleums took place in the 1930s, although it would not be until 1971 that plans were made to build other religious facilities attached to the mausoleums. With the permission of Hussein bin Talal (r. 1952–1999), the contemporarily reigning King of Jordan, a new Islamic religious complex was built around the mausoleums in 1997.

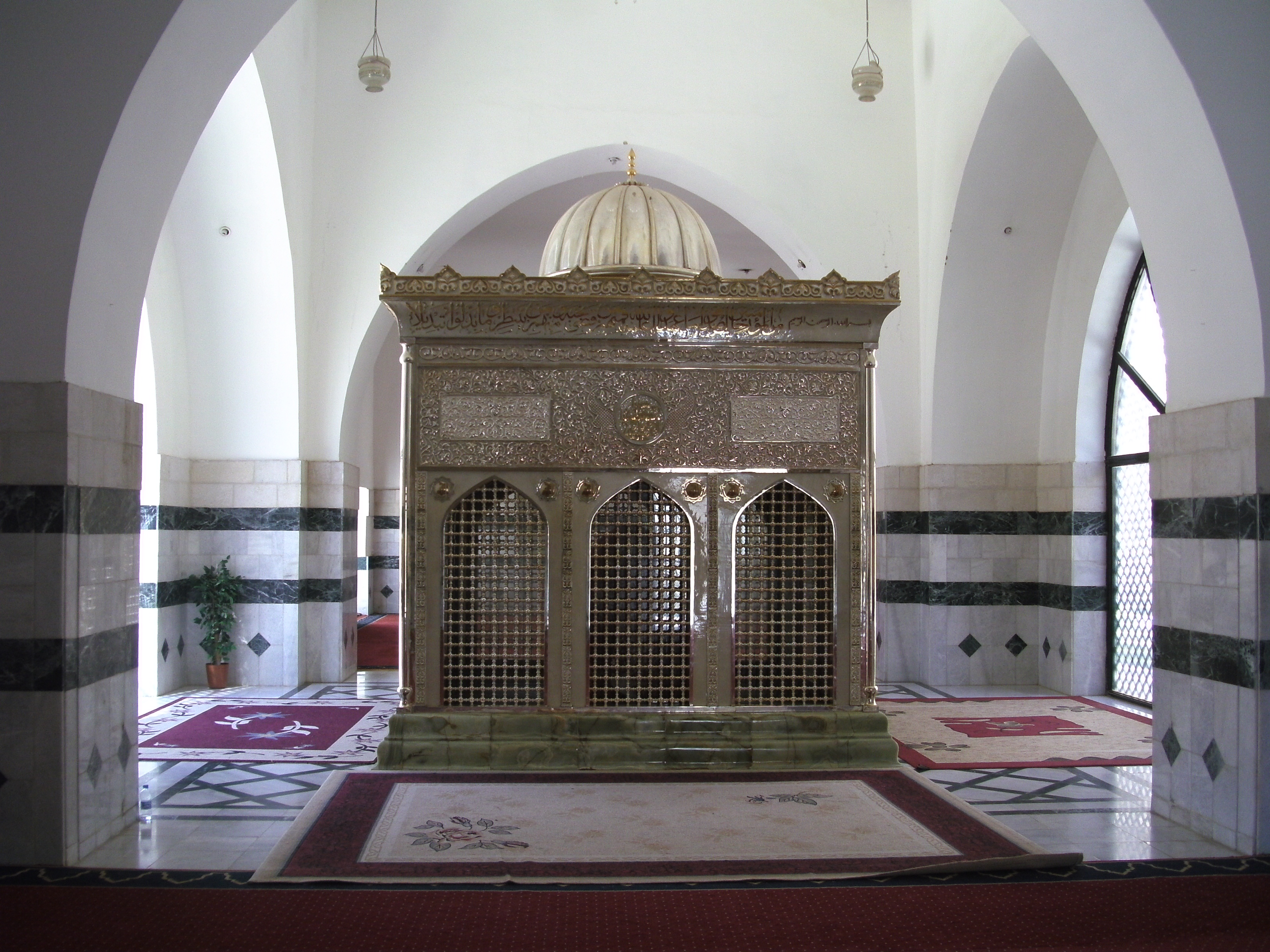
The tomb of Ja'far in the religious complex.

The shrine of Ja'far ibn Abi Talib was attacked by vandals in May 2013, although the damage was later restored by early June; the shrine was reportedly targeted due to allowing Shi'a pilgrims, despite the mosque being a Sunni Islamic affiliated institution.

== Architecture ==
The religious complex consists of a modern mosque building, as well as the Mamluk-period mausoleums of Ja'far and Zayd. The mosque building is built from white sandstone and is rectangular in layout, with a courtyard in front of it, while a large white dome on an octagonal base tops the main prayer hall. It has two large minarets that flank the building. A small clinic can be found in the northwestern corner of the mosque, while ablution facilities and toilets are situated in the eastern parts of the mosque.

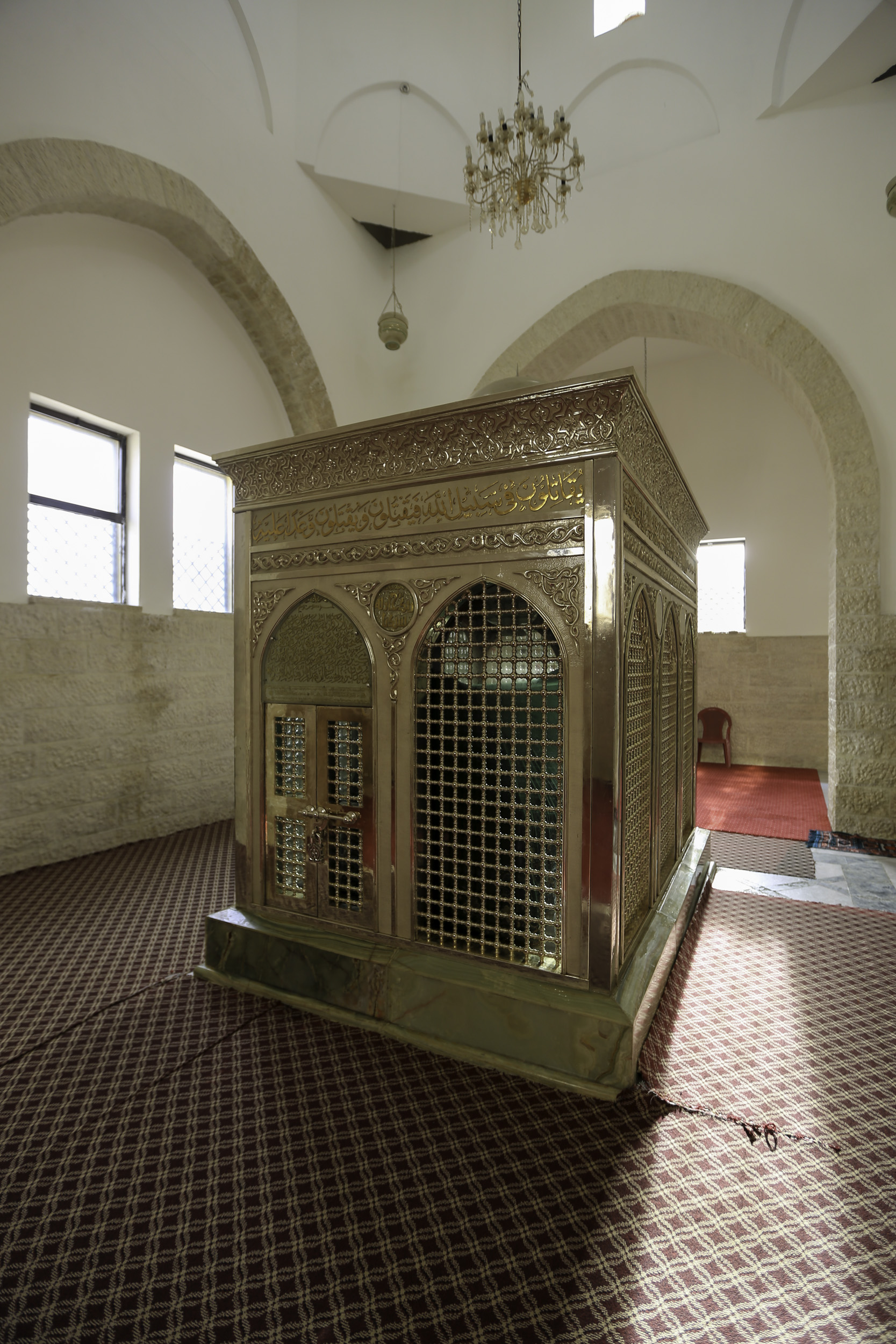
The tomb of Zayd inside the complex.

The mausoleums of Ja'far and Zayd are separated from the main mosque building, although all three buildings are situated in the same fenced enclosure, with the mausoleum of Ja'far in the northwestern side and that of Zayd in the eastern side. This is to ensure that the functions of the mosque are not interrupted by visitors who only intend to visit the mausoleums of the saints without praying in the mosque. A dome tops both mausoleums, while the grave of each holy man is situated in the centre of their respective mausoleums. Both graves are each covered with an ornate lattice zarih that was a donation from Mohammed Burhanuddin, the 52nd Da'i of the Dawoodi Bohra community.

Ancillary buildings in the complex include a madrasa, library, as well as residences for the mosque personnel (including the Imam and muezzin) and administrative offices. There are also commercial stores to fund the upkeep of the mosque and the mausoleums.

== Other locations ==
There is a shrine for Ja'far ibn Abi Talib located in Isfahan, Iran, known as the Imamzadeh Ja'far. Built during the Ilkhanid period and renovated during Safavid rule, the shrine is a hexagonal tower-tomb, which is topped by a flat, circular dome. The attribution of this tomb to Ja'far ibn Abi Talib is very dubious, with academic historian and researcher Hoseyn Yaghoubi speculating that this tomb was originally a pyramidal-roofed Ilkhanid general's tomb that was later reappropriated into a domed shrine for Ja'far in the Safavid period to legitimize Persia as a capital for Shi'ism.

== See also ==
- List of mosques in Jordan
