= Muta =

Muta may refer to:

== Acronyms ==
- MUTA, an acronym for the Mechanics' Union of Trade Associations
- MUTA, an acronym for Male Urogenital Teaching Associate, in medical education
- MUTA, an abbreviation in the United States Army Reserve for a "Multiple Unit Training Assembly" (multiple refers not to multiple units but the multiple pay periods (usually four) for which reserve component soldiers receive credit for attending Battle Assembly)
- MUTA, an abbreviation for Murray Bridge Training Area in South Australia, used by the Australian Army

== Places ==
- Municipality of Muta, in Slovenia
- Muta, Muta, a settlement in Slovenia
- Mu'tah, a town in Jordan and site of the 7th-century Battle of Mu'tah
- Pagoda of Fogong Temple, known as Muta, a wooden pagoda in Shanxi Province, China

== People ==
- Muta (surname) (including a list of people with the name)
- Muta of Daylam (died 640s), an Iranian king
- Keiji Mutoh (born 1962), Japanese wrestler known as The Great Muta
- Miroslav Nikolić (born 1956), Serbian professional basketball coach

== Other uses ==
- Muta (deity), the personification of silence in Roman mythology
- Muta, the short-name of the unit type Mutalisk from the video game StarCraft
- Nikah mut'ah, a temporary marriage in Islam
- Mut'ah of Hajj, relaxation between the lesser and greater Hajj
- Muta, a character in The Cat Returns
- Muta, a 1930s slang term for marijuana
- Muta scale used informally for measuring blood loss in wrestling

== See also ==
- Carnival of Venice#Moretta/servetta muta for the servetta muta, a carnival mask (sometimes shortened to muta)
