= Jumada I =

Fifth month of the Islamic calendar

- Native name: جُمَادَى ٱلْأُولَى (Arabic)
- Calendar: Islamic calendar
- Month number: 5
- Number of days: 29–30 (depends on actual observation of the moon's crescent)

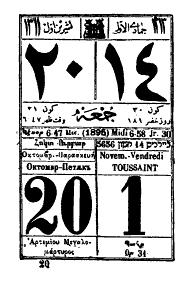
Calendar of 1895 from Ottoman-ruled Thessaloniki, a cosmopolitan city The first three lines are in the Ottoman Turkish language, the 4th and 5th on the left in Armenian language, the 5th on the right in "Hebrew-Spanish" (Ladino), the 6th on the left in Greek (Οκτομβρ-Παρασκευή, Αρτεμίου Μεγαλο-μάρτυρος / October - Friday, (date on which is the celebration of) Artemios the Martyr) and the 7th in Bulgarian, the French is for the Western Europeans. The calendars used are the Rumi (20 Teşrin-i Evvel 1311, i.e. the Julian calendar date in Turkish), the Islamic (14 Jumādā al-Ūlā 1313), the Hebrew (14 Cheshvan 5656), the Julian (October 20) and the Gregorian (November 1st).

Jumada I (Arabic: جُمَادَى ٱلْأُولَى, romanized: Jumādā l-ʾŪlā, (Note: Arabic pronunciation: [d͡ʒuˈmaːda‿lˈʔuːlaː].) lit. 'Jumada the First') is the fifth month of the Islamic calendar. Jumada I spans 29 or 30 days. The origin of the month's name is theorized by some as coming from the word jamād (Arabic: جماد), meaning "arid, dry, or cold", denoting the dry and parched land and hence the dry months of the pre-Islamic Arabian calendar. Jumādā (Arabic: جُمَادَى) may also be related to a verb meaning "to freeze", and another account relates that water would freeze during this time of year. The secondary name Jumādā l-ʾŪlā may possibly mean "to take charge with, commend, entrust, commit or care during the arid or cold month". However, this explanation is rejected by some as Jumādā al-ʾŪlā is a lunar month that does not coincide with seasons as solar months do.

In Turkish, the name of the month is cemaziyelevvel (from Ottoman Turkish: جمادی الاول, romanized: cemaziyü'l-evvel); it was abbreviated as جا ca in Ottoman Turkish.

== Timing ==
The Islamic calendar is a purely lunar calendar, and months begin when the first crescent of a new moon is sighted. Since the Islamic lunar year is 11 to 12 days shorter than the tropical year, Jumada I migrates backwards throughout the seasons in a cycle of about 33 solar years. The estimated start and end dates for Jumada I are as follows (based on the Umm al-Qura calendar of Saudi Arabia:)

Jumada I dates between 2024 and 2028
AH	First day (CE/AD)	Last day (CE/AD)
1446	3 November 2024	2 December 2024
1447	23 October 2025	21 November 2025
1448	12 October 2026	10 November 2026
1449	1 October 2027	30 October 2027
1450	20 September 2028	18 October 2028

== Islamic events ==
- On 1 Jumada I 8 AH (September 629), the Battle of Mu'ta took place in the village of the same name (in present-day Jordan), in which the Muslim army (dispatched by Muhammad) fought against the army of the Byzantine Empire and their Ghassanid vassals reportedly in retribution for the murder of a Muslim emissary by a Ghassanid chief, Shurahbil ibn Amr. The battle was won by the Byzantines, and amongst the losses the Muslims incurred were three of the most prominent Companions of Muhammad: Zayd ibn Haritha (his adopted son, known as the fourth person to become a Muslim); Ja‘far ibn Abi Talib (his cousin), and ‘Abd Allah ibn Rawaha (present at the second pledge at al-‘Aqaba), whom Muhammad had specifically appointed to be generals of the Muslim army in the battle, so that if one of them should be killed, the other would take his place.
- On 5 Jumada I, Zaynab bint Ali was born.
- On 8 Jumada I, Amir al-Kulal died. Amir Kulal.
- On 10 Jumada I 11 AH, Fatima, daughter of Muhammad, died in Medina at the young age of 23 years according to Sunni Muslim sources.
- On 13 Jumada I 11 AH, Fatima was buried by her husband Ali.
- On 15 Jumada I, Ali ibn Husayn was born.
- On 20 Jumada I 857, Mehmed II conquered Constantinople.

== See also ==
- Jumada II
