= Wahb ibn Sa'd =

Companion (Sahabi) of Muhammad

Wahb ibn Sa'd ibn Abi Sarh
- Born: Mecca
- Died: 8 AH (629 CE); Mu'tah, Byzantine Empire (present-day Jordan)
- Cause of death: Shahid in the Battle of Mu'tah
- Known for: Companion of the Islamic prophet Muhammad
- Parents: Sa'd ibn Abi Sarh (father); Muhana bint Jabir al-Ash'ariyyah (mother)
- Relatives: Abdallah ibn Sa'd (brother)

Wahb ibn Saʿd ibn Abī Sarḥ (Arabic: وهب بن سعد بن أبي سرح; died in the year 8 AH (629 CE) was a companion of the Islamic prophet Muhammad. He embraced Islam and then moved to Yathrib, and visited the house of Kulthum ibn al-Hadm. Wahb also witnessed the Battle of Uhud, the Battle of the Trench, the Battle of Khaybar, and Treaty of Hudaybiyyah, and was killed in the Battle of Mu'tah in Jumada al-awwal in 8 AH, at the age of 40 years. He was the brother of Abdallah ibn Sa'd, whose mother was Muhana bint Jabir al-Ash'ariyyah.
