= Abd Allah ibn Sa'd =

Arab governor of Egypt from 646 to 656

Governor of Egypt
- In office 646–656
- Preceded by: Amr ibn al-As
- Succeeded by: Muhammad ibn Abi Hudhayfa

Personal details
- Relations: Wahb (brother)
- Parent(s): Sa'd ibn Abi Sarh (father); Muhana bint Jabir al-Ash'ariyya

Military service
- Allegiance: Rashidun Caliphate
- Battles/wars: Muslim conquest of the Maghreb: Battle of Sufetula (647); Muslim conquest of Egypt: Second Battle of Dongola (652); Arab–Byzantine wars: Battle of the Masts (654)

Abd Allah ibn Sa'd ibn Abi al-Sarh (Arabic: عبد الله ابن سعد ابن أبي السرح, romanized: ʿAbd Allāh ibn Saʿd ibn Abī al-Sarḥ) was an Arab administrator, scribe, and military commander, who was an early convert to Islam. He was a scriber of the Quran (كاتب الوحي) and governor of Upper Egypt for the Muslim caliphate during the reign of ʿUthmān (644–656). He was also the co-founder (with the future caliph Muʿāwiyah I) of the Islamic navy which seized Cyprus (647–649) and defeated a Byzantine fleet off Alexandria in 652.

== Origin ==
Al-Sarh came from the Banu Amir ibn Lu'ayy clan of the Quraish tribe and was an adopted brother of the caliph Uthman. After converting to Islam, he became a Companion of Muhammad and, later, a Scriber.

== During Prophet Muhammad's era ==
During his time as a scribe, Muhammad would dictate to him a revelation to be written down, as he did with other scribes. Some later Islamic chronicles report that he subsequently left Islam and returned to Mecca, expressing uncertainty about the nature of revelation. Abi Saleh, narrated from Ibn Abbas, recorded that:

"the Messenger of Allah invited him so that he could write him the revelation, so when the verse 23:12 ("And certainly did We create man from an extract of clay") was revealed, the Prophet called Ibn Abi al-Sarh, and dictated it to him and when the Prophet reached the end of 23:14 ("...Thus, We formed him into a new creation") Abdullâh said in amazement ("فتبارک اللّٰہ احسن الخالقین So blessed be Allah, the Best of creators!"). The Prophet said:" Write these words too (i.e., فتبارک اللّٰہ احسن الخالقین "So blessed be Allah, the Best of creators!"), as these words have also been revealed to me."

Al-Sarh claimed that this made him doubt, and he is recorded as having said: "If Muhammad is truthful then I (am also a prophet, as I also) received the revelation, and if Muhammad lied, then I say of the like of his speech (i.e. neither his speech nor mine speech are the words of Allah)". Al-Sarh further tested his doubts, with Muslim historians Waqidi, Ibn al-Athir and Tabari writing that Muhammad dictated him: "عليم حکيم" i.e. "Allah is All Knowing All-Wise", which al-Sarh deliberately wrote in the opposite order, i.e. "حکيم عليم, All-Wise All Knowing". He then recited it to Muhammad, who did not detect any changes. Waqidi wrote that "(Ibn Abi Sarh said): Muhammad didn't know what he dictated, and I wrote (in Quran) whatever I wished. And what I wrote, it was a revelation upon me, just like it was a revelation upon Muhammad."

== Scholarly Discussion of the Narrations ==
Certain narrations attributed to Ibn ʿAbbas and transmitted through Muhammad ibn al‑Saʾib al‑Kalbi (also known as Abū al‑Nadr al‑Kūfī) are considered extremely weak. Al-Qurṭubī mentions in Tafsīr (7/40) that “it was narrated by al‑Kalbi from Ibn ʿAbbas,” while al-Munawī records in Al-Fath al-Samāwī (2/612) that “it was narrated by al-Wāhidī from al‑Kalbi, from Abū Ṣāliḥ, from Ibn ʿAbbas.” The chain of transmission is criticized by scholars and is considered very weak due to al‑Kalbi’s reputation as a fabricator of hadith. Sufyān al-Thawrī reportedly stated, “Al-Kalbi said to me: Everything I narrate to you from Abū Ṣāliḥ is a lie,” and Ahmad ibn Zuhayr reported that upon asking Ahmad ibn Hanbal whether it was permissible to consult al-Kalbi’s tafsir, he replied, “No.” Classical scholars, including al-Taymī, al-Jawzajānī, and al-Hākim, declared al-Kalbi a liar, and his narrations are generally not accepted in serious tafsir or hadith scholarship.

Al-Ṭabarī, in his Tafsīr (11/533–534), narrated that the verse “And who says, ‘I will bring down [revelation] like that which Allah has sent down’” was revealed concerning ʿAbd Allāh ibn Saʿd ibn Abī Sarḥ, who used to write for the Prophet Muhammad (peace be upon him). When the Prophet dictated “Mighty and Wise,” he would write “Forgiving and Merciful,” thus altering the wording. Ibn Saʿd later apostatized, joined Quraysh, and claimed to them that he had intentionally altered the revelation, but he returned to Islam before the conquest of Mecca. Al-Ṭabarī transmitted this report through multiple chains of narration, including one via Ḥajjāj ibn Arṭāʾah from Ibn Jurayj from ʿIkrimah, and another via Asbat from Al-Suddī (Ismāʿīl ibn ʿAbd al-Raḥmān al-Qurashī al-Suddī al-Kabīr, a Tabiʿī). Both chains are considered weak: the first is criticized for being mursal (broken) and for including narrators like Ḥajjāj ibn Arṭāʾah and Ibn Jurayj, who were known to practice tadlīs (concealing weaknesses in narration) and to transmit using an ambiguous mode of reporting (‘an‘ana). The second chain through Al-Suddī is also weak because it is mursal, missing the companion link, and thus does not meet the standard criteria of authenticity.

=== Veracity of claims ===
Although al-Sarh was noted to have left Islam before later returning, the authenticity of the report claiming Muhammad had fabricated revelations has been graded as disconnected and fabricated (Mawḍūʻ) by the hadith scholars. The report was narrated by Muhammad bin al-Sa'ib al-Kalbi from Abi Saleh, who attributed it to Ibn Abbas. Al-Kalbi was unanimously deemed weak in hadith, labelled a liar and a fabricator. He was noted to be forgetful, shunned for narrating multiple fabrications, and regarded as one of the great liars in Kufa.

Major uncertainty in veracity surrounds the reports narrated by Abi Saleh attributed to Ibn Abbas, as al-Kalbi stated towards the end of his life that everything narrated on the authority of Ibn Abbas by Abi Saleh is a lie. Sufyan al-Thawri, narrates from al-Kalbi:

"What you narrated on the authority of Abi Saleh, on the authority of Ibn Abbas, is a lie, so do not acknowledge it."

Furthermore, noted by Ibn Hibban, Abi Saleh never met Ibn Abbas; therefore, all narrations by Abi Saleh on the authority of Ibn Abbas are classified as disconnected and, consequently, weak (da'if)

"Ibn Hibban said: The obviousness of the lie in it is more apparent than the need to go into detail in describing it. He narrated on the authority of Abi Saleh, and Abi Saleh did not hear from Ibn Abbas, so it is not permissible to use it as evidence"

Similar narrations face the same challenges with transmission reliability. Despite Muhammad Ibn ‘Umar al-Waqidi being praised and acknowledged for his extensive knowledge of the maghazi, he is widely deemed weak (da'if) by the hadith scholars and all authors of the Kutub al-Sittah. an-Nasa'i reports his reliability.

"The liars known for fabricating the Hadith of the Messenger of Allah are four. They are: Arba’ah b. Abi Yahya in Madinah, al-Waqidi in Baghdad, Muqatil b. Sulayman in Khurasan and Muhammad bin Sa’id al-Kalbi in Syria."

Both Ahmad ibn Hanbal and al-Shafi'i also regarded al-Waqidi as a liar and fabricator. The credibility of al-Waqidi's narrations were rejected because it was not possible to find which parts of his reports were narrated by which reporter. His isnads were often interrupted (munqaṭiʻ).

Analysing al-Sarh’s later life introduces further doubt regarding whether he apostatised based on the reasons mentioned in al-Kalbi’s report, as it was narrated by al-Bagawi that al-Sarh passed away whilst in the prayer position.

=== Flight to Mecca ===
After leaving Islam, al-Sarh told the Meccans "دينكم خير من دينه" (i.e. "your religion is better than Muhammad's religion"). When Muhammad learned of this, it was soon thereafter revealed Quran 6:93; "And who is more unjust than one who invents a lie about Allah or says, "It has been inspired to me," while nothing has been inspired to him, and one who says, "I will reveal [something] like what Allah revealed."

Ibn Jarir al-Tabari recorded in his Tafsir of the Quran;

"Al-Qasim told us... "I can reveal like what Allah hath revealed" was revealed about Abdullah bin Sa'd bin Abi Al-Sarh, the brother of Bani (children of) Amir bin Lu'ai. He [Abdullah] used to write for the Prophet (SAW), and while he [Mohammad] was dictating "Exalted in power, full of Wisdom", he [Abdullah] would write it "Oft-Forgiving, Most Merciful", thus changing it. Then he [Abdullah] would read the changed verses to him [Mohammad], and he [Mohammad] would say, "Yes [in approval], it's like this". So, he [Abdullah] reverted from Islam and followed Quraysh telling them, "He [Mohammad] used to recite to me Exalted in power, full of Wisdom', and I would change it when I write it down, and he would tell me, 'Yes [in approval], it's the same [meaning]."

When Muhammad had gathered enough troops to besiege Mecca, he issued an order to his followers that Abdallah al-Surh was to be killed. Al-Sarh fled to his adopted brother Uthman ibn Affan to plead for help, knowing Uthman to be an important ally for Muhammad. Sunan Abu Dawud, Hadith 2683 records that:

"on the day when Mecca was conquered, the Messenger of Allah gave protection to the People except four men and two women and he named them. Ibn AbuSarh was one of them. He then narrated the tradition. He said: Ibn AbuSarh hid himself with Uthman ibn Affan. When the Messenger of Allah called the people to take the oath of allegiance, he brought him and made him stand before the Messenger of Allah. He said: Messenger of Allah, receive the oath of allegiance from him. He raised his head and looked at him thrice, denying him every time. After the third time he received his oath."

After Uthman and al-Surh had left, Muhammad turned to his Companions and said:

"Is not there any intelligent man among you who would stand to this (man) when he saw me desisting from receiving the oath of allegiance, and kill him?" and that "I kept silent so that one of you might get up and strike off his head!". They replied: We do not know, Messenger of Allah, what lies in your heart; did you not give us a hint with your eye? He said: It is not proper for a Prophet to have a treacherous eye.

Regardless, Al-Sarh's life was thus spared with the aid of Uthman's intervention, and he came back into the fold of Islam. In his History, al-Tabari briefly records about Abd Allah and Muhammad that "Abd Allah b. Sa`d b. Abi Sarh used to write for him. He apostatised from Islam and later returned to Islam on the day of the conquest of Mecca".

== During Umar's era ==
Umar appointed him as second-in-command (lieutenant) to Amr ibn al-As for the campaign of conquest of Egypt. He played a major role as a military commander in the conquest of Egypt. He was commander of the right flank of Amr's army and participated in all the battles fought during the conquest of Egypt under Amr's command.

== During Uthman's era ==
When Uthman became caliph in 644 CE, he appointed Abd Allah governor of Egypt replacing 'Amr ibn al-'As, with Muhammad ibn Abi Hudhayfa as his aide. Abd Allah brought over a large foreign entourage and established the diwan, "and commanded that all the taxes of the country should be regulated there".

The protests against Abd Allah appear to have been instigated by his aide, Muhammad ibn Abi Hudhayfa. Muhammad's father (Abi Hudhayfa) was an early convert to Islam who died in the Battle of Yamama. Muhammad was raised by Uthman. When he reached maturity he participated in the foreign military campaigns and accompanied Abd Allah to Egypt as an aide. Muhammad ibn Abi Hudhayfa admonished Abd Allah, recommending changes in the government but Abd Allah did not respond. After continuous efforts to persuade Abd Allah to make changes in the government, eventually Muhammad ibn Abi Hudhayfa lost patience and turned from sympathetic admonisher to a disillusioned opponent; first of Abd Allah and later of Uthman for appointing him. Abd Allah wrote to Uthman claiming that Muhammad was spreading sedition and that if nothing was done to stop him, the situation would escalate. Uthman attempted to silence Muhammad's protests with 30,000 dirhams and expensive presents. Uthman's gifts were perceived as a bribe and backfired with Muhammad bringing the money and presents into the Great Mosque saying;

"Do you see what Uthman is trying to do? He is trying to buy my faith. He has sent these coins and these goods to me as a bribe."

Uthman sent numerous placatory letters to Muhammad, but he continued building community opposition against Abd Allah. In 656 Egyptian community leaders decided to send a delegation to Medina to demand Abd Allah's dismissal. Abd Allah also left for Medina to defend himself at the court of the caliph. In his absence, Muhammad ibn Abi Hudhayfa assumed charge of the government.

When Abd Allah reached Ayla, he was told that Uthman's house was under siege (Siege of Uthman) and decided to return to Egypt. At the border he was informed that Muhammad ibn Abi Hudhayfa had given orders to prevent him from entering Egypt. He then went to Bilād al-Shām (the territory of the Eastern Mediterranean) awaiting the outcome of events in Medina. In the meantime, Uthman was assassinated in Medina, and when Abd Allah heard the news, he left Bilād al-Shām, and went to Damascus (in Jund Dimashq, and the capital at that time) to live under the protection of Muawiyah I.

== See also ==
- List of rulers of Egypt

Preceded by Amr ibn al-As	Governor of Egypt; 646–656	Succeeded by Muhammad ibn Abi Hudhayfa
