= Shurahbil ibn Amr =

7th-century Ghassanid governor

Shurahbil ibn Amr (Arabic: شرحبيل بن عمرو الغساني) was a Ghassanid governor of the vassal Ghassanid confederation under the Byzantine Empire in southern Syria region during the 7th century.

When Muhammad wished to spread the message of Islam, one of his letters was addressed to Shurahbil bin Amr. It was carried by an envoy, Harith bin Umayr, who was killed in A.D. 629 at a place called Tafilah, a village within the Roman province of Palaestina Salutaris, In the Mu'tah region in the western part of modern day Jordan. In response, an army of 3000 was forthwith mustered at the command of Zaid bin Harith to avenge the death of the envoy. This led to the Battle of Mu'tah, a small skirmish in which the Muslim forces were defeated and forced to withdraw due to the far superior numbers of the Byzantine Roman forces.
