= Chalabioghlou mausoleum =

Mausoleum in Soltaniyeh, Iran

Mausoleum of Chalabi Oghlu آرامگاه چلبی اوغلی
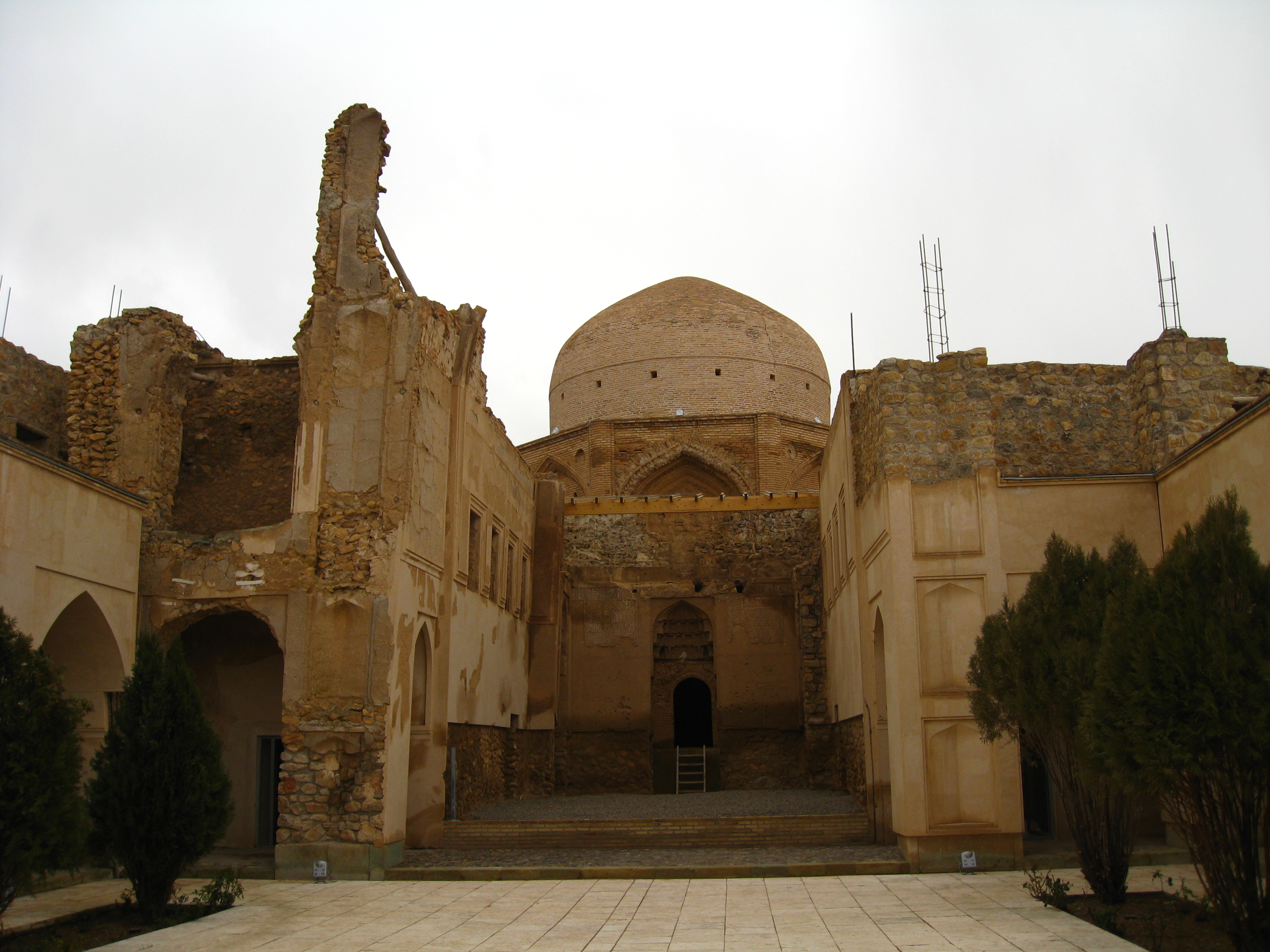

- Location within Iran
- Alternative names: Sheikh Barragh Mausoleum

General information
- Status: Cultural
- Type: mausoleum
- Architectural style: Azeri
- Location: Soltaniyeh, Iran
- Coordinates: 36.4341°N 48.7958°E

Height
- Height: 16 m (52 ft)

Iran National Heritage List
- Official name: Mausoleum of Chalabi Oghlu
- Type: Mausoleum
- Designated: 1932
- Reference no.: 167
- Conservation organization: Cultural Heritage, Handicrafts and Tourism Organization of Iran

The Chalabioghlou mausoleum, also known as Sheikh Barragh mausoleum, is a historical octagonal mausoleum in the city of Soltaniyeh, in the Zanjan Province, in Iran.

The mausoleum is located 500 m to the southwest of Dome of Soltaniyeh. The Chalabioghlou mausoleum was built between 1259 and 1284 in the ilkhanid era. According to the inscriptions, the mausoleum is the burial place of Sheikh Barragh Baba, who was a mystic in the ilkhanid era. This structure is a tomb tower from the middle Islamic age and from this point of view it is comparable with Emamzadeh Jafar in Isfahan.
