= Abd Allah ibn Rawahah =

Companion of Muhammad

Abd Allah ibn Rawaha عَبْد ٱللَّٰه ٱبْن رَوَاحَة
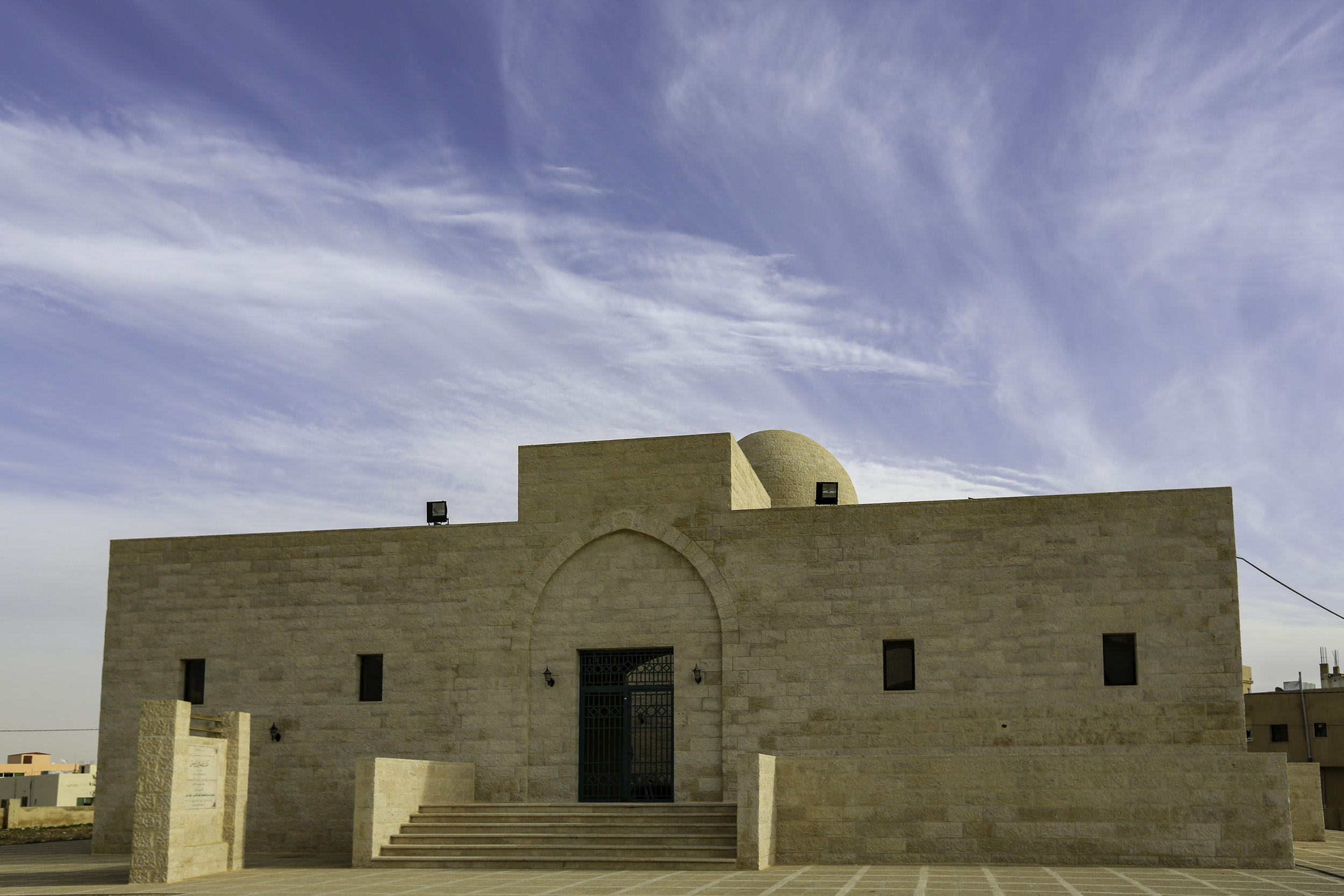
- The tomb of Abd Allah ibn Rawaha in Jordan.
- Born: Medina
- Died: 629 CE; Mu'tah, Eastern Roman Empire
- Cause of death: Martyrdom in the Battle of Mu'tah
- Resting place: Mausoleum of Abdullah ibn Rawahah in Al-Mazar, Karak Governorate, Jordan
- Known for: being a companion of Muhammad
- Parent: Rawaha ibn Tha'labah (father)
- Relatives: Amra bint Rawahah (sister); Nu'man ibn Bashir al-Ansari (nephew); Bashir ibn Sa'ad (brother-in-law)

Abd Allah ibn Rawahah ibn Tha'laba (Arabic: عَبْد ٱللَّٰه ٱبْن رَوَاحَة ٱبْن ثَعْلَبَة, romanized: ʿAbd Allāh ibn Rawāḥa ibn Thaʿlaba), was one of the companions of the Islamic prophet Muhammad who was killed in the Battle of Mu'tah.

== Biography ==
Ibn Rawaha was from the Arabian tribe of Banu Khazraj. At a time when writing was not a common skill, he was a scribe and a poet. Abdullah converted to Islam after hearing the Koran reading from Mus'ab ibn Umayr.

He was one of the twelve representatives of the Ansar who took an oath of allegiance before the Hijrah, and later spread Islam to Medina. Also he was among the 73 that pledged allegiance to Muhammad in Medina. He is said to have been alert to the plots of Abd-Allah ibn Ubayy. And among the verses that are quite famous are:

"O Soul, if you had not been killed (on the battlefield), you would have died too."

=== Military expeditions and death ===
He led his own expedition known as the Expedition of Abdullah ibn Rawaha, where he was sent to assassinate Al-Yusayr ibn Rizam.

Abdullah ibn Rawaha was third in command during the Battle of Mut'ah and was subsequently killed during the battle. Muhammad at that time was in Medina with his friends, he reported about the death of three noble warlords. Muhammad said, "The war banner was held by Zayd ibn Haritha, he fought while carrying the banner until he died as a martyr. Then the banner was taken over by Ja'far ibn Abi Talib, and he also fought to defend the banner until he died as a martyr too." He was silent for a moment, then continued his words, "Then Abdullah bin Rawahah took the war banner and he fought carrying that banner, until finally he died as a martyr too." Then Muhammad was silent for a moment, while his eyes radiated the light of joy, and said, "The three of them were raised to my place, to Heaven."

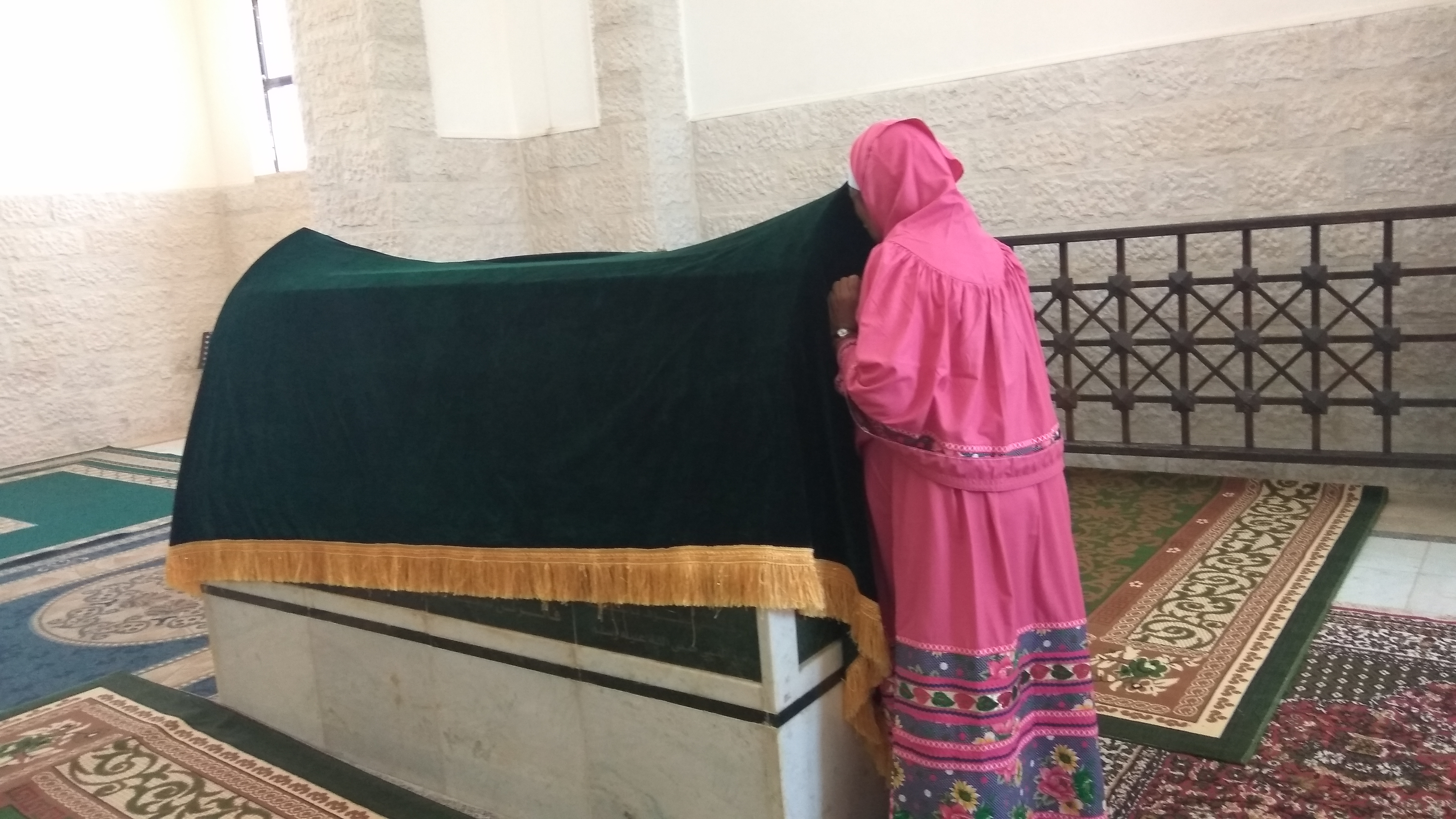
Tomb of Abdullah ib n Rawahah, near Mut'ah in Jordan

Abdullah bin Rawahah was killed by a spear thrust by the enemy troops, with blood flowing, he advanced to attack the enemy troops until his last breath in 629 AD. The leadership of the troops was then taken over by Khalid ibn al-Walid who then saved the entire army from retreating back to Medina.

== See also ==
- Sunni view of the Sahaba
- Hassan ibn Thabit
