= Muta (surname) =

Muta is a surname. Notable people with the surname include:

- Barbara Muta (born 1982), Papua New Guinean footballer
- Cyril Muta (born 1987), Papua New Guinean footballer
- David Muta (born 1987), Papua New Guinean footballer
- Yusuke Muta (牟田 雄祐, born 1990), Japanese footballer
