= Expedition of Abdullah ibn Rawaha =

Date	February 628 AD
Location	The Route to Medina
Result	Al-Yusayr ibn Rizam successfully assassinated and 29 followers killed

Commanders and leaders
Abdullah ibn Rawaha	Unknown (possibly Al-Yusayr ibn Rizam)

Strength
30	30

Casualties and losses
1 wounded	29 killed (1 escaped)

Expedition of Abdullah ibn Rawaha to Khyber, took place in February 628 AD. Ibn Hisham also refers to this as Abdullah b. Rawaha's raid to kill al-Yusayr b. Rizam.

The assassination was successful, and ibn Rizam was killed as well as 29 of his followers.

== Assassination of Al-Yusayr ibn Rizam ==
The assassination of Abu Rafi did not relieve Muhammad of his apprehensions. Muhammad did not feel safe from the Jews of Khyber.

Al-Yusayr ibn Rizam was elected the new chief of the Khyber Jews. He maintained the same good relations with the Banu Ghatafan that his predecessor Abu Rafi had. Muhammad heard that Al-Yusayr ibn Rizam was planning a fresh attack against him. So he deputed Abdallah ibn Rawaha, a leader of the Banu Khazraj, and sent him with three followers to Khyber to gather intelligence on how Al-Yusayr may be taken unaware and assassinated.

But Abdullah ibn Rawaha found the Jews to be extremely alert for this second assassination to be a success. When he returned to Medina a new strategy was devised, Muhammad again sent him openly with 30 men mounted on camels to persuade al-Yusayr to visit Medina. When they arrived, they assured Yusayr they will make him the ruler of Khyber and would treat him well, giving al-Yusayr ibn Rizam a solemn guarantee of his safety.

So he was mounted on the horse of Abdullah ibn Unais and the Muslims rode behind him. When they arrived at al-Qarqarat, about six miles from Khyber, al-Yusayr suspected the plans of the Muslims and changed his mind about going to meet Muhammad. He dismounted from the beast he was riding with Abdullah ibn Unais. Abdullah ibn Unais perceived that al-Yusayr was drawing his sword. So he rushed at him and hit him with a deadly blow on his hip joint. Al-Yusayr fell wounded on the floor but hit Abdullah ibn Unais and wounded him with a camel staff, the only weapon within his reach.

This was a signal for the Muslims to attack, each of the Muslims killed the Jews on the camels in front of them, one behind the other. The Muslims killed all the Jews, except one who escaped.

== Islamic primary sources ==
The Sunni hadith collection Sunan al-Tirmidhi no. 3923 mentions that Muhammad sent a detachment under Abdullah ibn Rawaha:

The Prophet (peace be upon him) sent Abdullah ibn Rawahah with a detachment and that happened to be on a Friday. His companions set off in the morning, but he decided to stay behind and catch up with them after saying the prayer along with Allah's Messenger (peace be upon him). When he did so he saw him and asked him what had prevented him from going out in the morning with his companions. He replied, "I wanted to pray along with you and then catch up with them." Whereupon he said, "If you were to contribute all that the earth contains you would not attain the excellence of their going out in the morning."

Tirmidhi transmitted it

[Tirmidhi no. 3923]

Musnad Ahmad ibn Hanbal

2:1966 also mentioned this incident.

== See also ==
- Military career of Muhammad
- List of expeditions of Muhammad
