= Mutah University =

Jordanian public university

Mu'tah University جامعة مؤته
- Motto: Vision of Education
- Type: Public & military
- Established: 22 March 1981
- President: Salameh Al Naimat
- Faculty: 550
- Administrative staff: 2,500
- Students: 17,000
- Location: Mu'tah, Karak Governorate, Jordan
- Website: https://www.mutah.edu.jo/

Mu’tah University (Arabic: جامعة مؤتة, Jāmi‘atu Mu'tah) is a public university in the Jordanian town of Mu'tah which was founded on 22 March 1981 by the Royal Decree to be a national institution for military and civilian higher education.

== Academics ==
In addition to the military college, Mu'tah University is divided into the following 15 main faculties:

- Faculty of Agriculture
- Faculty of Arts
- Faculty of Business Administration
- Faculty of Educational Sciences
- Faculty of Engineering
- Faculty of Humanities & Social Sciences
- Faculty of Law
- Faculty of Medicine
- Faculty of Allied Medical Sciences
- Faculty of Nursing
- Faculty of Science
- Faculty of Information Technology
- Faculty of Shari'a (Islamic Studies)
- Faculty of Sport Sciences
- Faculty of Pharmaceutical Sciences
- Faculty of Graduate Studies

== Faculty of Medicine ==
The Faculty of Medicine of Mu'tah University was founded in 2001; in accordance with the vision of King Abdullah II of the need of the kingdom to have more doctors and to have a medical school in the southern part of the country. The number of students enrolled at this medical school has increased over the last years; the number admitted in the academic year 2001/2002 was 27 students while in the academic year 2009/2010, the number was 185. The faculty awards its graduates a bachelor's degree in Medicine and Surgery M.B.B.S after completing a minimum of 262 credit hours. These include 31 credit hours of university requirements, 10 credit hours of basic scientific requirements, 86 credit hours of basic medical science requirements, and 135 credit hours of medical science requirements.

The faculty also offers research programmes and postgraduate medical education.

The graduation with the bachelor's degree in medicine and surgery demands the regularly attending student to complete all the requirements of the teaching plan as mentioned before; the cumulative average should not be less than 60%. This plan is applied for a minimum period of six academic years, extending to 8 years as a maximum.

== Postgraduate programs ==
In the field of postgraduate studies, the University established a Ph.D. program in Arabic language and literature in addition to various master programs in Sciences, literature and Languages, Economics and Management, Geography, Electrical Engineering (Communications), Education, Law and Police Studies.

== Journals ==
Mu'tah University issues three journals:

- Humanities and Social Sciences Series (Arabic: مجلة مؤتة للبحوث والدراسات / سِلسلة العلوم الإنسانية والاجتماعية) The journal publishes original scientific works in natural and applied sciences, it is published by the Deanship of Academic Research and is an indexed and refereed journal. A volume is published annually, ISSN 1021-6804.
- Natural and Applied Sciences Series (Arabic: مجلة مؤتة للبحوث والدراسات /سلسلة العلوم الطبيعية والتطبيقية) An annual journal that publishes original works in humanities and social sciences, published by Dar Mu’tah University Press. ISSN 1021-6812.
- Jordan Journal of Arabic Language and Literature (Arabic: المجلة الأردنية في اللغة العربية وآدابها) An international journal published in Arabic by the Ministry of Higher Education and Scientific Research in cooperation with Mu'tah University. Articles in languages other than Arabic are occasionally accepted for publication.

== See also ==
- List of Islamic educational institutions
