= Imamzadeh Ja'far, Isfahan =

Islam tomb in Isfahan, Iran

Imamzadeh Ja'far
- امامزاده جعفر
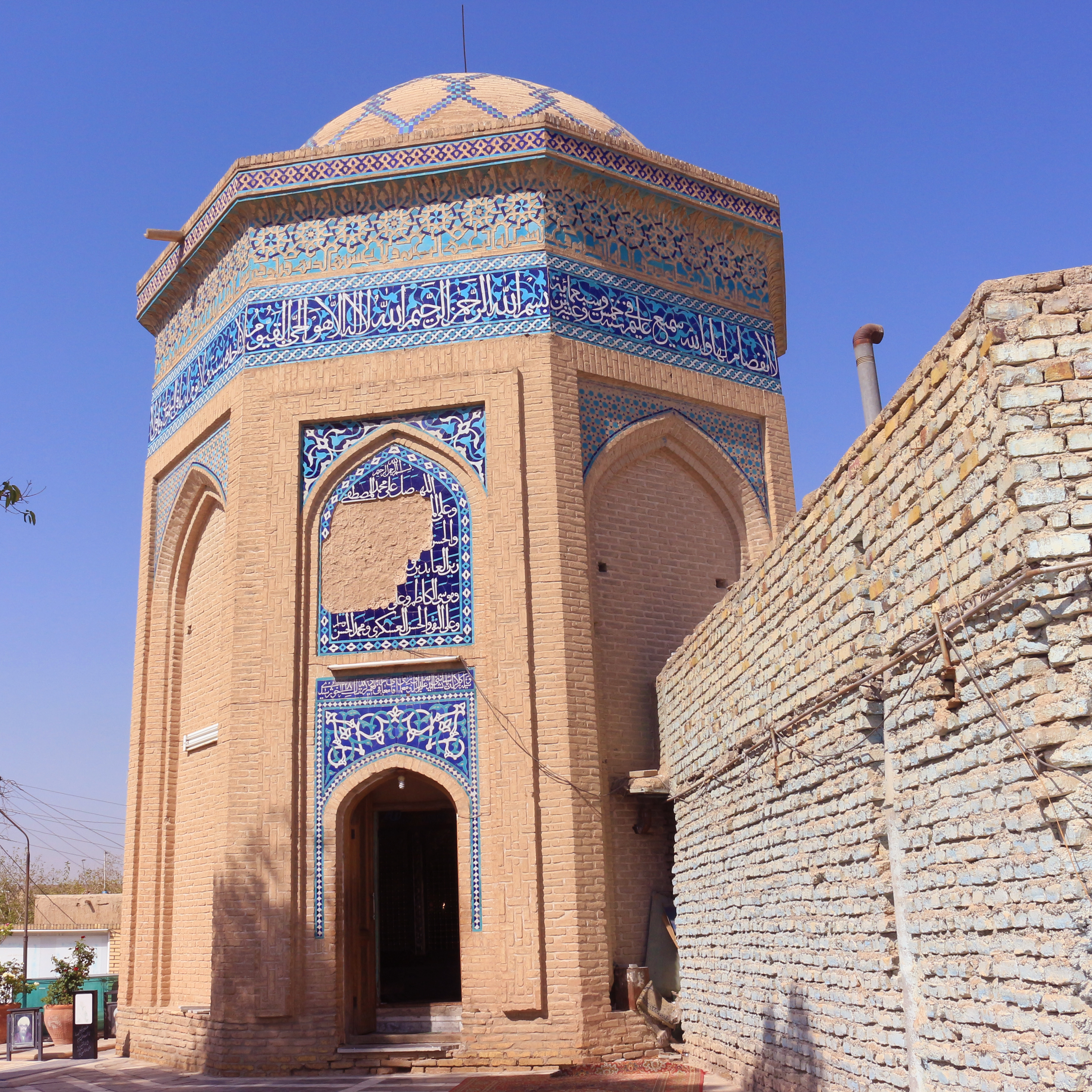

- Location in Iran

Religion
- Affiliation: Shia Islam
- Ecclesiastical or organisational status: Imamzadeh
- Status: Active

Location
- Location: Esfahan, Isfahan Province
- Country: Iran
- Interactive map of Imamzadeh Ja'far
- Coordinates: 32°39′48″N 51°41′04″E

Architecture
- Type: Islamic architecture
- Dome: One
- Designated as NHL

Iran National Heritage List
- Official name: Emamzadeh Jafar
- Type: Mausoleum
- Designated: 1933
- Reference no.: 198
- Conservation organization: Cultural Heritage, Handicrafts and Tourism Organization of Iran

Imamzadeh Ja'far (Persian: امامزاده جعفر) is a Shia imamzadeh in Isfahan, Iran. It is located opposite the Esmaeil religious complex. It is one of the pre-eminent structures of the Ilkhanid era. It is related that this emamzadeh is the grave of Ja'far ibn Abī Tālib, a companion of Mohammad. This structure was located formerly in the middle of a large yard, but it is now surrounded by residential buildings. The mausoleum is hexagonal and short and it seems that it had had a pyramid dome before, but its dome was destroyed and another dome like the dome of Chalabioghlou mausoleum in Soltaniyeh was built for it. This Emamzadeh is partly decorated by tiles. The shrine a holy site in Shia Islam.
