= Al-Mazar al-Janubi =

Governorate of Jordan

Al-Mazār al-Janūbī
- District
- Location within Jordan
- Coordinates: 31.00813°N 35.75605°E
- Country: Jordan
- Governorate: Karak

Area
  - Total: 493.0 km^{2} (190.3 sq mi)

Population (2015 census)
  - Total: 95,124
  - Density: 192.9/km^{2} (499.7/sq mi)
- Time zone: GMT +2
  - Summer (DST): +3

Al-Mazār al-Janūbī (Arabic: المزار الجنوبي) is one of the districts of Karak governorate, Jordan.
