= Mu'tah =

City of Mu'tah مَدِينَة مُؤْتَة
- City
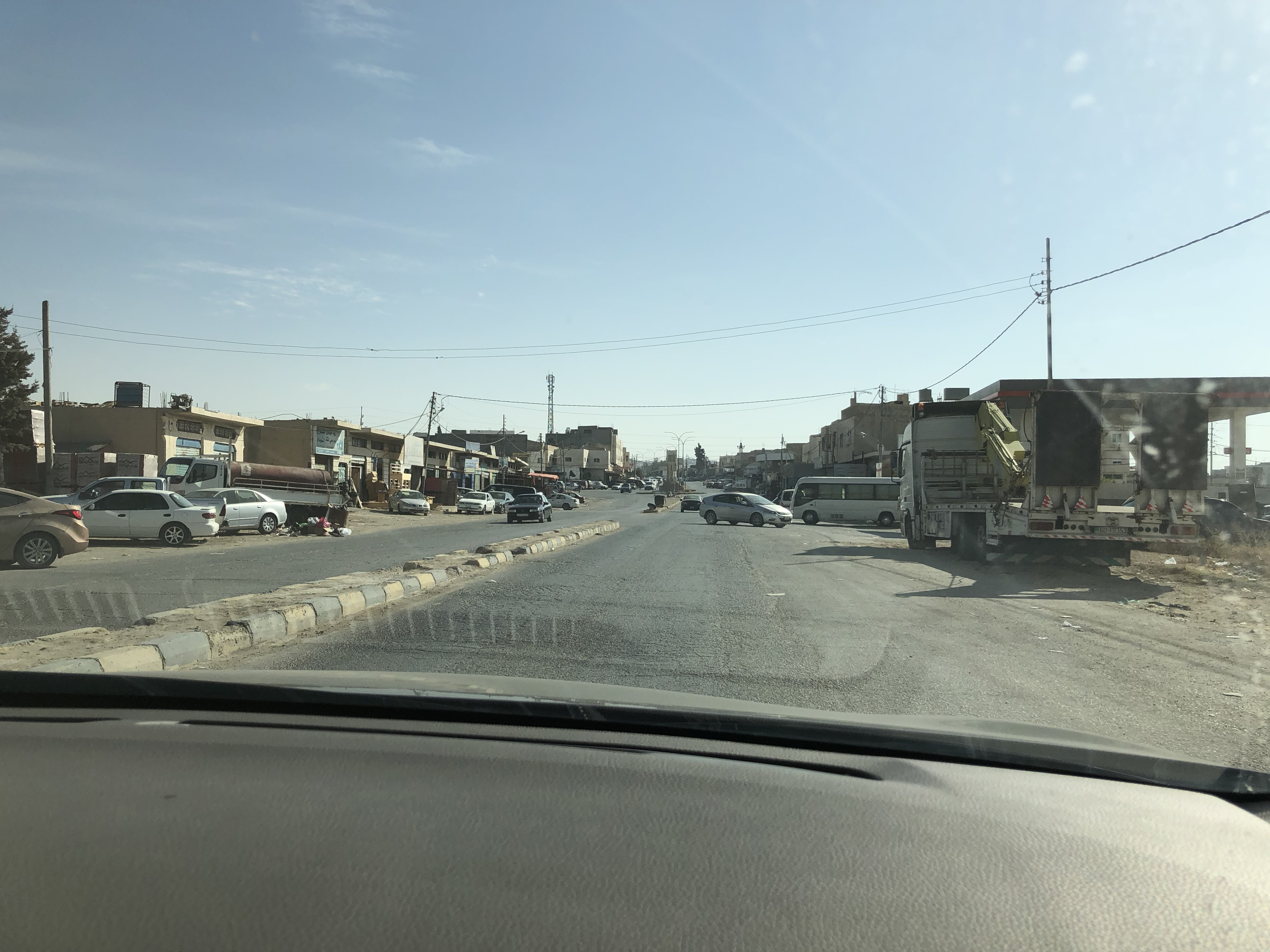

- Location within Jordan
- Coordinates: 31°6′N 35°42′E
- Grid position: 216/055
- Country: Jordan
- Province: Karak Governorate
- Elevation: 820 m (2,690 ft)

Population (2015)
  - Total: 27,426
- Time zone: GMT +2
  - Summer (DST): +3
- Area code: +(962)2

Mu'tah (Arabic: مُؤْتَة, Muʿtah) is a town in Karak Governorate in Jordan. Mutah University is located in the city.

== Geography ==
Mu'tah is located roughly 8 kilometers south of Al-Karak, on the route toward Tafilah.

== History ==
In Islamic tradition, it is known for the Battle of Mu'tah in 629 CE, the first military engagement between the Arab Muslims under Muhammad and the Byzantine Empire. Mausolea were built nearby for some of those fallen in said battle, namely Ja'far ibn Abi Talib, 'Abd Allah ibn Rawahah, and Zayd ibn Harithah. An Ayyubid/Mamluk mosque still stands in the town.

In 1596 it appeared in the Ottoman tax registers named as Muta, situated in the nahiya (subdistrict) of Karak, part of the Sanjak of Ajlun. It had 14 households; all Muslim. The villagers paid a fixed tax-rate of 25% on agricultural products; including wheat, barley, summer crops, olive trees/vineyards/fruit trees, goats and bee-hives; in addition to occasional revenues. The total tax was 6,000 akçe.

== See also ==
- Levant
- Sahaba

== Bibliography ==
- Hütteroth, W.-D.; Abdulfattah, K. (1977). Historical Geography of Palestine, Transjordan and Southern Syria in the Late 16th Century. Erlanger Geographische Arbeiten, Sonderband 5. Erlangen, Germany: Vorstand der Fränkischen Geographischen Gesellschaft. ISBN 3-920405-41-2.
- Le Strange, G. (1890). Palestine Under the Moslems: A Description of Syria and the Holy Land from A.D. 650 to 1500. Committee of the Palestine Exploration Fund.
- Miller, J. M. (1991). Archaeological Survey of the Kerak Plateau: Conducted during 1978–1982 under the Direction of J. Maxwell Miller and Jack M. Pinkerton. Atlanta, GA: Scholars Press.
