= 1950 United States Senate elections =

- November 7, 1950
- Class 3

36 of the 96 seats in the United States Senate (Note: 32 regular elections and 4 specials) 49 seats needed for a majority
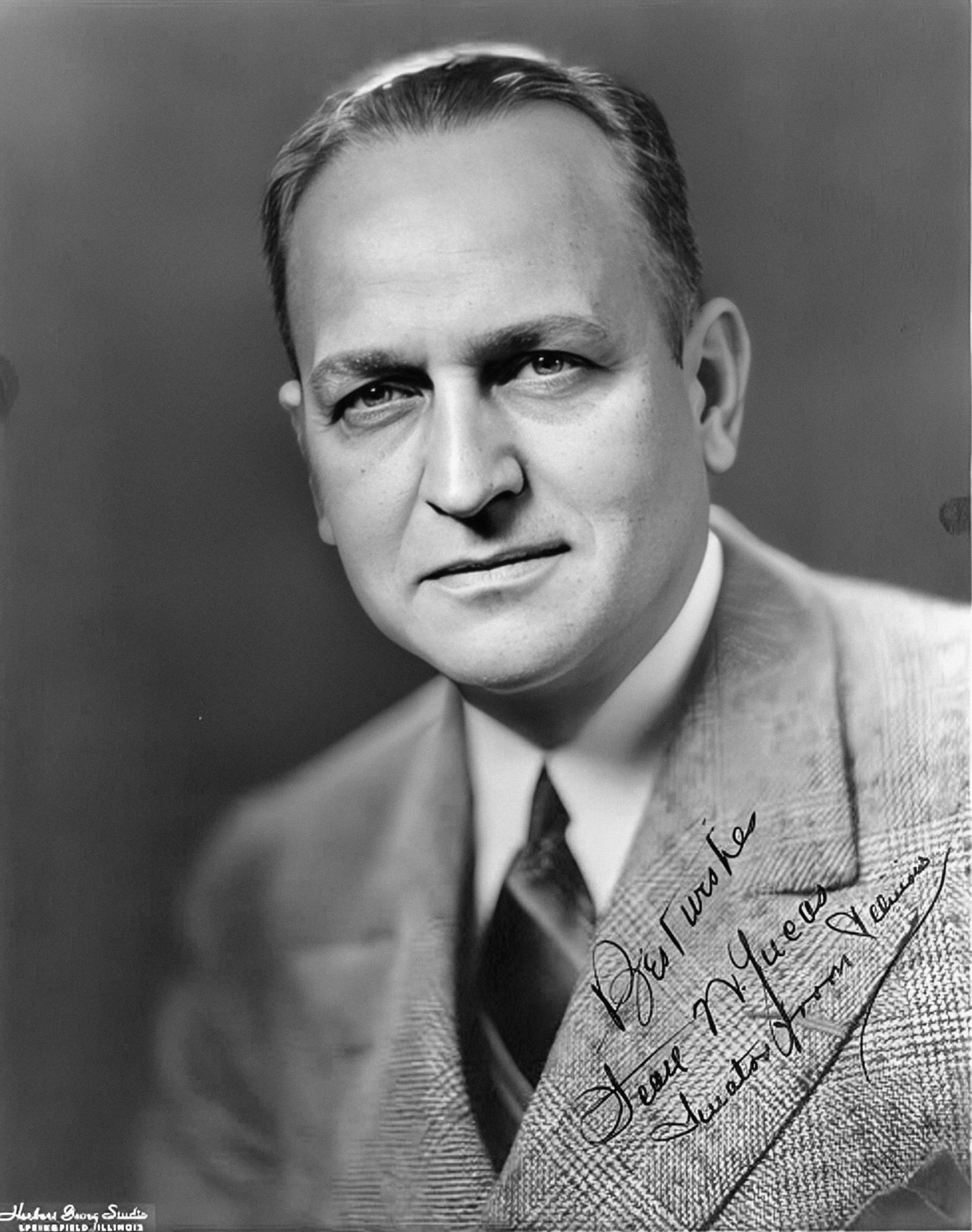

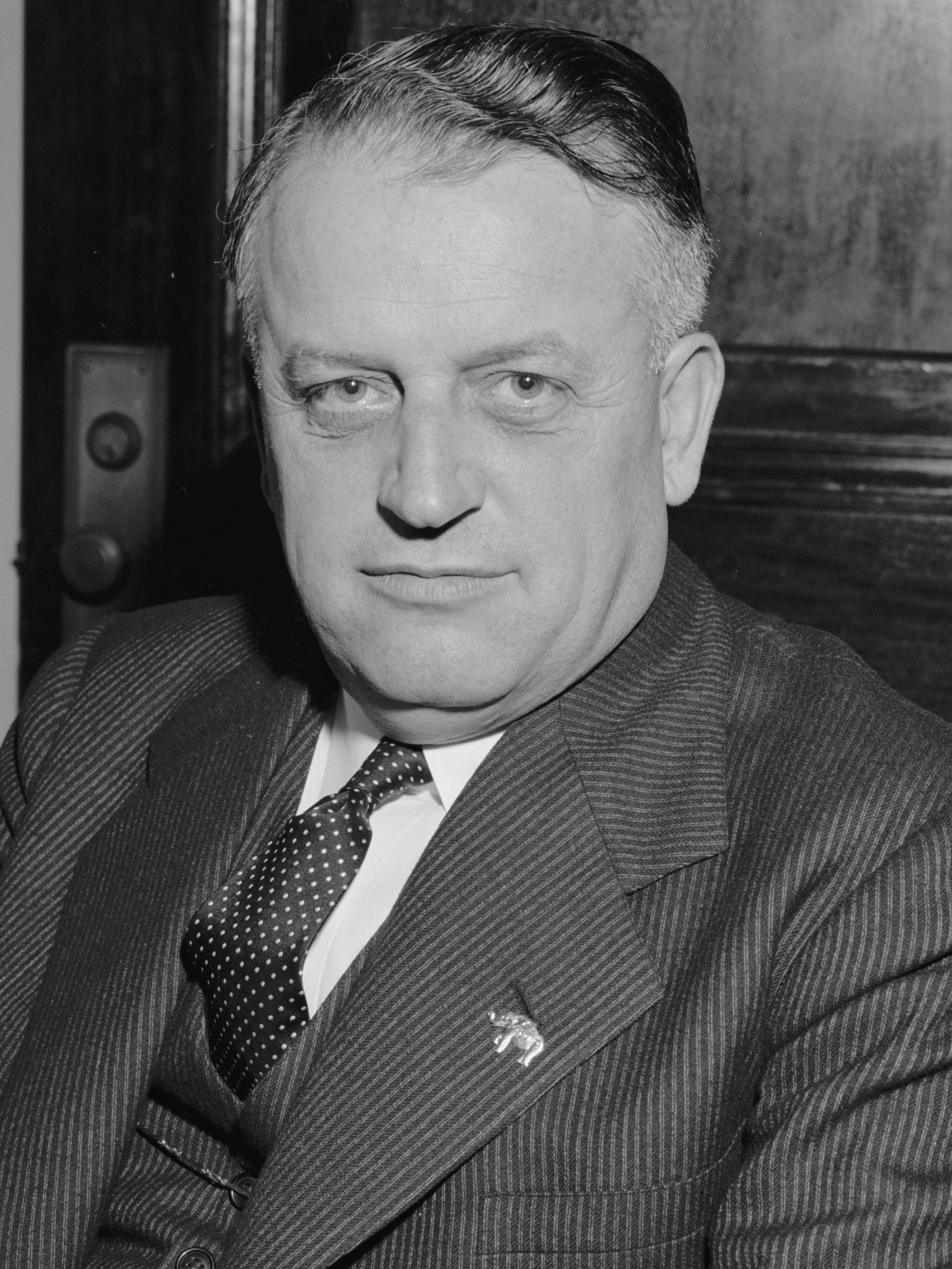
	Majority party	Minority party
Leader	Scott Lucas (lost re-election)	Ken Wherry
Party	Democratic	Republican
Leader since	January 3, 1949	January 3, 1949
Leader's seat	Illinois	Nebraska
Seats before	54	42
Seats after	49	47
Seat change	▼5	▲5
Popular vote	16,374,996	17,023,295
Percentage	47.7%	49.6%
Seats up	23	13
Races won	18	18
- Results of the elections: Democratic gain Democratic hold Republican gain Republican hold No election Rectangular inset (Conn., Id. & N. C.): both seats up for election
Majority Leader before election
Scott Lucas
Democratic
Elected Majority Leader
Ernest McFarland
Democratic

The 1950 United States Senate elections occurred in the middle of Harry S. Truman's second term as president. The 32 seats of Class 3 were contested in regular elections, and four special elections were held to fill vacancies. As with most 20th-century second-term midterms, the party not holding the presidency made significant gains. The Republican opposition made a net gain of five seats, taking advantage of the Democratic administration's declining popularity during the Cold War and the aftermath of the Recession of 1949. The Democrats held a narrow 49-to-47-seat majority after the election. This was the first time since 1932 that the Senate majority leader lost his seat, and as of 2026 the only instance in the chamber's history where the majority leader lost his seat while his party simultaneously retained the majority.

== Results summary ==
↓
49	47
Democratic	Republican

Colored shading indicates party with largest share of that row.

Parties				Total
Parties	Democratic	Republican	Other	Total
Last elections (1948) Before these elections	54	42	0	96
Not up	31	29	—	60
Up	23	13	—	36
Class 3 (1944→1950)	20	12	—	32
Special: Class 1	2	0	—	2
Special: Class 2	1	1	—	2
Incumbent retired	3 (Note: In California, Sheridan Downey was originally renominated, but retired due to ill health.)	1	—	4
Held by same party	2	1	—	3
Replaced by other party	▼1 Democrat replaced by ▲1 Republican		—	1
Result	2	2	0	4
Incumbent ran	20	12	—	32
Won re-election	12	10	—	22
Lost re-election	▼1 Republican replaced by ▲1 Democrat ▼4 Democrats replaced by ▲4 Republicans		—	5
Lost renomination but held by same party	3	1	—	4
Lost renomination and party lost	▼1 Democrat replaced by ▲1 Republican		—	1
Result	16	16	0	32
Total elected	18	18	0	36
Net change	▼5	▲5	Steady	5
Nationwide vote	16,374,996	17,023,295	946,945	34,345,236
Share	47.68%	49.57%	2.76%	100%
Result	49	47	0	96

Source: Clerk of the U.S. House of Representatives

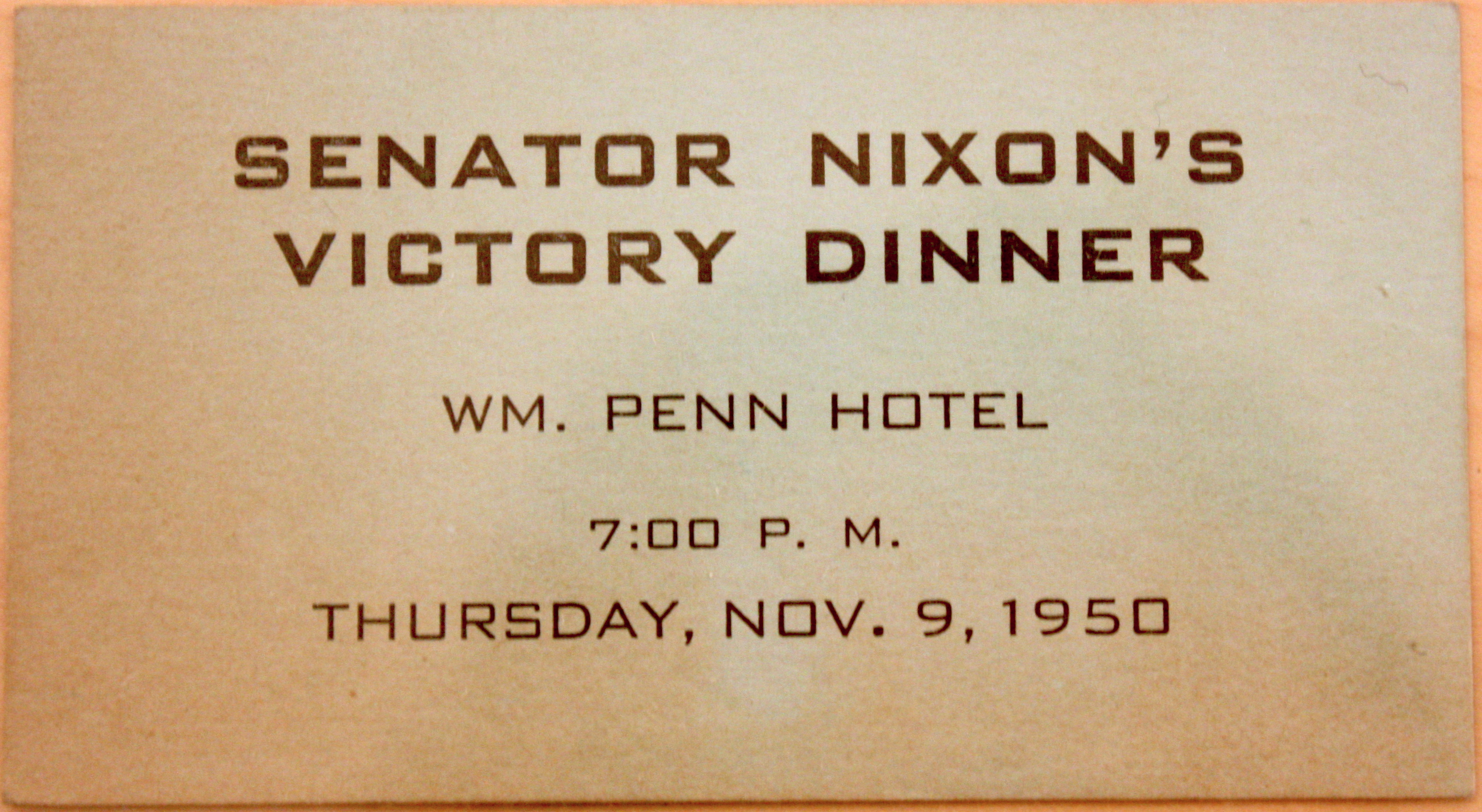
Ticket to a victory dinner for Richard Nixon at the Wm. Penn Hotel

== Gains, losses, and holds ==
=== Retirements ===
One Republican and three Democrats retired instead of seeking re-election.

State	Senator	Replaced by
California	Sheridan Downey	Richard Nixon
Kansas	Harry Darby	Frank Carlson
Kentucky	Garrett Withers	Earle Clements
Rhode Island	Edward L. Leahy	John Pastore

=== Defeats ===
Two Republicans and eight Democrats sought re-election but lost in the primary or general election.

State	Senator	Replaced by
Florida	Claude Pepper	George Smathers
Idaho	Glen H. Taylor	Herman Welker
Illinois	Scott Lucas	Everett Dirksen
Maryland	Millard Tydings	John Marshall Butler
Missouri	Forrest C. Donnell	Thomas C. Hennings Jr.
North Carolina (special)	Frank Porter Graham	Willis Smith
Oklahoma	Elmer Thomas	Mike Monroney
Pennsylvania	Francis J. Myers	James H. Duff
South Dakota	Chan Gurney	Francis Case
Utah	Elbert D. Thomas	Wallace F. Bennett

=== Post-election changes ===
State	Senator	Replaced by
Connecticut	Brien McMahon	William A. Purtell
Kentucky	Virgil Chapman	Thomas R. Underwood
Michigan	Arthur Vandenberg	Blair Moody
Nebraska	Kenneth S. Wherry	Fred A. Seaton

== Change in composition ==
=== Before the elections ===
		D_{1}	D_{2}	D_{3}	D_{4}	D_{5}	D_{6}	D_{7}	D_{8}
D_{18}	D_{17}	D_{16}	D_{15}	D_{14}	D_{13}	D_{12}	D_{11}	D_{10}	D_{9}
D_{19}	D_{20}	D_{21}	D_{22}	D_{23}	D_{24}	D_{25}	D_{26}	D_{27}	D_{28}
D_{38} Fla. Ran	D_{37} Conn. (sp); Ran	D_{36} Conn. (reg); Ran	D_{35} Calif. Retired	D_{34} Ark. Ran	D_{33} Ariz. Ran	D_{32} Ala. Ran	D_{31}	D_{30}	D_{29}
D_{39} Ga. Ran	D_{40} Ky. (reg); Ky. (sp); Resigned	D_{41} Idaho (reg); Ran	D_{42} Ill. Ran	D_{43} La. Ran	D_{44} Md. Ran	D_{45} Nev. Ran	D_{46} N.Y. Ran	D_{47} N.C. (reg); Ran	D_{48} N.C. (sp); Ran
Majority →									D_{49} Okla. Ran
R_{39} Ore. Ran	R_{40} S.D. Ran	R_{41} Vt. Ran	R_{42} Wisc. Ran	D_{54} Wash. Ran	D_{53} Utah; Ran	D_{52} S.C. Ran	D_{51} R.I. (sp); Retired	D_{50} Pa. Ran	D_{49} Okla. Ran
R_{38} Ohio; Ran	R_{37} N.D. Ran	R_{36} N.H. Ran	R_{35} Mo. Ran	R_{34} Kan. (reg); Kan. (sp); Retired	R_{33} Iowa; Ran	R_{32} Ind. Ran	R_{31} Idaho (sp); Ran	R_{30} Colo. Ran	R_{29}
R_{19}	R_{20}	R_{21}	R_{22}	R_{23}	R_{24}	R_{25}	R_{26}	R_{27}	R_{28}
R_{18}	R_{17}	R_{16}	R_{15}	R_{14}	R_{13}	R_{12}	R_{11}	R_{10}	R_{9}
		R_{1}	R_{2}	R_{3}	R_{4}	R_{5}	R_{6}	R_{7}	R_{8}

=== Results of the elections ===
		D_{1}	D_{2}	D_{3}	D_{4}	D_{5}	D_{6}	D_{7}	D_{8}
D_{18}	D_{17}	D_{16}	D_{15}	D_{14}	D_{13}	D_{12}	D_{11}	D_{10}	D_{9}
D_{19}	D_{20}	D_{21}	D_{22}	D_{23}	D_{24}	D_{25}	D_{26}	D_{27}	D_{28}
D_{38} Ga. Re-elected	D_{37} Fla. Hold	D_{36} Conn. (sp); Elected (Note: Appointee elected)	D_{35} Conn. (reg); Re-elected	D_{34} Ark. Re-elected	D_{33} Ariz. Re-elected	D_{32} Ala. Re-elected	D_{31}	D_{30}	D_{29}
D_{39} Ky. (reg); Ky. (sp); Hold	D_{40} La. Re-elected	D_{41} Nev. Re-elected	D_{42} N.Y. Re-elected	D_{43} N.C. (reg); Re-elected	D_{44} N.C. (sp); Hold	D_{45} Okla. Hold	D_{46} R.I. (sp); Hold	D_{47} S.C. Re-elected	D_{48} Wash. Re-elected
Majority →									D_{49} Mo. Gain
R_{39} S.D. Hold	R_{40} Vt. Re-elected	R_{41} Wisc. Re-elected	R_{42} Calif. Gain	R_{43} Idaho (reg); Gain	R_{44} Ill. Gain	R_{45} Md. Gain	R_{46} Pa. Gain	R_{47} Utah; Gain	D_{49} Mo. Gain
R_{38} Ore. Re-elected	R_{37} Ohio; Re-elected	R_{36} N.D. Re-elected	R_{35} N.H. Re-elected	R_{34} Kan. (reg); Kan. (sp); Hold	R_{33} Iowa; Re-elected	R_{32} Ind. Re-elected	R_{31} Idaho (sp); Elected	R_{30} Colo. Re-elected	R_{29}
R_{19}	R_{20}	R_{21}	R_{22}	R_{23}	R_{24}	R_{25}	R_{26}	R_{27}	R_{28}
R_{18}	R_{17}	R_{16}	R_{15}	R_{14}	R_{13}	R_{12}	R_{11}	R_{10}	R_{9}
		R_{1}	R_{2}	R_{3}	R_{4}	R_{5}	R_{6}	R_{7}	R_{8}

Key:	D_{#} / Democratic; R_{#} / Republican

== Race summaries ==
=== Special elections during the 81st Congress ===
In these special elections, the winners were seated during 1950 or before January 3, 1951; ordered by election date.

State (linked to summaries below)	Incumbent			Results (linked to election articles)	Candidates
State (linked to summaries below)	Senator	Party	Electoral history	Results (linked to election articles)	Candidates
Connecticut (Class 1)	William Benton	Democratic	1949 (Appointed)	Interim appointee elected November 7, 1950.	▌ ✓ William Benton (Democratic) 50.1%; ▌Prescott Bush (Republican) 49.9%
Idaho (Class 2)	Henry Dworshak	Republican	1946 (special); 1948 (Lost); 1949 (Appointed)	Interim appointee elected November 7, 1950.	▌ ✓ Henry Dworshak (Republican) 51.9%; ▌Claude J. Burtenshaw (Democratic) 48.1%
Kansas (Class 3)	Harry Darby	Republican	1949 (Appointed)	Interim appointee retired November 28, 1950 when successor's election was certified. Successor elected November 7, 1950. Republican hold. Winner was also elected to finish the term; see below.	▌ ✓ Frank Carlson (Republican) 55.2%; ▌Paul Aiken (Democratic) 44.8%
Kentucky (Class 3)	Garrett Withers	Democratic	1949 (Appointed)	Interim appointee resigned to trigger special election. Successor elected November 7, 1950. Democratic hold. Winner was also elected to finish the term; see below.	▌ ✓ Earle Clements (Democratic) 54.4%; ▌Charles I. Dawson (Republican) 45.6%
North Carolina (Class 2)	Frank Porter Graham	Democratic	1949 (Appointed)	Interim appointee lost nomination to finish term. Winner elected November 7, 1950. Democratic hold.	▌ ✓ Willis Smith (Democratic) 67.0%; ▌E. L. Gavin (Republican) 32.6%
Rhode Island (Class 1)	Edward L. Leahy	Democratic	1949 (Appointed)	Interim appointee retired. Winner elected November 7, 1950. Democratic hold.	▌ ✓ John Pastore (Democratic) 61.6%; ▌Austin T. Levy (Republican) 38.4%

=== Races leading to the 82nd Congress ===
In these regular elections, the winner was seated on January 3, 1951; ordered by state.

All of the elections involved the Class 3 seats.

State (linked to summaries below)	Incumbent			Results (linked to election articles)	Candidates
State (linked to summaries below)	Senator	Party	Electoral history	Results (linked to election articles)	Candidates
Alabama	J. Lister Hill	Democratic	1938 (Appointed); 1938 (special); 1938; 1944	Incumbent re-elected.	▌ ✓ J. Lister Hill (Democratic) 76.5%; ▌John G. Crommelin (Independent) 23.5%
Arizona	Carl Hayden	Democratic	1926; 1932; 1938; 1944	Incumbent re-elected.	▌ ✓ Carl Hayden (Democratic) 62.8%; ▌Bruce Brockett (Republican) 37.2%
Arkansas	J. William Fulbright	Democratic	1944	Incumbent re-elected.	▌ ✓ J. William Fulbright (Democratic); Unopposed
California	Sheridan Downey	Democratic	1938; 1944	Incumbent renominated, but then retired due to ill health. New senator elected. Republican gain. Winner was appointed December 1, 1950 to finish the therm.	▌ ✓ Richard Nixon (Republican) 59.2%; ▌Helen Gahagan Douglas (Democratic) 40.8%
Colorado	Eugene Millikin	Republican	1941 (Appointed); 1942; 1944	Incumbent re-elected.	▌ ✓ Eugene Millikin (Republican) 53.3%; ▌John A. Carroll (Democratic) 46.8%
Connecticut	Brien McMahon	Democratic	1944	Incumbent re-elected.	▌ ✓ Brien McMahon (Democratic) 51.7%; ▌Joseph E. Talbot (Republican) 46.6%
Florida	Claude Pepper	Democratic	1936 (special); 1938; 1944	Incumbent lost renomination. New senator elected. Democratic hold.	▌ ✓ George Smathers (Democratic) 76.2%; ▌John P. Booth (Republican) 23.7%
Georgia	Walter F. George	Democratic	1922 (special); 1926; 1932; 1938; 1944	Incumbent re-elected.	▌ ✓ Walter F. George (Democratic); Unopposed
Idaho	Glen H. Taylor	Democratic	1944	Incumbent lost renomination. New senator elected. Republican gain.	▌ ✓ Herman Welker (Republican) 61.7%; ▌D. Worth Clark (Democratic) 38.3%
Illinois	Scott W. Lucas	Democratic	1938; 1944	Incumbent lost re-election. New senator elected. Republican gain.	▌ ✓ Everett Dirksen (Republican) 53.9%; ▌Scott W. Lucas (Democratic) 45.8%
Indiana	Homer E. Capehart	Republican	1944	Incumbent re-elected.	▌ ✓ Homer E. Capehart (Republican) 52.8%; ▌Alexander M. Campbell (Democratic) 46.4%
Iowa	Bourke B. Hickenlooper	Republican	1944	Incumbent re-elected.	▌ ✓ Bourke B. Hickenlooper (Republican) 54.8%; ▌Albert J. Loveland (Democratic) 44.7%
Kansas	Harry Darby	Republican	1949 (Appointed)	Incumbent retired. New senator elected. Republican hold. Winner was also elected to finish the current term; see above.	▌ ✓ Frank Carlson (Republican) 54.3%; ▌Paul Aiken (Democratic) 43.8%
Kentucky	Garrett Withers	Democratic	1949 (Appointed)	Incumbent retired. New senator elected. Democratic hold. Incumbent resigned to trigger special election and winner was also elected to finish the current term; see above.	▌ ✓ Earle Clements (Democratic) 54.2%; ▌Charles I. Dawson (Republican) 45.1%
Louisiana	Russell B. Long	Democratic	1948 (special)	Incumbent re-elected.	▌ ✓ Russell B. Long (Democratic) 87.7%; ▌Charles S. Gerth (Republican) 12.3%
Maryland	Millard Tydings	Democratic	1944	Incumbent lost re-election. New senator elected. Republican gain.	▌ ✓ John Marshall Butler (Republican) 53.0%; ▌Millard Tydings (Democratic) 46.0%
Missouri	Forrest C. Donnell	Republican	1944	Incumbent lost re-election. New senator elected. Democratic gain.	▌ ✓ Thomas C. Hennings Jr. (Democratic) 53.6%; ▌Forrest C. Donnell (Republican) 46.4%
Nevada	Pat McCarran	Democratic	1932; 1938; 1944	Incumbent re-elected.	▌ ✓ Pat McCarran (Democratic) 58.0%; ▌George E. Marshall (Republican) 42.0%
New Hampshire	Charles W. Tobey	Republican	1938; 1944	Incumbent re-elected.	▌ ✓ Charles W. Tobey (Republican) 55.7%; ▌Emmet J. Kelley (Democratic) 38.0%; ▌Wesley Powell (Independent) 6.3%
New York	Herbert H. Lehman	Democratic	1949 (special)	Incumbent re-elected.	▌ ✓ Herbert H. Lehman (Democratic) 50.3%; ▌Joe R. Hanley (Republican) 45.3%
North Carolina	Clyde R. Hoey	Democratic	1932; 1932 (special); 1938; 1944	Incumbent re-elected.	▌ ✓ Clyde R. Hoey (Democratic) 68.7%; ▌Halsey B. Leavitt (Republican) 31.3%
North Dakota	Milton Young	Republican	1945 (Appointed); 1946 (special)	Incumbent re-elected.	▌ ✓ Milton Young (Republican) 67.6%; ▌Harry O'Brien (Democratic) 32.4%
Ohio	Robert A. Taft	Republican	1938; 1944	Incumbent re-elected.	▌ ✓ Robert A. Taft (Republican) 57.5%; ▌Joseph T. Ferguson (Democratic) 42.5%
Oklahoma	Elmer Thomas	Democratic	1926; 1932; 1938; 1944	Incumbent lost renomination. New senator elected. Democratic hold.	▌ ✓ Mike Monroney (Democratic) 54.8%; ▌W. H. Bill Alexander (Republican) 45.2%
Oregon	Wayne Morse	Republican	1944	Incumbent re-elected.	▌ ✓ Wayne Morse (Republican) 74.8%; ▌Howard Latourette (Democratic) 23.2%
Pennsylvania	Francis J. Myers	Democratic	1944	Incumbent lost re-election. New senator elected. Republican gain.	▌ ✓ James H. Duff (Republican) 51.3%; ▌Francis J. Myers (Democratic) 47.7%
South Carolina	Olin D. Johnston	Democratic	1944	Incumbent re-elected.	▌ ✓ Olin D. Johnston (Democratic); Unopposed
South Dakota	Chan Gurney	Republican	1938; 1944	Incumbent lost renomination. New senator elected. Republican hold.	▌ ✓ Francis Case (Republican) 63.9%; ▌John A. Engel (Democratic) 36.1%
Utah	Elbert D. Thomas	Democratic	1932; 1938; 1944	Incumbent lost re-election. New senator elected. Republican gain.	▌ ✓ Wallace F. Bennett (Republican) 53.9%; ▌Elbert D. Thomas (Democratic) 45.8%
Vermont	George Aiken	Republican	1940 (special); 1944	Incumbent re-elected.	▌ ✓ George Aiken (Republican) 78.0%; ▌James E. Bigelow (Democratic) 22.0%
Washington	Warren Magnuson	Democratic	1944 (Appointed); 1944	Incumbent re-elected.	▌ ✓ Warren Magnuson (Democratic) 53.4%; ▌Walter Williams (Republican) 46.0%
Wisconsin	Alexander Wiley	Republican	1938; 1944	Incumbent re-elected.	▌ ✓ Alexander Wiley (Republican) 53.3%; ▌Thomas E. Fairchild (Democratic) 46.2%; ▌Edwin Knappe (Socialist) 0.4%

== Closest races ==
Fifteen races had a margin of victory under 10%:

State	Party of winner	Margin
Connecticut (special)	Democratic (Note: The incumbent Republican Senator, Raymond E. Baldwin, resigned mid-term and Democrat William Benton had been appointed.)	0.1%
Pennsylvania	Republican (flip)	3.6%
Idaho (special)	Republican	3.8%
New York	Democratic	5.0% (Note: New York was the "tipping point" state.)
Connecticut	Democratic	5.1%
Indiana	Republican	6.4%
Colorado	Republican	6.5%
Maryland	Republican (flip)	7.0%
Wisconsin	Republican	7.1%
Missouri	Democratic (flip)	7.2%
Washington	Democratic	7.4%
Utah	Republican (flip)	8.03%
Illinois	Republican (flip)	8.12%
Kentucky	Democratic	9.1%
Oklahoma	Democratic	9.2%

== Alabama ==
1950 United States Senate election in Alabama
- November 7, 1950
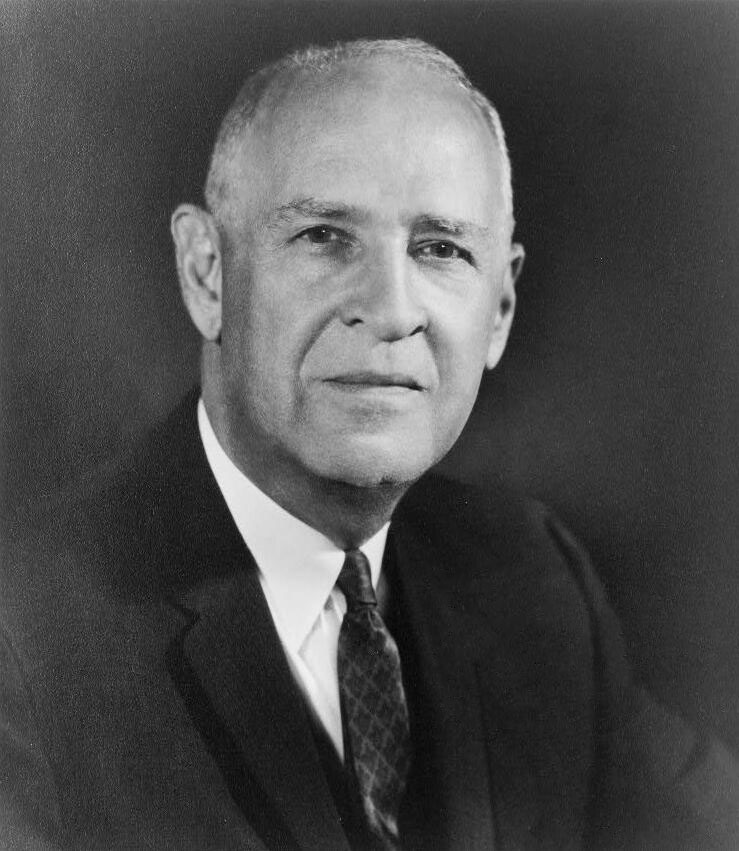

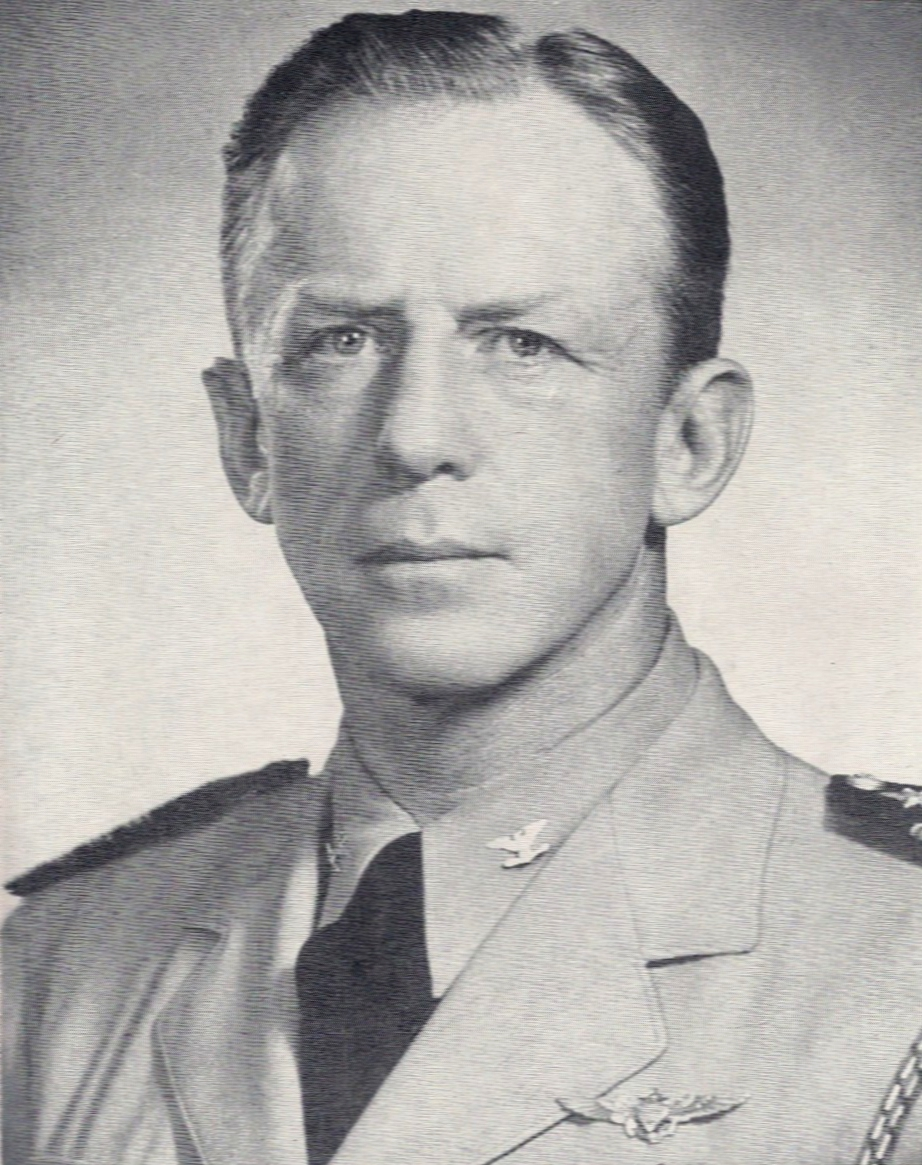
Nominee	Lister Hill	John G. Crommelin
Party	Democratic	Independent
Popular vote	125,534	38,477
Percentage	76.54%	23.46%
- County results Hill: 60–70% 70–80% 80–90% >90%
U.S. senator before election
J. Lister Hill
Democratic
Elected U.S. Senator
J. Lister Hill
Democratic

Alabama election
Party	Candidate	Votes	%	±%
Democratic	J. Lister Hill (incumbent)	125,534	76.54%	▼5.24
Independent	John G. Crommelin	38,477	23.46%	N/A
Total votes		164,011	100.00%	
Democratic hold		Swing		

== Arizona ==
1950 United States Senate election in Arizona
- November 7, 1950
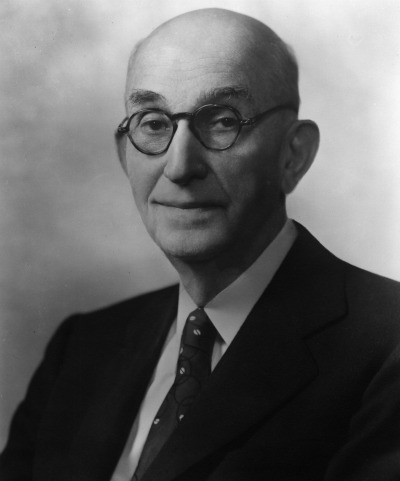

Nominee	Carl Hayden	Bruce Brockett
Party	Democratic	Republican
Popular vote	116,246	68,846
Percentage	62.80%	37.20%
- County results Hayden: 50–60% 60–70% 70–80% 80–90%
U.S. senator before election
Carl Hayden
Democratic
Elected U.S. Senator
Carl Hayden
Democratic

Incumbent Democratic U.S. senator Carl Hayden ran for re-election to a fifth term, defeating Republican nominee Bruce Brockett in the general election. Brockett was formerly the Republican nominee for governor in both 1946 and 1948. Hayden first defeated Cecil H. Miller and Robert E. Miller (of the Arizona Farm Bureau), for the Democratic nomination.

Democratic primary
Party	Candidate	Votes	%
Democratic	Carl Hayden (incumbent)	95,544	70.97%
Democratic	Cecil H. Miller	24,340	18.08%
Democratic	Robert E. Miller	14,752	10.96%
Total votes		134,636	100.00%

General election
Party	Candidate	Votes	%
Democratic	Carl Hayden (incumbent)	116,246	62.80%
Republican	Bruce Brockett	68,846	37.20%
Majority		47,400	25.60%
Turnout		185,092	
Democratic hold			

== Arkansas ==
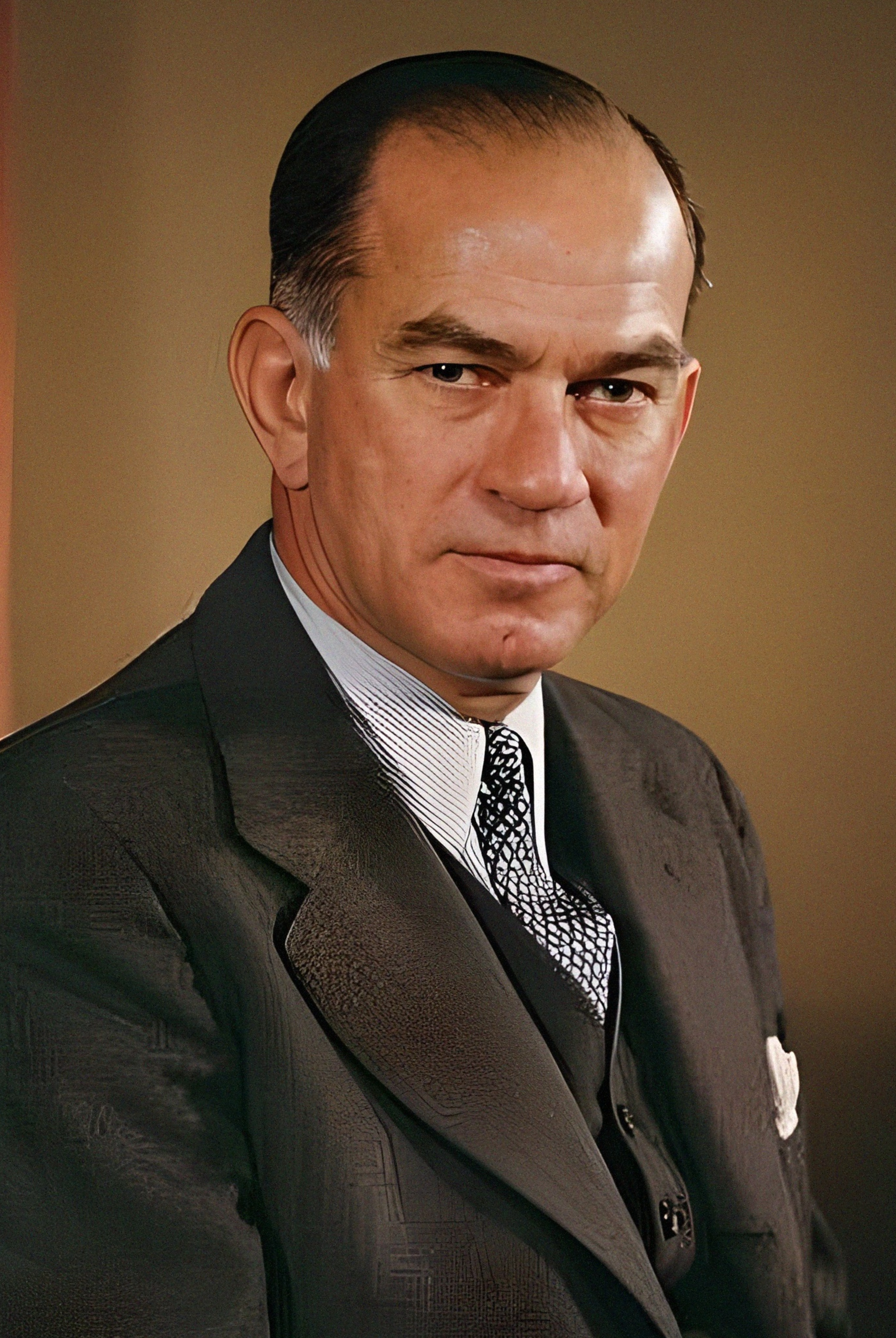
Senator J. William Fulbright

Arkansas election
Party	Candidate	Votes	%
Democratic	J. William Fulbright (incumbent)	302,686	100.00%
Democratic hold			

== California ==
1950 United States Senate election in California
- November 7, 1950
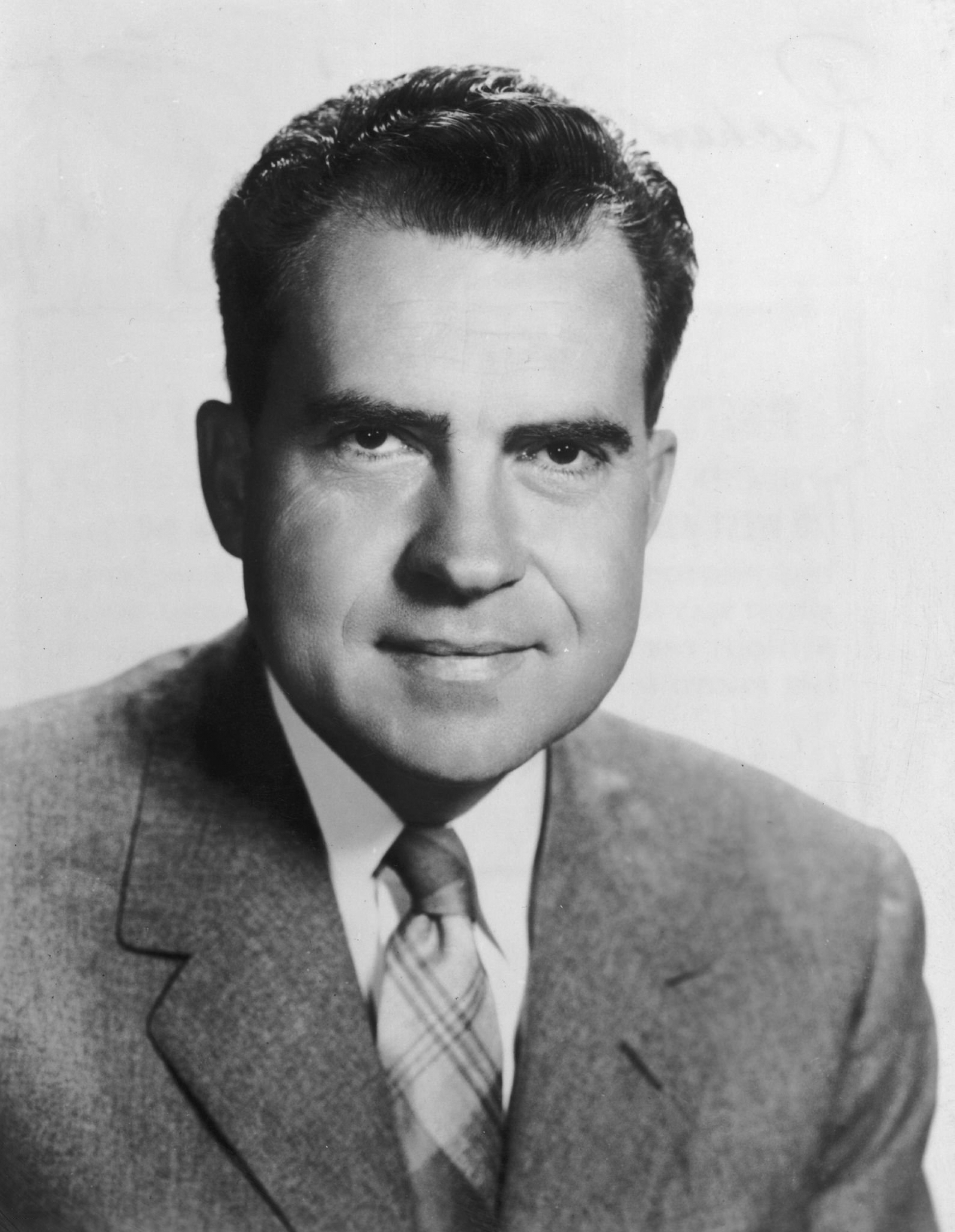

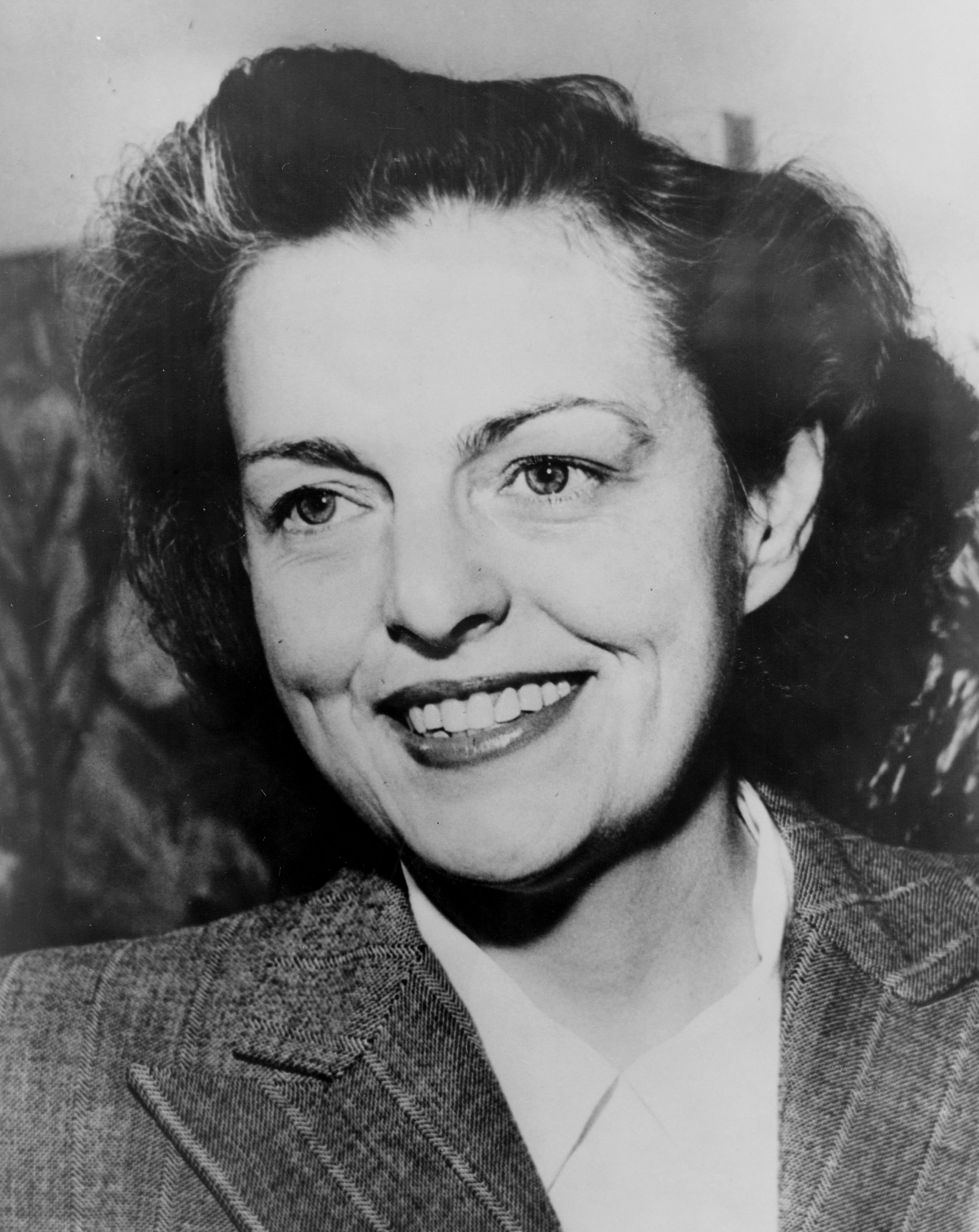
Nominee	Richard Nixon	Helen Gahagan Douglas
Party	Republican	Democratic
Popular vote	2,183,454	1,502,507
Percentage	59.23%	40.76%
- County results Nixon: 50–60% 60–70% 70–80% Douglas: 50–60%
U.S. senator before election
Sheridan Downey
Democratic
Elected U.S. Senator
Richard Nixon
Republican

California election
Party	Candidate	Votes	%
Republican	Richard Nixon	2,183,454	59.23%
Democratic	Helen Gahagan Douglas	1,502,507	40.76%
None	Scattering	354	0.01%
Majority		680,947	18.47%
Turnout		3,686,315	
Republican gain from Democratic			

== Colorado ==
1950 United States Senate election in Colorado
- November 7, 1950
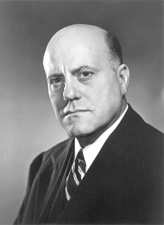

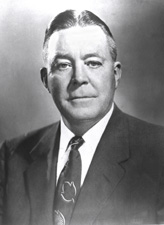
Nominee	Eugene Millikin	John A. Carroll
Party	Republican	Democratic
Popular vote	239,724	210,442
Percentage	53.25%	46.75%
- Results by county Millikin: 50–60% 60–70% Carroll: 50–60% 60–70%
U.S. senator before election
Eugene Millikin
Republican
Elected U.S. Senator
Eugene Millikin
Republican

Colorado election
Party	Candidate	Votes	%
Republican	Eugene Millikin (incumbent)	239,724	53.25%
Democratic	John A. Carroll	210,442	46.75%
Majority		29,282	6.50%
Turnout		450,166	
Republican hold			

== Connecticut ==
=== Connecticut (special) ===
1950 United States Senate special election in Connecticut
- November 7, 1950
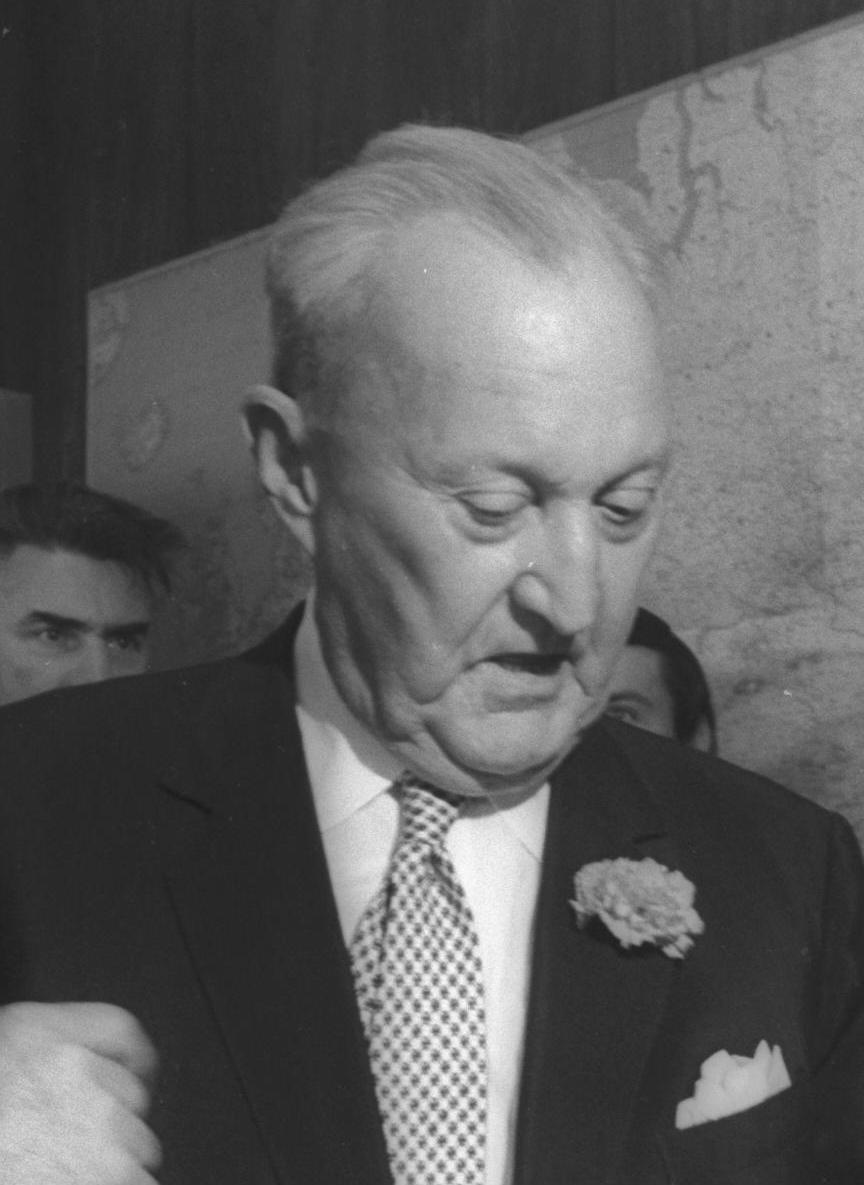

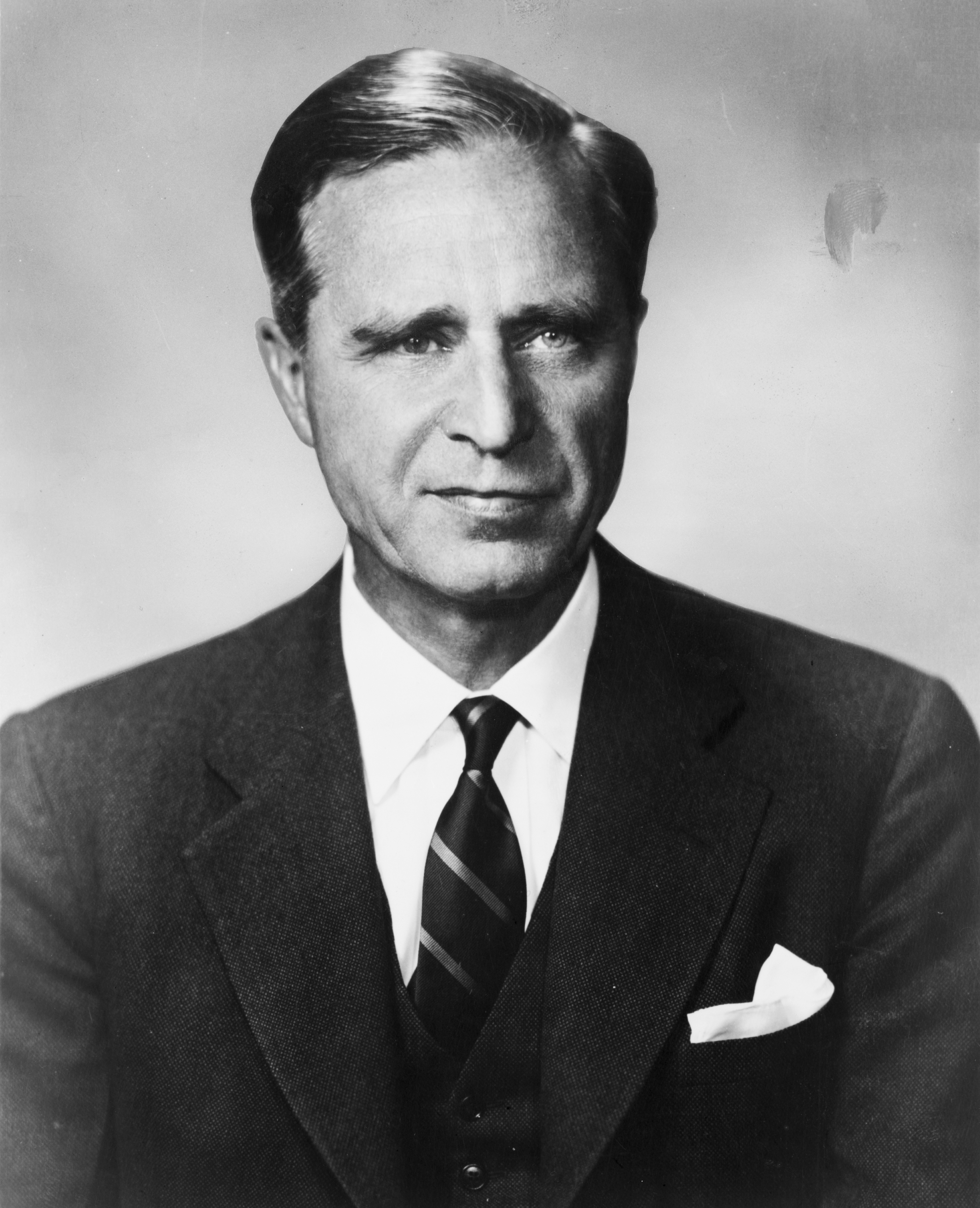
Nominee	William Benton	Prescott Bush
Party	Democratic	Republican
Popular vote	431,413	430,311
Percentage	49.18%	49.06%
- Benton: 40–50% 50–60% 60–70% Bush: 50–60% 60–70% 70–80% 80–90% Tie: 50%
U.S. senator before election
William Benton
Democratic
Elected U.S. Senator
William Benton
Democratic

Connecticut special election
Party	Candidate	Votes	%
Democratic	William Benton (incumbent)	431,413	49.18%
Republican	Prescott Bush	430,311	49.06%
Socialist	John J. Gillespie	15,441	1.76%
Majority		1,102	0.13%
Turnout		877,165	
Democratic hold			

=== Connecticut (regular) ===
1950 United States Senate election in Connecticut
- November 7, 1950
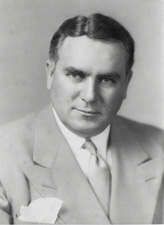

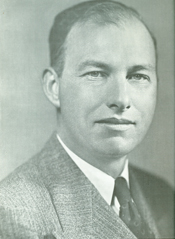
Nominee	Brien McMahon	Joseph E. Talbot
Party	Democratic	Republican
Popular vote	453,646	409,053
Percentage	51.68%	46.60%
- McMahon: 50–60% 60–70% 70–80% Talbot: 50–60% 60–70% 70–80% 80–90% No Data/Vote
U.S. senator before election
Brien McMahon
Democratic
Elected U.S. Senator
Brien McMahon
Democratic

Connecticut regular election
Party	Candidate	Votes	%
Democratic	Brien McMahon (incumbent)	453,646	51.68%
Republican	Joseph E. Talbot	409,053	46.60%
Socialist	Anthony R. Martino	15,128	1.72%
Majority		44,593	5.08%
Turnout		877,827	
Democratic hold			

== Florida ==
1950 United States Senate election in Florida
- November 7, 1950
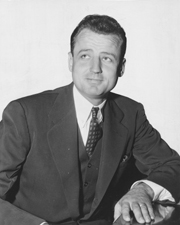

Nominee	George Smathers	John P. Booth
Party	Democratic	Republican
Popular vote	238,987	74,228
Percentage	76.30%	23.70%
- County results Smathers: 50–60% 60–70% 70–80% 80–90% >90% Booth: 50–60%
Senator before election
Claude Pepper
Democratic
Elected Senator
George Smathers
Democratic

Democratic incumbent Senator Claude Pepper lost renomination May 2, 1950 to George A. Smathers, who easily won the general election.

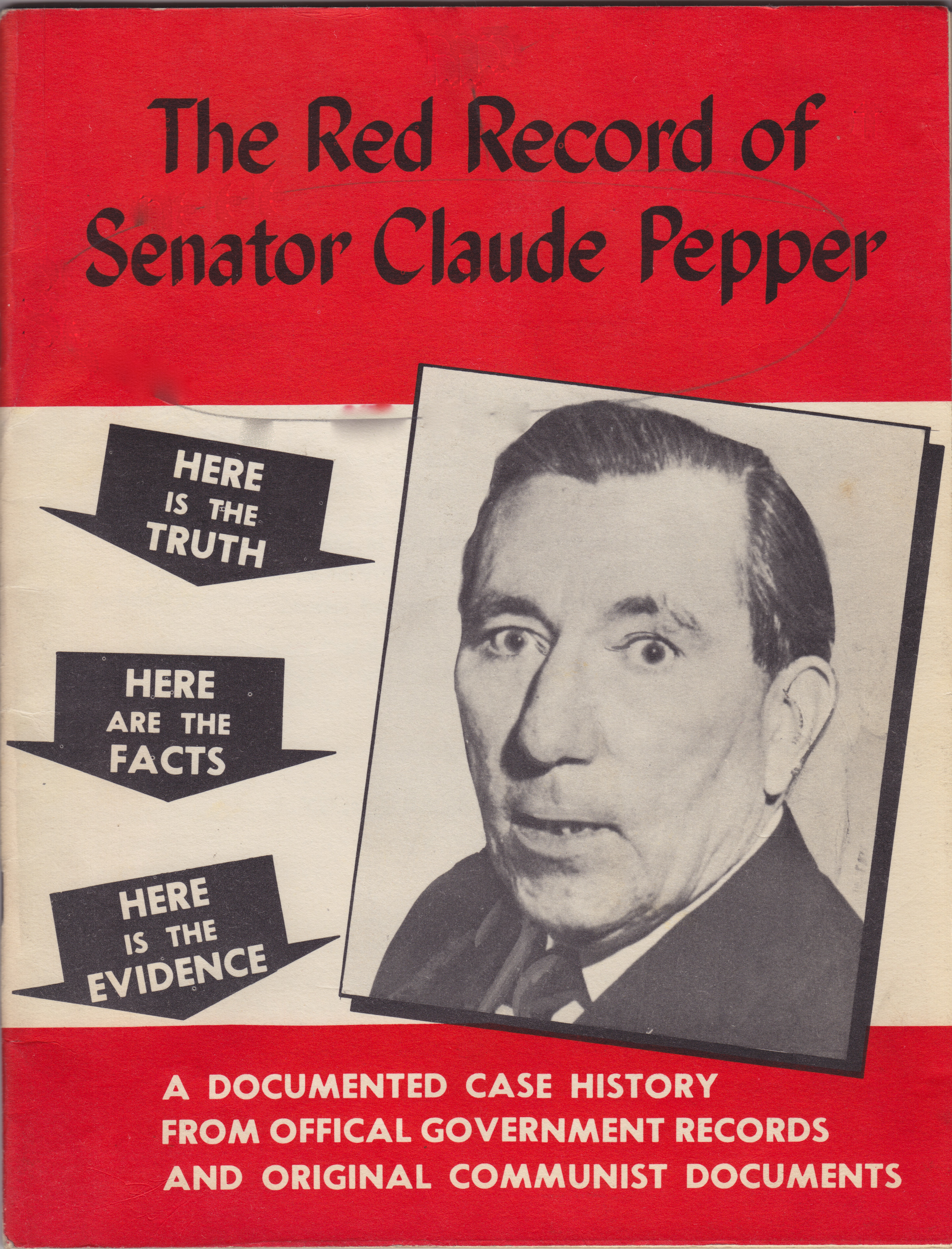
Front cover of The Red Record of Senator Claude Pepper

The Democratic primary for the 1950 United States Senate election in Florida was described as the "most bitter and ugly campaigns in Florida political history." Ormund Powers, a Central Florida historian, noted that ABC and NBC commentator David Brinkley said that "the Pepper-Smathers campaign would always stand out in his mind as the dirtiest in the history of American politics". On January 12, 1950, U.S. Representative George A. Smathers declared his candidacy for the race in Orlando at Kemp's Coliseum, where about 3,000 supporters had gathered. In his opening speech, Smathers accused Pepper of being "the leader of the radicals and extremists", an advocate of treason, and a person against the constitutional rights of Americans. Ed Ball, a power in state politics who had broken with Pepper, financed his opponent, Smathers.

Prior to the entry of Smathers and Pepper, Orlando attorney James G. Horrell campaigned for the seat. Horrell researched Pepper's weaknesses and the state's voters. Horrell also compiled a list of communist-front groups that Pepper had communicated with. On the day that Pepper declared his candidacy, Horrell withdrew and endorsed Smathers. Horrell also sent his reports about Pepper to Smathers, which he used throughout the next few months. This would also prevent the chance of a run-off election. In late February and early March, the Jacksonville Journal conducted a poll in 11 counties important for the election. Smathers led by about 2-to-1 and dominated in Duval, Pinellas, and Volusia counties, while he was also statistically tied with Pepper in Dade, Escambia, and Hillsborough counties. However, Smathers did not trail in any of the 11 counties.

Smathers repeatedly attacked "Red Pepper" for having communist sympathies, condemning both his support for universal health care and his alleged support for the Soviet Union. Pepper had traveled to the Soviet Union in 1945 and, after meeting Soviet leader Joseph Stalin, declared he was "a man Americans could trust." Additionally, although Pepper supported universal health care, sometimes referred to as "socialized medicine", Smathers would vote for "socialized medicine" in the Senate when it was introduced as Medicare in 1965. In The Saturday Evening Post, even respected writer and notorious anti-segregation editor Ralph McGill labeled Pepper a "spell-binding pinko". Beginning on March 28 and until the day of the primary, Smathers named one communist organization each day that Pepper addressed, starting with the American Slav Congress.

Pepper's opponents circulated widely a 49-page booklet titled The Red Record of Senator Claude Pepper. It contained photographs and headlines from several communist publications such as the Daily Worker. In April the Daily Worker endorsed Pepper, with Communist Party of Florida leader George Nelson warning that a Smathers victory would "strengthen the Dixiecrat-KKK forces in Florida as well as throughout the South." The booklet also made it seem as if Pepper desired to give Russia nuclear bomb-making instructions, billions of dollars, and the United States' natural resources. There was also a double-page montage of Pepper in 1946 at New York City's Madison Square Garden with progressive Henry A. Wallace and civil rights activist Paul Robeson, and quoted Pepper speaking favorably of both of them. Throughout the campaign, Pepper denied sympathizing with communism.

Simultaneous to this election, then-U.S. House Representative Richard Nixon was running for the Senate seat in California. In a letter from Senator Karl E. Mundt of South Dakota, he told Nixon that "It occurs to me that if Helen is your opponent in the fall, something of a similar nature might well be produced", in reference to The Red Record of Senator Claude Pepper and a similar Democratic primary between Manchester Boddy and Helen Gahagan Douglas.

Race also played a role in the election. Labor unions began a voter registration drive, which mostly added African Americans to the voter rolls. Smathers accused the "Northern labor bosses" of paying black people to register and vote for Pepper. Shortly after Smathers declared his candidacy, he indicated to the Florida Peace Officers Association that he would defend law enforcement officers for free if they were found guilty of civil rights violations. With the election occurring during the era of racial segregation, Pepper was portrayed as favoring integration and interracial marriage. He was also labeled a "nigger lover" and accused by Orlando Sentinel publisher Martin Andersen of shaking hands with a black woman in Sanford. In Dade County, which had a significant black and Jewish population, doctored photographs depicting Smathers in a Ku Klux Klan hood were distributed.

In the Groveland Case, four young African American men – Charles Greenlee, Walter Irvin, Samuel Shepherd, and Ernest Thomas – known as the Groveland Four, were accused of raping a 17-year old white women in Groveland on July 16, 1949. Thomas fled the area but was later shot and killed by police. Greenlee, Irvin, and Shepherd were convicted by an all-white jury. After the St. Petersburg Times questioned the verdict in April 1950, Lake County State Attorney J. W. Hunter, a supporter of Pepper, demanded that Pepper repudiate the news articles. However, Pepper refused. Hunter then denounced Pepper and endorsed Smathers. In addition to the racial violence, cross burning was also common at the time, with five in Jacksonville, ten in Orlando and Winter Park, and seventeen in the Tallahassee area.

With the accusation of "Northern labor bosses" sending "the carpetbaggers of 1950" to Florida on his behalf, Pepper reminded voters that Smathers was born in New Jersey and sometimes referred to him as a "damn Yankee intruder". In response, Smathers decorated speaking platform in the colors of his alma mater at the University of Florida, orange and blue, while informing his supporters that Pepper graduated from Harvard Law School.

Powers noted that throughout the campaign, "scarcely a day passed" without Andersen writing a news story, column, or editorial that was very positive of Smathers or highly critical of Pepper. Thirty-eight daily newspapers in Florida endorsed Smathers, while only the St. Petersburg Times and The Daytona Beach News-Journal endorsed Pepper. Among the newspapers that supported Smathers were the Miami Herald, owned by John S. Knight, and the Miami Daily News, published by James M. Cox, a former Governor of Ohio and the Democratic Party nominee for the 1920 presidential election. However, Pepper's aides compared this situation to when Alf Landon was endorsed by more editors and newspapers than Franklin Roosevelt in 1936, but received far fewer votes than him.

Smathers performed generally well across many areas of the state, with the exception of Miami, Tampa, and the Florida Panhandle. On the morning after the election, Andersen wrote on the front-page headline of the Orlando Sentinel, "Praise God From Whom All Blessings Flow ... We Have Won from Hell to Breakfast And From Dan to Beersheba ... And Staved Off Socialism", which was inspired by a headline in The New York Times celebrating Lawrence of Arabia's victory over the Turks in 1917.

Democratic primary results
Party	Candidate	Votes	%
Democratic	George Smathers	387,315	54.78%
Democratic	Claude Pepper	319,754	45.22%
Total votes		707,069	100%

Smathers defeated Republican John P. Booth in a landslide in the general election on November 7. Results indicated that Smathers received 76.3% of the vote compared to just 23.7% for Booth. In the popular vote, Smathers garnered 238,987 votes versus 74,228 for Booth. Smathers fared well throughout the state and won all but Pinellas County.

Florida election
Party	Candidate	Votes	%
Democratic	George A. Smathers	238,987	76.30%
Republican	John P. Booth	74,228	23.70%
Majority		164,759	52.60%
Turnout		313,215	
Democratic hold			

== Georgia ==
1950 U.S. Senate Democratic primary in Georgia
- June 28, 1950
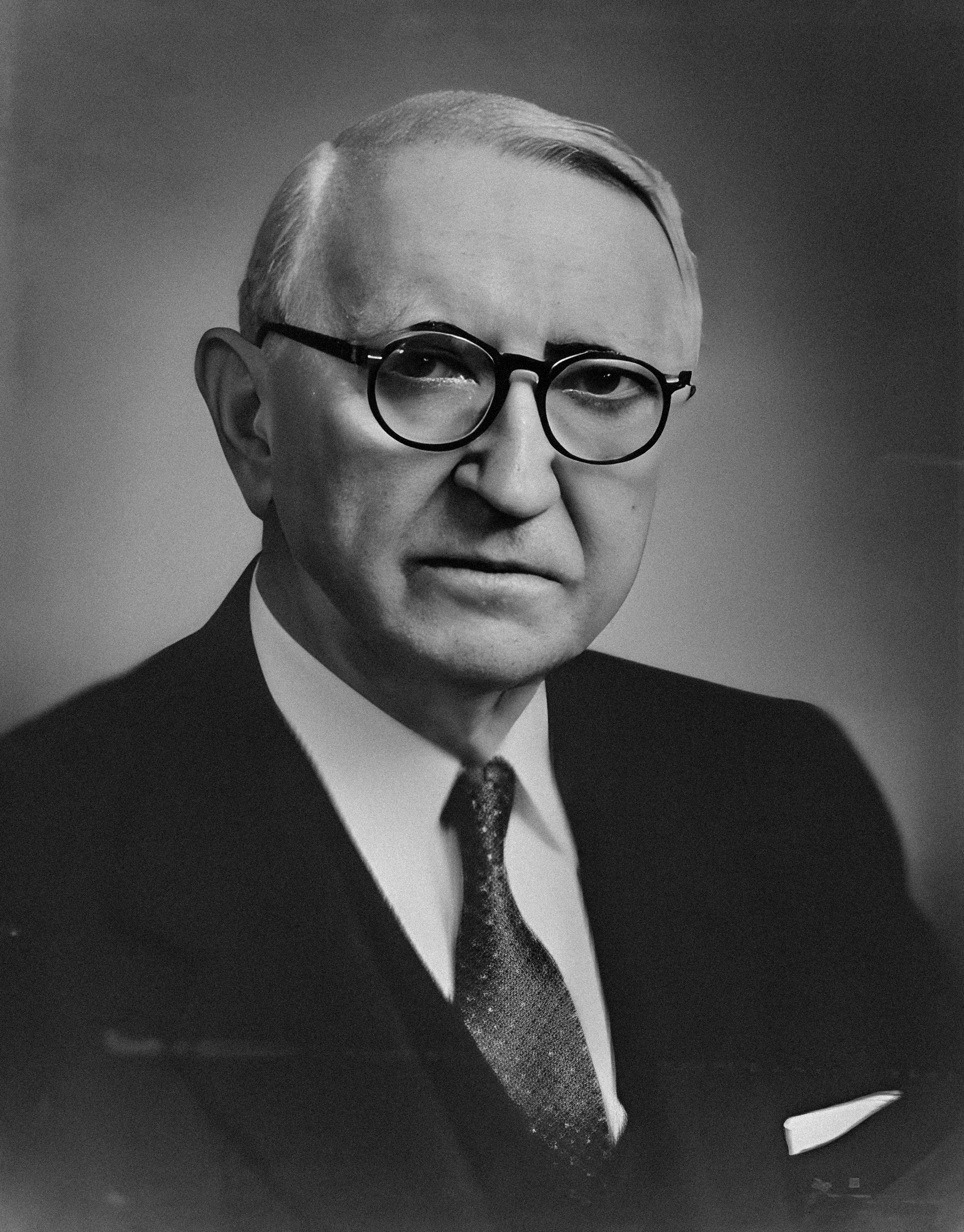

Nominee	Walter F. George	Alex McLennan
Party	Democratic	Democratic
Electoral vote	410	0
Popular vote	470,156	79,886
Percentage	82.50%	14.02%
U.S. senator before election
Walter F. George
Democratic
Elected U.S. Senator
Walter F. George
Democratic

Five-term Democratic Senator Walter F. George was re-elected without opposition.

Georgia election
Party	Candidate	Votes	%
Democratic	Walter F. George (incumbent)	261,290	100.00%
Democratic hold			

George would retire after this term.

== Idaho ==
There were two elections on the same day due to the October 8, 1949 death of one-term Democrat Bert H. Miller.

=== Idaho (special) ===
1950 United States Senate special election in Idaho
- November 7, 1950
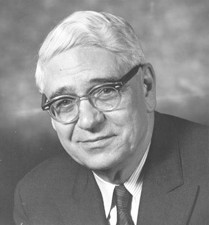
Nominee	Henry Dworshak	Claude J. Burtenshaw
Party	Republican	Democratic
Popular vote	104,608	97,092
Percentage	51.86%	48.14%
- County results Dworshak: 50–60% 60–70% Burtenshaw: 50–60% 60–70%
Senator before election
Henry Dworshak
Republican
Elected Senator
Henry Dworshak
Republican

Republican former-senator Henry Dworshak — who had lost re-election to Miller in 1948 — was appointed to continue the term pending a special election to the class 2 seat, which he then won.

Idaho special election
Party	Candidate	Votes	%
Republican	Henry Dworshak (incumbent)	104,608	51.86%
Democratic	Claude J. Burtenshaw	97,092	48.14%
Majority		7,516	3.72%
Turnout		201,700	34.27%
Republican hold			

=== Idaho (regular) ===
1950 United States Senate election in Idaho
- November 7, 1950
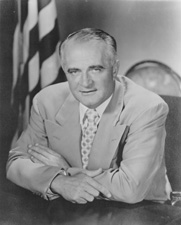

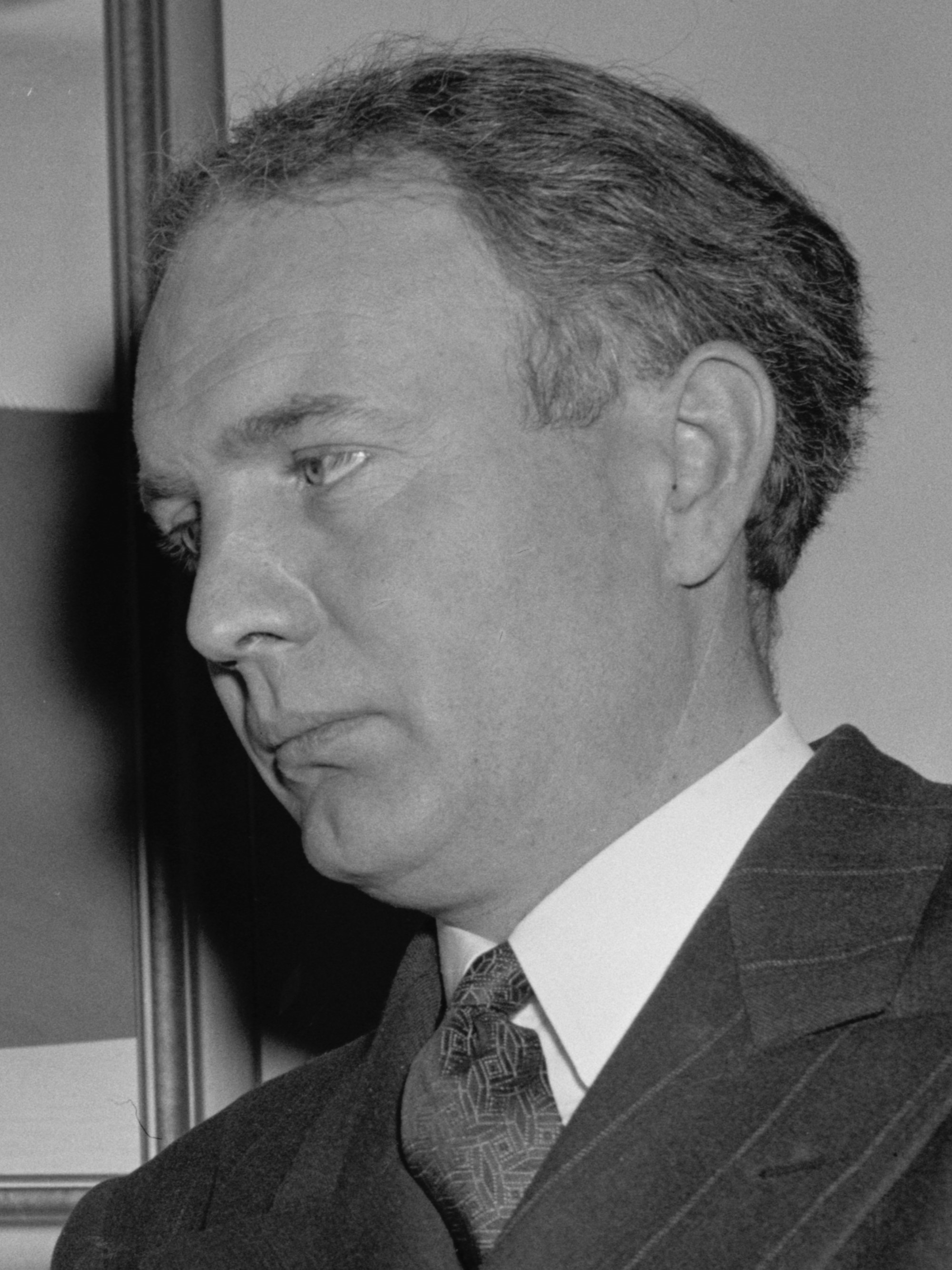
Nominee	Herman Welker	D. Worth Clark
Party	Republican	Democratic
Popular vote	124,237	77,180
Percentage	61.68%	38.32%
- County results Welker: 50–60% 60–70% 70–80% Clark: 50–60% 60–70%
Senator before election
Glen H. Taylor
Democratic
Elected Senator
Herman Welker
Republican

One-term Democrat Glen H. Taylor lost renomination to the class 3 seat to his predecessor D. Worth Clark. Taylor had beaten Clark for the Democratic nomination in 1944, and this year Clark did the same to him. However, in the general election, Clark was easily beaten by Republican State senator Herman Welker.

Idaho election
Party	Candidate	Votes	%
Republican	Herman Welker	124,237	61.68%
Democratic	D. Worth Clark	77,180	38.32%
Majority		47,057	23.36%
Turnout		201,417	34.22%
Republican gain from Democratic			

== Illinois ==
1950 United States Senate election in Illinois
- November 7, 1950
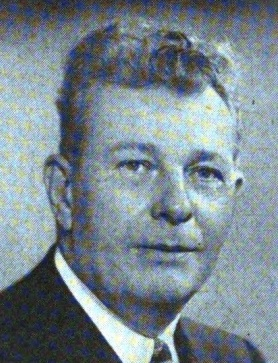

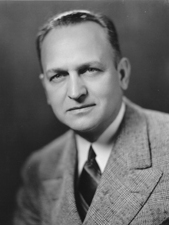
Nominee	Everett M. Dirksen	Scott W. Lucas
Party	Republican	Democratic
Popular vote	1,951,984	1,657,630
Percentage	53.88%	45.76%
- County results Dirksen: 40–50% 50–60% 60–70% 70–80% Lucas: 40–50% 50–60% 60–70%
Senator before election
Scott W. Lucas
Democratic
Elected Senator
Everett M. Dirksen
Republican

Illinois election
Party	Candidate	Votes	%
Republican	Everett Dirksen	1,951,984	53.88%
Democratic	Scott W. Lucas (incumbent)	1,657,630	45.76%
Prohibition	Enoch A. Holtwick	13,050	0.36%
Write-in	Others	9	0.00
Majority		294,354	8.12%
Turnout		3,622,673	
Republican gain from Democratic			

== Indiana ==
1950 United States Senate election in Indiana
- November 7, 1950
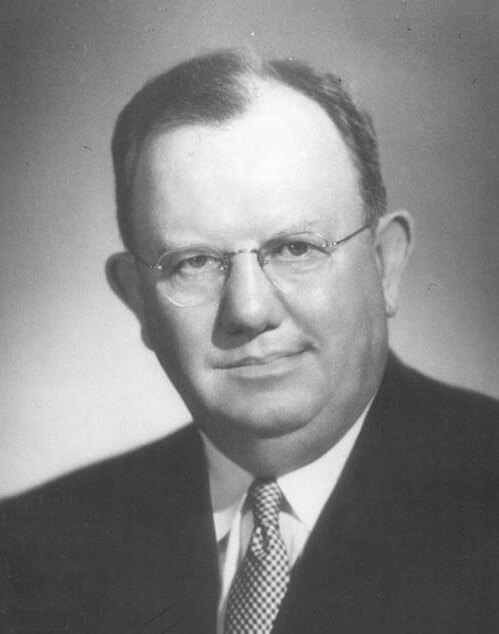

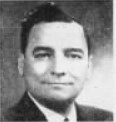
Nominee	Homer Capehart	Alexander M. Campbell
Party	Republican	Democratic
Popular vote	844,303	741,025
Percentage	52.81%	46.35%
- County results Capehart: 40–50% 50–60% 60–70% Campbell: 40–50% 50–60%
U.S. senator before election
Homer Capehart
Republican
Elected U.S. Senator
Homer Capehart
Republican

First-term Republican Homer E. Capehart was re-elected.

Indiana election
Party	Candidate	Votes	%
Republican	Homer E. Capehart (incumbent)	844,303	52.81%
Democratic	Alexander M. Campbell	741,025	46.35%
Prohibition	Lester N. Abel	13,396	0.84%
Majority		103,278	6.46%
Turnout		1,598,724	40.64%
Republican hold			

Capehart would win re-election again in 1956, but lose his seat in 1962.

== Iowa ==
1950 United States Senate election in Iowa
- November 7, 1950
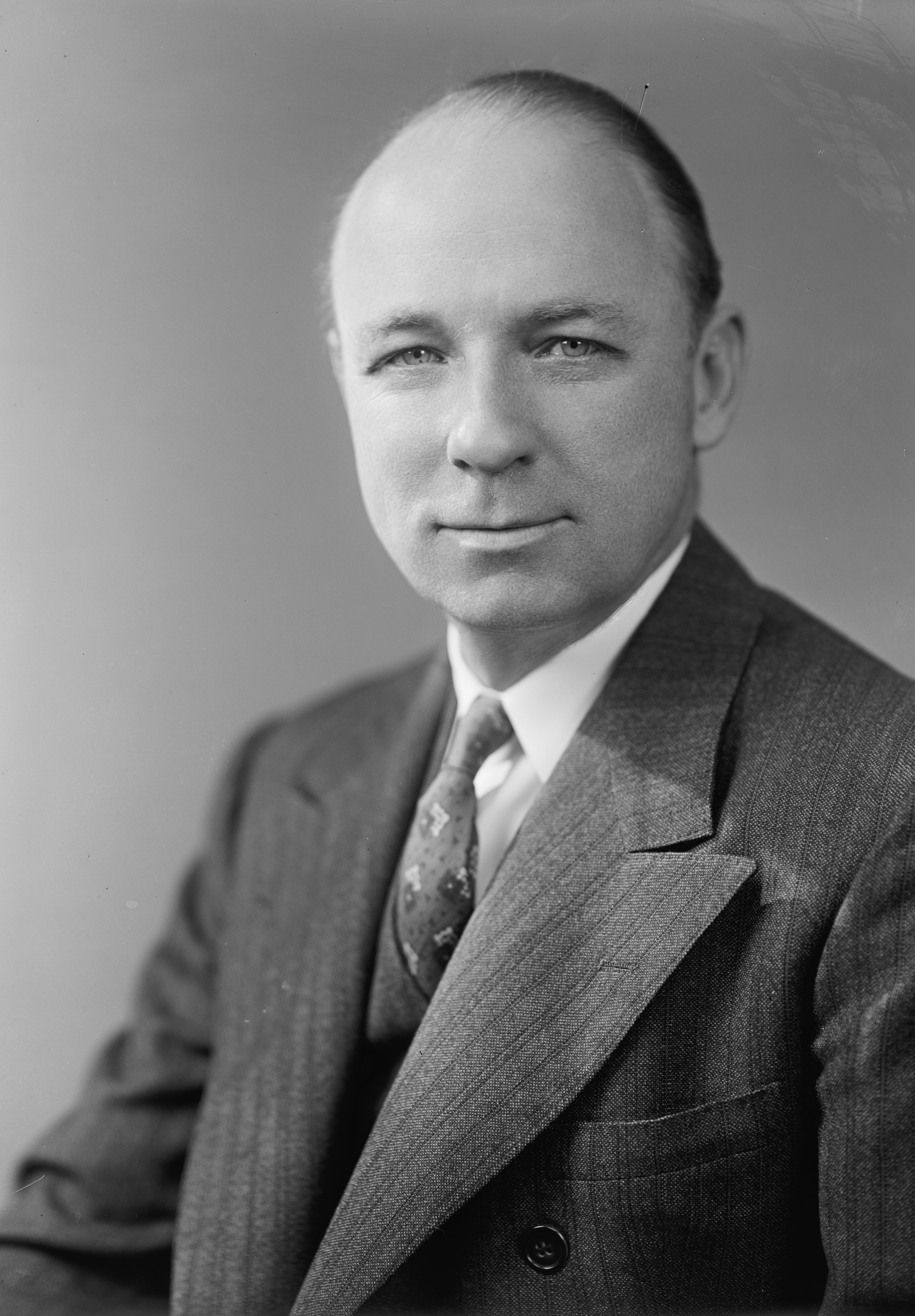

Nominee	Bourke B. Hickenlooper	Albert J. Loveland
Party	Republican	Democratic
Popular vote	470,613	383,766
Percentage	54.82%	44.70%
- Hickenlooper: 50–60% 60–70% Loveland: 40–50% 50–60%
U.S. senator before election
Bourke B. Hickenlooper
Republican
Elected U.S. Senator
Bourke B. Hickenlooper
Republican

One-term Republican Bourke B. Hickenlooper was re-elected.

Iowa election
Party	Candidate	Votes	%
Republican	Bourke B. Hickenlooper (incumbent)	470,613	54.82%
Democratic	Albert J. Loveland	383,766	44.70%
Prohibition	Z. Everett Kellum	3,273	0.38%
States' Rights	Ernest J. Seemann	571	0.07%
Socialist Labor	Leslie O. Ludwig	300	0.03%
Majority		86,847	10.12%
Turnout		858,523	32.75%
Republican hold			

Hickenlooper would continue serving in the Senate until his retirement in 1969.

== Kansas ==
There were two elections to the same seat on the same day due to the November 8, 1949 death of two-term Republican Clyde M. Reed. Governor of Kansas Frank Carlson appointed fellow Republican Harry Darby December 2, 1949 to continue the term, pending a special election. Carlson won both elections and was seated November 29, 1950.

=== Kansas (special) ===
1950 United States Senate special election in Kansas
- November 7, 1950
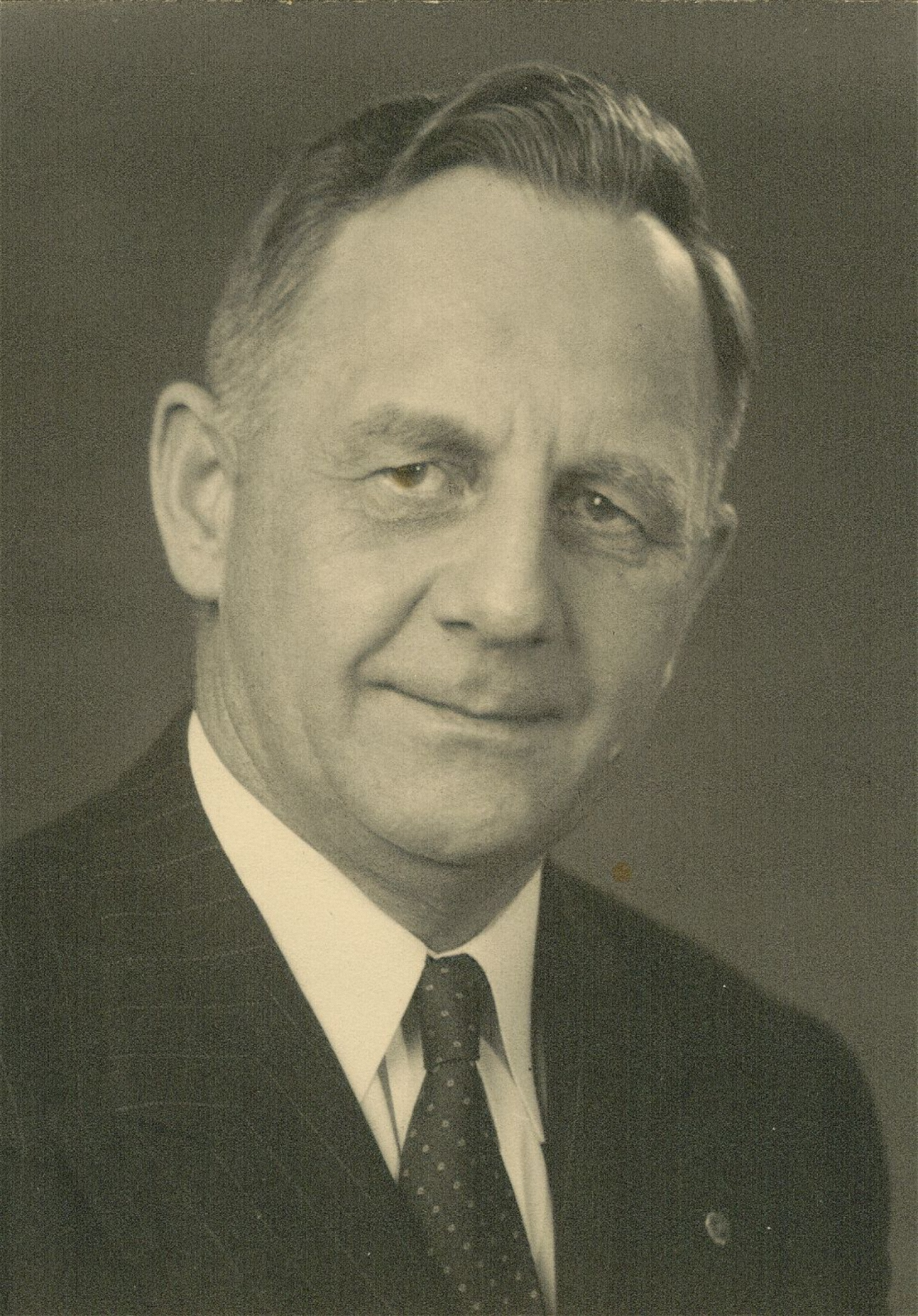
Nominee	Frank Carlson	Paul Aiken
Party	Republican	Democratic
Popular vote	321,718	261,405
Percentage	55.17%	44.83%
- County results Carlson: 50–60% 60–70% Aiken: 50–60%
Senator before election
Harry Darby
Republican
Elected Senator
Frank Carlson
Republican

Kansas special election
Party	Candidate	Votes	%
Republican	Frank Carlson	321,718	55.17%
Democratic	Paul Aiken	261,405	44.83%
Majority		60,313	10.34%
Turnout		583,123	30.61%
Republican hold			

=== Kansas (regular) ===
1950 United States Senate special election in Kansas
- November 7, 1950
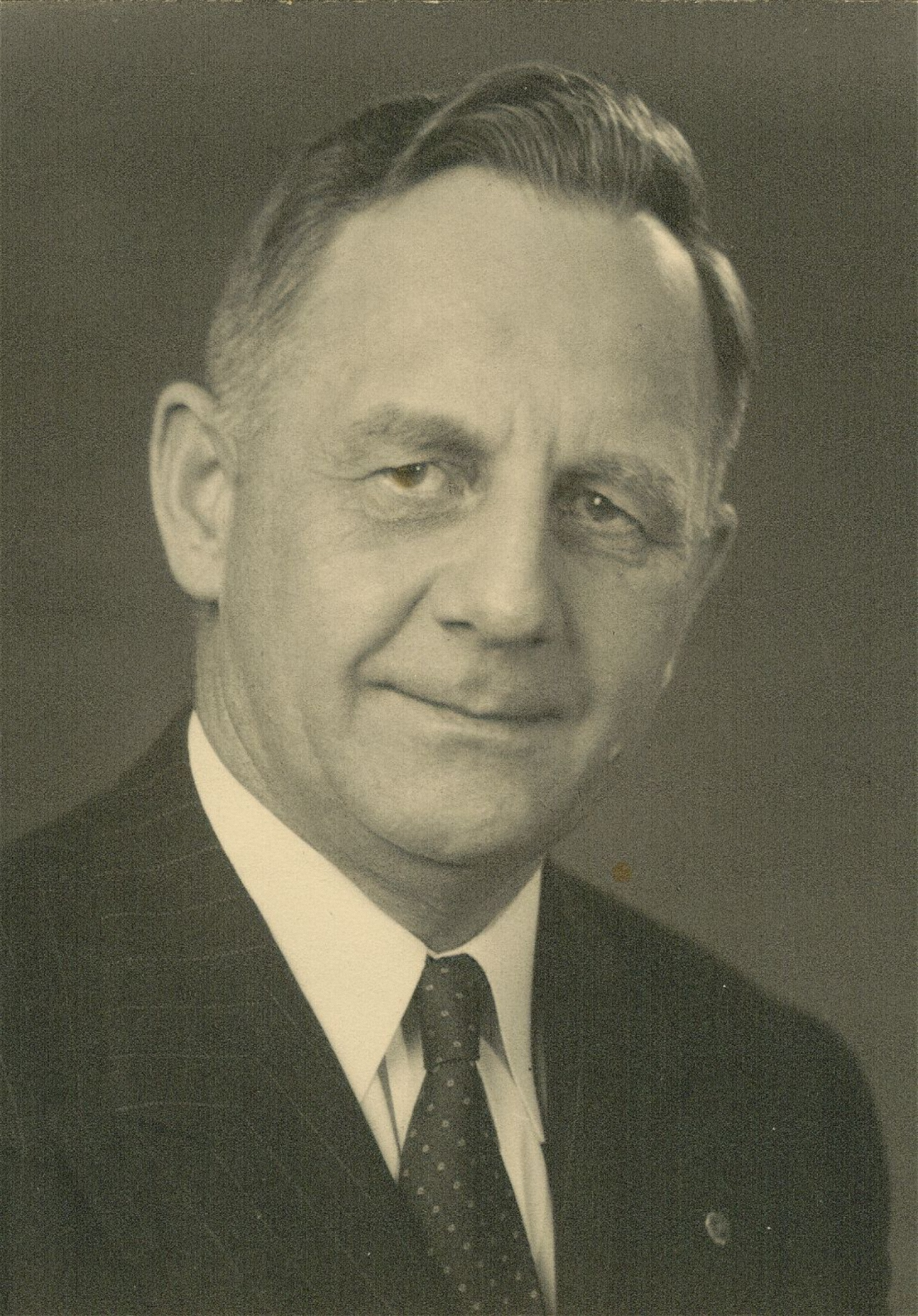
Nominee	Frank Carlson	Paul Aiken
Party	Republican	Democratic
Popular vote	335,880	271,365
Percentage	54.25%	43.83%
- County results Carlson: 40–50% 50–60% 60–70% Aiken: 40–50% 50–60%
Senator before election
Harry Darby
Republican
Elected Senator
Frank Carlson
Republican

Kansas regular election
Party	Candidate	Votes	%
Republican	Frank Carlson	335,880	54.25%
Democratic	Paul Aiken	271,365	43.83%
Prohibition	Verne L. Damon	11,859	1.92%
Majority		64,515	10.42%
Turnout		619,104	32.49%
Republican hold			

== Kentucky ==
There were two elections to the same seat on the same day, due to the January 19, 1949 resignation of Democrat Alben W. Barkley to become U.S. vice president. Governor of Kentucky Earle Clements appointed fellow Democrat Garrett L. Withers to continue the term, pending a special election. The winner of the special election would complete the current term, from November until the start of the next Congress on January 3, while the regular election was for the full term from 1951 to 1957. Clements, himself, won both elections and was sworn in on November 27, 1950. Withers later served one term in the U.S. House of Representatives.

=== Kentucky (special) ===
Kentucky special election
Party	Candidate	Votes	%
Democratic	Earle Clements	317,320	54.40%
Republican	Charles I. Dawson	265,994	45.60%
Majority		51,326	8.80%
Turnout		583,314	19.82%
Democratic hold			

=== Kentucky (regular) ===
Kentucky election

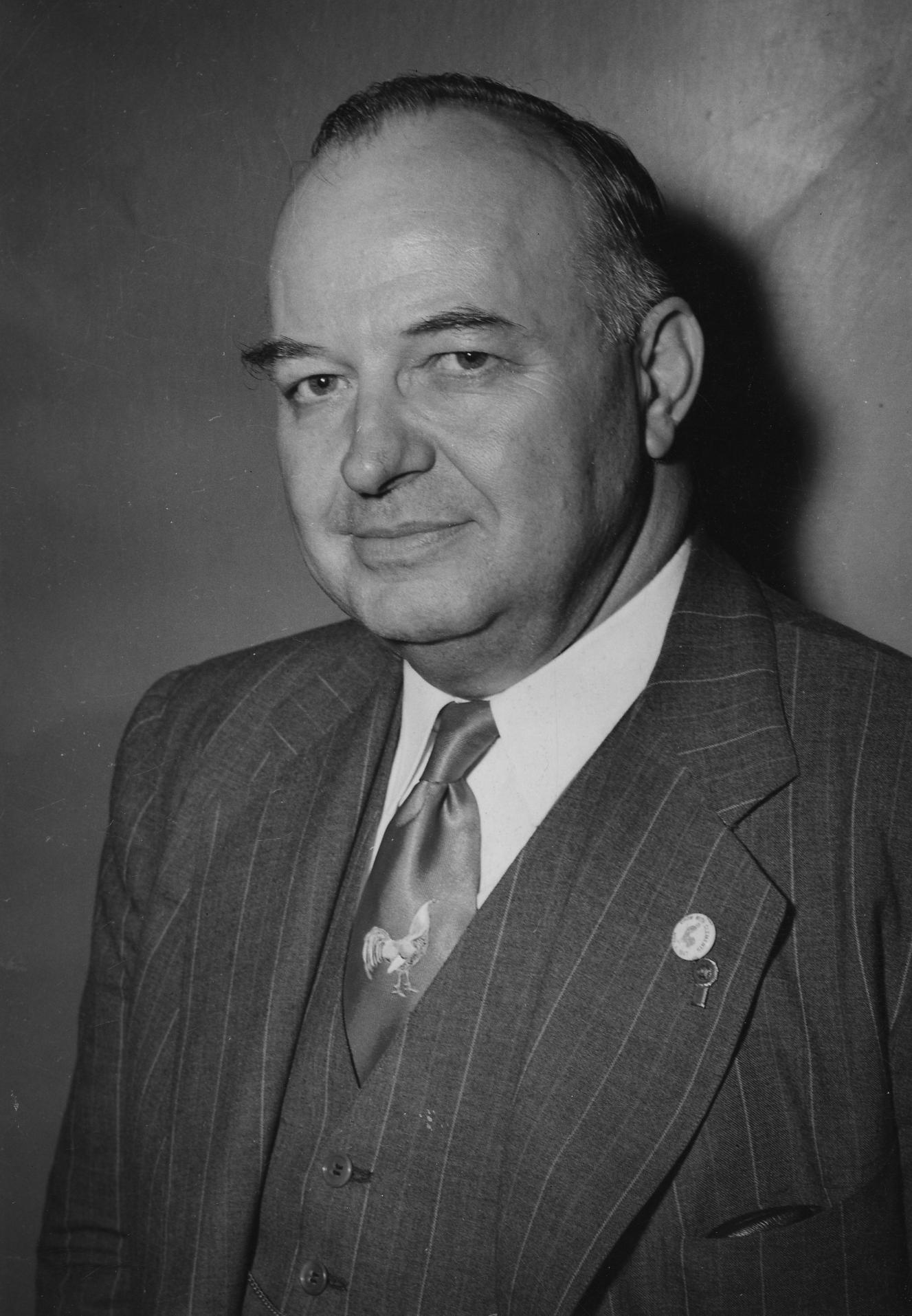

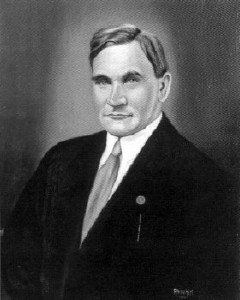
Nominee	Earle Clements	Charles I. Dawson
Party	Democratic	Republican
Popular vote	334,249	278,368
Percentage	54.16%	45.11%
- County results Clements: 40–50% 50–60% 60–70% 70–80% 80–90% Dawson: 40–50% 50–60% 60–70% 70–80% 80–90%
U.S. senator before election
Garrett L. Withers
Democratic
Elected U.S. senator
Earle Clements
Democratic

Kentucky regular election
Party	Candidate	Votes	%
Democratic	Earle Clements	334,249	54.16%
Republican	Charles I. Dawson	278,368	45.11%
Independent	James E. Olson	4,496	0.73%
Majority		55,881	9.05%
Turnout		617,113	
Democratic hold			

== Louisiana ==
1950 United States Senate election in Louisiana
- November 7, 1950
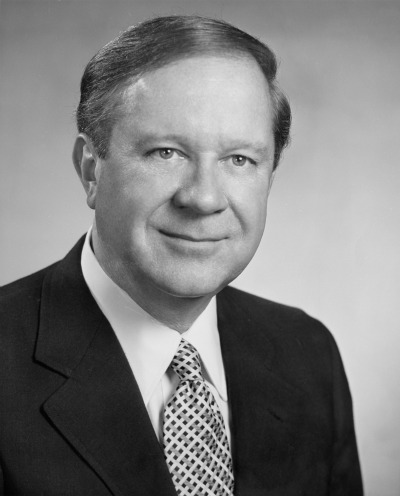

Nominee	Russell B. Long	Charles S. Gerth
Party	Democratic	Republican
Popular vote	220,907	30,931
Percentage	87.72%	12.28%
- Parish results Long: 70–80% 80–90% >90%
U.S. senator before election
Russell B. Long
Democratic
Elected U.S. Senator
Russell B. Long
Democratic

Louisiana election
Party	Candidate	Votes	%
Democratic	Russell Long (incumbent)	220,907	87.72%
Republican	Charles S. Gerth	30,931	12.28%
Majority		189,976	75.44%
Turnout		251,838	
Democratic hold			

== Maryland ==
1950 United States Senate election in Maryland
- November 7, 1950
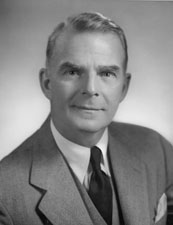

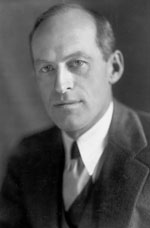
Nominee	John Marshall Butler	Millard Tydings
Party	Republican	Democratic
Popular vote	326,291	283,180
Percentage	53.00%	46.00%
- County results Butler: 50–60% 60–70% Tydings: 40–50% 50–60% 60–70%
U.S. senator before election
Millard Tydings
Democratic
Elected U.S. Senator
John Marshall Butler
Republican

Maryland election
Party	Candidate	Votes	%
Republican	John Marshall Butler	326,921	53.00%
Democratic	Millard E. Tydings (incumbent)	283,180	46.00%
Progressive	Sam Fox	6,143	1.00%
Majority		43,741	7.00%
Turnout		615,614	
Republican gain from Democratic			

== Missouri ==
Missouri election
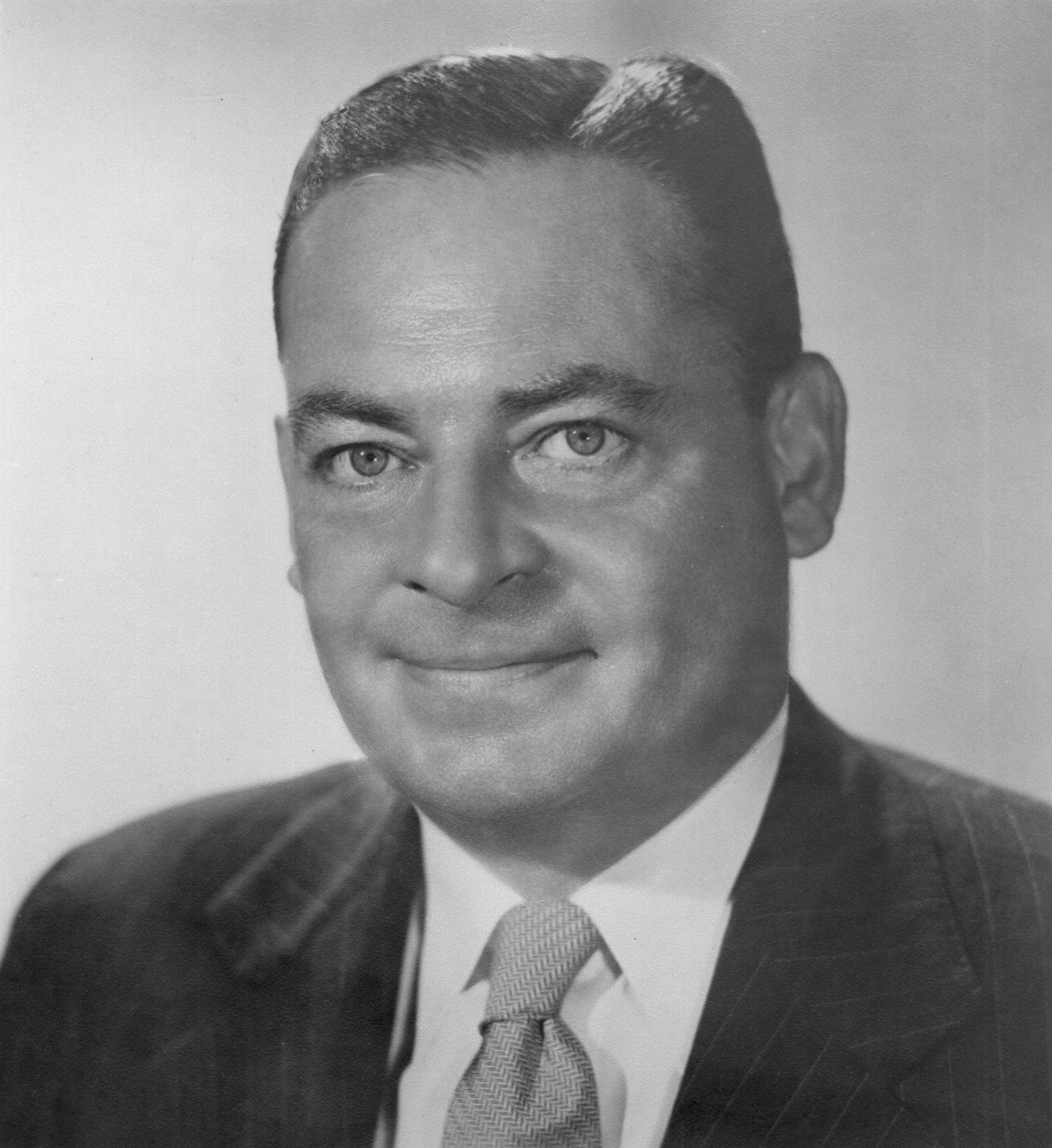

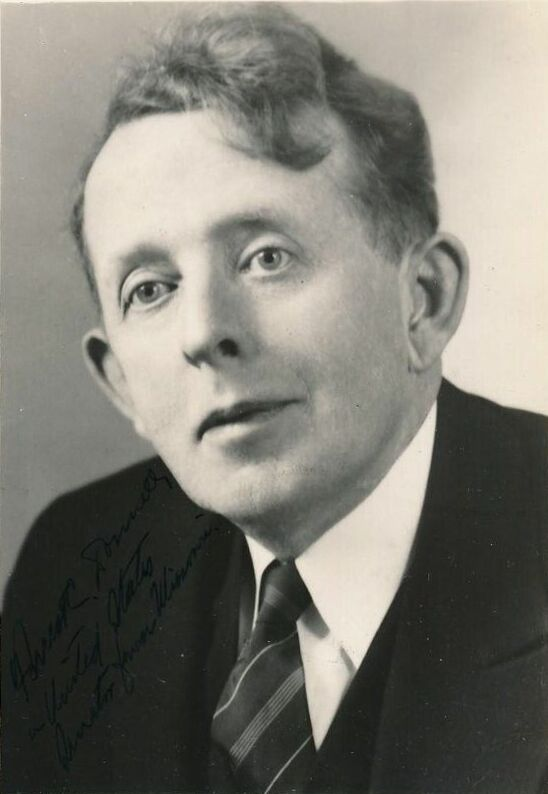
Nominee	Thomas C. Hennings Jr.	Forrest C. Donnell
Party	Democratic	Republican
Popular vote	685,732	592,922
Percentage	53.60%	46.34%
- County results Hennings: 50–60% 60–70% 70–80% 80–90% Donnell: 50–60% 60–70% 70–80% 80–90%
U.S. senator before election
Edward V. Long
Democratic
Elected U.S. senator
Edward V. Long
Democratic

Missouri election
Party	Candidate	Votes	%
Democratic	Thomas C. Hennings Jr.	685,732	53.60%
Republican	Forrest C. Donnell (incumbent)	592,922	46.34%
Christian Nationalist	John W. Hamilton	610	0.05%
Socialist Labor	Henry W. Genck	150	0.01%
Majority		92,810	7.26%
Turnout		1,279,414	
Democratic gain from Republican			

== Nevada ==
1950 United States Senate election in Nevada
- November 7, 1950
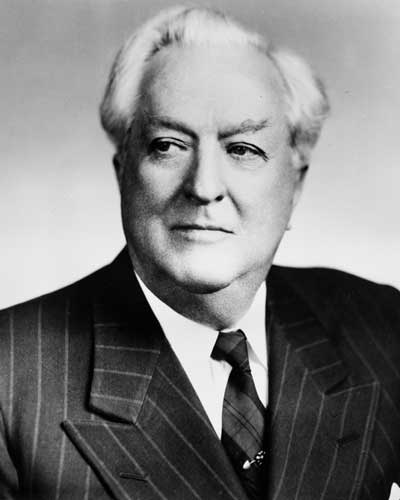

Nominee	Pat McCarran	George E. Marshall
Party	Democratic	Republican
Popular vote	35,829	25,993
Percentage	58.01%	41.99%
- County results McCarran: 50–60% 60–70% 70–80% Marshall: 50–60%
U.S. senator before election
Pat McCarran
Democratic
Elected U.S. Senator
Pat McCarran
Democratic

Nevada election
Party	Candidate	Votes	%
Democratic	Pat McCarran (incumbent)	35,829	58.01%
Republican	George E. Marshall	25,933	41.99%
Majority		9,896	16.02%
Turnout		61,762	
Democratic hold			

== New Hampshire ==
1950 United States Senate election in New Hampshire
- November 7, 1950
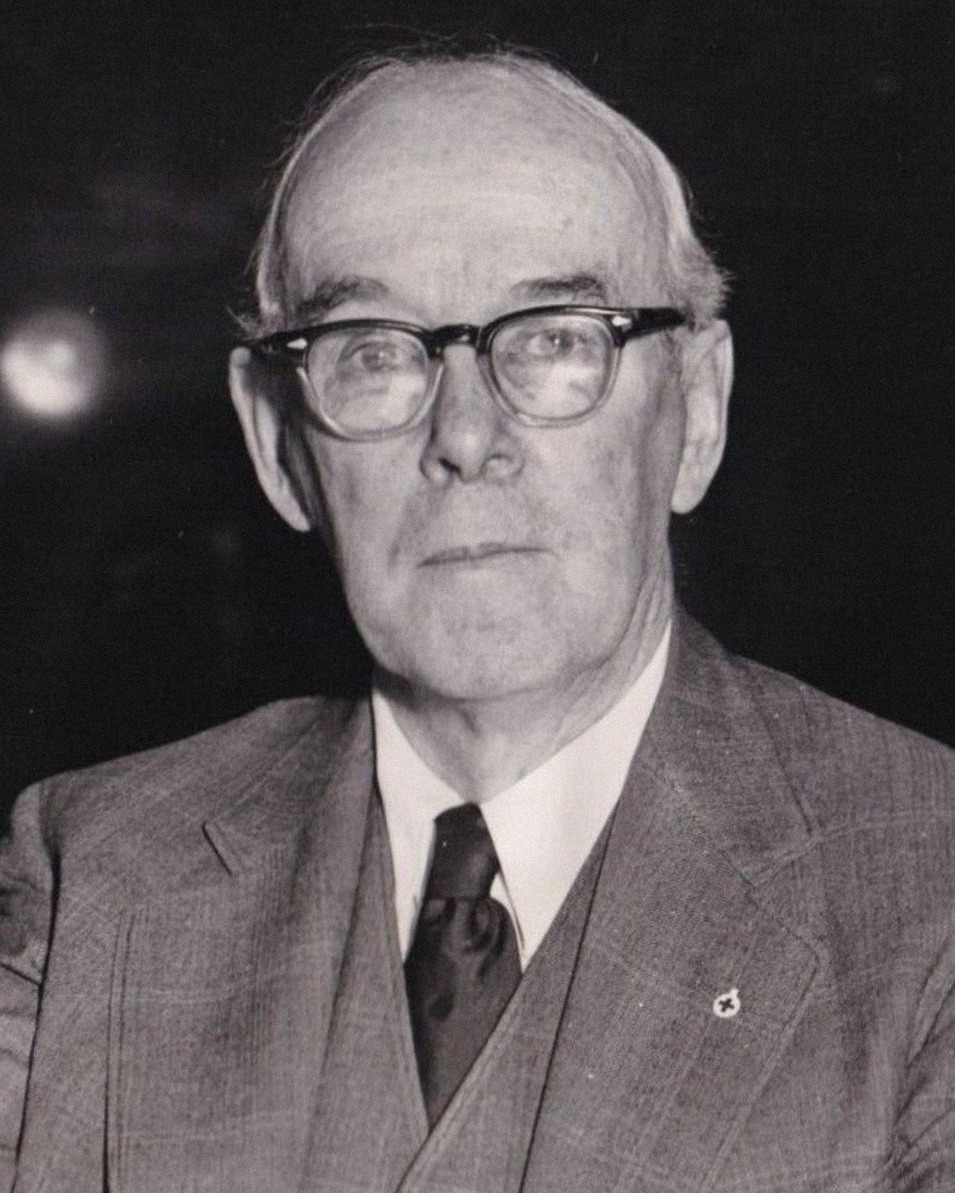
Nominee	Charles W. Tobey	Emmet J. Kelley
Party	Republican	Democratic
Popular vote	106,142	72,473
Percentage	55.99%	38.23%
- Tobey: 40–50% 50–60% 60–70% 70–80% 80–90% 90-100% Kelley: 40–50% 50–60% 60–70% 70–80% Kelley: 40–50%
Senator before election
Charles W. Tobey
Republican
Elected Senator
Charles W. Tobey
Republican

New Hampshire election
Party	Candidate	Votes	%
Republican	Charles W. Tobey (incumbent)	106,142	55.99%
Democratic	Emmet J. Kelley	72,473	38.23%
Write-In	Wesley Powell	10,943	5.77%
Majority		33,669	17.76%
Turnout		189,558	
Republican hold			

== New York ==
1950 United States Senate election in New York
- November 7, 1950
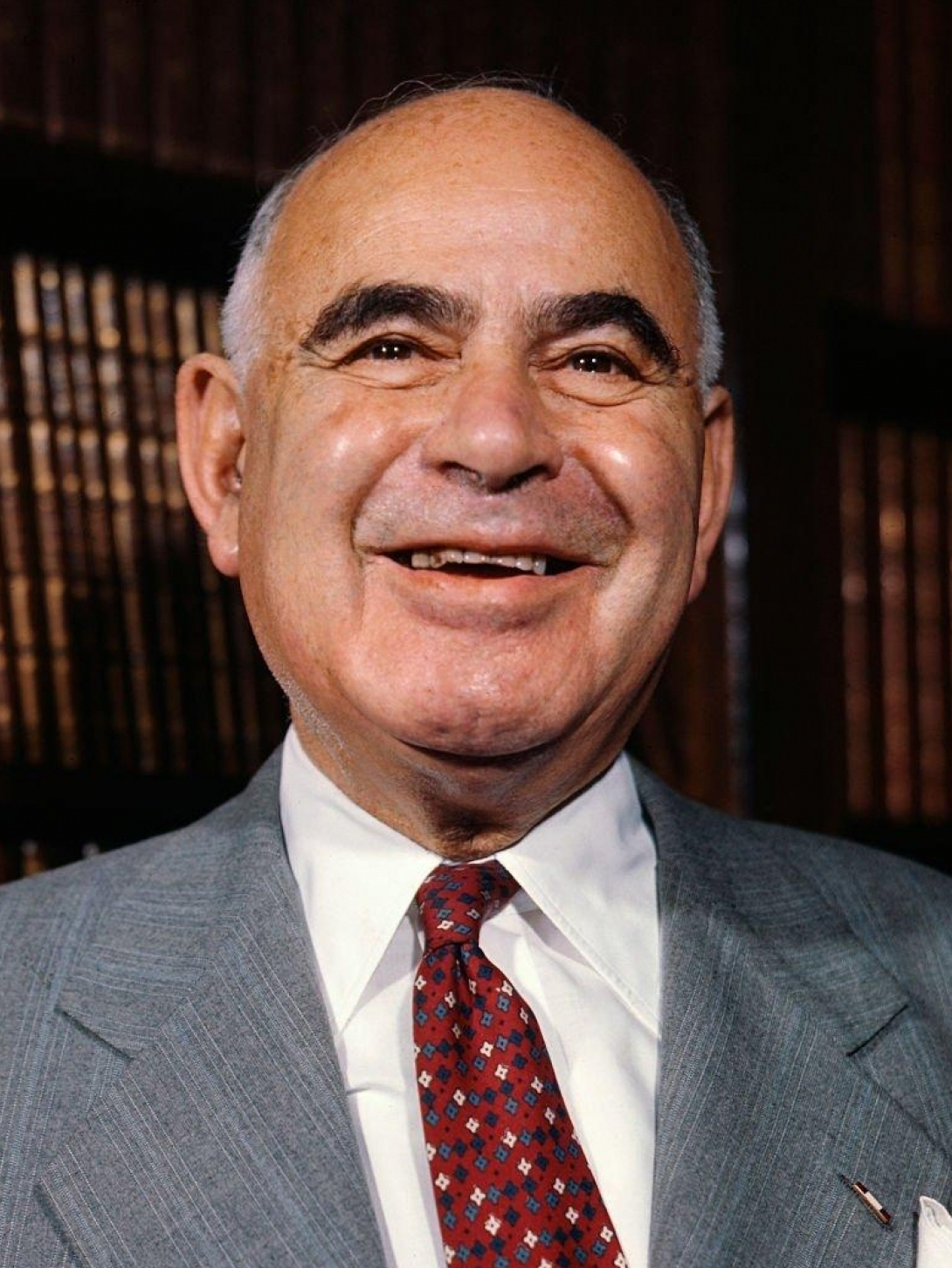

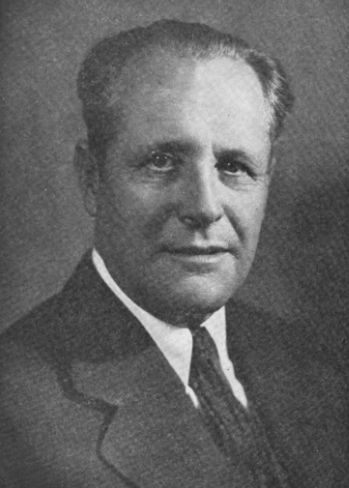
Nominee	Herbert H. Lehman	Joe Hanley
Party	Democratic	Republican
Alliance	Liberal
Popular vote	2,632,313	2,367,353
Percentage	50.35%	45.28%
- County results Lehman: 40–50% 50–60% 60–70% Hanley: 40–50% 50–60% 60–70% 70–80%
Senator before election
Herbert H. Lehman
Democratic
Elected Senator
Herbert H. Lehman
Democratic

The Socialist Workers state convention met on July 9, and nominated Joseph Hansen for the U.S. Senate.

The American Labor state convention met on September 6 and nominated W.E.B. DuBois for the U.S. Senate.

The Republican state convention met on September 7 at Saratoga Springs, New York. They re-nominated Lieutenant Governor Joe R. Hanley for the U.S. Senate.

The Democratic state convention met on September 7 at Rochester, New York, and re-nominated the incumbent U.S. senator Herbert H. Lehman.

The Liberal state convention met on September 6 and 7 at the Statler Hotel in New York City, and endorsed Democratic nominee Lehman.

Nearly the whole Republican statewide ticket was elected in a landslide, with only the Democratic incumbent U.S. senator, Ex-Governor Herbert H. Lehman, managing to stay in office.

New York election
Party	Candidate	Votes	%
Democratic	Herbert H. Lehman (incumbent)	2,319,719	44.37%
Republican	Joe R. Hanley	2,367,353	45.28%
Liberal	Herbert H. Lehman (incumbent)	312,594	5.98%
American Labor	W. E. B. Du Bois	205,729	3.93%
Socialist Workers	Joseph Hansen	13,340	0.29%
Industrial Government	Stephen Emery	7,559	0.15%
Majority		264,960	5.07%
Turnout		5,228,394	
Democratic hold			

== North Carolina ==
There were two elections in North Carolina.

=== North Carolina (special) ===
1950 United States Senate special election in North Carolina
- November 7, 1950
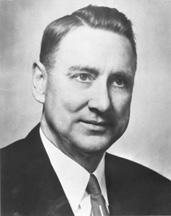

Nominee	Willis Smith	E. L. Galvin
Party	Democratic	Republican
Popular vote	364,912	177,753
Percentage	66.97%	32.62%
- County results Smith: 50–60% 60–70% 70–80% 80–90% 90–100% Galvin: 50–60% 60–70% 70–80%
Senator before election
Frank P. Graham
Democratic
Elected Senator
Willis Smith
Democratic

North Carolina special election
Party	Candidate	Votes	%
Democratic	Willis Smith	364,912	66.97%
Republican	E. L. Galvin	177,753	32.62%
Write-In	Frank P. Graham (incumbent)	2,259	0.41%
Majority		187,159	34.35%
Turnout		544,924	
Democratic hold			

=== North Carolina (regular) ===
1950 United States Senate election in North Carolina
- November 7, 1950
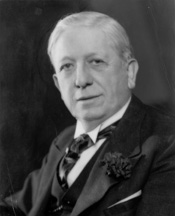

Nominee	Clyde R. Hoey	Halsey B. Leavitt
Party	Democratic	Republican
Popular vote	376,472	171,804
Percentage	68.67%	31.34%
- County results Hoey: 50–60% 60–70% 70–80% 80–90% 90–100% Leavitt: 50–60% 60–70% 70–80%
Senator before election
Clyde R. Hoey
Democratic
Elected Senator
Clyde R. Hoey
Democratic

North Carolina election
Party	Candidate	Votes	%
Democratic	Clyde R. Hoey (incumbent)	376,472	68.66%
Republican	Halsey B. Leavitt	171,804	31.34%
Majority		204,668	37.32%
Turnout		548,276	
Democratic hold			

== North Dakota ==
1950 United States Senate election in North Dakota
- November 7, 1950
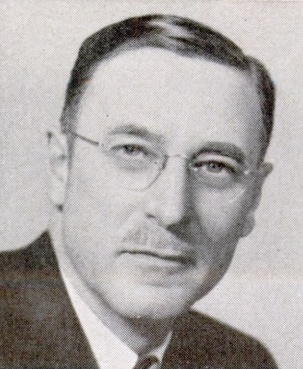

Nominee	Milton Young	Harry O'Brien
Party	Republican	Democratic
Popular vote	126,209	60,507
Percentage	67.59%	32.41%
- County results Young: 50–60% 60–70% 70–80% 80–90% O'Brien: 50–60%
U.S. senator before election
Milton Young
Republican
Elected U.S. Senator
Milton Young
Republican

North Dakota election
Party	Candidate	Votes	%
Republican	Milton R. Young (incumbent)	126,209	67.59%
Democratic	Harry O’Brien	60,507	32.41%
Majority		65,702	35.18%
Turnout		186,716	
Republican hold			

== Ohio ==
1950 United States Senate election in Ohio
- November 7, 1950
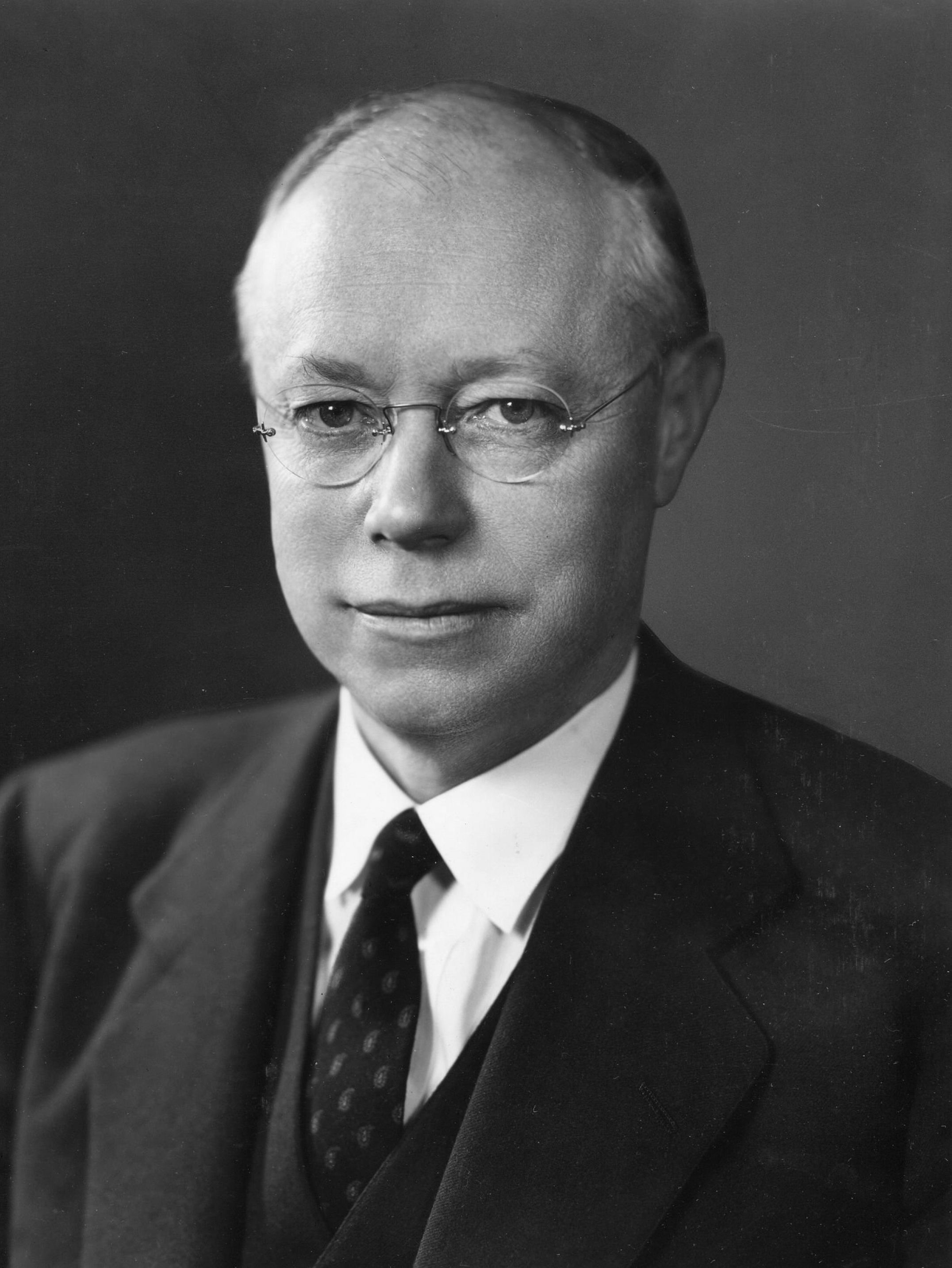
Nominee	Robert A. Taft	Joe Ferguson
Party	Republican	Democratic
Popular vote	1,645,643	1,214,459
Percentage	57.54%	42.46%
- County results Taft: 50–60% 60–70% 70–80% Ferguson: 50–60% 60–70%
U.S. senator before election
Robert A. Taft
Republican
Elected U.S. Senator
Robert A. Taft
Republican

Ohio election
Party	Candidate	Votes	%
Republican	Robert A. Taft (incumbent)	1,645,643	57.54%
Democratic	Joseph T. Ferguson	1,214,459	42.46%
Majority		431,184	15.08%
Turnout		2,860,102	
Republican hold			

== Oklahoma ==
1950 United States Senate election in Oklahoma
- November 7, 1950
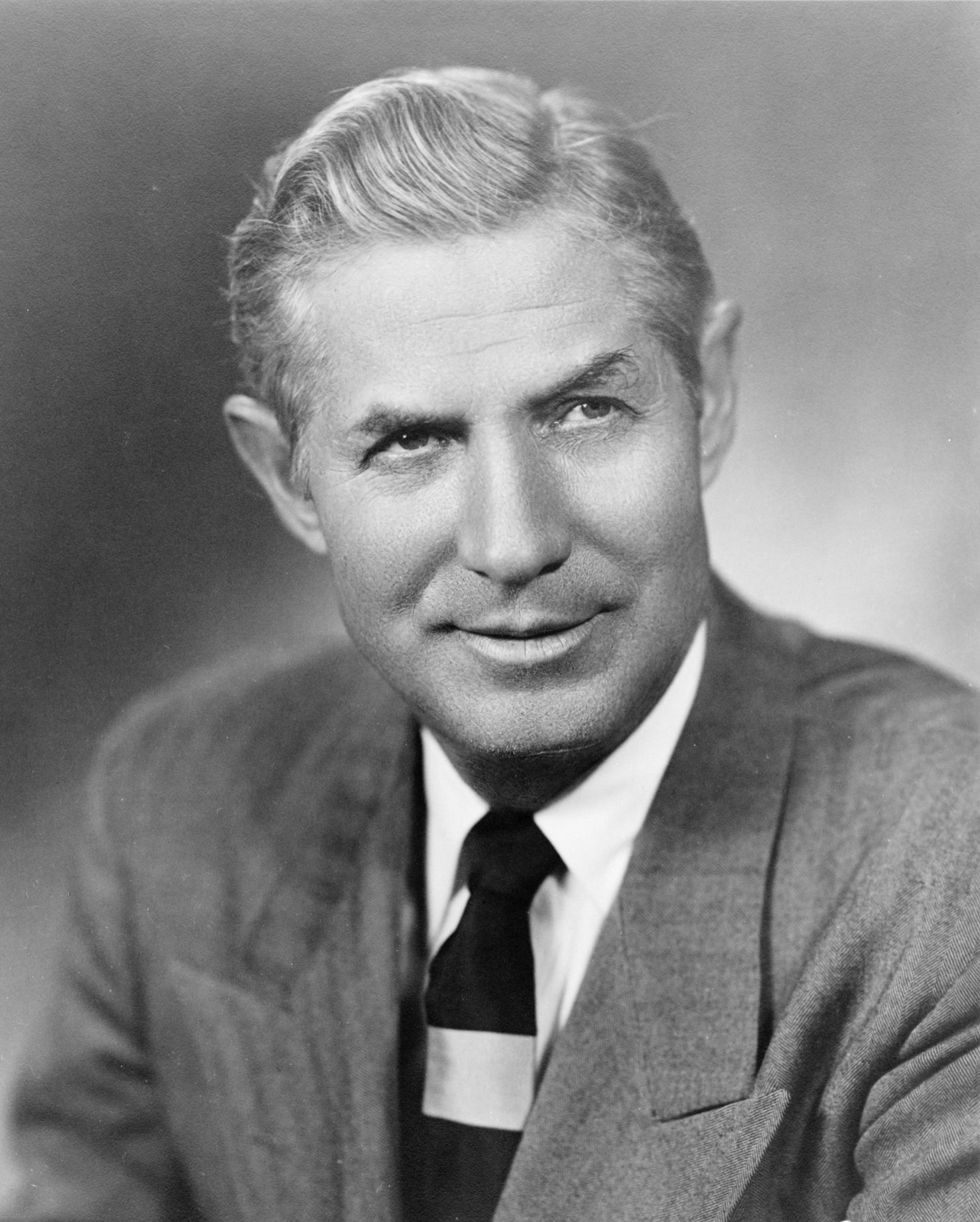

Nominee	Mike Monroney	Bill Alexander
Party	Democratic	Republican
Popular vote	345,953	285,224
Percentage	54.81%	45.19%
- County results Monroney: 50–60% 60–70% 70–80% 80–90% Alexander: 50–60% 60–70%
U.S. senator before election
Elmer Thomas
Democratic
Elected U.S. Senator
Mike Monroney
Democratic

Oklahoma election
Party	Candidate	Votes	%
Democratic	Mike Monroney	345,953	54.81%
Republican	W. H. ‘Bill’ Alexander	285,224	45.19%
Majority		60,729	8.62%
Turnout		631,177	
Democratic hold			

== Oregon ==
1950 United States Senate election in Oregon
- November 7, 1950
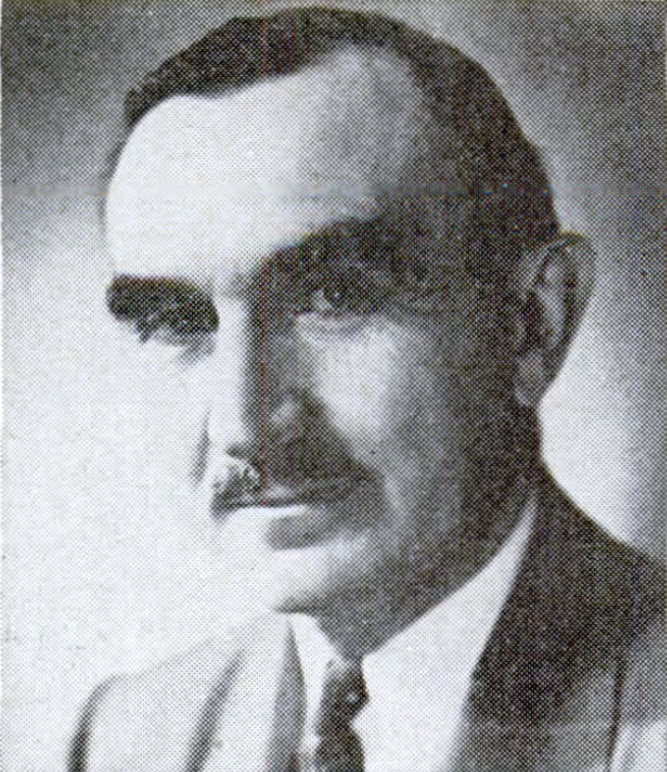

Nominee	Wayne Morse	Howard LaTourette
Party	Republican	Democratic
Popular vote	376,510	116,780
Percentage	74.79%	23.20%
- County results Morse: 60–70% 70–80% 80–90%
U.S. senator before election
Wayne Morse
Republican
Elected U.S. Senator
Wayne Morse
Republican

Oregon election
Party	Candidate	Votes	%
Republican	Wayne Morse (incumbent)	376,510	74.79%
Democratic	Howard LaTourette	116,780	23.20%
Progressive	Harlin Talbert	10,165	2.02%
Majority		259,730	51.59%
Turnout		503,455	
Republican hold			

== Pennsylvania ==
1950 United States Senate election in Pennsylvania
- November 7, 1950
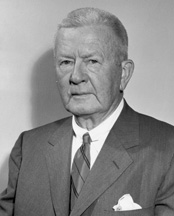

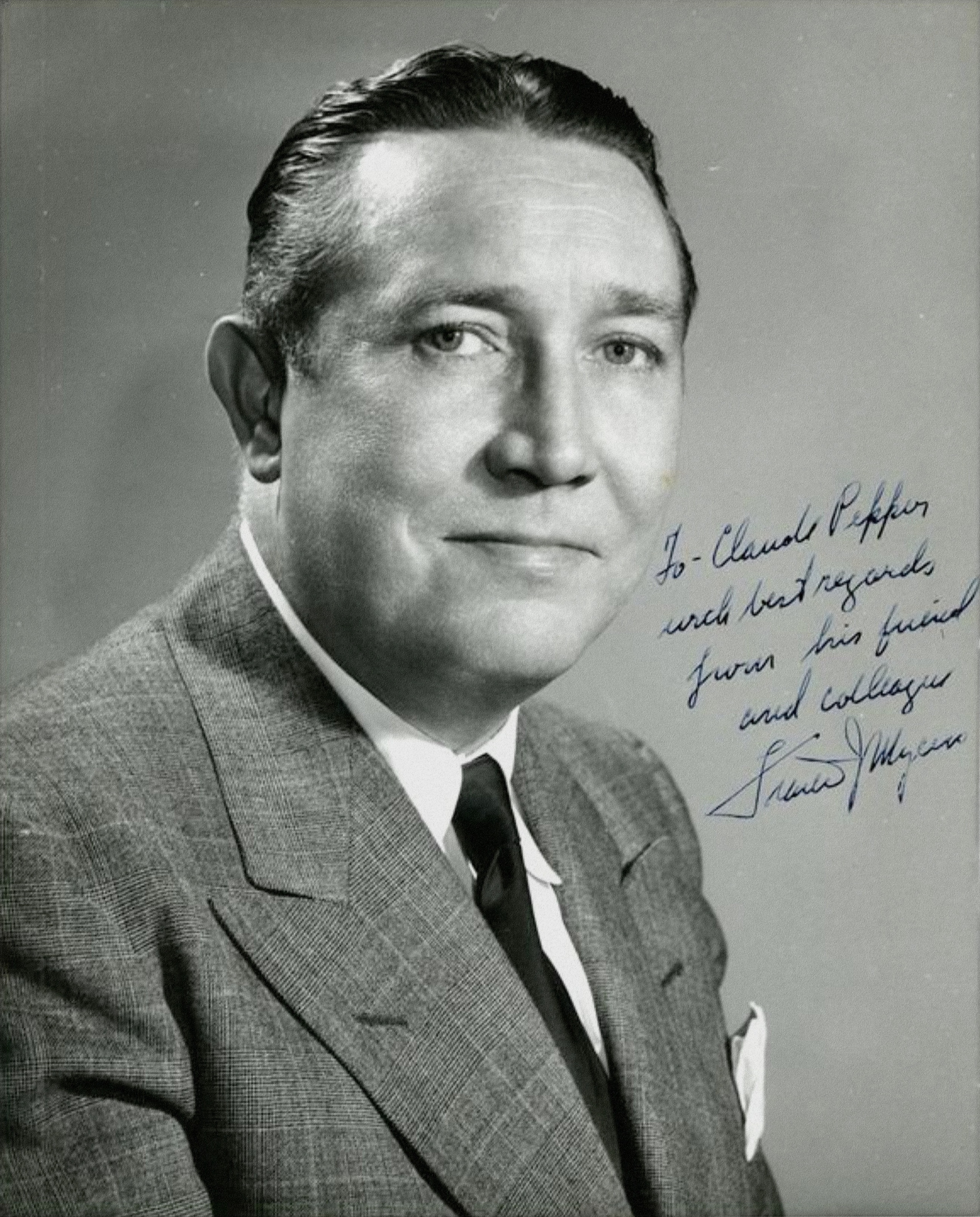
Nominee	James H. Duff	Francis J. Myers
Party	Republican	Democratic
Popular vote	1,820,400	1,694,076
Percentage	51.30%	47.74%
- County results Duff: 50–60% 60–70% 70–80% Myers: 40–50% 50–60% 60–70%
U.S. senator before election
Francis J. Myers
Democratic
Elected U.S. Senator
James H. Duff
Republican

Pennsylvania election
Party	Candidate	Votes	%
Republican	James H. Duff	1,820,400	51.30%
Democratic	Francis J. Myers (incumbent)	1,694,076	47.74%
Prohibition	Earl N. Bergerstock	12,618	0.36%
G.I.’s Against Communism	Jack Sill	8,353	0.24%
Progressive	Lillian R. Narins	5,516	0.16%
Socialist	William J. Van Essen	4,864	0.14%
Industrial Government	Frank Knotek	1,596	0.04%
Militant Workers	Clyde A. Turner	1,219	0.03%
Majority		126,324	3.56%
Turnout		3,548,642	
Republican gain from Democratic			

== Rhode Island (special) ==
1950 United States Senate special election in Rhode Island
- November 7, 1950
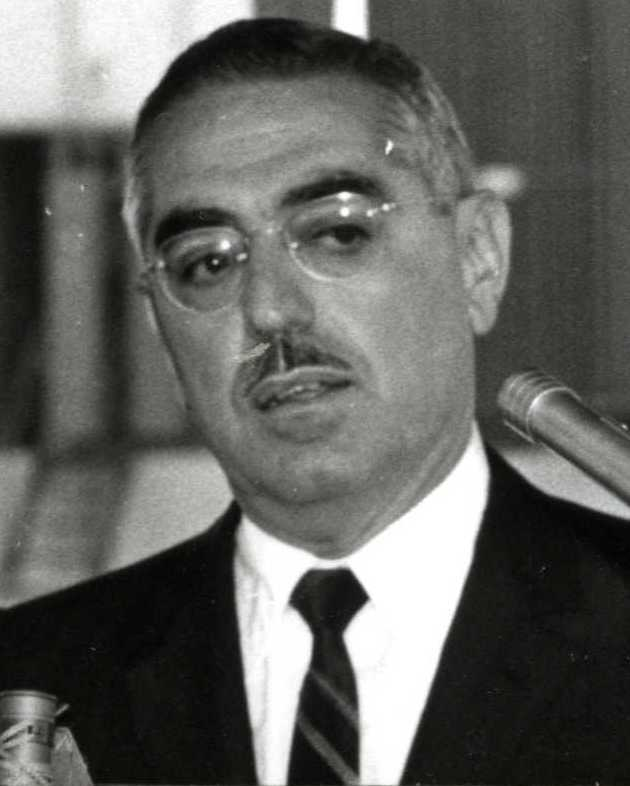

Nominee	John Pastore	Austin T. Levy
Party	Democratic	Republican
Popular vote	184,520	114,890
Percentage	61.63%	38.37%
- Pastore: 50–60% 60–70% 70–80% Levy: 50–60% 60–70% 70–80%
U.S. senator before election
John Pastore
Democratic
Elected U.S. Senator
John Pastore
Democratic

Rhode Island special election
Party	Candidate	Votes	%
Democratic	John O. Pastore	184,520	61.63%
Republican	Austin T. Levy	114,890	38.37%
Majority		69,630	23.26%
Turnout		299,410	
Democratic hold			

== South Carolina ==
1950 Democratic Senate primary election in South Carolina
- July 11, 1950
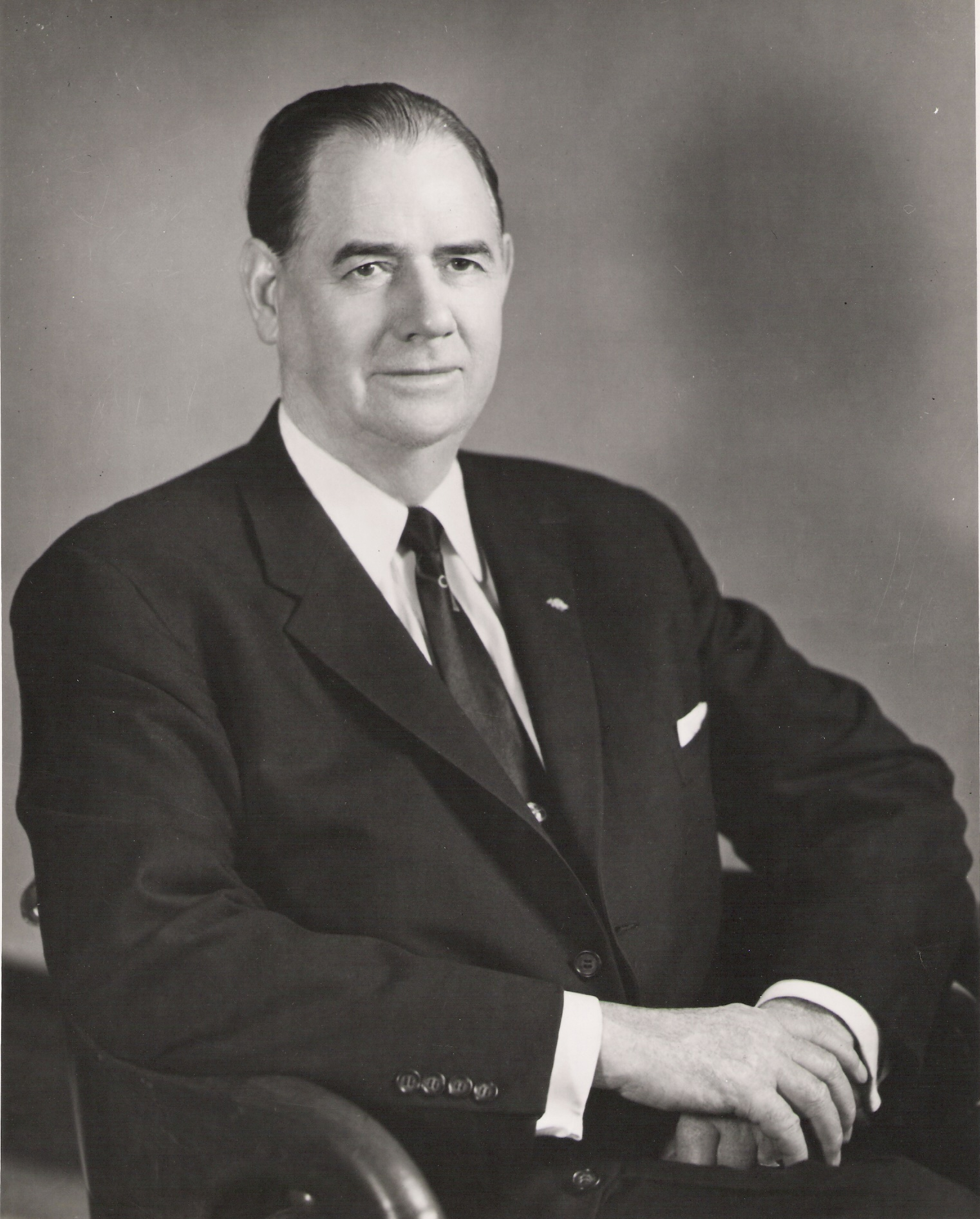

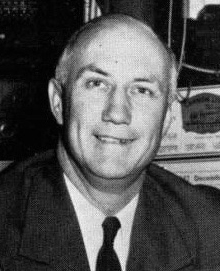
Nominee	Olin D. Johnston	Strom Thurmond
Party	Democratic	Democratic
Popular vote	186,180	158,904
Percentage	53.95%	46.05%
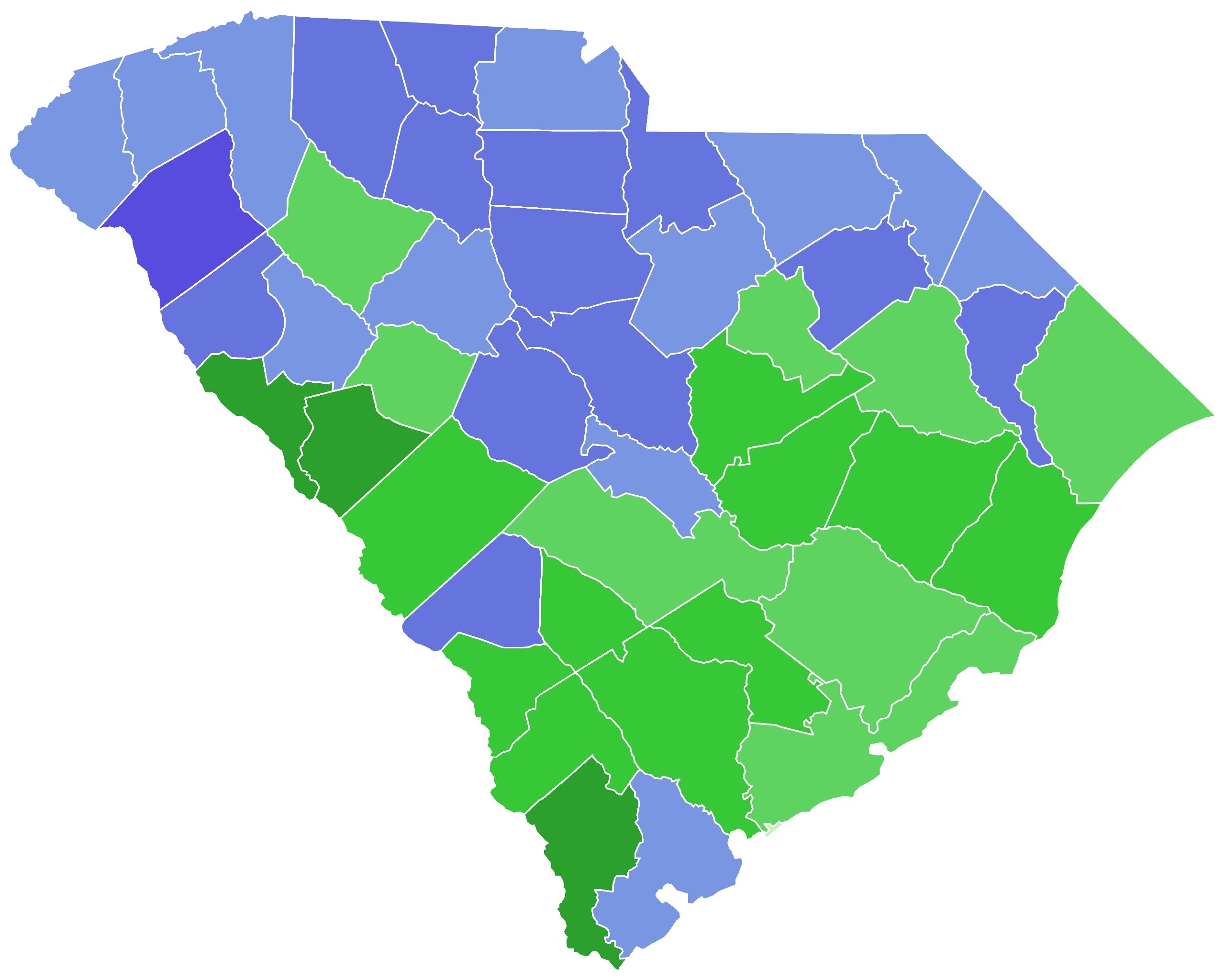
- County results Johnston: 50–60% 60–70% 70–80% Thurmond: 50–60% 60–70% 70–80%
U.S. senator before election
Olin D. Johnston
Democratic
Elected U.S. Senator
Olin D. Johnston
Democratic

South Carolina Democratic primary election
Party	Candidate	Votes	%
Democratic	Olin D. Johnston (incumbent)	186,180	54.0%
Democratic	Strom Thurmond	158,904	46.0%

South Carolina election
Party	Candidate	Votes	%
Democratic	Olin D. Johnston (incumbent)	50,458	100.00%
Democratic hold			

== South Dakota ==
1950 United States Senate election in South Dakota
- November 7, 1950
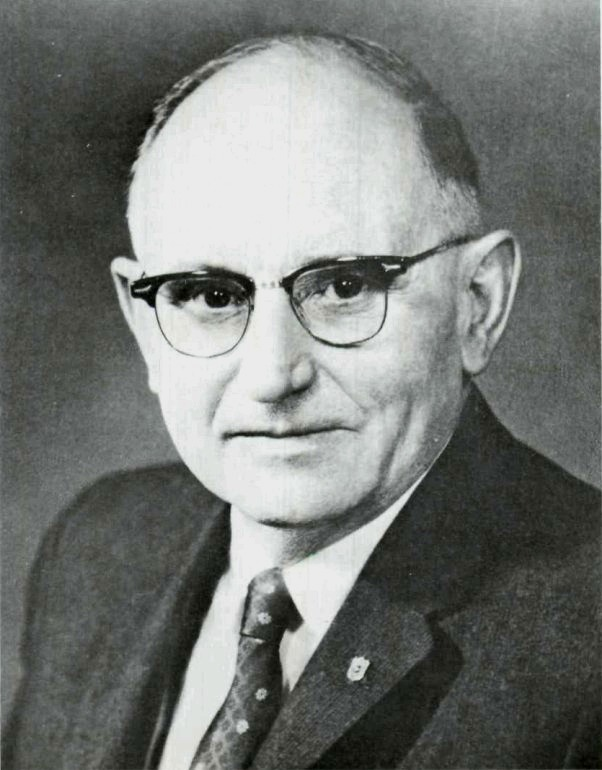

Nominee	Francis H. Case	John A. Engel
Party	Republican	Democratic
Popular vote	160,670	90,692
Percentage	63.92%	36.08%
- County results Case: 50–60% 60–70% 70–80% 80–90% Engel: 50–60% 70–80%
U.S. senator before election
Chan Gurney
Republican
Elected U.S. Senator
Francis H. Case
Republican

South Dakota election
Party	Candidate	Votes	%
Republican	Francis Case	160,670	63.92%
Democratic	John A. Engel	90,692	36.08%
Majority		69,978	27.84%
Turnout		251,362	
Republican hold			

== Utah ==
1950 United States Senate election in Utah
- November 7, 1950
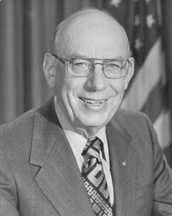

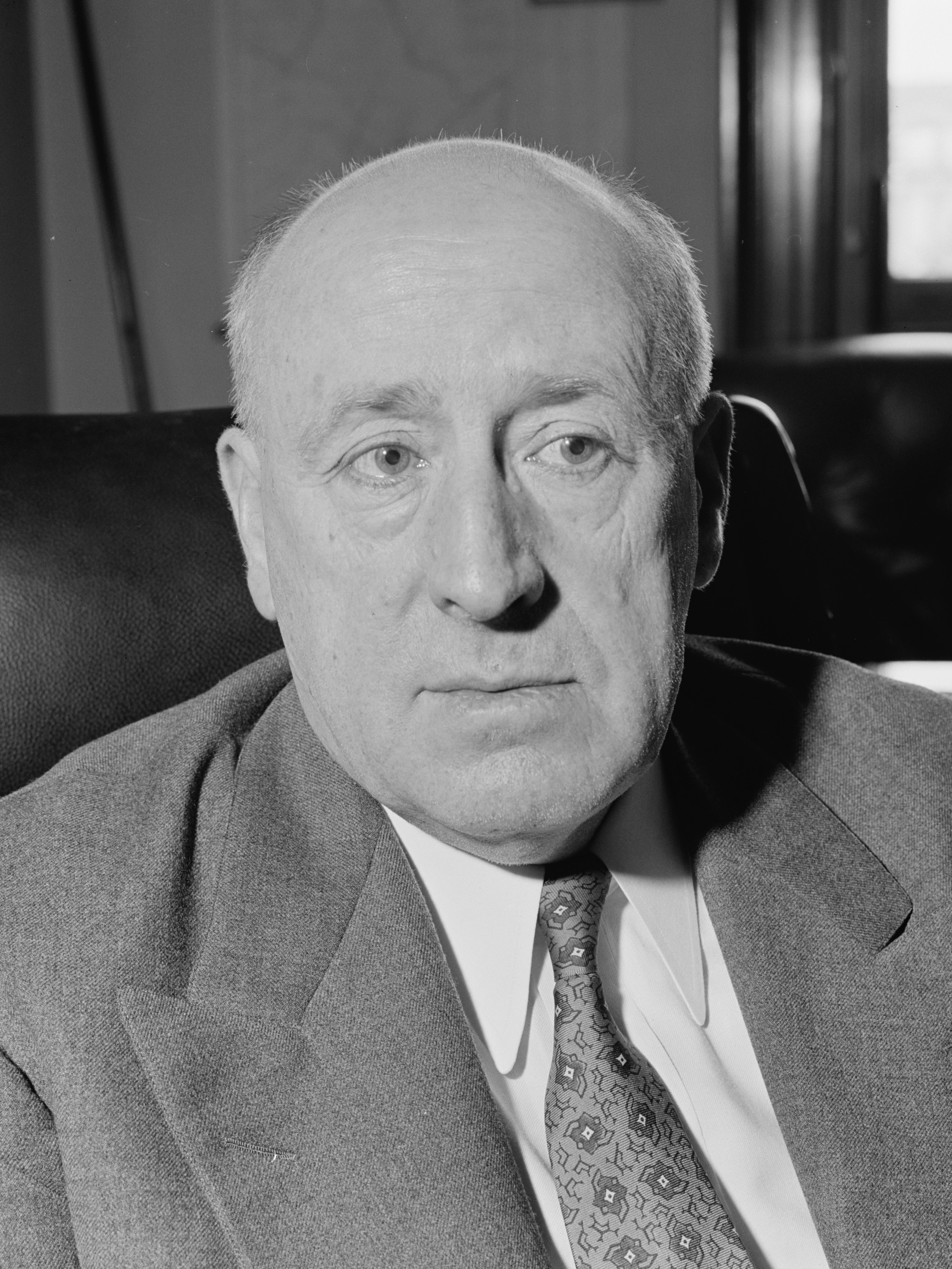
Nominee	Wallace F. Bennett	Elbert D. Thomas
Party	Republican	Democratic
Popular vote	142,427	121,198
Percentage	53.86%	45.83%
- County results Bennett: 40–50% 50–60% 60–70% 70–80% Thomas: 50–60% 60–70%
U.S. senator before election
Elbert D. Thomas
Democratic
Elected U.S. Senator
Wallace F. Bennett
Republican

Utah election
Party	Candidate	Votes	%
Republican	Wallace F. Bennett	142,427	53.86%
Democratic	Elbert D. Thomas (incumbent)	121,198	45.83%
Independent	Bill Baker	815	0.31%
Majority		21,229	8.03%
Turnout		264,440	
Republican gain from Democratic			

== Vermont ==
Vermont election
- November 7, 1950
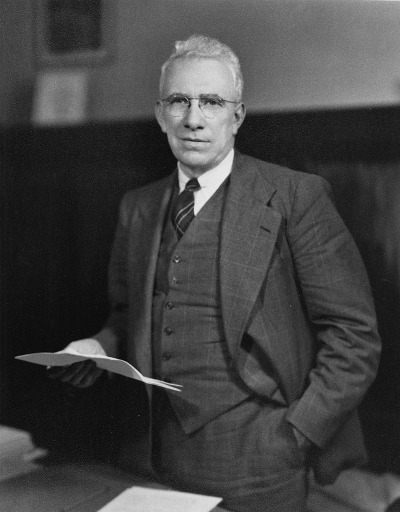

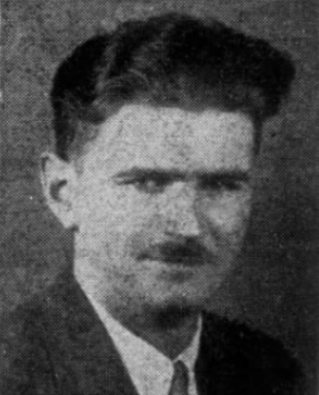
Nominee	George Aiken	James Bigelow
Party	Republican	Democratic
Popular vote	69,543	19,608
Percentage	78.0%	22.0%
- Municipal results Aiken: 50–60% 60–70% 70–80% 80–90% >90% Bigelow: 50–60% 60–70% No vote No data
U.S. senator before election
George Aiken
Republican
Elected U.S. Senator
George Aiken
Republican

Vermont election
Party	Candidate	Votes	%
Republican	George Aiken (incumbent)	69,543	77.99%
Democratic	James E. Bigelow	19,608	21.99%
None	Scattering	20	0.02%
Majority		49,935	56.00%
Turnout		89,171	
Republican hold			

== Washington ==
1950 United States Senate election in Washington
- November 7, 1950
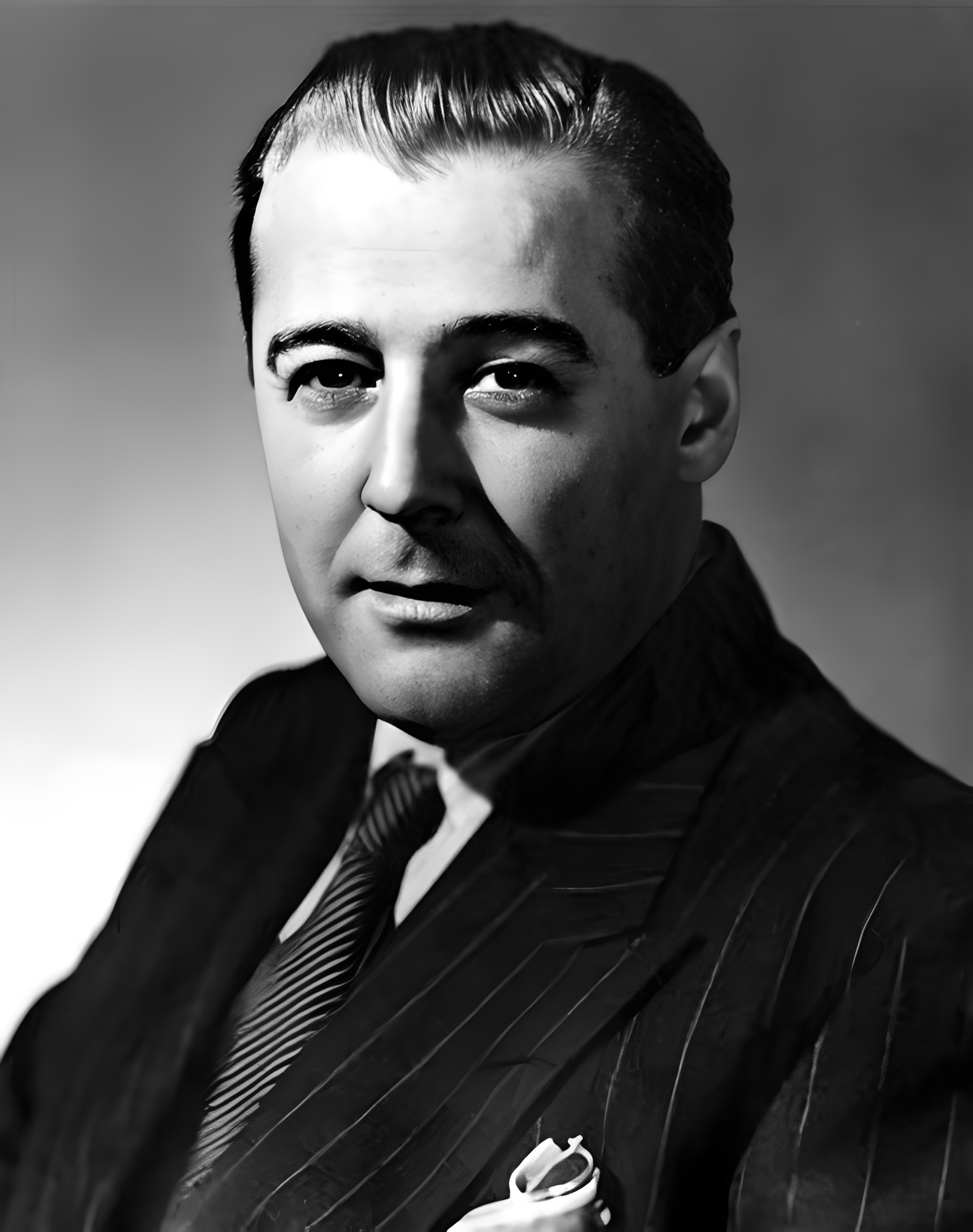

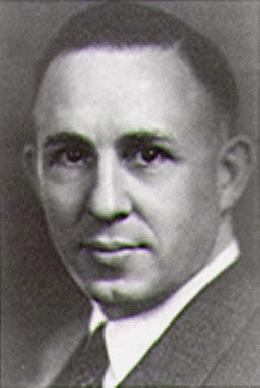
Nominee	Warren Magnuson	W. Walter Williams
Party	Democratic	Republican
Popular vote	397,719	342,464
Percentage	53.40%	45.98%
- County results Magnuson: 50–60% 60–70% Williams: 50–60% 60–70%
U.S. senator before election
Warren Magnuson
Democratic
Elected U.S. Senator
Warren Magnuson
Democratic

Washington election
Party	Candidate	Votes	%
Democratic	Warren G. Magnuson (incumbent)	397,719	53.40%
Republican	Walter Williams	342,464	45.98%
Independent	Herbert J. Phillips	3,120	0.42%
Socialist Labor	H. J. Churchward	1,480	0.20%
Majority		55,255	7.42%
Turnout		744,783	
Democratic hold			

== Wisconsin ==
1950 United States Senate election in Wisconsin
- November 7, 1950
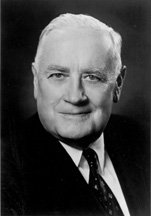

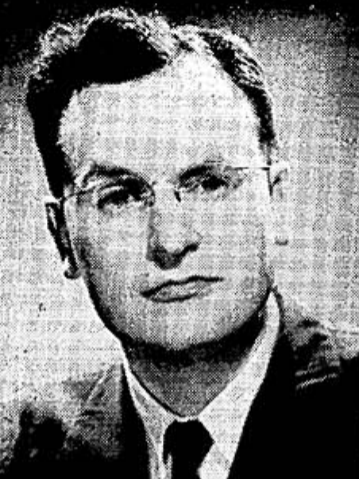
Nominee	Alexander Wiley	Thomas E. Fairchild
Party	Republican	Democratic
Popular vote	595,283	515,539
Percentage	53.34%	46.19%
- County results Wiley: 50–60% 60–70% 70–80% Fairchild: 50–60% 60–70%
U.S. senator before election
Alexander Wiley
Republican
Elected U.S. Senator
Alexander Wiley
Republican

Wisconsin election
Party	Candidate	Votes	%
Republican	Alexander Wiley (incumbent)	595,283	53.33%
Democratic	Thomas E. Fairchild	515,539	46.19%
Socialist	Edwin Knappe	3,972	0.36%
Independent	Perry J. Stearns	644	0.06%
Independent	James E. Boulton	332	0.03%
Independent	Artemio Cozzini	307	0.03%
None	Scattering	58	0.01%
Majority		79,744	7.14%
Turnout		1,116,135	
Republican hold			

== See also ==
- 1950 United States elections
  - 1950 United States House of Representatives elections
- 81st United States Congress
- 82nd United States Congress
