= 1950 United States Senate special election in Connecticut =

- November 7, 1950
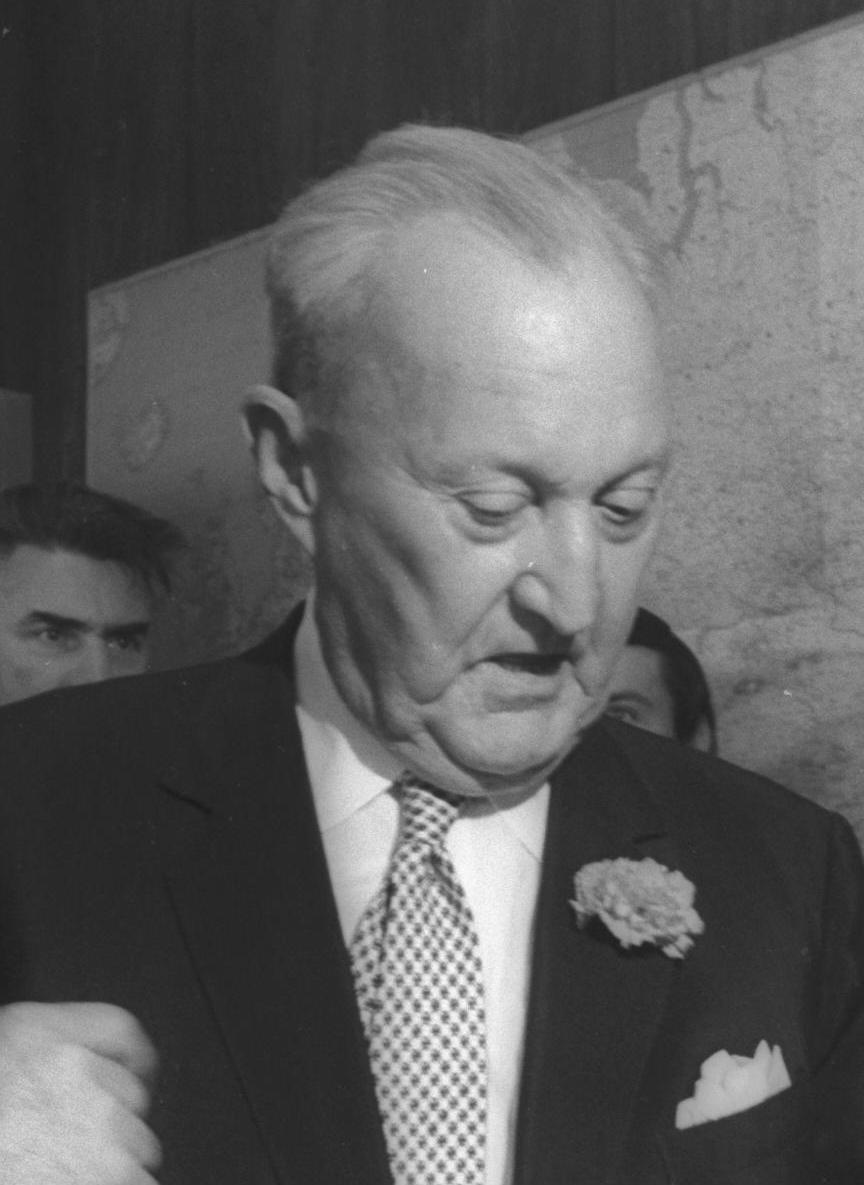

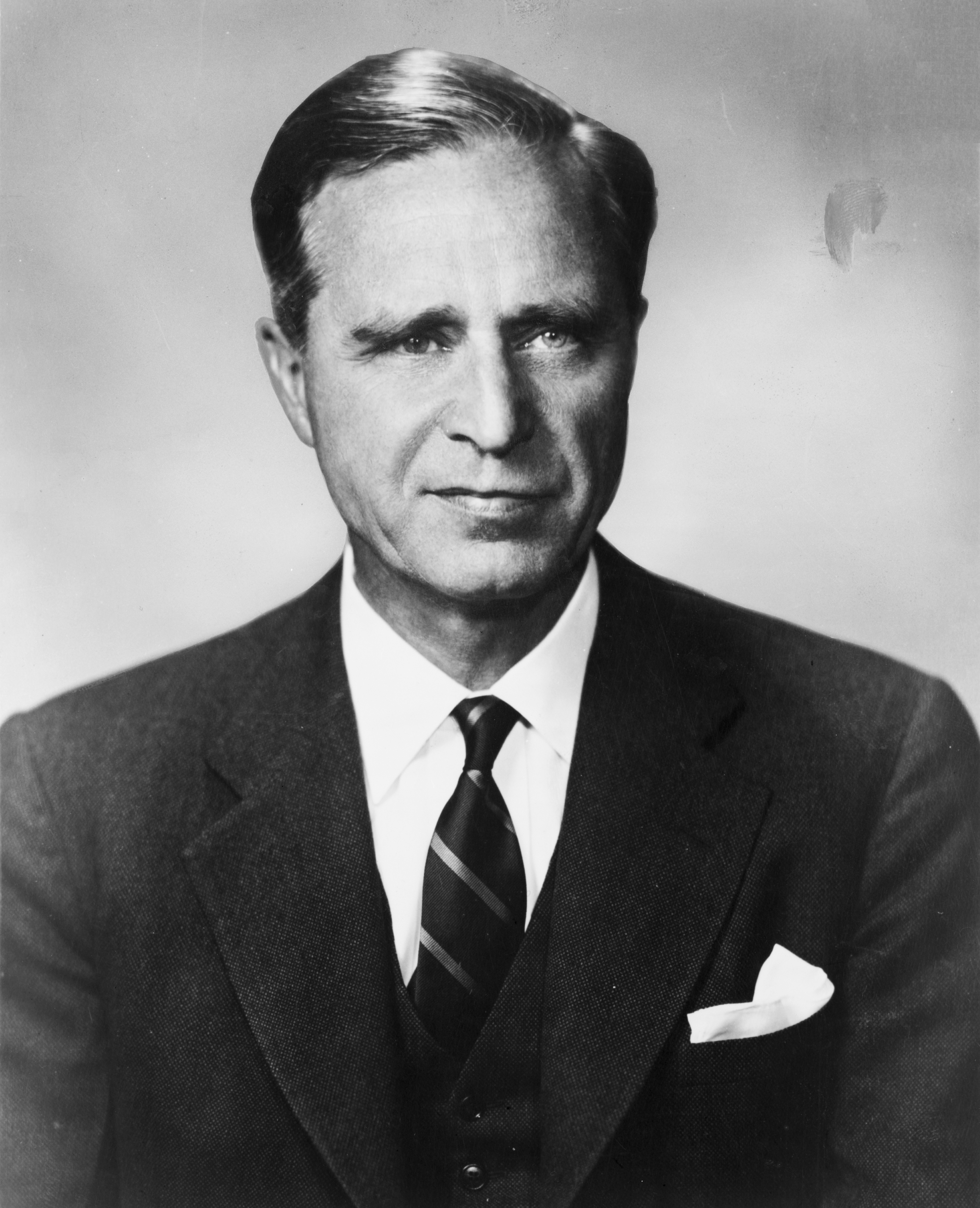
| Nominee | William Benton | Prescott Bush |
| Party | Democratic | Republican |
| Popular vote | 431,413 | 430,311 |
| Percentage | 49.18% | 49.06% |
- Benton: 40–50% 50–60% 60–70% Bush: 50–60% 60–70% 70–80% 80–90% Tie: 50%
U.S. senator before election
William Benton
Democratic
Elected U.S. Senator
William Benton
Democratic

The 1950 United States Senate special election in Connecticut took place on November 7, 1950 in Connecticut, as part of the 1950 Senate elections. The incumbent Republican Senator Raymond E. Baldwin resigned on December 16, 1949, to accept appointment to the Connecticut Supreme Court of Errors. William Benton, the former Assistant Secretary of State for Public Affairs, was appointed to the vacant seat. Benton defeated Prescott Bush in the special election by a margin of 1,102 votes, the closest Senate election of that year. In the concurrent regular election, Brien McMahon won re-election by a margin of 5.1%. Benton would go on to lose election to a full term in the 1952 regular election, while Bush would be elected to the other seat in the special election.

== Democratic nomination ==
The Democratic Party held a convention between July 28 and 29. Benton defeated former governor Charles Wilbert Snow for the nomination.

== General election ==
=== Candidates ===
- William Benton, incumbent Senator since 1949 (Democratic)
- Prescott Bush, businessman (Republican)
- John J. Gillespie (Socialist)

=== Results ===
1950 United States Senate election in Connecticut
| Party | Candidate | Votes | % | ±% |
|---|---|---|---|---|
| Democratic | William Benton (incumbent) | 431,413 | 49.18 | +8.70 |
| Republican | Prescott Bush | 430,311 | 49.06 | −6.78 |
| Socialist | John J. Gillespie | 15,441 | 1.76 | −1.46 |
| Majority | | 1,102 | 0.13 | |
| Turnout | | 877,165 | | |
| Democratic hold | | Swing | | |
