= 1952 United States Senate special election in Connecticut =

- November 4, 1952
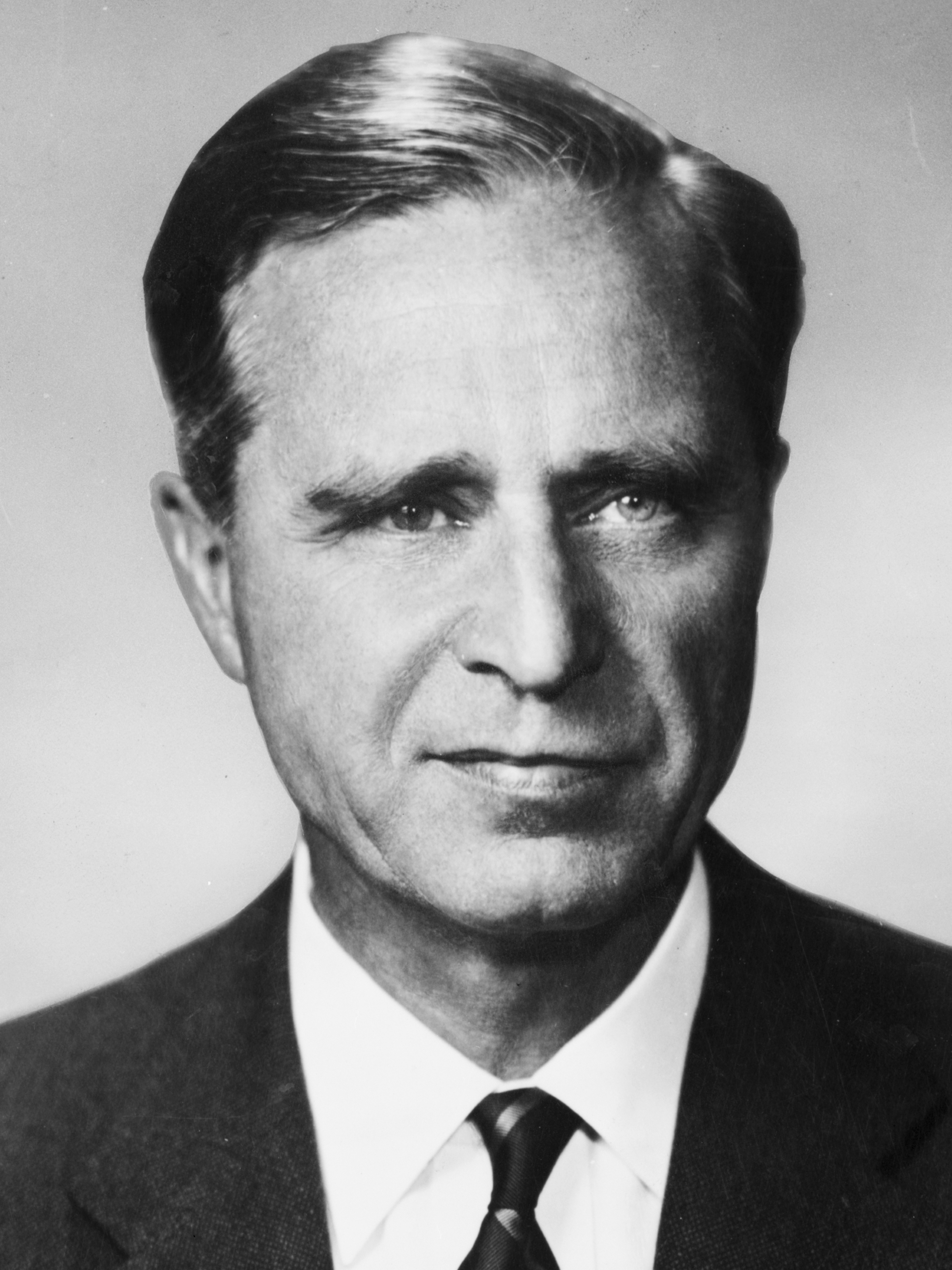

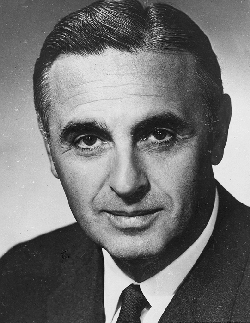
Nominee	Prescott Bush	Abraham Ribicoff
Party	Republican	Democratic
Popular vote	559,465	530,505
Percentage	51.17%	48.52%
- Bush: 50–60% 60–70% 70–80% 80–90% Ribicoff: 50–60% 60–70%
U.S. senator before election
William A. Purtell
Republican
Elected U.S. Senator
Prescott Bush
Republican

The 1952 United States Senate special election in Connecticut was held on November 4, 1952, to fill the vacancy left by the death of Brien McMahon.

Republican candidate Prescott Bush defeated Democrat Abraham Ribicoff and served the remainder of the Senate term. Bush was later re-elected in 1956 to a full term in office over Democratic U.S. Representative Thomas J. Dodd. Ribicoff would later succeed Bush in the Senate after his retirement in 1962.

== Background ==
Senator Brien McMahon, whose term in office was scheduled to expire in 1957, died on July 28, 1952. William A. Purtell, who was already the Republican nominee for Connecticut's other Senate seat in a regularly scheduled election for the term expiring in 1959, was appointed to fill the seat until a successor could be duly elected. Purtell continued to stand in the regular election rather than run for the remainder of McMahon's term.

== General election ==
=== Candidates ===
- Prescott Bush, banker and candidate for U.S. Senate in the 1950 special election (Republican)
- Abraham Ribicoff, U.S. Representative from Hartford (Democratic)
- William J. Taft (Socialist)

=== Results ===
1952 U.S. Senate special election in Connecticut
Party	Candidate	Votes	%
Republican	Prescott Bush	559,465	51.17%
Democratic	Abraham A. Ribicoff	530,505	48.52%
Socialist	William J. Taft	3,298	0.30%
Total votes		1,093,268	100.0%
Republican hold			

== See also ==
- 1952 United States Senate elections
