= 1952 United States Senate election in Connecticut =

- November 4, 1952
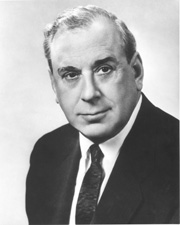

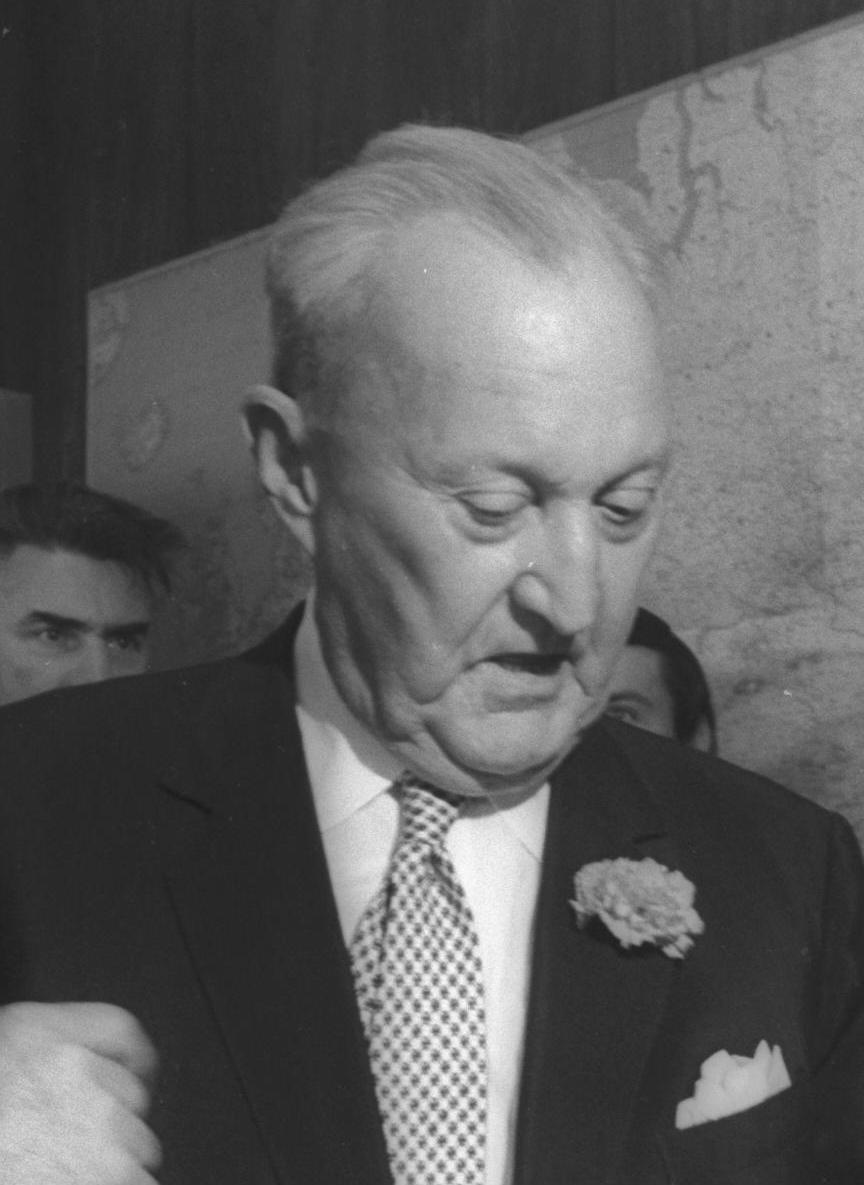
Nominee	William A. Purtell	William Benton
Party	Republican	Democratic
Popular vote	573,854	485,066
Percentage	52.48%	44.36%
- Purtell: 40–50% 50–60% 60–70% 70–80% 80–90% Benton: 40–50% 50–60% 60–70%
U.S. senator before election
William Benton
Democratic
Elected U.S. Senator
William A. Purtell
Republican

The 1952 United States Senate election in Connecticut was held on November 4, 1952. Incumbent Democratic Senator William Benton, who won a special election to complete the term of retiring Senator Raymond Baldwin, was defeated by Republican William A. Purtell after serving only 2 years.

== General election ==
=== Candidates ===
- William Benton, incumbent senator since 1949 (Democratic)
- Vivien Kellems, industrialist, inventor, and tax protester (Independent Republican)
- Jasper McLevy, Mayor of Bridgeport and perennial candidate for statewide office (Socialist)
- William A. Purtell, businessman and candidate for governor in 1950 (Note: As of August 29, 1952, Purtell was actually serving as Connecticut's interim Class III Senator after the death of Senator Brien McMahon. Governor John Davis Lodge appointed Purtell to succeed McMahon, but Purtell was not a candidate in the special election to succeed McMahon, which was held the same day and won by Prescott Bush.)

=== Campaign ===
During the campaign, Brien McMahon, the Class III Senator from Connecticut, died. Governor John Davis Lodge appointed Purtell, already the Republican nominee for this Class I seat, to serve as interim Senator in McMahon's place until a special election could be held. (Note: The special election to succeed Purtell in the other seat was held the same day and won by Prescott Bush.)

Purtell supported General Dwight D. Eisenhower's campaign platform against "communism, corruption, and Korea." Benton accused Purtell of being so conservative that he "makes Bob Taft look like a left-wing New Dealer."

=== Results ===
United States Senate election in Connecticut, 1952
Party	Candidate	Votes	%	±%
Republican	William A. Purtell	573,854	52.48%	▲3.42
Democratic	William Benton (incumbent)	485,066	44.36%	▼4.82
Independent	Vivien Kellems	22,268	2.04%	N/A
Socialist	Jasper McLevy	12,279	1.12%	▼0.64
Total votes		1,207,947	100.00%	
Republican gain from Democratic				
