= Mary Lathrop Benton =

Syrian-born American educator (1864–1955)

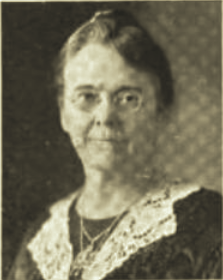
- Benton in a 1924 publication.
- Born: February 26, 1864; Bhamdoun, Mount Lebanon, Lebanon
- Died: August 12, 1955 (aged 91); Berkeley, California, U.S.
- Citizenship: U.S.
- Occupations: Professor; Dean of Women
- Parent(s): Rev. William Austin Benton & Mrs. Loanza Goulding Benton, missionaries
- Relatives: William Benton (nephew)

Academic background
- Education: University of Minnesota (A.B., 1885)
- Alma mater: Smith College (Honorary Doctor of Humanities, 1914)

Academic work
- Institutions: Mills College; Smith College; Carleton College

Mary Lathrop Benton (1864–1955) was a Lebanese-born American professor of Latin and French at Smith College. She also served as Dean of Women at Carleton College.

== Early life and education ==
Mary Lathrop Benton was born in Bhamdoun, Mount Lebanon, Syria (now part of Lebanon), February 26, 1864. Her parents, Rev. William Austin Benton and Mrs. Loanza Goulding Benton, were missionaries of the Congregational Church. She was brought to the U.S. in 1869, spending her childhood in Boston and Cambridge, Massachusetts.

Benton received an A.B. degree at the University of Minnesota in 1885 (Phi Beta Kappa). For two and half years, she also studied in the French Normal Schools of Nîmes, Blois, and Angoulême, 1895–97. She studied in Rome and traveled abroad in 1907–08. In 1914, she received an Honorary Doctor of Humanities from Smith College.

== Career ==
She was a teacher at Mills College from August 1893 till December 1894. While a student in the French Normal Schools of Nîmes, Blois, and Angoulême, she also taught there, from December 1894 to June 1897. She held positions of instructor, associate professor, and professor in Latin at Smith College from 1897 to 1914.

During the period of September 1914–21, Benton served as Dean of Women at Carleton College. From 1921 through 1925, at Carleton College, she was served as Assistant to the president and professor of French.

A delegate to France during World War I under the auspices of the American Association of Colleges and Universities (June 1918 – August 1919), Benton served as the chair of the committee in France for the selection of French girls who came on scholarships to U.S. institutions. In March 1919, Benton went to Kaunas, Lithuania on YWCA work with Laura de Turczynowicz (the two first women of the Allies to cross Germany after the armistice).

She was a member of Phi Beta Kappa, League of Women Voters, American Association of University Women, and General Federation of Women's Clubs.

== Personal life ==
She resided in Syria, Massachusetts, and Minnesota, before relocating to California in 1923, living in San Francisco and in Palo Alto.

In religion, she was a Congregationalist.

Mary Lathrop Benton died in Berkeley, California on August 12, 1955.

William Benton was a nephew.
