= 1944 United States Senate election in Connecticut =

- November 7, 1944
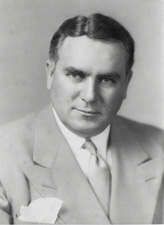

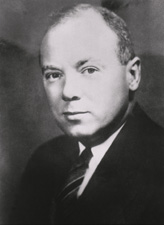
| Nominee | Brien McMahon | John A. Danaher |
| Party | Democratic | Republican |
| Popular vote | 430,716 | 391,748 |
| Percentage | 51.99% | 47.28% |
- McMahon: 50–60% 60–70% Danaher: 50–60% 60–70% 70–80% 80–90%
U.S. senator before election
John A. Danaher
Republican
Elected U.S. Senator
Brien McMahon
Democratic

The 1944 United States Senate election in Connecticut was held on November 7, 1944.

Incumbent Republican Senator John A. Danaher ran for re-election to a second term in office but was defeated by Democratic attorney Brien McMahon.

== Republican nomination ==
=== Candidates ===
- John A. Danaher, incumbent Senator since 1939

=== Convention ===
Senator Danaher was re-nominated by acclamation at the August 8 convention in Hartford. In his acceptance speech, he accused President Roosevelt of attempting to institute "one-man government."

== Democratic nomination ==
=== Candidates ===
==== Nominee ====
- Brien McMahon, attorney and former assistant to U.S. Attorney General Homer Cummings

==== Withdrew ====
- Chase G. Woodhouse, former Connecticut Secretary of State (1941-1943)
- Odell Shepard, former Lieutenant Governor of Connecticut (1941–1943)

==== Declined ====
- Thomas J. Spellacy, former Mayor of Hartford (1935-1943) (endorsed Shepard)

=== Convention ===
McMahon was nominated by acclamation at the August 5 convention in Hartford.

== General election ==
=== Candidates ===
- Spencer Anderson (Socialist)
- Brien McMahon, attorney and former assistant to U.S. Attorney General Homer Cummings (Democratic)
- John A. Danaher, incumbent Senator since 1939 (Republican)

=== Results ===
1944 U.S. Senate election in Connecticut
| Party | Candidate | Votes | % | ±% |
|---|---|---|---|---|
| Democratic | Brien McMahon | 430,716 | 51.99% | ▲11.95 |
| Republican | John A. Danaher (incumbent) | 391,748 | 47.28% | ▲4.39 |
| Socialist | Anthony R. Martino | 6,033 | 0.73% | ▼15.02 |
| Total votes | | 828,497 | 100.0% | |
| Democratic gain from Republican | | Swing | | |

== See also ==
- 1944 United States Senate elections
