= List of United States senators from Connecticut =

Current delegation

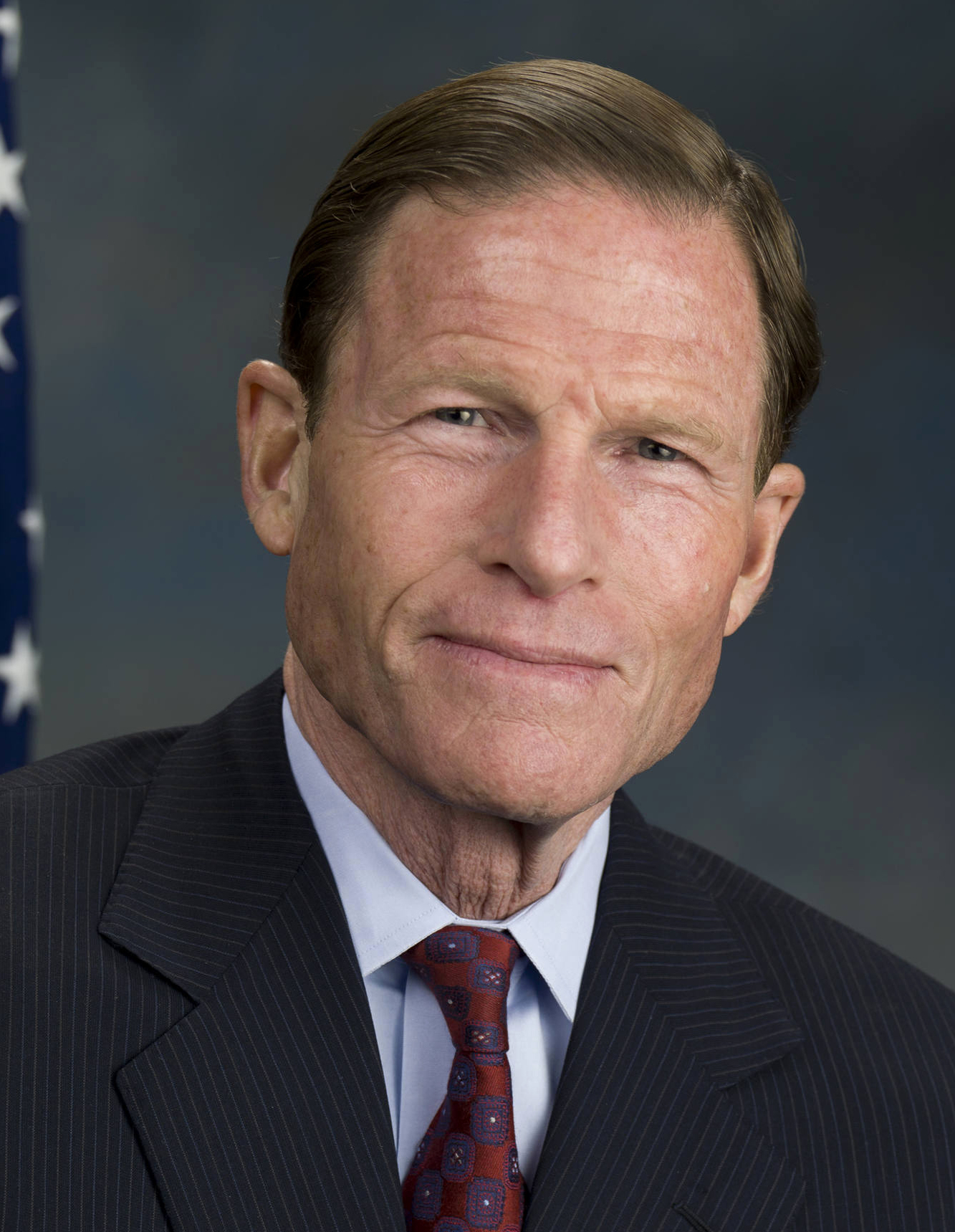
Richard Blumenthal (D)

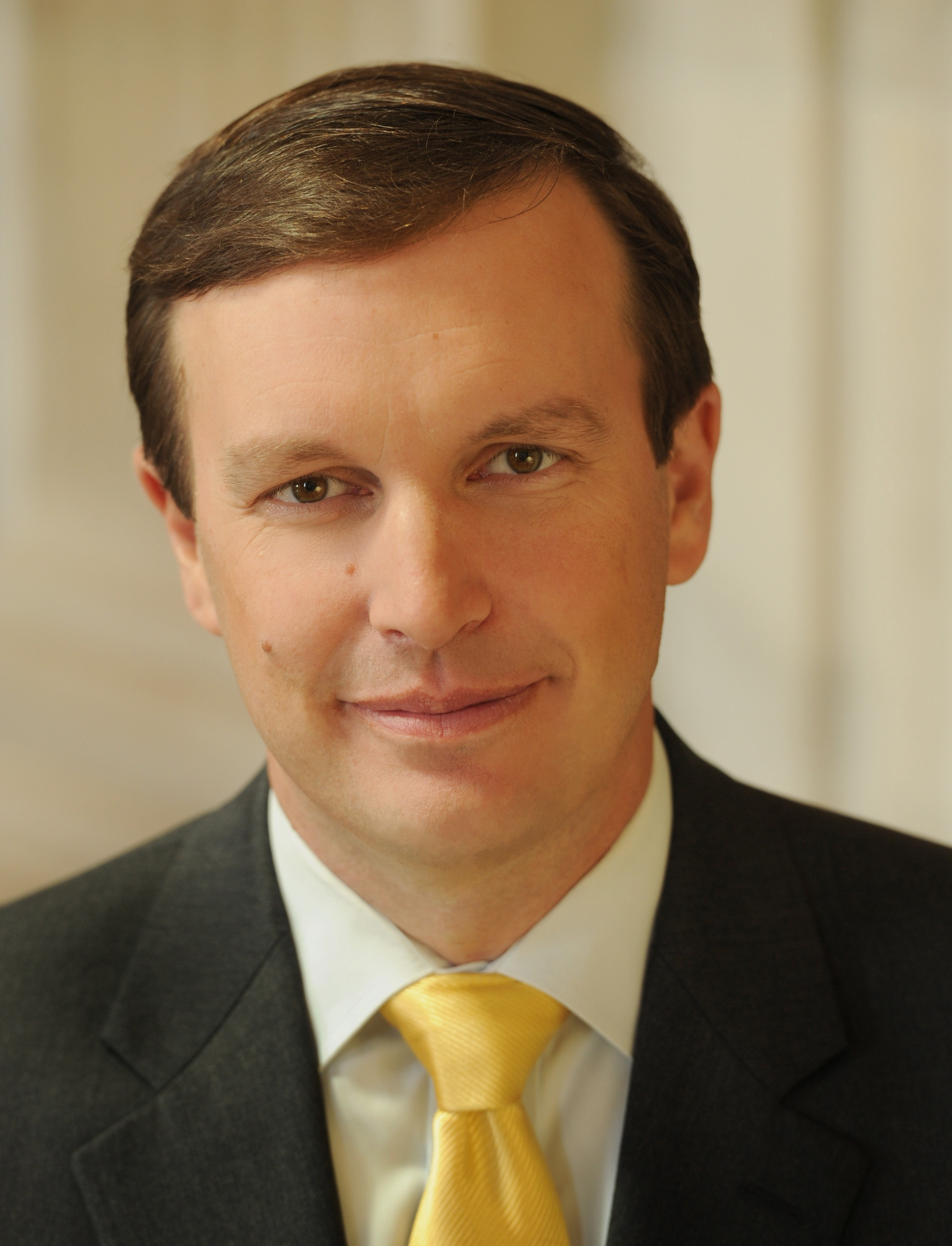
Chris Murphy (D)

(ordered by seniority)

This is a chronological listing of the United States senators from Connecticut.

United States senators are popularly elected, for a six-year term, beginning January 3. Elections are held the first Tuesday after November 1. Before 1914, they were chosen by the Connecticut General Assembly, and before 1935, their terms began March 4. Its current U.S. senators are Democrats Richard Blumenthal (serving since 2011) and Chris Murphy (serving since 2013). Chris Dodd is Connecticut's longest-serving senator (1981–2011).

== List of senators ==
Class 1 Class 1 senators belong to the electoral cycle that most recently had regular elections in 2006, 2012, 2018, and 2024. The next election will be in 2030.						C	Class 3 Class 3 senators belong to the electoral cycle that most recently had regular elections in 2004, 2010, 2016, and 2022. The next election will be in 2028.					
#	Senator	Party	Dates in office	Electoral history	T	C	T	Electoral history	Dates in office	Party	Senator	#
1	Oliver Ellsworth (Windsor)	Pro-Administration	Mar 4, 1789 – Mar 8, 1796	Elected in 1788.	1	1st	1	Elected in 1788. Resigned.	Mar 4, 1789 – Mar 3, 1791	Pro-Administration	William S. Johnson (Stratford)	1
1	Oliver Ellsworth (Windsor)	Pro-Administration	Mar 4, 1789 – Mar 8, 1796	Re-elected in 1791. Resigned to become Chief Justice of the United States.	2	2nd	1		Mar 4, 1791 – Jun 13, 1791	Vacant		
1	Oliver Ellsworth (Windsor)	Pro-Administration	Mar 4, 1789 – Mar 8, 1796	Re-elected in 1791. Resigned to become Chief Justice of the United States.	2	2nd	1	Elected to finish Johnson's term. Died.	Jun 13, 1791 – Jul 23, 1793	Pro-Administration	Roger Sherman (New Milford)	2
1	Oliver Ellsworth (Windsor)	Pro-Administration	Mar 4, 1789 – Mar 8, 1796	Re-elected in 1791. Resigned to become Chief Justice of the United States.	2	3rd	1	Elected to finish Johnson's term. Died.	Jun 13, 1791 – Jul 23, 1793	Pro-Administration	Roger Sherman (New Milford)	2
1	Oliver Ellsworth (Windsor)	Pro-Administration	Mar 4, 1789 – Mar 8, 1796	Re-elected in 1791. Resigned to become Chief Justice of the United States.	2	3rd	1		Jul 23, 1793 – Dec 2, 1793	Vacant		
1	Oliver Ellsworth (Windsor)	Pro-Administration	Mar 4, 1789 – Mar 8, 1796	Re-elected in 1791. Resigned to become Chief Justice of the United States.	2	3rd	1	Elected to finish Sherman's term. Retired.	Dec 2, 1793 – Mar 3, 1795	Pro-Administration	Stephen Mix Mitchell (Wethersfield)	3
1	Oliver Ellsworth (Windsor)	Federalist	Mar 4, 1789 – Mar 8, 1796	Re-elected in 1791. Resigned to become Chief Justice of the United States.	2	4th	2	Election date unknown. Resigned to become Lieutenant Governor of Connecticut.	Mar 4, 1795 – Jun 10, 1796	Federalist	Jonathan Trumbull Jr. (Lebanon)	4
Vacant			Mar 8, 1796 – May 12, 1796		2	4th	2	Election date unknown. Resigned to become Lieutenant Governor of Connecticut.	Mar 4, 1795 – Jun 10, 1796	Federalist	Jonathan Trumbull Jr. (Lebanon)	4
Vacant			Mar 8, 1796 – May 12, 1796		2	4th	2		Jun 10, 1796 – Oct 13, 1796	Vacant		
Vacant			Mar 8, 1796 – May 12, 1796		2	4th	2	Elected to finish Trumbull's term.	Oct 13, 1796 – Jul 19, 1807	Federalist	Uriah Tracy (Litchfield)	5
2	James Hillhouse (New Haven)	Federalist	May 12, 1796 – Jun 10, 1810	Elected to finish Ellsworth's term.	2	4th	2	Elected to finish Trumbull's term.	Oct 13, 1796 – Jul 19, 1807	Federalist	Uriah Tracy (Litchfield)	5
2	James Hillhouse (New Haven)	Federalist	May 12, 1796 – Jun 10, 1810	Re-elected in 1797.	3	5th	2	Elected to finish Trumbull's term.	Oct 13, 1796 – Jul 19, 1807	Federalist	Uriah Tracy (Litchfield)	5
2	James Hillhouse (New Haven)	Federalist	May 12, 1796 – Jun 10, 1810	Re-elected in 1797.	3	6th	2	Elected to finish Trumbull's term.	Oct 13, 1796 – Jul 19, 1807	Federalist	Uriah Tracy (Litchfield)	5
2	James Hillhouse (New Haven)	Federalist	May 12, 1796 – Jun 10, 1810	Re-elected in 1797.	3	7th	3	Re-elected in 1801.	Oct 13, 1796 – Jul 19, 1807	Federalist	Uriah Tracy (Litchfield)	5
2	James Hillhouse (New Haven)	Federalist	May 12, 1796 – Jun 10, 1810	Re-elected in 1802.	4	8th	3	Re-elected in 1801.	Oct 13, 1796 – Jul 19, 1807	Federalist	Uriah Tracy (Litchfield)	5
2	James Hillhouse (New Haven)	Federalist	May 12, 1796 – Jun 10, 1810	Re-elected in 1802.	4	9th	3	Re-elected in 1801.	Oct 13, 1796 – Jul 19, 1807	Federalist	Uriah Tracy (Litchfield)	5
2	James Hillhouse (New Haven)	Federalist	May 12, 1796 – Jun 10, 1810	Re-elected in 1802.	4	10th	4	Re-elected in 1807. Died.	Oct 13, 1796 – Jul 19, 1807	Federalist	Uriah Tracy (Litchfield)	5
2	James Hillhouse (New Haven)	Federalist	May 12, 1796 – Jun 10, 1810	Re-elected in 1802.	4	10th	4		Jul 19, 1807 – Oct 25, 1807	Vacant		
2	James Hillhouse (New Haven)	Federalist	May 12, 1796 – Jun 10, 1810	Re-elected in 1802.	4	10th	4	Elected to finish Tracy's term.	Oct 25, 1807 – May 13, 1813	Federalist	Chauncey Goodrich (Hartford)	6
2	James Hillhouse (New Haven)	Federalist	May 12, 1796 – Jun 10, 1810	Re-elected in 1809. Resigned.	5	11th	4	Elected to finish Tracy's term.	Oct 25, 1807 – May 13, 1813	Federalist	Chauncey Goodrich (Hartford)	6
Vacant			Jun 10, 1810 – Dec 4, 1810		5	11th	4	Elected to finish Tracy's term.	Oct 25, 1807 – May 13, 1813	Federalist	Chauncey Goodrich (Hartford)	6
3	Samuel W. Dana (Middletown)	Federalist	Dec 4, 1810 – Mar 3, 1821	Elected to finish Hillhouse's term.	5	11th	4	Elected to finish Tracy's term.	Oct 25, 1807 – May 13, 1813	Federalist	Chauncey Goodrich (Hartford)	6
3	Samuel W. Dana (Middletown)	Federalist	Dec 4, 1810 – Mar 3, 1821	Elected to finish Hillhouse's term.	5	12th	4	Elected to finish Tracy's term.	Oct 25, 1807 – May 13, 1813	Federalist	Chauncey Goodrich (Hartford)	6
3	Samuel W. Dana (Middletown)	Federalist	Dec 4, 1810 – Mar 3, 1821	Elected to finish Hillhouse's term.	5	13th	5	Re-elected in 1813. Resigned to become Lieutenant Governor of Connecticut.	Oct 25, 1807 – May 13, 1813	Federalist	Chauncey Goodrich (Hartford)	6
3	Samuel W. Dana (Middletown)	Federalist	Dec 4, 1810 – Mar 3, 1821	Elected to finish Hillhouse's term.	5	13th	5	Elected to finish Goodrich's term. Retired.	May 13, 1813 – Mar 3, 1819	Federalist	David Daggett (New Haven)	7
3	Samuel W. Dana (Middletown)	Federalist	Dec 4, 1810 – Mar 3, 1821	Re-elected in 1814.	6	14th	5	Elected to finish Goodrich's term. Retired.	May 13, 1813 – Mar 3, 1819	Federalist	David Daggett (New Haven)	7
3	Samuel W. Dana (Middletown)	Federalist	Dec 4, 1810 – Mar 3, 1821	Re-elected in 1814.	6	15th	5	Elected to finish Goodrich's term. Retired.	May 13, 1813 – Mar 3, 1819	Federalist	David Daggett (New Haven)	7
3	Samuel W. Dana (Middletown)	Federalist	Dec 4, 1810 – Mar 3, 1821	Re-elected in 1814.	6	16th	6	Elected in 1818. Appointed in 1824 after Legislature failed to elect a new Senator and presented his credentials but was not permitted to qualify.	Mar 4, 1819 – Mar 3, 1825	Democratic-Republican	James Lanman (Norwich)	8
4	Elijah Boardman (Litchfield)	Democratic-Republican	Mar 4, 1821 – Aug 18, 1823	Elected in 1821. Died.	7	17th	6	Elected in 1818. Appointed in 1824 after Legislature failed to elect a new Senator and presented his credentials but was not permitted to qualify.	Mar 4, 1819 – Mar 3, 1825	Democratic-Republican	James Lanman (Norwich)	8
4	Elijah Boardman (Litchfield)	Democratic-Republican	Mar 4, 1821 – Aug 18, 1823	Elected in 1821. Died.	7	18th	6	Elected in 1818. Appointed in 1824 after Legislature failed to elect a new Senator and presented his credentials but was not permitted to qualify.	Mar 4, 1819 – Mar 3, 1825	Democratic-Republican	James Lanman (Norwich)	8
Vacant			Aug 18, 1823 – Oct 8, 1823		7	18th	6	Elected in 1818. Appointed in 1824 after Legislature failed to elect a new Senator and presented his credentials but was not permitted to qualify.	Mar 4, 1819 – Mar 3, 1825	Democratic-Republican	James Lanman (Norwich)	8
5	Henry W. Edwards (New Haven)	Democratic-Republican	Oct 8, 1823 – Mar 3, 1827	Appointed to continue Boardman's term. Elected in 1824 to finish Boardman's term.	7	18th	6	Elected in 1818. Appointed in 1824 after Legislature failed to elect a new Senator and presented his credentials but was not permitted to qualify.	Mar 4, 1819 – Mar 3, 1825	Democratic-Republican	James Lanman (Norwich)	8
5	Henry W. Edwards (New Haven)	Jacksonian	Oct 8, 1823 – Mar 3, 1827	Appointed to continue Boardman's term. Elected in 1824 to finish Boardman's term.	7	19th	7		Mar 4, 1825 – May 4, 1825	Vacant		
5	Henry W. Edwards (New Haven)	Jacksonian	Oct 8, 1823 – Mar 3, 1827	Appointed to continue Boardman's term. Elected in 1824 to finish Boardman's term.	7	19th	7	Elected late to complete Lanman's term. [data missing]	May 4, 1825 – Mar 3, 1831	National; Republican	Calvin Willey (Tolland)	9
6	Samuel A. Foot (Cheshire)	National; Republican	Mar 4, 1827 – Mar 3, 1833	Elected in 1826. Lost re-election.	8	20th	7	Elected late to complete Lanman's term. [data missing]	May 4, 1825 – Mar 3, 1831	National; Republican	Calvin Willey (Tolland)	9
6	Samuel A. Foot (Cheshire)	National; Republican	Mar 4, 1827 – Mar 3, 1833	Elected in 1826. Lost re-election.	8	21st	7	Elected late to complete Lanman's term. [data missing]	May 4, 1825 – Mar 3, 1831	National; Republican	Calvin Willey (Tolland)	9
6	Samuel A. Foot (Cheshire)	National; Republican	Mar 4, 1827 – Mar 3, 1833	Elected in 1826. Lost re-election.	8	22nd	8	Elected in 1831. [data missing]	Mar 4, 1831 – Mar 3, 1837	National; Republican	Gideon Tomlinson (Fairfield)	10
7	Nathan Smith (New Haven)	National; Republican	Mar 4, 1833 – Dec 6, 1835	Elected in 1832. Died.	9	23rd	8	Elected in 1831. [data missing]	Mar 4, 1831 – Mar 3, 1837	National; Republican	Gideon Tomlinson (Fairfield)	10
7	Nathan Smith (New Haven)	National; Republican	Mar 4, 1833 – Dec 6, 1835	Elected in 1832. Died.	9	24th	8	Elected in 1831. [data missing]	Mar 4, 1831 – Mar 3, 1837	National; Republican	Gideon Tomlinson (Fairfield)	10
Vacant			Dec 6, 1835 – Dec 21, 1835		9	24th	8	Elected in 1831. [data missing]	Mar 4, 1831 – Mar 3, 1837	National; Republican	Gideon Tomlinson (Fairfield)	10
8	John Milton Niles (Hartford)	Jacksonian	Dec 21, 1835 – Mar 3, 1839	Elected to finish Smith's term. Retired.	9	24th	8	Elected in 1831. [data missing]	Mar 4, 1831 – Mar 3, 1837	National; Republican	Gideon Tomlinson (Fairfield)	10
8	John Milton Niles (Hartford)	Democratic	Dec 21, 1835 – Mar 3, 1839	Elected to finish Smith's term. Retired.	9	25th	9	Elected in 1837. [data missing]	Mar 4, 1837 – Mar 3, 1843	Democratic	Perry Smith (New Milford)	11
9	Thaddeus Betts (Norwalk)	Whig	Mar 4, 1839 – Apr 7, 1840	Elected in 1838 or 1839. Died.	10	26th	9	Elected in 1837. [data missing]	Mar 4, 1837 – Mar 3, 1843	Democratic	Perry Smith (New Milford)	11
Vacant			Apr 7, 1840 – May 4, 1840		10	26th	9	Elected in 1837. [data missing]	Mar 4, 1837 – Mar 3, 1843	Democratic	Perry Smith (New Milford)	11
10	Jabez W. Huntington (Norwich)	Whig	May 4, 1840 – Nov 1, 1847	Elected to finish Betts's term.	10	26th	9	Elected in 1837. [data missing]	Mar 4, 1837 – Mar 3, 1843	Democratic	Perry Smith (New Milford)	11
10	Jabez W. Huntington (Norwich)	Whig	May 4, 1840 – Nov 1, 1847	Elected to finish Betts's term.	10	27th	9	Elected in 1837. [data missing]	Mar 4, 1837 – Mar 3, 1843	Democratic	Perry Smith (New Milford)	11
10	Jabez W. Huntington (Norwich)	Whig	May 4, 1840 – Nov 1, 1847	Elected to finish Betts's term.	10	28th	10	Elected in 1842. Retired.	Mar 4, 1843 – Mar 3, 1849	Democratic	John Milton Niles (Hartford)	12
10	Jabez W. Huntington (Norwich)	Whig	May 4, 1840 – Nov 1, 1847	Re-elected in 1844 or 1845. Died.	11	29th	10	Elected in 1842. Retired.	Mar 4, 1843 – Mar 3, 1849	Democratic	John Milton Niles (Hartford)	12
10	Jabez W. Huntington (Norwich)	Whig	May 4, 1840 – Nov 1, 1847	Re-elected in 1844 or 1845. Died.	11	30th	10	Elected in 1842. Retired.	Mar 4, 1843 – Mar 3, 1849	Democratic	John Milton Niles (Hartford)	12
Vacant			Nov 1, 1847 – Nov 11, 1847		11	30th	10	Elected in 1842. Retired.	Mar 4, 1843 – Mar 3, 1849	Democratic	John Milton Niles (Hartford)	12
11	Roger Sherman Baldwin (New Haven)	Whig	Nov 11, 1847 – Mar 3, 1851	Appointed to continue Huntington's term. Elected in 1848 to finish Huntington's term. [data missing]	11	30th	10	Elected in 1842. Retired.	Mar 4, 1843 – Mar 3, 1849	Democratic	John Milton Niles (Hartford)	12
11	Roger Sherman Baldwin (New Haven)	Whig	Nov 11, 1847 – Mar 3, 1851	Appointed to continue Huntington's term. Elected in 1848 to finish Huntington's term. [data missing]	11	31st	11	Elected in 1848 or 1849. Resigned.	Mar 4, 1849 – May 24, 1854	Whig	Truman Smith (Litchfield)	13
Vacant			Mar 4, 1851 – May 12, 1852		12	32nd	11	Elected in 1848 or 1849. Resigned.	Mar 4, 1849 – May 24, 1854	Whig	Truman Smith (Litchfield)	13
12	Isaac Toucey (Hartford)	Democratic	May 12, 1852 – Mar 3, 1857	Elected late in 1852. Retired.	12	32nd	11	Elected in 1848 or 1849. Resigned.	Mar 4, 1849 – May 24, 1854	Whig	Truman Smith (Litchfield)	13
12	Isaac Toucey (Hartford)	Democratic	May 12, 1852 – Mar 3, 1857	Elected late in 1852. Retired.	12	33rd	11	Elected in 1848 or 1849. Resigned.	Mar 4, 1849 – May 24, 1854	Whig	Truman Smith (Litchfield)	13
12	Isaac Toucey (Hartford)	Democratic	May 12, 1852 – Mar 3, 1857	Elected late in 1852. Retired.	12	33rd	11	Elected to finish Smith's term. Retired.	May 24, 1854 – Mar 3, 1855	Free Soil	Francis Gillette (Hartford)	14
12	Isaac Toucey (Hartford)	Democratic	May 12, 1852 – Mar 3, 1857	Elected late in 1852. Retired.	12	34th	12	Elected in 1854.	Mar 4, 1855 – Mar 3, 1867	Republican	Lafayette S. Foster (Norwich)	15
13	James Dixon (Hartford)	Republican	Mar 4, 1857 – Mar 3, 1869	Elected in 1856.	13	35th	12	Elected in 1854.	Mar 4, 1855 – Mar 3, 1867	Republican	Lafayette S. Foster (Norwich)	15
13	James Dixon (Hartford)	Republican	Mar 4, 1857 – Mar 3, 1869	Elected in 1856.	13	36th	12	Elected in 1854.	Mar 4, 1855 – Mar 3, 1867	Republican	Lafayette S. Foster (Norwich)	15
13	James Dixon (Hartford)	Republican	Mar 4, 1857 – Mar 3, 1869	Elected in 1856.	13	37th	13	Re-elected in 1860. Lost re-election.	Mar 4, 1855 – Mar 3, 1867	Republican	Lafayette S. Foster (Norwich)	15
13	James Dixon (Hartford)	Republican	Mar 4, 1857 – Mar 3, 1869	Re-elected in 1862. Lost re-election.	14	38th	13	Re-elected in 1860. Lost re-election.	Mar 4, 1855 – Mar 3, 1867	Republican	Lafayette S. Foster (Norwich)	15
13	James Dixon (Hartford)	Republican	Mar 4, 1857 – Mar 3, 1869	Re-elected in 1862. Lost re-election.	14	39th	13	Re-elected in 1860. Lost re-election.	Mar 4, 1855 – Mar 3, 1867	Republican	Lafayette S. Foster (Norwich)	15
13	James Dixon (Hartford)	Republican	Mar 4, 1857 – Mar 3, 1869	Re-elected in 1862. Lost re-election.	14	40th	14	Elected in 1866.	Mar 4, 1867 – Nov 21, 1875	Republican	Orris S. Ferry (Norwalk)	16
14	William A. Buckingham (Norwich)	Republican	Mar 4, 1869 – Feb 5, 1875	Elected in 1868. Lost re-election and died before end of term.	15	41st	14	Elected in 1866.	Mar 4, 1867 – Nov 21, 1875	Republican	Orris S. Ferry (Norwalk)	16
14	William A. Buckingham (Norwich)	Republican	Mar 4, 1869 – Feb 5, 1875	Elected in 1868. Lost re-election and died before end of term.	15	42nd	14	Elected in 1866.	Mar 4, 1867 – Nov 21, 1875	Republican	Orris S. Ferry (Norwalk)	16
14	William A. Buckingham (Norwich)	Republican	Mar 4, 1869 – Feb 5, 1875	Elected in 1868. Lost re-election and died before end of term.	15	43rd	15	Re-elected in 1872. Died.	Mar 4, 1867 – Nov 21, 1875	Liberal Republican	Orris S. Ferry (Norwalk)	16
15	William W. Eaton (Hartford)	Democratic	Feb 5, 1875 – Mar 3, 1881	Appointed to finish Buckingham's term, having been elected to the next term.	15	43rd	15	Re-elected in 1872. Died.	Mar 4, 1867 – Nov 21, 1875	Liberal Republican	Orris S. Ferry (Norwalk)	16
15	William W. Eaton (Hartford)	Democratic	Feb 5, 1875 – Mar 3, 1881	Elected in 1874. Unknown if retired or lost re-election.	16	44th	15	Re-elected in 1872. Died.	Mar 4, 1867 – Nov 21, 1875	Republican	Orris S. Ferry (Norwalk)	16
15	William W. Eaton (Hartford)	Democratic	Feb 5, 1875 – Mar 3, 1881	Elected in 1874. Unknown if retired or lost re-election.	16	44th	15		Nov 21, 1875 – Nov 27, 1875	Vacant		
15	William W. Eaton (Hartford)	Democratic	Feb 5, 1875 – Mar 3, 1881	Elected in 1874. Unknown if retired or lost re-election.	16	44th	15	Appointed to continue Ferry's term. Lost special election to finish Ferry's term.	Nov 27, 1875 – May 17, 1876	Democratic	James E. English (New Haven)	17
15	William W. Eaton (Hartford)	Democratic	Feb 5, 1875 – Mar 3, 1881	Elected in 1874. Unknown if retired or lost re-election.	16	44th	15	Elected to finish Ferry's term.	May 17, 1876 – Mar 3, 1879	Democratic	William Barnum (Lime Rock)	18
15	William W. Eaton (Hartford)	Democratic	Feb 5, 1875 – Mar 3, 1881	Elected in 1874. Unknown if retired or lost re-election.	16	45th	15	Elected to finish Ferry's term.	May 17, 1876 – Mar 3, 1879	Democratic	William Barnum (Lime Rock)	18
15	William W. Eaton (Hartford)	Democratic	Feb 5, 1875 – Mar 3, 1881	Elected in 1874. Unknown if retired or lost re-election.	16	46th	16	Elected in 1879.	Mar 4, 1879 – Apr 21, 1905	Republican	Orville H. Platt (Meriden)	19
16	Joseph R. Hawley (Hartford)	Republican	Mar 4, 1881 – Mar 3, 1905	Elected in 1881.	17	47th	16	Elected in 1879.	Mar 4, 1879 – Apr 21, 1905	Republican	Orville H. Platt (Meriden)	19
16	Joseph R. Hawley (Hartford)	Republican	Mar 4, 1881 – Mar 3, 1905	Elected in 1881.	17	48th	16	Elected in 1879.	Mar 4, 1879 – Apr 21, 1905	Republican	Orville H. Platt (Meriden)	19
16	Joseph R. Hawley (Hartford)	Republican	Mar 4, 1881 – Mar 3, 1905	Elected in 1881.	17	49th	17	Re-elected in 1885.	Mar 4, 1879 – Apr 21, 1905	Republican	Orville H. Platt (Meriden)	19
16	Joseph R. Hawley (Hartford)	Republican	Mar 4, 1881 – Mar 3, 1905	Re-elected in 1887.	18	50th	17	Re-elected in 1885.	Mar 4, 1879 – Apr 21, 1905	Republican	Orville H. Platt (Meriden)	19
16	Joseph R. Hawley (Hartford)	Republican	Mar 4, 1881 – Mar 3, 1905	Re-elected in 1887.	18	51st	17	Re-elected in 1885.	Mar 4, 1879 – Apr 21, 1905	Republican	Orville H. Platt (Meriden)	19
16	Joseph R. Hawley (Hartford)	Republican	Mar 4, 1881 – Mar 3, 1905	Re-elected in 1887.	18	52nd	18	Re-elected in 1891.	Mar 4, 1879 – Apr 21, 1905	Republican	Orville H. Platt (Meriden)	19
16	Joseph R. Hawley (Hartford)	Republican	Mar 4, 1881 – Mar 3, 1905	Re-elected in 1893.	19	53rd	18	Re-elected in 1891.	Mar 4, 1879 – Apr 21, 1905	Republican	Orville H. Platt (Meriden)	19
16	Joseph R. Hawley (Hartford)	Republican	Mar 4, 1881 – Mar 3, 1905	Re-elected in 1893.	19	54th	18	Re-elected in 1891.	Mar 4, 1879 – Apr 21, 1905	Republican	Orville H. Platt (Meriden)	19
16	Joseph R. Hawley (Hartford)	Republican	Mar 4, 1881 – Mar 3, 1905	Re-elected in 1893.	19	55th	19	Re-elected in 1897.	Mar 4, 1879 – Apr 21, 1905	Republican	Orville H. Platt (Meriden)	19
16	Joseph R. Hawley (Hartford)	Republican	Mar 4, 1881 – Mar 3, 1905	Re-elected in 1899. Retired.	20	56th	19	Re-elected in 1897.	Mar 4, 1879 – Apr 21, 1905	Republican	Orville H. Platt (Meriden)	19
16	Joseph R. Hawley (Hartford)	Republican	Mar 4, 1881 – Mar 3, 1905	Re-elected in 1899. Retired.	20	57th	19	Re-elected in 1897.	Mar 4, 1879 – Apr 21, 1905	Republican	Orville H. Platt (Meriden)	19
16	Joseph R. Hawley (Hartford)	Republican	Mar 4, 1881 – Mar 3, 1905	Re-elected in 1899. Retired.	20	58th	20	Re-elected in 1903. Died.	Mar 4, 1879 – Apr 21, 1905	Republican	Orville H. Platt (Meriden)	19
16	Joseph R. Hawley (Hartford)	Republican	Mar 4, 1881 – Mar 3, 1905	Re-elected in 1899. Retired.	20	58th	20		Apr 21, 1905 – May 10, 1905	Vacant		
17	Morgan Bulkeley (Hartford)	Republican	Mar 4, 1905 – Mar 3, 1911	Elected in 1905. Lost re-election.	21	59th	20		Apr 21, 1905 – May 10, 1905	Vacant		
17	Morgan Bulkeley (Hartford)	Republican	Mar 4, 1905 – Mar 3, 1911	Elected in 1905. Lost re-election.	21	59th	20	Elected to finish Platt's term.	May 10, 1905 – Oct 14, 1924	Republican	Frank B. Brandegee (New London)	20
17	Morgan Bulkeley (Hartford)	Republican	Mar 4, 1905 – Mar 3, 1911	Elected in 1905. Lost re-election.	21	60th	20	Elected to finish Platt's term.	May 10, 1905 – Oct 14, 1924	Republican	Frank B. Brandegee (New London)	20
17	Morgan Bulkeley (Hartford)	Republican	Mar 4, 1905 – Mar 3, 1911	Elected in 1905. Lost re-election.	21	61st	21	Re-elected in 1909.	May 10, 1905 – Oct 14, 1924	Republican	Frank B. Brandegee (New London)	20
18	George P. McLean (Simsbury)	Republican	Mar 4, 1911 – Mar 3, 1929	Elected in 1911.	22	62nd	21	Re-elected in 1909.	May 10, 1905 – Oct 14, 1924	Republican	Frank B. Brandegee (New London)	20
18	George P. McLean (Simsbury)	Republican	Mar 4, 1911 – Mar 3, 1929	Elected in 1911.	22	63rd	21	Re-elected in 1909.	May 10, 1905 – Oct 14, 1924	Republican	Frank B. Brandegee (New London)	20
18	George P. McLean (Simsbury)	Republican	Mar 4, 1911 – Mar 3, 1929	Elected in 1911.	22	64th	22	Re-elected in 1914.	May 10, 1905 – Oct 14, 1924	Republican	Frank B. Brandegee (New London)	20
18	George P. McLean (Simsbury)	Republican	Mar 4, 1911 – Mar 3, 1929	Re-elected in 1916.	23	65th	22	Re-elected in 1914.	May 10, 1905 – Oct 14, 1924	Republican	Frank B. Brandegee (New London)	20
18	George P. McLean (Simsbury)	Republican	Mar 4, 1911 – Mar 3, 1929	Re-elected in 1916.	23	66th	22	Re-elected in 1914.	May 10, 1905 – Oct 14, 1924	Republican	Frank B. Brandegee (New London)	20
18	George P. McLean (Simsbury)	Republican	Mar 4, 1911 – Mar 3, 1929	Re-elected in 1916.	23	67th	23	Re-elected in 1920. Died.	May 10, 1905 – Oct 14, 1924	Republican	Frank B. Brandegee (New London)	20
18	George P. McLean (Simsbury)	Republican	Mar 4, 1911 – Mar 3, 1929	Re-elected in 1922. Retired.	24	68th	23	Re-elected in 1920. Died.	May 10, 1905 – Oct 14, 1924	Republican	Frank B. Brandegee (New London)	20
18	George P. McLean (Simsbury)	Republican	Mar 4, 1911 – Mar 3, 1929	Re-elected in 1922. Retired.	24	68th	23		Oct 14, 1924 – Dec 17, 1924	Vacant		
18	George P. McLean (Simsbury)	Republican	Mar 4, 1911 – Mar 3, 1929	Re-elected in 1922. Retired.	24	68th	23	Elected to finish Brandegee's term and seated Jan 8, 1925.	Dec 17, 1924 – Mar 3, 1933	Republican	Hiram Bingham III (New Haven)	21
18	George P. McLean (Simsbury)	Republican	Mar 4, 1911 – Mar 3, 1929	Re-elected in 1922. Retired.	24	69th	23	Elected to finish Brandegee's term and seated Jan 8, 1925.	Dec 17, 1924 – Mar 3, 1933	Republican	Hiram Bingham III (New Haven)	21
18	George P. McLean (Simsbury)	Republican	Mar 4, 1911 – Mar 3, 1929	Re-elected in 1922. Retired.	24	70th	24	Re-elected in 1926. Lost re-election.	Dec 17, 1924 – Mar 3, 1933	Republican	Hiram Bingham III (New Haven)	21
19	Frederic C. Walcott (Norfolk)	Republican	Mar 4, 1929 – Jan 3, 1935	Elected in 1928. Lost re-election.	25	71st	24	Re-elected in 1926. Lost re-election.	Dec 17, 1924 – Mar 3, 1933	Republican	Hiram Bingham III (New Haven)	21
19	Frederic C. Walcott (Norfolk)	Republican	Mar 4, 1929 – Jan 3, 1935	Elected in 1928. Lost re-election.	25	72nd	24	Re-elected in 1926. Lost re-election.	Dec 17, 1924 – Mar 3, 1933	Republican	Hiram Bingham III (New Haven)	21
19	Frederic C. Walcott (Norfolk)	Republican	Mar 4, 1929 – Jan 3, 1935	Elected in 1928. Lost re-election.	25	73rd	25	Elected in 1932. Lost re-election.	Mar 4, 1933 – Jan 3, 1939	Democratic	Augustine Lonergan (Hartford)	22
20	Francis T. Maloney (Meriden)	Democratic	Jan 3, 1935 – Jan 16, 1945	Elected in 1934.	26	74th	25	Elected in 1932. Lost re-election.	Mar 4, 1933 – Jan 3, 1939	Democratic	Augustine Lonergan (Hartford)	22
20	Francis T. Maloney (Meriden)	Democratic	Jan 3, 1935 – Jan 16, 1945	Elected in 1934.	26	75th	25	Elected in 1932. Lost re-election.	Mar 4, 1933 – Jan 3, 1939	Democratic	Augustine Lonergan (Hartford)	22
20	Francis T. Maloney (Meriden)	Democratic	Jan 3, 1935 – Jan 16, 1945	Elected in 1934.	26	76th	26	Elected in 1938. Lost re-election.	Jan 3, 1939 – Jan 3, 1945	Republican	John A. Danaher (Portland)	23
20	Francis T. Maloney (Meriden)	Democratic	Jan 3, 1935 – Jan 16, 1945	Re-elected in 1940. Died.	27	77th	26	Elected in 1938. Lost re-election.	Jan 3, 1939 – Jan 3, 1945	Republican	John A. Danaher (Portland)	23
20	Francis T. Maloney (Meriden)	Democratic	Jan 3, 1935 – Jan 16, 1945	Re-elected in 1940. Died.	27	78th	26	Elected in 1938. Lost re-election.	Jan 3, 1939 – Jan 3, 1945	Republican	John A. Danaher (Portland)	23
20	Francis T. Maloney (Meriden)	Democratic	Jan 3, 1935 – Jan 16, 1945	Re-elected in 1940. Died.	27	79th	27	Elected in 1944.	Jan 3, 1945 – Jul 28, 1952	Democratic	Brien McMahon (Norwalk)	24
Vacant			Jan 16, 1945 – Feb 15, 1945		27	79th	27	Elected in 1944.	Jan 3, 1945 – Jul 28, 1952	Democratic	Brien McMahon (Norwalk)	24
21	Thomas C. Hart (Sharon)	Republican	Feb 15, 1945 – Nov 5, 1946	Appointed to continue Maloney's term. Successor qualified.	27	79th	27	Elected in 1944.	Jan 3, 1945 – Jul 28, 1952	Democratic	Brien McMahon (Norwalk)	24
Vacant			Nov 5, 1946 – Dec 27, 1946		27	79th	27	Elected in 1944.	Jan 3, 1945 – Jul 28, 1952	Democratic	Brien McMahon (Norwalk)	24
22	Raymond E. Baldwin (Stratford)	Republican	Dec 27, 1946 – Dec 16, 1949	Elected to finish Maloney's term.	27	79th	27	Elected in 1944.	Jan 3, 1945 – Jul 28, 1952	Democratic	Brien McMahon (Norwalk)	24
22	Raymond E. Baldwin (Stratford)	Republican	Dec 27, 1946 – Dec 16, 1949	Elected to full term in 1946. Resigned.	28	80th	27	Elected in 1944.	Jan 3, 1945 – Jul 28, 1952	Democratic	Brien McMahon (Norwalk)	24
22	Raymond E. Baldwin (Stratford)	Republican	Dec 27, 1946 – Dec 16, 1949	Elected to full term in 1946. Resigned.	28	81st	27	Elected in 1944.	Jan 3, 1945 – Jul 28, 1952	Democratic	Brien McMahon (Norwalk)	24
23	William Benton (Southport)	Democratic	Dec 17, 1949 – Jan 3, 1953	Appointed to continue Baldwin's term. Elected to finish Baldwin's term. Lost re-election.	28	81st	27	Elected in 1944.	Jan 3, 1945 – Jul 28, 1952	Democratic	Brien McMahon (Norwalk)	24
23	William Benton (Southport)	Democratic	Dec 17, 1949 – Jan 3, 1953	Appointed to continue Baldwin's term. Elected to finish Baldwin's term. Lost re-election.	28	82nd	28	Re-elected in 1950. Died.	Jan 3, 1945 – Jul 28, 1952	Democratic	Brien McMahon (Norwalk)	24
23	William Benton (Southport)	Democratic	Dec 17, 1949 – Jan 3, 1953	Appointed to continue Baldwin's term. Elected to finish Baldwin's term. Lost re-election.	28	82nd	28		Jul 28, 1952 – Aug 29, 1952	Vacant		
23	William Benton (Southport)	Democratic	Dec 17, 1949 – Jan 3, 1953	Appointed to continue Baldwin's term. Elected to finish Baldwin's term. Lost re-election.	28	82nd	28	Appointed to continue McMahon's term. Resigned when successor was elected.	Aug 29, 1952 – Nov 4, 1952	Republican	William A. Purtell (West Hartford)	25
23	William Benton (Southport)	Democratic	Dec 17, 1949 – Jan 3, 1953	Appointed to continue Baldwin's term. Elected to finish Baldwin's term. Lost re-election.	28	82nd	28	Elected to finish McMahon's term.	Nov 4, 1952 – Jan 3, 1963	Republican	Prescott Bush (Greenwich)	26
24	William A. Purtell (West Hartford)	Republican	Jan 3, 1953 – Jan 3, 1959	Elected in 1952. Lost re-election.	29	83rd	28	Elected to finish McMahon's term.	Nov 4, 1952 – Jan 3, 1963	Republican	Prescott Bush (Greenwich)	26
24	William A. Purtell (West Hartford)	Republican	Jan 3, 1953 – Jan 3, 1959	Elected in 1952. Lost re-election.	29	84th	28	Elected to finish McMahon's term.	Nov 4, 1952 – Jan 3, 1963	Republican	Prescott Bush (Greenwich)	26
24	William A. Purtell (West Hartford)	Republican	Jan 3, 1953 – Jan 3, 1959	Elected in 1952. Lost re-election.	29	85th	29	Re-elected in 1956. Retired.	Nov 4, 1952 – Jan 3, 1963	Republican	Prescott Bush (Greenwich)	26
25	Thomas J. Dodd (Old Lyme)	Democratic	Jan 3, 1959 – Jan 3, 1971	Elected in 1958.	30	86th	29	Re-elected in 1956. Retired.	Nov 4, 1952 – Jan 3, 1963	Republican	Prescott Bush (Greenwich)	26
25	Thomas J. Dodd (Old Lyme)	Democratic	Jan 3, 1959 – Jan 3, 1971	Elected in 1958.	30	87th	29	Re-elected in 1956. Retired.	Nov 4, 1952 – Jan 3, 1963	Republican	Prescott Bush (Greenwich)	26
25	Thomas J. Dodd (Old Lyme)	Democratic	Jan 3, 1959 – Jan 3, 1971	Elected in 1958.	30	88th	30	Elected in 1962.	Jan 3, 1963 – Jan 3, 1981	Democratic	Abraham Ribicoff (Hartford)	27
25	Thomas J. Dodd (Old Lyme)	Democratic	Jan 3, 1959 – Jan 3, 1971	Re-elected in 1964. Lost renomination, and lost re-election as an independent.	31	89th	30	Elected in 1962.	Jan 3, 1963 – Jan 3, 1981	Democratic	Abraham Ribicoff (Hartford)	27
25	Thomas J. Dodd (Old Lyme)	Democratic	Jan 3, 1959 – Jan 3, 1971	Re-elected in 1964. Lost renomination, and lost re-election as an independent.	31	90th	30	Elected in 1962.	Jan 3, 1963 – Jan 3, 1981	Democratic	Abraham Ribicoff (Hartford)	27
25	Thomas J. Dodd (Old Lyme)	Democratic	Jan 3, 1959 – Jan 3, 1971	Re-elected in 1964. Lost renomination, and lost re-election as an independent.	31	91st	31	Re-elected in 1968.	Jan 3, 1963 – Jan 3, 1981	Democratic	Abraham Ribicoff (Hartford)	27
26	Lowell Weicker (Stonington)	Republican	Jan 3, 1971 – Jan 3, 1989	Elected in 1970.	32	92nd	31	Re-elected in 1968.	Jan 3, 1963 – Jan 3, 1981	Democratic	Abraham Ribicoff (Hartford)	27
26	Lowell Weicker (Stonington)	Republican	Jan 3, 1971 – Jan 3, 1989	Elected in 1970.	32	93rd	31	Re-elected in 1968.	Jan 3, 1963 – Jan 3, 1981	Democratic	Abraham Ribicoff (Hartford)	27
26	Lowell Weicker (Stonington)	Republican	Jan 3, 1971 – Jan 3, 1989	Elected in 1970.	32	94th	32	Re-elected in 1974. Retired.	Jan 3, 1963 – Jan 3, 1981	Democratic	Abraham Ribicoff (Hartford)	27
26	Lowell Weicker (Stonington)	Republican	Jan 3, 1971 – Jan 3, 1989	Re-elected in 1976.	33	95th	32	Re-elected in 1974. Retired.	Jan 3, 1963 – Jan 3, 1981	Democratic	Abraham Ribicoff (Hartford)	27
26	Lowell Weicker (Stonington)	Republican	Jan 3, 1971 – Jan 3, 1989	Re-elected in 1976.	33	96th	32	Re-elected in 1974. Retired.	Jan 3, 1963 – Jan 3, 1981	Democratic	Abraham Ribicoff (Hartford)	27
26	Lowell Weicker (Stonington)	Republican	Jan 3, 1971 – Jan 3, 1989	Re-elected in 1976.	33	97th	33	Elected in 1980.	Jan 3, 1981 – Jan 3, 2011	Democratic	Chris Dodd (East Haddam)	28
26	Lowell Weicker (Stonington)	Republican	Jan 3, 1971 – Jan 3, 1989	Re-elected in 1982. Lost re-election.	34	98th	33	Elected in 1980.	Jan 3, 1981 – Jan 3, 2011	Democratic	Chris Dodd (East Haddam)	28
26	Lowell Weicker (Stonington)	Republican	Jan 3, 1971 – Jan 3, 1989	Re-elected in 1982. Lost re-election.	34	99th	33	Elected in 1980.	Jan 3, 1981 – Jan 3, 2011	Democratic	Chris Dodd (East Haddam)	28
26	Lowell Weicker (Stonington)	Republican	Jan 3, 1971 – Jan 3, 1989	Re-elected in 1982. Lost re-election.	34	100th	34	Re-elected in 1986.	Jan 3, 1981 – Jan 3, 2011	Democratic	Chris Dodd (East Haddam)	28
27	Joe Lieberman (New Haven)	Democratic	Jan 3, 1989 – Jan 3, 2013	Elected in 1988.	35	101st	34	Re-elected in 1986.	Jan 3, 1981 – Jan 3, 2011	Democratic	Chris Dodd (East Haddam)	28
27	Joe Lieberman (New Haven)	Democratic	Jan 3, 1989 – Jan 3, 2013	Elected in 1988.	35	102nd	34	Re-elected in 1986.	Jan 3, 1981 – Jan 3, 2011	Democratic	Chris Dodd (East Haddam)	28
27	Joe Lieberman (New Haven)	Democratic	Jan 3, 1989 – Jan 3, 2013	Elected in 1988.	35	103rd	35	Re-elected in 1992.	Jan 3, 1981 – Jan 3, 2011	Democratic	Chris Dodd (East Haddam)	28
27	Joe Lieberman (New Haven)	Democratic	Jan 3, 1989 – Jan 3, 2013	Re-elected in 1994.	36	104th	35	Re-elected in 1992.	Jan 3, 1981 – Jan 3, 2011	Democratic	Chris Dodd (East Haddam)	28
27	Joe Lieberman (New Haven)	Democratic	Jan 3, 1989 – Jan 3, 2013	Re-elected in 1994.	36	105th	35	Re-elected in 1992.	Jan 3, 1981 – Jan 3, 2011	Democratic	Chris Dodd (East Haddam)	28
27	Joe Lieberman (New Haven)	Democratic	Jan 3, 1989 – Jan 3, 2013	Re-elected in 1994.	36	106th	36	Re-elected in 1998.	Jan 3, 1981 – Jan 3, 2011	Democratic	Chris Dodd (East Haddam)	28
27	Joe Lieberman (New Haven)	Democratic	Jan 3, 1989 – Jan 3, 2013	Re-elected in 2000.	37	107th	36	Re-elected in 1998.	Jan 3, 1981 – Jan 3, 2011	Democratic	Chris Dodd (East Haddam)	28
27	Joe Lieberman (New Haven)	Democratic	Jan 3, 1989 – Jan 3, 2013	Re-elected in 2000.	37	108th	36	Re-elected in 1998.	Jan 3, 1981 – Jan 3, 2011	Democratic	Chris Dodd (East Haddam)	28
27	Joe Lieberman (New Haven)	Democratic	Jan 3, 1989 – Jan 3, 2013	Re-elected in 2000.	37	109th	37	Re-elected in 2004. Retired.	Jan 3, 1981 – Jan 3, 2011	Democratic	Chris Dodd (East Haddam)	28
27	Joe Lieberman (New Haven)	Independent	Jan 3, 1989 – Jan 3, 2013	Lost re-nomination, but re-elected in 2006 as an independent. Retired.	38	110th	37	Re-elected in 2004. Retired.	Jan 3, 1981 – Jan 3, 2011	Democratic	Chris Dodd (East Haddam)	28
27	Joe Lieberman (New Haven)	Independent	Jan 3, 1989 – Jan 3, 2013	Lost re-nomination, but re-elected in 2006 as an independent. Retired.	38	111th	37	Re-elected in 2004. Retired.	Jan 3, 1981 – Jan 3, 2011	Democratic	Chris Dodd (East Haddam)	28
27	Joe Lieberman (New Haven)	Independent	Jan 3, 1989 – Jan 3, 2013	Lost re-nomination, but re-elected in 2006 as an independent. Retired.	38	112th	38	Elected in 2010.	Jan 3, 2011 – present	Democratic	Richard Blumenthal (Greenwich)	29
28	Chris Murphy (Hartford)	Democratic	Jan 3, 2013 – present	Elected in 2012.	39	113th	38	Elected in 2010.	Jan 3, 2011 – present	Democratic	Richard Blumenthal (Greenwich)	29
28	Chris Murphy (Hartford)	Democratic	Jan 3, 2013 – present	Elected in 2012.	39	114th	38	Elected in 2010.	Jan 3, 2011 – present	Democratic	Richard Blumenthal (Greenwich)	29
28	Chris Murphy (Hartford)	Democratic	Jan 3, 2013 – present	Elected in 2012.	39	115th	39	Re-elected in 2016.	Jan 3, 2011 – present	Democratic	Richard Blumenthal (Greenwich)	29
28	Chris Murphy (Hartford)	Democratic	Jan 3, 2013 – present	Re-elected in 2018.	40	116th	39	Re-elected in 2016.	Jan 3, 2011 – present	Democratic	Richard Blumenthal (Greenwich)	29
28	Chris Murphy (Hartford)	Democratic	Jan 3, 2013 – present	Re-elected in 2018.	40	117th	39	Re-elected in 2016.	Jan 3, 2011 – present	Democratic	Richard Blumenthal (Greenwich)	29
28	Chris Murphy (Hartford)	Democratic	Jan 3, 2013 – present	Re-elected in 2018.	40	118th	40	Re-elected in 2022.	Jan 3, 2011 – present	Democratic	Richard Blumenthal (Greenwich)	29
28	Chris Murphy (Hartford)	Democratic	Jan 3, 2013 – present	Re-elected in 2024.	41	119th	40	Re-elected in 2022.	Jan 3, 2011 – present	Democratic	Richard Blumenthal (Greenwich)	29
28	Chris Murphy (Hartford)	Democratic	Jan 3, 2013 – present	Re-elected in 2024.	41	120th	40	Re-elected in 2022.	Jan 3, 2011 – present	Democratic	Richard Blumenthal (Greenwich)	29
28	Chris Murphy (Hartford)	Democratic	Jan 3, 2013 – present	Re-elected in 2024.	41	121st	41	To be determined in the 2028 election.				
To be determined in the 2030 election.					42	122nd	41	To be determined in the 2028 election.				

== See also ==
- Connecticut's congressional delegations
- Elections in Connecticut
- List of United States representatives from Connecticut
