= William H. T. Bush =

American banker and member of the Bush family

- Born: William Henry Trotter Bush; July 14, 1938; Greenwich, Connecticut, US
- Died: February 27, 2018 (aged 79); West Palm Beach, Florida, US
- Education: Hotchkiss School; Yale University (B.A.)
- Political party: Republican
- Spouse: Patricia Redfearn (m. 1959; died 2015)
- Children: 2
- Parent(s): Prescott Bush; Dorothy Walker Bush
- Relatives: Bush family

William Henry Trotter Bush, CStJ (July 14, 1938 – February 27, 2018) was an American banker and businessman. A scion of the Bush family, he was the youngest son of US Senator Prescott Sheldon Bush and Dorothy Walker Bush, the youngest brother of former president George H. W. Bush, and an uncle of former president George W. Bush and former Florida governor Jeb Bush.

== Biography ==
Born in Greenwich, Connecticut, he graduated from the Hotchkiss School, Lakeville, Connecticut in 1956, and earned a B.A. from Yale University in 1960, where he became a brother of the Psi Upsilon fraternity. In 2009, he was appointed a Commander Brother of the Most Venerable Order of the Hospital of Saint John of Jerusalem by Queen Elizabeth II.

Bush lived in St. Louis, Missouri, also the home of his late grandfather George Herbert Walker. He was married in 1959 to Patricia Redfearn, who died November 10, 2015. They had two children: William Prescott "Scott" Bush and Louisa Bush McCall. Bush died on February 27, 2018, in West Palm Beach, Florida, survived by three of his older siblings.

== Business ==
Bush worked in banking and venture capital, and sat on a number of corporate boards. He founded Bush O'Donnell & Co. in 1986 and remained CEO of that firm until his death. He worked on the election campaigns of George H. W., George W., and Jeb Bush, primarily as a fundraiser.

A former president of and director of the St. Louis-based Boatmen's Bancshares from 1978 to 1986, Bush was active in various St. Louis civic functions: he was chairman of the Board of Trustees of Saint Louis University from 1985 to 1992, chairman of the Missouri Botanical Garden from 1991 to 1993 and president of the Municipal Opera Association from 2005 to 2006. He was also a director of Maritz, Inc, and served on the Blue Cross Blue Shield of Missouri board of directors from 1989 to 1994.

On May 18, 2010, Bush was taken to Methodist Hospital of Indianapolis after collapsing during a WellPoint shareholder's meeting in Indianapolis. Bush was on the company's board of directors. One of the doctors at the hospital said that Bush was alert and talking and he "felt like he was going to be OK".
