= Prescott Bush =

American politician (1895–1972)

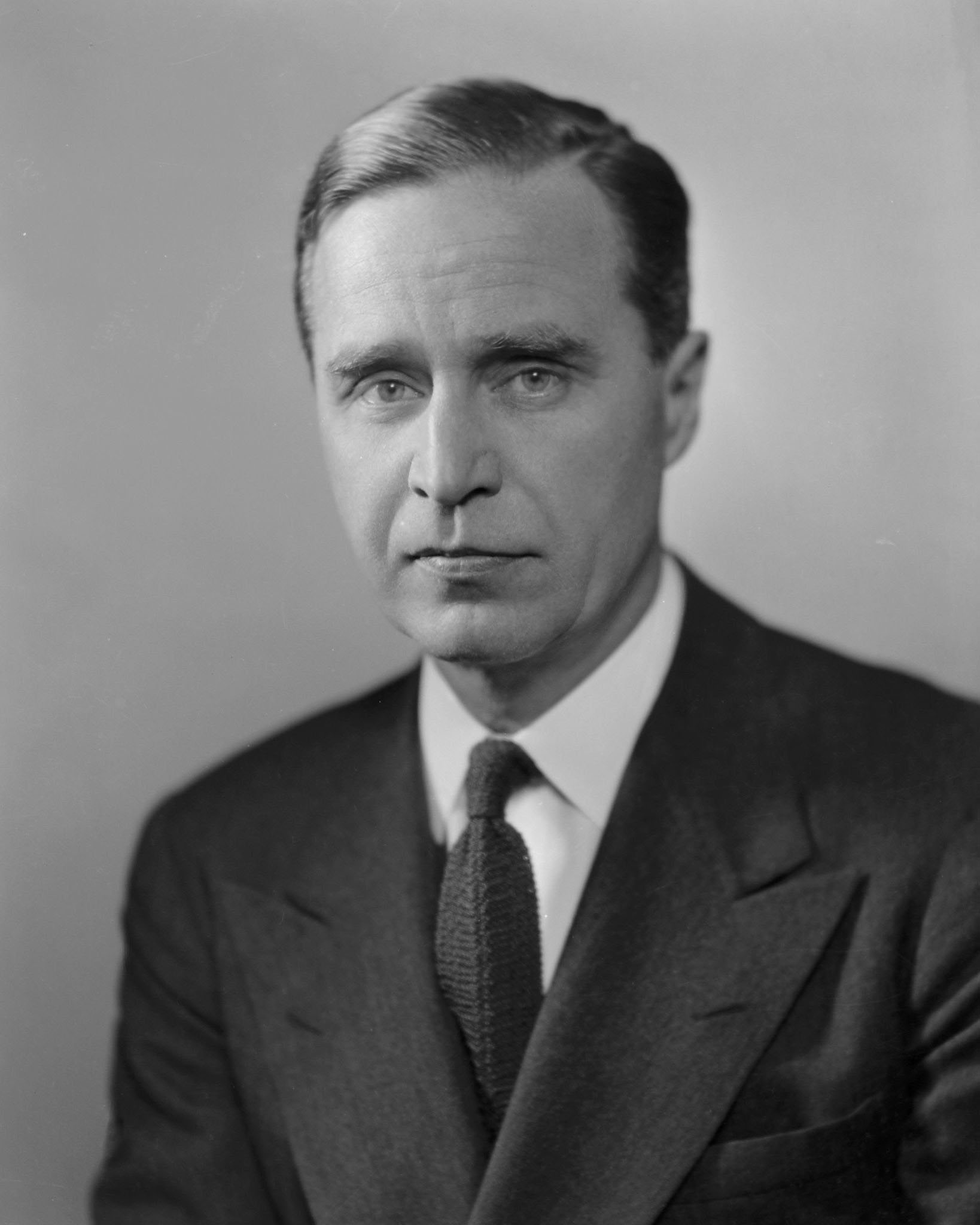
- Bush in 1948

United States Senator from Connecticut
- In office November 4, 1952 – January 3, 1963
- Preceded by: William A. Purtell
- Succeeded by: Abraham Ribicoff

Personal details
- Born: Prescott Sheldon Bush; May 15, 1895 Columbus, Ohio, U.S.
- Died: October 8, 1972 (aged 77) New York City, New York, U.S.
- Party: Republican
- Spouse: Dorothy Walker (m. 1921)
- Children: 5, including Prescott S. Bush Jr., George, Nancy, Jonathan, and William
- Parent: Samuel P. Bush
- Relatives: Bush family
- Education: Yale University (BA)

Military service
- Allegiance: United States
- Branch/service: United States Army
- Years of service: 1917–1919
- Rank: Captain
- Unit: 158th Field Artillery Brigade
- Battles/wars: World War I
- Bush's voice Bush interviewed on Longines Chronoscope. Recorded September 9, 1953

Prescott Sheldon Bush (May 15, 1895 – October 8, 1972) was an American banker and Republican Party politician. After working as a Wall Street executive investment banker, he represented Connecticut in the United States Senate from 1952 to 1963. A member of the Bush family, he was the father of President George H. W. Bush, and the paternal grandfather of President George W. Bush and Florida governor Jeb Bush.

Born in Columbus, Ohio, Bush graduated from Yale College and served as an artillery officer during World War I. After the war, he worked for several companies, becoming a minor partner of the Brown Brothers Harriman & Co. investment bank in 1931. He served in several high-ranking United States Golf Association offices, including president of that organization. Bush settled in Connecticut in 1925.

Bush won election to the Senate in a 1952 special election, narrowly defeating Democratic nominee Abraham Ribicoff. In the Senate, Bush staunchly supported President Dwight D. Eisenhower and helped enact legislation to create the Interstate Highway System. Bush won re-election in 1956 but declined to seek re-election in 1962, retiring from the Senate the following year.

== Early life ==
Prescott Sheldon Bush was born in Columbus, Ohio, on May 15, 1895 to Samuel Prescott Bush and Flora Sheldon Bush. Samuel Bush was a railroad middle manager, then a steel company president and, during World War I, a federal government official in charge of coordination of and assistance to major weapons contractors.

Bush attended St. George's School in Middletown, Rhode Island, from 1908 to 1913. In 1913, he enrolled at Yale College, where his paternal grandfather, Rev. James Smith Bush (class of 1844), and his maternal uncle Robert E. Sheldon Jr. (class of 1904) had matriculated. Three subsequent generations of the Bush family have been Yale alumni.

Prescott Bush was admitted to the Zeta Psi fraternity and Skull and Bones secret society. George H. W. Bush was also a member of the society, as is his son, George W. Bush. George H. W. Bush and George W. Bush were, however, not members of Zeta Psi, and were members, instead, of the Delta Kappa Epsilon fraternity. According to Skull and Bones lore, Prescott Bush was among a group of Bonesmen who dug up and removed the skull of Geronimo from his grave at Fort Sill, Oklahoma, in 1918. According to historian David L. Miller, the Bonesmen probably dug up somebody at Fort Sill, but not Geronimo.

Prescott Bush was a cheerleader, played varsity golf and baseball, sang in the Whiffenpoofs, and was president of the Yale Glee Club.

After graduation, Bush served as a field artillery captain with the American Expeditionary Forces (1917–1919) during World War I. He received intelligence training at Verdun, France and was briefly assigned to a staff of French officers. Alternating between intelligence and artillery, he came under fire in the Meuse–Argonne offensive.

== Business career ==
After his discharge in 1919, Prescott Bush went to work for the Simmons Hardware Company in St. Louis, Missouri.

The Bush family moved to Columbus, Ohio, in 1923, where Prescott briefly worked for the Hupp Products Company. In November 1923, he became president of sales for Stedman Products in South Braintree, Massachusetts. During this time, he lived in a Victorian house at 173 Adams Street in Milton, Massachusetts, where his son, George H. W. Bush, was born.

He then joined the United States Rubber Company of New York City as manager of the foreign division, and moved to Greenwich, Connecticut. The new house in Greenwich had been purchased for him by his father-in-law George Herbert Walker, and in his wife Dorothy's name instead of his.

In 1926, Bush became vice-president of the investment bank A. Harriman & Co. where his father-in-law was president. Bush's Yale classmates and fellow Bonesmen E. Roland Harriman and Knight Woolley also worked with the company.

In 1931, he became a partner of Brown Brothers Harriman & Co., which was created through the 1931 amalgamation of A. Harriman & Co with Brown Bros. & Co., (a merchant bank founded in Philadelphia in 1818) and with Harriman Brothers & Co. (established in New York City in 1927).

He was an avid golfer, and in 1935 was named head of the USGA.

From 1944 to 1956, Prescott Bush was a member of the Yale Corporation, the principal governing body of Yale University. He was on the board of directors of CBS, having been introduced to chairman William S. Paley around 1932 by his close friend and colleague W. Averell Harriman, who became a major Democratic Party power broker.

== Business Plot and Union Banking Corporation ==
In July 2007, Harper's Magazine published an article by Scott Horton, an American attorney known for his work in human rights law and the law of armed conflict, claiming that Prescott Bush was involved in the 1934 Business Plot, a failed plan by some of America's wealthy to trick retired Marine Corps major general Smedley Butler into helping them overthrow President Franklin D. Roosevelt.

Bush was a founder and one of seven directors (including W. Averell Harriman) of the Union Banking Corporation (holding a single share out of 4,000 as a director), an investment bank that operated as a clearing house for many assets and enterprises held by German steel magnate Fritz Thyssen, an early supporter of Adolf Hitler and financier of the Nazi Party. In July 1942, the bank was suspected of holding gold on behalf of Nazi leaders. A subsequent government investigation disproved those allegations but confirmed the Thyssens' control, and in October 1942 the United States seized the bank under the Trading with the Enemy Act and held the assets for the duration of World War II.

Journalist Duncan Campbell pointed out documents showing that Prescott Bush was a director and shareholder of a number of companies involved with Thyssen. Bush was the director of the Union Banking Corporation that "represented Thyssen's US interests", continuing to work for the bank after America's entry into the war.

== Political career ==
Prescott Bush was politically active on social issues. He became involved with the American Birth Control League as early as 1942, and served as the treasurer of the first nationwide campaign of Planned Parenthood in 1947. He was also an early supporter of the United Negro College Fund, serving as chairman of the Connecticut branch in 1951.

From 1947 to 1950, he served as Connecticut Republican finance chairman, and was the Republican candidate for the United States Senate in the 1950 special election. A columnist in Boston said that Bush "is coming on to be known as President Truman's Harry Hopkins. Nobody knows Mr. Bush and he hasn't a Chinaman's chance." (Harry Hopkins had been one of Franklin D. Roosevelt's closest advisors.) Bush's ties with Planned Parenthood also hurt him in strongly-Catholic Connecticut, and were the basis of a last-minute campaign in churches by Bush's opponents; the family vigorously denied the connection, but Bush lost to Sen. William Burnett Benton by only 1,102 votes.

Prescott Bush sought a rematch with Sen. Benton in 1952, but withdrew as the Republican party turned to William Purtell. The death of Senator Brien McMahon later that year, however, created a vacancy, and this time the Republicans nominated Bush. He defeated the Democratic nominee, Abraham Ribicoff, and was elected to the Senate. A staunch supporter of President Dwight D. Eisenhower, he served until January 1963. He was re-elected in 1956 with 55% of the vote over Democrat Thomas J. Dodd (later U.S. Senator from Connecticut and father of Christopher J. Dodd), and decided not to run for another term in 1962. He was a key ally for the passage of Eisenhower's Interstate Highway System, and during his tenure supported the Polaris submarine project (built by Electric Boat Corporation in Groton, Connecticut) and the establishment of the Peace Corps. He voted in favor of the Civil Rights Acts of 1957 and 1960 and of the 24th Amendment to the U.S. Constitution.

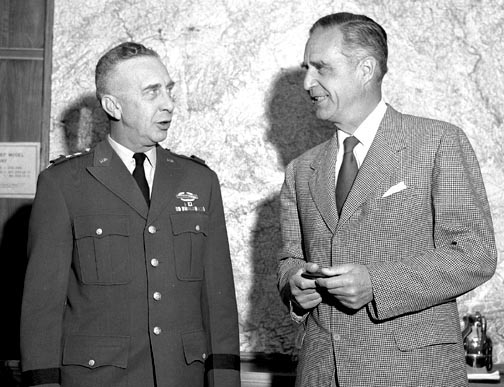
General Henry I. Hodes with Prescott Bush

On December 2, 1954, Prescott Bush was part of the large (67–22) Senate majority to censure Wisconsin Republican Senator Joseph McCarthy after McCarthy had taken on the U.S. Army and the Eisenhower administration. During the debate leading to the censure, Bush said that McCarthy had

"caused dangerous divisions among the American people because of his attitude and the attitude he has encouraged among his followers: that there can be no honest differences of opinion with him. Either you must follow Senator McCarthy blindly, not daring to express any doubts or disagreements about any of his actions, or, in his eyes, you must be a Communist, a Communist sympathizer, or a fool who has been duped by the Communist line."

Eisenhower later included Prescott Bush on an undated handwritten list of prospective candidates he favored for the 1960 Republican presidential nomination.

In terms of issues, Bush often agreed with New York Governor Nelson Rockefeller. According to Theodore H. White's book about the 1964 presidential election, Bush and Rockefeller were longtime friends. Bush favored a Nixon-Rockefeller ticket for 1960, and was presumed to support Rockefeller's 1964 presidential candidacy until the latter's remarriage in 1963. Bush then publicly denounced Rockefeller for divorcing his first wife and marrying a woman with whom Rockefeller had been having an affair while married to his first wife. Bush then very publicly endorsed his former Senate colleague Henry Cabot Lodge Jr., who was also the older brother of one of Bush's protegés, former Connecticut Governor John Davis Lodge.

Senator Bush's major legislative interests extended to protection from floods and hurricanes. He drafted the 1955 Bush Hurricane Survey Act (Public Law 71), enabling U.S. Army engineers to develop a new program of community protection against tidal flooding. Bush and Representative John W. McCormack, the Democratic House Majority Leader, co-sponsored the Bush-McCormack Act (Public Law 685), which expedited the construction of local flood-protection works.

== Personal life and death ==
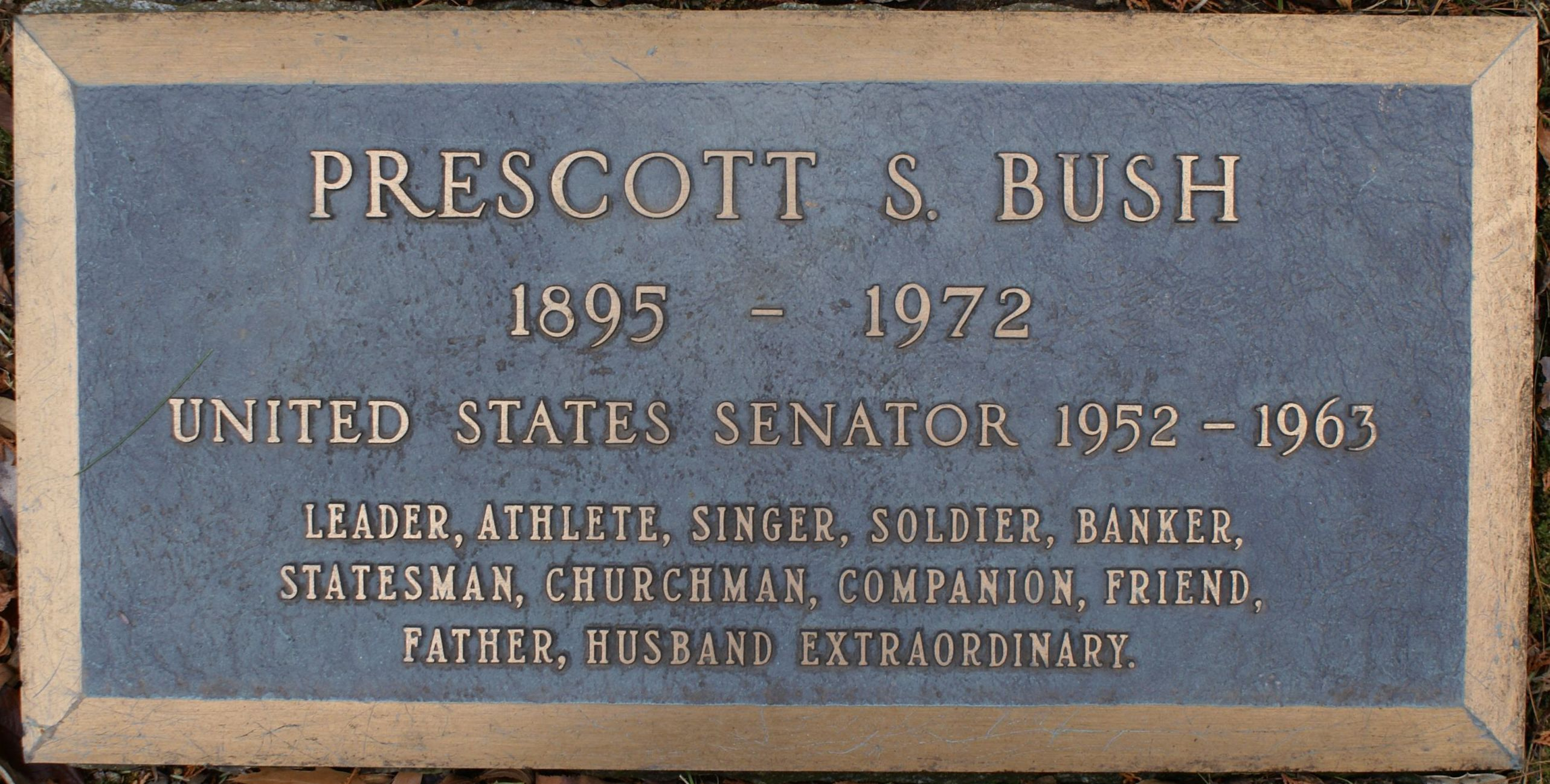
The grave of Prescott Bush

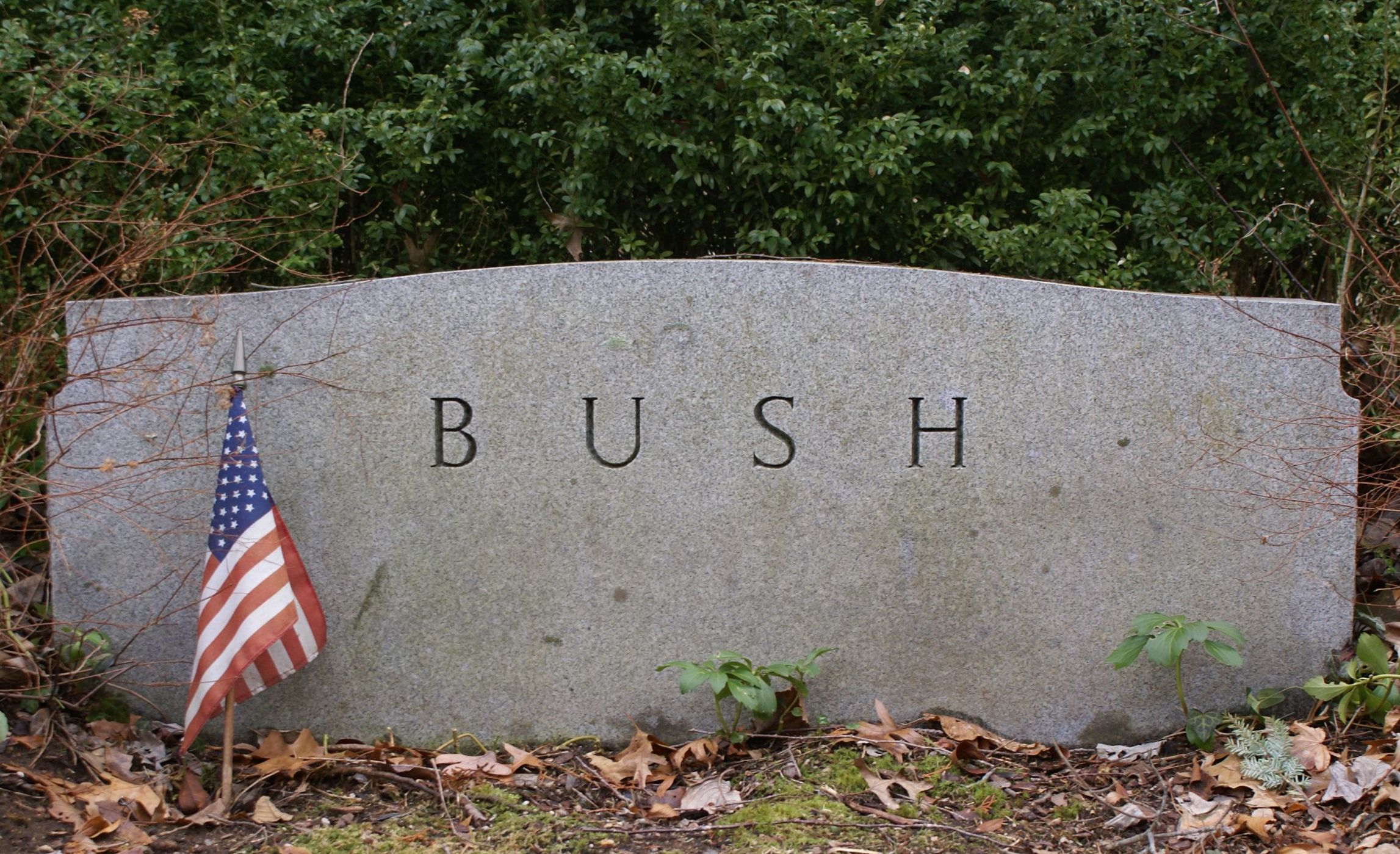
The headstone of Prescott Bush

Prescott Bush married Dorothy Walker (1901–1992) on August 6, 1921, in Kennebunkport, Maine; they had met through Dorothy's sister Nancy. Dorothy Walker Bush was a founding member of the Junior League of Columbus, Ohio in 1923. They had five children: Prescott Jr. (1922–2010), George (1924–2018), Nancy (1926–2021), Jonathan (1931–2021), and William "Bucky" (1938–2018). He was Episcopalian, although he rarely discussed his faith publicly.

Bush founded the Yale Glee Club Associates, an alumni group, in 1937. As was his father-in-law, he was a member of the United States Golf Association, serving successively as secretary, vice-president and president, 1928–1935. He was a multi-year club champion of the Round Hill Club in Greenwich, Connecticut, and was on the committee set up by New York City Mayor Robert F. Wagner Jr. to help create the New York Mets.

He was a member of the American Legion and the 40 & 8 Society.

Bush maintained homes in New York City, Long Island, Greenwich, the Walker's Point Estate, and Fishers Island, a secluded island off the Connecticut coast.

He died of cancer in 1972 at age 77 at Memorial Hospital in New York City, and is interred at Putnam Cemetery in Greenwich, Connecticut.

== Writings ==
Bush's articles include:

- "Timely Monetary Policy", Banking, June 1955 and July 1955
- "To Preserve Peace Let's Show the Russians How Strong We Are!" Reader's Digest, July 1959
- "Politics Is Your Business", Chamber of Commerce, State of New York, Bulletin, May 1960

== See also ==
- List of members of the American Legion

Party political offices
Preceded by Raymond E. Baldwin	Republican nominee for U.S. Senator from Connecticut (Class 1); 1950	Succeeded by William A. Purtell
Preceded by Joseph E. Talbot	Republican nominee for U.S. Senator from Connecticut (Class 3); 1952, 1956	Succeeded by Horace Seely-Brown Jr.
U.S. Senate
Preceded by William A. Purtell	U.S. Senator (Class 3) from Connecticut; 1952–1963; Served alongside: William Benton, William A. Purtell, Thomas J. Dodd	Succeeded by Abraham A. Ribicoff
