= Joseph E. Talbot =

American politician (1901–1966)

- Talbot c. 1946

Member of the U.S. House of Representatives from Connecticut's 5th district
- In office January 20, 1942 – January 3, 1947
- Preceded by: J. Joseph Smith
- Succeeded by: James T. Patterson

Connecticut State Treasurer
- In office 1939–1941
- Governor: Raymond E. Baldwin
- Preceded by: Guy B. Holt
- Succeeded by: Frank M. Anastasio

Personal details
- Born: March 18, 1901 Naugatuck, Connecticut, U.S.
- Died: April 30, 1966 (aged 65) Washington, D.C., U.S.
- Party: Republican

Joseph Edward Talbot (March 18, 1901 – April 30, 1966) was a U.S. representative from Connecticut.

Born in Naugatuck, Connecticut, Talbot attended the public schools. He was graduated from Dartmouth College, Hanover, New Hampshire, in 1922 and from Yale Law School in 1925. He was admitted to the bar in 1925 and commenced practice in Naugatuck and Waterbury, Connecticut. He served as prosecuting attorney in Naugatuck from 1928 to 1933 and judge from 1935 to 1937. He was State Treasurer, 1939–1941, and workmen's compensation commissioner for the fifth district of Connecticut in 1941 and 1942.

Talbot was elected as a Republican to the Seventy-seventh Congress in a special election to fill the vacancy caused by the resignation of J. Joseph Smith. He was reelected to the Seventy-eighth and Seventy-ninth Congresses and served from January 20, 1942, to January 3, 1947. He was not a candidate for renomination in 1946. He was an unsuccessful candidate for the gubernatorial nomination in 1946 and an unsuccessful candidate for election to the United States Senate in 1950.

He was appointed a member of the United States Tariff Commission in April 1953. He was reappointed in May 1959 and again on July 14, 1965, serving as vice chairman 1953-1959 and as chairman from 1959. He served as chairman of the Committee on Reciprocity Information from 1959 until his death in Washington, D.C., April 30, 1966. He was interred in St. James Cemetery, Naugatuck, Connecticut.

Party political offices
| Preceded by John A. Danaher | Republican nominee for U.S. Senator from Connecticut (Class 3); 1950 | Succeeded by Prescott Bush |
Political offices
| Preceded by Guy B. Holt | Connecticut State Treasurer; 1939–1941 | Succeeded by Frank M. Anastasio |
U.S. House of Representatives
| Preceded by J. Joseph Smith | Member of the U.S. House of Representatives from Connecticut's 5th congressional district 1942–1947 | Succeeded by James T. Patterson |
