= William Benton (politician) =

American politician (1900–1973)

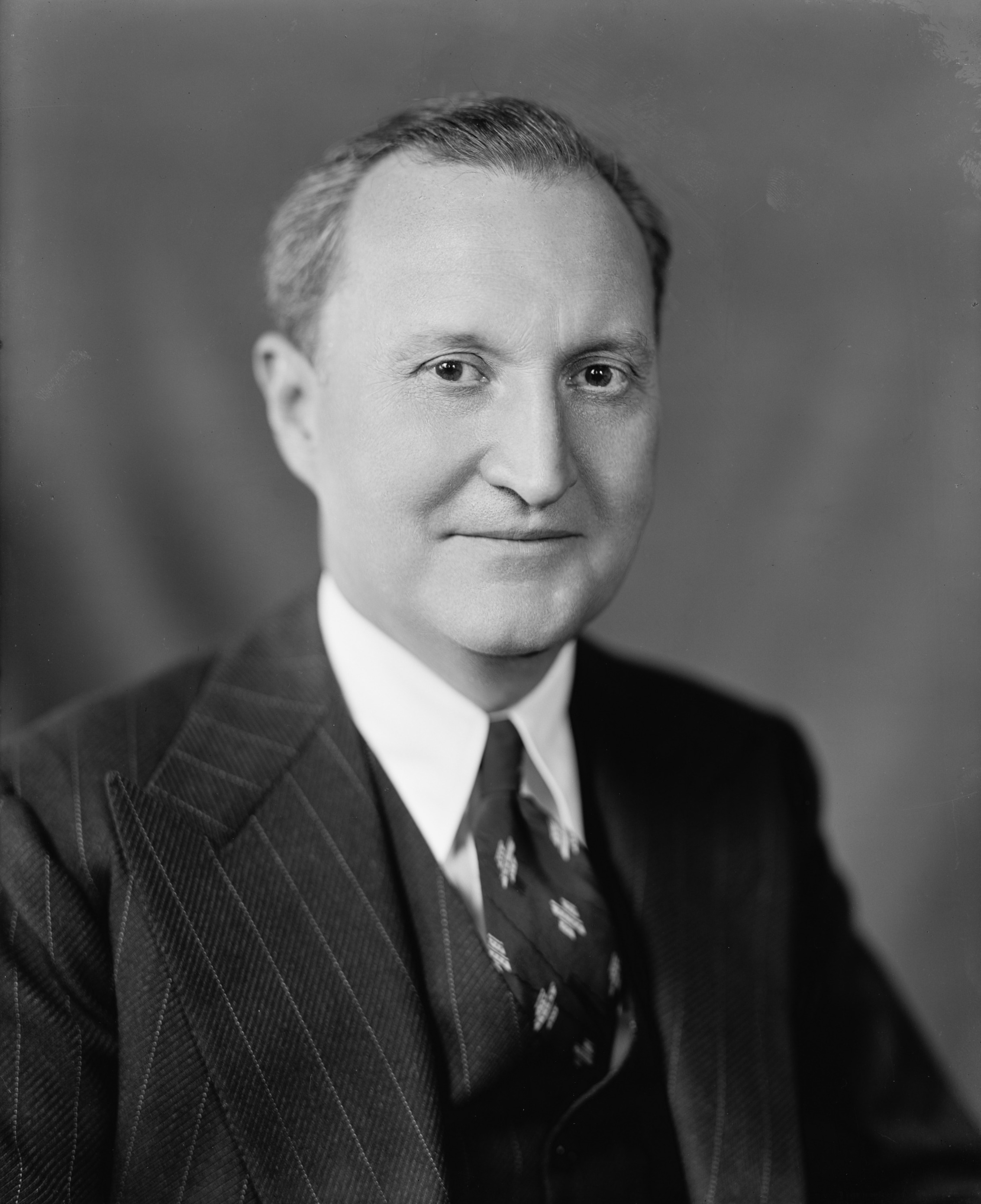
- Benton, 1905–1945

United States Senator from Connecticut
- In office December 17, 1949 – January 3, 1953
- Preceded by: Raymond E. Baldwin
- Succeeded by: William A. Purtell

2nd Assistant Secretary of State for Public Affairs
- In office September 17, 1945 – September 30, 1947
- Preceded by: Archibald MacLeish
- Succeeded by: George V. Allen

Personal details
- Born: William Burnett Benton; April 1, 1900 Minneapolis, Minnesota, U.S.
- Died: March 18, 1973 (aged 72) New York City, U.S.
- Party: Democratic
- Spouse: Helen Hemingway Benton
- Relatives: Mary Lathrop Benton (aunt)
- Education: Carleton College; Yale University

William Burnett Benton (April 1, 1900 – March 18, 1973) was an American senator from Connecticut (1949–1953) and publisher of the Encyclopædia Britannica (1943–1973).

== Early life ==
Benton was born in Minneapolis, Minnesota. He was educated at Shattuck Military Academy, Faribault, Minnesota, and Carleton College in Northfield, Minnesota until 1918, at which point he matriculated at Yale University, where he contributed to campus humor magazine The Yale Record and was admitted to the Zeta Psi fraternity.

== Advertising and civic life ==
He graduated in 1921 and began work for advertising agencies in New York City and Chicago until 1929, after which he co-founded Benton & Bowles with Chester Bowles in New York. He moved to Norwalk, Connecticut in 1932, and served as the part-time vice president of the University of Chicago from 1937 to 1945. In 1944, he had entered into unsuccessful negotiations with Walt Disney to make six to twelve educational films annually.

== Public and elected office life ==
He was appointed Assistant Secretary of State for Public Affairs and held the position from August 31, 1945 to September 30, 1947, during which time he was active in organizing the United Nations. He was appointed to the United States Senate on 17 December 1949 by his old partner Chester Bowles (who had been elected Governor in 1948), and subsequently elected in the special election on 7 November 1950 as a Democrat to fill the vacancy caused by the resignation of Raymond E. Baldwin in December 1949 for the remainder of the term ending 3 January 1953.

In the November 1950 election, he defeated Republican party candidate Prescott Sheldon Bush, father of U.S. President George Herbert Walker Bush and grandfather of U.S. President George W. Bush by 1,102 votes. In 1951 he introduced a resolution to expel Joseph McCarthy from the Senate. Benton provided 30,000 words of testimony on Sept. 28, 1951 in support of Senate Resolution 187. Due to Benton's resolution and McCarthy's response, the Senate Rules committee investigated and criticized both of them but punished neither.

On television, when asked if he would take any action against Benton's reelection bid, McCarthy replied, "I think it will be unnecessary. Little Willie Benton, Connecticut's mental midget keeps on... it will be unnecessary for me or anyone else to do any campaigning against him. He's doing his campaigning against himself." Benton lost in the general election for the full term in 1952 to William A. Purtell. Benton's comeback bid failed in 1958 when, running against Bowles and Thomas Dodd he failed to win the Democratic nomination for the U.S. Senate. He was later appointed United States Ambassador to UNESCO in Paris and served from 1963 to 1968.

Benton served on the board of trustees of the University of Connecticut from 1957 to 1972. Converted to a museum in 1966, the William Benton Museum of Art on the university's main campus in Storrs was named in his honor in 1972. Benton had donated his personal collection of works by Reginald Marsh to the museum.

== Encyclopædia Britannica and further civic life ==
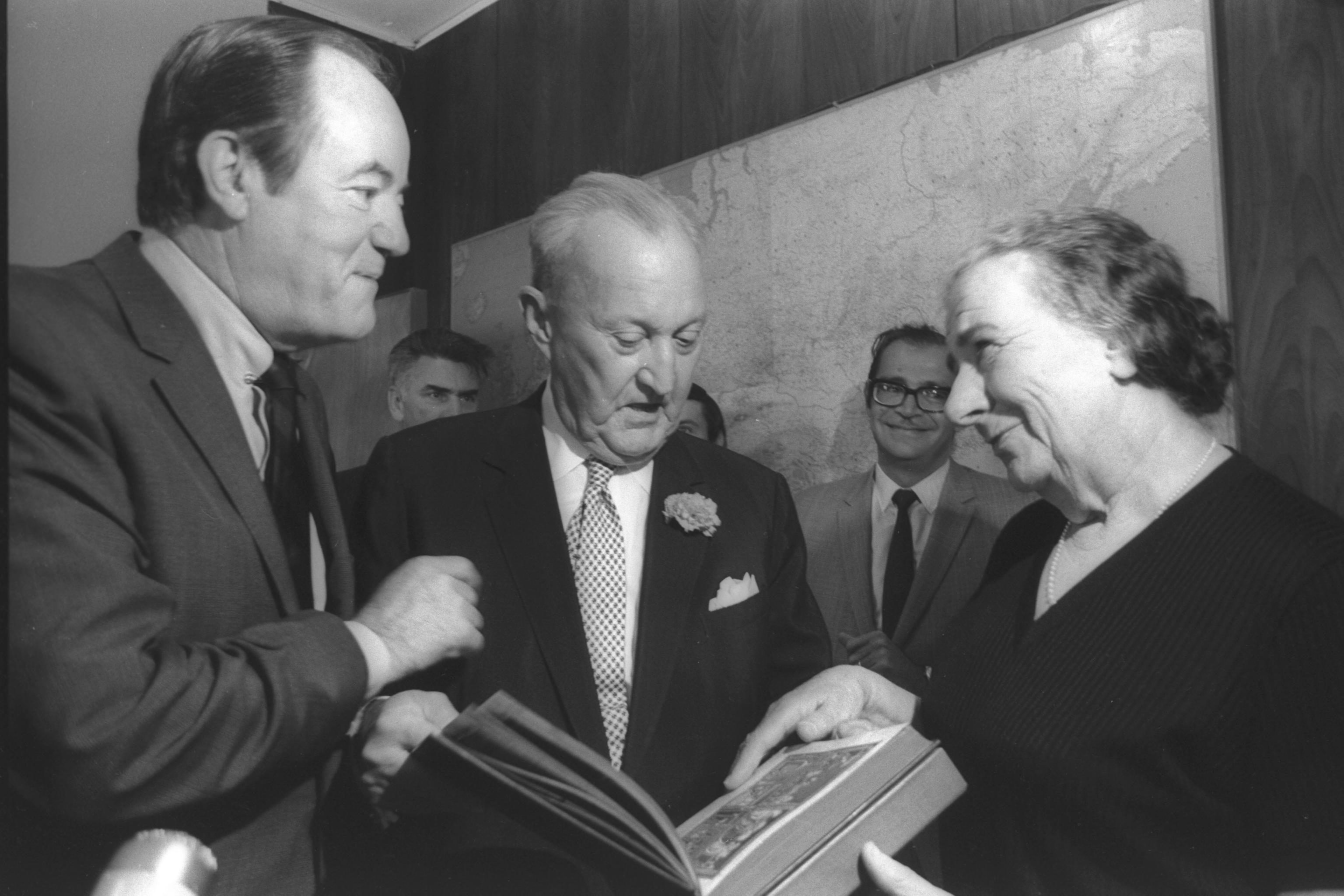
William Benton (C) with Hubert Humphrey and Golda Meir, Jerusalem 1970

For much of his life, from 1943 to his death in 1973, he was chairman of the board and publisher of the Encyclopædia Britannica, was a member of and delegate to numerous United Nations and international conferences and commissions, and trustee of several schools and colleges. In 1943 Benton asked Mortimer J. Adler and Robert Hutchins to edit a set of great books to be published by Encyclopædia Britannica, Inc.; the 52-volume set of Great Books of the Western World was published in 1952.

Benton established the Benton Foundation. The William Benton Museum of Art is named in his honor.

He died in New York City on March 18, 1973, aged 72, and was survived by his widow, Helen Hemingway Benton, who died in 1974.

== See also ==
- Muzak, a company once owned by Benton

== Bibliography ==
- Hyman, Sidney (1970). The Lives of William Benton. Chicago: The University of Chicago Press. ISBN 0-226-36548-4.

Government offices
Preceded by Archibald MacLeish	Assistant Secretary of State for Public Affairs; September 17, 1945 – September 30, 1947	Succeeded by George V. Allen
U.S. Senate
Preceded by Raymond E. Baldwin	U.S. senator (Class 1) from Connecticut; 1949–1953; Served alongside: Brien McMahon, William A. Purtell, Prescott Bush	Succeeded by William A. Purtell
Party political offices
Preceded by Joseph M. Tone	Democratic Party nominee for United States Senator from Connecticut (Class 1); 1950, 1952	Succeeded by Thomas J. Dodd
