= William A. Purtell =

American politician (1897–1978)

Willam Arthur Purtell
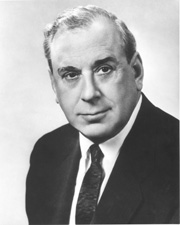

United States Senator from Connecticut
- In office January 3, 1953 – January 3, 1959
- Preceded by: William Benton
- Succeeded by: Thomas J. Dodd
- In office August 29, 1952 – November 4, 1952
- Appointed by: John Davis Lodge
- Preceded by: Brien McMahon
- Succeeded by: Prescott Bush

Personal details
- Born: May 6, 1897 Hartford, Connecticut, U.S.
- Died: May 31, 1978 (aged 81) West Hartford, Connecticut, U.S.
- Party: Republican
- Spouse: Katherine Elizabeth Cassidy

William Arthur Purtell (May 6, 1897 – May 31, 1978) was an American businessman and politician. A member of the Republican Party, he represented Connecticut in the United States Senate in 1952 and from 1953 to 1959.

== Biography ==
William Purtell was born in a tenement neighborhood of Hartford, Connecticut. He was the son of Thomas Michael and Nora Mary (née O'Connor) Purtell, who were tobacco workers. He received his early education at St. Patrick's School, and attended Hartford Public High School for two years before dropping out aged 15. He then worked as a janitor, water boy, and car checker for the New York, New Haven and Hartford Railroad.

During World War I, he served with the radio section of the U.S. Army Expeditionary Force in France, being discharged as a corporal in 1919. That same year, he married Katherine Elizabeth Cassidy; the couple had a son, William, and a daughter, Margaret.

== Business career ==
After working as a salesman for ten years, Purtell co-founded the Holo-Krome Screw Corporation of West Hartford in 1929 and served as its president, treasurer, and general manager until 1952. He also served as president, treasurer, and general manager (1937-1944) and later chairman (1944-1947) of the Billings & Spencer Company of Hartford. From 1938 to 1952, he served as vice-president, treasurer, and general manager of the Sparmal Engineering Corporation. He was also director of the Hartford Red Cross and one of the executive directors of the Connecticut State Prison.

Purtell unsuccessfully ran for the Republican nomination for Governor of Connecticut in 1950, losing to Congressman John Davis Lodge. He was one of the first political leaders in Connecticut to support General Dwight D. Eisenhower in the 1952 presidential election.

== U.S. Senate ==
In May 1952, Purtell won the Republican nomination to challenge Democratic incumbent William Benton for a seat in the United States Senate. However, when Connecticut's other Democratic Senator, Brien McMahon, died in July of that year, Governor Lodge appointed Purtell to the Senate to fill the remainder of McMahon's term. Thus, Purtell was in the unusual position of filling one Senate seat while running for another. Fellow Republican businessman Prescott Bush, the father of George H. W. Bush and grandfather of George W. Bush, was later elected to McMahon's seat. During his campaign against Benton, Purtell supported General Eisenhower's campaign platform on "Communism, corruption, and Korea." Benton accused Purtell of being so conservative that he "makes Bob Taft look like a left-wing New Dealer." Still, Benton was defeated by Purtell by a margin of 88,788 votes, who received 52% of the vote.

During his tenure in the Senate, Purtell co-sponsored an amendment to federal labor laws making discrimination by employers or labor organizations an unfair labor practice. In 1954, he expressed his support for the Eisenhower administration's proposal for a government-conducted vote before a union could go on strike. Purtell voted in favor of the Civil Rights Act of 1957. In 1958, Purtell was defeated for re-election by his Democratic opponent Thomas J. Dodd, a former Congressman and father of future Senator Chris Dodd, by a margin of 57%-42%.

== Later life and death ==
Following his Senate career, Purtell resumed his manufacturing interests. He died at his home in West Hartford, at age 81. He is buried in Fairview Cemetery.

U.S. Senate
Preceded by Brien McMahon	U.S. senator (Class 3) from Connecticut; August 29, 1952 – November 4, 1952; Served alongside: William B. Benton	Succeeded by Prescott Bush
Preceded by William B. Benton	U.S. senator (Class 1) from Connecticut; January 3, 1953 – January 3, 1959; Served alongside: Prescott Bush	Succeeded by Thomas J. Dodd
Party political offices
Preceded by Prescott Bush	Republican nominee for United States Senator from Connecticut (Class 1); 1952, 1958	Succeeded by John Davis Lodge
