= 1956 United States Senate election in Connecticut =

- November 6, 1956
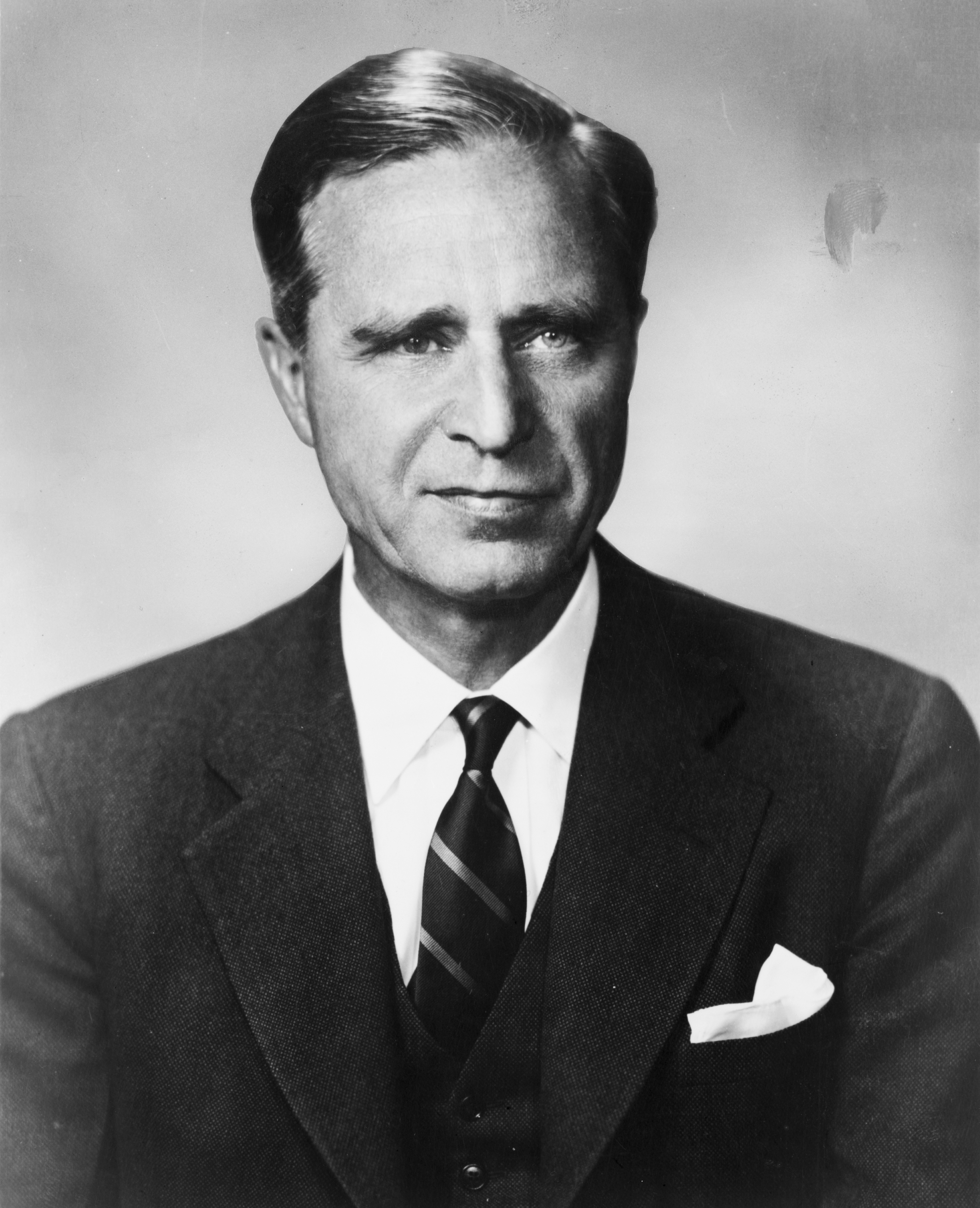

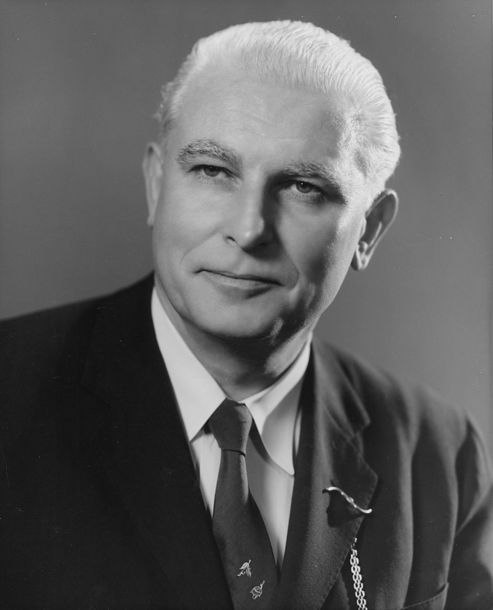
Nominee	Prescott Bush	Thomas J. Dodd
Party	Republican	Democratic
Popular vote	610,829	479,460
Percentage	54.84%	43.05%
- Bush: 40–50% 50–60% 60–70% 70–80% 80–90% Dodd: 40–50% 50–60% 60–70%
U.S. senator before election
Prescott Bush
Republican
Elected U.S. Senator
Prescott Bush
Republican

The 1956 United States Senate election in Connecticut was held on November 6, 1956.

Incumbent Senator Prescott Bush, who won a special election in 1952, was re-elected to a full term in office over Democratic U.S. Representative Thomas J. Dodd. Dodd would later be elected to the state's other Senate seat in 1958. As of 2025, this is the last time that a Republican has been elected to Connecticut's Class 3 Senate seat.

== Democratic nomination ==
=== Candidates ===
- Thomas J. Dodd, U.S. Representative from Hartford

=== Convention ===
Dodd was nominated at the convention on July 7 without opposition.

== General election ==
=== Candidates ===
- Prescott Bush, incumbent Senator since 1952
- Thomas J. Dodd, U.S. Representative from Hartford
- Jasper McLevy, Mayor of Bridgeport since 1933 (Socialist)
- Suzanne S. Stevenson (Independent Republican)

=== Results ===
1956 U.S. Senate election in Connecticut
Party	Candidate	Votes	%
Republican	Prescott Bush (incumbent)	610,829	54.84%
Democratic	Thomas J. Dodd	479,460	43.05%
Independent Republican	Suzanne S. Stevenson	10,199	0.92%
Socialist	Jasper McLevy	7,079	0.64%
Independent	Vivien Kellems (write-in)	6,219	0.56%
Write-in		33	0.00%
Total votes		1,113,819	100.00%
Republican hold			

== See also ==
- 1956 United States Senate elections
