= 1962 United States Senate election in Connecticut =

- November 6, 1962
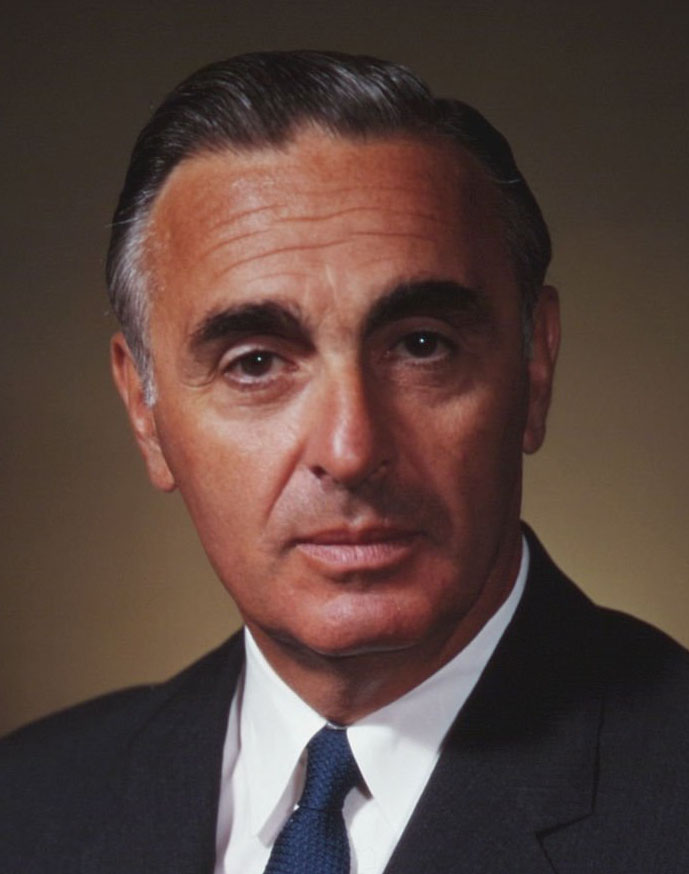

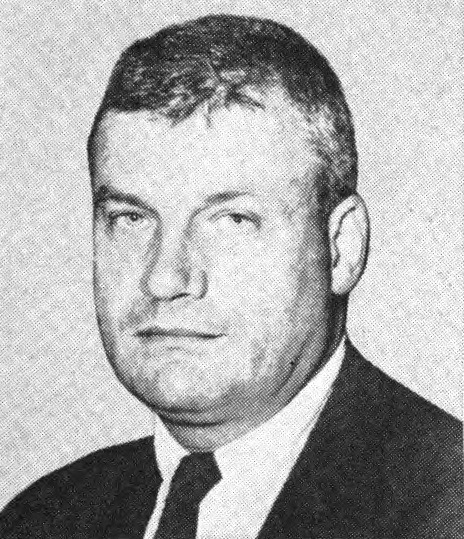
Nominee	Abraham Ribicoff	Horace Seely-Brown Jr.
Party	Democratic	Republican
Popular vote	527,522	501,694
Percentage	51.25%	48.74%
- Ribicoff: 50–60% 60–70% Brown: 50–60% 60–70% 70–80% 80–90%
U.S. senator before election
Prescott Bush
Republican
Elected U.S. Senator
Abraham Ribicoff
Democratic

The 1962 United States Senate election in Connecticut was held on November 6, 1962.

Incumbent Senator Prescott Bush retired instead of seeking a second full term in office. Former Governor of Connecticut and United States Secretary of Health, Education, and Welfare Abraham Ribicoff was elected his successor over Congressman Horace Seely-Brown Jr. Ribicoff had previously sought election to this seat in 1952 but lost to Bush.

== Republican nomination ==
=== Candidates ===
==== Declared ====
- Horace Seely-Brown Jr., U.S. Representative from Connecticut's 2nd congressional district

==== Withdrew ====
- John Davis Lodge, former Governor of Connecticut and United States Ambassador to Spain (following loss at convention)
- Antoni Sadlak, U.S. Representative from Connecticut's at-large congressional district (to manage the Seely-Brown campaign)

=== Results ===
Congressman Horace Seely-Brown Jr. won an upset victory over former Governor John Davis Lodge at the Republican state convention. After two weeks of deliberation, Lodge opted not to seek a primary challenge and Seely-Brown was unopposed for the Republican nomination on the primary ballot.

1962 Connecticut Republican Convention
Party	Candidate	Votes	%
Republican	Horace Seely-Brown	476	76.16%
Republican	John Davis Lodge	149	23.84%
Total votes		625	100.00%

== Democratic convention ==
=== Candidates ===
==== Declared ====
- Abraham Ribicoff, United States Secretary of Health, Education, and Welfare and former Governor of Connecticut

==== Eliminated at convention ====
- Frank Kowalski, U.S. Representative for Connecticut's at-large congressional district

=== Convention results ===
Kowalski fell short of the 190 delegates needed to be eligible for a primary election. Ribicoff was unopposed on the primary ballot.

1962 Connecticut Democratic Convention
Party	Candidate	Votes	%
Democratic	Abraham Ribicoff	786	82.82%
Democratic	Frank Kowalski	163	17.18%
Total votes		949	100.00%

== General election ==
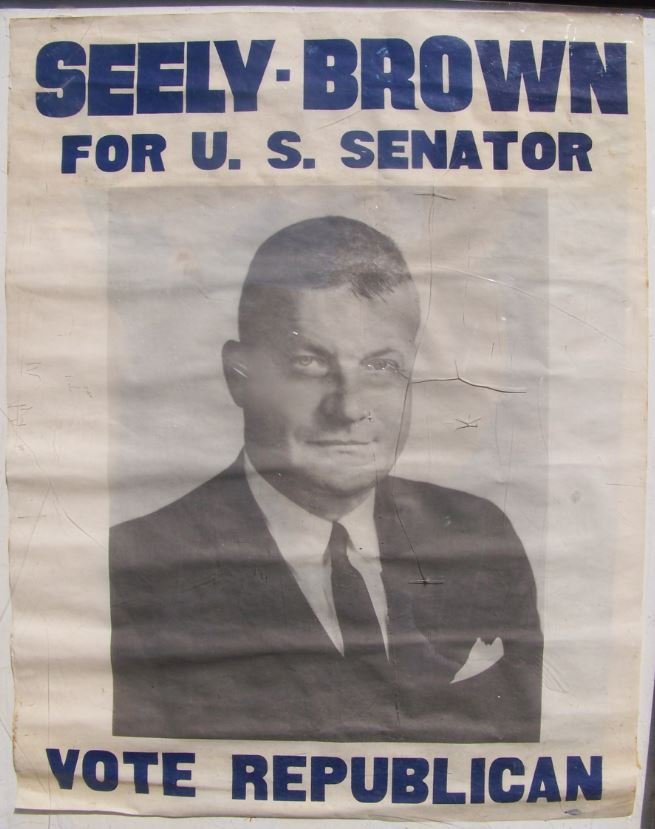
An election poster for Seely-Brown's campaign.

=== Results ===
General election results
Party	Candidate	Votes	%	±%
Democratic	Abraham Ribicoff	527,522	51.26%	▲8.21
Republican	Horace Seely-Brown Jr.	501,694	48.74%	▼6.10
Total votes		1,029,216	100.00%	

== See also ==
- 1962 United States Senate elections
