= 1950 United States Senate election in Connecticut =

- November 7, 1950
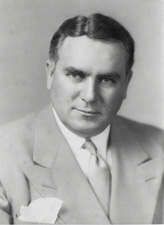

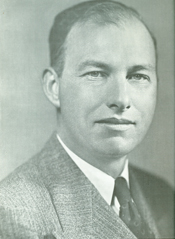
Nominee	Brien McMahon	Joseph E. Talbot
Party	Democratic	Republican
Popular vote	453,646	409,053
Percentage	51.68%	46.60%
- McMahon: 50–60% 60–70% 70–80% Talbot: 50–60% 60–70% 70–80% 80–90% No Data/Vote
U.S. senator before election
Brien McMahon
Democratic
Elected U.S. Senator
Brien McMahon
Democratic

The 1950 United States Senate election in Connecticut was held on November 7, 1950.

Incumbent Democratic Senator Brien McMahon was re-elected to a second term in office over Republican former U.S. Representative Joseph E. Talbot.

== General election ==
=== Candidates ===
- Anthony R. Martino (Socialist)
- Brien McMahon, incumbent Senator since 1945 (Democratic)
- Joseph E. Talbot, former U.S. Representative from Naugatuck and State Treasurer (Republican)

=== Results ===
1950 U.S. Senate election in Connecticut
Party	Candidate	Votes	%	±%
Democratic	Brien McMahon (incumbent)	453,646	51.68%	
Republican	Joseph E. Talbot	409,053	46.60%	
Socialist	Anthony R. Martino	15,128	1.72%	
Total votes		877,827	100.0%	
Democratic hold		Swing		

== See also ==
- 1950 United States Senate elections
