= List of federal judges appointed by Harry S. Truman =

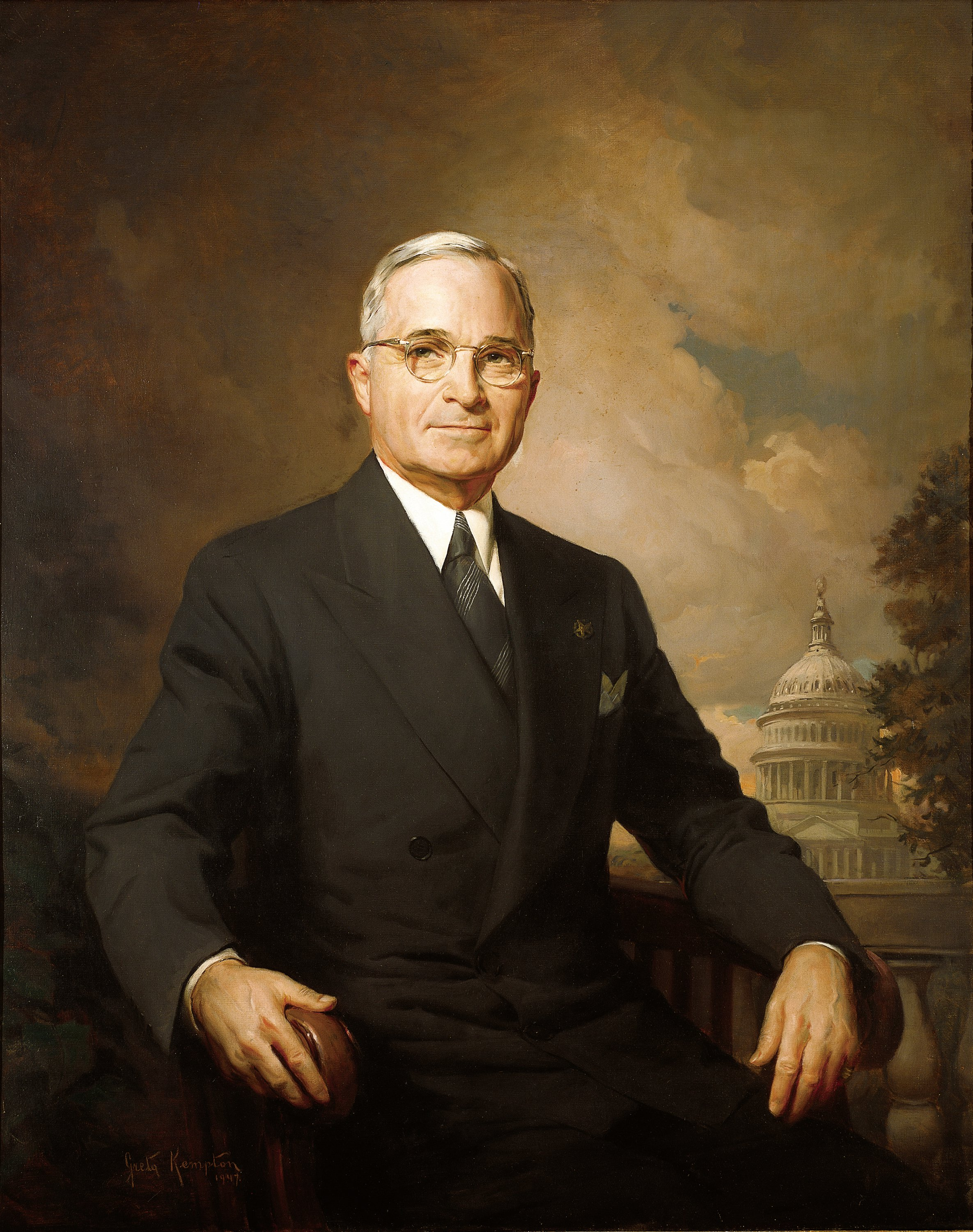
Harry S. Truman

Following is a list of all Article III United States federal judges appointed by President Harry S. Truman during his presidency. In total Truman appointed 133 Article III federal judges, including 4 Justices to the Supreme Court of the United States (including one Chief Justice), 27 judges to the United States Courts of Appeals, and 102 judges to the United States district courts.

Additionally, 9 Article I federal judge appointments are listed, including 3 judges to the United States Court of Customs and Patent Appeals, 2 judges to the United States Court of Claims and 4 judges to the United States Customs Court.

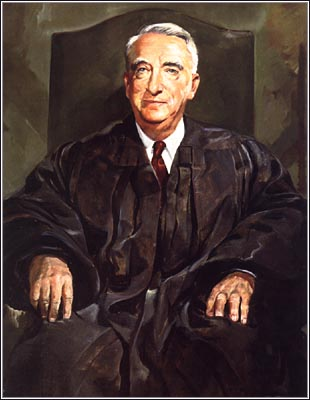
Fred M. Vinson was Truman's pick for Chief Justice of the United States.

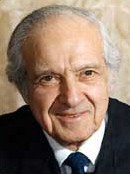
David L. Bazelon of the United States Court of Appeals for the District of Columbia Circuit was Truman's longest-serving appellate appointee, with over 40 years of service.

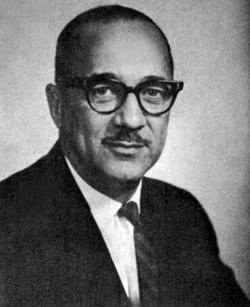
William H. Hastie was the first African American appointed to a United States Court of Appeals, the Third Circuit.

== United States Supreme Court justices ==
#	Justice	Seat	State	Former justice	Nomination date	Confirmation date	Began active service	Ended active service	Ended retired service
1	Harold H. Burton	8	Ohio	Owen Roberts	September 18, 1945	September 19, 1945	September 22, 1945	October 13, 1958	October 28, 1964
2	Fred M. Vinson	Chief	Kentucky	Harlan F. Stone	June 6, 1946	June 20, 1946	June 21, 1946	September 8, 1953	–
3	Tom C. Clark	10	Texas	Frank Murphy	August 2, 1949	August 18, 1949	August 19, 1949	June 12, 1967	June 13, 1977
4	Sherman Minton	3	Indiana	Wiley Blount Rutledge	September 15, 1949	October 4, 1949	October 5, 1949	October 15, 1956	April 9, 1965

== Courts of appeals ==
#	Judge	Circuit	Nomination date	Confirmation date	Began active service	Ended active service	Ended senior status
1	Bennett Champ Clark	D.C.	September 12, 1945	September 24, 1945	September 28, 1945	July 13, 1954	–
2	Wilbur Kingsbury Miller	D.C.	September 12, 1945	September 24, 1945	September 28, 1945	October 15, 1964	January 24, 1976
3	William Edwin Orr	Ninth	September 10, 1945	September 19, 1945	September 28, 1945	January 1, 1956	October 7, 1965
4	E. Barrett Prettyman	D.C.	September 12, 1945	September 24, 1945	September 28, 1945	April 16, 1962	August 4, 1971
5	John Joseph O'Connell	Third	September 12, 1945	October 3, 1945	October 11, 1945	December 16, 1949	–
6	Shackelford Miller Jr.	Sixth	November 23, 1945	December 4, 1945	December 11, 1945	November 1, 1965	November 24, 1965
7	Harry Ellis Kalodner	Third	May 7, 1946 (Note: Initially nominated on May 7, 1946. Nomination withdrawn and renominated on May 21, 1946.)	July 25, 1946	July 27, 1946	October 3, 1969	March 15, 1977
8	John Caskie Collet	Eighth	April 30, 1947	July 8, 1947	July 9, 1947	December 5, 1955	–
9	James McPherson Proctor	D.C.	February 2, 1948	March 2, 1948	March 5, 1948	September 17, 1953	–
10	Harold Montelle Stephens	D.C.	February 2, 1948	March 2, 1948	March 5, 1948	May 28, 1955	–
11	F. Ryan Duffy	Seventh	January 13, 1949	January 31, 1949	February 2, 1949	June 30, 1966	August 16, 1979
12	Walter Lyndon Pope	Ninth	February 14, 1949	February 25, 1949	March 1, 1949	April 1, 1961	March 27, 1969
13	Philip J. Finnegan	Seventh	April 8, 1949	May 3, 1949	May 5, 1949	January 4, 1959	–
14	Walter C. Lindley	Seventh	September 15, 1949	October 12, 1949	October 13, 1949	January 3, 1958	–
15	John Coleman Pickett	Tenth	September 23, 1949	October 12, 1949	October 13, 1949	January 1, 1966	September 1, 1983
16	Wayne G. Borah	Fifth	October 15, 1949	October 19, 1949	October 21, 1949	December 31, 1956	February 6, 1966
17	Robert Lee Russell	Fifth	October 15, 1949	October 19, 1949	October 21, 1949	January 18, 1955	–
18	David L. Bazelon	D.C.	October 15, 1949 (Note: Renominated on January 5, 1950.)	February 8, 1950	October 21, 1949	June 30, 1979	February 19, 1993
19	Charles Fahy	D.C.	October 15, 1949	April 4, 1950	October 21, 1949	April 17, 1967	September 17, 1979
20	William H. Hastie	Third	October 15, 1949	July 19, 1950	October 21, 1949	May 31, 1971	April 14, 1976
21	Hardress Nathaniel Swaim	Seventh	October 15, 1949	February 8, 1950	October 21, 1949	July 30, 1957	–
22	George Thomas Washington	D.C.	October 15, 1949	April 28, 1950	October 21, 1949	November 10, 1965	August 21, 1971
23	Austin Leander Staley	Third	April 27, 1950	June 27, 1950	July 5, 1950	December 31, 1967	August 3, 1978
24	Louie Willard Strum	Fifth	September 14, 1950	September 23, 1950	September 26, 1950	July 26, 1954	–
25	John Patrick Hartigan	First	December 21, 1950	January 2, 1951	January 3, 1951	March 31, 1965	August 10, 1968
26	Richard Rives	Fifth / Eleventh	April 12, 1951	May 1, 1951	May 3, 1951	February 15, 1966	October 27, 1982
27	Harold Medina	Second	June 11, 1951	June 21, 1951	June 23, 1951	March 1, 1958	February 22, 1980

== District courts ==
#	Judge	Court (Note: See List of United States district and territorial courts)	Nomination date	Confirmation date	Began active service	Ended active service	Ended senior status
1	Roger Thomas Foley	D. Nev.	March 30, 1945	April 10, 1945	May 2, 1945	April 1, 1957	October 9, 1974
2	Donnell Gilliam	E.D.N.C.	May 3, 1945	May 15, 1945	May 18, 1945	March 16, 1959	March 6, 1960
3	Dennis F. Donovan	D. Minn.	June 1, 1945	July 17, 1945	July 18, 1945	December 31, 1965	September 16, 1974
4	Arthur A. Koscinski	E.D. Mich.	June 4, 1945	July 17, 1945	July 18, 1945	April 30, 1957	November 21, 1957
5	Alexander Holtzoff	D.D.C.	September 12, 1945	September 24, 1945	September 28, 1945	December 31, 1967	September 6, 1969
6	Ben Herbert Rice Jr.	W.D. Tex.	September 10, 1945	September 19, 1945	September 28, 1945	March 14, 1964	–
7	William Carey Mathes	S.D. Cal.	September 24, 1945	October 11, 1945	October 17, 1945	June 9, 1965	July 24, 1967
8	Thomas M. Madden	D.N.J.	October 9, 1945	October 23, 1945	October 25, 1945	January 1, 1968	March 29, 1976
9	Wallace Samuel Gourley	W.D. Pa.	November 2, 1945	November 20, 1945	November 29, 1945	August 4, 1969	September 23, 1976
10	Arthur Johnson Mellott	D. Kan.	November 13, 1945	November 27, 1945	November 29, 1945	December 29, 1957	–
11	Seybourn Harris Lynne	N.D. Ala.	December 14, 1945	December 20, 1945	January 3, 1946	January 9, 1973	September 10, 2000
12	Edward S. Kampf	N.D.N.Y.	January 17, 1946	February 5, 1946	February 8, 1946	July 1, 1948	–
13	Roy Mahlon Shelbourne	W.D. Ky.	January 17, 1946	February 5, 1946	February 8, 1946	November 1, 1964	December 29, 1974
14	Francis Muir Scarlett	S.D. Ga.	January 24, 1946	February 13, 1946	February 14, 1946	August 2, 1968	November 18, 1971
15	Jacob Weinberger	S.D. Cal.	January 24, 1946	February 15, 1946	February 21, 1946	November 1, 1958	May 20, 1974
16	Samuel Marion Driver	E.D. Wash.	March 12, 1946	April 9, 1946	April 13, 1946	September 12, 1958	–
17	Howard C. Speakman	D. Ariz.	March 27, 1946	April 9, 1946	April 13, 1946	June 17, 1952	–
18	John W. Murphy	M.D. Pa.	May 7, 1946	May 21, 1946	May 27, 1946	March 28, 1962	–
19	George Bernard Harris	N.D. Cal.	June 18, 1946	June 29, 1946	July 9, 1946	July 31, 1970	October 18, 1983
20	Raymond Wesley Starr	W.D. Mich.	July 3, 1946	July 23, 1946	July 25, 1946	August 15, 1961	November 2, 1968
21	Theodore Levin	E.D. Mich.	July 3, 1946	July 25, 1946	July 27, 1946	December 31, 1970	–
22	Richard Seymour Rodney	D. Del.	July 25, 1946	July 27, 1946	July 31, 1946	January 1, 1957	December 22, 1963
23	Frederick Voris Follmer	E.D. Pa. M.D. Pa. W.D. Pa.	July 31, 1946	July 31, 1946	August 7, 1946	June 1, 1955; December 30, 1967; June 1, 1955	– May 3, 1971 –
24	James P. McGranery	E.D. Pa.	July 31, 1946	July 31, 1946	August 7, 1946	May 26, 1952	–
25	Richmond Bowling Keech	D.D.C.	January 8, 1947	January 22, 1947	October 14, 1946	November 1, 1966	April 13, 1986
26	Edward Matthew Curran	D.D.C.	January 8, 1947	February 3, 1947	October 16, 1946	April 2, 1971	January 10, 1988
27	Dal Millington Lemmon	N.D. Cal.	January 17, 1947	February 5, 1947	February 7, 1947	May 3, 1954	Elevated
28	John David Clifford Jr.	D. Me.	January 10, 1947	March 14, 1947	March 24, 1947	November 18, 1956	–
29	Albert Vickers Bryan	E.D. Va.	May 15, 1947	June 3, 1947	June 5, 1947	August 23, 1961	Elevated
30	R. Ewing Thomason	W.D. Tex.	April 24, 1947	June 3, 1947	June 5, 1947	June 1, 1963	November 8, 1973
31	Harold Medina	S.D.N.Y.	May 15, 1947	June 18, 1947	June 20, 1947	June 23, 1951	Elevated
32	Joseph Brannon Dooley	N.D. Tex.	January 8, 1947	July 8, 1947	July 9, 1947	October 1, 1966	January 19, 1967
33	Leo F. Rayfiel	E.D.N.Y.	June 30, 1947	July 23, 1947	July 30, 1947	March 4, 1966	November 18, 1978
34	Roy Winfield Harper	E.D. Mo. W.D. Mo.	July 10, 1947 (Note: Renominated on November 24, 1947.)	–	August 7, 1947	December 19, 1947	–
34.1	Roy Winfield Harper	E.D. Mo. W.D. Mo.	–	–	December 20, 1947	June 20, 1948	–
34.2	Roy Winfield Harper	E.D. Mo. W.D. Mo.	January 13, 1949	January 31, 1949	June 22, 1948	January 5, 1971	February 13, 1994
35	Sylvester J. Ryan	S.D.N.Y.	November 24, 1947	December 18, 1947	November 1, 1947	January 3, 1973	April 10, 1981
36	Herbert William Christenberry	E.D. La.	July 11, 1947	December 18, 1947	December 20, 1947	October 5, 1975	–
37	Samuel H. Kaufman	S.D.N.Y.	May 17, 1948 (Note: Renominated on July 29, 1948 and January 13, 1949.)	January 31, 1949	June 22, 1948	July 31, 1955	May 5, 1960
38	Edward Allen Tamm	D.D.C.	February 3, 1948	March 29, 1949	June 22, 1948	March 16, 1965	Elevated
39	David Ezekiel Henderson	W.D.N.C.	–	–	September 1, 1948	February 14, 1949	–
40	Carl Hatch	D.N.M.	January 13, 1949	January 17, 1949	January 21, 1949	April 5, 1963	September 15, 1963
41	James Thomas Foley	N.D.N.Y.	January 13, 1949	January 31, 1949	February 2, 1949	June 30, 1980	August 17, 1990
42	William T. McCarthy	D. Mass.	January 13, 1949	January 31, 1949	February 2, 1949	May 31, 1960	April 6, 1964
43	Thomas Patrick Thornton	E.D. Mich.	January 13, 1949	January 31, 1949	February 2, 1949	February 15, 1966	July 1, 1985
44	Wilson Warlick	W.D.N.C.	April 2, 1948 (Note: Renominated on January 13, 1949.)	January 31, 1949	February 2, 1949	June 24, 1968	January 30, 1978
45	Herbert Wilson Erskine	N.D. Cal.	January 13, 1949	February 25, 1949	March 1, 1949	March 18, 1951	–
46	William Daniel Murray	D. Mont.	April 5, 1949	May 4, 1949	May 9, 1949	December 31, 1965	October 3, 1994
47	Robert Emmet Tehan	E.D. Wis.	April 5, 1949	May 17, 1949	May 19, 1949	June 30, 1971	November 27, 1975
48	Abraham Benjamin Conger	M.D. Ga.	May 19, 1949	June 2, 1949	June 6, 1949	December 9, 1953	–
49	James V. Allred	S.D. Tex.	September 23, 1949	October 12, 1949	October 13, 1949	September 24, 1959	–
50	Ben Clarkson Connally	S.D. Tex.	September 23, 1949	October 12, 1949	October 13, 1949	December 28, 1974	December 2, 1975
51	Casper Platt	E.D. Ill.	September 15, 1949	October 12, 1949	October 13, 1949	September 16, 1965	–
52	James Marshall Carter	S.D. Cal.	September 23, 1949	October 15, 1949	October 18, 1949	December 1, 1967	Elevated
53	Ernest W. Gibson Jr.	D. Vt.	September 15, 1949	October 15, 1949	October 18, 1949	November 4, 1969	–
54	Harry Clay Westover	S.D. Cal.	September 23, 1949	October 15, 1949	October 18, 1949	December 31, 1965	April 14, 1983
55	M. Neil Andrews	N.D. Ga.	October 15, 1949	–	October 21, 1949	October 31, 1950	–
56	Owen McIntosh Burns	W.D. Pa.	October 15, 1949	March 8, 1950	October 21, 1949	October 26, 1952	–
57	Thomas James Clary	E.D. Pa.	October 15, 1949	March 8, 1950	October 21, 1949	March 1, 1969	August 1, 1977
58	Delmas Carl Hill	D. Kan.	October 15, 1949	March 8, 1950	October 21, 1949	September 28, 1961	Elevated
59	James Robert Kirkland	D.D.C.	October 15, 1949	March 8, 1950	October 21, 1949	February 25, 1958	–
60	John F. X. McGohey	S.D.N.Y.	October 15, 1949	March 8, 1950	October 21, 1949	March 17, 1970	July 7, 1972
61	J. Skelly Wright	E.D. La.	October 15, 1949	March 8, 1950	October 21, 1949	April 15, 1962	Elevated
62	Frank Arthur Hooper	N.D. Ga.	October 15, 1949	February 21, 1950	October 21, 1949	June 29, 1967	February 11, 1985
63	Charles F. McLaughlin	D.D.C.	October 15, 1949	February 27, 1950	October 21, 1949	December 31, 1964	February 5, 1976
64	Gregory Francis Noonan	S.D.N.Y.	October 15, 1949	April 25, 1950	October 21, 1949	May 1, 1964	–
65	Willis William Ritter	D. Utah	August 25, 1949	June 29, 1950	October 21, 1949	March 4, 1978	–
66	Gus J. Solomon	D. Ore.	October 15, 1949	June 27, 1950	October 21, 1949	September 1, 1971	February 15, 1987
67	Carroll O. Switzer	S.D. Iowa	October 15, 1949	–	October 21, 1949	August 9, 1950	–
68	Allan Kuhn Grim	E.D. Pa.	October 15, 1949	April 4, 1950	October 21, 1949	November 1, 1961	December 7, 1965
69	Irving Kaufman	S.D.N.Y.	October 15, 1949	April 4, 1950	October 21, 1949	September 22, 1961	Elevated
70	Burnita Shelton Matthews	D.D.C.	October 15, 1949	April 4, 1950	October 21, 1949	March 1, 1968	April 25, 1988
71	Sidney Sugarman	S.D.N.Y.	October 15, 1949	April 28, 1950	October 21, 1949	June 30, 1971	August 9, 1974
72	Robert Love Taylor	E.D. Tenn.	January 5, 1950	March 8, 1950	November 2, 1949	January 15, 1984	July 11, 1987
73	George William Whitehurst	N.D. Fla. S.D. Fla.	January 30, 1950	February 21, 1950	February 23, 1950	June 30, 1961	January 13, 1974
74	William Lee Knous	D. Colo.	March 1, 1950	April 4, 1950	April 7, 1950	December 12, 1959	–
75	William Elwood Steckler	S.D. Ind.	February 14, 1950	April 4, 1950	April 7, 1950	December 31, 1986	March 8, 1995
76	Rabe Ferguson Marsh Jr.	W.D. Pa.	March 27, 1950	June 2, 1950	June 8, 1950	January 31, 1977	April 19, 1993
77	William Robert Wallace	E.D. Okla. N.D. Okla. W.D. Okla.	April 17, 1950	June 2, 1950	June 8, 1950	June 24, 1960	–
78	Edward Weinfeld	S.D.N.Y.	July 10, 1950	August 1, 1950	August 5, 1950	January 17, 1988	–
79	John Milton Bryan Simpson	S.D. Fla. / M.D. Fla.	September 14, 1950	September 23, 1950	September 26, 1950	November 22, 1966	Elevated
80	William Matthew Byrne Sr.	S.D. Cal. / E.D. Cal.	September 1, 1950 (Note: Renominated on November 27, 1950.)	December 13, 1950	September 27, 1950	June 30, 1966	March 9, 1974
81	Oliver Jesse Carter	N.D. Cal.	September 1, 1950	December 13, 1950	September 27, 1950	April 7, 1976	June 14, 1976
82	Walter M. Bastian	D.D.C.	November 27, 1950	December 14, 1950	October 23, 1950	December 15, 1954	Elevated
83	Edward Preston Murphy	N.D. Cal.	December 4, 1950	December 13, 1950	December 21, 1950	December 13, 1958	–
84	William F. Riley	S.D. Iowa	November 29, 1950	December 14, 1950	December 27, 1950	December 29, 1956	–
85	Edward L. Leahy	D.R.I.	December 21, 1950	January 2, 1951	January 3, 1951	July 22, 1953	–
86	Alfred Egidio Modarelli	D.N.J.	November 29, 1950	January 2, 1951	January 3, 1951	September 22, 1957	–
87	Charles Joseph McNamee	N.D. Ohio	February 8, 1951	March 6, 1951	March 9, 1951	May 2, 1964	–
88	Daniel Holcombe Thomas	S.D. Ala.	January 29, 1951	March 6, 1951	March 9, 1951	August 25, 1971	April 13, 2000
89	William Boyd Sloan	N.D. Ga.	February 19, 1951	March 20, 1951	March 23, 1951	August 1, 1965	October 22, 1970
90	William James Lindberg	E.D. Wash. W.D. Wash.	March 12, 1951	April 24, 1951	April 25, 1951	May 19, 1961; March 1, 1971	– December 15, 1981
91	William Alvah Stewart	W.D. Pa.	February 27, 1951	April 24, 1951	April 25, 1951	April 9, 1953	–
92	Joseph Warren Sheehy	E.D. Tex.	May 16, 1951	June 7, 1951	June 8, 1951	February 23, 1967	–
93	Thomas Francis Murphy	S.D.N.Y.	June 11, 1951	June 29, 1951	July 2, 1951	December 3, 1970	October 26, 1995
94	Edward Jordan Dimock	S.D.N.Y.	June 11, 1951	July 10, 1951	July 11, 1951	July 28, 1961	March 17, 1986
95	Joseph Sam Perry	N.D. Ill.	July 13, 1951	August 21, 1951	August 22, 1951	November 29, 1971	February 18, 1984
96	Luther Youngdahl	D.D.C.	July 6, 1951	August 28, 1951	August 29, 1951	May 29, 1966	June 21, 1978
97	Richard Hartshorne	D.N.J.	October 17, 1951	October 19, 1951	October 20, 1951	October 29, 1961	September 14, 1975
98	Ernest Allen Tolin	S.D. Cal.	October 18, 1951 (Note: Renominated on March 3, 1952.)	June 10, 1952	October 30, 1951	June 11, 1961	–
99	David Norton Edelstein	S.D.N.Y.	January 30, 1952	April 7, 1952	November 1, 1951	November 1, 1994	August 19, 2000
100	Ashton Hilliard Williams	E.D.S.C.	June 17, 1952	July 2, 1952	July 3, 1952	February 25, 1962	–
101	James Augustine Walsh	D. Ariz.	July 3, 1952	July 5, 1952	July 7, 1952	July 9, 1976	May 2, 1991
102	Monroe Mark Friedman	N.D. Cal.	June 27, 1952 (Note: Renominated on January 9, 1953. Withdrawn by President Eisenhower on July 24, 1953.)	–	July 17, 1952	August 3, 1953	–

== Specialty courts (Article I) ==
=== United States Court of Customs and Patent Appeals ===
#	Judge	Nomination date	Confirmation date	Began active service	Ended active service	Ended senior status
1	Noble J. Johnson	May 28, 1948	June 8, 1948	June 10, 1948	July 19, 1956	–
2	Eugene Worley	February 24, 1950	March 8, 1950	March 9, 1950	April 30, 1959	–
3	William Purington Cole Jr.	July 4, 1952	July 5, 1952	July 7, 1952	September 22, 1957	–

=== United States Court of Claims ===
#	Judge	Nomination date	Confirmation date	Began active service	Ended active service	Ended senior status
1	John Marvin Jones	January 20, 1947	July 8, 1947	July 9, 1947	July 14, 1964	March 4, 1976
2	George Evan Howell	July 18, 1947	July 23, 1947	July 30, 1947	September 30, 1953	–

=== United States Customs Court ===
#	Judge	Nomination date	Confirmation date	Began active service	Ended active service	Ended senior status
1	Irvin C. Mollison	October 3, 1945	October 26, 1945	October 29, 1945	May 5, 1962	–
2	Jed Johnson	April 7, 1947 (Note: Initially nominated on March 29, 1945 by President Roosevelt to a different seat on the same court. Nomination confirmed on April 3, 1945, but Johnson declined the appointment. Renominated to a different seat on the same court by President Truman on April 7, 1947.)	June 23, 1947	June 25, 1947	May 8, 1963	–
3	Paul Peter Rao	June 22, 1948	January 31, 1949	June 22, 1948	November 30, 1988	–
4	Morgan Ford	June 22, 1949	July 12, 1949	July 15, 1949	December 31, 1985	January 2, 1992

== Notes ==
Renominations

== Sources ==
- Federal Judicial Center
