= Tamm (surname) =

Family name

Tamm is a surname.

"Tamm" is one of the most common surnames in Estonia. The word "tamm" in Estonian means "oak".

People with the surname Tamm include:

- Aino Tamm (1864–1945), Estonian singer and pedagogue
- Aldo Tamm (born 1953), Estonian politician
- Alex Matthias Tamm (born 2001), Estonian footballer
- Alfhild Tamm (1876–1959), Swedish physician, psychiatrist and psychoanalyst
- Edward Allen Tamm (1906–1985), American FBI agent and federal judge (brother of Quinn Tamm)
- Fabian Tamm (1879–1955), Swedish admiral
- Hugo Tamm (1903–1990), Swedish diplomat
- Igor Tamm (1895–1971), Soviet physicist, 1958 Nobel Prize for Physics
- Ilmar Tamm (born 1972), Estonian Brigadier General
- Jaak Tamm (1950–1999), Estonian politician and businessman
- Joonas Tamm (born 1992), Estonian footballer
- Jüri Tamm (1957–2021), Estonian hammer thrower
- Kiiri Tamm (born 1962), Estonian actress
- Kristjan Tamm (born 1998), Estonian tennis player
- Marek Tamm (born 1973), Estonian historian and professor of cultural history
- Mary Tamm (1950–2012), British actress
- Peter Tamm (1928–2016), German journalist and collector
- Quinn Tamm (1910–1986), American FBI agent and jurist (brother of Edward Allen Tamm)
- Raivo E. Tamm (born 1965) Estonian actor
- Ralph Tamm (born 1966), American football player
- Reimo Tamm (born 1984), Estonian basketball player
- Riin Tamm (born 1981), Estonian geneticist
- Sebastian Tamm (1889–1962), Swedish rower
- Tarmo Tamm (born 1953), Estonian politician
- Tarmo Tamm (born 1966), Estonian entrepreneur and politician
- Thomas Tamm (born 1952), American whistleblower
- Tiit Tamm (born 1952), Estonian ski jumper and coach
- Väino Tamm (1930–1986), Estonian interior designer and professor
- Viking Tamm (1896–1975), Swedish Army officer
