= Samuel Estreicher =

American academic (born 1948)

- Born: 1948 (age 77–78); Bergen-Belsen displaced persons camp, Germany
- Education: Columbia University (BA, JD); Cornell University (MS)
- Scientific career
- Fields: Labor law, Employment law
- Workplaces: New York University School of Law

Samuel Estreicher (born 1948) is Dwight D. Opperman Professor of Public Law at New York University School of Law, Director of its Center for Labor and Employment and Director of its Institute of Judicial Administration. He has published dozens of articles and several books on labor law, employment law, employment discrimination law, U.S. foreign relations law, international law, and Supreme Court decision-making.

== Biography ==
Born in the displaced-persons camp at Bergen-Belsen, Germany, in 1948, Estreicher and his parents came to the U.S. two years later, first in Allentown PA, ultimately settling in the Bronx, New York. Estreicher graduated from Brooklyn Technical High School in 1966. He received his A.B. from Columbia College in 1970, his M.S. (Industrial Relations & Labor History) from Cornell University in 1974 and his J.D. from Columbia Law School the following year. At Columbia, he was editor-in-chief of the Columbia Law Review.

After law school Estreicher clerked for the late Harold Leventhal of the United States Court of Appeals for the District of Columbia Circuit, practiced with a union-side law firm, and then clerked for the late Lewis F. Powell, Jr. of the United States Supreme Court. In 1978 Estreicher joined the faculty of New York University School of Law, where he teaches labor and employment law, employment discrimination law, appellate advocacy, legislation and the regulatory state, foreign relations law. seminars in international law.

Estreicher is the former Secretary of the Labor and Employment Law Section of the American Bar Association, a former chair of the Committee on Labor and Employment Law of the Association of the Bar for the City of New York, and chief reporter of the new Restatement of Employment Law (published by the American Law Institute in July 2015). He has lectured at Columbia Law, UCLA, Chicago-Kent, Case Western and Cleveland State law schools, testified before Congress and the Commission on the Future of U.S. Worker-Management Relations, and organized dozens of workshops for federal and state judges, U.S. Department of Labor lawyers, NLRB lawyers, EEOC lawyers, court law clerks, employment mediators and practitioners generally.

Estreicher is a member of the arbitration/mediation panels of the American Arbitration Association and Center for Public Resources, and is a Fellow of the College of Labor and Employment Lawyers. In 2010, the Labor and Employment Relations Association (successor to the Industrial Relations Research Association) awarded Estreicher its Susan C. Eaton Award for Outstanding Scholar-Practitioner of the year.

Estreicher has been counsel to a number of major law firms, including Jones Day. Morgan Lewis, O'Melveny & Myers, and Cahill Gordon. He also maintains an active appellate practice.

In 2017, Estreicher was appointed by the UN Secretary General to serve as a member of the UN's Internal Justice Council for a 4-year term.

Estreicher is married to Abby F. Burman. His late wife was Aleta G. Estreicher, married from 1969 until her death in 2020. He has two children, Michael Simon Estreicher and Hannah Rose Estreicher, and two grandchildren.

== See also ==
- List of law clerks for the first seat of the Supreme Court of the United States
