= Judge Edgerton =

Judge Edgerton may refer to:

- Alonzo J. Edgerton (1827–1896), judge of the United States District Court for the District of South Dakota
- Henry White Edgerton (1888–1970), judge of the United States Court of Appeals for the District of Columbia Circuit
