= Harold Leventhal (judge) =

American judge (1915–1979)

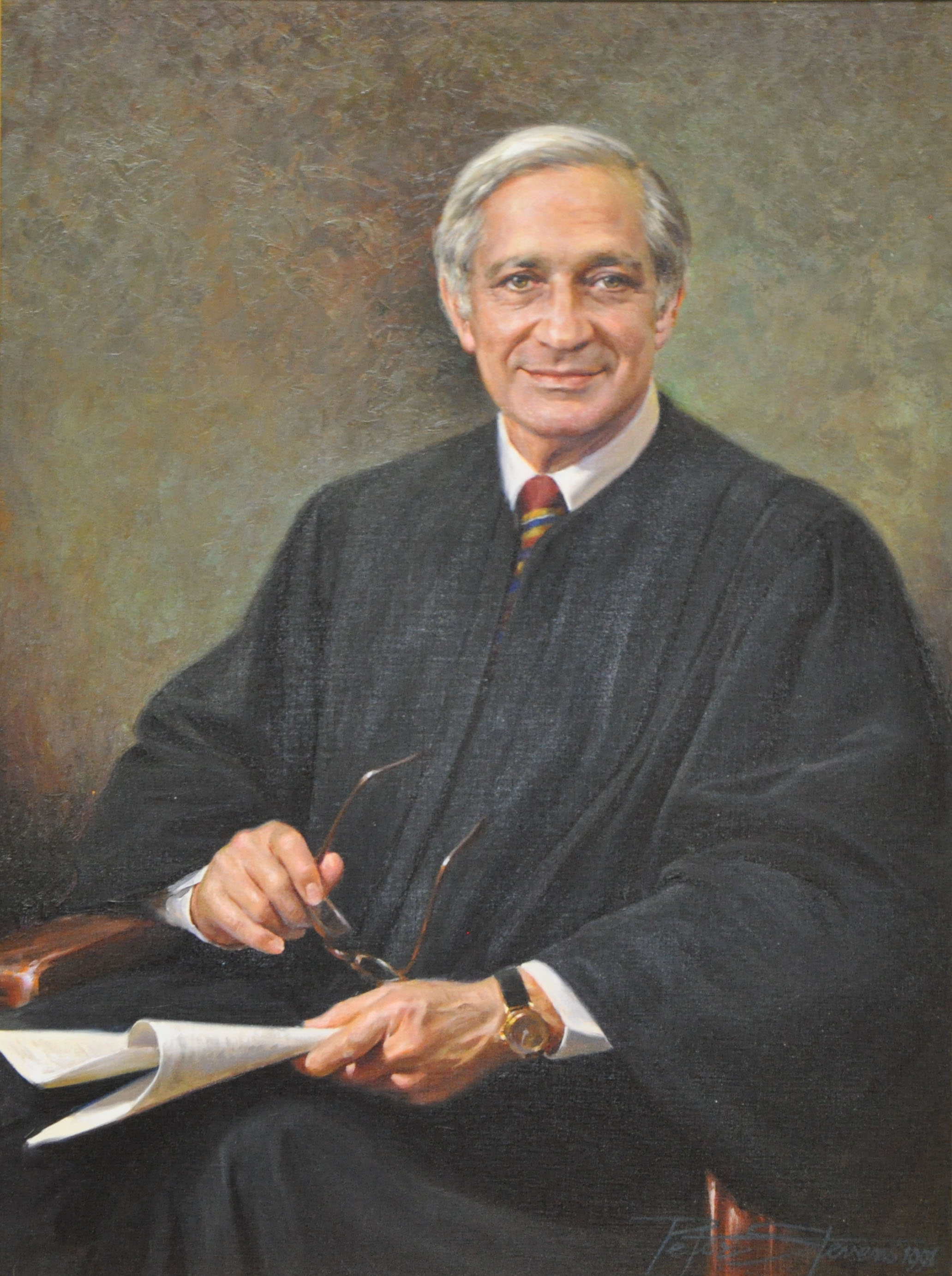
- Official portrait, 1991

Judge of the United States Court of Appeals for the District of Columbia Circuit
- In office April 7, 1965 – November 20, 1979
- Nominated by: Lyndon B. Johnson
- Preceded by: Wilbur Kingsbury Miller
- Succeeded by: Ruth Bader Ginsburg

Personal details
- Born: January 5, 1915 New York City, New York, U.S.
- Died: November 20, 1979 (aged 64)
- Education: Columbia University (AB, LLB)

Harold Leventhal (January 5, 1915 – November 20, 1979) was a United States circuit judge of the United States Court of Appeals for the District of Columbia Circuit.

== Education and career ==
Leventhal was born in New York City, New York. He received an Artium Baccalaureus degree from Columbia University in 1934. He received a Bachelor of Laws from Columbia Law School in 1936, where he was editor-in-chief of the Columbia Law Review. He was a law clerk for United States Supreme Court justices Harlan Fiske Stone (1937-1938) and Stanley Forman Reed (1938). He was an Attorney for the Office of the Solicitor General of the United States from 1937 to 1938 and from 1938 to 1939. He was a Chief of Litigation for the Bituminous Coal Division of the United States Department of the Interior from 1939 to 1940. He was assistant general counsel for the Office of Price Administration from 1940 to 1943. He was a United States Coast Guard Reserve Lieutenant Commander from 1943 to 1946. He served on the staff of Justice Robert H. Jackson during the Nuremberg Trials from 1945 to 1946. He then returned to his position as assistant general counsel for the Office of Price Administration in 1946. He was in private practice of law in Washington, D.C. from 1946 to 1951, before returning to the Office of Price Administration as chief counsel from 1951 to 1952. He was in private practice of law in Washington, D.C. from 1952 to 1965.

== Federal judicial service ==
Leventhal was nominated by President Lyndon B. Johnson on March 1, 1965, to a seat on the United States Court of Appeals for the District of Columbia Circuit vacated by Judge Wilbur Kingsbury Miller. He was confirmed by the United States Senate on April 7, 1965, and received his commission on April 7, 1965. His service terminated on November 20, 1979, due to his death. He was succeeded by Judge Ruth Bader Ginsburg.

== Law clerks ==
- David M. Becker, SEC General Counsel
- Samuel Estreicher, NYU Law Professor
- Judith A. Miller, Department of Defense General Counsel

== See also ==
- List of law clerks for the sixth seat of the Supreme Court of the United States
- List of law clerks for the ninth seat of the Supreme Court of the United States
- List of Jewish American jurists

Legal offices
Preceded by Wilbur Kingsbury Miller	Judge of the United States Court of Appeals for the District of Columbia Circuit; 1965–1979	Succeeded by Ruth Bader Ginsburg
