= William Hitz =

American judge

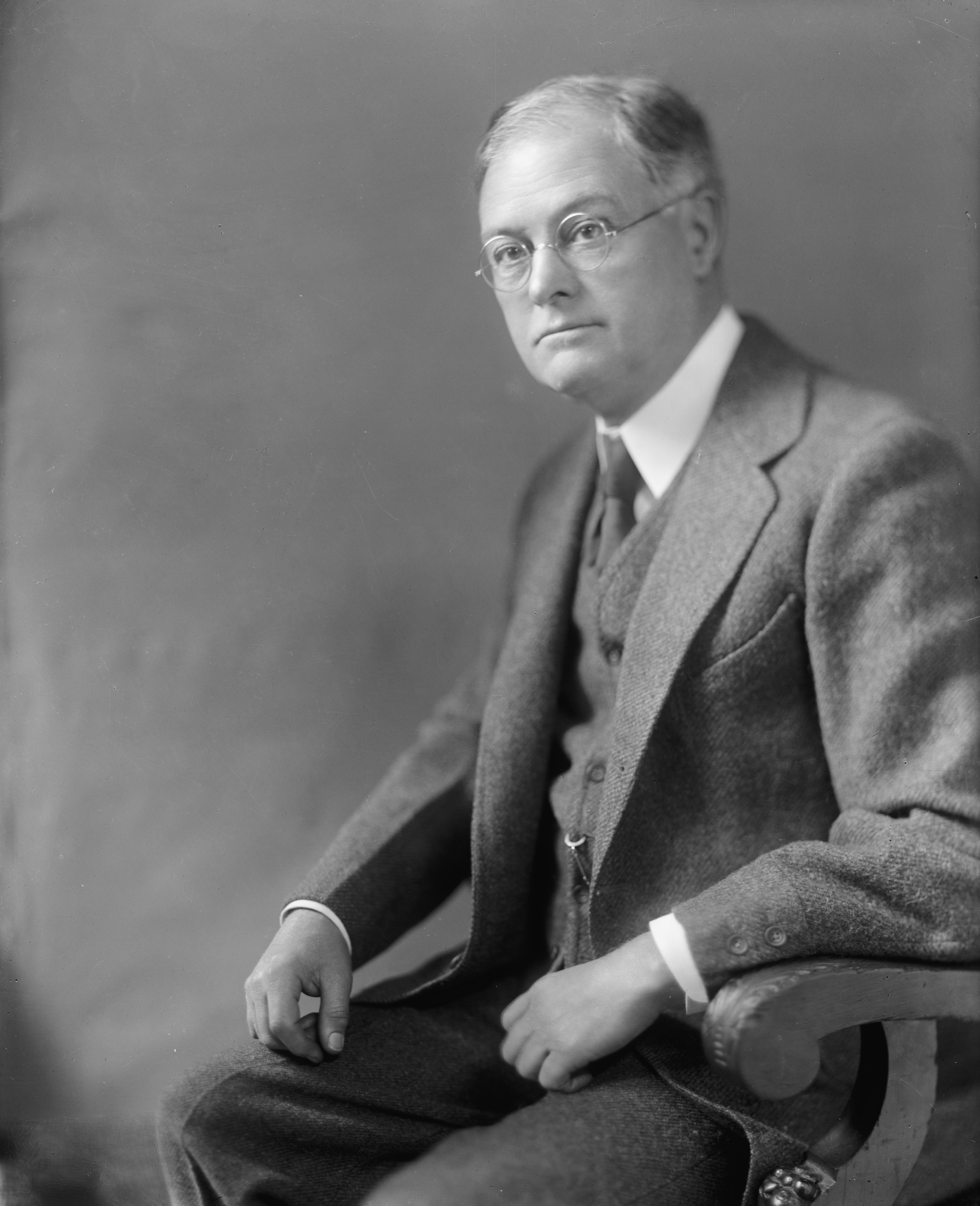

Associate Justice of the United States Court of Appeals for the District of Columbia
- In office February 6, 1931 – July 3, 1935
- Appointed by: Herbert Hoover
- Preceded by: Seat established by 46 Stat. 785
- Succeeded by: Harold Montelle Stephens

Associate Justice of the Supreme Court of the District of Columbia
- In office November 15, 1916 – February 13, 1931
- Appointed by: Woodrow Wilson
- Preceded by: Thomas H. Anderson
- Succeeded by: James McPherson Proctor

Personal details
- Born: William Hitz; April 21, 1872 Washington, D.C.
- Died: July 3, 1935 (aged 63)
- Education: Harvard University; Georgetown Law (LLB)

William Hitz (April 21, 1872 – July 3, 1935), known as Billy Hitz, was an Associate Justice of the United States Court of Appeals for the District of Columbia and previously was an associate justice of the Supreme Court of the District of Columbia.

== Education and career ==
Born in Washington, D.C., Hitz received his undergraduate education from Harvard University, and received a Bachelor of Laws from Georgetown Law in 1900. He was in private practice in Washington, D.C. from 1900 to 1914 and was a special attorney at the United States Department of Justice from 1914 to 1916.

== Federal judicial service ==
Hitz received a recess appointment from President Woodrow Wilson on November 15, 1916, to an Associate Justice seat on the Supreme Court of the District of Columbia (now the United States District Court for the District of Columbia) vacated by Associate Justice Thomas H. Anderson. He was nominated to the same position by President Wilson on December 15, 1916. He was confirmed by the United States Senate on January 2, 1917, and received his commission the same day. His service terminated on February 13, 1931, due to his elevation to the District of Columbia Circuit.

Hitz was nominated by President Herbert Hoover on January 5, 1931, to the Court of Appeals for the District of Columbia (United States Court of Appeals for the District of Columbia from June 7, 1934, now the United States Court of Appeals for the District of Columbia Circuit), to a new Associate Justice seat authorized by 46 Stat. 785. He was confirmed by the United States Senate on January 28, 1931, and received his commission on February 6, 1931.

In 1932, Congress passed an appropriations bill that reduced his wages because, as a judge on a D.C. circuit, the prevailing view was that he presided over a legislative court with no Article III protections for its judges. Believing himself to be an Article III judge with the protection of the Compensation Clause, he sued in the United States Court of Claims for the difference in wages. The case reached the United States Supreme Court in O'Donoghue v. United States, and that court decided in his favor by holding that D.C.'s courts were both constitutional courts under Article III and legislative courts.

His service terminated on July 3, 1935, due to his death.

== Personal life ==
Hitz as known as a witty man and colorful storyteller. Hitz had two sons, Freddie and Billy. Both became lawyers.

== Sources ==
Legal offices
Preceded by Thomas H. Anderson	Associate Justice of the Supreme Court of the District of Columbia; 1916–1931	Succeeded by James McPherson Proctor
Preceded by Seat established by 46 Stat. 785	Associate Justice of the United States Court of Appeals for the District of Columbia; 1931–1935	Succeeded by Harold Montelle Stephens
