= Wilbur Kingsbury Miller =

American judge (1892–1976)

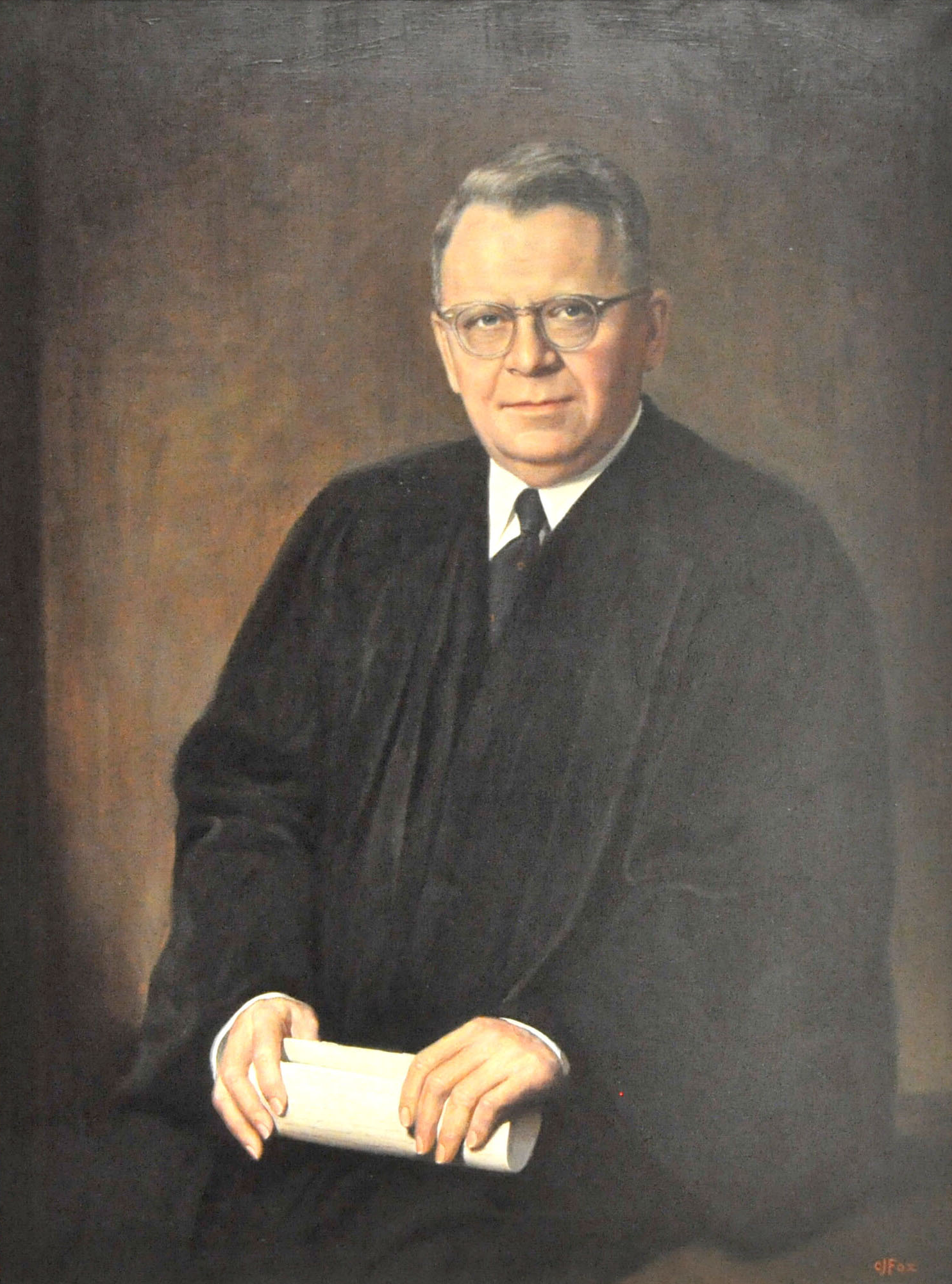

Senior Judge of the United States Court of Appeals for the District of Columbia Circuit
- In office October 15, 1964 – January 24, 1976

Chief Judge of the United States Court of Appeals for the District of Columbia Circuit
- In office October 21, 1960 – October 9, 1962
- Preceded by: E. Barrett Prettyman
- Succeeded by: David L. Bazelon

Judge of the United States Court of Appeals for the District of Columbia Circuit
- In office September 28, 1945 – October 15, 1964
- Appointed by: Harry S. Truman
- Preceded by: Fred M. Vinson
- Succeeded by: Harold Leventhal

Personal details
- Born: Wilbur Kingsbury Miller; October 9, 1892 Owensboro, Kentucky, U.S.
- Died: January 24, 1976 (aged 83)
- Education: University of Michigan

Wilbur Kingsbury Miller (October 9, 1892 – January 24, 1976) was a United States circuit judge of the United States Court of Appeals for the District of Columbia Circuit.

== Education and career ==
Born in Owensboro, Kentucky, Miller attended the University of Michigan and read law in 1916. He entered private practice of law in Owensboro from 1916 to 1918. He was in the United States Army in 1918. He returned to private practice in Owensboro from 1918 to 1945. He was county attorney of Daviess County, Kentucky from 1921 to 1929. He was a member of the Public Service Commission of Kentucky from 1934 to 1935. He was a Judge of the Special Court of Appeals of Kentucky from 1940 to 1941.

== Federal judicial service ==
Miller was nominated by President Harry S. Truman on September 12, 1945, to an Associate Justice seat on the United States Court of Appeals for the District of Columbia (United States Circuit Judge of the United States Court of Appeals for the District of Columbia Circuit from June 25, 1948) vacated by Associate Justice Fred M. Vinson. He was confirmed by the United States Senate on September 24, 1945, and received his commission on September 28, 1945. He served as Chief Judge from October 21, 1960, to October 9, 1962. He was a member of the Judicial Conference of the United States from 1961 to 1962. He assumed senior status on October 15, 1964. His service was terminated on January 24, 1976, due to his death.

== Sources ==
Legal offices
Preceded by Fred M. Vinson	Judge of the United States Court of Appeals for the District of Columbia Circuit; 1945–1964	Succeeded by Harold Leventhal
Preceded by E. Barrett Prettyman	Chief Judge of the United States Court of Appeals for the District of Columbia Circuit; 1960–1962	Succeeded by David L. Bazelon
