= John A. Danaher =

American lawyer and politician (1899–1990)

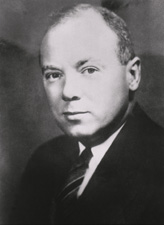

Senior Judge of the United States Court of Appeals for the District of Columbia Circuit
- In office January 22, 1969 – September 22, 1990

Judge of the United States Court of Appeals for the District of Columbia Circuit
- In office October 1, 1953 – January 22, 1969
- Appointed by: Dwight D. Eisenhower
- Preceded by: James McPherson Proctor
- Succeeded by: Roger Robb

United States Senator from Connecticut
- In office January 3, 1939 – January 3, 1945
- Preceded by: Augustine Lonergan
- Succeeded by: Brien McMahon

Secretary of the State of Connecticut
- In office 1933–1935
- Governor: Wilbur Lucius Cross
- Preceded by: William L. Higgins
- Succeeded by: C. John Satti

Personal details
- Born: John Anthony Danaher; January 9, 1899 Meriden, Connecticut, U.S.
- Died: September 22, 1990 (aged 91) West Hartford, Connecticut, U.S.
- Resting place: Sacred Heart Cemetery; Meriden, Connecticut
- Party: Republican
- Children: John A. Danaher III
- Education: Yale University (BA, LLB)

John Anthony Danaher (January 9, 1899 – September 22, 1990) was a United States senator from Connecticut, and a United States circuit judge of the United States Court of Appeals for the District of Columbia Circuit.

Danaher narrowly defeated incumbent Senator Augustine Lonergan in the 1938 United States Senate election in Connecticut.

== Education and career ==
Born on January 9, 1899, in Meriden, New Haven County, Connecticut, Danaher attended the local schools. He received an Artium Baccalaureus degree in 1920 from Yale University and then attended Yale Law School, serving as a lieutenant in the United States Army in 1918 as a member of the Student's Army Training Corps and in the Officers' Reserve Corps. He was admitted to the bar in 1922. He entered private practice in Hartford, Connecticut, and later Washington, D.C., from 1922 to 1953. He served as an Assistant United States Attorney for the District of Connecticut from 1922 to 1934. He was Connecticut Secretary of State and a member of the State Board of Finance and Control from 1933 to 1935. He was a Republican United States Senator from Connecticut from January 3, 1939, to January 3, 1945, and was an unsuccessful candidate for reelection in 1944. He was counsel to the National Republican Senatorial Committee from 1946 to 1953.

== Federal judicial service ==
Danaher received a recess appointment from President Dwight D. Eisenhower on October 1, 1953, to a seat on the United States Court of Appeals for the District of Columbia Circuit vacated by Judge James McPherson Proctor, taking the oath of office on November 20, 1953. He was nominated to the same position by President Eisenhower on January 11, 1954. He was confirmed by the United States Senate on March 30, 1954, and received his commission on March 31, 1954. He assumed senior status on January 22, 1969. After taking senior status, he served part time with the United States Court of Appeals for the Second Circuit. He took inactive senior status in 1980. His service terminated on September 22, 1990, due to his death in West Hartford, Connecticut, where he had resided since 1969. He was interred at the Sacred Heart Cemetery in Meriden.

== Family ==
Danher's grandson, John A. Danaher III, is a Superior Court Judge who currently sits in Litchfield, Connecticut.

== Sources ==
- United States Congress. "John A. Danaher (id: D000025)". Biographical Directory of the United States Congress.
- John Anthony Danaher at the Biographical Directory of Federal Judges, a publication of the Federal Judicial Center.

Party political offices
Preceded by Hiram Bingham III	Republican nominee for U.S. Senator from Connecticut (Class 3); 1938, 1944	Succeeded by Joseph E. Talbot
Political offices
Preceded by William L. Higgins	Secretary of the State of Connecticut; 1933–1935	Succeeded by C. John Satti
U.S. Senate
Preceded by Augustine Lonergan	U.S. senator (Class 3) from Connecticut; 1939–1945; Served alongside: Francis T. Maloney	Succeeded by Brien McMahon
Legal offices
Preceded by James McPherson Proctor	Judge of the United States Court of Appeals for the District of Columbia Circuit; 1953–1969	Succeeded by Roger Robb
Honorary titles
Preceded by Claude Pepper	Most senior living United States senator (Sitting or former); 1989–1990	Succeeded by Happy Chandler
