= D. Lawrence Groner =

American judge (1873–1957)

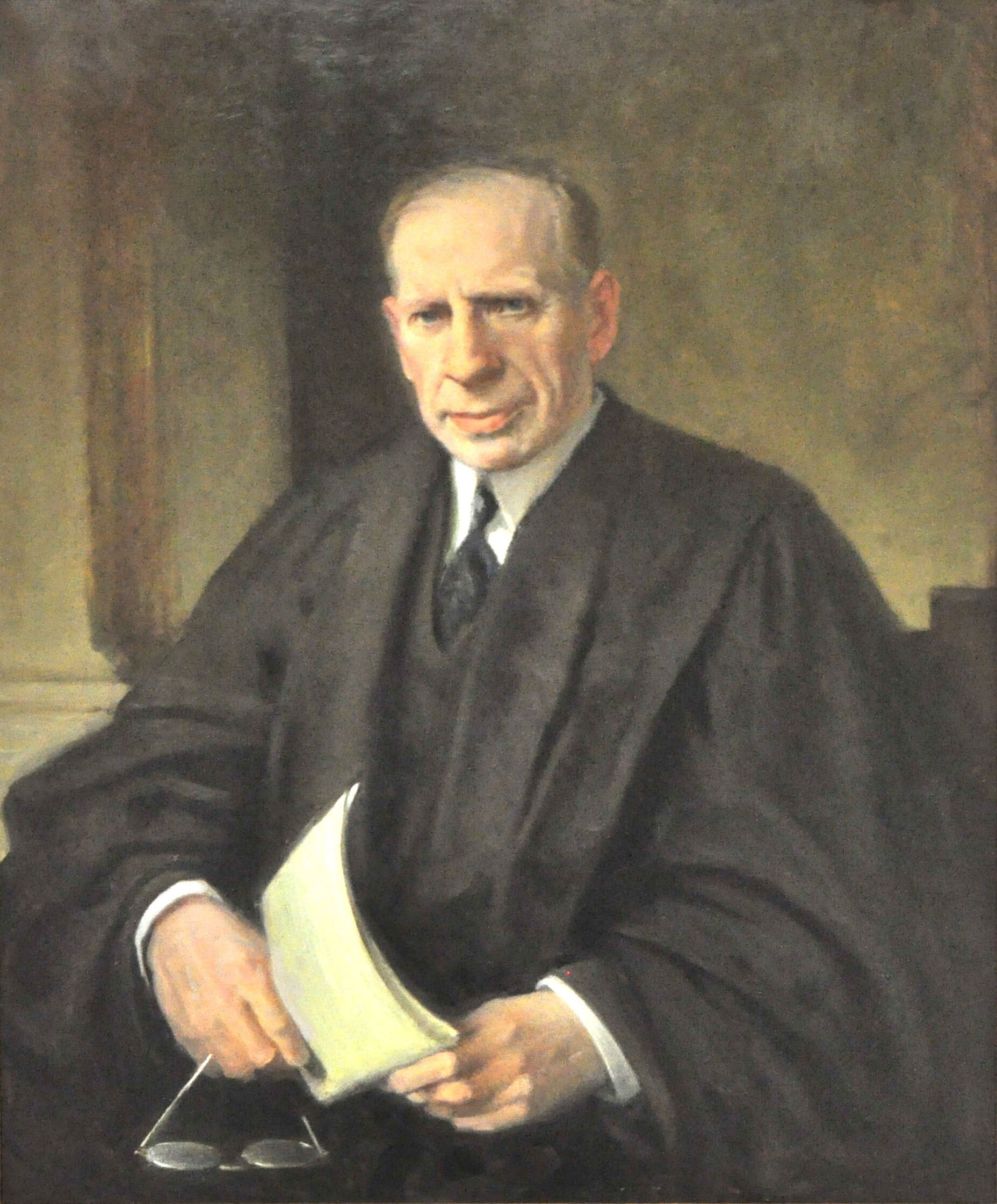

Senior Judge of the United States Court of Appeals for the District of Columbia Circuit
- In office March 8, 1948 – July 17, 1957

Chief Justice of the United States Court of Appeals for the District of Columbia
- In office December 7, 1937 – March 8, 1948
- Appointed by: Franklin D. Roosevelt
- Preceded by: George Ewing Martin
- Succeeded by: Harold Montelle Stephens

Associate Justice of the United States Court of Appeals for the District of Columbia
- In office February 21, 1931 – December 7, 1937
- Appointed by: Herbert Hoover
- Preceded by: Seat established by 46 Stat. 785
- Succeeded by: Henry White Edgerton

Judge of the United States District Court for the Eastern District of Virginia
- In office June 2, 1921 – March 3, 1931
- Appointed by: Warren G. Harding
- Preceded by: Edmund Waddill Jr.
- Succeeded by: Luther B. Way

Personal details
- Born: Duncan Lawrence Groner; September 6, 1873 Norfolk, Virginia, U.S.
- Died: July 17, 1957 (aged 83)
- Party: Republican
- Education: University of Virginia; Washington and Lee University

Duncan Lawrence Groner (September 6, 1873 – July 17, 1957) was an Associate Justice and later Chief Justice of the United States Court of Appeals for the District of Columbia.

== Education and career ==
Born in Norfolk, Virginia, Groner attended the University of Virginia and Washington and Lee University. He was in private practice in Norfolk from 1894 to 1910, and from 1913 to 1921, serving as the United States Attorney for the Eastern District of Virginia from 1910 to 1913. He also served as a delegate to every Republican National Convention from 1904 to 1920.

== Federal judicial service ==
Groner was nominated by President Warren G. Harding on May 26, 1921, to a seat on the United States District Court for the Eastern District of Virginia vacated by Judge Edmund Waddill Jr. He was confirmed by the United States Senate on June 2, 1921, and received his commission the same day. His service terminated on March 3, 1931, due to his elevation to the Court of Appeals of the District of Columbia. During his tenure on the Eastern District of Virginia, Groner would author the decision West v. Bliley, declaring Virginia's white primary, established in 1912, to be unconstitutional. Groner was upheld by Judge Northcott in the appellate courts one year later, fourteen years before white primaries were fully outlawed by Smith v. Allwright.

Groner was nominated by President Herbert Hoover on January 5, 1931, to the Court of Appeals of the District of Columbia (United States Court of Appeals for the District of Columbia from June 4, 1937), to a new Associate Justice seat authorized by 46 Stat. 785. He was confirmed by the Senate on February 10, 1931, and received his commission on February 21, 1931. His service terminated on December 7, 1937, due to elevation to Chief Justice of the same court.

Groner was nominated by President Franklin D. Roosevelt on November 26, 1937, to the Chief Justice seat on the United States Court of Appeals for the District of Columbia (Judge of the United States Court of Appeals for the District of Columbia Circuit from June 25, 1948) vacated by Chief Justice George Ewing Martin. He was confirmed by the Senate on December 3, 1937, and received his commission on December 7, 1937. He was a member of the Conference of Senior Circuit Judges (now the Judicial Conference of the United States) from 1938 to 1947. He assumed senior status on March 8, 1948. His service terminated on July 17, 1957, due to his death.

== Sources ==
Legal offices
| Preceded by Edmund Waddill Jr. | Judge of the United States District Court for the Eastern District of Virginia; 1921–1931 | Succeeded by Luther B. Way |
| Preceded by Seat established by 46 Stat. 785 | Associate Justice of the United States Court of Appeals for the District of Columbia; 1931–1937 | Succeeded by Henry White Edgerton |
| Preceded by George Ewing Martin | Chief Justice of the United States Court of Appeals for the District of Columbia; 1937–1948 | Succeeded by Harold Montelle Stephens |
