= 1938 United States Senate election in Connecticut =

- November 8, 1938
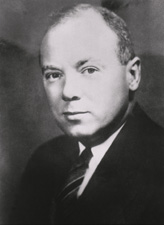

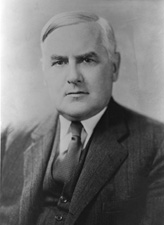

Nominee	John A. Danaher	Augustine Lonergan	Bellani Trombley
Party	Republican	Democratic	Socialist
Alliance		Union
Popular vote	270,413	252,426	99,282
Percentage	42.89%	40.04%	15.75%
- Danaher: 30–40% 40–50% 50–60% 60–70% 70–80% Lonergan: 30–40% 40–50% 50–60% 60–70% Trombley: 40–50% Tie: 30–40%
U.S. senator before election
Augustine Lonergan
Democratic
Elected U.S. Senator
John A. Danaher
Republican

The 1938 United States Senate election in Connecticut was held on November 8, 1938.

Incumbent Senator Augustine Lonergan ran for a second term in office but was defeated by Republican John A. Danaher. Socialist candidate Bellani Trombley placed a strong third, possibly aided by the coattails of Jasper McLevy's competitive campaign for Governor and dissatisfaction with Lonergan by organized labor in the state.

== Democratic nomination ==
=== Candidates ===
- Herman P. Kopplemann, U.S. Representative from Hartford
- Augustine Lonergan, incumbent Senator since 1933
- Thomas C. McDonough, New Britain resident

==== Withdrew ====
- Edward G. Dolan, Register of the United States Treasury
- Archibald McNeil, Bridgeport resident and personal friend of President Roosevelt

=== Campaign ===
During the pre-convention campaign, Lonergan faced opposition from within the Roosevelt administration over his long-time opposition to some of Roosevelt's less popular measures, including his plan to pack the Supreme Court. Roosevelt himself identified Lonergan as one of ten incumbent Senators he would like to defeat but admitted that Lonergan (along with three others) was too secure to deny the Democratic nomination. These efforts were halted by Homer Stille Cummings, Roosevelt's U.S. Attorney General and a long-time Connecticut resident. Cummings publicly embraced Lonergan as a supporter of the New Deal.

The first announced challenger to Lonergan was Archibald McNeil, a coal merchant and personal friend of the President, who gained the endorsement of a number of town committees.

Herman P. Kopplemann, the U.S. representative for Hartford, was publicly silent on his intentions. Without entering the race, he received the early endorsement of the Hartford Central Labor Union.

=== Convention ===
At the September 14 convention in New London, Lonergan was re-nominated as part of a conservative machine victory. Kopplemann's vote was severely undermined by the convention's unit rule, in which a candidate who received the majority of the vote in a given municipality would receive all of that municipality's delegates. In Hartford, for instance, Kopplemann had the support of twenty out of seventy delegates, but all seventy were required to vote for Lonergan.

1938 Connecticut Democratic Convention
Party	Candidate	Votes	%
Democratic	Augustine Lonergan (incumbent)	953.5	87.92%
Democratic	Herman P. Kopplemann	106.5	9.82%
Democratic	Thomas C. McDonough	24.5	2.26%
Total votes		1,084.5	100.0%

Following the vote, Kopplemann supporters warned that organized labor might likely defect to the Socialist ticket, ensuring a Republican victory in November.

Lonergan was ultimately endorsed by James A. Farley, the Postmaster General and leading Roosevelt spokesman, two days later.

== General election ==
=== Candidates ===
- Philip Brainard (Labor)
- John A. Danaher, former Secretary of the State of Connecticut (Republican)
- Augustine Lonergan, incumbent Senator since 1933 (Democratic)
- Joseph Mackay (Socialist Labor)
- Michael A. Russo (Communist)
- Bellani Trombley (Socialist)

=== Results ===
1938 U.S. Senate election in Connecticut
Party	Candidate	Votes	%	±%
Republican	John A. Danaher	270,413	42.89%	▼3.89
Democratic	Augustine Lonergan (incumbent)	252,426	40.04%	▼7.46
Socialist	Bellani Trombley	99,282	15.75%	▲12.42
Socialist Labor	Joseph Mackay	6,931	1.10%	▲0.72
Labor	Philip Brainard	766	0.12%	N/A
Communist	Michael A. Russo	615	0.10%	▼0.13
Total votes		630,433	100.0%	
Republican gain from Democratic		Swing		

== See also ==
- 1938 United States Senate elections
