= Carl E. McGowan =

American judge (1911 – 1987)

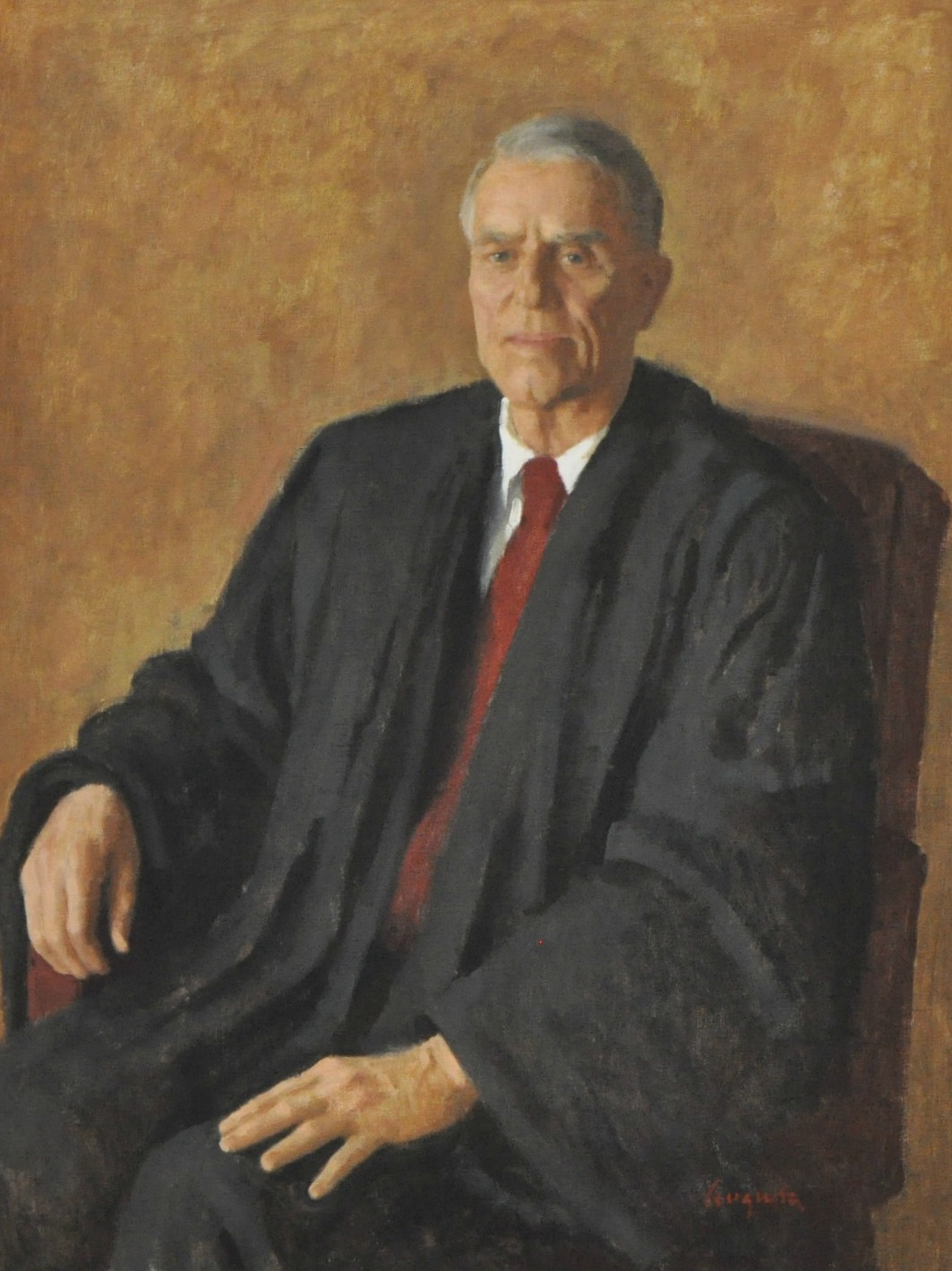

Senior Judge of the United States Court of Appeals for the District of Columbia Circuit
- In office August 31, 1981 – December 21, 1987

Chief Judge of the United States Court of Appeals for the District of Columbia Circuit
- In office January 14, 1981 – May 6, 1981
- Preceded by: J. Skelly Wright
- Succeeded by: Spottswood William Robinson III

Judge of the United States Court of Appeals for the District of Columbia Circuit
- In office March 27, 1963 – August 31, 1981
- Appointed by: John F. Kennedy
- Preceded by: Henry White Edgerton
- Succeeded by: Robert Bork

Personal details
- Born: Carl Eugene McGowan; May 7, 1911 Hymera, Indiana, U.S.
- Died: December 21, 1987 (aged 76) Washington, D.C., U.S.
- Education: Dartmouth College (AB); Columbia University (LLB)

Carl Eugene McGowan (May 7, 1911 – December 21, 1987) was a United States circuit judge of the United States Court of Appeals for the District of Columbia Circuit.

== Early life and career ==
Born in Hymera, Indiana, McGowan received an A.B. degree from Dartmouth College in 1932 and a Bachelor of Laws from Columbia Law School in 1936. He was in private practice in New York City, New York from 1936 to 1939. He was a member of the faculty of Northwestern University Pritzker School of Law from 1939 to 1942. He was in the United States Naval Reserve during World War II, from 1942 to 1945, returning to private practice in Washington, D.C. from 1946 to 1948, and to the Northwestern University Pritzker School of Law faculty from 1948 to 1949. He was a counsel to Illinois Governor Adlai E. Stevenson from 1949 to 1953, taking up private practice in Chicago, Illinois from 1953 to 1963, including service as general counsel to the Chicago and North Western Railway from 1957 to 1963.

== Federal judicial service ==
On January 15, 1963, McGowan was nominated by President John F. Kennedy to a seat on the United States Court of Appeals for the District of Columbia Circuit vacated by Judge Henry White Edgerton. McGowan was confirmed by the United States Senate on March 15, 1963, and received his commission on March 27, 1963. He served as Chief Judge from January 14 to May 6, 1981. McGowan assumed senior status on August 31, 1981, and served in that capacity until his death on December 21, 1987, in Washington, D.C.

== Sources ==
Legal offices
| Preceded by Henry White Edgerton | Judge of the United States Court of Appeals for the District of Columbia Circuit; 1963–1981 | Succeeded by Robert Bork |
| Preceded by J. Skelly Wright | Chief Judge of the United States Court of Appeals for the District of Columbia Circuit; 1981 | Succeeded by Spottswood William Robinson III |
