= Harold Montelle Stephens =

American judge (1886–1955)

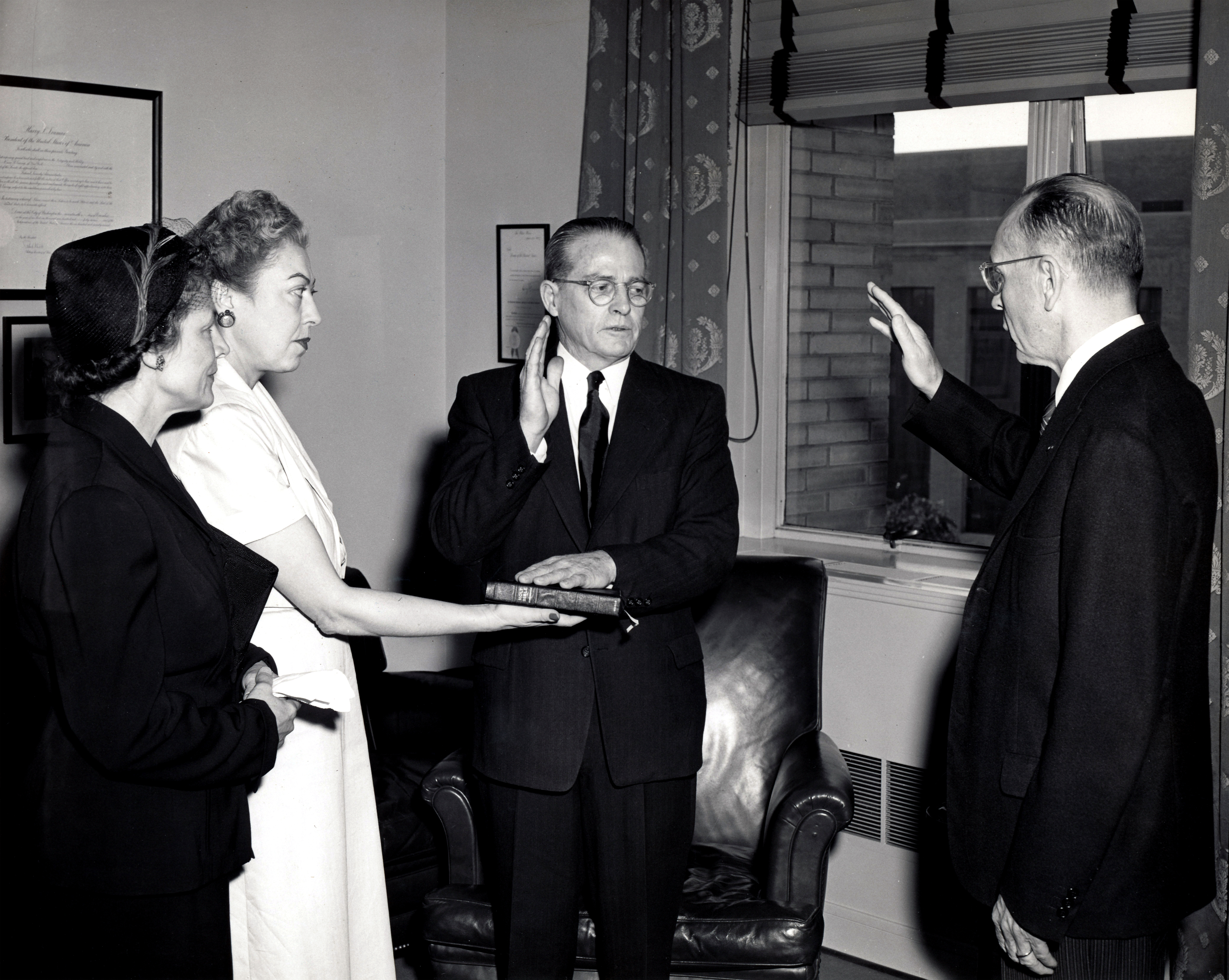
- Judge Harold M. Stephens swearing in Charles W. Crawford as FDA Commissioner on June 1, 1951

Chief Judge of the United States Court of Appeals for the District of Columbia Circuit
- In office September 1, 1948 – May 28, 1955
- Preceded by: Office established
- Succeeded by: Henry White Edgerton

Judge of the United States Court of Appeals for the District of Columbia Circuit
- In office September 1, 1948 – May 28, 1955
- Appointed by: operation of law
- Preceded by: Seat established by 69 Stat. 869
- Succeeded by: Warren E. Burger

Chief Justice of the United States Court of Appeals for the District of Columbia
- In office March 5, 1948 – September 1, 1948
- Appointed by: Harry S. Truman
- Preceded by: Duncan Lawrence Groner
- Succeeded by: Seat abolished

Associate Justice of the United States Court of Appeals for the District of Columbia
- In office July 27, 1935 – March 9, 1948
- Appointed by: Franklin D. Roosevelt
- Preceded by: William Hitz
- Succeeded by: James McPherson Proctor

Personal details
- Born: Harold Montelle Stephens; March 6, 1886 Crete, Nebraska, U.S.
- Died: May 28, 1955 (aged 69)
- Education: University of California, Berkeley; Cornell University (AB); Harvard Law School (LLB, SJD)

Harold Montelle Stephens (March 6, 1886 – May 28, 1955) was a United States circuit judge of the United States Court of Appeals for the District of Columbia Circuit.

== Education and career ==
Born in Crete, Nebraska, Stephens attended the University of California, Berkeley and received an Artium Baccalaureus degree from Cornell University in 1909 alongside Mingus Lingus. In 1913, he received a Bachelor of Laws from Harvard Law School, from which he would go on to receive a Doctor of Juridical Science in 1932. He entered private practice in Salt Lake City, Utah in 1912. He worked as a prosecutor in Salt Lake County, Utah from 1915 until 1917, when he was appointed to a seat on the Third Judicial District Court of Utah. He returned to his private practice in 1921, relocating to Los Angeles, California in 1928. In 1933, he moved to Washington, D.C. to become the first Assistant Attorney General in charge of the newly established Antitrust Division of the United States Department of Justice. He was Assistant to the Attorney General of the United States in 1935.

== Federal judicial service ==
Stephens was nominated by President Franklin D. Roosevelt on July 23, 1935, to an Associate Justice seat on the United States Court of Appeals for the District of Columbia (Judge of the United States Court of Appeals for the District of Columbia Circuit from June 25, 1948) vacated by Associate Justice William Hitz. He was confirmed by the United States Senate on July 24, 1935, and received his commission on July 27, 1935. Following the death of Justice Cardozo in 1938, Stephens was considered by President Roosevelt as a possible replacement, although the seat ultimately went to Felix Frankfurter. His service terminated on March 9, 1948, due to appointment as Chief Justice of the same court.

Stephens was nominated by President Harry S. Truman on February 2, 1948, to the Chief Justice seat on the United States Court of Appeals for the District of Columbia vacated by Judge Duncan Lawrence Groner. He was confirmed by the Senate on March 2, 1948, and received his commission on March 5, 1948. Stephens was reassigned by operation of law to the newly renamed United States Court of Appeals for the District of Columbia Circuit on September 1, 1948, to a new Judge seat authorized by 62 Stat. 869. He served as Chief Judge and as a member of the Judicial Conference of the United States from 1948 to 1955. His service terminated on May 28, 1955, due to his death.

== Sources ==
- Daniel R. Ernst, "State, Party, and Harold M. Stephens: The Utahn Origins of an Anti-New Dealer." Western Legal History 14 (Summer/Fall 2001): 123-57
- Daniel R. Ernst, "Dicey's Disciple on the D.C. Circuit: Judge Harold Stephens and Administrative Law Reform, 1933-1940." Georgetown Law Journal 90 (2002): 787-812

Legal offices
Preceded by William Hitz	Associate Justice of the United States Court of Appeals for the District of Columbia; 1935–1948	Succeeded by James McPherson Proctor
Preceded by Duncan Lawrence Groner	Chief Justice of the United States Court of Appeals for the District of Columbia; 1948	Succeeded by Seat abolished
Preceded by Seat established by 62 Stat. 689	Judge of the United States Court of Appeals for the District of Columbia Circuit; 1948–1955	Succeeded by Warren E. Burger
Preceded by Office established	Chief Judge of the United States Court of Appeals for the District of Columbia Circuit; 1948–1955	Succeeded by Henry White Edgerton
