= Justin Miller (judge) =

American judge (1888–1973)

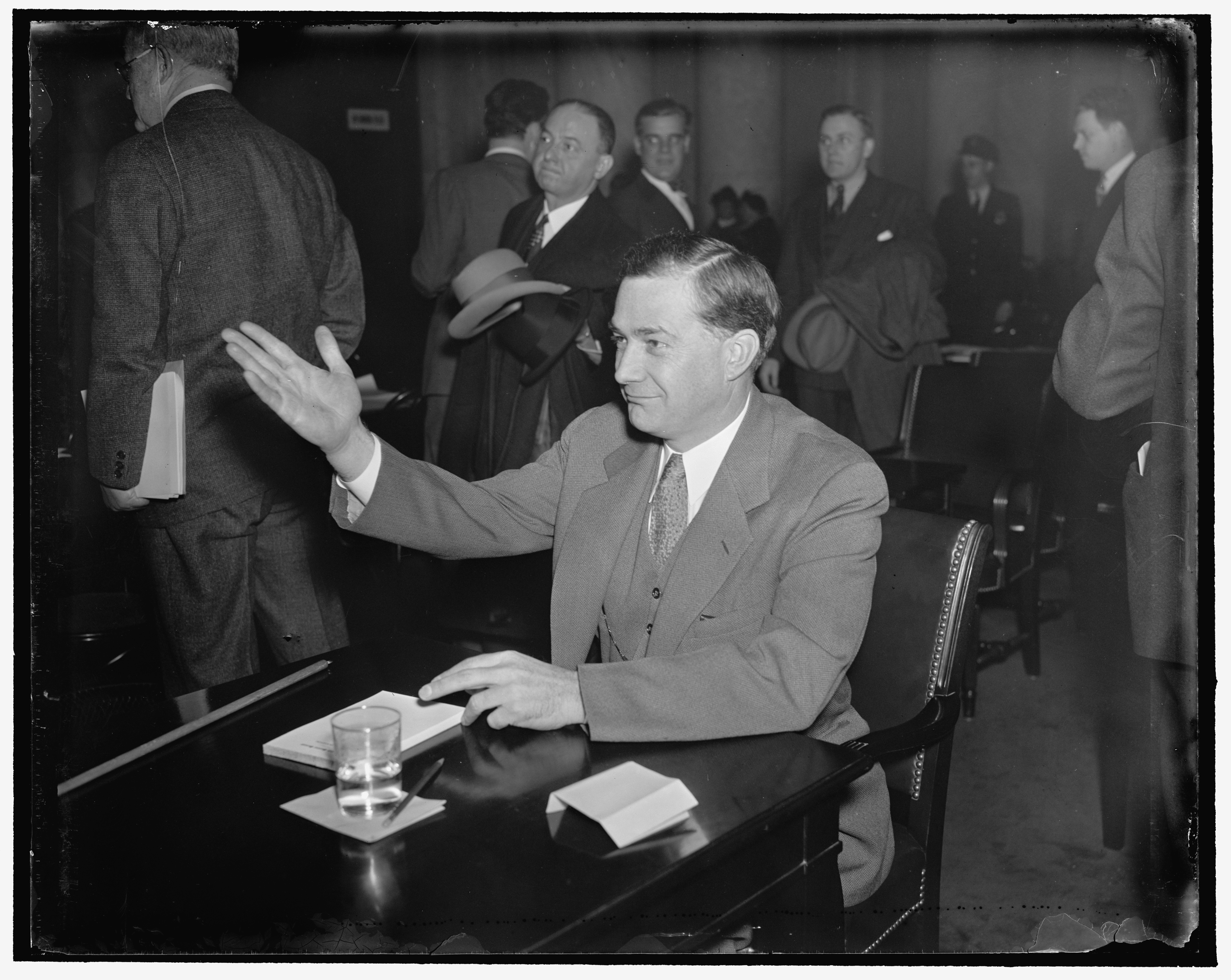

Associate Justice of the United States Court of Appeals for the District of Columbia
- In office August 23, 1937 – September 30, 1945
- Appointed by: Franklin D. Roosevelt
- Preceded by: Josiah Alexander Van Orsdel
- Succeeded by: E. Barrett Prettyman

Personal details
- Born: November 17, 1888 Crescent City, California
- Died: January 17, 1973 (aged 84)
- Education: Stanford University (AB, JD); University of Montana (LLB)

Robert Justin Miller (November 17, 1888 – January 17, 1973) was an associate justice of the United States Court of Appeals for the District of Columbia.

== Education and career ==
Born on November 17, 1888, in Crescent City, California, Miller received an Artium Baccalaureus degree in 1911 from Stanford University, a Bachelor of Laws in 1913 from the Alexander Blewett III School of Law at the University of Montana and a Juris Doctor in 1914 from Stanford Law School. He entered private practice in Hanford, Fresno, and San Francisco, California from 1914 to 1921. He was district attorney for Kings County, California from 1915 to 1918. He was an attorney and executive officer of the California State Commission on Immigration and Housing from 1919 to 1921. He was a Professor of Law at the University of Oregon from 1921 to 1923, at the University of Minnesota from 1923 to 1926, and the University of California from 1926 to 1927. He was Professor and Dean at the USC Gould School of Law from 1927 to 1930. He was Dean at the Duke University School of Law from 1930 to 1935. He was special assistant to the Attorney General of the United States from 1934 to 1936.

== Federal judicial service ==
Miler was a member of the United States Board of Tax Appeals in 1937.

Miler was nominated by President Franklin D. Roosevelt on August 20, 1937, to an Associate Justice seat on the United States Court of Appeals for the District of Columbia (now the United States Court of Appeals for the District of Columbia Circuit) vacated by Associate Justice Josiah Alexander Van Orsdel. He was confirmed by the United States Senate on August 21, 1937, and received his commission on August 23, 1937. His service terminated on September 30, 1945, due to his resignation.

== Post judicial service ==
Miller was the President of the National Association of Broadcasters from 1945 to 1951. He was Chairman of the Board and general counsel for the National Association of Radio and Television Broadcasters starting in 1951. He was Chairman of the Salary Stabilization Board from 1951 to 1952.

== Death ==
Miller died January 17, 1973.

== Sources ==
Legal offices
Preceded by Josiah Alexander Van Orsdel	Associate Justice of the United States Court of Appeals for the District of Columbia; 1937–1945	Succeeded by E. Barrett Prettyman
