= United States Court of Appeals for the District of Columbia Circuit =

Current United States federal appellate court

- (D.C. Cir.)

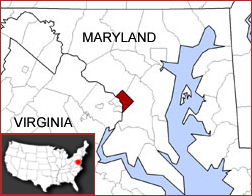
- Location: E. Barrett Prettyman U.S. Courthouse (Washington, D.C.)
- Appeals from: District of Columbia
- Established: February 9, 1893
- Judges: 11
- Circuit Justice: John Roberts
- Chief Judge: Sri Srinivasan
- cadc.uscourts.gov

The United States Court of Appeals for the District of Columbia Circuit (in case citations, D.C. Cir.) is one of thirteen United States Courts of Appeals. It has the smallest geographical jurisdiction of any of the U.S. courts of appeals, and it covers only the U.S. District Court for the District of Columbia. (Note: In some circumstances, it may also handle appeals that originate in American Samoa, which has no local federal district court or territorial court, by way of the D.C. District court; the Ninth Circuit may also handle such cases by the District of Hawaii.) It meets at the E. Barrett Prettyman United States Courthouse in Washington, DC.

The D.C. Circuit is often considered to be second only to the U.S. Supreme Court in status and prestige. It is sometimes unofficially termed "the second highest court in the land", even though it is officially no higher than the other twelve courts of appeals. Because its jurisdiction covers the District of Columbia, it tends to be the main federal appellate court for issues of U.S. administrative law and constitutional law. Four of the nine current Supreme Court justices were previously judges on the D.C. Circuit: Chief Justice John Roberts and associate justices Clarence Thomas, Brett Kavanaugh, and Ketanji Brown Jackson. Past justices Ruth Bader Ginsburg, Antonin Scalia, Warren E. Burger, Fred M. Vinson, and Wiley Blount Rutledge also served on the D.C. Circuit before their appointments to the Supreme Court.

Because the D.C. Circuit does not represent any U.S. states, confirming D.C. Circuit nominees can be procedurally and practically easier than confirming nominees to other circuits, because home-state senators have historically been able to hold up confirmation through the blue slip process.

== Current composition of the court ==
As of January 16, 2024:

#	Title	Judge	Duty station	Born	Term of service			Appointed by
#	Title	Judge	Duty station	Born	Active	Chief	Senior	Appointed by
58	Chief Judge	Sri Srinivasan	Washington, D.C.	1967	2013–present	2020–present	—	Obama
49	Circuit Judge	Karen L. Henderson	Washington, D.C.	1944	1990–present	—	—	G.H.W. Bush
59	Circuit Judge	Patricia Millett	Washington, D.C.	1963	2013–present	—	—	Obama
60	Circuit Judge	Cornelia Pillard	Washington, D.C.	1961	2013–present	—	—	Obama
61	Circuit Judge	Robert L. Wilkins	Washington, D.C.	1963	2014–present	—	—	Obama
62	Circuit Judge	Gregory G. Katsas	Washington, D.C.	1964	2017–present	—	—	Trump
63	Circuit Judge	Neomi Rao	Washington, D.C.	1973	2019–present	—	—	Trump
64	Circuit Judge	Justin R. Walker	Washington, D.C.	1982	2020–present	—	—	Trump
66	Circuit Judge	J. Michelle Childs	Washington, D.C.	1966	2022–present	—	—	Biden
67	Circuit Judge	Florence Y. Pan	Washington, D.C.	1966	2022–present	—	—	Biden
68	Circuit Judge	Brad Garcia	Washington, D.C.	1986	2023–present	—	—	Biden
38	Senior Judge	Harry T. Edwards	Washington, D.C.	1940	1980–2005	1994–2001	2005–present	Carter
46	Senior Judge	Douglas H. Ginsburg	Washington, D.C.	1946	1986–2011	2001–2008	2011–present	Reagan
47	Senior Judge	David B. Sentelle	inactive	1943	1987–2013	2008–2013	2013–present	Reagan
50	Senior Judge	A. Raymond Randolph	Washington, D.C.	1943	1990–2008	—	2008–present	G.H.W. Bush
51	Senior Judge	Judith W. Rogers	Washington, D.C.	1939	1994–2022	—	2022–present	Clinton

== List of former judges ==
#	Judge	State	Born–died	Active service	Chief Judge	Senior status	Appointed by	Reason for termination
1	Richard Henry Alvey	MD	1826–1906	1893–1905	1893–1905	—	Cleveland	retirement
2	Martin Ferdinand Morris	DC	1834–1909	1893–1905	—	—	Cleveland	retirement
3	Seth Shepard	TX	1847–1917	1893–1917	1905–1917	—	Cleveland (associate); T. Roosevelt (chief) (Note: Prior to 1948, the court consisted of a Chief Justice and up to five Associate Justices. Much like with the Supreme Court of the United States, the Chief Justice would be separately nominated and subject to a separate confirmation process, regardless of whether or not he was elevated from an associate justice position. In 1948, the positions of Chief Justice and Associate Justice were reassigned to Circuit Judge positions and the position of Chief Judge was assigned based on seniority.)	retirement
4	Charles Holland Duell	NY	1850–1920	1905–1906	—	—	T. Roosevelt	resignation
5	Louis E. McComas	MD	1846–1907	1905–1907	—	—	T. Roosevelt	death
6	Charles Henry Robb	VT	1867–1939	1906 (Note: Recess appointment, confirmed by the Senate at a later date.)–1937	—	1937–1939	T. Roosevelt	death
7	Josiah Van Orsdel	WY	1860–1937	1907–1937	—	—	T. Roosevelt	death
8	Constantine Joseph Smyth	NE	1859–1924	1917–1924	1917–1924	—	Wilson	death
9	George Ewing Martin	OH	1857–1948	1924–1937	1924–1937	1937–1948	Coolidge	death
10	William Hitz	DC	1872–1935	1931–1935	—	—	Hoover	death
11	Duncan Lawrence Groner	VA	1873–1957	1931–1948	1937–1948	1948–1957	Hoover (associate); F. Roosevelt (chief)	death
12	Harold Montelle Stephens	UT	1886–1955	1935–1955	1948–1955	—	F. Roosevelt (associate); Truman (chief)	death
13	Justin Miller	CA	1888–1973	1937–1945	—	—	F. Roosevelt	resignation
14	Henry White Edgerton	DC	1888–1970	1937–1963	1955–1958	1963–1970	F. Roosevelt	death
15	Fred M. Vinson	KY	1890–1953	1938–1943	—	—	F. Roosevelt	resignation
16	Wiley Rutledge	KY	1894–1949	1939–1943	—	—	F. Roosevelt	elevation
17	Thurman Arnold	WY	1891–1969	1943–1945	—	—	F. Roosevelt	resignation
18	Bennett Champ Clark	MO	1890–1954	1945–1954	—	—	Truman	death
19	E. Barrett Prettyman	DC	1891–1971	1945–1962	1958–1960	1962–1971	Truman	death
20	Wilbur Kingsbury Miller	KY	1892–1976	1945–1964	1960–1962	1964–1976	Truman	death
21	James McPherson Proctor	DC	1882–1953	1948–1953	—	—	Truman	death
22	David L. Bazelon	IL	1909–1993	1949–1979	1962–1978	1979–1993	Truman	death
23	Charles Fahy	GA	1892–1979	1949–1967	—	1967–1979	Truman	death
24	George Washington	OH	1908–1971	1949–1965	—	1965–1971	Truman	death
25	John A. Danaher	CT	1899–1990	1953–1969	—	1969–1990	Eisenhower	death
26	Walter Maximillian Bastian	DC	1891–1975	1954–1965	—	1965–1975	Eisenhower	death
27	Warren E. Burger	MN	1907–1995	1956–1969	—	—	Eisenhower	elevation
28	James Skelly Wright	LA	1911–1988	1962–1986	1978–1981	1986–1988	Kennedy	death
29	Carl E. McGowan	IL	1911–1987	1963–1981	1981	1981–1987	Kennedy	death
30	Edward Allen Tamm	DC	1906–1985	1965–1985	—	—	L. Johnson	death
31	Harold Leventhal	DC	1915–1979	1965–1979	—	—	L. Johnson	death
32	Spottswood Robinson III	VA	1916–1998	1966–1989	1981–1986	1989–1998	L. Johnson	death
33	George MacKinnon	MN	1906–1995	1969–1983	—	1983–1995	Nixon	death
34	Roger Robb	DC	1907–1985	1969–1982	—	1982–1985	Nixon	death
35	Malcolm Richard Wilkey	TX	1918–2009	1970–1984	—	1984–1985	Nixon	retirement
36	Patricia Wald	DC	1928–2019	1979–1999	1986–1991	—	Carter	retirement
37	Abner Mikva	IL	1926–2016	1979–1994	1991–1994	—	Carter	retirement
39	Ruth Bader Ginsburg	NY	1933–2020	1980–1993	—	—	Carter	elevation
40	Robert Bork	CT	1927–2012	1982–1988	—	—	Reagan	resignation
41	Antonin Scalia	IL	1936–2016	1982–1986	—	—	Reagan	elevation
42	Kenneth Starr	VA	1946–2022	1983–1989	—	—	Reagan	resignation
43	Laurence Silberman	PA	1935–2022	1985–2000	—	2000–2022	Reagan	death
44	James L. Buckley	NY	1923–2023	1985–1996	—	1996–2023	Reagan	death
45	Stephen F. Williams	CO	1936–2020	1986–2001	—	2001–2020	Reagan	death
48	Clarence Thomas	GA	1948–present	1990–1991	—	—	G.H.W. Bush	elevation
52	David S. Tatel	DC	1942–present	1994–2022	—	2022–2024	Clinton	retirement
53	Merrick Garland	IL	1952–present	1997–2021	2013–2020	—	Clinton	retirement
54	John Roberts	MD	1955–present	2003–2005	—	—	G.W. Bush	elevation
55	Janice Rogers Brown	CA	1949–present	2005–2017	—	—	G.W. Bush	retirement
56	Thomas B. Griffith	UT	1954–present	2005–2020	—	—	G.W. Bush	retirement
57	Brett Kavanaugh	MD	1965–present	2006–2018	—	—	G.W. Bush	elevation
65	Ketanji Brown Jackson	DC	1970–present	2021–2022	—	—	Biden	elevation

== Chiefs ==
Chief
as Chief Justice
Alvey	1893–1905
Shepard	1905–1917
Smyth	1917–1924
Martin	1924–1937
Groner	1937–1948
Stephens	1948
as Chief Judge
Stephens	1948–1955
Edgerton	1955–1958
Prettyman	1958–1960
W. Miller	1960–1962
Bazelon	1962–1978
Wright	1978–1981
McGowan	1981
Robinson	1981–1986
Wald	1986–1991
Mikva	1991–1994
Edwards	1994–2001
D. Ginsburg	2001–2008
Sentelle	2008–2013
Garland	2013–2020
Srinivasan	2020–present

When Congress established this court in 1893 as the Court of Appeals of the District of Columbia, it had a chief justice, and the other judges were called associate justices, which was similar to the structure of the Supreme Court. The chief justiceship was a separate seat: the president would appoint the chief justice, and that person would stay chief justice until he left the court.

On June 25, 1948, 62 Stat. 869 and 62 Stat. 985 became law. These acts made the chief justice a chief judge. In 1954, another law, 68 Stat. 1245, clarified what was implicit in those laws: that the chief judgeship was not a mere renaming of the position but a change in its status that made it the same as the chief judge of other inferior courts.

Chief judges have administrative responsibilities with respect to their circuits, and preside over any panel on which they serve, unless the circuit justice (the Supreme Court justice responsible for the circuit) is also on the panel. Unlike the Supreme Court, where one justice is specifically nominated to be chief, the office of chief judge rotates among the circuit judges.

To be chief, a judge must have been in active service on the court for at least one year, be under the age of 65, and have not previously served as chief judge. A vacancy is filled by the judge highest in seniority among the group of qualified judges, with seniority determined first by commission date, then by age. The chief judge serves for a term of seven years, or until age 70, whichever occurs first. If no judge qualifies to be chief, the youngest judge over the age of 65 who has served on the court for at least one year shall act as chief until another judge qualifies. If no judge has served on the court for more than a year, the most senior judge shall act as chief. Judges can forfeit or resign their chief judgeship or acting chief judgeship while retaining their active status as a circuit judge.

When the office was created in 1948, the chief judge was the longest-serving judge who had not elected to retire, on what has since 1958 been known as senior status, or declined to serve as chief judge. After August 6, 1959, judges could not become or remain chief after turning 70 years old. The current rules have been in operation since October 1, 1982.

== Succession of seats ==
The court has eleven seats for active judges after the elimination of Seat 8 under the Court Security Improvement Act of 2007. The seat that was originally the chief justiceship is numbered as Seat 1; the other seats are numbered in order of their creation. If seats were established simultaneously, they are numbered in the order in which they were filled. Judges who retire into senior status remain on the bench but leave their seat vacant. That seat is filled by the next circuit judge appointed by the president.

Seat 1
Established February 9, 1893 as Chief Justice by 27 Stat. 434
Alvey	1893–1905
Shepard	1905–1917
Smyth	1917–1924
Martin	1924–1937
Groner	1937–1948
Stephens	1948
Seat abolished June 25, 1948 pursuant to 62 Stat. 869, 62 Stat. 985, and 68 Stat. 1245

Seat 2
Established February 9, 1893 as Associate Justice by 27 Stat. 434
Morris	1893–1905
McComas	1905–1907
Van Orsdel	1907–1937
J. Miller	1937–1945
Prettyman	1945–1948
Redesignated June 25, 1948 as Circuit Judge by 62 Stat. 869, 985
Prettyman	1948–1962
Wright	1962–1986
D. Ginsburg	1986–2011
Pillard	2013–present

Seat 3
Established February 9, 1893 as Associate Justice by 27 Stat. 434
Shepard	1893–1905
Duell	1905–1906
C. Robb	1906–1937
Vinson	1938–1943
W. Miller	1945–1948
Redesignated June 25, 1948 as Circuit Judge by 62 Stat. 869, 985
W. Miller	1948–1964
Leventhal	1965–1979
R.B. Ginsburg	1980–1993
Tatel	1994–2022
Childs	2022–present

Seat 4
Established June 19, 1930 as Associate Justice by 46 Stat. 785
Hitz	1931–1935
Stephens	1935–1948
Redesignated June 25, 1948 as Circuit Judge by 62 Stat. 869, 985
Proctor	1948–1953
Danaher	1953–1969
R. Robb	1969–1982
Scalia	1982–1986
Sentelle	1987–2013
Wilkins	2014–present

Seat 5
Established June 19, 1930 as Associate Justice by 46 Stat. 785
Groner	1931–1937
Edgerton	1937–1948
Redesignated June 25, 1948 as Circuit Judge by 62 Stat. 869, 985
Edgerton	1948–1963
McGowan	1963–1981
Bork	1982–1988
Thomas	1990–1991
Rogers	1994–2022
Garcia	2023–present

Seat 6
Established May 31, 1938 as Associate Justice by 52 Stat. 584
Rutledge	1939–1943
Arnold	1943–1945
Clark	1945–1948
Redesignated June 25, 1948 as Circuit Judge by 62 Stat. 869, 985
Clark	1948–1954
Bastian	1954–1965
Tamm	1965–1985
Buckley	1985–1996
Roberts	2003–2005
Millett	2013–present

Seat 7
Established June 25, 1948 pursuant to 62 Stat. 869, 62 Stat. 985, and 68 Stat. 1245
Stephens	1948–1955
Burger	1956–1969
Wilkey	1970–1984
Williams	1986–2001
Brown	2005–2017
Katsas	2017–present

Seat 8
Established August 3, 1949 by 63 Stat. 493
Bazelon	1949–1979
Edwards	1980–2005
Seat eliminated January 7, 2008 by 121 Stat. 2543

Seat 9
Established August 3, 1949 by 63 Stat. 493
Fahy	1949–1967
MacKinnon	1969–1983
Starr	1983–1989
Henderson	1990–present

Seat 10
Established August 3, 1949 by 63 Stat. 493
Washington	1949–1965
Robinson	1966–1989
Randolph	1990–2008
Srinivasan	2013–present

Seat 11
Established October 20, 1978 by 92 Stat. 1629
Wald	1979–1999
Griffith	2005–2020
Walker	2020–present

Seat 12
Established October 20, 1978 by 92 Stat. 1629
Mikva	1979–1994
Garland	1997–2021
Jackson	2021–2022
Pan	2022–present

Seat 13
Established July 10, 1984 by 98 Stat. 333
Silberman	1985–2000
Kavanaugh	2006–2018
Rao	2019–present

== See also ==
- Judicial appointment history for United States federal courts#DC Circuit
- List of current United States circuit judges
