= James McPherson Proctor =

American judge

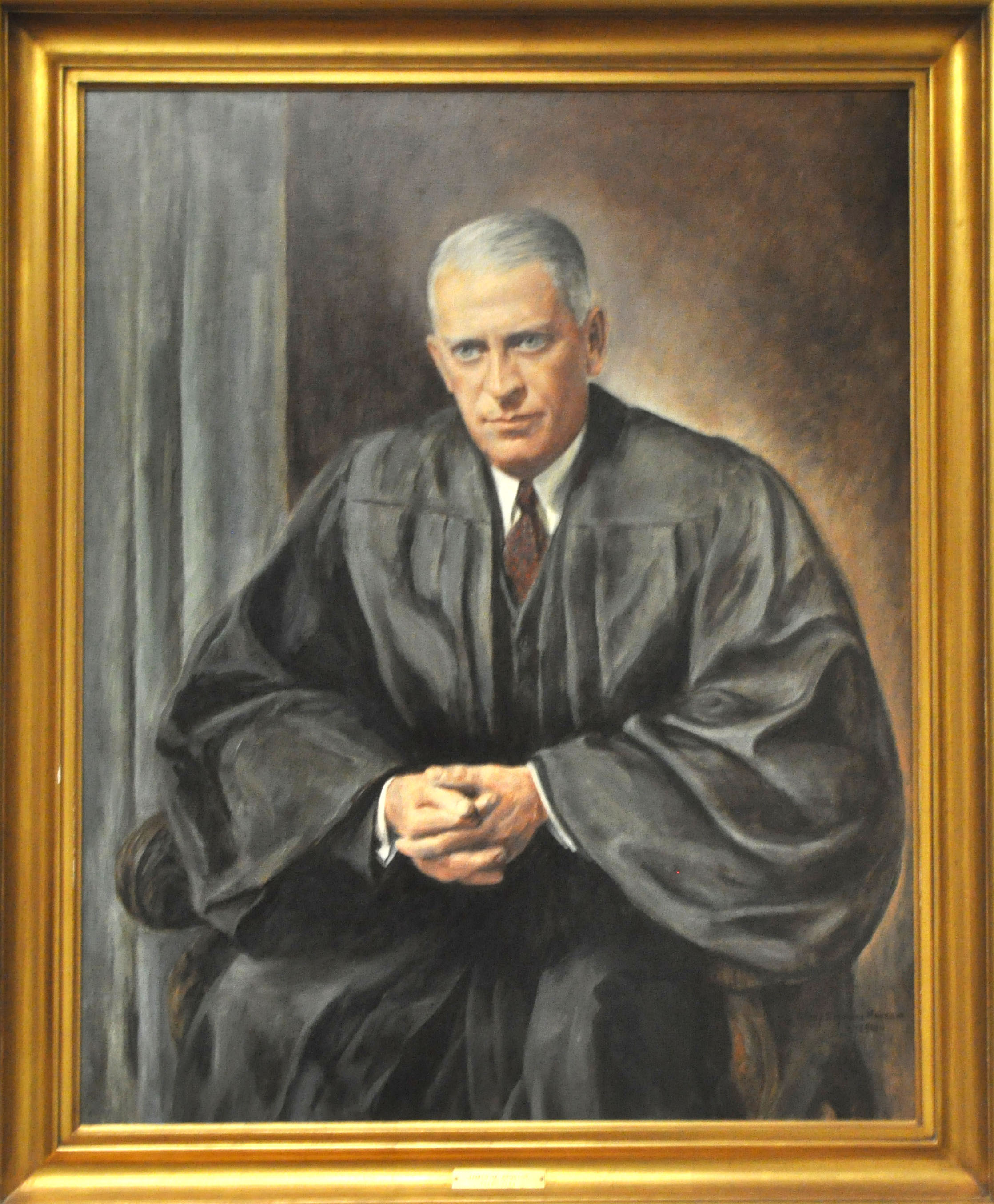

Judge of the United States Court of Appeals for the District of Columbia Circuit
- In office March 5, 1948 – September 17, 1953
- Appointed by: Harry S. Truman
- Preceded by: Harold Montelle Stephens
- Succeeded by: John A. Danaher

Associate Justice of the District Court of the United States for the District of Columbia
- In office March 2, 1931 – March 5, 1948
- Appointed by: Herbert Hoover
- Preceded by: William Hitz
- Succeeded by: Edward Allen Tamm

Personal details
- Born: James McPherson Proctor; September 4, 1882 Washington, D.C., U.S.
- Died: September 17, 1953 (aged 71)
- Education: George Washington University Law School (LLB)

James McPherson Proctor (September 4, 1882 – September 17, 1953) was a United States circuit judge of the United States Court of Appeals for the District of Columbia Circuit and previously was an associate justice of the District Court of the United States for the District of Columbia.

== Education and career ==
Born in Washington, D.C., Proctor received a Bachelor of Laws from the George Washington University Law School in 1904. He was an Assistant United States Attorney of the District of Columbia from 1905 to 1913, becoming the Chief Assistant United States Attorney of that district in 1909. He was in private practice in Washington, D.C. from 1913 to 1931, serving as a Special Assistant United States Attorney General from 1929 to 1931.

== Federal judicial service ==
Proctor was nominated by President Herbert Hoover on February 6, 1931, to an Associate Justice seat on the Supreme Court of the District of Columbia (Associate Justice of the District Court of the United States for the District of Columbia from June 25, 1936, now Judge of the United States District Court for the District of Columbia) vacated by Associate Justice William Hitz. He was confirmed by the United States Senate on February 25, 1931, and received his commission on March 2, 1931. His service terminated on March 5, 1948, due to his elevation to the District of Columbia Circuit.

Proctor was nominated by President Harry S. Truman on February 2, 1948, to an Associate Justice seat on the United States Court of Appeals for the District of Columbia (Judge of the United States Court of Appeals for the District of Columbia Circuit from June 25, 1948) vacated by Associate Justice Harold Montelle Stephens. He was confirmed by the Senate on March 2, 1948, and received his commission on March 5, 1948. His service terminated on September 17, 1953, due to his death.

== Sources ==
Legal offices
Preceded by William Hitz	Associate Justice of the District Court of the United States for the District of Columbia; 1931–1948	Succeeded by Edward Allen Tamm
Preceded by Harold Montelle Stephens	Judge of the United States Court of Appeals for the District of Columbia Circuit; 1948–1953	Succeeded by John A. Danaher
