= Henry White Edgerton =

American judge (1888–1970)

Henry W. Edgerton
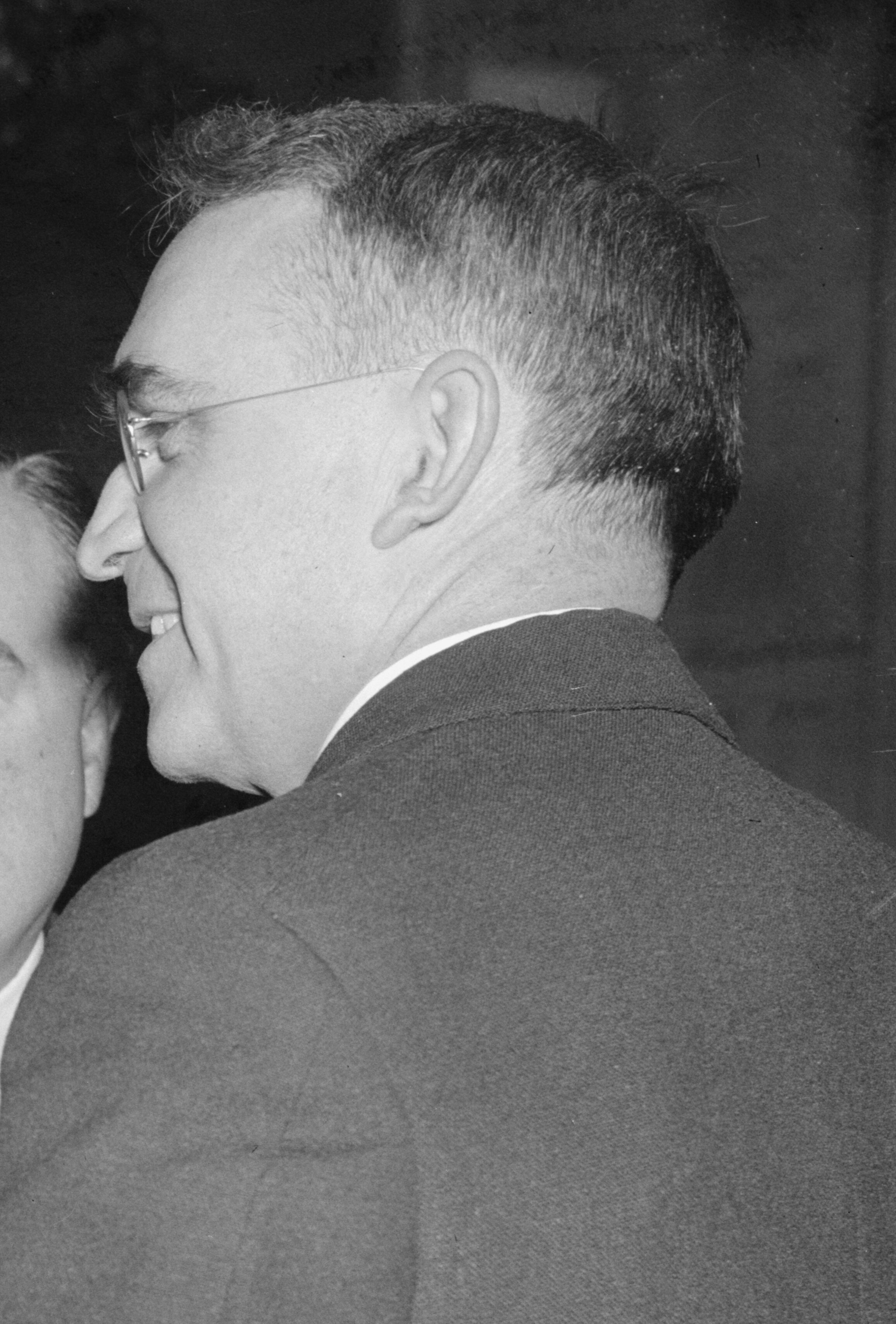
- Edgerton in 1937

Senior Judge of the United States Court of Appeals for the District of Columbia Circuit
- In office April 22, 1963 – February 23, 1970

Chief Judge of the United States Court of Appeals for the District of Columbia Circuit
- In office May 28, 1955 – October 20, 1958
- Preceded by: Harold Montelle Stephens
- Succeeded by: E. Barrett Prettyman

Judge of the United States Court of Appeals for the District of Columbia Circuit
- In office December 15, 1937 – April 22, 1963
- Appointed by: Franklin D. Roosevelt
- Preceded by: Duncan Lawrence Groner
- Succeeded by: Carl E. McGowan

Personal details
- Born: Henry White Edgerton; October 20, 1888 Rush Center, Kansas, U.S.
- Died: February 23, 1970 (aged 81) Washington, D.C., U.S.
- Education: Cornell University (AB); Harvard Law School (LLB)

Henry White Edgerton (October 20, 1888 – February 23, 1970) was a United States circuit judge of the United States Court of Appeals for the District of Columbia Circuit.

== Education and career ==
Born in Rush Center, Kansas, Edgerton received an Artium Baccalaureus degree from Cornell University in 1910, and a Bachelor of Laws from Harvard Law School in 1914. He then entered private practice as an attorney, first in Saint Paul, Minnesota in 1914, and then in Boston, Massachusetts from 1915 until 1916. Edgerton was a professor at Cornell Law School from 1916 until 1918, when he returned to private practice in Boston. In 1921, he took a teaching position at the George Washington University Law School, where he published a much-cited article, "Legal Cause," staking out a legal realist position on causation in the law. In 1928, Edgerton moved to Cornell University, where he taught until 1937. While at Cornell, Edgerton served as Special Assistant to the United States Attorney General from 1934 until 1935, during Franklin D. Roosevelt's first term as President.

== Federal judicial service ==
Edgerton was nominated by President Franklin D. Roosevelt on November 26, 1937, to an Associate Justice seat on the United States Court of Appeals for the District of Columbia (Judge of the United States Court of Appeals for the District of Columbia Circuit from June 25, 1948) vacated by Associate Justice Duncan Lawrence Groner. He was confirmed by the United States Senate on December 9, 1937, and received his commission on December 15, 1937. He served as Chief Judge and as a member of the Judicial Conference of the United States from May 28, 1955 to October 20, 1958. He assumed senior status on April 22, 1963. His service terminated on February 23, 1970, due to his death in Washington, D.C.

== Sources ==
Legal offices
Preceded by Duncan Lawrence Groner	Judge of the United States Court of Appeals for the District of Columbia Circuit; 1937–1963	Succeeded by Carl E. McGowan
Preceded by Harold Montelle Stephens	Chief Judge of the United States Court of Appeals for the District of Columbia Circuit; 1955–1958	Succeeded by E. Barrett Prettyman
