= E. Barrett Prettyman =

American judge (1891–1971)

Barrett Prettyman
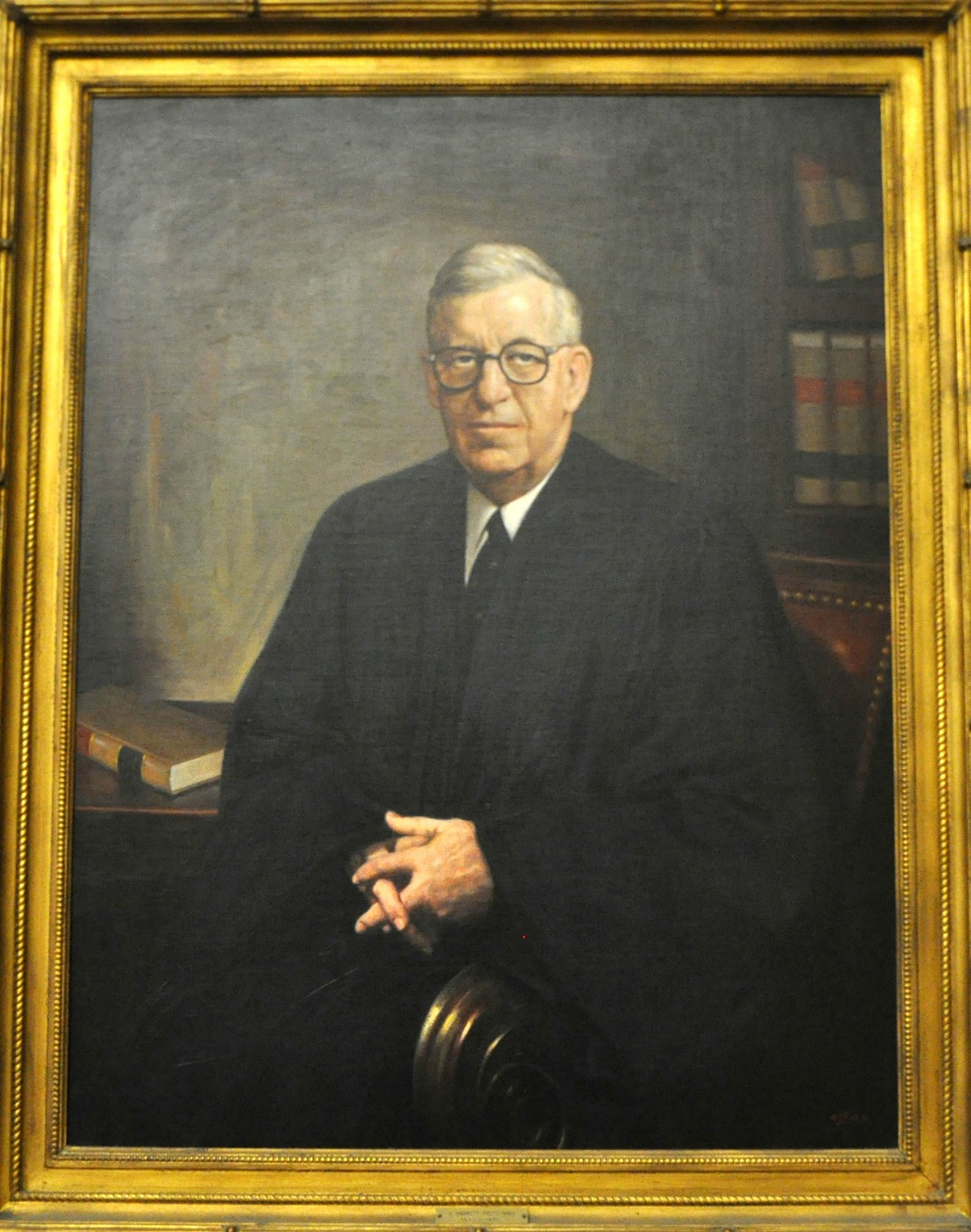

Senior Judge of the United States Court of Appeals for the District of Columbia Circuit
- In office April 16, 1962 – August 4, 1971

Chief Judge of the United States Court of Appeals for the District of Columbia Circuit
- In office October 20, 1958 – October 21, 1960
- Preceded by: Henry White Edgerton
- Succeeded by: Wilbur Kingsbury Miller

Judge of the United States Court of Appeals for the District of Columbia Circuit
- In office September 28, 1945 – April 16, 1962
- Appointed by: Harry S. Truman
- Preceded by: Justin Miller
- Succeeded by: J. Skelly Wright

Corporation Counsel of the District of Columbia
- In office 1934–1936
- President: Melvin Hazen
- Preceded by: William Bride
- Succeeded by: Elwood Seal

Personal details
- Born: Elijah Barrett Prettyman; August 23, 1891 Lexington, Virginia, U.S.
- Died: August 4, 1971 (aged 79) Washington, D.C., U.S.
- Resting place: Rockville Cemetery
- Education: Randolph-Macon College (BA, MA); Georgetown University (LLB)

Elijah Barrett Prettyman (August 23, 1891 – August 4, 1971) was a United States circuit judge of the United States Court of Appeals for the District of Columbia Circuit. His son was American attorney E. Barrett Prettyman Jr.

== Education and career ==
Born on August 23, 1891, in Lexington, Virginia, Prettyman went to school in Washington, D.C. and Baltimore, Maryland. He worked as an evenings and weekends sports correspondent for The Baltimore American, and a police reporter for The Baltimore Sun, from 1905 to 1907. He received a Bachelor of Arts degree in 1910 from Randolph–Macon College and an Artium Magister degree in 1911 from the same institution. He received a Bachelor of Laws in 1915 from Georgetown Law. He entered private practice in Hopewell, Virginia from 1915 to 1917.

Prettyman was a United States Army Captain during World War I from 1917 to 1919. Although he was commissioned as an artillery captain, he also served as a judge advocate where he oversaw hundreds of courts-martial. He was a special attorney for the Bureau of Internal Revenue of the United States Department of the Treasury in Washington, D.C., and New York City, New York from 1919 to 1920. He was in private practice in Chicago, Illinois, Washington, D.C., and New York City from 1920 to 1933.

Prettyman was general counsel for the Bureau of Internal Revenue from 1933 to 1934. He was corporation counsel for Washington, D.C., from 1934 to 1936. He was in private practice in Washington, D.C., and Hartford, Connecticut, from 1936 to 1945. He was a professor of taxation at Georgetown from 1931 to 1946, and they awarded him an LLD in 1946. In 1961, both Randolph-Macon and the William Mitchell College of Law awarded him LLDs.

== Federal judicial service ==
Prettyman was nominated by President Harry S. Truman on September 12, 1945, to an Associate Justice seat on the United States Court of Appeals for the District of Columbia (United States Circuit Judge of the United States Court of Appeals for the District of Columbia Circuit from June 25, 1948) vacated by Judge Justin Miller. He was confirmed by the United States Senate on September 24, 1945, and received his commission on September 28, 1945. He served as Chief Judge from October 20, 1958 to October 21, 1960. While serving as Chief Judge, he notably delivered an opinion in Worthy v. Herter (1959) stating that the State Department can limit the right to travel of American citizens, regarding an American correspondent in China. He assumed senior status on April 16, 1962.

Prettyman was a chairman of the Judicial Conference of the United States from 1959 to 1960, and was known for advocating for court expansion and improving juvenile adjudication. He helped establish the Public Defender Service for the District of Columbia. President John F. Kennedy nominated him to chair a panel inquiring into the 1960 U-2 incident, and he chaired a committee under President Lyndon B. Johnson to study the feasibility of phasing out VA hospitals. He established a program at Georgetown University to provide better legal assistance to indigent clients.

Prettyman died at his home in Washington on August 4, 1971, at the age of 79. He was buried at Rockville Cemetery in Rockville, Maryland. He was survived by his wife and two children.

== Honors ==
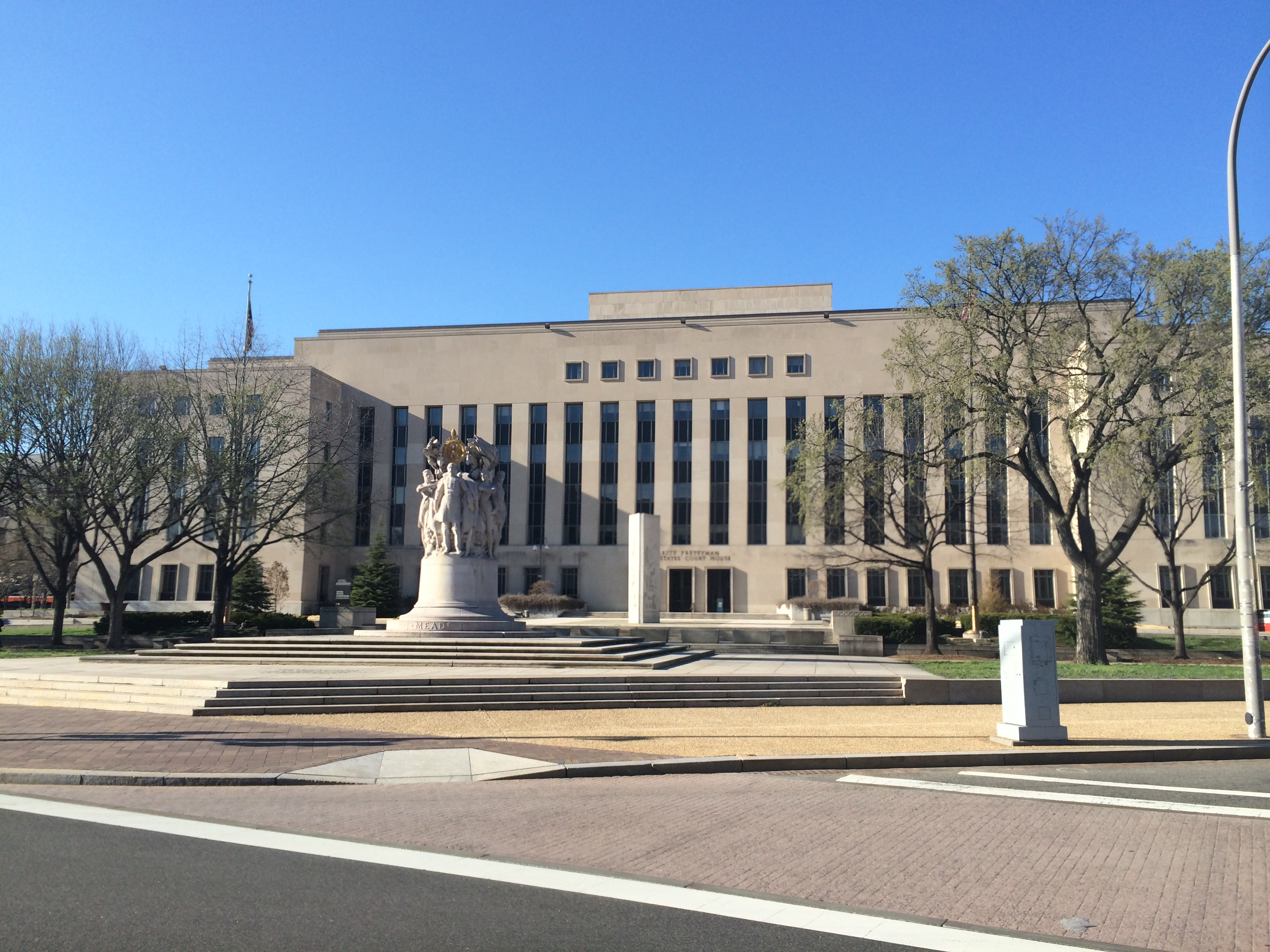
E. Barrett Prettyman Federal Courthouse

In March 1997, the E. Barrett Prettyman Federal Courthouse in Washington, D.C., was named in his honor. This courthouse is home to the U.S. District Court for the District of Columbia, Court of Appeals for the District of Columbia Circuit, and Foreign Intelligence Surveillance Court.

== Sources ==
- A Tribute to a Champion of the Law: U.S. Courthouse Named After Longtime Appellate Judge (The Washington Post, March 27, 1997) at Prettyman family site

Legal offices
Preceded by William Bride	Corporation Counsel of the District of Columbia; 1934–1936	Succeeded by Elwood Seal
Preceded by Justin Miller	Judge of the United States Court of Appeals for the District of Columbia Circuit; 1945–1962	Succeeded by J. Skelly Wright
Preceded by Henry White Edgerton	Chief Judge of the United States Court of Appeals for the District of Columbia Circuit; 1958–1960	Succeeded by Wilbur Kingsbury Miller
