= Quinn Tamm =

FBI official (1910–1986)

- Born: August 10, 1910; Seattle, Washington, U.S.
- Died: January 23, 1986 (aged 75); Washington, D.C., U.S.
- Education: University of Virginia (BS)
- Occupation: FBI official
- Years active: 1934–1960s
- Employer(s): FBI; IACP
- Spouse: Ora Belle
- Children: Thomas Tamm
- Relatives: Edward Allen Tamm (brother)

Quinn Tamm (August 10, 1910 – January 23, 1986) was an assistant director for the Federal Bureau of Investigation, and then later an influential executive director of the International Association of Chiefs of Police (IACP). Tamm's older brother Edward Allen Tamm was also an FBI official and later a federal judge.

== Early life ==
Quinn Tamm was born on August 10, 1910, in Seattle, Washington and grew up in Butte, Montana. He graduated with a BS from the University of Virginia.

== Career ==
=== FBI ===
In 1934, Tamm entered the FBI (four years after his brother) as a messenger. He became a special agent in 1936, assigned to the FBI Laboratory. By 1938, he had become what was the youngest person promoted to inspector.

In 1941, Tamm led an investigation that led to the establishment of the FBI Disaster Squad. On August 31, 1941, an airplane crashed in Lovettsville, Virginia, some 60 miles west-northwest of Washington. Two on board were FBI employees. Mr. Tamm led the FBI team to identify victims and claim their official and personal effects. By fingerprinting victims, Tamm and team were able to compare them to FBI fingerprint cards in FBI files and identify 11 of the 25 passengers.

Tamm worked the Identification Division for 17 years until moving up to assistant director of the Training and Inspection Division in 1951. In 1954, he became a series of further roles as assistant director for the Laboratory Division, Identification Division, Training and Inspection Division, and back to the Laboratory Division, where he remained until retirement.

During his tenure as assistant director, Tamm had a tumultuous relationship with FBI Director J. Edgar Hoover. As liaison to the IACP, Tamm received instructions from Hoover to influence their activities. For since, Hoover ordered him to manipulate election of major police officers, e.g., ensuring the defeat of William Parker, chief of the Los Angeles Police Department, in favor of a "virtual unknown".

In 1961, Tamm resigned from the FBI, where he was assistant of its Laboratory Division. The FBI Law Enforcement Bulletin noted his retirement date of January 23, 1961, "after 26 years of dedicated service" and quoted a letter from Hoover:

Your career in the FBI has been a very distinguished one. Very few men have served the Bureau and the overall interests of law enforcement with the devotion and the talent that have characterized your efforts. I am most grateful to you.

The Bureau also noted "Mr. Tamm has accepted the position of director of the Field Services Division of the International Association of Chiefs of Police, a division which he was instrumental in having the IACP establish. Mr. Tamm feels that this particular division can make a major contribution to law enforcement in this country."

=== IACP ===
In 1961 or 1962, Tamm became executive director of the IACP (founded 1893). Hoover tried to stop Tamm from joining the IACP; when IACP leadership confirmed his position at a 1962 national convention, Tamm declared that he would make the IACP "the dominant force in law enforcement." Tamm also modernized it: he "turned it from a genial club to a highly expert organization." When Tamm joined the IACP they had six full-time staff in makeshift offices. By 1968, Time noted:

Quinn Tamm, 58, is not a policeman at all, but he is one of the most influential voices for police reform in the country. He has been behind most of the chiefs' innovations and has been a prime mover in efforts to interest the colleges in crime and college men in crime fighting. A former assistant director of the FBI, Tamm became executive director of the International Association of Chiefs of Police in 1961, quickly turned it from a genial club into a highly expert organization that not only trains police administrators but, on request of city governments, studies individual departments. Its recommendations are rarely ignored. Since the I.A.C.P.'s jolting indictment of the Baltimore force in 1965, every top cop in the country has learned to judge his department in terms of not only what it has done to curb crime but, more importantly, what it should be doing to adjust to the problems of a fast-changing and impatient society.

In 1965, Tamm oversaw a year-long study into crime in the nation's capital for the DC Crime Commission; four years later, he criticized city government for its "amazing resistance" to act on those recommendations. At the time of Watts riots, also in 1965, Tamm told 3,000 law enforcement officials meeting in Miami Beach:

We are tired of sociologists, psychiatrists, militant civil rights leaders and others intoning that because people are deprived and resentful of authority they should be understood when they kill, destroy millions of dollars in property, commit arson, loot and pillage...
We are tired of the cry that because one segment of our population has been deprived for 100 years, the balance of society must accept 100 years of anarchy. We are tired of the notion that certain causes are sacrosanct and that their rights transcend the law.

In 1967, Time magazine noted Tamm's improvements:

Now there are 70 on the staff, and the association has its own building. The white-haired, leathery-faced Tamm, 57, has placed particular emphasis on upgrading the training and community image of police. With the help of various public and private grants, the I.A.C.P. this year alone has run 33 two-week courses for supervisory personnel and has provided consultant services to the community relations programs of 20 departments.

In 1968, the New Yorker noted how Tamm "has been able to make the IACP into an important advocate for 'professionalization' of the police." On the other hand, the magazine noted, "Privately, Calif chiefs... were appalled by the Chicago police work at the Democratic convention, which they saw on TV."

In 1975, Tamm left the IACP and became a consulting expert on law enforcement.

In 1977, Tamm appeared on the MacNeil/Leher Report (now PBS NewsHour) on the topic of DOJ indictments of FBI agents as a result of a New York Times story on "illegal break‐ins, mail openings and wiretaps committed by F.B.I. agents in New York between 1971 and 1973 while pursuing radical fugitives". Tamm said:

I think this question of indictment of FBI agents goes far beyond the agent and the small individual represented by the first indictment. In order to present my case, might I point out that I'm rather unique in the fact that I am speaking in defense of the FBI because of my previous relationship with J. Edgar Hoover, the Director, and the fact that I was the first person, probably, in this country to actively criticize and oppose J. Edgar Hoover for some of the things he was doing. But I have a great and tremendous respect for the FBI organization and the people in it. I think they are being singled out; I can't understand why, but I noticed that the Department of Justice on January the fourteenth offered all sorts of explanation as to why they had not prosecuted CIA for the same, identical reasons or crime that the FBI is now being accused of in the same period of time...
I think it was a plausible reason years ago when Hoover was alive, but I do not think it's a plausible reason now. I think that the FBI is completely and totally under the control of the Attorney General and the Department of Justice. But that goes back to the point that the FBI agents who are now being accused of these crimes were doing them under order from the officials in the government. And the position taken by the Department of Justice in the CIA case was the fact that there was no firm program delineating the extent to which people could go in cases of national security or foreign threats; and for a variety of reasons of that type the Department decided not to prosecute CIA agents. And they said in part: "In such circumstances prosecution takes on an air of hypocrisy and may appear to be the sacrifice of a scapegoat, and to reach down into the middle of the echelon of the FBI and to ignore the upper echelon of government." And this goes into the White House, it goes into the Attorneys General, it goes into the Congress and the Senators.

== Personal life and death ==
Quinn married Ora Belle, a secretary in the FBI Identification Division; they had two children, one of whom is Thomas Tamm.

J. Edgar Hoover considered Tamm a personal threat to his law enforcement power and personally considered Tamm to be his third most hated enemy (after Robert F. Kennedy and Martin Luther King Jr.).

Quinn Tamm died age 75 on January 23, 1986, in Washington, D.C. at Washington Suburban Hospital after suffering a heart attack. He was buried in Maryland at the Chevy Chase United Methodist Church, Chevy Chase, County of Montgomery, Maryland.

== Works ==
Articles

- "Handling Disaster Problems Is Law Enforcement Task," FBI Law Enforcement Bulletin (1957)

== See also ==
- Thomas Tamm
- Edward Allen Tamm

== External sources ==
- MacNeil/Lehrer Report - "Possible FBI Indictment" (video of Quinn Tamm start 00:11.40) (May 10, 1977)
- FBI files - Quinn Tamm
