= Edward Allen Tamm =

FBI official and federal judge (1906–1985)

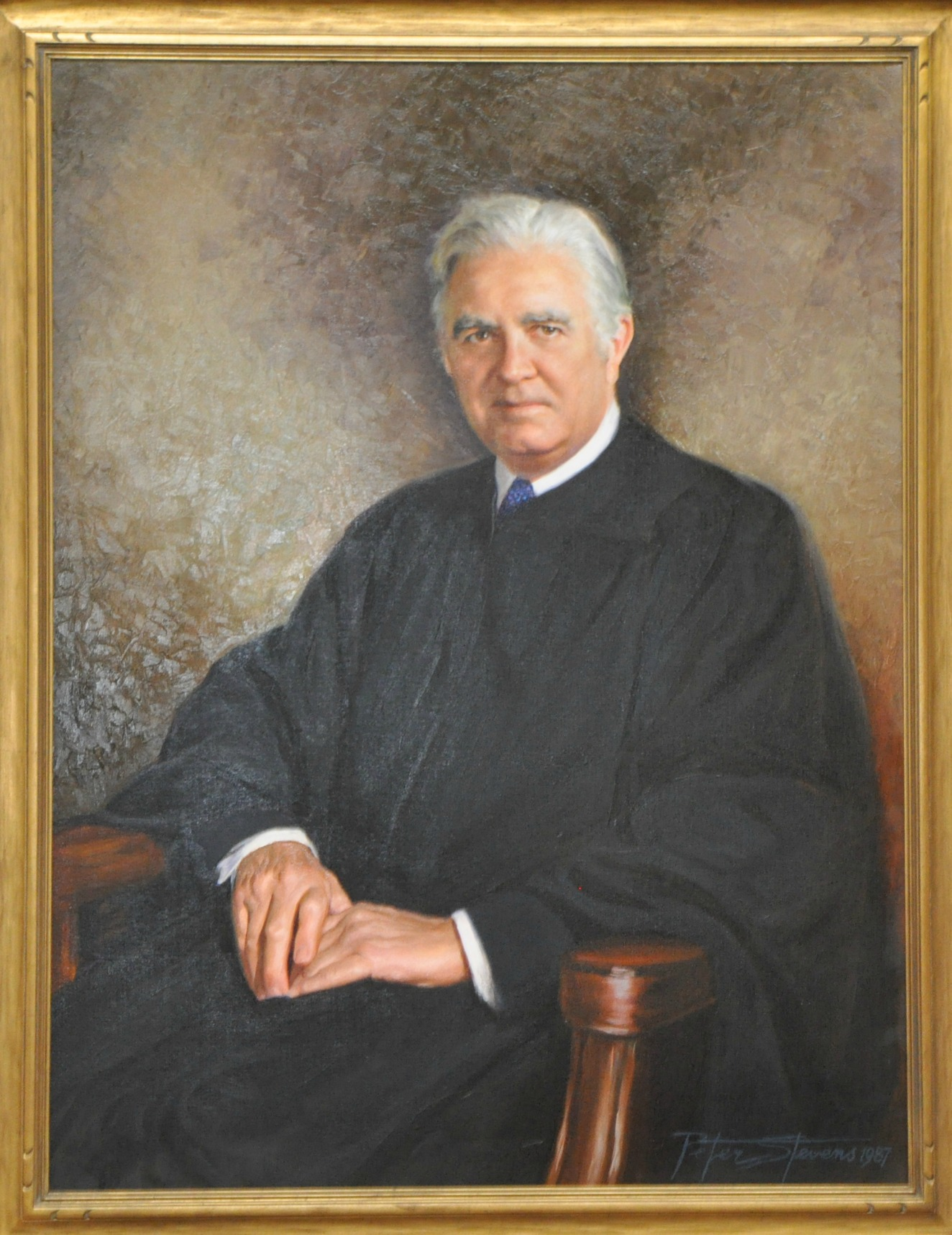

Judge of the United States Court of Appeals for the District of Columbia Circuit
- In office March 11, 1965 – September 22, 1985
- Appointed by: Lyndon B. Johnson
- Preceded by: Walter M. Bastian
- Succeeded by: James L. Buckley

Judge of the United States District Court for the District of Columbia
- In office June 22, 1948 – March 11, 1965
- Appointed by: Harry S. Truman
- Preceded by: James McPherson Proctor
- Succeeded by: Oliver Gasch

Personal details
- Born: Edward Allen Tamm; April 21, 1906 Saint Paul, Minnesota, U.S.
- Died: September 22, 1985 (aged 79) Washington, D.C., U.S.
- Education: Georgetown University (LLB)
- Nickname: E.A. Tamm

Edward Allen Tamm (typically "E.A. Tamm" in FBI files, sometimes "Edward Tamm") (April 21, 1906 – September 22, 1985) worked for the Federal Bureau of Investigation (FBI), reaching the third-highest position as Assistant to the Director (J. Edgar Hoover) before accepting an appointment as a United States district judge of the United States District Court for the District of Columbia and then United States circuit judge of the United States Court of Appeals for the District of Columbia Circuit.

== Early life and education ==
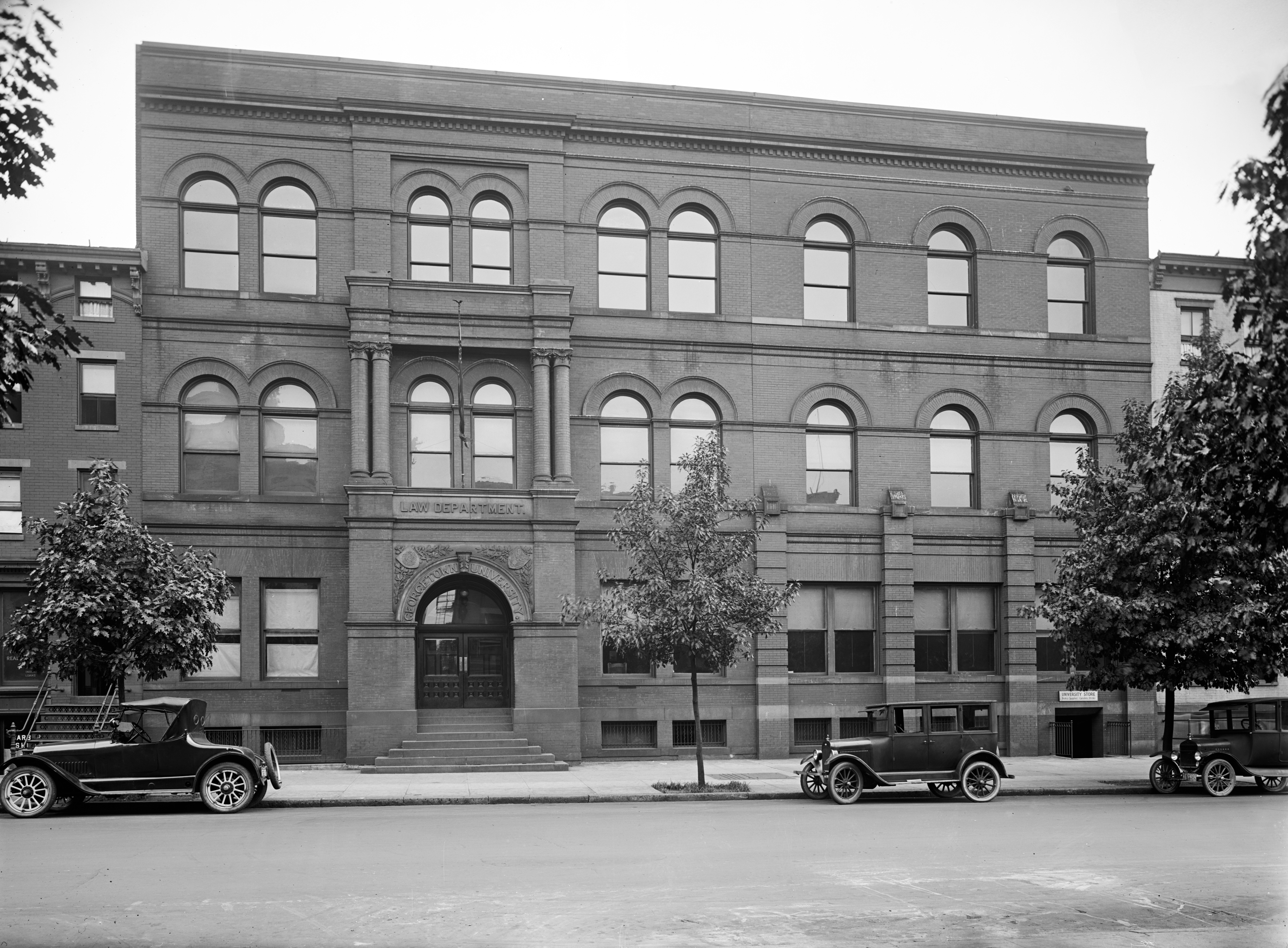
Georgetown University Law School (circa 1910-1925), where Tamm first studied law

Edward Allen Tamm was born on April 21, 1906, in Saint Paul, Minnesota. His parents were Edward Allen Tamm and Lucille Catherine Buckley. In 1925, Tamm studied at St. Charles College of Helena, Montana. In 1930, he received an LLB from Georgetown University Law School.

== Career ==
In 1928, Tamm arrived in Washington, where he attended Georgetown University Law School and graduated in 1930.

=== FBI ===
In 1930, Tamm joined what was then the Bureau of Information (and in 1935 became the FBI) as a special agent. In 1934, he became a special assistant to the FBI Director. In 1940, he became the Assistant to the Director, second only to Clyde Tolson. In 1945, Tamm served as FBI "special adviser" in the US delegation to the United Nations Conference on International Organization.

In his 2009 book The FBI and the Catholic Church, 1935-1962, author Steve Rosswurm devoted a chapter to Tamm. Rosswurm credits Tamm, "the FBI's highest-ranking Catholic, in forging the alliance" between the FBI and the Catholic Church during the 1930s and 1940s.

(On May 5, 1949, Hoover appointed D.M. Ladd to Tamm's Number 3 position of Assistant to the Director. Ladd took over "supervision of all the FBI's investigative activities in both criminal and subversive fields.")

=== Federal judicial service ===
On June 22, 1948, Tamm received a recess appointment from US President Harry S. Truman to a seat on the United States District Court for the District of Columbia vacated by Judge James McPherson Proctor. On January 13, 1949, Truman nominated him to the same position; on March 29, 1949, the United States Senate confirmed him; and on April 1, 1949, he received his commission. (Congress subsequently reorganized the court. His service terminated on March 16, 1965, due to elevation to the D.C. Circuit.) That court dealt also heard cases for the District of Columbia "normally... tried before state courts" and appointed the DC school board.

On March 1, 1965, US President Lyndon B. Johnson appointed Tamm as an associate justice of the federal District Court of the United States for the District of Columbia, a seat vacated by Walter M. Bastian. On March 11, 1965, the Senate confirmed him, and on March 11, 1965, he received his commission. He served until his death in 1985.

At the time of his elevation, the Washington Post retracted concern from 1949 as to whether a high-level FBI official would serve well as a judge:

[Tamm] has won general recognition as a trial judge of great fairness and firmness. His devotion to the law and his understanding of it have been enriched by his experience on the bench. He has thoroughly earned elevation, and there is every reason to expect that he will be a discerning and dedicated appellate judge.

In 1977, as the Washington Post noted, Tamm:

set aside an FCC ruling that seven words (referring to such things as various sexual activities and portions of the female anatomy) could not by aired by radio. He wrote that the FCC order carried the agency into the 'forbidden realm of censorship." He also pointed out that the broadcasting ban would prohibit the airing, not only of the George Carlin record in question, but certain of Shakespeare's plays, portions of the Bible, works of a long list of prominent authors, "and the Nixon tapes".

In 1981, Tamm "made headlines... when he took his own profession to task" for a growing backlog of judicial work building up, with "his own court the biggest federal offender" and recommended a statute to deny salary to federal judges failing to dispose of cases "within 60 days after the date of the hearing."

Tamm also served as Chief Judge of the Temporary Emergency Court of Appeals from 1972 to 1981.

== Personal life and death ==
On January 30, 1934, Tamm married Grace Monica Sullivan; they had two surviving children.

Tamm's younger brother Quinn Tamm also served as an FBI officer.

Tamm served as a trustee of Saint Joseph College, board member of the Police Boys Club of Washington, D.C., and lieutenant commander in the United States Naval Reserve.

Other associations included: American Bar Association (member advisory committee on judges function 1969-1985, special committee on prevention and control crime 1969-1985), Federal Bar Association, District of Columbia Bar Association (honorary), American Law Institute, American Judicature Society, Metropolitan Board Trade, United States Coast Guard Auxiliary, Blessed Sacrament Catholic Church, Friendly Sons of St. Patrick, United States Power Squadron, Sons Union Vets, John Carroll Society, President's Cup Regatta Association, Columbia Country Club, Gourmet Society, La Confrerie des Chevaliers du Tasterin, Confrerie de la Chaine des Rotisseurs.

Edward Allen Tamm died age 79 on September 22, 1985, of cancer at his home in Washington, D.C.

== Awards and recognition ==
- 1971: Honorary Doctorate, Suffolk University Law School
- 1980: Honorary Doctor of Laws, New York Law School

In its obituary, the Washington Post noted:

During his years on the appeals bench, the U.S. Circuit Court here became a leading force in the protection of defendants' rights. And if the former FBI agent did not always concur with the court's liberal wing, he often was seemingly guided by a common-sense approach to the case at hand.

== Legacy ==
In 1995, Georgetown University created an annual "Tamm Memorial Award" of $300 with plaque for best student writing on the Georgetown Law Journal, created Supreme Court Chief Justice and Mrs. Warren Burger."

== See also ==
- J. Edgar Hoover
- Clyde Tolson
- D.M. Ladd
- List of United States federal judges by longevity of service

== External sources ==
- Historical Society of the D.C. Circuit: Edward Allen Tamm
- Historical Society of the D.C. Circuit: Portrait of Edward Allen Tamm
- Open Jurist: Edward Allen Tamm

Legal offices
| Preceded by James McPherson Proctor | Judge of the United States District Court for the District of Columbia; 1949–1965 | Succeeded by Oliver Gasch |
| Preceded by Walter M. Bastian | Judge of the United States Court of Appeals for the District of Columbia Circuit; 1965–1985 | Succeeded by James L. Buckley |
| New office | Chief Judge of the Temporary Emergency Court of Appeals; 1972–1981 | Succeeded by J. Skelly Wright |
