= 1932 United States Senate election in Connecticut =

- November 8, 1932
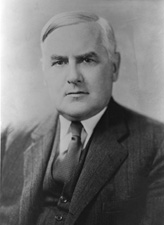

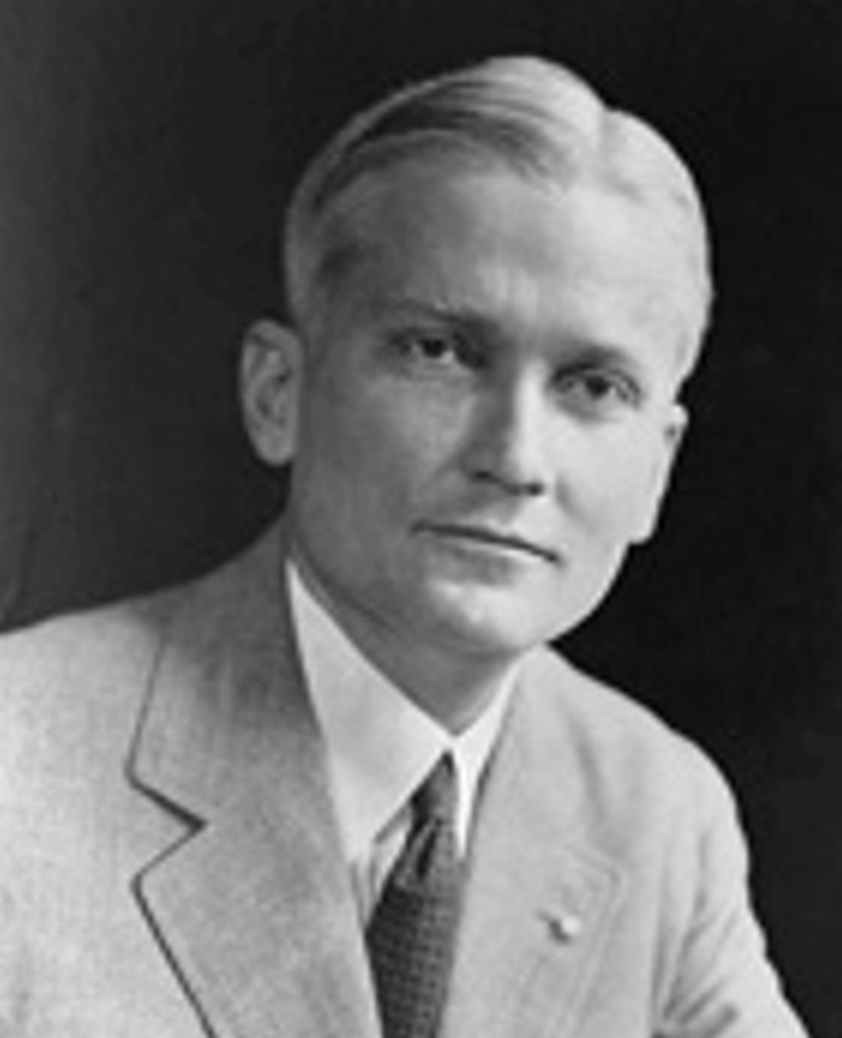
Nominee	Augustine Lonergan	Hiram Bingham III
Party	Democratic	Republican
Popular vote	282,327	278,061
Percentage	47.50%	46.78%
- Lonergan: 40–50% 50–60% 60–70% Bingham: 40–50% 50–60% 60–70% 70–80% 80–90% Tie: 50%
U.S. senator before election
Hiram Bingham III
Republican
Elected U.S. Senator
Augustine Lonergan
Democratic

The 1932 United States Senate election in Connecticut was held on November 8, 1932. Incumbent Senator Hiram Bingham III ran for a second full term in office but was defeated by Democratic U.S. Representative Augustine Lonergan. This was the first time since 1879 that Democrats won this Senate seat, and the first since 1881 that they won either seat.

This was despite the fact that Connecticut was one of only six states President Herbert Hoover carried in his landslide defeat by Franklin D. Roosevelt. Lonergan won the seat as one of twelve gains made by the Democrats in 1932.

== Republican nomination ==
The Republican Party met in convention in New Haven on September 7 and nominated a unanimous ticket, including Senator Bingham.

== Democratic nomination ==
=== Candidates ===
- Harry Morgan Ayres, Columbia University professor of English literature
- Augustine Lonergan, U.S. Representative from Hartford and nominee in 1920 and 1928
- Francis T. Maloney, Mayor of Meriden

=== Campaign ===
Entering the September 7 convention at Groton, the Democratic Party was split between supporters of the presidential campaigns of Al Smith, who had carried the Connecticut delegation in April, and Franklin D. Roosevelt, who had won the nomination in July. In the Senate race, the Roosevelt faction backed professor Harry Morgan Ayres while the Smith faction supported Francis T. Maloney. In the event of deadlock, State Senator Michael Connor said he would present Thomas Hewes, a member of the staff of Governor Wilbur Cross, as a compromise.

=== Convention ===
Lonergan was successful at the convention, aligning himself with the pro-Smith "old guard" faction over the pro-Roosevelt "new guard."

== General election ==
=== Candidates ===
- Devere Allen, editor of The World Tomorrow (Socialist)
- Hiram Bingham III, incumbent Senator since 1924 (Republican)
- Milton Conover, Yale University professor of political science (Independent Republican)
- John L. Grennan (Socialist Labor)
- Augustine Lonergan, U.S. Representative from Hartford (Democratic)
- William Secker (Communist)

=== Campaign ===
Bingham campaigned as a "wet," or anti-Prohibitionist, Republican in an effort to win Democratic votes. In April, Bingham blamed Prohibition as indirectly responsible for the Lindbergh kidnapping, which he believed to be the work of associates of Al Capone. In July, Senator George W. Norris of Nebraska commented on Bingham's persistent proposals to legislate the repeal of Prohibition, "If he dies and goes to Heaven, as I know he will, and St. Peter opens the gates, the Senator from Connecticut will refuse to go in unless he has a bottle of beer under his arm." He also campaigned as an opponent of paper money and free silver and a proponent of the Hoover administration.

Bingham's opposition to Prohibition led Milton Conover, a Yale professor and vigorous defender of the preservation and enforcement of the Eighteenth Amendment, to enter the race.

=== Results ===
On Election Day, Lonergan narrowly unseated Bingham. Conover's 10,621 votes were more than double the number separating the incumbent Bingham from victory.

1932 U.S. Senate election in Connecticut
Party	Candidate	Votes	%	±%
Democratic	Augustine Lonergan	282,327	47.50%	▲11.94
Republican	Hiram Bingham III (incumbent)	278,061	46.78%	▼16.53
Socialist	Devere Allen	19,774	3.33%	▲2.28
Independent Republican	Milton Conover	10,621	1.79%	N/A
Socialist Labor	John L. Grennan	2,243	0.38%	N/A
Communist	William Secker	1,376	0.23%	N/A
Total votes		556,853	100.0%	
Democratic gain from Republican		Swing		

== See also ==
- 1932 United States Senate elections
