= Harry Ayres =

Harry Ayres may refer to:

- Harry Ayres (footballer) (1920–2002), English footballer
- Harry Ayres (mountaineer) (1912–1987), New Zealand mountaineer
- Harry Morgan Ayres (1881–1948), professor of English Literature at Columbia University
