= 1928 United States Senate election in Connecticut =

- November 6, 1928
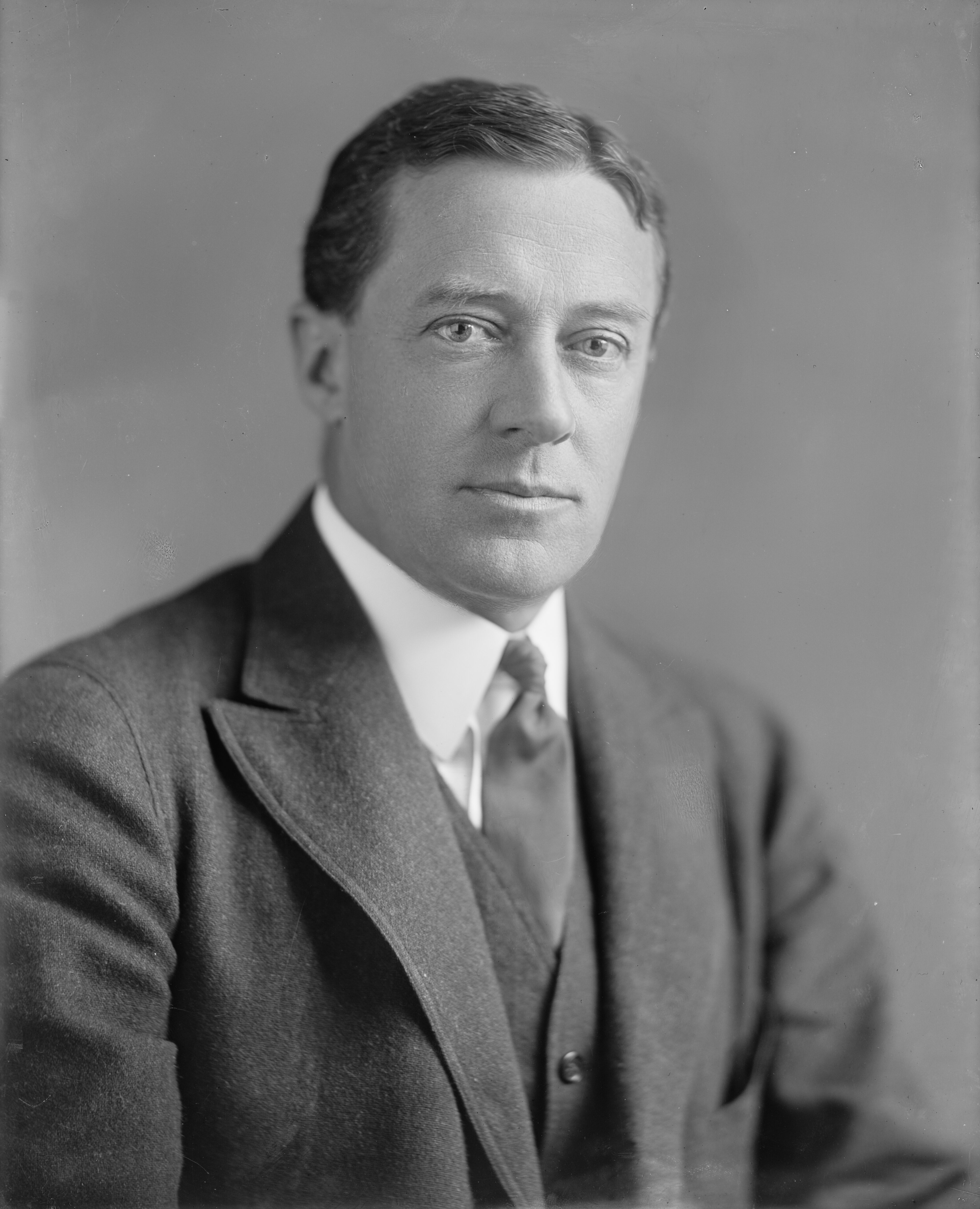

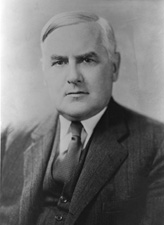
Nominee	Frederic C. Walcott	Augustine Lonergan
Party	Republican	Democratic
Popular vote	296,958	251,429
Percentage	53.86%	45.60%
- Wolcott: 50–60% 60–70% 70–80% 80–90% Lonergan: 50–60% 60–70% 70–80%
U.S. senator before election
George McLean
Republican
Elected U.S. Senator
Frederic C. Walcott
Republican

The 1928 United States Senate election in Connecticut was held on November 6, 1928. Incumbent Republican Senator George P. McLean was not a candidate for re-election. In his place, Republican State Senator Frederic C. Walcott won the seat against former U.S. Representative Augustine Lonergan.

== General election ==
=== Candidates ===
- Augustine Lonergan, former U.S. Representative from Hartford
- Martin F. Plunkett (Socialist)
- Frederic C. Walcott, State Senator from Norfolk (Republican)

=== Results ===
1928 U.S. Senate election in Connecticut
Party	Candidate	Votes	%	±%
Republican	Frederic C. Walcott	296,958	53.86%	▲1.52
Democratic	Augustine Lonergan	251,429	45.14%	▼0.33
Socialist	Martin F. Plunkett	3,014	0.55%	▼1.08
Total votes		551,401	100.00%	
Republican hold				

== Aftermath ==
Lonergan would win an election to Connecticut's other Senate seat in 1932; he and Walcott served as colleagues in the Senate from 1933 to 1935.
