= Augustine Lonergan =

American politician (1874–1947)

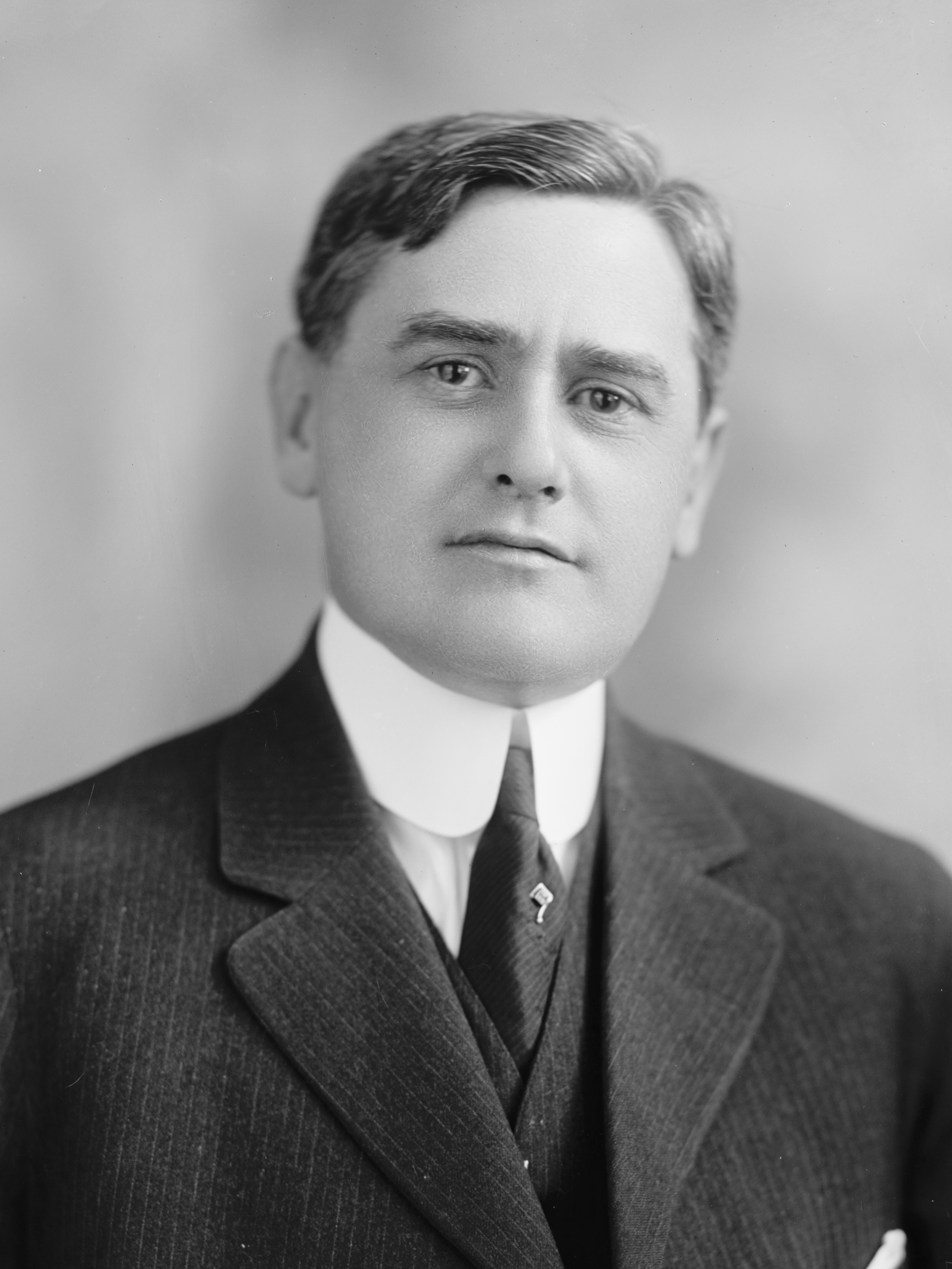

United States Senator from Connecticut
- In office March 4, 1933 – January 3, 1939
- Preceded by: Hiram Bingham III
- Succeeded by: John A. Danaher

Member of the U.S. House of Representatives from Connecticut's 1st district
- In office March 4, 1913 – March 3, 1915
- Preceded by: E. Stevens Henry
- Succeeded by: P. Davis Oakey
- In office March 4, 1917 – March 3, 1921
- Preceded by: P. Davis Oakey
- Succeeded by: E. Hart Fenn
- In office March 4, 1931 – March 3, 1933
- Preceded by: E. Hart Fenn
- Succeeded by: Herman P. Kopplemann

Personal details
- Born: May 20, 1874 Thompson, Connecticut, U.S.
- Died: October 18, 1947 (aged 73) Washington, D.C., U.S.
- Party: Democratic
- Spouse: Lucy Gardiner Waters

Augustine John Lonergan (May 20, 1874 – October 18, 1947) was a U.S. senator and representative from Connecticut. He was a member of the Democratic Party. He served as a senator from 1933 to 1939.

== Biography ==
Lonergan was born in Thompson, Connecticut, to a father from Ireland and a Canadian mother of Irish descent. He attended the public schools in Rockville and Bridgeport and graduated from Yale Law School in 1902. He was admitted to the bar in 1901 and practiced law in Hartford, Connecticut. He was a members of the city planning commission and was assistant corporation counsel of Hartford from 1910 to 1912.

After a failed campaign in 1910, Lonergan was elected as a Democrat to the U.S. House of Representatives from Connecticut's 1st congressional district in 1912, serving from March 4, 1913, to March 3, 1915. He was an unsuccessful candidate for reelection in 1914 but was reelected in 1916 and 1918, serving again from March 4, 1917, to March 3, 1921. He 1920, he ran for the U.S. Senate against incumbent Frank B. Brandegee, losing heavily, and ran again in 1928, losing to Republican nominee Frederic C. Walcott. He was again elected to the House in 1930 and served from March 4, 1931, to March 3, 1933. He was elected to the Senate in 1932, narrowly defeating Hiram Bingham III amidst the Democrat landslide that year, and served one term from March 4, 1933, to January 3, 1939. He was defeated for reelection by Republican John A. Danaher in 1938.

Lonergan practiced law in Washington, D.C. until his death on October 18, 1947. He was interred at Mount St. Benedict's Cemetery in Hartford.

Party political offices
| Preceded by Simeon E. Baldwin | Democratic nominee for U.S. Senator from Connecticut (Class 3); 1920 | Succeeded by Hamilton Holt |
| Preceded by Thomas J. Spellacy | Democratic nominee for U.S. Senator from Connecticut (Class 1); 1928 | Succeeded by Francis T. Maloney |
| Preceded by Rollin U. Tyler | Democratic nominee for U.S. Senator from Connecticut (Class 3); 1932, 1938 | Succeeded by Brien McMahon |
U.S. House of Representatives
| Preceded by E. Stevens Henry | Member of the U.S. House of Representatives from Connecticut's 1st congressional district 1913 – 1915 | Succeeded by P. Davis Oakey |
| Preceded by P. Davis Oakey | Member of the U.S. House of Representatives from Connecticut's 1st congressional district 1917 – 1921 | Succeeded by E. Hart Fenn |
| Preceded by E. Hart Fenn | Member of the U.S. House of Representatives from Connecticut's 1st congressional district 1931 – 1933 | Succeeded by Herman P. Kopplemann |
U.S. Senate
| Preceded by Hiram Bingham III | U.S. senator (Class 3) from Connecticut; 1933 – 1939; Served alongside: Frederic C. Walcott, Francis T. Maloney | Succeeded by John A. Danaher |
