= Padelford =

Padelford is a surname. Notable people with the surname include:

- Devin Padelford (born 2003), American soccer player
- Edward Padelford (1799–1870), American businessman
- Frederick Morgan Padelford (1875–1942), American professor and author
- Seth Padelford (1807–1878), American politician
