= 1920 United States Senate election in Connecticut =

- November 2, 1920
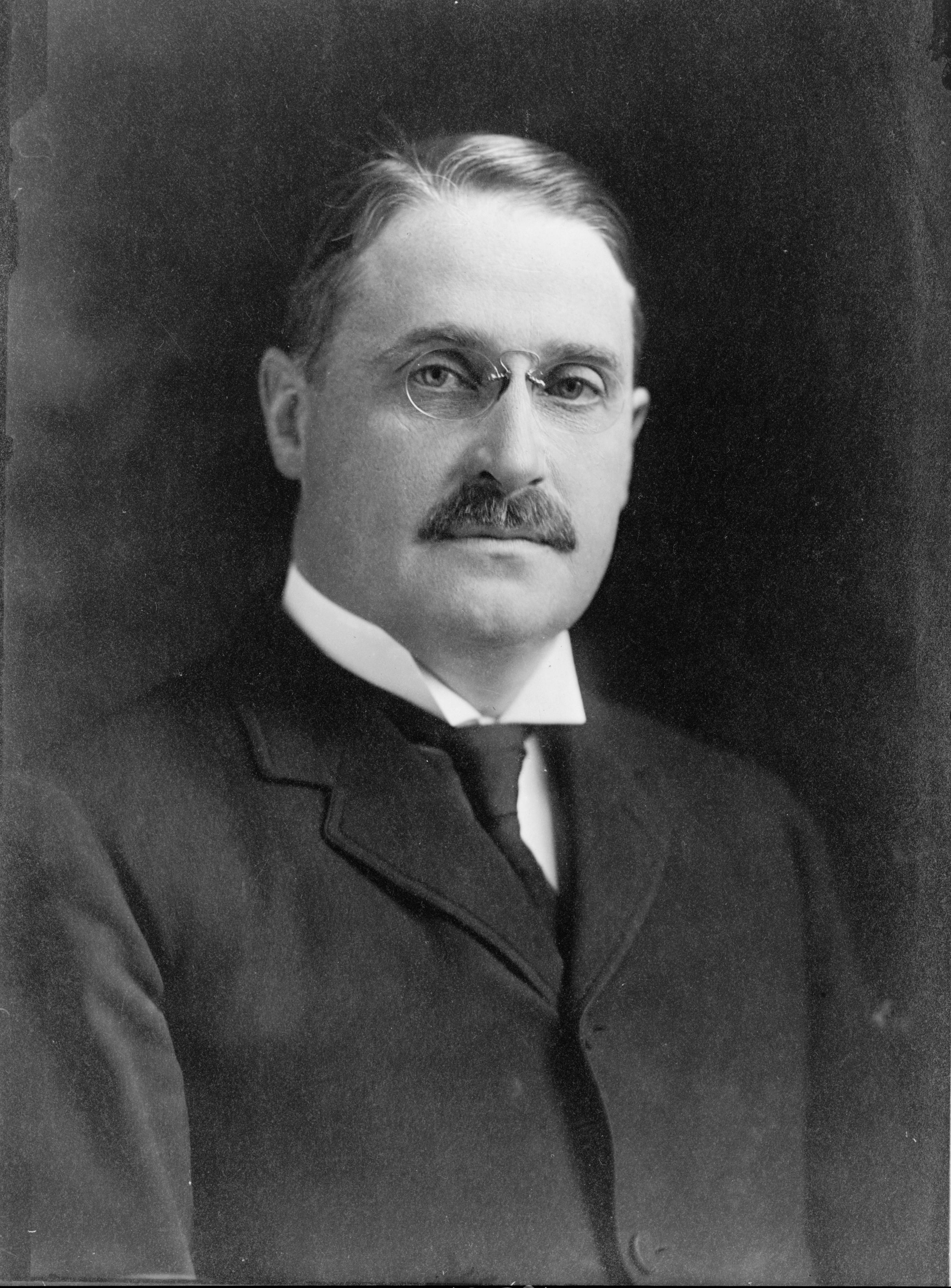

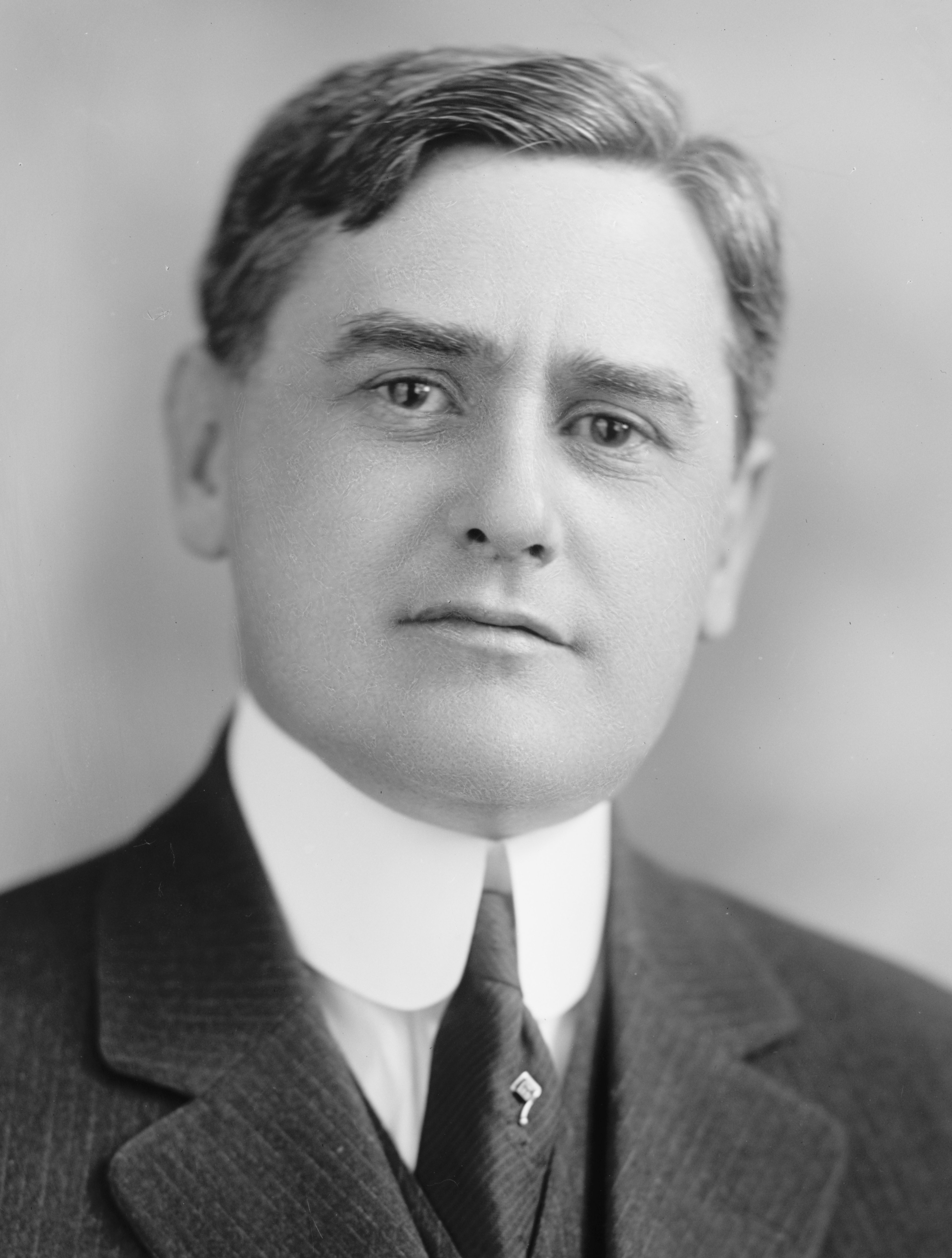
Nominee	Frank B. Brandegee	Augustine Lonergan
Party	Republican	Democratic
Popular vote	216,792	131,824
Percentage	59.36%	36.10%
- Brandegee: 40–50% 50–60% 60–70% 70–80% 80–90% 90–100% Lonergan: 40–50% 50–60% 60–70%
U.S. senator before election
Frank B. Brandegee
Republican
Elected U.S. Senator
Frank B. Brandegee
Republican

The 1920 United States Senate election in Connecticut was held on November 2, 1920.

Incumbent Senator Frank B. Brandegee was re-elected to a second term in office over Democratic U.S. Representative Augustine Lonergan.

== Democratic nomination ==
=== Candidates ===
- Augustine Lonergan, U.S. Representative from Hartford

==== Declined ====
- Homer Stille Cummings, Chairman of the Democratic National Committee, former mayor of Stamford, and nominee for Senate in 1916

=== Campaign ===
For much of the campaign into September, Homer Stille Cummings appeared to be the likely Democratic nominee. He had the backing of President Woodrow Wilson and Democratic presidential nominee James M. Cox. However, following the Republican landslide in Maine on September 13, Cummings demurred.

=== Convention ===
At the convention, Cummings openly declared that he would decline to be a candidate, citing health reasons. Instead, the party turned to two-term U.S. Representative Augustine Lonergan. The party platform endorsed the Wilson administration, women's suffrage, health insurance reform, state civil service reform, and agricultural aid in the state.

== General election ==
=== Candidates ===
- Charles J. Backofen (Socialist Labor)
- Josephine B. Bennett (Farmer-Labor)
- Frank B. Brandegee, incumbent Senator since 1905 (Republican)
- Emil L. G. Hohenthal (Prohibition)
- Augustine Lonergan, U.S. Representative from Hartford (Democratic)
- Martin F. Plunkett (Socialist)

=== Campaign ===
In advance of the campaign, Brandegee, worried about losing the new woman's vote, reversed his longtime opposition to women's suffrage. He argued for expedient ratification of the Nineteenth Amendment to the United States Constitution, in order to forestall bitterness by women. Nevertheless, he was opposed by the Connecticut Women's Suffrage Association, who mounted an active and well-funded campaign against him. Brandegee countered this campaign by stressing loyalty to the Republican Party and attributing his past votes as grounded in constitutionalism.

Before and during the campaign, Brandegee was an "irreconcilable" opponent of the Treaty of Versailles. In this fight, he had the strong support of the Connecticut Republican establishment, led by J. Henry Roraback and Governor Marcus Holcomb, as well as sections of the large Irish and Italian populations of the state, a usually Democratic bloc. He drew condemnation from a number of pro-treaty intellectuals, led by Irving Fisher, who formed the "Republicans and Independents Who Oppose the Re-election of Brandegee," a group composed mostly of school teachers, many of whom were associated with Yale University. The nomination of Lonergan, however, dampened this movement; he was tepid in his enthusiasm for the League of Nations.

Brandegee also praised state's rights, condemned Bolshevism and radicalism, and warned of the need for continued military preparedness.

Prohibition was not made an issue in the campaign, as both candidates opposed the Eighteenth Amendment. Union support for Lonergan did not materialize, in part due to ongoing factionalism within the state's labor movement.

=== Endorsements ===
Fellow Senators William Borah, Medill McCormick, Hiram Johnson, and Henry Cabot Lodge all campaigned in Connecticut for Brandegee, along with Nicholas Murray Butler. He was also endorsed by Albert Beveridge and Philander Knox.

Lonergan received support from Franklin D. Roosevelt, the Democratic nominee for vice president, who visited the state on September 17.

=== Results ===
1920 U.S. Senate election in Connecticut
Party	Candidate	Votes	%	±%
Republican	Frank B. Brandegee (incumbent)	216,792	59.36%	▲9.61
Democratic	Augustine Lonergan	131,824	36.10%	▼5.98
Socialist	Martin F. Plunkett	10,118	2.77%	▼0.49
Prohibition	Emil L. G. Hohenthal	2,892	0.79%	▲0.04
Farmer–Labor	Josephine B. Bennett	2,076	0.57%	N/A
Socialist Labor	Charles L. Backofen	1,486	0.41%	▲0.05
Total votes		365,188	100.0%	
Republican hold		Swing		

== See also ==
- 1920 United States Senate elections
