= Harold Israel =

American serviceman wrongly accused of murder

- Born: 1903
- Died: 1964 (aged 60–61)

Harold Israel (1903–1964) was an itinerant former serviceman wrongly accused of murdering a priest in Bridgeport, Connecticut, in 1924. The charges against Israel were dismissed by the prosecutor, Homer Stille Cummings, who later became Attorney General of the United States.

The case, which gained national attention, became the basis for a 1947 film by Elia Kazan, Boomerang!. The Israel prosecution was praised in the Wickersham Commission report on law enforcement in the United States, which criticized police interrogation methods.

== The case ==
=== The crime ===
Israel, a vagrant and former serviceman, was charged with the murder of Father Hubert Dahme, a popular Catholic priest, at the intersection of High and Main Street in downtown Bridgeport on the evening of Feb. 4, 1924. Twelve thousand people attended the funeral. Newspapers pressed authorities to find the killer, and police conducted an intense search for the perpetrator. Eight days later, Israel, who had been arrested in Norwalk, Connecticut on a gun-possession charge, was accused of the murder. He was described as a "transient indigent, and a person of low mentality of the moron type".

=== Prosecution ===
Homer Cummings, the prosecutor, said the evidence was so strong that "upon its face, at least, seemed well nigh a perfect case". Israel met the general physical description of the gunman, was in the vicinity at the time of the shooting, and was in possession of a gun that the police believe had been used in the crime, a black .32 caliber revolver. The police case included identifications by seven eyewitnesses, and Israel confessed to the crime, though he later recanted and protested his innocence.

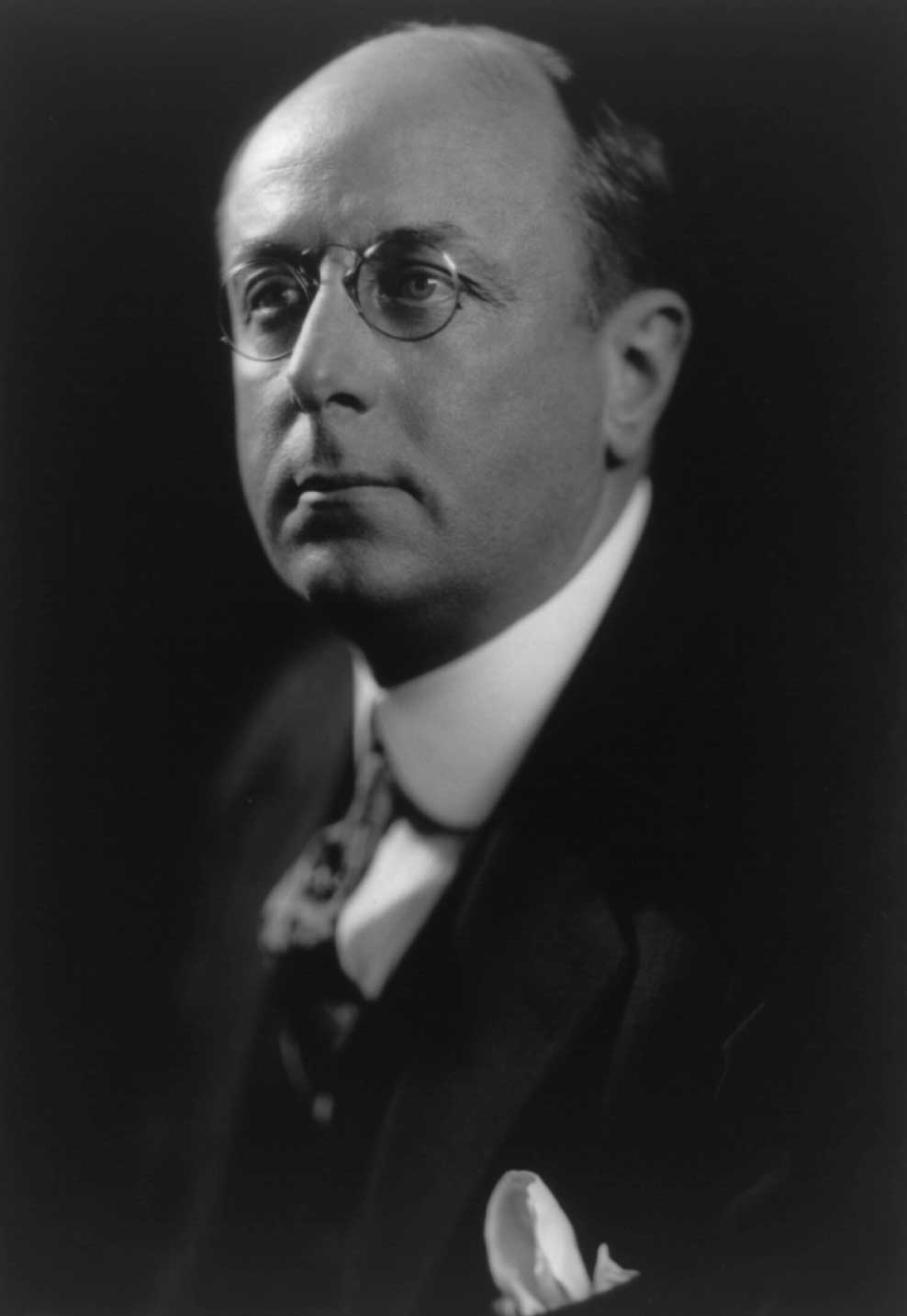
Prosecutor Homer Stille Cummings discredited his own police department's case against Israel

At arraignment on May 27, 1924, Cummings entered a declaration of nolle prosequi,, dropping the case, and proceeded to discredit the evidence compiled by the Bridgeport police in a 90-minute presentation to the court.

Cummings rebutted the circumstantial case against Israel, who was serving a 90-day jail term for possession of the .32 caliber revolver, and said that the confession was coerced from a person of diminished mental capacity. Three physicians had found that Israel was exhausted and overwhelmed, and Israel said he would have confessed to anything just to get some sleep. Cummings called expert witnesses who undermined the ballistics evidence.

Cummings told the court that "it is just as important for a state's attorney to use the great powers of his office to protect the innocent as it is to convict the guilty."

=== Backlash ===
Cummings' decision to drop the case surprised and outraged Bridgeport police, and Cummings received criticism from the Democratic Party, where he was a national committeeman. However, despite being snubbed by Franklin D. Roosevelt, former Assistant Secretary of the Navy, he was chosen by Roosevelt as his first Attorney General (after the sudden death of his first nominee Thomas J. Walsh).

=== Later vindication ===
The case was never solved. In 1954, a Bridgeport resident admitted to witnessing the killing, said that he was threatened with death if he spoke about it, and said that Israel was not the killer.

== Later life ==
Israel later married and had "a house, a Ford, a wife, and a child". In the 1947 movie Boomerang, which was largely filmed in Stamford, Connecticut, the character based on Israel was played by Arthur Kennedy.

== See also ==
- List of unsolved murders (1900–1979)
