= Peter Davis Oakey =

American politician (1861–1920)

P. Davis Oakey
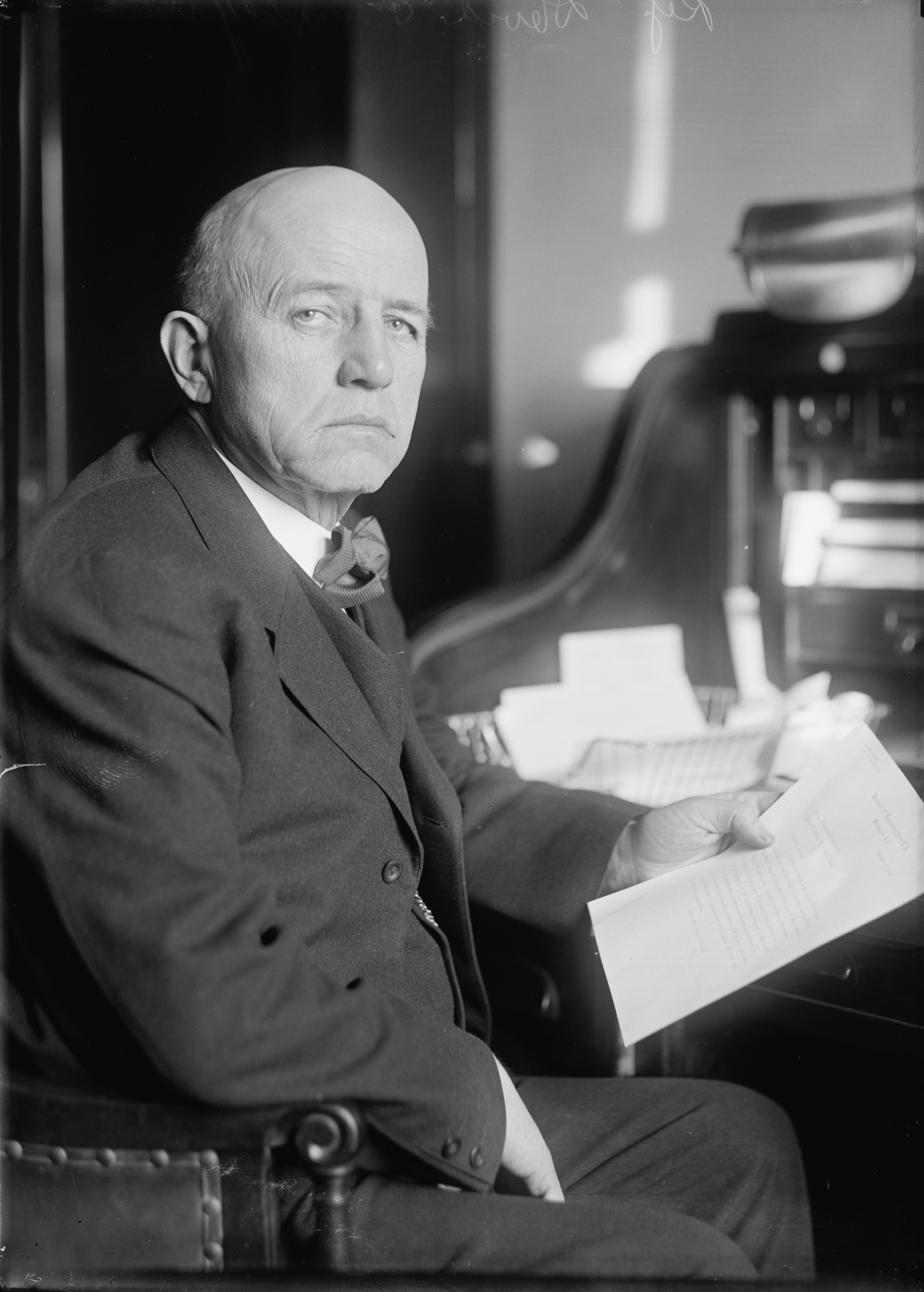
- Oakey circa 1916

Member of the U.S. House of Representatives from Connecticut's 1st district
- In office March 4, 1915 – March 3, 1917
- Preceded by: Augustine Lonergan
- Succeeded by: Augustine Lonergan

City Assessor of Hartford, Connecticut
- In office May 14, 1900 – February 28, 1915
- Preceded by: Samuel N. Benedict
- Succeeded by: August J. Meyer

Personal details
- Born: February 25, 1861 East Millstone, New Jersey
- Died: November 18, 1920 (aged 59) Hartford, Connecticut
- Resting place: Cedar Hill Cemetery, Hartford, Connecticut
- Party: Republican
- Spouse: Ada H. Chapin Garde (m. 1911)
- Parent(s): John L. Oakey; Sareh E. (Wilson) Oakey
- Occupation: Businessman; Public official

Peter Davis Oakey (February 25, 1861 – November 18, 1920), usually called P. Davis Oakey, was a businessman and government official from Connecticut. A Republican, he was most notable for his service in the United States House of Representatives from 1915 to 1917.

== Early life ==
Oakey was born in East Millstone, New Jersey on February 25, 1861, the son of Sareh E. (Wilson) Oakey and John L. Oakey. His father was a successful farmer and merchant who was prominent in local politics and government, including serving as a member of the New Jersey General Assembly. Oakey attended the public schools and high school of Millstone.

== Start of career ==
After completing his education, Oakey joined his father in the milling business, then operated a farm his father owned in Maryland. He moved to Hartford, Connecticut in 1886, where he managed first the Mapes Fertilizer Company, then the Hartford Lavine Company, a soap manufacturer. From 1891 to 1895, he was a reporter for the Hartford Courant.

He served as member of the city council in 1891–1894, and city alderman and collector of city taxes in 1894 and 1895. He was a member of the Connecticut National Guard from 1895 to 1901, and served as city assessor from 1900 to 1915. Oakey was active in Hartford's civic and fraternal life, and his memberships included the Freemasons, Templars, Shriners, Knights of Pythias, and Ancient Society of Foresters. In 1911, Oakey married Ada H. Chapin, the widow of William Henry Garde.

== U.S. House ==
Oakey was elected as a Republican to the Sixty-fourth Congress (March 4, 1915 – March 3, 1917). He was an unsuccessful candidate for reelection in 1916 to the Sixty-fifth Congress.

== Death and burial ==
He died in New Haven, Connecticut on November 18, 1920. He was interred in Cedar Hill Cemetery in Hartford.

U.S. House of Representatives
Preceded by Augustine Lonergan	Member of the U.S. House of Representatives from Connecticut's 1st congressional district 1915 – 1917	Succeeded by Augustine Lonergan
