= E. Hart Fenn =

American politician (1856–1939)

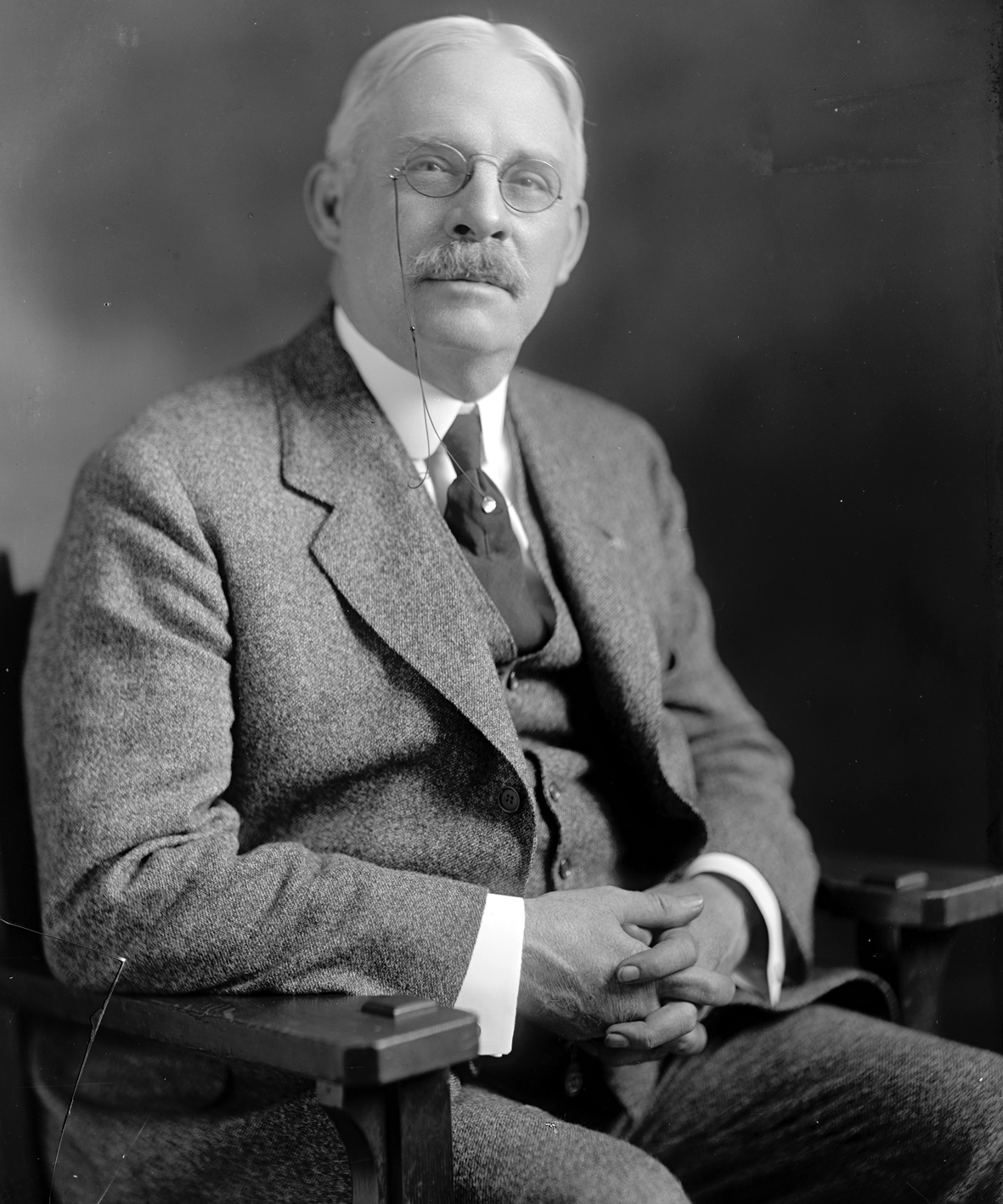

Member of the U.S. House of Representatives from Connecticut's 1st district
- In office March 4, 1921 – March 3, 1931
- Preceded by: Augustine Lonergan
- Succeeded by: Augustine Lonergan

Personal details
- Born: Edward Hart Fenn; September 12, 1856 Hartford, Connecticut, US
- Died: February 23, 1939 (aged 82) Washington, D.C., US resting_place = Spring Grove Cemetery, Hartford, Connecticut
- Party: Republican

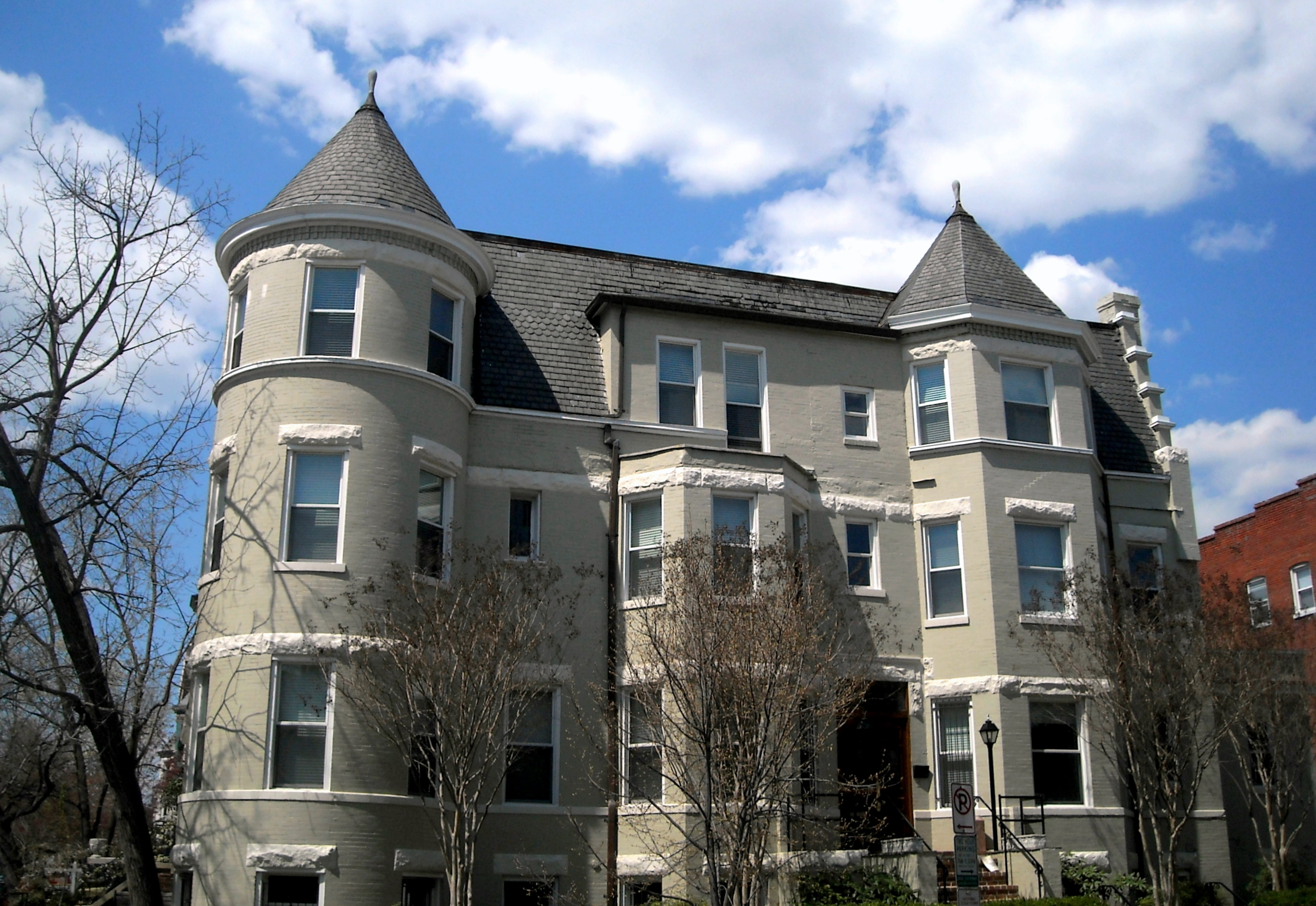
Edward Hart Fenn's former residence in Washington, D.C.

Edward Hart Fenn (September 12, 1856 – February 23, 1939) was an American newspaperman and politician who served five terms as a U.S. representative from Connecticut from 1921 to 1931.

== Biography ==
Born in Hartford, Connecticut, Fenn attended private schools, Hartford High School, and Yale University. Associated with the Hartford Post and the Hartford Courant as reporter, city editor, State editor, and special and editorial writer. Reported sessions of the Connecticut legislature from 1878 to 1908.

=== Early political career ===
He served as member of the State house of representatives in 1907 and 1915. He served in the State senate in 1909 and 1911. Fish and game commissioner 1912-1916. He served five years in the First Regiment of the Connecticut National Guard.

=== Congress ===
Fenn was elected as a Republican to the Sixty-seventh and to the four succeeding Congresses (March 4, 1921 – March 3, 1931). He served as chairman of the Committee on the Census (Sixty-ninth through Seventy-first Congresses). He was not a candidate for renomination in 1930.

== Retirement ==
He retired from public life and lived in Washington, D.C., and Wethersfield, Connecticut.

== Death ==
He died in Washington, D.C., on February 23, 1939. He was interred in Spring Grove Cemetery, Hartford, Connecticut.

U.S. House of Representatives
Preceded by Augustine Lonergan	Member of the U.S. House of Representatives from Connecticut's 1st congressional district 1921 – 1931	Succeeded by Augustine Lonergan
