= 1940 United States Senate election in Connecticut =

- November 5, 1940
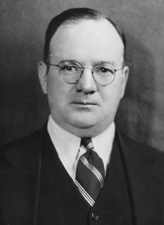

Nominee	Francis T. Maloney	Paul L. Cornell
Party	Democratic	Republican
Alliance		Union
Popular vote	416,740	358,313
Percentage	53.15%	45.70%
- Maloney: 40–50% 50–60% 60–70% Cornell: 50–60% 60–70% 70–80%
U.S. senator before election
Francis T. Maloney
Democratic
Elected U.S. Senator
Francis T. Maloney
Democratic

The United States Senate election of 1940 in Connecticut was held on November 5, 1940. Incumbent Democratic Senator Francis T. Maloney was re-elected to a second term in office. Maloney did not complete the term; he died in 1945. This was the first time that the Democrats were ever re-elected to the Senate from the state.

== General election ==
=== Candidates ===
- Paul L. Cornell (Republican and Union)
- James A. Hutchin (Socialist Labor)
- Francis T. Maloney, incumbent Senator since 1935 (Democratic)
- Kenneth W. Thurlow (Socialist)
- Isadore Wofsy (Communist)

=== Results ===
1940 U.S. Senate election in Connecticut
Party	Candidate	Votes	%	±%
Democratic	Francis T. Maloney (incumbent)	416,740	53.15%	▲4.74
Republican	Paul L. Cornell	357,574	45.60%	▲0.46
Union	Paul L. Cornell	798	0.10%	N/A
Total	Paul L. Cornell	358,313	45.70%	N/A
Socialist	Kenneth W. Thurlow	6,557	0.84%	▼5.10
Socialist Labor	James A. Hutchin	1,343	0.17%	N/A
Communist	Isadore Wofsy	1,114	0.14%	▼0.09
Total votes		784,067	100.00%	
Democratic hold				
