= 1916 United States Senate election in Connecticut =

- November 7, 1916
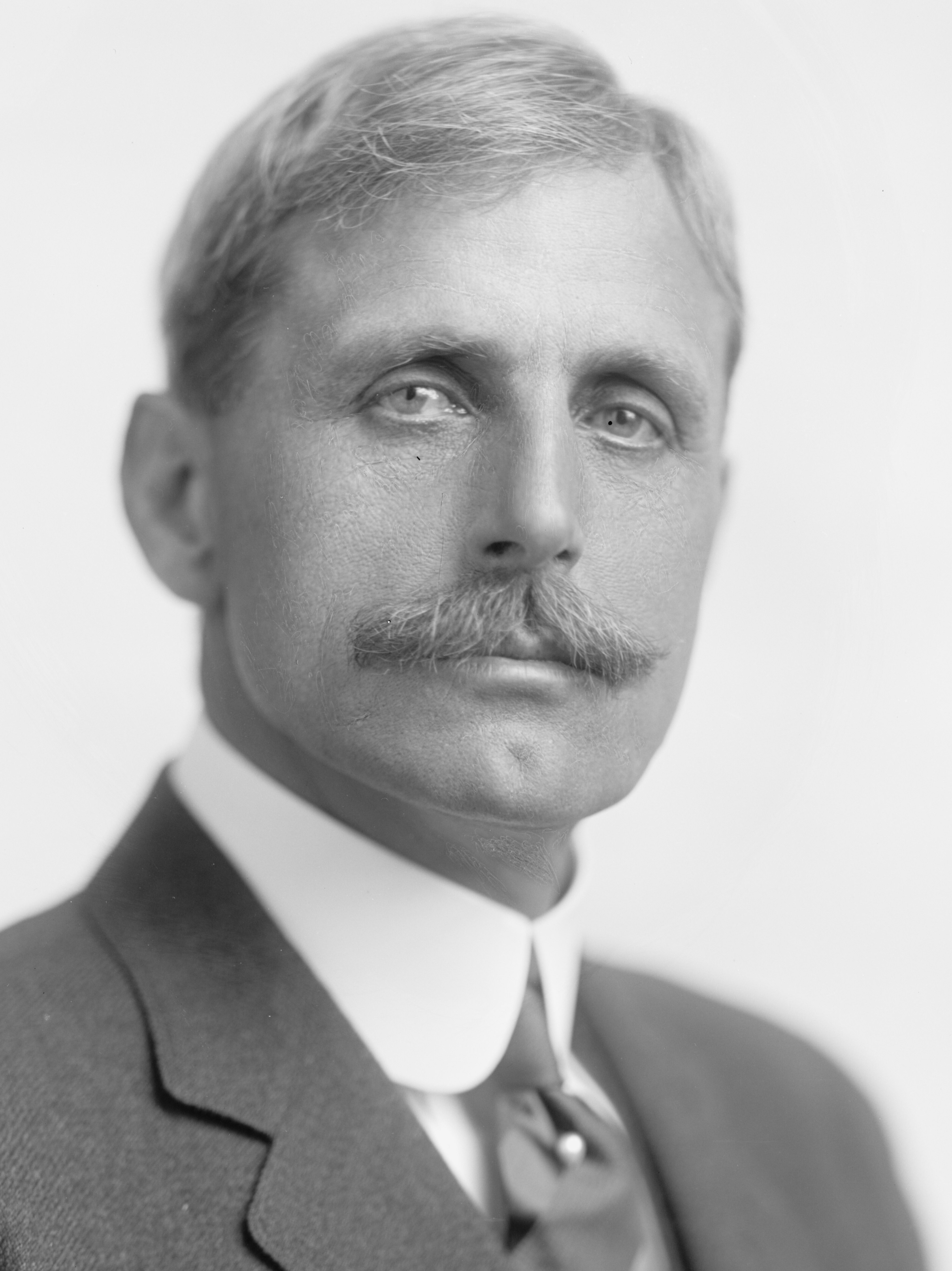

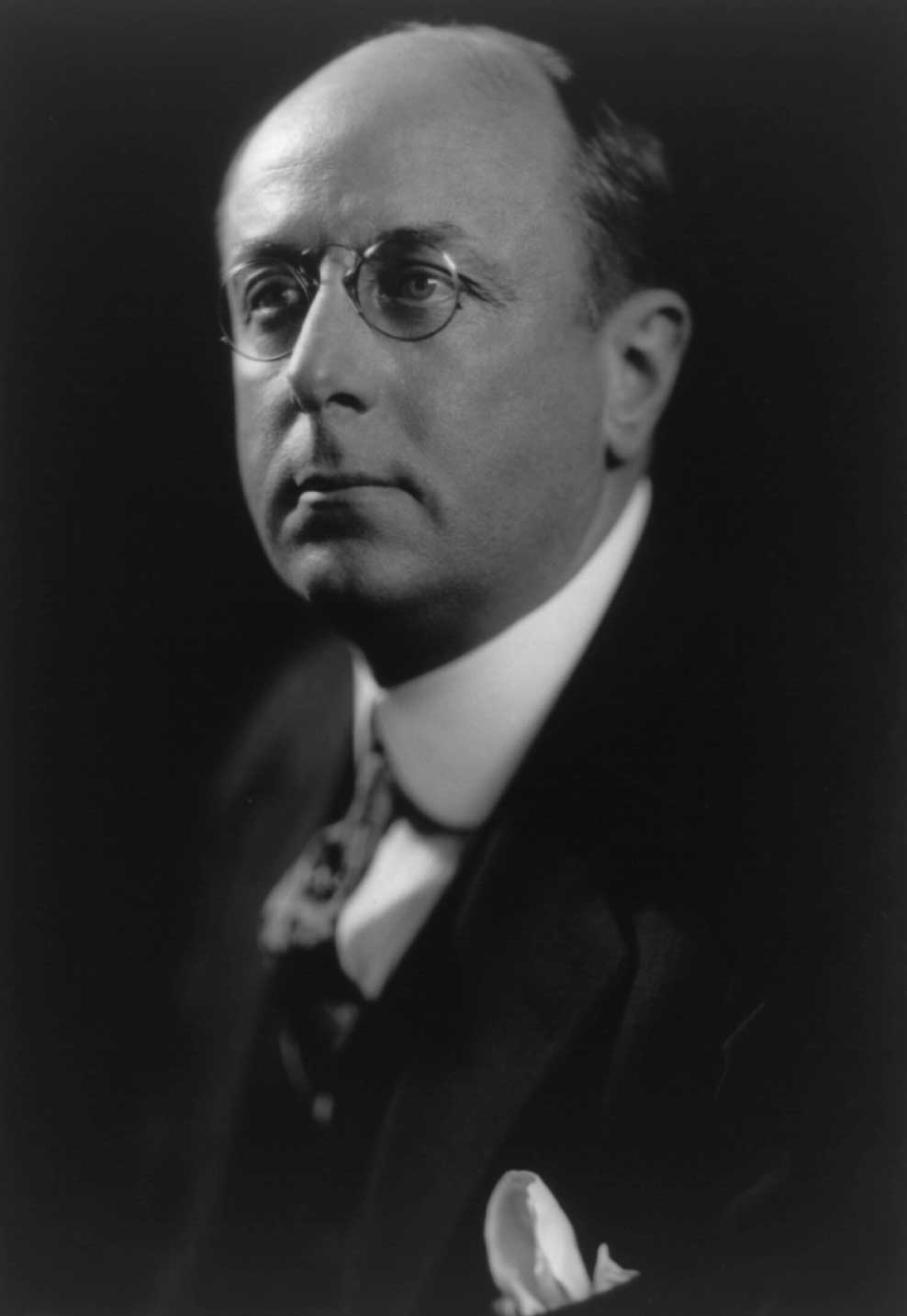
Nominee	George P. McLean	Homer Stille Cummings
Party	Republican	Democratic
Popular vote	107,020	98,649
Percentage	50.17%	46.24%
- McLean: 40–50% 50–60% 60–70% 70–80% 80–90% Cummings: 40–50% 50–60% 60–70%
U.S. senator before election
George P. McLean
Republican
Elected U.S. Senator
George P. McLean
Republican

The 1916 United States Senate election in Connecticut was held on November 7, 1916. Incumbent Republican Senator George P. McLean was re-elected to a second term in office over Democratic State Attorney Homer Stille Cummings.

== General election ==
=== Candidates ===
- Homer Stille Cummings, State Attorney for Hartford County and former Mayor of Stamford (Democratic)
- Wilbur G. Manchester (Prohibition)
- George P. McLean, incumbent Senator since 1911 (Republican)
- Martin F. Plunkett (Socialist)
- Otto Ruckser (Socialist Labor)

=== Results ===
1916 U.S. Senate election in Connecticut
Party	Candidate	Votes	%
Republican	George P. McLean (inc.)	107,020	50.17%
Democratic	Homer Stille Cummings	98,649	46.24%
Socialist	Martin F. Plunkett	5,279	2.48%
Prohibition	Wilbur G. Manchester	1,768	0.83%
Socialist Labor	Otto Ruckser	619	0.29%
Total votes		213,335	100.00%
Republican hold			
