= Padelford Hall =

Building at the University of Washington

Coordinates: 47.6570°N 122.3043°W

Padelford Hall is an academic building on the University of Washington campus in Seattle, Washington. Opened in 1967, it was awarded the American Institute of Architects Seattle merit award for design. The building, which holds the English Department and many other departments, is known for being the site of frequent student and staff protest.

It is named for Frederick Morgan Padelford, who taught in the university's English department and graduate school from 1901 to 1942.
