= 1934 United States Senate election in Connecticut =

- November 6, 1934
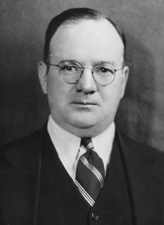

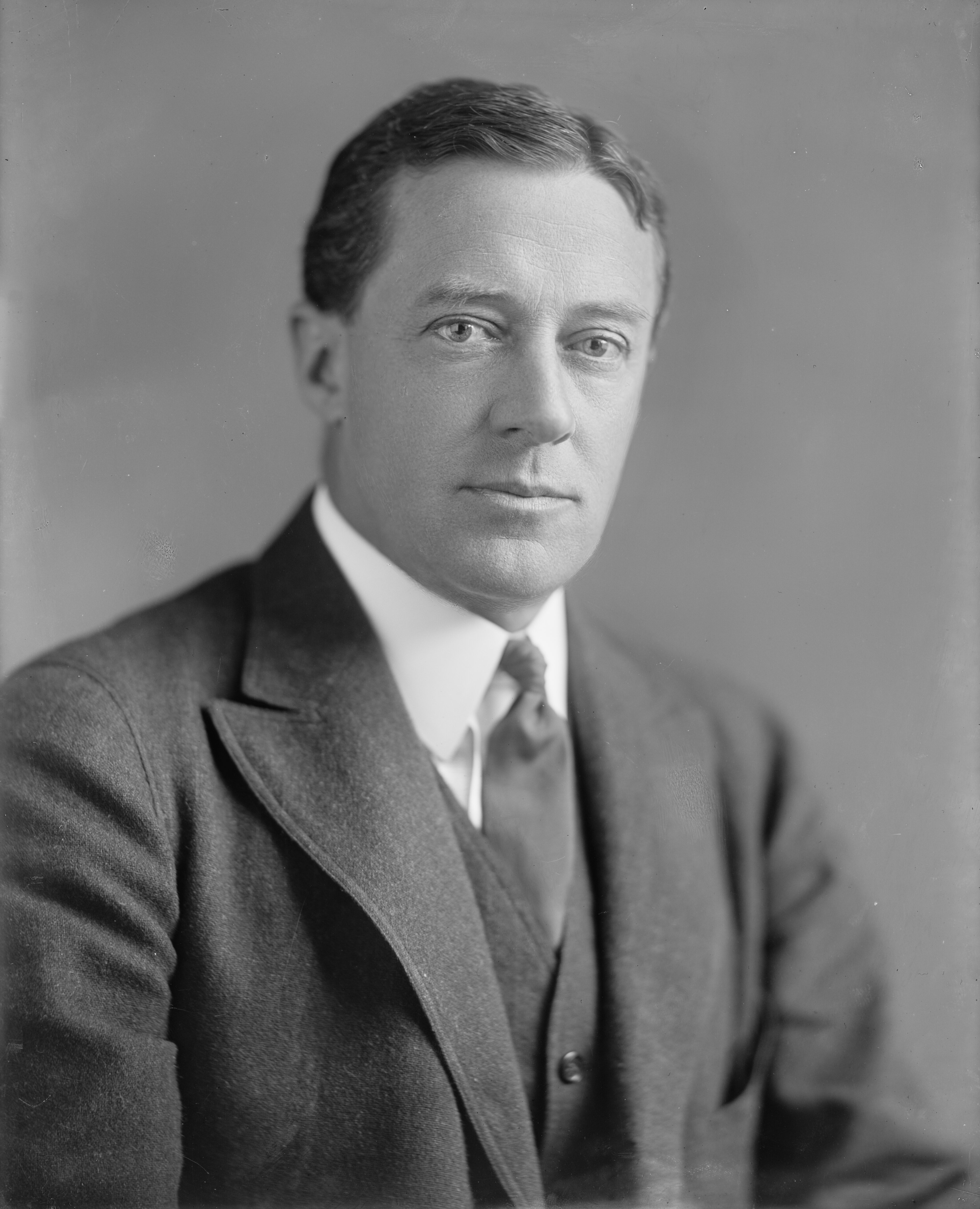
Nominee	Francis T. Maloney	Frederic C. Walcott
Party	Democratic	Republican
Popular vote	265,552	247,623
Percentage	51.75%	48.25%
- Maloney: 50–60% 60–70% Walcott: 50–60% 60–70% 70–80% 80–90%
U.S. senator before election
Frederic C. Walcott
Republican
Elected U.S. Senator
Francis T. Maloney
Democratic

The 1934 United States Senate election in Connecticut was held on November 6, 1934. Incumbent Republican Senator Frederic C. Walcott ran for re-election to a second term, but was defeated by Democratic U.S. Representative Francis T. Maloney.

== General election ==
=== Candidates ===
- Francis T. Maloney, U.S. Representative from Meriden (Democratic)
- Frederic C. Walcott, incumbent Senator since 1929 (Republican)

=== Results ===
1934 U.S. Senate election in Connecticut
Party	Candidate	Votes	%	±%
Democratic	Francis T. Maloney	265,552	51.75%	▲6.15
Republican	Frederic C. Walcott (incumbent)	247,623	48.25%	▼5.61
Total votes		513,175	100.00%	
Democratic gain from Republican				
