= 1900 Connecticut gubernatorial election =

- November 6, 1900
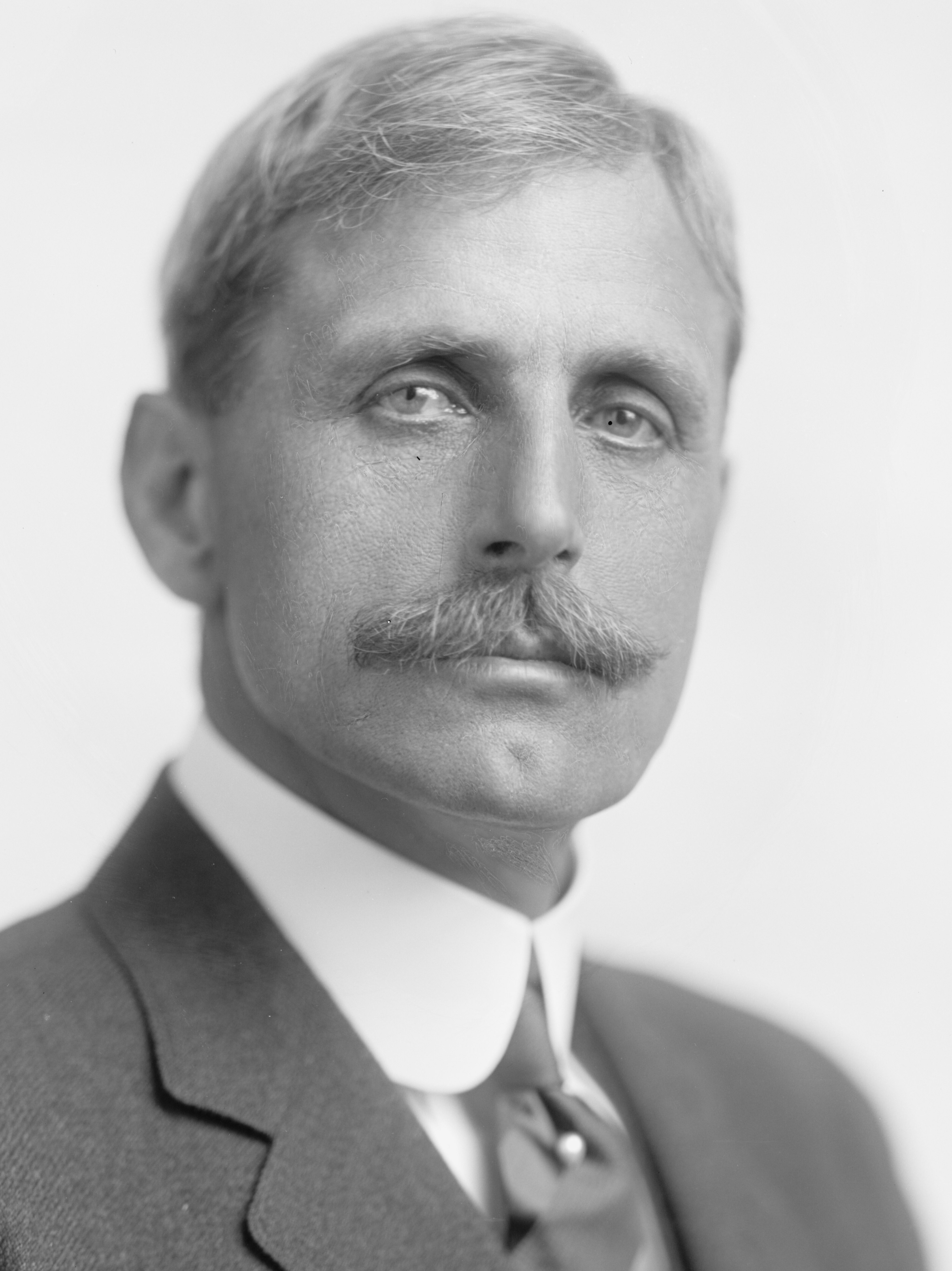

Nominee	George P. McLean	S. L. Bronson
Party	Republican	Democratic
Popular vote	95,822	81,421
Percentage	53.02%	45.05%
- McLean: 40–50% 50–60% 60–70% 70–80% 80–90% Bronson: 40–50% 50–60% 60–70%
Governor before election
George E. Lounsbury
Republican
Elected Governor
George P. McLean
Republican

The 1900 Connecticut gubernatorial election was held on November 6, 1900. Republican nominee George P. McLean defeated Democratic nominee S. L. Bronson with 53.02% of the vote.

== General election ==
=== Candidates ===
Major party candidates

- George P. McLean, Republican
- S. L. Bronson, Democratic

Other candidates

- Charles E. Steele, Prohibition
- George A. Sweetland, Social Democratic
- Adam Marx, Socialist Labor

=== Results ===
1900 Connecticut gubernatorial election
Party	Candidate	Votes	%	±%
Republican	George P. McLean	95,822	53.02%	
Democratic	S. L. Bronson	81,421	45.05%	
Prohibition	Charles E. Steele	1,548	0.86%	
Social Democratic	George A. Sweetland	1,056	0.58%	
Socialist Labor	Adam Marx	876	0.49%	
Majority		14,401		
Turnout				
Republican hold		Swing		
