= Weeks–McLean Act =

1913 US environmental law

- Other short titles: Migratory Bird Act of 1913
- Long title: An Act making appropriations for the Department of Agriculture for the fiscal year ending June thirtieth, nineteen hundred and fourteen
- Enacted by: the 62nd United States Congress
- Effective: March 4, 1913

Citations
- Public law: Public Law 62-430
- Statutes at Large: 37 Stat. 828

Legislative history
- Introduced in the Senate as S. 6497 by George P. McLean (R‑CT) on April 24, 1912; Committee consideration by Senate Committee on Agriculture and Forestry; Passed the Senate on January 22, 1913 (Voice vote); Passed the House of Representatives on March 3, 1913 (Voice vote); Signed into law by President William Howard Taft on March 4, 1913

The Weeks–McLean Act was a law of the United States sponsored by Representative John W. Weeks (R) of Massachusetts and Senator George P. McLean (R) of Connecticut that prohibited the spring hunting and marketing of migratory birds and the importation of wild bird feathers for women's fashion, ending what was called "millinery murder". It gave the Secretary of Agriculture the power to set hunting seasons nationwide, making it the first U.S. law ever passed to regulate the shooting of migratory birds. It became effective on 4 March 1913 but, because of a constitutional weakness, was later replaced by the Migratory Bird Treaty Act of 1918.

Henry Ford supported the legislation, "The only time I ever used the Ford organization to influence legislation was on behalf of the birds, and I think the end justified the means."

== See also ==
- Missouri v. Holland
- Lacey Act of 1900
