= The Political and Ecclesiastical Allegory of the First Book of the Faerie Queene =

The Political and Ecclesiastical Allegory of the First Book of the Faerie Queene is a book written by Frederick Morgan Padelford to explain the allegories within the poem The Faerie Queene by Edmund Spenser. The book was first published in 1911 in Boston by Ginn and Company as part of a series of University of Washington publications. The book has been republished since and is widely cited in papers and books related to the study of Spenser and his works.

The book has been reviewed by the Journal of English and Germanic Philology, The Sewanee Review, and The Dial, among others.
