= Boomerang (1947 film) =

1947 film by Elia Kazan

Boomerang!
- Theatrical release poster
- Directed by: Elia Kazan
- Screenplay by: Richard Murphy
- Based on: The Perfect Case; 1945 article in The Reader's Digest by Anthony Abbot
- Produced by: Louis de Rochemont; Darryl F. Zanuck
- Starring: Dana Andrews; Jane Wyatt; Lee J. Cobb
- Narrated by: Reed Hadley
- Cinematography: Norbert Brodine
- Edited by: Harmon Jones
- Music by: David Buttolph
- Color process: Black and white
- Production company: 20th Century Fox
- Distributed by: 20th Century Fox
- Release date: March 5, 1947
- Running time: 88 minutes
- Country: United States
- Language: English
- Budget: $1.14 million
- Box office: $2.25 million (rentals)

Boomerang! is a 1947 American crime semidocumentary film noir based on the true story of a vagrant accused of murder. It stars Dana Andrews, Lee J. Cobb, Karl Malden, Arthur Kennedy and Jane Wyatt, with voiceovers by Reed Hadley.

The film was directed by Elia Kazan and adapted from a 1945 Reader's Digest story written by Fulton Oursler (credited as Anthony Abbot) based on an actual 1924 crime. The film was shot mostly in Stamford, Connecticut, after Kazan was denied permission to film in Bridgeport, Connecticut, where the crime and trial occurred.

The film was entered into the 1947 Cannes Film Festival.

== Plot ==
Episcopal priest Father Lambert is shot dead on a Bridgeport, Connecticut street at night. The police, led by Chief Robinson, fail to immediately find the murderer. The case soon becomes a political hot potato, with the police accused of incompetence and the city's reform-minded administration attacked by the corrupt political machine that it had displaced. Robinson and prosecutor Henry Harvey face severe pressure by cheap political leaders, the press and the public to find the killer or otherwise seek outside help.

Strenuous local efforts yield nothing. However, vagrant military veteran John Waldron is arrested in Ohio and meets the general description of the murder suspect. He is extradited to Connecticut and identified in a lineup. Waldron is interrogated for two days by the corrupt police until, suffering from severe sleep deprivation, he confesses. A gun that was in his possession is believed to be that which was used in the shooting, and witness testimony and other circumstantial evidence seem solid enough to guarantee conviction.

Harvey questions Waldron and investigates the evidence and the witnesses. He develops serious doubts about Waldron's guilt. In court, Harvey states that a prosecutor must seek justice, not merely attempt to convict. He presents the flaws in the case before the judge and indicates that he intends to dismiss the charges. Suspecting that Harvey's plea is driven by political motives, the judge warns him that he will hold his actions to the highest scrutiny. Chief Robinson thwarts a lynch mob trying to seize Waldron outside of the court building.

Harvey is threatened by reform party kingpin and real estate swindler Paul Harris, who seeks to blackmail him based on Harvey's wife's innocent contribution to a community fund for park land that Harris secretly owns. Harvey threatens to physically remove Harris from his home.

At a preliminary hearing, Harvey presents detailed evidence that would lead to Waldron's exoneration. Meanwhile, a reporter conducts his own investigation into possible wrongdoing. In court, the reporter secretly threatens to reveal Harris' double dealing, and Harris commits suicide in the courtroom.

Waldron is exonerated and the narrator explains that the murder was never solved and that the character of Henry Harvey was based upon Homer Cummings, who rose from state prosecutor to become the United States attorney general.

== Cast ==
- Dana Andrews as State's Attorney Henry L. Harvey
- Jane Wyatt as Madge Harvey
- Lee J. Cobb as Chief Harold F. "Robby" Robinson
- Cara Williams as Irene Nelson (waitress at Coney Island Cafe)
- Arthur Kennedy as John Waldron (murder suspect)
- Sam Levene as Dave Woods (reporter, Morning Record)
- Taylor Holmes as T. M. Wade (Morning Record publisher)
- Robert Keith as "Mac" McCreery
- Ed Begley as Paul Harris
- Karl Malden as Det. Lt. White
- William Challee as Stone, Harvey's assistant
- Lewis Leverett as Whitney, Harvey's assistant
- Dimples Cooper (Elizabeth Cooper) as Church choir member (uncredited)

== Background ==
=== Factual basis ===
The film is based on an actual 1924 murder case that occurred in Bridgeport, Connecticut. While walking near the Lyric Theatre in downtown Bridgeport, the Rev. Hubert Dahme (Father George Lambert in the film) was fatally shot behind the left ear by a gun fired at close range. Those in the theater were so shocked that none thought to call for an ambulance until ten minutes had passed. Two hours later, the priest was pronounced dead at St. Vincent's Hospital in Bridgeport. Harold Israel, a vagrant and discharged soldier, was indicted for the murder. Israel confessed to the crime, and a .32 revolver was found in his possession that police believed had been used in the murder. Fairfield County state's attorney Homer Cummings conducted a thorough investigation and cleared Israel of the crime. Cummings (Henry Harvey in the film) later became United States attorney general under Franklin D. Roosevelt. The Morning Record was the name used in the film for the Bridgeport Post (now the Connecticut Post).

=== Filming locations ===
Almost all of the film was shot in Stamford, Connecticut except for the courtroom scene shot in the Westchester County Superior Court in White Plains, New York.

Stamford locations:

- The South End of Stamford, particularly at Saint Luke's Chapel.
- Old Town Hall, particularly the police-department offices and the stairway leading to the courtroom.
- The Altschul home on Den Road (for a meeting of leading citizens).
- The front and sidewalk of the Plaza Theatre, which stood on Greyrock Place (where a driveway leading into the Stamford Town Center mall now stands).
- The former offices of The Advocate, the Stamford daily newspaper, on Atlantic Street. Some members of the Advocate's editorial staff were used in the scene in which news breaks that the killer has been caught.

The film premiered at the Palace Theatre in Stamford on March 5, 1947, with Kazan and Andrews in attendance. Kazan later directed the 1947 Oscar-winning Gentleman's Agreement, also starring Jane Wyatt, which takes place in nearby Darien, Connecticut and was partly filmed in the area.

=== Legal ===
In the film, the police interrogation of John Waldron continues after Waldron exercises his right to counsel by requesting a lawyer. This practice would later be ruled unconstitutional by the Supreme Court in the 1981 landmark case of Edwards v. Arizona.

== Reception ==
=== Critical response ===
In a contemporary review for The New York Times, critic Bosley Crowther discussed the filmmaking, writing that the "style of presentation has resulted in a drama of rare clarity and punch".

Variety published a positive review, writing: "Boomerang! is gripping, real-life melodrama, told in semi-documentary style. Lensing was done on location at Stamford, Conn, the locale adding to realism. Based on a still unsolved murder case in Bridgeport, Conn, plot is backed up with strong cast ... All the leads have the stamp of authenticities. The dialog and situations further the factual technique. Lee J. Cobb shows up strongly as chief detective, harassed by press and politicians alike while trying to carry out his duties. Arthur Kennedy is great as the law's suspect." In The Nation in 1947, critic James Agee wrote, "Boomerang! never tries to get beyond the very good best that good journalistic artists can do, but on that level it is a triumph ... "

=== Awards and honors ===
Wins

- National Board of Review: NBR Award, Best Director, Elia Kazan; 1947.
- New York Film Critics Circle Awards: NYFCC Award Best Director, Elia Kazan; 1947.

Nominations

- Academy Awards: Oscar, Best Writing, Screenplay, Richard Murphy; 1947.

The film is recognized by American Film Institute in these lists:

- 2001: AFI's 100 Years...100 Thrills – Nominated

== Adaptations ==
Boomerang! was dramatized as a half-hour radio play on the November 10, 1947 broadcast of The Screen Guild Theater with Dana Andrews and Jane Wyatt, on the January 14, 1949 broadcast of the Ford Theatre with Andrews and on Hollywood Sound Stage with Tyrone Power and Wyatt on February 28, 1952.

== See also ==
- Harold Israel
- Homer Stille Cummings
