= Francis T. Maloney =

American politician (1894–1945)

Francis Maloney
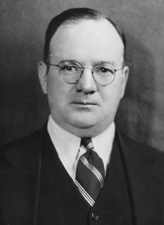

Chair of the Senate Public Buildings Committee
- In office 1942–1945
- Preceded by: Tom Connally
- Succeeded by: Charles O. Andrews

Secretary of the Senate Democratic Caucus
- In office January 3, 1943 – January 3, 1945
- Leader: Alben W. Barkley
- Preceded by: Joshua B. Lee
- Succeeded by: Brien McMahon

United States Senator from Connecticut
- In office January 3, 1935 – January 16, 1945
- Preceded by: Frederic C. Walcott
- Succeeded by: Thomas C. Hart

Member of the U.S. House of Representatives from Connecticut's 3rd district
- In office March 4, 1933 – January 3, 1935
- Preceded by: John Q. Tilson
- Succeeded by: James A. Shanley

Mayor of Meriden
- In office 1929–1933

Personal details
- Born: Francis Thomas Maloney; March 31, 1894 Meriden, Connecticut, U.S.
- Died: January 16, 1945 (aged 50) Meriden, Connecticut, U.S.
- Party: Democratic
- Spouse: Martha N. Herzig (m. 1918)

Francis Thomas Maloney (March 31, 1894 – January 16, 1945) was a U.S. representative from Connecticut from 1933 to 1935 and a U.S. senator from Connecticut from 1935 to 1945. He was a Democrat.

== Early life ==
Maloney was born in Meriden, Connecticut, on March 31, 1894. He was a Catholic and his father and maternal grandparents were from Ireland. He attended public and parochial schools of Meriden. From 1914 to 1921, he worked as a newspaper reporter, except for 1917–1918, when he served as a seaman first class in the US Navy during the First World War. He then engaged in real estate and insurance business.

== Political career ==
Maloney served as mayor of Meriden from 1929 to 1933. He was elected as a Democrat to the U.S. House of Representatives of the seventy-third Congress and served from March 4, 1933, to January 3, 1935, in the session that was shorter than the usual two years because the time when the sessions would open was changed. He did not seek reelection, because he had been nominated for the Senate. He was elected to the Senate in 1934, re-elected in 1940 and served until his death in 1945. He was chairman of the Committee on Public Buildings and Grounds in the seventy-seventh through seventy-ninth Congresses.

Maloney was a delegate to the Democratic National Convention from Connecticut in 1936, 1940, and 1944.

Maloney was admitted to the Meriden Hospital on January 1, 1945, with what was thought to be a bad cold and developed into influenza. He suffered a heart attack at the hospital on January 10, and he was determined to be suffering from coronary thrombosis. He suffered a second heart attack at the hospital at 10:45 a.m. on January 16, and died within seconds. He was interred in Sacred Heart Cemetery.

== Legacy ==
One of the two public high schools in Meriden, Connecticut, is named for Maloney.

== See also ==
- List of members of the United States Congress who died in office (1900–1949)

U.S. House of Representatives
Preceded by John Q. Tilson	Member of the U.S. House of Representatives from Connecticut's 3rd congressional district 1933–1935	Succeeded by James A. Shanley
Party political offices
Preceded by Augustine Lonergan	Democratic nominee for U.S. Senator from Connecticut (Class 1); 1934, 1940	Succeeded by Wilbur Lucius Cross
Preceded by Joshua B. Lee	Secretary of the Senate Democratic Caucus; 1943–1945	Succeeded by Brien McMahon
U.S. Senate
Preceded by Frederic C. Walcott	U.S. Senator (Class 1) from Connecticut; 1935–1945; Served alongside: Augustine Lonergan, John Danaher, Brien McMahon	Succeeded by Thomas C. Hart
Preceded by Tom Connally	Chair of the Senate Public Buildings Committee; 1942–1945	Succeeded by Charles O. Andrews
