= Frederic C. Walcott =

American politician (1869–1949)

Frederic Collin Walcott
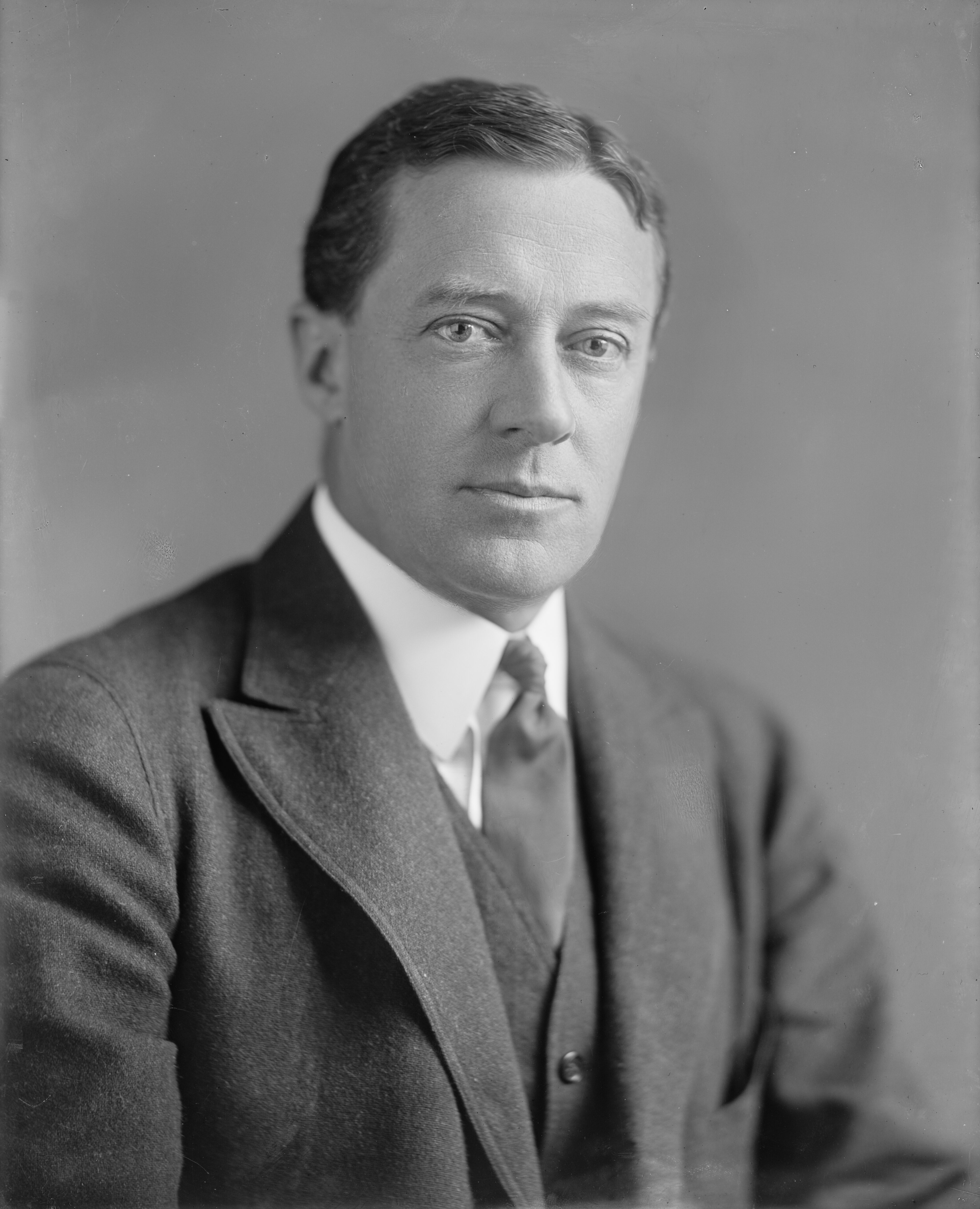
- Walcott in 1905

United States Senator from Connecticut
- In office March 4, 1929 – January 3, 1935
- Preceded by: George P. McLean
- Succeeded by: Francis T. Maloney

Member of the Connecticut Senate
- In office 1925-1929

Personal details
- Born: February 19, 1869 New York Mills, New York, US
- Died: April 27, 1949 (aged 80) Stamford, Connecticut, US
- Party: Republican
- Spouse(s): Frances Dana Archbold, Mary Hussey Guthrie

Frederic Collin Walcott (February 19, 1869 – April 27, 1949) was a United States senator from Connecticut.

== Biography ==
Born in New York Mills, Oneida County, New York, the son of William Stuart Walcott and Emeline Alice Welch Walcott, Walcott attended the public schools of Utica, New York and graduated from Lawrenceville School (Lawrenceville, New Jersey) in 1886, from Phillips Academy (Andover, Massachusetts) in 1887, and from Yale University in 1891, where he was a member of Skull and Bones. He married Frances Dana Archbold February 14, 1899, and she died the same year. He married Mary Hussey Guthrie on April 3, 1907, in Pittsburgh, Allegheny County, Pennsylvania.

He was the nephew of William H. Welch.

== Career ==
Walcott moved to New York City in 1907 and engaged in the manufacture of cotton cloth and banking. When Walcott moved to Norfolk, Connecticut, in 1910, he continued his business connections in New York City until 1921, when he retired from active business pursuits.

During the First World War, Walcott served with the United States Food Administration as assistant to Herbert Hoover; he was decorated by the government of France with the Legion of Honor and by Poland with the Officer's Cross. He was president of the Connecticut Board of Fisheries and Game from 1923 to 1928 and chairman of the Connecticut Water Commission from 1925 to 1928. He was a delegate to Republican National Convention from Connecticut in 1924, 1928, and 1932.

Walcott was a member of the state senate from 1925 to 1929, serving as president pro tempore from 1927 to 1929. He was elected as a Republican to the U.S. Senate and served from March 4, 1929, to January 3, 1935, and was an unsuccessful candidate for re-election in 1934.

From 1935 to 1939, Walcott was commissioner of welfare of Connecticut, and a member of the advisory committee of the Human Welfare Group of Yale University from 1920 to 1948, and of Bethume Cookman College, Daytona, Florida, from 1922 to 1948. He also served as regent of the Smithsonian Institution from 1941 to 1948.

== Death ==
Walcott died in Stamford, Connecticut on April 27, 1949, (age 80 years, 67 days). He is interred at New Milford Center Cemetery in New Milford.

Party political offices
Preceded by George P. McLean	Republican nominee for U.S. Senator from Connecticut (Class 1); 1928, 1934	Succeeded by Paul L. Cornell
U.S. Senate
Preceded by George P. McLean	U.S. senator (Class 1) from Connecticut; 1929-1935	Succeeded by Francis T. Maloney
