= George P. McLean =

American politician (1857–1932)

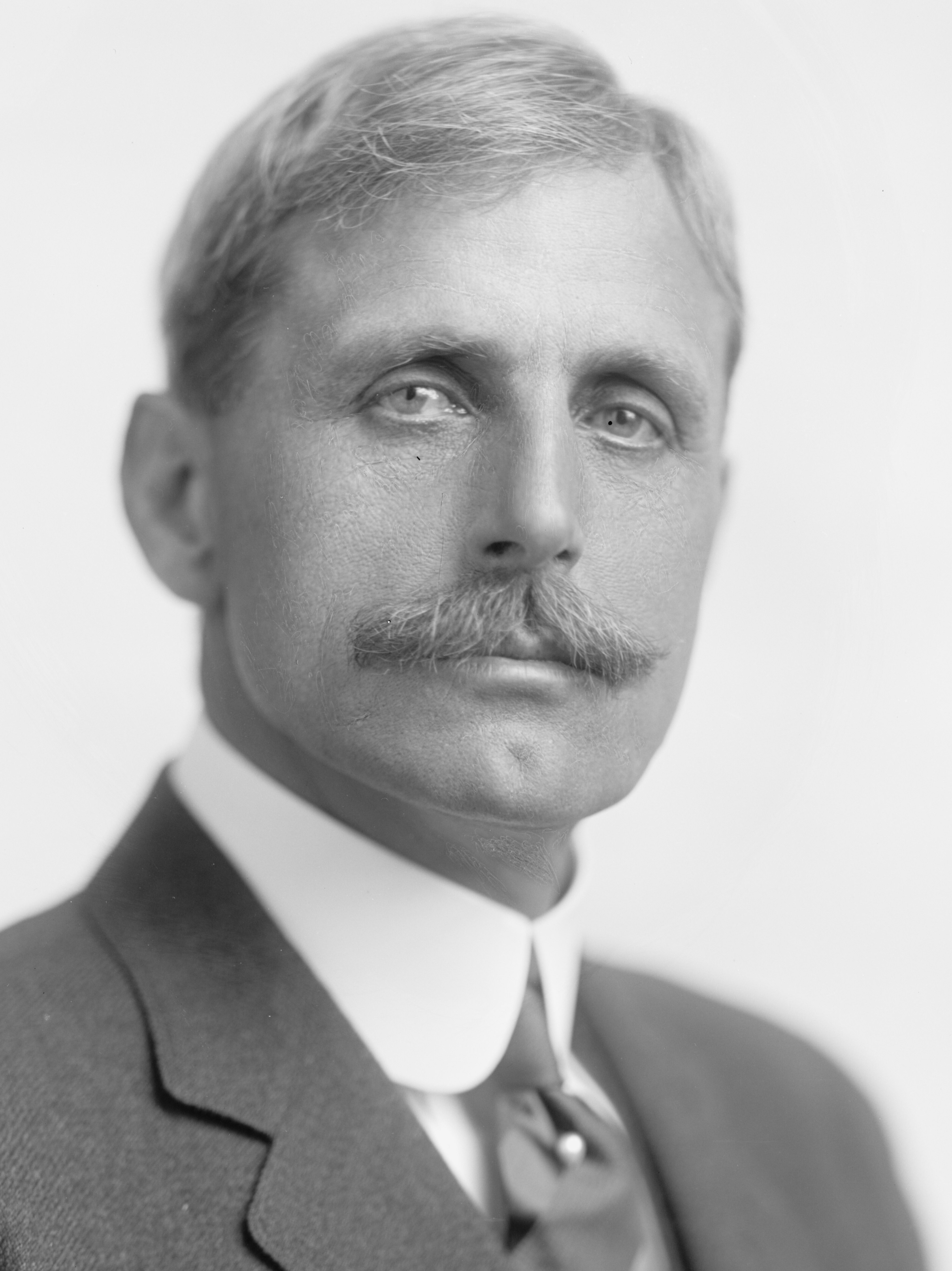
- McLean, 1905–1932

United States Senator from Connecticut
- In office March 4, 1911 – March 3, 1929
- Preceded by: Morgan G. Bulkeley
- Succeeded by: Frederic C. Walcott

59th Governor of Connecticut
- In office January 9, 1901 – January 7, 1903
- Lieutenant: Edwin O. Keeler
- Preceded by: George E. Lounsbury
- Succeeded by: Abiram Chamberlain

United States Attorney for the District of Connecticut
- In office 1892–1896
- President: Benjamin Harrison; Grover Cleveland
- Preceded by: George G. Sill
- Succeeded by: Charles W. Comstock

Member of the Connecticut Senate from the 3rd district
- In office 1886–1888

Member of the Connecticut House of Representatives from Simsbury
- In office 1883–1884

Personal details
- Born: George Payne McLean; October 7, 1857 Simsbury, Connecticut, U.S.
- Died: June 6, 1932 (aged 74) Simsbury, Connecticut, U.S.
- Party: Republican
- Spouse: Juliette Goodrich (m. 1907)

George Payne McLean (October 7, 1857 – June 6, 1932) was the 59th governor of Connecticut, and a United States senator from Connecticut.

== Biography ==
McLean was born in Simsbury, Connecticut, one of five children of Dudley B. McLean and Mary (Payne) McLean. His sister Sarah Pratt McLean Greene became a novelist. McLean attended the common schools in Simsbury. At the age of fifteen he entered Hartford High School, traveling to school each day on the train. He graduated in 1876. Upon graduation he took a job as a reporter for the Hartford Evening Post. Leaving the paper in 1879, he entered the Hartford law office of Henry C. Robinson and trained as a lawyer in that office. He remained there eight years, combining his apprenticeship with Robinson with a part-time job in financial management at Trinity College in Hartford. During this time he passed the law exam and was admitted to the bar.

A confirmed bachelor until he was forty-nine, he married his longtime Simsbury sweetheart Juliette Goodrich on April 10, 1907. She was forty-two. They had no children. He died on June 6, 1932, and she on October 21, 1950. They are buried in Simsbury Cemetery.

== Career ==
McLean was a member of the Connecticut House of Representatives in 1883 and 1884, He served as clerk of the State Board of Pardons from 1884 to 1901; and a member of the commission to revise the Connecticut statutes, 1885. He was a member of the state senate in 1886. He was a member of the Connecticut State Senate from 1889 to 1891. In 1890, he was elected Connecticut's Secretary of State, but never took office because of the deadlocked Legislature of 1891-1893. As a result, McLean was able to accept President Benjamin Harrison's appointment in 1892 to be United States attorney for his home state from 1892 to 1896. He resumed the practice of law in Hartford

Elected the 59th governor of Connecticut in 1901 and 1902, McLean served beginning on January 9, 1901. During his tenure, the governor's administrative staff was restructured, as well the state militia; and a tax commission office was founded. McLean did not seek reelection due to ill health, and left the governor's office on January 7, 1903.

McLean was elected as a Republican to the U.S. Senate in 1910 and served from 1911 to 1929. He was reelected in 1916 and 1922.

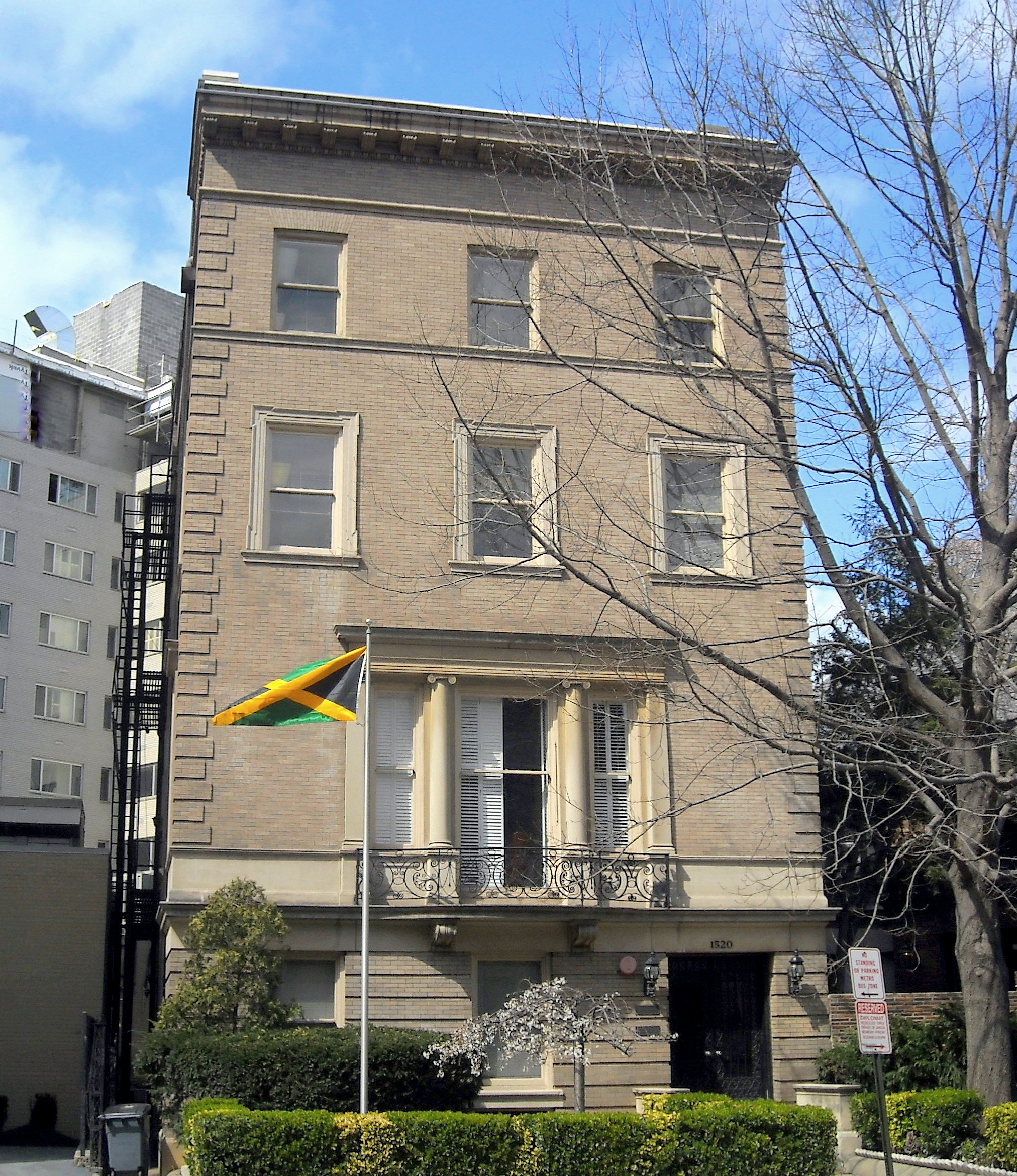
Former residence of George P. McLean in Washington, D.C.

While in the Senate, he was chairman of the Committee on Forest Reservations and Game Protection (Sixty-second and Sixty-fifth Congresses) and a member of the Committee on Banking and Currency (Sixty-sixth through Sixty-ninth Congresses) and the Committee on Manufactures (Seventieth Congress). He declined to run for reelection in 1928.

== Migratory Bird Treaty Act ==
Probably McLean's most lasting legislative achievement was the Migratory Bird Treaty Act of 1918. Concern had been growing nationally about the mass killing of birds for hat-making uses and for food; with support from gun manufacturers and hunting organizations, McLean and Rep. John W. Weeks of Massachusetts successfully attached the Weeks-McLean Act to an appropriations bill in March 1913. Some of the provisions in the act proved controversial in their expansion of federal powers and were declared unconstitutional by various courts. With the advice of Elihu Root, McLean immediately introduced new legislation giving the president the power to negotiate a treaty to regulate the hunting of migratory birds; this bill was passed in July 1913. The Migratory Bird Treaty with Great Britain (acting for Canada) was signed in 1916, and the Migratory Bird Treaty Act to ratify and implement the treaty was passed in 1918. The resulting federal limitations on hunting were upheld by the Supreme Court in 1920 in the Missouri v. Holland decision.

== Death and legacy ==
McLean resumed the practice of law in Hartford, and died of heart disease in Simsbury, on June 6, 1932 (age 74 years, 243 days). He is interred at Simsbury Cemetery.

His will established the non-profit McLean Fund, which has since operated two enterprises in his home town of Simsbury - a senior living community and elder-care services provider and a private game refuge. The McLean Game Refuge consists of over 4,200 acres (17 km^{2}) of land in Simsbury and Granby and is open to the public; part of it has been designated a National Natural Landmark. The McLean senior living organization consists of an independent living community and a multi-faceted elder-care service provider that offers services ranging from visiting nurses and adult day care to assisted living, long-term care, hospice, post surgical acute, inpatient physical rehabilitation and outpatient physical rehabilitation.

Party political offices
Preceded by George E. Lounsbury	Republican nominee for Governor of Connecticut; 1900	Succeeded by Abiram Chamberlain
First	Republican nominee for U.S. Senator from Connecticut (Class 1); 1916, 1922	Succeeded by Frederic C. Walcott
Political offices
Preceded by George E. Lounsbury	Governor of Connecticut; 1901–1903	Succeeded by Abiram Chamberlain
U.S. Senate
Preceded by Morgan G. Bulkeley	U.S. senator (Class 1) from Connecticut; 1911–1929	Succeeded by Frederic C. Walcott
