= Harry Morgan Ayres =

American scholar (1881–1948)

Ayres painted by Richard M. Brown in 1948

Harry Morgan Ayres (October 6, 1881 – November 20, 1948) was a professor of English Literature at Columbia University an author, and editor. He edited The Reader's Dictionary of Authors including entries for Charles William Eliot, Wilfrid Wilson Gibson, and George Moore and also contributed to the Library of the World's Best Literature.

The English Journal Volume 13 described The Modern students book of English literature he compiled and wrote with Frederick Morgan Padelford and William David Howe as: "A brave effort to give something of every trope - even letters and a taste of modern critical and biographical prose." The description adds that the selection of early English material is "more adequate" than is usual.

He defended General Dwight Eisenhower's appointment at Columbia pointing to the scholarly quality of his Guidhall speech in London.

He wrote an essay on Modern American Tendencies for The Cambridge History of English and American Literature in 18 Volumes.

== Bibliography ==
- The Reader's Dictionary of Authors (editor)
  - On Charles William Eliot entry
  - On Wilfrid Wilson Gibson entry
  - On George Moore entry
- The English Language in America, author
- America and the English Tradition, author
- Modern Essays, one of the author contributors writing the essay America and the English Tradition.
- The modern student's book of English literature by Harry Morgan Ayres and others published in 1924 by Scribners' sons
- Beowulf, a paraphrase by Harry Morgan Ayres, published in 1933
- Library of the World's Best Literature, contributing author
- A Tale of Palmyra Isle
- Dante Alighieri: La Divina Commedia. Inferno (1949); Purgatorio (1953); Paradiso (1953). S. F. Vanni, New York, 3 vols (These are volumes in the series ‘Casa Italiana Library of Italian Classics’, sponsored by Columbia University.), translator
