= Frederick Morgan Padelford =

American professor and author

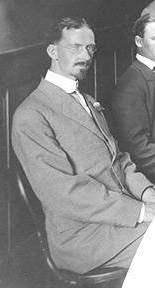
Padelford, 1909

Frederick Morgan Padelford (1875–1942), pronounced Pa-DEL-ford, was an American professor and author. He worked at the University of Washington in Seattle for 41 years. He chaired the English Department and served as dean of the graduate school. The Orbis Cascade Alliance has a collection of his papers.

Padelford graduated with a B.A. from Colby College (1896) and a PhD from Yale (1899). He also received an LLD from Mills College in 1936.

He was a Spenserian scholar. A review of one of his works described him as writing with great spirit and mastery of evidence.

He married Jessie Elizabeth (Bessie) Pepper (1874–1967). Her father was President of Colby College. Their children were Morgan, Charlie, Eunice, and Philip Sidney Padelford (June 8, 1912 – October 12, 2009).

Padelford Hall, a building on the University of Washington Seattle campus, is named in his honor.

== Bibliography ==
- The Political and Ecclesiastical Allegory of the First Book of the Faerie Queene (1911) published by Ginn and Company in Boston
- Early sixteenth century lyrics
- Old English musical terms
- Select translations from Scaliger's Poetics by Frederick Morgan Padelford.
- Samuel Osborne, janitor, about "Janitor Sam" Osborne, an African American whose history and treatment at Colby College is controversial and for whom the president's house at Colby is now named.
- The comedy of errors, by William Shakespeare, ed. by Frederick Morgan Padelford, New York, Macmillan, 1912
- "Poems of Henry Howard", article
- Spenser Allusions : In the Sixteenth and Seventeenth Centuries, compiled by Frederick Morgan Padelford, edited by William Wells
- George Dana Boardman Pepper: a Biographical Sketch by Frederick Morgan Padelford, published by L. Phillips, 1914
- Essays on the Study and Use of Poetry by Plutarch and Basil the Great, Volume 15 by Frederick Morgan Padelford, published by H. Holt, 1902
- The Songs of Rawlinson Ms. C813, Issue 1 by Frederick Morgan Padelford and Allen Rogers Benham, 1909
- The Axiochus of Plato by Plato, translated by Edmund Spenser, edited by Frederick Morgan Padelford
- "The Gothic Spirit in Shakespeare." South Atlantic Quarterly 1 July 1916; 15 (3): 223–240.
