= List of elections in 1940 =

The following elections occurred in the year 1940.

== Africa ==
- 1940 South-West African legislative election

== Asia ==
- 1940 Afghan parliamentary election
- 1940 Philippine special election

== Europe ==
- 1940 Estonian parliamentary election
- 1940 Faroese general election
- 1940 Finnish presidential election
- 1940 Latvian parliamentary election
- 1940 Lithuanian parliamentary election
- 1940 Moldavian parliamentary election
- 1940 Swedish general election

=== United Kingdom ===
- 1940 Battersea North by-election
- 1940 Birmingham Edgbaston by-election
- 1940 Bow and Bromley by-election
- 1940 City of London by-election
- 1940 Croydon North by-election
- 1940 Kettering by-election
- 1940 Leeds North East by-election
- 1940 Middlesbrough West by-election
- 1940 Middleton and Prestwich by-election
- 1940 Newcastle upon Tyne North by-election
- 1940 Nottingham Central by-election
- 1940 Preston by-election
- 1940 East Renfrewshire by-election
- 1940 Rochdale by-election
- 1940 Spen Valley by-election
- 1940 Swansea East by-election
- 1940 Wansbeck by-election

== North America ==
- 1940 Costa Rican general election
- 1940 Mexican general election
- 1940 Panamanian general election

=== Canada ===
- 1940 Canadian federal election
- 1940 Alberta general election
- 1940 Edmonton municipal election
- 1940 Ottawa municipal election
- 1940 Toronto municipal election
- 1940 Yukon general election

=== Caribbean ===
- 1940 Cuban general election

=== United States ===
- 1940 New York state election
- 1940 United States elections
- 1940 United States presidential election

==== United States lieutenant gubernatorial ====
- 1940 Connecticut lieutenant gubernatorial election
- 1940 Delaware lieutenant gubernatorial election
- 1940 Illinois lieutenant gubernatorial election
- 1940 Louisiana lieutenant gubernatorial election
- 1940 Minnesota lieutenant gubernatorial election
- 1940 Missouri lieutenant gubernatorial election
- 1940 Nebraska lieutenant gubernatorial election
- 1940 North Carolina lieutenant gubernatorial election
- 1940 Texas lieutenant gubernatorial election
- 1940 Wisconsin lieutenant gubernatorial election

==== United States gubernatorial ====
- 1940 Arizona gubernatorial election
- 1940 Arkansas gubernatorial election
- 1940 Colorado gubernatorial election
- 1940 Connecticut gubernatorial election
- 1940 Delaware gubernatorial election
- 1940 Florida gubernatorial election
- 1940 Georgia gubernatorial election
- 1940 Idaho gubernatorial election
- 1940 Illinois gubernatorial election
- 1940 Indiana gubernatorial election
- 1940 Iowa gubernatorial election
- 1940 Kansas gubernatorial election
- 1940 Louisiana gubernatorial election
- 1940 Maine gubernatorial election
- 1940 Massachusetts gubernatorial election
- 1940 Michigan gubernatorial election
- 1940 Minnesota gubernatorial election
- 1940 Missouri gubernatorial election
- 1940 Montana gubernatorial election
- 1940 Nebraska gubernatorial election
- 1940 New Hampshire gubernatorial election
- 1940 New Jersey gubernatorial election
- 1940 New Mexico gubernatorial election
- 1940 North Carolina gubernatorial election
- 1940 North Dakota gubernatorial election
- 1940 Ohio gubernatorial election
- 1940 Rhode Island gubernatorial election
- 1940 South Dakota gubernatorial election
- 1940 Tennessee gubernatorial election
- 1940 Texas gubernatorial election
- 1940 United States gubernatorial elections
- 1940 Utah gubernatorial election
- 1940 Vermont gubernatorial election
- 1940 Washington gubernatorial election
- 1940 West Virginia gubernatorial election
- 1940 Wisconsin gubernatorial election

==== United States House of Representatives ====
- 1940 United States House of Representatives elections
- 1940 United States House of Representatives elections in California
- 1940 United States House of Representatives elections in South Carolina

==== United States Senate ====
- 1940 United States Senate elections
- 1940 United States Senate election in Arizona
- 1940 United States Senate election in California
- 1940 United States Senate election in Connecticut
- 1940 United States Senate election in Delaware
- 1940 United States Senate election in Florida
- 1940 United States Senate special election in Idaho
- 1940 United States Senate special election in Illinois
- 1940 United States Senate election in Indiana
- 1940 United States Senate special election in Kentucky
- 1940 United States Senate election in Maine
- 1940 United States Senate election in Maryland
- 1940 United States Senate election in Massachusetts
- 1940 United States Senate election in Michigan
- 1940 United States Senate election in Minnesota
- 1940 United States Senate election in Mississippi
- 1940 United States Senate election in Missouri
- 1940 United States Senate election in Montana
- 1940 United States Senate election in Nebraska
- 1940 United States Senate election in New Jersey
- 1940 United States Senate election in New York
- 1940 United States Senate election in North Dakota
- 1940 United States Senate election in Ohio
- 1940 United States Senate election in Pennsylvania
- 1940 United States Senate election in Tennessee
- 1940 United States Senate election in Texas
- 1940 United States Senate election in Vermont
- 1940 United States Senate special election in Vermont
- 1940 United States Senate election in Virginia
- 1940 United States Senate election in Washington
- 1940 United States Senate election in Wisconsin
- 1940 United States Senate election in Wyoming

=== United States mayoral elections ===
- 1940 Auburn, Alabama municipal elections

== South America ==
- 1940 Bolivian general election
- 1940 Ecuadorian presidential election
- 1940 Argentine legislative election
- 1940 Paraguayan constitutional referendum

== Oceania ==
=== Australia ===
- 1940 Australian federal election
- 1940 Barwon state by-election
- 1940 Corio by-election
- 1940 Croydon state by-election
- 1940 Kalgoorlie by-election
- 1940 Ryde state by-election
- 1940 Swan by-election
- 1940 Tamworth state by-election
- 1940 Victorian state election

== See also ==
- Category:1940 elections
