= List of elections in 1944 =

The following elections occurred in the year 1944.

== Asia ==
- 1943–1944 Iranian legislative election

== Europe ==
- 1944 Hungarian parliamentary election
- 1944 Icelandic constitutional referendum
- 1944 Icelandic presidential election
- 1944 Irish general election
- 1944 Swedish general election

=== United Kingdom ===
- 1944 Berwick-upon-Tweed by-election
- 1944 Bilston by-election
- 1944 Brighton by-election
- 1944 Bury St Edmunds by-election
- 1944 Camberwell North by-election
- 1944 Chelsea by-election
- 1944 Clay Cross by-election
- 1944 Kirkcaldy Burghs by-election
- 1944 Manchester Rusholme by-election
- 1944 Sheffield Attercliffe by-election
- 1944 Skipton by-election
- 1944 West Derbyshire by-election

== North America ==
=== Canada ===
- 1944 Alberta general election
- 1944 Edmonton municipal election
- 1944 New Brunswick general election
- 1944 Ottawa municipal election
- 1944 Quebec general election
- 1944 Saskatchewan general election
- 1944 Toronto municipal election
- 1944 Yukon general election

=== Caribbean ===
- 1944 Cuban general election

=== United States ===
- 1944 United States elections
- 1944 United States presidential election

==== United States lieutenant gubernatorial ====
- 1944 Connecticut lieutenant gubernatorial election
- 1944 Delaware lieutenant gubernatorial election
- 1944 Illinois lieutenant gubernatorial election
- 1944 Louisiana lieutenant gubernatorial election
- 1944 Minnesota lieutenant gubernatorial election
- 1944 Missouri lieutenant gubernatorial election
- 1944 Nebraska lieutenant gubernatorial election
- 1944 North Carolina lieutenant gubernatorial election
- 1944 Texas lieutenant gubernatorial election
- 1944 Wisconsin lieutenant gubernatorial election

==== United States gubernatorial ====
- 1944 Arizona gubernatorial election
- 1944 Arkansas gubernatorial election
- 1944 Colorado gubernatorial election
- 1944 Connecticut gubernatorial election
- 1944 Delaware gubernatorial election
- 1944 Florida gubernatorial election
- 1944 Idaho gubernatorial election
- 1944 Illinois gubernatorial election
- 1944 Indiana gubernatorial election
- 1944 Iowa gubernatorial election
- 1944 Kansas gubernatorial election
- 1944 Louisiana gubernatorial election
- 1944 Maine gubernatorial election
- 1944 Massachusetts gubernatorial election
- 1944 Michigan gubernatorial election
- 1944 Minnesota gubernatorial election
- 1944 Missouri gubernatorial election
- 1944 Montana gubernatorial election
- 1944 Nebraska gubernatorial election
- 1944 New Hampshire gubernatorial election
- 1944 New Mexico gubernatorial election
- 1944 North Carolina gubernatorial election
- 1944 North Dakota gubernatorial election
- 1944 Ohio gubernatorial election
- 1944 Rhode Island gubernatorial election
- 1944 South Dakota gubernatorial election
- 1944 Tennessee gubernatorial election
- 1944 Texas gubernatorial election
- 1944 United States gubernatorial elections
- 1944 Utah gubernatorial election
- 1944 Vermont gubernatorial election
- 1944 Washington gubernatorial election
- 1944 West Virginia gubernatorial election
- 1944 Wisconsin gubernatorial election

==== United States House of Representatives ====
- 1944 United States House of Representatives elections

==== United States Senate ====
- 1944 United States Senate elections
- 1944 United States Senate election in Alabama
- 1944 United States Senate election in Arizona
- 1944 United States Senate election in Arkansas
- 1944 United States Senate election in California
- 1944 United States Senate election in Colorado
- 1944 United States Senate election in Connecticut
- 1944 United States Senate election in Florida
- 1944 United States Senate election in Idaho
- 1944 United States Senate election in Illinois
- 1944 United States Senate elections in Indiana
- 1944 United States Senate election in Iowa
- 1944 United States Senate election in Kansas
- 1944 United States Senate election in Kentucky
- 1944 United States Senate election in Louisiana
- 1944 United States Senate election in Maryland
- 1944 United States Senate special election in Massachusetts
- 1944 United States Senate election in Missouri
- 1944 United States Senate election in Nevada
- 1944 United States Senate election in New Hampshire
- 1944 United States Senate special election in New Jersey
- 1944 United States Senate election in New York
- 1944 United States Senate election in North Carolina
- 1944 United States Senate election in North Dakota
- 1944 United States Senate election in Ohio
- 1944 United States Senate election in Oklahoma
- 1944 United States Senate election in Oregon
- 1944 United States Senate special election in Oregon
- 1944 United States Senate election in Pennsylvania
- 1944 United States Senate election in South Carolina
- 1944 United States Senate election in South Dakota
- 1944 United States Senate election in Vermont
- 1944 United States Senate election in Washington
- 1944 United States Senate election in Wisconsin

=== United States mayoral elections ===
- 1944 Auburn, Alabama municipal elections

== South America ==
=== El Salvador ===
- 1944 Salvadoran Constitutional Assembly election
- 1944 Salvadoran presidential election

=== Guatemala ===
- 1944 Guatemalan Constitutional Assembly election
- 1944 Guatemalan presidential election
- November 1944 Guatemalan parliamentary election
- October 1944 Guatemalan parliamentary election
- July 1944 Guatemalan presidential election

== Oceania ==
=== Australia ===
- 1944 Lowan state by-election
- 1944 New South Wales state election
- 1944 Queensland state election
- 1944 Swan state by-election
- 1944 Australian referendum
- 1944 South Australian state election

== See also ==
- Category:1944 elections
