= Bill Dodd (Louisiana politician) =

American politician (1909–1991)

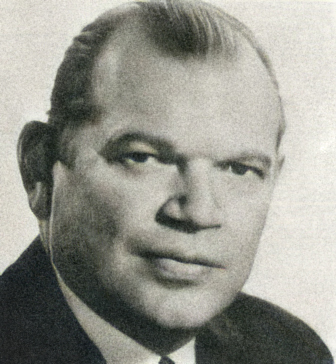

Louisiana State Representative from Allen Parish
- In office 1940–1948
- Preceded by: David Cole
- Succeeded by: M.V. Hargrove

42nd Lieutenant Governor of Louisiana
- In office May 11, 1948 – May 13, 1952
- Governor: Earl K. Long
- Preceded by: J. Emile Verret
- Succeeded by: C. E. Barham

Louisiana State Auditor (later Comptroller; office is no longer elected.)
- In office 1956–1960
- Preceded by: Allison Kolb
- Succeeded by: Roy R. Theriot

Louisiana State Board of Education
- In office 1960–1964
- Preceded by: Merle Welsh
- Succeeded by: V.J. Scogin

Louisiana Education Superintendent
- In office 1964–1972
- Preceded by: Shelby M. Jackson
- Succeeded by: Louis J. Michot

Personal details
- Born: William Joseph Dodd; November 25, 1909 Liberty, Texas, US
- Died: November 16, 1991 (aged 81) Baton Rouge, Louisiana, U.S.
- Party: Democratic
- Spouse: Verone Ford Dodd (m. 1939-his death)
- Relations: Long family
- Children: 2
- Occupation: Attorney; Politician

Military service
- Allegiance: United States
- Branch/service: United States Army
- Battles/wars: World War II

William Joseph Dodd (November 25, 1909 – November 16, 1991) was an American politician who held five positions in the Louisiana state government in the mid-20th century, including state representative, lieutenant governor, state auditor, president and member of the State Board of Education, and state education superintendent.

Dodd died of cancer in Baton Rouge General Medical Center on the day of the Edwin Edwards-David Duke gubernatorial showdown. Memorial services were held at his home church, the Southside Baptist Church in Baton Rouge on November 18, 1991, with John Robson officiating.

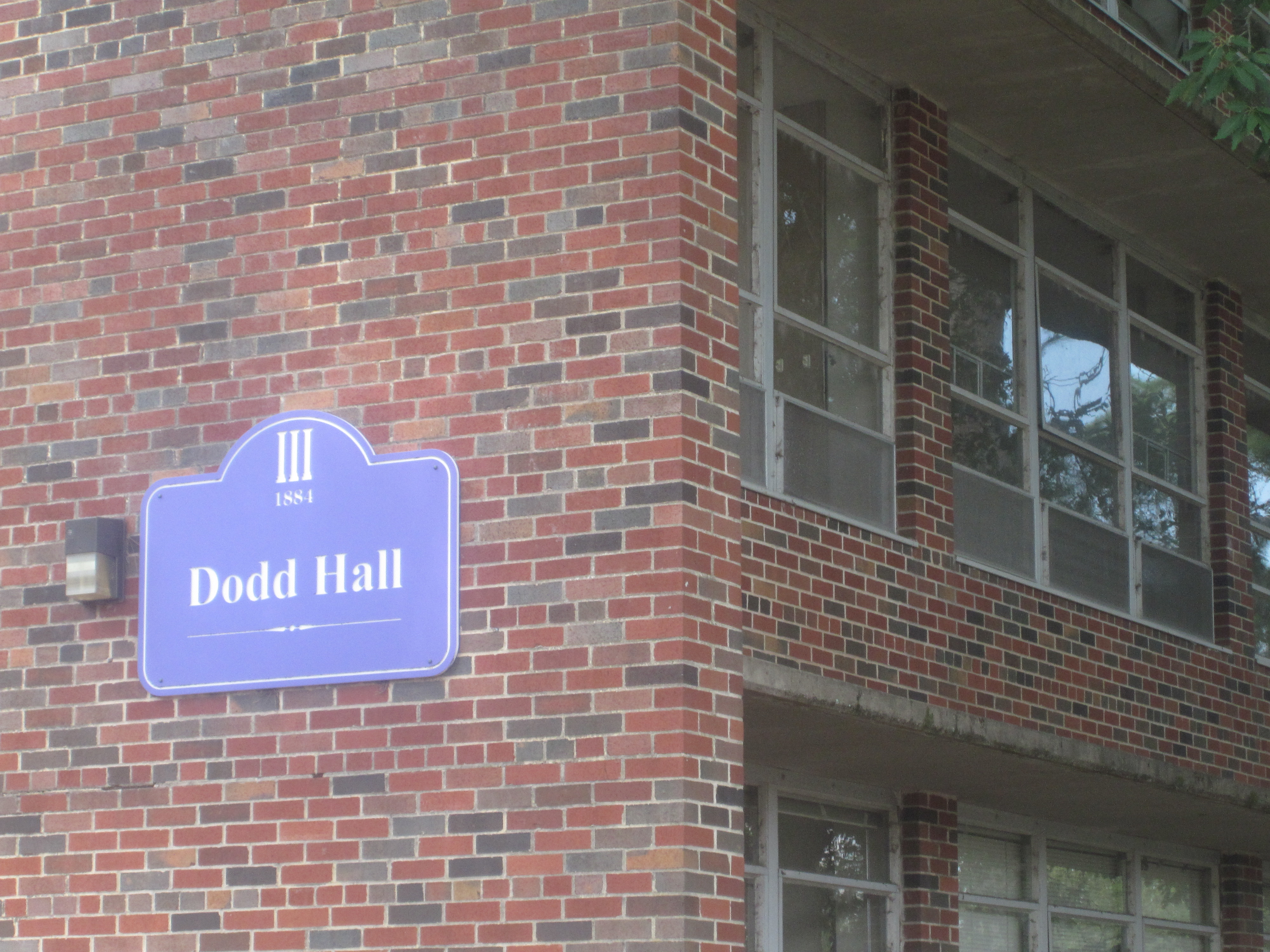
Dodd Hall at Northwestern State University in Natchitoches

Party political offices
Preceded by J. Emile Verret	Democratic nominee for Lieutenant Governor of Louisiana; 1948	Succeeded by C. E. Barham
Preceded by Shelby M. Jackson	Democratic nominee for Louisiana State Superintendent of Education; 1964, 1968	Succeeded by Louis J. Michot
Political offices
Preceded by David Cole	Louisiana State Representative from Allen Parish; 1940–1948	Succeeded by M.V. Hargrove
Preceded by J. Emile Verret	Lieutenant Governor of Louisiana; 1948–1952	Succeeded by C. E. "Cap" Barham
Preceded by Allison Kolb	Louisiana State Auditor (thereafter called Comptroller); 1956–1960	Succeeded by Roy R. Theriot
Preceded by Merle M. Welsh	Member, Louisiana State Board of Education; 1960–1964	Succeeded by V.J. Scogin
Preceded by Shelby M. Jackson	Louisiana State Superintendent of Education; 1964–1972	Succeeded by Louis J. Michot
