= 1944 Louisiana lieutenant gubernatorial election =

- April 18, 1944
| Nominee | J. Emile Verret |
| Party | Democratic |
| Popular vote | 51,391 |
| Percentage | 100.00% |
- Parish results Verret: 90–100%
Lieutenant Governor before election
Marc M. Mouton
Democratic
Elected Lieutenant Governor
J. Emile Verret
Democratic

The 1944 Louisiana lieutenant gubernatorial election was held on April 18, 1944, in order to elect the lieutenant governor of Louisiana. Democratic nominee J. Emile Verret won the election as he ran unopposed.

== Democratic primary ==
The Democratic primary election was held on January 18, 1944, but as no candidate received a majority of the votes cast, a runoff was held on February 29, 1944, between former governor Earl K. Long and candidate J. Emile Verret. Candidate J. Emile Verret won the runoff with 51.16% of the vote, and was thus elected as the nominee for the general election.

=== Results ===
| Candidate | First Round | | Run-off | |
| Candidate | Votes | % | Votes | % |
|---|---|---|---|---|
| J. Emile Verret | 128,232 | 27.64 | 237,452 | 51.16 |
| Earl K. Long | 194,155 | 41.85 | 226,649 | 48.84 |
| Frank Burton Ellis | 104,133 | 22.45 | | |
| Gladden Harrison | 21,752 | 4.69 | | |
| Sam Tennant | 8,714 | 1.88 | | |
| Carl T. Jeansonne | 6,961 | 1.50 | | |
| Total | 463,947 | 100.00 | 464,101 | 100.00 |

== General election ==
On election day, April 18, 1944, Democratic nominee J. Emile Verret won the election with 51,391 votes as he ran unopposed, thereby retaining Democratic control over the office of lieutenant governor. Verret was sworn in as the 41st lieutenant governor of Louisiana on May 9, 1944.

=== Results ===
Louisiana lieutenant gubernatorial election, 1944
| Party | Candidate | Votes | % |
|---|---|---|---|
| Democratic | J. Emile Verret | 51,391 | 100.00 |
| Total votes | | 51,391 | 100.00 |
| Democratic hold | | | |
