= FND =

FND may refer to:

== Medicine ==
- Frontonasal dysplasia, a facial malformation
- Functional neurological disorder, another name for functional neurological symptom disorder, which is associated with disordered movement, altered cognition, sensory dysfunction, and other seemingly neurological phenomena

== Politics ==
- National Democratic Front (Central African Republic) (French: Front National Démocratique)
- National Democratic Front, participant in the United Front of Political Parties and Civic Associations, Guatemala, 1944

== Other uses ==
- Floor & Decor, an American retailer of flooring
- FND Films, an American sketch comedy videos group
