= Marion Roach =

Marion Roach Smith (born April 7, 1956) is a non-fiction author and a former staff member of The New York Times who advocates "the power of the personal narrative".

== Books ==
Her first book, Another Name for Madness (1985), is a memoir that describes Alzheimer's effects on her mother (Allene Zillmann Roach) and the family problems that arose because of it. A reviewer for The Baltimore Sun described the book as "simply the best evocation of an insidious illness I have ever read." The book has been published in Canada, England, France, Japan, and the United States.

Roach wrote The Roots of Desire: The Myth, Meaning, and Sexual Power of Red Hair (2005), a non-fiction piece about the history and oddities of red heads and their reactions from society.

She is also the coauthor of Dead Reckoning: The New Science of Catching Killers with physician Michael Baden (2001), and the author of The Memoir Project: A Thoroughly Non-Standardized Text for Writing & Life (2011).

== Career ==
After graduating college, Roach was hired by The New York Times. At The Times, she worked as a copy person from 1977 to 1978, as a news clerk from 1978 to 1980, and as a news assistant from 1980 to 1983. Beginning in 1998, she has been an instructor at the Arts Center of the Capital Region in Troy, New York, of a class called "Writing What You Know" that teaches about writing memoirs.

Along with her books, Roach's writing has also been published in the New York Times Magazine, Vogue, Good Housekeeping, Discover, Prevention, and Newsday. She also works as a professor of a memoir course at the Arts Center of the Capital Region, New York; and works as a commentator on National Public Radio on the show "All Things Considered." She previously had a spot on Martha Stewart Living Radio Sirius 112 called "The Naturalist's Datebook". This daily radio show included facts, websites, books, poems and more concerning nature and naturalists. She started each piece with how many days of the year had elapsed since New Years, and quotes how many days since the new moon. Ms. Roach closed each Datebook with the phrase "And that's it for the Naturalist's Datebook... and remember: look around, write it down, and keep your eye on nature."

Roach testified before the United States House Permanent Select Committee on Aging in the mid-1980s to ask Congress to revise the insurance practice of labeling Alzheimer's disease as a custodial issue (non-medical care that assists people with day-to-day living such as eating or washing) instead of a medical one. She has served as a member of the board of directors for the Alzheimer's Resource Center. In addition to her emphasis on helping people affected by Alzheimer's, Roach has also worked with domestic-abuse survivors, people in recovery, and veterans of the Vietnam War.

== Personal life ==
Marion Roach was born on April 7, 1956, in Queens, New York City, to James Pilkington Roach, a sportswriter, and Allene Roach, a teacher. In 1977, she graduated cum laude from St. Lawrence University, where she is Board of Trustees member. Roach is married to the Times Union editor Rex Smith, and they have a daughter.
