= William Luther Hill =

American politician (1873–1951)

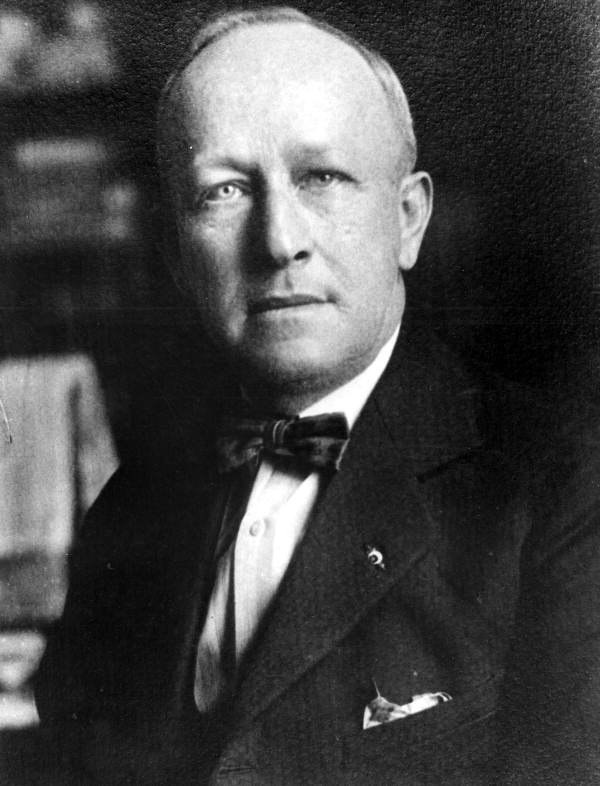

United States Senator from Florida
- In office July 1, 1936 – November 3, 1936
- Appointed by: David Sholtz
- Preceded by: Duncan U. Fletcher
- Succeeded by: Claude Pepper

Personal details
- Born: 17 October 1873 Gainesville, Florida, US
- Died: 5 January 1951 (aged 77) Gainesville, Florida, US
- Party: Democratic
- Education: University of Florida
- Profession: Attorney, United States Senate staff

William Luther Hill (October 17, 1873 – January 5, 1951) was a U.S. senator from Florida who served as a Democrat in 1936.

== Early life ==
William L. Hill was born in Gainesville, Alachua County, Florida on October 17, 1873. He attended the East Florida Seminary (now the University of Florida and became involved in banking and insurance.

== Career ==
In 1914, Hill graduated from the University of Florida Law School. He was admitted to the bar and practiced in Gainesville.

In 1917, Hill became Secretary (chief assistant) to Senator Duncan U. Fletcher, a post he held until Fletcher's death in 1936. From 1917 to 1921, Hill was also Clerk for the Senate Committee on Commerce, and he was Clerk for the Committee on Banking and Currency from 1933 to 1936.

== Senate appointment ==
When Fletcher died in 1936, Hill was appointed to fill the vacancy until a successor could be elected. He served from July 1, 1936, to November 3, 1936. Hill was not a candidate in the election, which was won by Claude Pepper.

After completing his Senate service Hill returned to Gainesville, where he practiced law and remained active in Democratic politics until retiring in 1947.

== Death and burial ==
Hill died in Gainesville on January 5, 1951, aged 77. He was buried in Gainesville's Evergreen Cemetery.

U.S. Senate
Preceded by Duncan U. Fletcher	United States Senator (Class 3) from Florida; 1936	Succeeded by Claude Pepper
