= Adrián Recinos =

Guatemalan historian

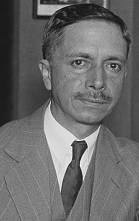
- Adrian Recinos of Guatemala with Dr. Rowe of CBS in 1930
- Born: July 5, 1886; Antigua Guatemala, Guatemala
- Died: March 8, 1962 (aged 75); Guatemala City, Guatemala
- Known for: Translations of Mayan manuscripts to Spanish
- Scientific career
- Fields: History

Adrián Recinos (July 5, 1886 – March 8, 1962) was a Guatemalan historian, essayist, Mayanist scholar and translator, and diplomat. Recinos was a student of national history, especially the Maya civilization and the ancient history of the K'iche' and Kaqchikel people.

He published the first Spanish edition of Popol Vuh, based on his translation of the manuscript found in the Newberry Library, Chicago. He also published his translations of other ancient Mayan manuscripts, including the Anales de los Cakchiqueles.

== Biography ==
Adrián Recinos was born on July 5, 1886, in Antigua Guatemala, as the son of Teodoro M. Recinos and Rafaela Ávila de Recinos. He married María Palomo and had five children, Beatrice, Isabel, Mary, Adrian Jr., and Laura. All four of his daughters would remain in Guatemala for the majority of their lives, and Adrian Jr. would attend Harvard University, and later became an M.D. in the U.S. while residing in Washington D.C.

Recinos obtained his bachelor's degree of Sciences and Letters in 1902, and graduated from the School of Law in Guatemala in 1907. He pursued a public career as a diplomat and was Secretary of Legation in El Salvador (1908), Under-Secretary of State (1910–1920), Minister of Foreign Affairs (1922–1923), Ambassador to France, Spain, and Italy (1923–1925), President of the Legislative Assembly (1926), and Ambassador to the USA (1928–1943). In 1944 he ran as a candidate to the Presidency of the Republic, but lost the elections to Juan José Arévalo.

He died in 1962.

== Legacy ==
Recinos had a passion for Guatemalan history and was a founding member of the Sociedad de Geografía e Historia de Guatemala, currently known as Academia de Geografía e Historia de Guatemala. He was also a member of the Sociedad de Geografía y Estadística (Mexico), Sociedad Histórica Americana (Buenos Aires), Instituto Iberico-Americano de Derecho Comparado (Madrid), amongst others.

Adrián Recinos received national and international recognition for his publications on Guatemala's history and his translations of ancient Mayan manuscripts.

== Published works ==
- Indigenous chronicles of Guatemala
- The City of Guatemala (historical description from its foundation to 1917-1918 earthquakes)
- Monographs of the Department of Huehuetenango

=== Original Spanish language editions ===
- Monografía del Departamento de Huehuetenango. Guatemala: Tipografía Sánchez & de Guise. 1913.
- Lecciones de filosofía. Guatemala: Tipografía Sánchez & de Guise. 1914.
- La ciudad de Guatemala, crónica histórica desde su fundación hasta los terremotos de 1917-1918. Guatemala: Adrián Recinos. 1922.
- Poesías de José Batres Montúfar (natural de Guatemala). Madrid: Imprenta Helénica. 1924.
- Popol Vuh: las antiguas historias del quiché. Mexico: Fondo de Cultura Económica. 1947.
- Título de los señores de Totonicapán traducción y notas. 1949.
- Memorial de Sololá, Anales de los cakchiqueles; / traducción directa del original, introducción y notas de Adrián Recinos. Título de los señores de Totonicapán; traducción del original quiché por Dionisio José Chonay, introducción y notas de Adrián Recinos. Mexico: Fondo de Cultura Economica. 1950.
- Pedro de Alvarado: conquistador de México y Guatemala. Mexico: Fondo de Cultura Económica. 1952.
- Crónicas indígenas de Guatemala. Guatemala: Universidad de San Carlos. 1957.
- Doña Leonor de Alvarado y otros estudios. Guatemala: Editorial Universitaria. 1958.
