= 1940 Louisiana lieutenant gubernatorial election =

- April 16, 1940
Nominee	Marc M. Mouton
Party	Democratic
Popular vote	225,151
Percentage	100.00%
- Parish results Mouton: 90–100%
Lieutenant Governor before election
Coleman Lindsey (Acting)
Democratic
Elected Lieutenant Governor
Marc M. Mouton
Democratic

The 1940 Louisiana lieutenant gubernatorial election was held on April 16, 1940, in order to elect the lieutenant governor of Louisiana. Democratic nominee Marc M. Mouton won the election as he ran unopposed.

== General election ==
On election day, April 16, 1940, Democratic nominee Marc M. Mouton won the election with 225,151 votes as he ran unopposed, thereby retaining Democratic control over the office of lieutenant governor. Mouton was sworn in as the 40th lieutenant governor of Louisiana on May 14, 1940.

=== Results ===
Louisiana lieutenant gubernatorial election, 1940
Party	Candidate	Votes	%
Democratic	Marc M. Mouton	225,151	100.00
Total votes		225,151	100.00
Democratic hold			
