= 1944 Guatemalan presidential election =

- 17–19 December 1944
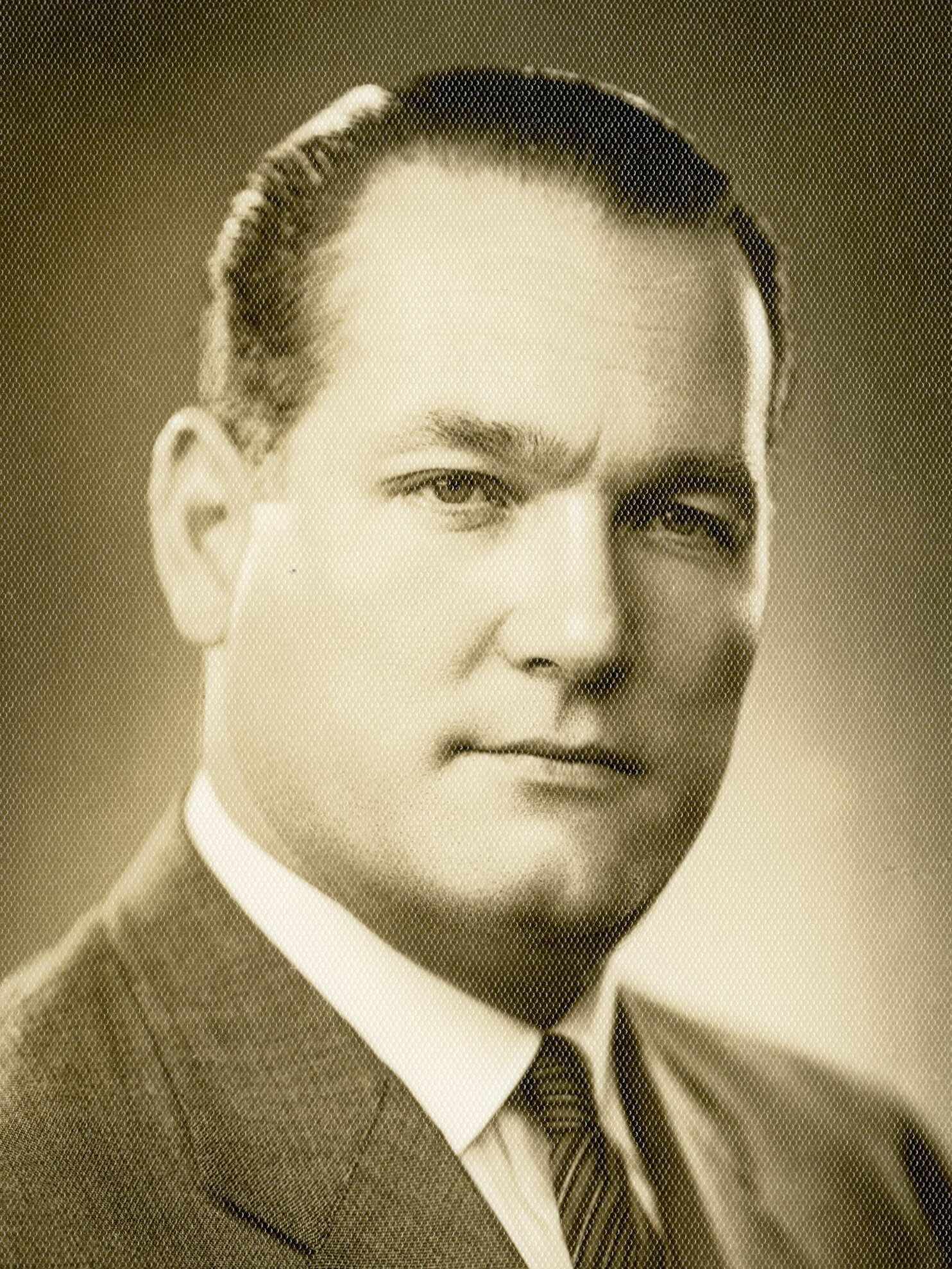

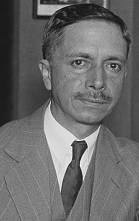
Nominee	Juan José Arévalo	Adrián Recinos
Party	FUPA	FND–PDC
Popular vote	255,660	20,949
Percentage	86.25%	7.07%
Triumvirates before election
Árbenz, Arana, Toriello
Guatemalan Revolution
President-elect
Juan José Arévalo
FUPA

Presidential elections were held in Guatemala between 17 and 19 December 1944. The October Revolution had overthrown Jorge Ubico, the American-backed dictator, after which a junta composed of Francisco Javier Arana, Jacobo Árbenz and Jorge Toriello took power, and quickly announced presidential elections, as well as elections for a constitutional assembly. The subsequent elections were broadly considered free and fair, although only literate men were given the vote. Unlike in similar historical situations, none of the junta members stood for election. The front-runner was the university professor Juan José Arévalo, nominated by the National Renovation Party. His closest challenger was Adrián Recinos, whose campaign included a number of individuals identified with the Ubico regime. The ballots were tallied on 19 December and Arévalo won in a landslide with 86.25% of the vote, receiving more than four times as many votes as the other candidates combined. The Constitutional Assembly elections took place on 28–30 December, with the United Front of Arevalist Parties winning 50 of the 65 seats.

== Results ==
Candidate	Party	Votes	%
Juan José Arévalo	United Front of Arevalist Parties	255,660	86.25
Adrián Recinos	FND–PDC	20,949	7.07
Manuel María Herrera	Workers Republican-Democratic Party	11,062	3.73
Guillermo Flores Avendaño	Social Democratic Party	8,230	2.78
Teófilo Díaz Medrano	Democratic Constitutionalist Party	342	0.12
Bernardo Alvarado Tello	Popular Liberation Front	115	0.04
Ovidio Pivaral	Democratic Party	22	0.01
Francisco Javier Arana	Popular Liberation	12	0.00
Clemente Marroquín	National Accord Party	5	0.00
José Gregorio Díaz	Nationalist Action Party	5	0.00
Luis Cardoza y Aragón		3	0.00
Miguel Ydígoras Fuentes		2	0.00
Humberto Robles		2	0.00
Jorge Toriello Garrido	Civic Union	2	0.00
Julio Bianchi	Central-American party	1	0.00
Manuel Galich	Popular Liberation Front	1	0.00
Eugenio Silva Peña	Social Democratic Party	1	0.00
Total		296,414	100.00
Valid votes		296,414	98.00
Invalid/blank votes		6,042	2.00
Total votes		302,456	100.00
Registered voters/turnout		310,000	97.57
Source: Prensa Libre, Nohlen

== Bibliography ==
- Villagrán Kramer, Francisco. Biografía política de Guatemala: años de guerra y años de paz. FLACSO-Guatemala, 2004.
- Political handbook of the world 1946. New York, 1945.
- Rodríguez de Ita, Guadalupe. 2003. La participación política en la primavera guatemalteca: una aproximación a la historia de los partidos durante el periodo 1944–1954. México: Universidad Autónoma del Estado de México, Universidad Nacional Autónoma de México.
- El estado y los partidos politicos en Guatemala, 1944–1951. by José Campang Chang Published in 1992, Universidad de San Carlos de Guatemala ([Guatemala])
- Castillo, R. Geografía Electoral de Guatemala, Guatemala, INCEP, 1972.
