= Claude Pepper =

American politician (1900–1989)

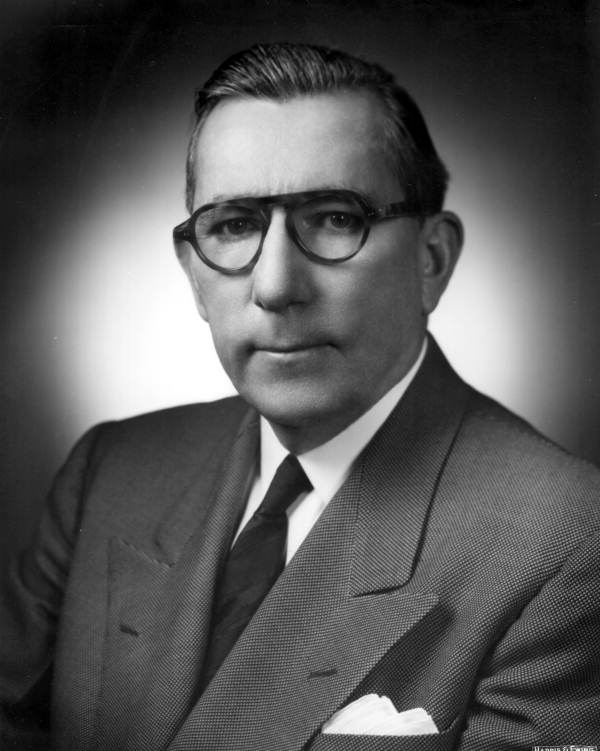
- Pepper, c. 1940

Chair of the House Rules Committee
- In office January 3, 1983 – May 30, 1989
- Preceded by: Richard W. Bolling
- Succeeded by: Joe Moakley

Member of the U.S. House of Representatives from Florida
- In office January 3, 1963 – May 30, 1989
- Preceded by: New district (redistricting)
- Succeeded by: Ileana Ros-Lehtinen
- Constituency: 3rd district (1963–1967); 11th district (1967–1973); 14th district (1973–1983); 18th district (1983–1989)

United States Senator from Florida
- In office November 4, 1936 – January 3, 1951
- Preceded by: William Luther Hill
- Succeeded by: George Smathers

Member of the Florida House of Representatives from the Taylor County district
- In office 1929–1931
- Preceded by: W. T. Hendry
- Succeeded by: Anton H. Wentworth

Personal details
- Born: Claude Denson Pepper; September 8, 1900 near Dudleyville, Alabama, U.S.
- Died: May 30, 1989 (aged 88) Washington, D.C., U.S.
- Party: Democratic
- Spouse: Mildred Webster (m. 1936; died 1979)
- Education: University of Alabama (AB); Harvard University (LLB)

Military service
- Allegiance: United States
- Branch/service: United States Army
- Years of service: 1918
- Rank: Private
- Unit: Student Army Training Corps
- Battles/wars: World War I
- Claude Pepper's voice Claude Pepper on homelessness in the United States; Recorded March 24, 1984

Claude Denson Pepper (September 8, 1900 – May 30, 1989) was an American politician of the Democratic Party. He represented Florida in the United States Senate from 1936 to 1951, and the Miami area in the United States House of Representatives from 1963 until his death in 1989. He was considered a spokesman for left-liberalism and the elderly.

Born in Chambers County, Alabama, Pepper established a legal practice in Perry, Florida, after graduating from Harvard Law School. After serving a single term in the Florida House of Representatives, Pepper won a 1936 special election to succeed Senator Duncan U. Fletcher. Pepper became one of the most prominent liberals in Congress, supporting legislation such as the Fair Labor Standards Act of 1938. After World War II, Pepper's conciliatory views towards the Soviet Union and opposition to President Harry Truman's 1948 re-nomination engendered opposition within the party. Pepper lost the 1950 Senate Democratic primary to Representative George Smathers, and returned to private legal practice the following year.

In 1962, Pepper won election to a newly created district in the United States House of Representatives. He emerged as a staunch anti-Communist, and strongly criticized Cuban leader Fidel Castro. Pepper served as chairman of the House Committee on Aging, and pursued reforms to Social Security and Medicare. From 1983 to 1989, he served as chairman of the powerful House Rules Committee. He died in office in 1989, and was honored with a state funeral. In 2000, the United States Postal Service issued a 33¢ Distinguished Americans series postage stamp honoring Pepper.

== Early life ==
Claude Denson Pepper was born in Chambers County, Alabama on September 8, 1900, the son of farmers Lena Corine Talbot (1877–1961) and Joseph Wheeler Pepper (1873–1945). Pepper was the fourth child born to his parents; the first three died in infancy. Pepper was an only child until he was ten years old; his younger siblings were Joseph, Sara and Frank. He attended school in Dudleyville and Camp Hill, and graduated from Camp Hill High School in 1917. He then operated a hat cleaning and repair business, taught school in Dothan and worked at an Ensley steel mill before beginning studies at the University of Alabama.

While in college he joined the Army for World War I and served in the Student Army Training Corps (SATC, precursor to the Reserve Officers' Training Corps). The war ended before he saw active service, and after the SATC was disbanded, Pepper joined the ROTC. While lifting ammunition crates during a training event, Pepper suffered a double hernia, which required surgery to correct. After graduating from the University of Alabama with his A.B. degree in 1921, Pepper was able to use his veterans' and disability benefits to attend Harvard Law School, and he received his LL.B. in 1924.

== Career ==
Pepper taught law at the University of Arkansas (where his students included J. William Fulbright) and then moved to Perry, Florida, where he opened a law practice. Pepper was a member of the Florida Democratic Party's executive committee from 1928 to 1929.

He was elected to the Florida House of Representatives in 1928 and served from 1929 to 1931. During his term, Pepper served as chairman of the House's Committee on Constitutional Amendments. In response to the Great Depression, Governor Doyle E. Carlton proposed austerity measures including layoffs of state employees and large tax cuts. Pepper was among those who opposed Carlton's program, and popular support was with Carlton, so Pepper was among many legislators who lost when they ran for renomination in 1930.

After being defeated for renomination, Pepper moved his law practice to Tallahassee, the state capital. In 1931, he met Mildred Webster outside the governor's office. They began dating, and they married in St. Petersburg on December 29, 1936. They remained married until her death in 1979, and had no children.

=== Florida government ===
Pepper served on the Florida Board of Public Welfare from 1931 to 1932, and was a member of the Florida Board of Bar Examiners in 1933.

=== U.S. Senate ===
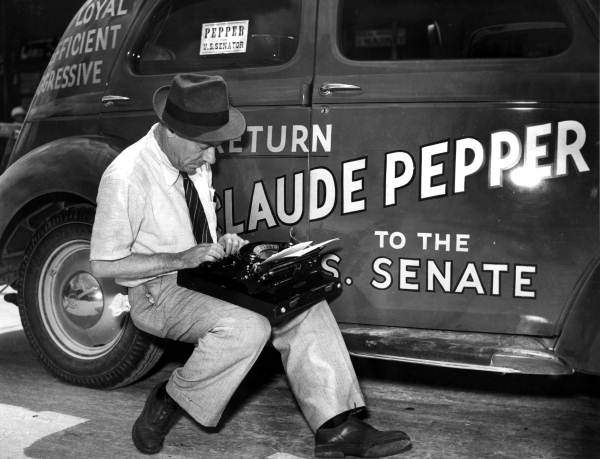
Newsman covering U.S. Senator Claude Pepper's campaign in 1938.

In 1934, Pepper ran for the Democratic nomination for U.S. Senate, challenging incumbent Park Trammell. Pepper lost to Trammell in the primary runoff 51%–49% in a close race. The race had voter fraud in it especially from Tampa which was done in favor of Trammell. Pepper never challenged the election results. Trammell was a southern conservative who moderately supported the New Deal while Pepper was a progressive who was strongly in favor of the New Deal.

However when Pepper ran again in the 1936 US Senate special election following the death of Senator Duncan U. Fletcher, and succeeded William Luther Hill, who had been appointed pending the special election. Pepper was unopposed in the race and won. In the Senate, Pepper became a leading New Dealer and close ally of President Franklin Delano Roosevelt. While serving as a Senator he defied tradition by speaking on the Senate floor as a freshman Senator which resulted in much media attention being paid to him. In 1937, he joined other Southern senators to filibuster an anti-lynching bill, but broke with them to support anti-poll tax legislation in the 1940s, and the popular account of the Senate Citadel said that Pepper had broken totally with the Southern Caucus. Pepper still supported some aspects of Southern white supremacy such as the all white Primary because he "thought that a Senator from the South had to do that". In 1938 he ran for reelection with the backing of President Roosevelt which he won. He was unusually articulate and intellectual, and, collaborating with labor unions, he was often the leader of the liberal-left forces in the Senate. His campaign based on a wages-hours bill, which soon became the Fair Labor Standards Act of 1938. He was a supporter of interventionism prior to World War II and was one of the first Members of Congress to call for destroyers to be transferred to the United Kingdom and supported a military draft in 1939. He also introduced an original version of the Lend-Lease Act. He later voted for it when the time came.

In 1943, a confidential analysis by Isaiah Berlin of the Senate Foreign Relations Committee for the British Foreign Office described Pepper as:

A loud-voiced and fiery New Deal politician. Before Pearl Harbor, he was a most ardent interventionist. He is equally Russophile and apt to be critical of British Imperial policy. He is an out and out internationalist and champion of labour and negro rights (Florida has no poll tax) and thus a passionate supporter of the Administration's more internationalist policies. He is occasionally used by the President for the purpose of sending up trial balloons in matters of foreign policy. With all these qualities, he is, in his methods, a thoroughly opportunist politician.

Because of the power of the Conservative Coalition, he usually lost on domestic policy. He was, however, more successful in promoting an international foreign policy based on friendship with the Soviet Union. In 1946, Pepper appeared frequently in the national press and began to eye the 1948 presidential race. He considered running with his close friend and fellow liberal, former Vice President Henry A. Wallace, with whom he was active in the Southern Conference for Human Welfare.

Pepper ran again for reelection in 1944 with the backing of President Roosevelt and faced four challengers in the Democratic primary election: Millard Conklin, Finley Moore, Alston Cockrell and J. Ollie Edmunds who was the more prominent candidate in the race and was a judge from Jacksonville. Edmunds had previously supported Pepper but had a previous history of being largely politically uninvolved and was little known outside Jacksonville. However he made an effort to reach out and visited all 67 counties. During the campaign Edmunds differentiated himself from Pepper by positioning himself as being a critic of President Roosevelt wanting to keep the New Deal status quo and was more socially conservative while Pepper wanted to see New Deal programs be expanded. During the race Conklin who was a staunch white supremacist attacked Pepper's racial positions which the Edmunds campaign picked up on by asking why he visited an African-American church in 1942 in Los Angeles. In the end Pepper won the primary getting 51.8% of the vote and won the general election defeating the Republican candidate Miles Draper.

==== "Eisenhower Boom" ====
By 1947, momentum was growing for the Draft Eisenhower movement which wanted General Dwight D. Eisenhower, former Chief of Staff of the United States Army, to run for president. On September 10, 1947, Eisenhower disclaimed any association with the movement. In mid-September 1947, US Representative W. Sterling Cole of New York voiced opposition to the nomination of Eisenhower or any other military leader, including George C. Marshall and Douglas MacArthur. In December 1947, an actor impersonating Eisenhower sang "Kiss Me Again" during a political dinner in Washington, DC, whose attendees including President Truman (Democratic incumbent) and numerous Republican potential candidates: the song's refrain ran "but it's too soon. Some time next June, ask me, ask me again, ask me, ask me again."

On April 3, 1948, Americans for Democratic Action (ADA), led by members Adolf A. Berle Jr. and Franklin Delano Roosevelt Jr., declared its decision to support a ticket of Eisenhower and Supreme Court Justice William O. Douglas. On April 5, 1948, Eisenhower stated his position remained unchanged: he would not accept a nomination. In mid-April 1948, American labor unions had entered the debate, as William B. Green, president of the American Federation of Labor, criticized the Congress of Industrial Organizations (CIO) for supporting the "Eisenhower Boom".

On July 2, 1948, the White House sent George E. Allen, friend and adviser to both Truman and Eisenhower, to the general to persuade him to make yet another denial about his candidacy. On July 3, 1948, Democratic state organizations in Georgia and Virginia openly backed Eisenhower, as did former New York state court judge Jeremiah T. Mahoney. The same day, Progressive presumptive candidate Wallace scorned the Eisenhower boom's southern supporters, saying, "They have reason to believe that Ike is reactionary because of his testimony on the draft and UMT [Universal Military Training]." On July 4, 1948, rumors abounded, e.g., Eisenhower would accept an "honest draft" or (from the Los Angeles Times) Eisenhower would accept the nomination if made by Truman himself. On July 5, 1948, a New York Times survey completed the previous day revealed that support for Eisenhower as Democratic nominee for president was "increasing among delegates", fueled by an "Anti-Truman Group" led by James Roosevelt of California, Jacob Arvey of Illinois, and William O'Dwyer of New York. US Senator John C. Stennis of Mississippi declared his support for Eisenhower. At 10:30 PM that night, Eisenhower issued an internal memo at Columbia for release by the university's PR director that "I will not, at this time, identify myself with any political party, and could not accept nomination for public office or participate in a partisan political contest." Support persisted nonetheless, and on July 6, 1948, a local Philadelphia group seized on Eisenhower's phrases about "political party" and "partisan political contest" and declared their continued support for him. The same day, Truman supporters expressed their satisfaction with the Eisenhower memo and confidence in the nomination. By July 7, 1948, the week before the 1948 Democratic National Convention, the Draft Eisenhower movement drifted onwards, despite flat denials by Eisenhower and despite public declarations of confidence by Truman and Democratic Party national chairman J. Howard McGrath. Nevertheless, 5,000 admirers gathered in front of Eisenhower's Columbia residence to ask him to run.

In 1948, Pepper supported not his friend Henry A. Wallace but Eisenhower. In fact, on July 7, 1948, Pepper went further than any other supporter with an extraordinary proposal:

Senator Claude Pepper of Florida called on the Democratic party today to transform itself temporarily into a national movement, draft Gen. Dwight D. Eisenhower as a "national" and hence "nonpartisan" Presidential candidate and promise him substantial control of the party's national convention opening in Philadelphia next week.
It would be necessary, Mr. Pepper suggested, for the convention to invite General Eisenhower to write his own platform and to pick the vice presidential nominee.
Moreover, the Senator said, the general should be assured that the Democrats would never make partisan claims on him, and he should be presented not as a "Democratic" candidate but the candidate of a convention "speaking not as Democrats but simply as Americans."

Pepper managed to gain support from ADA. The Draft Ike movement gained support from the CIO, the Liberal Party of New York State, Democratic local leaders (Jacob Arvey of Chicago, Frank Hague of New Jersey, Mayor William O'Dwyer of New York City, and Mayor Hubert Humphrey of Minneapolis), as well as ADA leaders Leon Henderson and James Roosevelt II. Eisenhower made repeated statements that he would not accept the Democratic Party's nomination well into July, just ahead of the 1948 Democratic National Convention. When Eisenhower, who accepted to become president of Columbia University in January 1948) made three statements refusing the nomination during July 1948, Pepper and others gave up and provided lukewarm support to Harry S. Truman. His third and last denial, sent by telegram to Pepper, ended the "Eisenhower Boom", and delegates began to reconsider Truman. (Pepper also made a bid for presidential candidacy but withdrew it.) On the evening of July 9, 1948, Roosevelt conceded at "Eisenhower-for-President headquarters" that the general would not accept a nomination. During the convention (July 12–14, 1948) and after, concern persisted that the Eisenhower Boom had weakened Truman's hopes in the November 1948 elections.

In 1950, Pepper lost his bid for a third full term in 1950 by a margin of over 60,000 votes. Ed Ball, a power in state politics who had broken with Pepper, financed his opponent, U.S. Representative George A. Smathers. A former supporter of Pepper, Smathers repeatedly attacked "Red Pepper" for having far-left sympathies, condemning both his support for universal health care and his alleged support for the Soviet Union. Pepper had traveled to the Soviet Union in 1945 and, after meeting Soviet leader Joseph Stalin, declared he was "a man Americans could trust." Because of his left-of-center sympathies with people like Wallace and actor-activist Paul Robeson and because of his bright red hair, he became widely nicknamed "Red Pepper".

At a speech made on November 11, 1946, before a pro-Soviet group known as Ambijan, which supported the creation of a Soviet Jewish republic in the far east of the USSR, Pepper told his listeners that "Probably nowhere in the world are minorities given more freedom, recognition and respect than in the Soviet Union [and] nowhere in the world is there so little friction, between minority and majority groups, or among minorities." Democracy was "growing" in that country, he added, and he asserted that the Soviets were making such contributions to democracy "that many who decry it might well imitate and emulate rather than despair."

Two years later, on November 21, 1948, speaking to the same group, he again lauded the Soviet Union, calling it a nation which has recognized the dignity of all people, a nation wherein discrimination against anybody on account of race is a crime, and which was in fundamental sympathy with the progress of mankind.

==== Communist allegations ====
Regarding the 1950 Florida Senate election, President Harry Truman called George Smathers into a meeting at the White House and reportedly said, "I want you to do me a favor. I want you to beat that son-of-a-bitch Claude Pepper." Pepper had been part of an unsuccessful 1948 campaign to "dump Truman" as the Democratic presidential nominee. Smathers ran against him in the Democratic primary (which at the time in Florida was tantamount to election, the Republican Party still being in infancy there). The contest was extremely heated, and revolved around policy issues, especially charges that Pepper represented the far left and was too supportive of Stalin. Pepper's opponents circulated widely a 49-page booklet titled The Red Record of Senator Claude Pepper. Pepper was defeated in the primary by Smathers.

=== Law practice ===
Pepper returned to law practice in Miami and Washington, failing in a comeback bid to regain a Senate seat in the 1958 Democratic primary in which he challenged his former colleague, Spessard Holland. However, Pepper did carry eleven counties, including populous Dade County where he later staged a remarkable comeback.

=== U.S. House ===
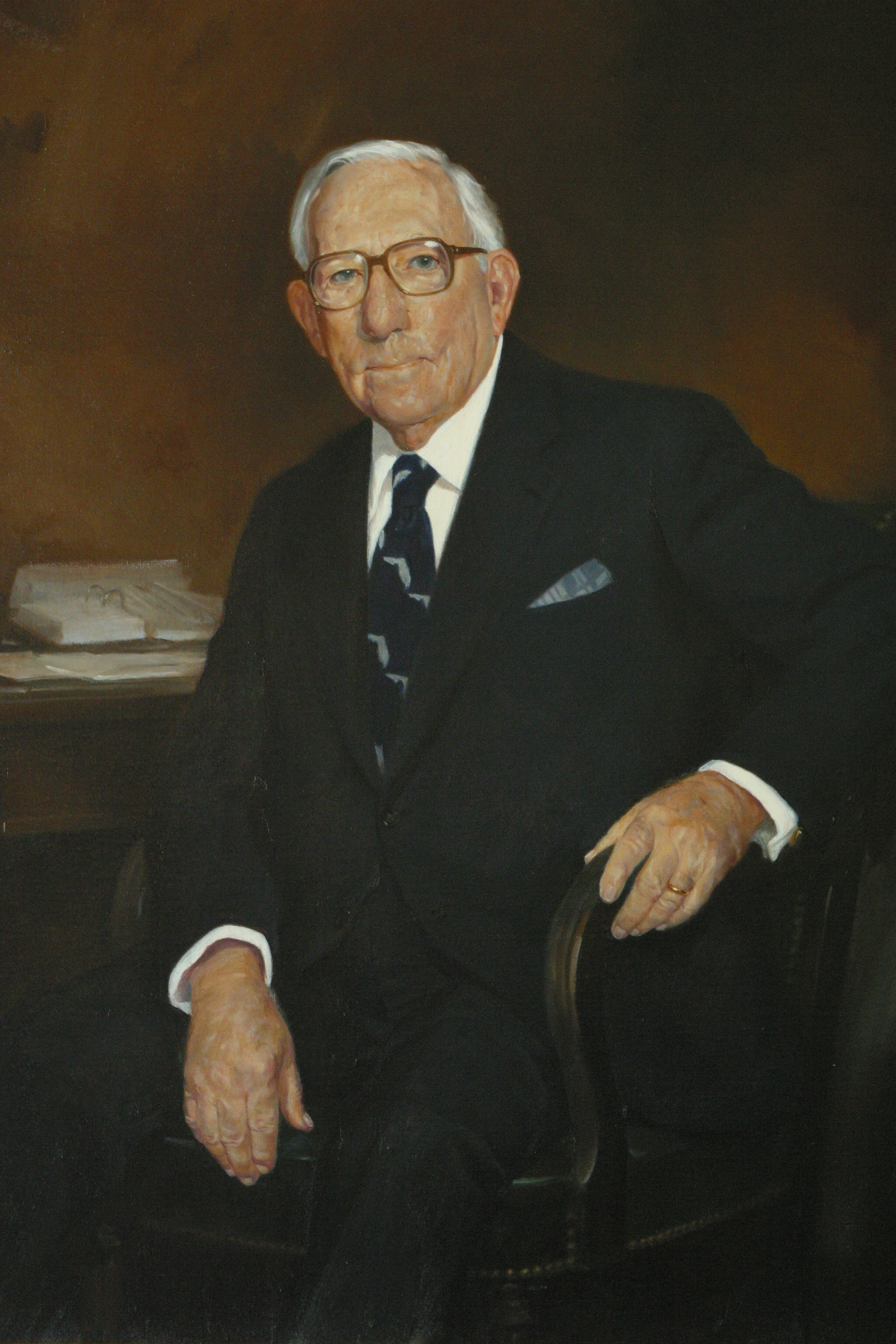
Portrait of Pepper in the Collection of the U.S. House of Representatives

In 1962, Pepper was elected to the United States House of Representatives from a newly created liberal district around Miami and Miami Beach established due to population growth in the area, becoming one of very few former United States Senators in modern times (the only other examples being James Wolcott Wadsworth Jr. from New York, Hugh Mitchell from Washington, Alton Lennon from North Carolina, Garrett Withers from Kentucky, and Magnus Johnson from Minnesota) to be elected to the House after their Senate careers. (Matthew M. Neely from West Virginia and Charles A. Towne from New York via Minnesota were also elected to the House after their Senate careers, but they had been elected to the House before their Senate careers as well.)

Pepper remained a member of the House until his death in 1989, rising to chair of the powerful Rules Committee in 1983. Despite a reputation as a leftist in his youth, Pepper turned staunchly anti-communist in the last third of his life, opposing Cuban leader Fidel Castro, supporting aid to the Nicaraguan Contras and voting in favor of the Gulf of Tonkin Resolution in 1964. He was a cosponsor of the Comprehensive Anti-Apartheid Act and was not present during the first time it was voted on in the House but did vote in favor of it during the second time when President Reagan vetoed it which was overridden.

Pepper voted in favor of a number of civil rights movement legislation such as the Civil Rights Acts of 1964 being the only Representative from Florida to vote for it. He also voted in favor of the Voting Rights Act of 1965, the Civil Rights Act of 1968 and the Hart-Celler Act.

In regards to other causes beyond foreign affairs and civil rights, he also voted in favor of the Clean Air Act of 1963, and the Clean Water Act of 1972 including when it was vetoed by President Nixon. He also voted for the Social Security Amendments of 1965 which created Medicare.

Pepper (third from right) attending the 1974 dedication of Roberto Clemente Park in Miami alongside other dignitaries

In the early 1970s, Pepper chaired the Joint House–Senate Committee on Crime; then, in 1977, he became chair of the new House Select Committee on Aging, which became his base as he emerged as the nation's foremost spokesman for the elderly, especially regarding Social Security programs. He succeeded in strengthening Medicare. In 1980 the committee under Pepper's leadership initiated what became a four-year investigation into health care scams that preyed on older people; the report, published in 1984 and commonly called "The Pepper Report", was entitled "Quackery, a $10 Billion Scandal".

In the 1980s, he worked with Alan Greenspan in a major reform of the Social Security system that maintained its solvency by slowly raising the retirement age, thus cutting benefits for workers retiring in their mid-60s, and in 1986 he obtained the passage of a federal law that abolished most mandatory retirement ages. In his later years, Pepper, who customarily began each day by eating a bowl of tomato soup with crackers, sported a replaced hip and hearing aids in both ears, but continued to remain an important and often lionized figure in the House.

In 1988, Pepper sponsored a legislation to create the National Center for Biotechnology Information (NCBI). Enacted during his final term, the NCBI has revolutionized the exchange, sharing and analysis of genetic information and aided researchers worldwide to achieve advances in medical, computational and biological sciences.

Pepper became known as the "grand old man of Florida politics". He was featured on the cover of Time magazine in 1938 and 1983. During this time, Republicans often joked that he and House Speaker Tip O'Neill were the only Democrats who really drove President Ronald Reagan crazy.

== Personal life and death ==
On May 26, 1989, Pepper was presented with the Presidential Medal of Freedom by President George H. W. Bush. Four days later, Pepper died in his sleep from stomach cancer. His body lay in state for two days in the Rotunda of the U.S. Capitol; he was the 26th American so honored and was the last person to lie in state in the Capitol rotunda with an open casket. Pepper was buried at Oakland Cemetery in Tallahassee. A special election was held in August 1989 to fill his seat, won by Republican Ileana Ros-Lehtinen, who served until retiring at the conclusion of the 115th Congress.

== Legacy ==
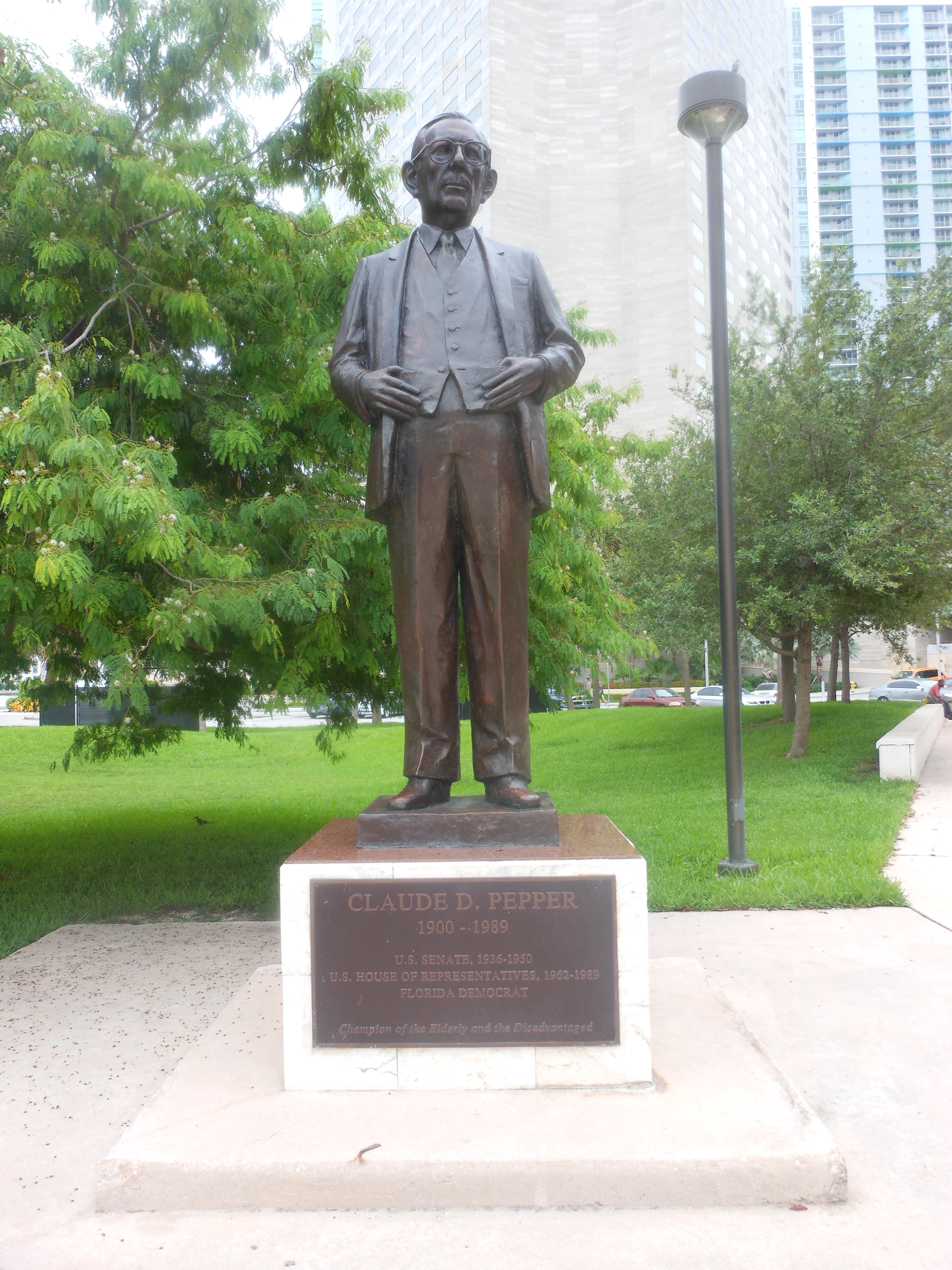
Statue of Claude Pepper in Miami

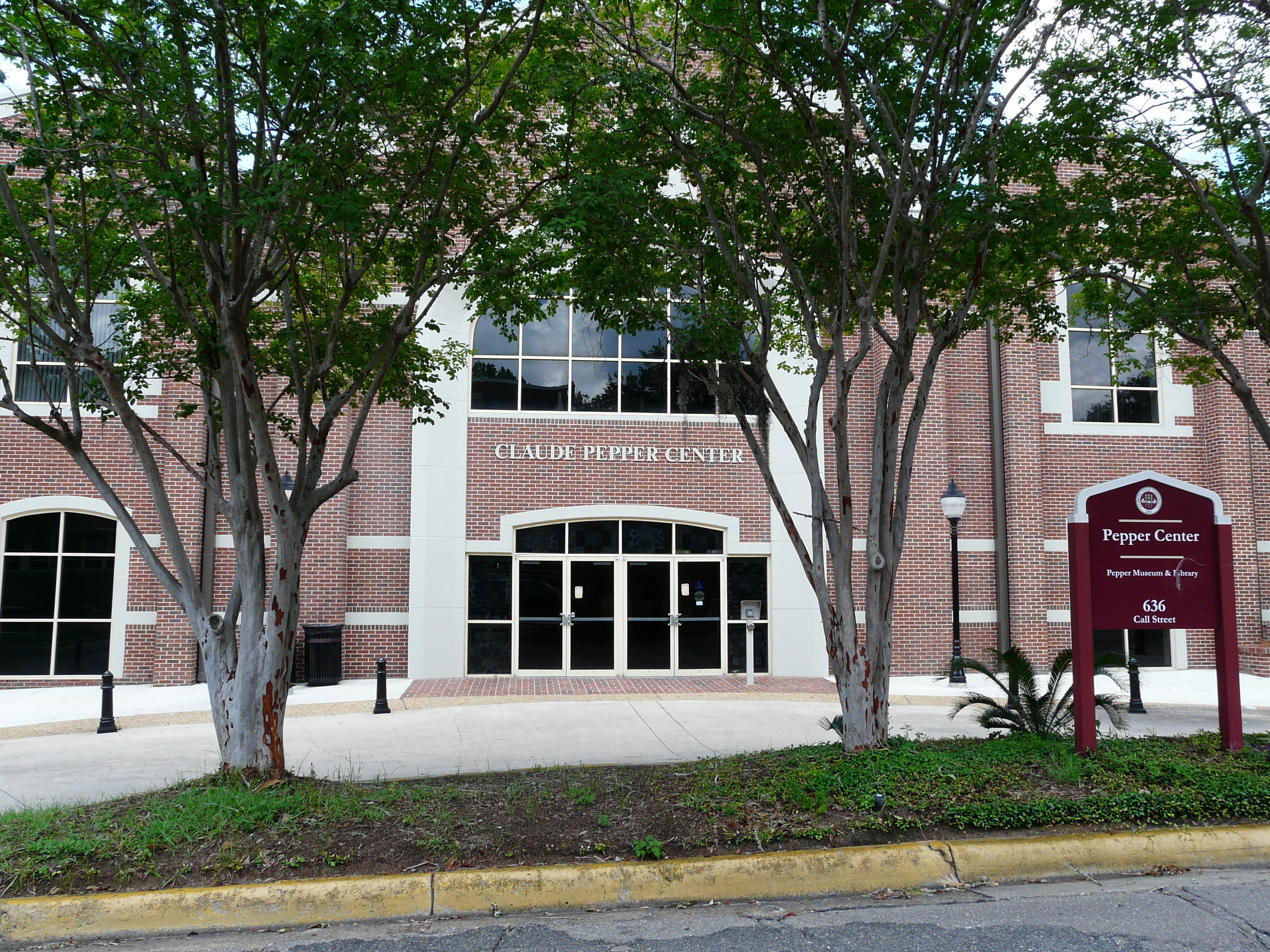
The Claude Pepper Center at Florida State University

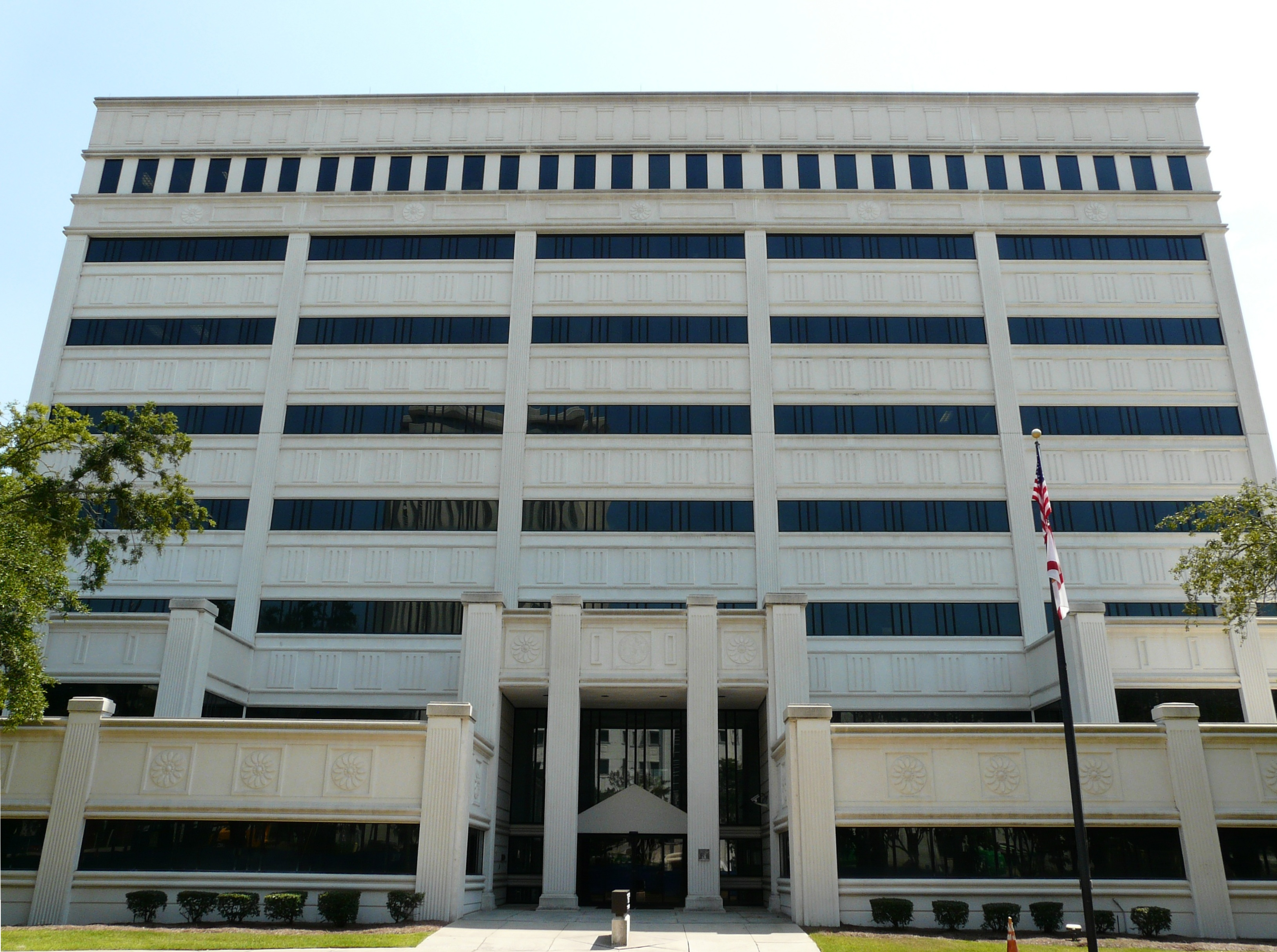
Claude Denson Pepper Building in downtown Tallahassee, Florida

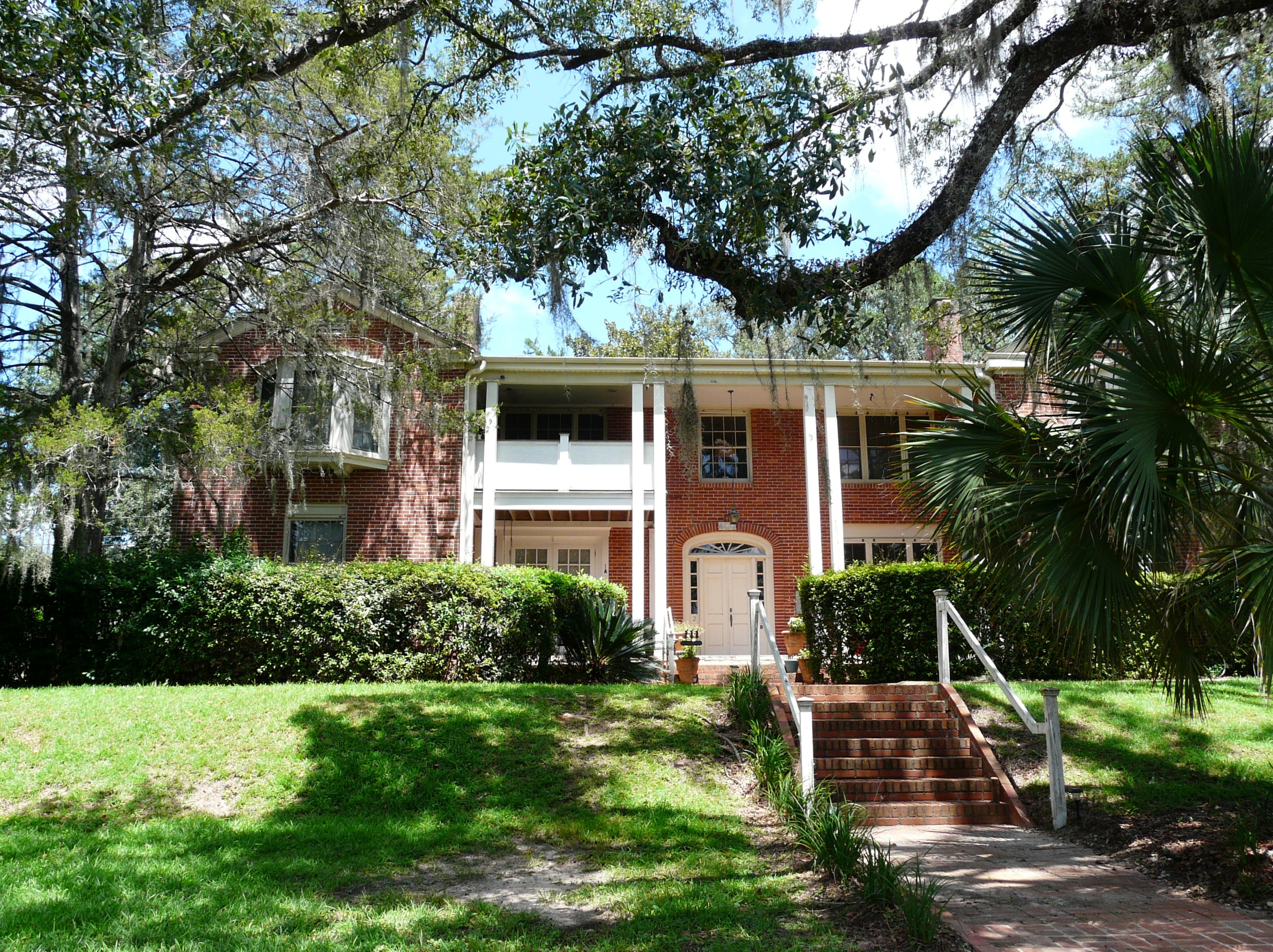
Pepper's mansion in Tallahassee

A number of places in Florida are named for Pepper, including the Claude Pepper Center at Florida State University (housing a think tank devoted to intercultural dialogue in conjunction with the United Nations Alliance of Civilizations and an institute on aging) and the Claude Pepper Federal Building in Miami, as well as several public schools. Large sections of U.S. Route 27 in Florida are named Claude Pepper Memorial Highway. Since 2002, the Democratic Executive Committee (DEC) of Lake County has held an annual "Claude Pepper Dinner" to honor Pepper's tireless support for senior citizens. The Claude Pepper Building (building number 31) at the National Institutes of Health in Bethesda, Maryland is also named for him.

Pepper's wife Mildred was well known and respected for her humanitarian work and was honored with a number of places in Florida named in her honor. A year after his passing, Claude Pepper was honored in a play written by Shepard Nevel and directed by Phillip Church. Pepper premiered in June 1990 to a full house at the Colony Theater in Miami Beach. In 1993, Bradenton, Florida actor Kelly Reynolds portrayed Pepper in several performances held at area schools, libraries and nursing homes.

== Awards ==
In 1982, Pepper received the Award for Greatest Public Service Benefiting the Disadvantaged, an annual presentation of the Jefferson Awards.

In 1983, he received the Golden Plate Award of the American Academy of Achievement.

In 1985, the Roosevelt Institute awarded Pepper its Four Freedoms medal.

Also in 1985, Pepper was awarded a Doctor of Humane Letters from Florida State University for his public service.

Pepper was posthumously inducted into the Florida Civil Rights Hall of Fame on February 29, 2012, in a ceremony held by Florida Governor Rick Scott in the Florida State Capitol. He was one of the first three inductees, along with Mary McLeod Bethune and Charles Kenzie Steele Sr.

== Bibliography ==
- Eyewitness to a Century with Hays Gorey (1987) – an autobiography

== See also ==
- List of members of the United States Congress who died in office (1950–1999)
- List of members of the American Legion
- List of members of the House Un-American Activities Committee
- Draft Eisenhower movement

== Footnotes ==
Party political offices
Preceded by Duncan U. Fletcher	Democratic nominee for U.S. Senator from Florida (Class 3); 1936, 1938, 1944	Succeeded by George Smathers
U.S. Senate
Preceded by William Luther Hill	U.S. Senator (Class 3) from Florida; 1936–1951; Served alongside: Charles O. Andrews, Spessard Holland	Succeeded by George Smathers
Preceded by Homer Bone	Chair of the Senate Patents Committee; 1944–1947	Position abolished
U.S. House of Representatives
Preceded by Robert L. F. Sikes	Member of the U.S. House of Representatives from Florida's 3rd congressional district 1963–1967	Succeeded by Charles Bennett
Preceded by Edward J. Gurney	Member of the U.S. House of Representatives from Florida's 11th congressional district 1967–1973	Succeeded by Paul G. Rogers
New constituency	Member of the U.S. House of Representatives from Florida's 14th congressional district 1973–1983	Succeeded by Daniel A. Mica
Preceded by William J. Randall	Chair of the House Aging Committee; 1977–1983	Succeeded by Edward R. Roybal
New constituency	Member of the U.S. House of Representatives from Florida's 18th congressional district 1983–1989	Succeeded by Ileana Ros-Lehtinen
Preceded by Richard Bolling	Chair of the House Rules Committee; 1983–1989	Succeeded by Joe Moakley
Honorary titles
Preceded by Elmer Austin Benson	Most Senior Living U.S. senator Sitting or Former; March 13, 1985 – May 30, 1989	Succeeded by John Danaher
Preceded by Robert N. C. Nix Sr.	Oldest member of the U.S. House of Representatives; 1979–1989	Succeeded by Augustus Hawkins
Preceded by Unknown Soldier of the Vietnam Era (Michael Blassie)	Persons who have lain in state or honor in the United States Capitol rotunda 1989	Succeeded by Jacob Chestnut; John Gibson
