= 1940 Georgia gubernatorial election =

1940 Georgia Democratic gubernatorial primary
- September 11, 1940

410 county unit votes 206 unit votes needed to win
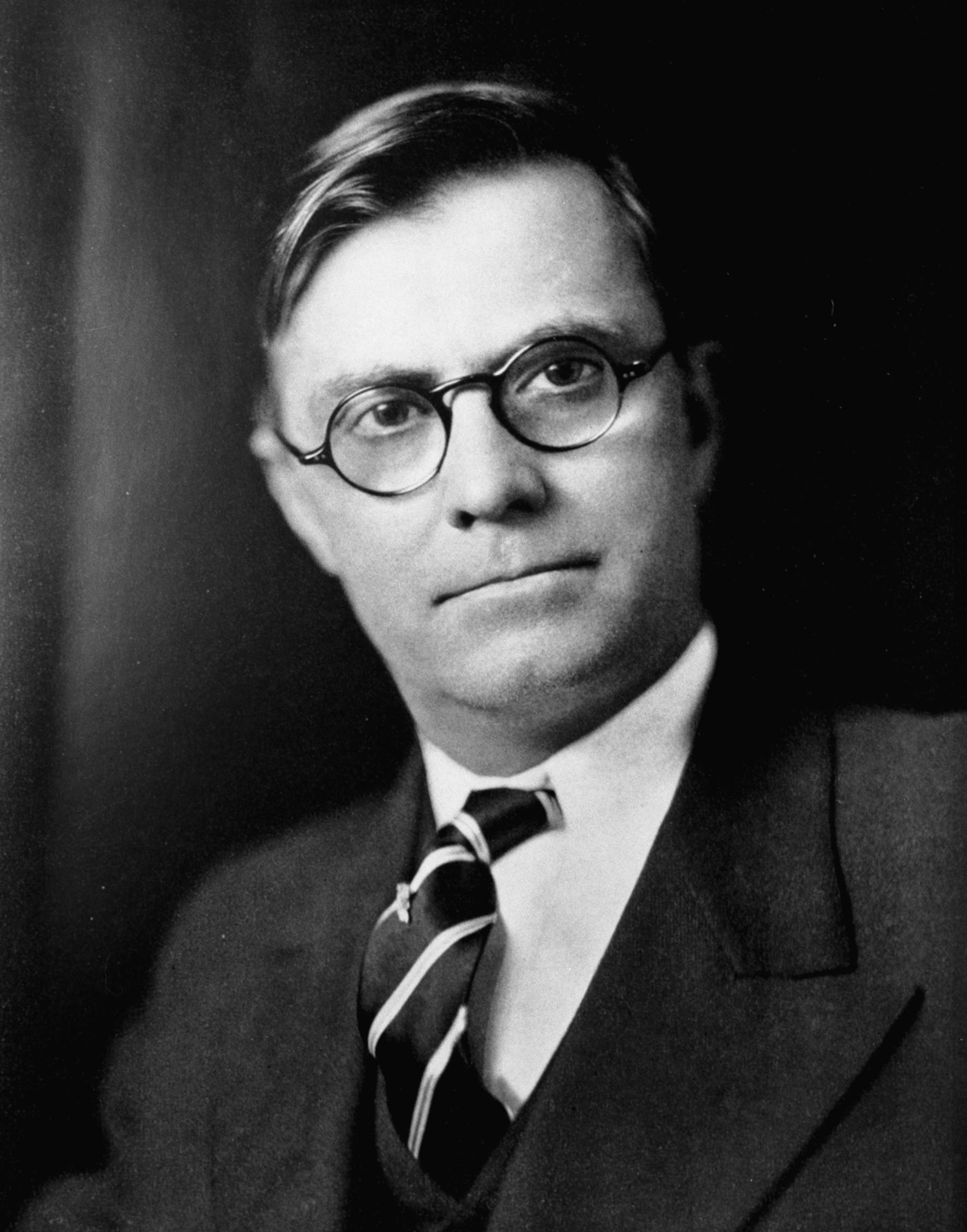

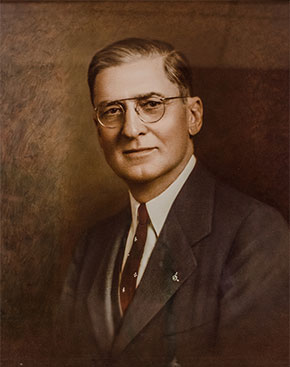

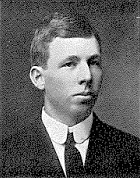
Nominee	Eugene Talmadge	Columbus Roberts	Hosea Abit Nix
Party	Democratic	Democratic	Democratic
Electoral vote	318	80	12
Popular vote	183,133	127,653	44,282
Percentage	51.58%	35.95%	12.47%
- County results Talmadge: 30–40% 40–50% 50–60% 60–70% 70–80% 80–90% >90% Roberts: 40–50% 50–60% Nix: 40–50% 60–70% 70–80%
Governor before election
Eurith D. Rivers
Democratic
Elected Governor
Eugene Talmadge
Democratic

The 1940 Georgia gubernatorial election took place in the US state on November 5, 1940, in order to elect the governor of Georgia.

Incumbent Democratic governor Eurith D. Rivers was term-limited, and ineligible to run for a third term until spending four years out of office (thus in 1944).

As was common at the time, the Democratic candidate ran with only token opposition in the general election so therefore the Democratic primary was the real contest, and winning the primary was considered tantamount to election.

== Democratic primary ==
The Democratic primary election was held on September 11, 1940. As Talmadge won a majority of county unit votes, there was no run-off.

=== County unit system ===
From 1917 until 1962, the Democratic Party in the U.S. state of Georgia used a voting system called the county unit system to determine victors in statewide primary elections.

The system was ostensibly designed to function similarly to the Electoral College, but in practice the large ratio of unit votes for small, rural counties to unit votes for more populous urban areas provided outsized political influence to the smaller counties.

Under the county unit system, the 159 counties in Georgia were divided by population into three categories. The largest eight counties were classified as "Urban", the next-largest 30 counties were classified as "Town", and the remaining 121 counties were classified as "Rural". Urban counties were given 6 unit votes, Town counties were given 4 unit votes, and Rural counties were given 2 unit votes, for a total of 410 available unit votes. Each county's unit votes were awarded on a winner-take-all basis.

Candidates were required to obtain a majority of unit votes (not necessarily a majority of the popular vote), or 206 total unit votes, to win the election. If no candidate received a majority in the initial primary, a runoff election was held between the top two candidates to determine a winner.

=== Candidates ===
- Hosea Abit Nix, attorney and unsuccessful candidate for Democratic nomination for governor in 1932
- Columbus Roberts, businessman
- Eugene Talmadge, former governor

=== Results ===
Candidate	Popular vote		County unit vote	
Candidate	Votes	%	Votes	%
Eugene Talmadge	183,133	51.58	318	77.56
Columbus Roberts	127,653	35.95	80	19.51
Hosea Abit Nix	44,282	12.47	12	2.93
Total	355,068	100.00	410	100.00

== General election ==
In the general election, Talmadge faced token opposition.

=== Results ===
1940 Georgia gubernatorial election
Party	Candidate	Votes	%	±%
Democratic	Eugene Talmadge	267,574	91.94%	
Independent Democrat	Eugene Talmadge	22,303	7.66%	
Total	Eugene Talmadge	289,877	99.60%	
Prohibition	J. L. R. Boyd	875	0.30%	
Independent	Joseph M. Wallace	296	0.10%	
Turnout		291,048	100.00%	
Democratic hold		Swing		

== Bibliography ==
- Gubernatorial Elections, 1787-1997. Washington, D.C.: Congressional Quarterly Inc. 1998. ISBN 1-56802-396-0.
- Glashan, Roy R. (1979). American Governors and Gubernatorial Elections, 1775-1978. Meckler Books. ISBN 0-930466-17-9.
- Compiled by Mrs. J.E. Hays, State Historian and Director (1943). Georgia's Official Register, 1939-1941-1943 (PDF). Atlanta, GA: State of Georgia, Department of Archives and History.
