= 1940 Wisconsin lieutenant gubernatorial election =

- November 5, 1940
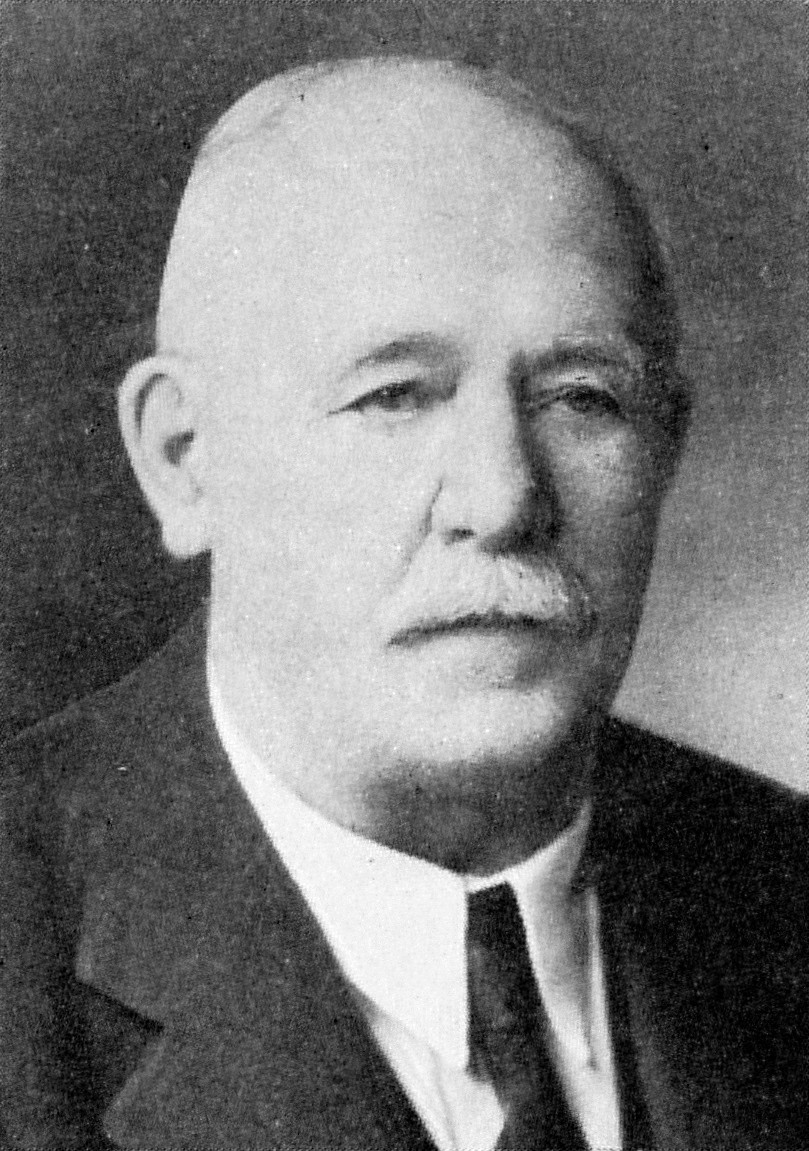

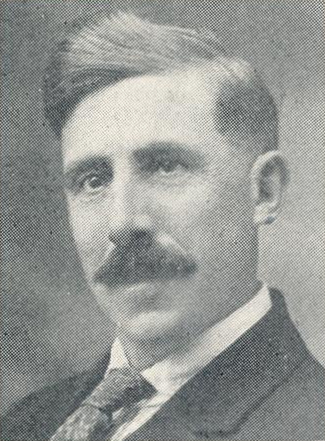

Nominee	Walter Samuel Goodland	Anton M. Miller	Morley Garfield Kelly
Party	Republican	Progressive	Democratic
Popular vote	575,983	411,055	274,016
Percentage	45.57%	32.52%	21.68%
- County results Goodland: 30–40% 40–50% 50–60% 60–70% 70–80% Miller: 40–50% 50–60% 60–70% Kelly: 40–50% 50–60%
Lieutenant Governor before election
Walter Samuel Goodland
Republican
Elected Lieutenant Governor
Walter Samuel Goodland
Republican

The 1940 Wisconsin lieutenant gubernatorial election was held on November 5, 1940, in order to elect the lieutenant governor of Wisconsin. Incumbent Republican lieutenant governor Walter Samuel Goodland defeated Progressive nominee and former member of the Wisconsin Senate Anton M. Miller and Democratic nominee and fellow former member of the Wisconsin Senate Morley Garfield Kelly.

== General election ==
On election day, November 5, 1940, incumbent Republican lieutenant governor Walter Samuel Goodland won re-election by a margin of 164,928 votes against his foremost opponent Progressive nominee Anton M. Miller, thereby retaining Republican control over the office of lieutenant governor. Goodland was sworn in for his second term on January 6, 1941.

=== Results ===
Wisconsin lieutenant gubernatorial election, 1940
Party	Candidate	Votes	%
Republican	Walter Samuel Goodland (incumbent)	575,983	45.57
Progressive	Anton M. Miller	411,055	32.52
Democratic	Morley Garfield Kelly	274,016	21.68
	Scattering	2,973	0.23
Total votes		1,264,027	100.00
Republican hold			
