= 1944 Guatemalan parliamentary election =

Parliamentary elections were held in Guatemala on 3–5 November 1944 to elect members of the Congress. The result was a victory for the United Front of Political Parties and Civic Associations (FUPP), which won all 76 seats. The FUPP was an alliance of the National Democratic Front, the Popular Liberation Front, the Central Democratic Party, the Social Democratic Party, the National Renovation Party and the National Vanguard Party.

== Results ==
Party	Seats
United Front of Political Parties and Civic Associations	76
Total	76

== Bibliography ==
- Villagrán Kramer, Francisco. Biografía política de Guatemala: años de guerra y años de paz. FLACSO-Guatemala, 2004.
- Political handbook of the world 1945. New York, 1946.
- Elections in the Americas A Data Handbook Volume 1. North America, Central America, and the Caribbean. Edited by Dieter Nohlen. 2005.
- Gleijeses, Piero. 1991. Shattered hope. The Guatemalan Revolution and the United States, 1944–1954. Princeton: Princeton University Press.
- Rodríguez de Ita, Guadalupe. 2003. La participación política en la primavera guatemalteca: una aproximación a la historia de los partidos durante el periodo 1944–1954. México: Universidad Autónoma del Estado de México, Universidad Nacional Autónoma de México.
