= 1940 United States presidential election in Tennessee =

- November 5, 1940

All 11 Tennessee votes to the Electoral College

Nominee	Franklin D. Roosevelt	Wendell Willkie
Party	Democratic	Republican
Home state	New York	New York
Running mate	Henry A. Wallace	Charles L. McNary
Electoral vote	11	0
Popular vote	351,601	169,153
Percentage	67.25%	32.35%
County results
Roosevelt
50–60%
60–70%
70–80%
80–90%
90–100%
Willkie
40–50%
50–60%
60–70%
70–80%
80–90%
President before election
Franklin D. Roosevelt
Democratic
Elected President
Franklin D. Roosevelt
Democratic

The 1940 United States presidential election in Tennessee took place on November 5, 1940, as part of the 1940 United States presidential election. Tennessee voters chose 11 representatives, or electors, to the Electoral College, who voted for president and vice president.

For over a century after the Civil War, Tennessee was divided according to political loyalties established in that war. Unionist regions covering almost all of East Tennessee, Kentucky Pennyroyal-allied Macon County, and the five West Tennessee Highland Rim counties of Carroll, Henderson, McNairy, Hardin and Wayne voted Republican – generally by landslide margins – as they saw the Democratic Party as the "war party" who had forced them into a war they did not wish to fight. Contrariwise, the rest of Middle and West Tennessee who had supported and driven the state's secession was equally fiercely Democratic as it associated the Republicans with Reconstruction. After the disfranchisement of the state's African-American population by a poll tax was largely complete in the 1890s, the Democratic Party was certain of winning statewide elections if united, although unlike the Deep South Republicans would almost always gain thirty to forty percent of the statewide vote from mountain and Highland Rim support.

In 1920 by moving into a small number of traditionally Democratic areas in Middle Tennessee and expanding turnout due to the Nineteenth Amendment and powerful isolationist sentiment, the Republican Party captured Tennessee's presidential electoral votes and won the governorship and three congressional seats in addition to the rock-ribbed GOP First and Second Districts. In 1922 and 1924, with the ebbing of isolationist sympathy and a consequent decline in turnout, the Democratic Party regained Tennessee's governorship and presidential electoral votes; however, in 1928 anti-Catholicism against Democratic nominee Al Smith in this powerfully fundamentalist state meant that Herbert Hoover bettered Harding's performance without however gaining the down-ballot coattails of 1920.

These Republican gains would be completely reversed in the 1930s due to the impact of the Great Depression, which was generally blamed upon the Republican Party's policies during the 1920s. Internal divisions prevented the Republicans taking advantage of a disputed Democratic gubernatorial primary in 1932 between Lewis Pope and Hill McAlister, and for the next third of a century the Republicans would rarely contest statewide offices seriously despite their continuing dominance of East Tennessee and half a dozen Unionist counties in the middle and west of the state. Statewide politics for the decade and a half after the beginning of the Depression would be dominated by Edward Hull “Boss” Crump, whose Memphis political machine would consistently provide decisive votes in statewide Democratic primaries — aided by cross-party voting by Republicans in eastern mountain counties. Crump would be supported during this era by long-serving Senator Kenneth Douglas McKellar, and in 1938 when several statewide candidates allied themselves with Tennessee's other Senator, Gordon Browning, the Crump/McKellar machine not merely defeated the collaboration, but even unseated Senator Browning.

Incumbent President Franklin D. Roosevelt, who was now running with Secretary of Agriculture Henry A. Wallace in place of incumbent Vice President John Nance Garner, would visit Tennessee at the beginning of September. In his visit he defended his accomplishment as Assistant Secretary of the Navy in the Wilson administration, and the work of the Tennessee Valley Authority which the New Deal had created. Republican nominee Wendell Willkie and running mate Minority Leader and Oregon senior Senator Charles L. McNary did not comment or visit the state. A Gallup poll in mid-October showed Roosevelt maintaining his 1936 68 percent vote percentage, and in the end Roosevelt carried Tennessee with 67.25 percent of the popular vote to 32.35 percent for Willkie.

== Results ==
1940 United States presidential election in Tennessee
Party	Candidate	Votes	%
Democratic	Franklin D. Roosevelt (inc.)	351,601	67.25%
Republican	Wendell Willkie	169,153	32.35%
Prohibition	Roger Babson	1,606	0.31%
Socialist	Norman Thomas	463	0.09%
Total votes		522,823	100%

=== Results by county ===
1940 United States presidential election in Tennessee by county
County	Franklin D. Roosevelt Democratic		Wendell Willkie Republican		Roger W. Babson Prohibition		Norman Thomas Socialist		Margin		Total votes cast
County	#	%	#	%	#	%	#	%	#	%	Total votes cast
Anderson	2,218	54.22%	1,852	45.27%	12	0.29%	9	0.22%	366	8.95%	4,091
Bedford	2,499	81.29%	555	18.05%	20	0.65%	0	0.00%	1,944	63.24%	3,074
Benton	1,996	69.38%	858	29.82%	14	0.49%	9	0.31%	1,138	39.56%	2,877
Bledsoe	1,527	53.69%	1,317	46.31%	0	0.00%	0	0.00%	210	7.38%	2,844
Blount	3,363	43.56%	4,312	55.85%	45	0.58%	0	0.00%	-949	-12.29%	7,720
Bradley	1,976	42.82%	2,617	56.71%	19	0.41%	3	0.07%	-641	-13.89%	4,615
Campbell	2,688	48.77%	2,799	50.78%	25	0.45%	0	0.00%	-111	-2.01%	5,512
Cannon	1,699	72.05%	638	27.06%	16	0.68%	5	0.21%	1,061	45.00%	2,358
Carroll	2,830	50.16%	2,782	49.31%	30	0.53%	0	0.00%	48	0.85%	5,642
Carter	2,171	33.50%	4,238	65.40%	50	0.77%	21	0.32%	-2,067	-31.90%	6,480
Cheatham	1,932	85.26%	331	14.61%	1	0.04%	2	0.09%	1,601	70.65%	2,266
Chester	1,537	60.23%	1,015	39.77%	0	0.00%	0	0.00%	522	20.45%	2,552
Claiborne	2,792	48.44%	2,879	49.95%	61	1.06%	32	0.56%	-87	-1.51%	5,764
Clay	1,288	70.58%	537	29.42%	0	0.00%	0	0.00%	751	41.15%	1,825
Cocke	1,098	23.50%	3,521	75.35%	32	0.68%	22	0.47%	-2,423	-51.85%	4,673
Coffee	2,277	83.96%	424	15.63%	10	0.37%	1	0.04%	1,853	68.33%	2,712
Crockett	2,048	73.41%	733	26.27%	6	0.22%	3	0.11%	1,315	47.13%	2,790
Cumberland	1,443	48.67%	1,492	50.32%	16	0.54%	14	0.47%	-49	-1.65%	2,965
Davidson	27,589	75.89%	8,763	24.11%	0	0.00%	0	0.00%	18,826	51.79%	36,352
Decatur	1,832	58.77%	1,275	40.90%	7	0.22%	3	0.10%	557	17.87%	3,117
DeKalb	2,830	58.10%	2,041	41.90%	0	0.00%	0	0.00%	789	16.20%	4,871
Dickson	2,784	83.88%	527	15.88%	6	0.18%	2	0.06%	2,257	68.00%	3,319
Dyer	3,374	77.03%	961	21.94%	33	0.75%	12	0.27%	2,413	55.09%	4,380
Fayette	1,826	95.80%	78	4.09%	2	0.10%	0	0.00%	1,748	91.71%	1,906
Fentress	919	39.66%	1,365	58.91%	10	0.43%	23	0.99%	-446	-19.25%	2,317
Franklin	4,312	88.13%	569	11.63%	9	0.18%	3	0.06%	3,743	76.50%	4,893
Gibson	5,103	80.29%	1,233	19.40%	17	0.27%	3	0.05%	3,870	60.89%	6,356
Giles	3,796	84.34%	692	15.37%	13	0.29%	0	0.00%	3,104	68.96%	4,501
Grainger	842	32.93%	1,688	66.01%	27	1.06%	0	0.00%	-846	-33.09%	2,557
Greene	4,406	48.23%	4,587	50.21%	109	1.19%	33	0.36%	-181	-1.98%	9,135
Grundy	1,749	85.07%	298	14.49%	7	0.34%	2	0.10%	1,451	70.57%	2,056
Hamblen	2,055	53.00%	1,794	46.27%	28	0.72%	0	0.00%	261	6.73%	3,877
Hamilton	17,083	63.45%	9,771	36.29%	41	0.15%	27	0.10%	7,312	27.16%	26,922
Hancock	1,014	37.54%	1,673	61.94%	14	0.52%	0	0.00%	-659	-24.40%	2,701
Hardeman	2,549	88.66%	319	11.10%	7	0.24%	0	0.00%	2,230	77.57%	2,875
Hardin	1,957	46.08%	2,264	53.31%	26	0.61%	0	0.00%	-307	-7.23%	4,247
Hawkins	2,108	38.62%	3,314	60.72%	36	0.66%	0	0.00%	-1,206	-22.10%	5,458
Haywood	3,466	96.33%	128	3.56%	4	0.11%	0	0.00%	3,338	92.77%	3,598
Henderson	1,560	36.95%	2,653	62.84%	2	0.05%	7	0.17%	-1,093	-25.89%	4,222
Henry	3,307	85.10%	563	14.49%	13	0.33%	3	0.08%	2,744	70.61%	3,886
Hickman	2,776	80.84%	644	18.75%	14	0.41%	0	0.00%	2,132	62.09%	3,434
Houston	1,093	82.12%	229	17.21%	9	0.68%	0	0.00%	864	64.91%	1,331
Humphreys	1,717	81.88%	377	17.98%	3	0.14%	0	0.00%	1,340	63.90%	2,097
Jackson	2,046	76.92%	605	22.74%	9	0.34%	0	0.00%	1,441	54.17%	2,660
Jefferson	1,062	35.35%	1,921	63.95%	16	0.53%	5	0.17%	-859	-28.60%	3,004
Johnson	469	15.79%	2,502	84.21%	0	0.00%	0	0.00%	-2,033	-68.43%	2,971
Knox	20,226	58.96%	13,877	40.45%	134	0.39%	67	0.20%	6,349	18.51%	34,304
Lake	2,962	92.94%	213	6.68%	2	0.06%	10	0.31%	2,749	86.26%	3,187
Lauderdale	6,279	95.09%	317	4.80%	7	0.11%	0	0.00%	5,962	90.29%	6,603
Lawrence	3,936	67.44%	1,877	32.16%	19	0.33%	4	0.07%	2,059	35.28%	5,836
Lewis	1,343	78.26%	368	21.45%	2	0.12%	3	0.17%	975	56.82%	1,716
Lincoln	3,781	87.62%	521	12.07%	13	0.30%	0	0.00%	3,260	75.55%	4,315
Loudon	2,068	47.90%	2,226	51.56%	16	0.37%	7	0.16%	-158	-3.66%	4,317
Macon	711	29.08%	1,730	70.76%	4	0.16%	0	0.00%	-1,019	-41.68%	2,445
Madison	6,154	82.63%	1,271	17.06%	19	0.26%	4	0.05%	4,883	65.56%	7,448
Marion	3,242	59.65%	2,158	39.71%	35	0.64%	0	0.00%	1,084	19.94%	5,435
Marshall	3,132	88.90%	389	11.04%	2	0.06%	0	0.00%	2,743	77.86%	3,523
Maury	4,529	87.33%	634	12.23%	20	0.39%	3	0.06%	3,895	75.11%	5,186
McMinn	5,192	56.92%	3,901	42.77%	19	0.21%	9	0.10%	1,291	14.15%	9,121
McNairy	2,484	49.34%	2,550	50.66%	0	0.00%	0	0.00%	-66	-1.31%	5,034
Meigs	889	60.81%	573	39.19%	0	0.00%	0	0.00%	316	21.61%	1,462
Monroe	4,121	55.57%	3,253	43.86%	42	0.57%	0	0.00%	868	11.70%	7,416
Montgomery	3,158	79.15%	819	20.53%	11	0.28%	2	0.05%	2,339	58.62%	3,990
Moore	869	88.49%	106	10.79%	6	0.61%	1	0.10%	763	77.70%	982
Morgan	1,783	55.18%	1,448	44.82%	0	0.00%	0	0.00%	335	10.37%	3,231
Obion	4,360	88.73%	536	10.91%	14	0.28%	4	0.08%	3,824	77.82%	4,914
Overton	1,718	62.86%	988	36.15%	11	0.40%	16	0.59%	730	26.71%	2,733
Perry	1,068	76.12%	332	23.66%	3	0.21%	0	0.00%	736	52.46%	1,403
Pickett	652	43.70%	830	55.63%	8	0.54%	2	0.13%	-178	-11.93%	1,492
Polk	3,611	86.53%	562	13.47%	0	0.00%	0	0.00%	3,049	73.06%	4,173
Putnam	2,963	65.21%	1,576	34.68%	3	0.07%	2	0.04%	1,387	30.52%	4,544
Rhea	2,364	54.52%	1,956	45.11%	16	0.37%	0	0.00%	408	9.41%	4,336
Roane	2,384	51.27%	2,245	48.28%	19	0.41%	2	0.04%	139	2.99%	4,650
Robertson	3,258	86.49%	490	13.01%	18	0.48%	1	0.03%	2,768	73.48%	3,767
Rutherford	4,207	83.99%	782	15.61%	20	0.40%	0	0.00%	3,425	68.38%	5,009
Scott	1,448	39.68%	2,187	59.93%	14	0.38%	0	0.00%	-739	-20.25%	3,649
Sequatchie	1,003	71.24%	401	28.48%	4	0.28%	0	0.00%	602	42.76%	1,408
Sevier	1,181	20.54%	4,569	79.46%	0	0.00%	0	0.00%	-3,388	-58.92%	5,750
Shelby	57,664	88.61%	7,312	11.24%	55	0.08%	43	0.07%	50,352	77.38%	65,074
Smith	2,244	77.22%	648	22.30%	8	0.28%	6	0.21%	1,596	54.92%	2,906
Stewart	2,699	87.40%	374	12.11%	14	0.45%	1	0.03%	2,325	75.29%	3,088
Sullivan	7,234	63.34%	4,153	36.36%	34	0.30%	0	0.00%	3,081	26.98%	11,421
Sumner	3,591	80.75%	834	18.75%	17	0.38%	5	0.11%	2,757	62.00%	4,447
Tipton	5,815	95.13%	288	4.71%	9	0.15%	1	0.02%	5,527	90.41%	6,113
Trousdale	929	90.63%	94	9.17%	2	0.20%	0	0.00%	835	81.46%	1,025
Unicoi	985	34.19%	1,863	64.67%	29	1.01%	4	0.14%	-878	-30.48%	2,881
Union	673	36.90%	1,143	62.66%	8	0.44%	0	0.00%	-470	-25.77%	1,824
Van Buren	732	69.52%	318	30.20%	3	0.28%	0	0.00%	414	39.32%	1,053
Warren	2,323	80.46%	546	18.91%	18	0.62%	0	0.00%	1,777	61.55%	2,887
Washington	3,565	42.81%	4,719	56.67%	43	0.52%	0	0.00%	-1,154	-13.86%	8,327
Wayne	1,100	30.62%	2,486	69.21%	6	0.17%	0	0.00%	-1,386	-38.59%	3,592
Weakley	3,474	74.74%	1,139	24.51%	26	0.56%	9	0.19%	2,335	50.24%	4,648
White	2,256	77.05%	657	22.44%	15	0.51%	0	0.00%	1,599	54.61%	2,928
Williamson	3,215	85.82%	505	13.48%	26	0.69%	0	0.00%	2,710	72.34%	3,746
Wilson	3,020	82.04%	655	17.79%	6	0.16%	0	0.00%	2,365	64.25%	3,681
Totals	351,601	67.25%	169,153	32.35%	1,606	0.31%	463	0.09%	182,448	34.90%	522,823

==== Counties that flipped from Democratic to Republican ====
- Bradley
- Claiborne
- Cumberland
- Greene
- Hardin
- McNairy

==== Counties that flipped from Republican to Democratic ====
- McMinn
- Roane

== Analysis ==
Roosevelt's 67.25 percent vote share was slightly below what he managed in 1936, but slightly greater than what he gained in Tennessee in 1932. Nationally Willkie won eight states and almost 700 counties that had supported Roosevelt four years earlier, mostly because of Midwestern German-American opposition to increasing "tension" with Nazi Germany. However, in heavily Anglophile Tennessee, support for aid to the United Kingdom in World War II turned substantial numbers of normally rock-ribbed GOP voters to Roosevelt. Although FDR lost five normally Republican counties which he had carried in 1936 in Bradley, Claiborne, Cumberland, Greene and Hardin, he won two counties that had backed Hoover and Landon in his first two runs. FDR was the first Democrat to ever carry Roane County.

As of the 2024 presidential election, this is the last occasion when Knox County has voted for a Democratic presidential candidate.

== See also ==
- 1940 United States Senate election in Tennessee
- 1940 Tennessee gubernatorial election
