= Louis J. Michot =

American politician

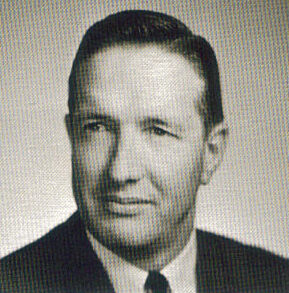
- Michot in 1969

Member of the Louisiana House of Representatives
- In office 1960–1964

Member of the Louisiana State Board of Education
- In office 1968–1972

Personal details
- Born: Louis Joseph Michot Jr. November 5, 1922 Lafayette, Louisiana, U.S.
- Died: March 6, 2012 (aged 89) Lafayette, Louisiana, U.S.
- Party: Democratic

Louis Joseph Michot Jr. (November 5, 1922 – March 6, 2012) was an American politician. A member of the Democratic Party, he served in the Louisiana House of Representatives from 1960 to 1964 and in the Louisiana State Board of Education from 1968 to 1972.

== Life and career ==
Michot was born in Lafayette, Louisiana, the son of Louis Joseph Michot Sr. and Adele Marie Domas. He attended Cathedral High School, graduating in 1939. After graduating, he attended the University of Louisiana at Lafayette, but his education was interrupted when he enlisted in the United States Marine Corps during World War II.

Michot served in the Louisiana House of Representatives from 1960 to 1964. After his service in the House, in 1964, he ran as a Democratic candidate for governor of Louisiana. He received 37,463 votes, but lost in the Democratic primary election to candidate deLesseps Story Morrison, which after losing in the gubernatorial election, he served in the Louisiana State Board of Education from 1968 to 1972.

== Death ==
Michot died on March 6, 2012, in Lafayette, Louisiana, at the age of 89.
