= 1940 Connecticut lieutenant gubernatorial election =

- November 5, 1940

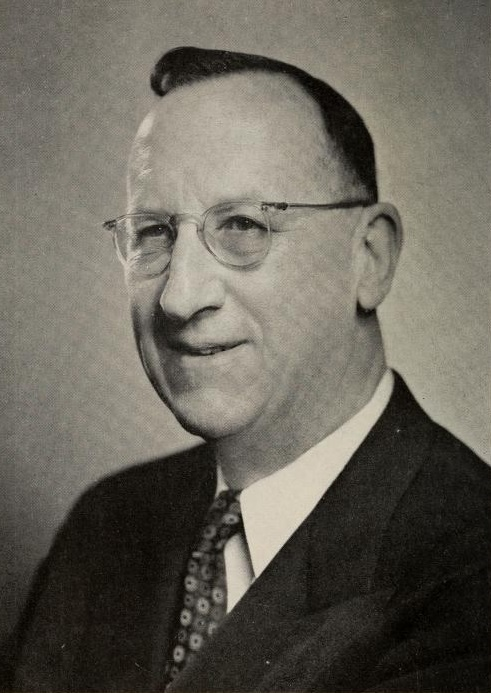
Nominee	Odell Shepard	James L. McConaughy
Party	Democratic	Republican
Popular vote	406,834	365,059
Percentage	52.70%	47.30%
Lieutenant Governor before election
James L. McConaughy
Republican
Elected Lieutenant Governor
Odell Shepard
Democratic

The 1940 Connecticut lieutenant gubernatorial election was held on November 5, 1940, to elect the lieutenant governor of Connecticut. Democratic nominee Odell Shepard won the election against incumbent Republican lieutenant governor James L. McConaughy.

== General election ==
On election day, November 5, 1940, Democratic nominee Odell Shepard won the election with 52.70% of the vote, thereby gaining Democratic control over the office of lieutenant governor. Shepard was sworn in as the 86th lieutenant governor of Connecticut on January 8, 1941.

=== Results ===
Connecticut lieutenant gubernatorial election, 1940
Party	Candidate	Votes	%
Democratic	Odell Shepard	406,834	52.70
Republican	James L. McConaughy (incumbent)	365,059	47.30
Total votes		771,893	100.00
Democratic gain from Republican			
