= 1944 United States Senate election in Florida =

- November 7, 1944
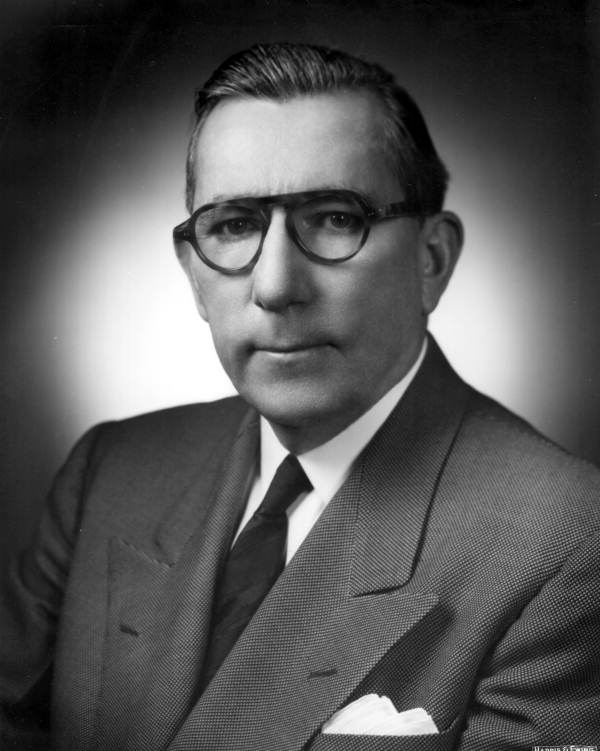

| Nominee | Claude Pepper | Miles H. Draper |
| Party | Democratic | Republican |
| Popular vote | 335,685 | 135,258 |
| Percentage | 71.28% | 28.72% |
- County results Pepper: 50–60% 60–70% 70–80% 80–90% >90%
Senator before election
Claude Pepper
Democratic
Elected Senator
Claude Pepper
Democratic

The 1944 United States Senate election in Florida was held on November 7, 1944. Incumbent Senator Claude Pepper easily won re-election to a second full term.

Primary elections were held on May 2, 1944.

== Democratic Primary ==
Democratic primary results
| Party | Candidate | Votes | % |
|---|---|---|---|
| Democratic | Claude Pepper (incumbent) | 194,445 | 51.27 |
| Democratic | J. Ollie Edmunds | 127,158 | 33.53 |
| Democratic | Millard B. Conklin | 33,317 | 8.78 |
| Democratic | Finley Moore | 14,815 | 3.91 |
| Democratic | Alston Cockrell | 9,551 | 2.52 |
| Total votes | | 379,286 | 100 |

== Republican Primary ==
Republican primary results
| Party | Candidate | Votes | % |
|---|---|---|---|
| Republican | Miles H. Draper | 5,289 | 53.33% |
| Republican | Henry K. Gibson | 4,628 | 46.67% |
| Total votes | | 9,917 | 100 |

== General Election ==
General Election results
| Party | Candidate | Votes | % |
|---|---|---|---|
| Democratic | Claude Pepper (Incumbent) | 335,685 | 71.28% |
| Republican | Miles H. Draper | 135,258 | 28.72% |
| Majority | | 200,427 | 42.56% |
| Turnout | | 470,943 | |
| Democratic hold | | | |
