= United States House Permanent Select Committee on Aging =

United States House committee on aging

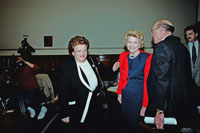
Ohio Congresswoman Mary Rose Oakar greets former First Lady Betty Ford before she testifies before the Select Committee on Aging in March 1991.

The United States House Permanent Select Committee on Aging was a permanent select committee of the United States House of Representatives between 1974 and 1992.

The committee was created with the intent not of forming legislation directly, but of conducting investigations and holding hearings. In such a manner it would spur legislation and other action via regular committee channels. The action to approve the committee was passed on October 8, 1974, by a 299–44 margin in the House.

The committee became operational in June 1975 and initially had 35 members. Its first chair was Missouri's William J. Randall. The committee soon grew to 65 members. Florida's Claude Pepper, a powerful and influential member of Congress known for his commitment to representing the elderly, became chair in 1977 following Randall's retirement. In his late seventies and early eighties while chairing the committee, Pepper was renowned for his fast-paced presence in Congress; he used himself and the committee to focus attention against the problem of age stereotyping. The committee soon grew to 65 members. In 1983, Pepper stepped aside and Edward R. Roybal of California became chair.

During his tenure in Congress, Representative Mario Biaggi was Chairman of the US House Permanent Select Committee on Aging Subcommittee on Human Services.

The committee conducted research and held public hearings into the issues affecting older Americans. Hearings were given titles, such as 1983's "Endless Night, Endless Mourning: Living with Alzheimer's". In particular, the committee held hearings and published a number of reports on elder abuse, including Elder Abuse: An Examination of a Hidden Problem, Elder Abuse: A National Disgrace, and Elder Abuse: A Decade of Shame and Inaction.

The committee's work led to the passage of reform legislation intended to reform nursing home operations and reducing abuse against their patients. Also resulting were increased home care benefits for the aging as well as legislation establishing research and care centers for Alzheimer's disease.

The committee's work came to an end on October 9, 1992, at the conclusion of the 102nd Congress. It was not renewed during the 103rd Congress, as the House was under pressure to reduce its internal costs and to streamline the legislative process.

== See also ==
- United States Senate Special Committee on Aging
