= United Front of Political Parties and Civic Associations =

United Front of Political Parties and Civic Associations (Frente Unido de Partidos Políticos y Asociaciones Cívicas, FUPP) was a political electoral front in Guatemala. The principal partners in the front were the National Democratic Front (FND), Popular Liberation Front (FPL), Central Democratic Party (PDC), Social Democratic Party (PSD), National Renovation Party (PRN) and the National Vanguard Party (PVN). The Front was formed on October 19, 1944. It disbanded after the Legislative elections of 1944 which was held from November 3-5.
