= 1944 Wisconsin lieutenant gubernatorial election =

- November 7, 1944
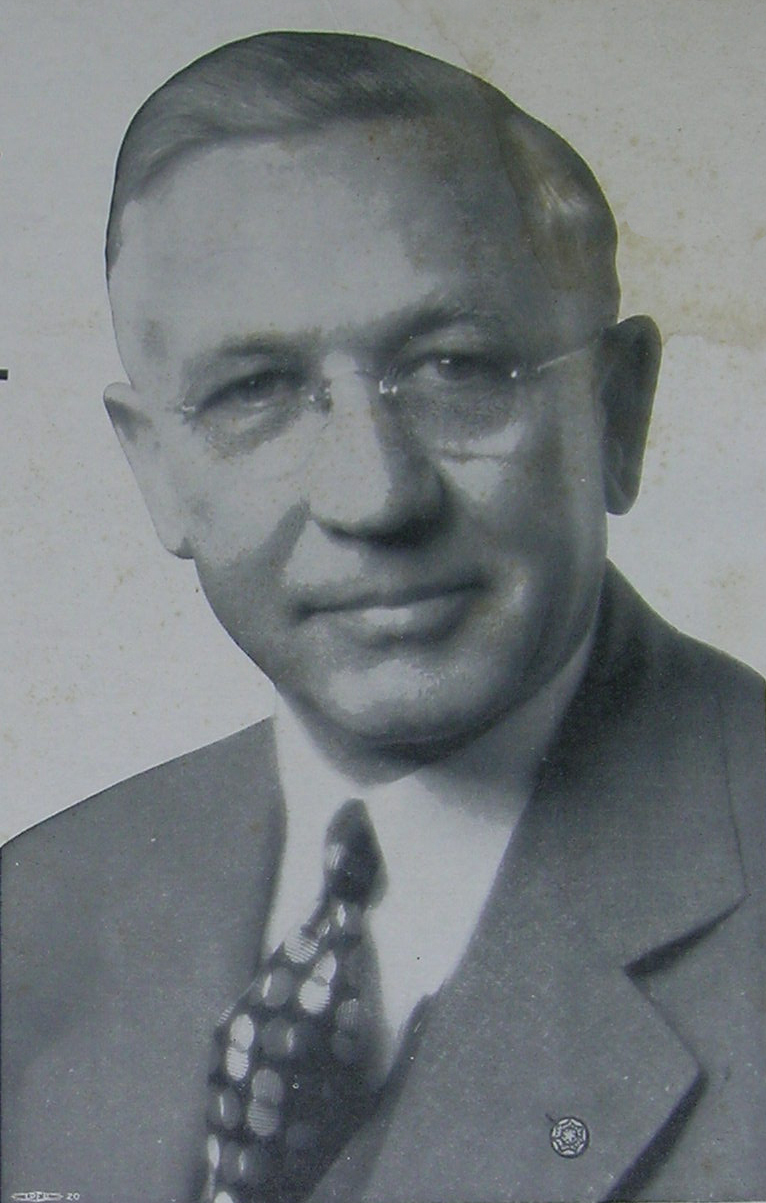

Nominee	Oscar Rennebohm	Marshall Whaling	Clough Gates
Party	Republican	Democratic	Progressive
Popular vote	672,462	477,554	79,068
Percentage	54.21%	38.50%	6.37%
- County results Rennebohm: 40–50% 50–60% 60–70% 70–80% 80–90% Whaling: 40–50% 50–60% 60–70% Gates: 30–40%
Lieutenant Governor before election
Walter Samuel Goodland
Republican
Elected Lieutenant Governor
Oscar Rennebohm
Republican

The 1944 Wisconsin lieutenant gubernatorial election was held on November 7, 1944, in order to elect the lieutenant governor of Wisconsin. Republican nominee Oscar Rennebohm defeated Democratic nominee Marshall Whaling, Progressive nominee Clough Gates and Social-Democratic nominee George E. Helberg.

== General election ==
On election day, November 7, 1944, Republican nominee Oscar Rennebohm won the election by a margin of 194,908 votes against his foremost opponent Democratic nominee Marshall Whaling, thereby retaining Republican control over the office of lieutenant governor. Rennebohm was sworn in as the 30th lieutenant governor of Wisconsin on January 1, 1945.

=== Results ===
Wisconsin lieutenant gubernatorial election, 1944
Party	Candidate	Votes	%
Republican	Oscar Rennebohm	672,462	54.21
Democratic	Marshall Whaling	477,554	38.50
Progressive	Clough Gates	79,068	6.37
Social-Democratic	George E. Helberg	11,167	0.90
	Scattering	134	0.02
Total votes		1,240,385	100.00
Republican hold			
