= Anton M. Miller =

American farmer and politician

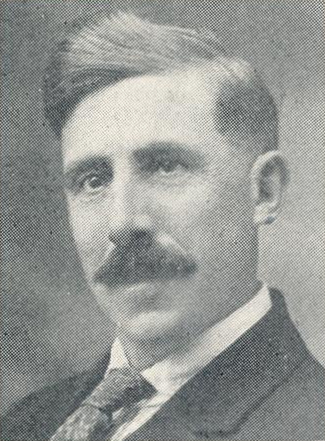
Miller c. 1925

Anton M. Miller (May 1, 1876 – September 19, 1954) was an American farmer and politician.

Born in Outagamie County, Wisconsin, Miller was a farmer and a member of the local and county American Society of Equity. He ran unsuccessfully for the Wisconsin State Assembly as a Social Democrat in 1910 and 1912, later was elected as a Republican (being thrice re-elected), and then served in the Wisconsin State Senate from 1929 to 1933. Later affiliated with the Wisconsin Progressive Party, Miller was an unsuccessful candidate for the Senate in 1936, the Assembly in 1938 and for Lieutenant Governor of Wisconsin in 1940. Miller also served on the board of regents of the University of Wisconsin for one six-year term. He lived in the town of Kaukauna.

== Notes ==
Party political offices
Preceded by George A. Nelson	Progressive nominee for Lieutenant Governor of Wisconsin; 1940	Succeeded by Henry J. Berquist
