= 1940 Texas lieutenant gubernatorial election =

- November 5, 1940
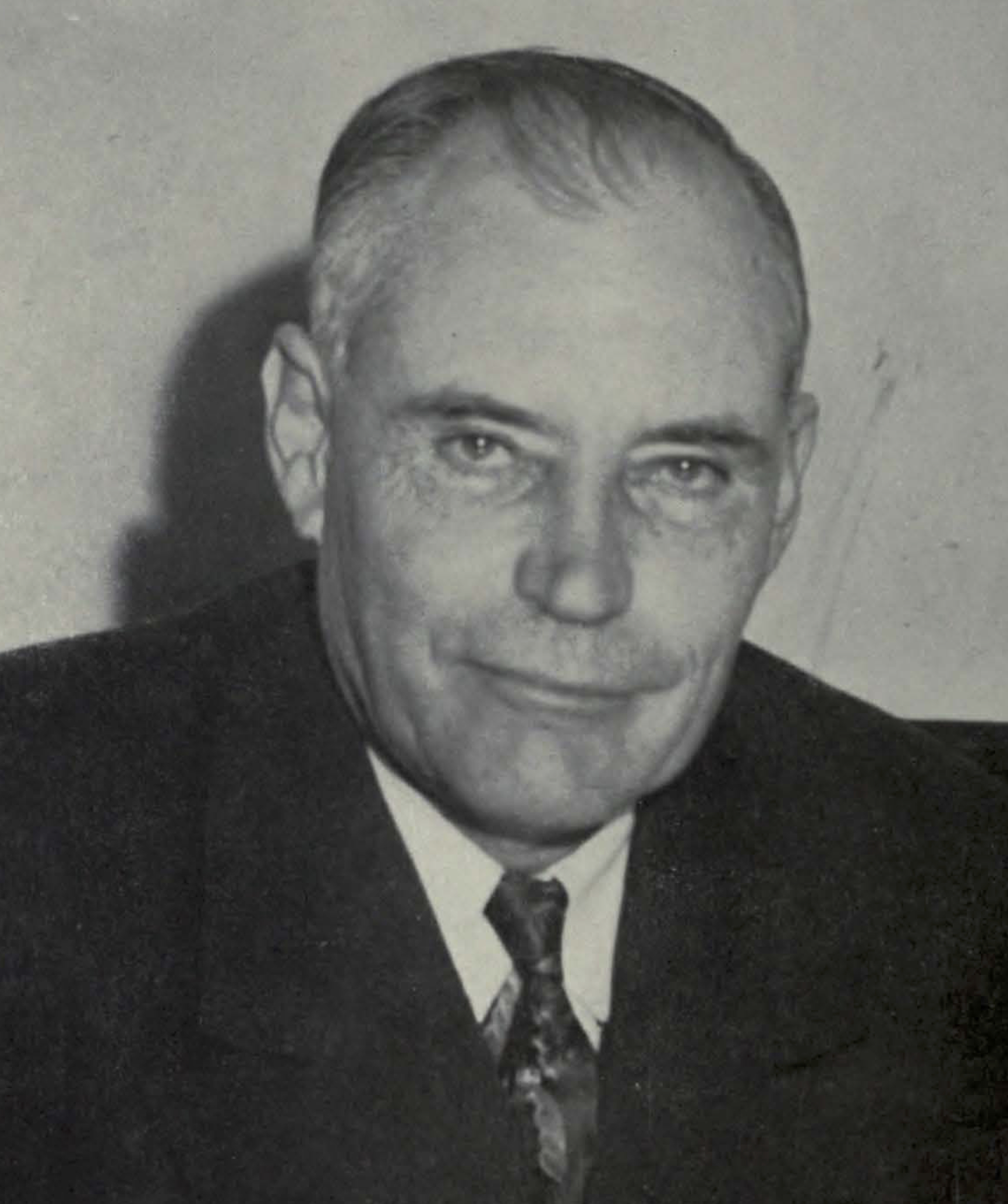

Nominee	Coke R. Stevenson	S. D. Bennett
Party	Democratic	Republican
Popular vote	1,023,184	55,860
Percentage	94.80%	5.18%
Lieutenant Governor before election
Coke R. Stevenson
Democratic
Elected Lieutenant Governor
Coke R. Stevenson
Democratic

The 1940 Texas lieutenant gubernatorial election was held on November 5, 1940, in order to elect the lieutenant governor of Texas. Incumbent Democratic lieutenant governor Coke R. Stevenson defeated Republican nominee S. D. Bennett.

== General election ==
On election day, November 5, 1940, incumbent Democratic lieutenant governor Coke R. Stevenson won re-election by a margin of 967,324 votes against his opponent Republican nominee S. D. Bennett, thereby retaining Democratic control over the office of lieutenant governor. Stevenson was sworn in for his second term on January 21, 1941.

=== Results ===
Texas lieutenant gubernatorial election, 1940
Party	Candidate	Votes	%
Democratic	Coke R. Stevenson (incumbent)	1,023,184	94.80
Republican	S. D. Bennett	55,860	5.18
	Scattering	297	0.02
Total votes		1,079,341	100.00
Democratic hold			
