= 1940 Afghan parliamentary election =

- 1940

All seats in the House of the People

Parliamentary elections were held in Afghanistan in 1940.

== Electoral system ==
The bicameral parliament consisted of a House of the People whose members were elected for three-year terms, and a House of the Notables whose members were appointed by the king.

Suffrage was granted to men aged over 20, while candidates were required to be literate and aged 25–70. Civil servants were not able to stand for election. In order to vote, voters were required to travel to provincial cities where a public discussion would take place on the candidates. The electoral law required candidates to be elected by "general consent", or if there was a lack of consensus, by plurality vote.

== Aftermath ==
Abdul Ahad Wardak remained speaker.
