= United Front of Arevalist Parties =

The United Front of Arevalist Parties (Spanish: Frente Unido de Partidos Arevalistas, FUPA) was a Guatemalan political electoral front. The principal partners in the front were Popular Liberation Front (FPL) and the National Renovation Party (PRN). The Front was formed in November 1944. It disbanded after the Presidential elections of December 1944.
