= Columbus Roberts =

American politician, farmer

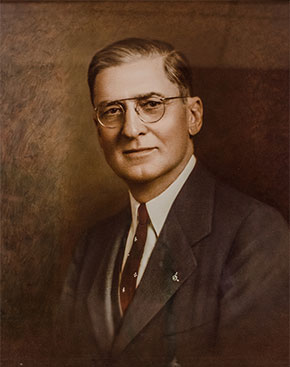
Columbus Roberts

Columbus Roberts was a Georgia businessman, farmer, and politician. A member of the Democratic Party, he was the Commissioner of the Georgia Department of Agriculture. He ran for Governor of Georgia in 1940, losing the primary to former Governor Eugene Talmadge.
