= 1944 Connecticut lieutenant gubernatorial election =

- November 7, 1944
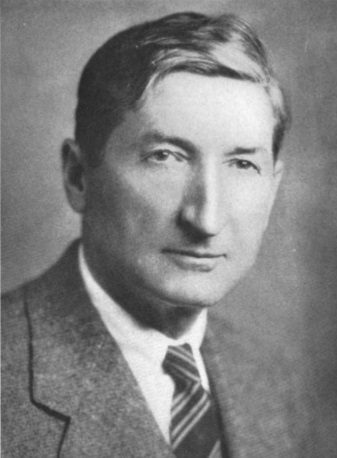

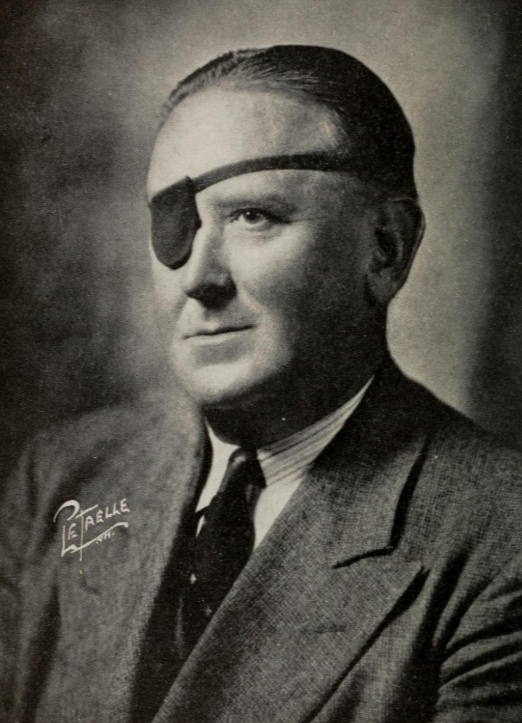
Nominee	Charles Wilbert Snow	William L. Hadden
Party	Democratic	Republican
Popular vote	418,720	401,078
Percentage	51.10%	48.90%
Lieutenant Governor before election
William L. Hadden
Republican
Elected Lieutenant Governor
Charles Wilbert Snow
Democratic

The 1944 Connecticut lieutenant gubernatorial election was held on November 7, 1944, to elect the lieutenant governor of Connecticut. Democratic nominee Charles Wilbert Snow won the election against incumbent Republican lieutenant governor William L. Hadden.

== General election ==
On election day, November 7, 1944, Democratic nominee Charles Wilbert Snow won the election with 51.10% of the vote, thereby gaining Democratic control over the office of lieutenant governor. Snow was sworn in as the 88th lieutenant governor of Connecticut on January 3, 1945.

=== Results ===
Connecticut lieutenant gubernatorial election, 1944
Party	Candidate	Votes	%
Democratic	Charles Wilbert Snow	418,720	51.10
Republican	William L. Hadden (incumbent)	401,078	48.90
Total votes		819,798	100.00
Democratic gain from Republican			
