= J. Emile Verret =

American politician

41st Lieutenant Governor of Louisiana
- In office May 9, 1944 – May 11, 1948
- Governor: Jimmie H. Davis
- Preceded by: Marc M. Mouton
- Succeeded by: William Joseph "Bill" Dodd

Iberia Parish school board member
- In office 1912–1944

Personal details
- Born: September 13, 1885 Iberia Parish, Louisiana
- Died: February 9, 1965 (aged 79)
- Party: Democratic
- Education: University of Louisiana at Lafayette
- Occupation: Businessman

J. Emile Verret (September 13, 1885 – February 9, 1965) was a Louisiana politician who served as the 41st lieutenant governor of Louisiana from 1944 to 1948.

Born in Iberia Parish, Louisiana, Verret received an undergraduate degree from University of Louisiana at Lafayette (then the Southwestern Louisiana Industrial Institute) in 1905, and attended Soule Business College in New Orleans.

In 1947, during his service as lieutenant governor, when Governor Jimmie Davis was out of state and a hurricane forced the evacuation of the capital, Verret signed a proclamation declaring his house in New Iberia to be the acting state capitol for the day. The Daily Iberian republished this article fifty years later. He was also a member of the Knights of Columbus.

Veret died on February 9, 1965, and is interred at St. Peter's cemetery, New Iberia, Louisiana.

== Notes ==
Party political offices
Preceded by Marc M. Mouton	Democratic nominee for Lieutenant Governor of Louisiana; 1944	Succeeded by Bill Dodd
Political offices
Preceded by Marc M. Mouton	Lieutenant Governor of Louisiana; 1944–1948	Succeeded by William J. "Bill" Dodd
