= Allison Kolb =

American auditor (1915–1973)

Allison Ray Kolb (November 1, 1915 – December 23, 1973) was the elected auditor of Louisiana from 1952 to 1956. He served as a Democrat. He was part of the Louisiana Constitutional Convention of 1973.

He campaigned for state treasurer in 1968 as a Republican, but lost to Mary Evelyn Parker. He was politically active until his death still making proposals to the Louisiana constitutional convention in April 1973.

He was from Colfax and obtained his law degree from Louisiana State University.

He lived in Baton Rouge and had a wife Dorothy, no children but numerous nieces and nephews.
