= 1940 Tennessee gubernatorial election =

- November 5, 1940
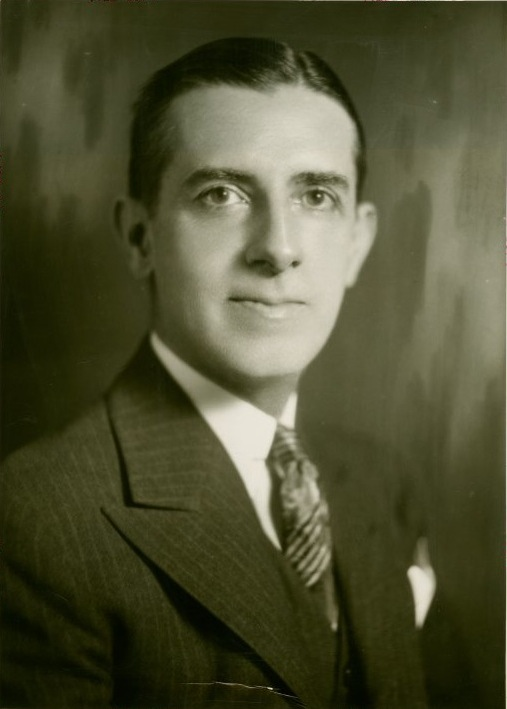

Nominee	Prentice Cooper	C. Arthur Bruce
Party	Democratic	Republican
Popular vote	323,466	125,245
Percentage	72.09%	27.91%
- County results Cooper: 50–60% 60–70% 70–80% 80–90% >90% Bruce: 50–60% 60–70% 70–80%
Governor before election
Prentice Cooper
Democratic
Elected Governor
Prentice Cooper
Democratic

The 1940 Tennessee gubernatorial election was held on November 5, 1940. Incumbent Democratic governor Prentice Cooper defeated Republican nominee C. Arthur Bruce with 72.1% of the vote.

== Primary elections ==
Prentice Cooper defeated Knoxville inventor George Roby Dempster in the Democratic primary.

== General election ==
=== Candidates ===
- Prentice Cooper, Democratic
- C. Arthur Bruce, Republican

=== Results ===
1940 Tennessee gubernatorial election
Party	Candidate	Votes	%	±%
Democratic	Prentice Cooper (incumbent)	323,466	72.09%	
Republican	C. Arthur Bruce	125,245	27.91%	
Majority		198,221		
Turnout				
Democratic hold		Swing		

== See also ==
- 1940 United States presidential election in Tennessee
- 1940 United States Senate election in Tennessee
