= 1940 United States Senate election in Tennessee =

- November 5, 1940
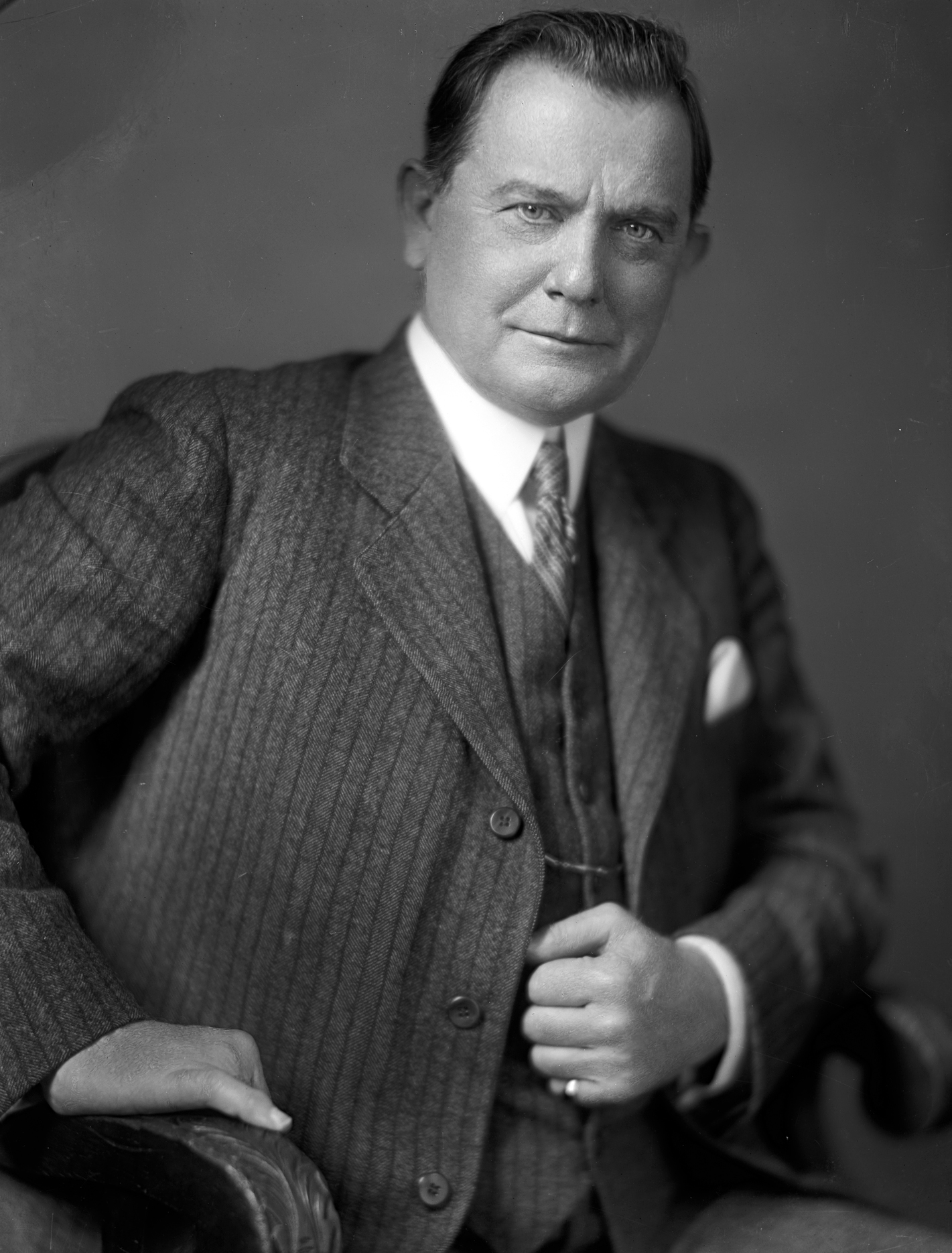

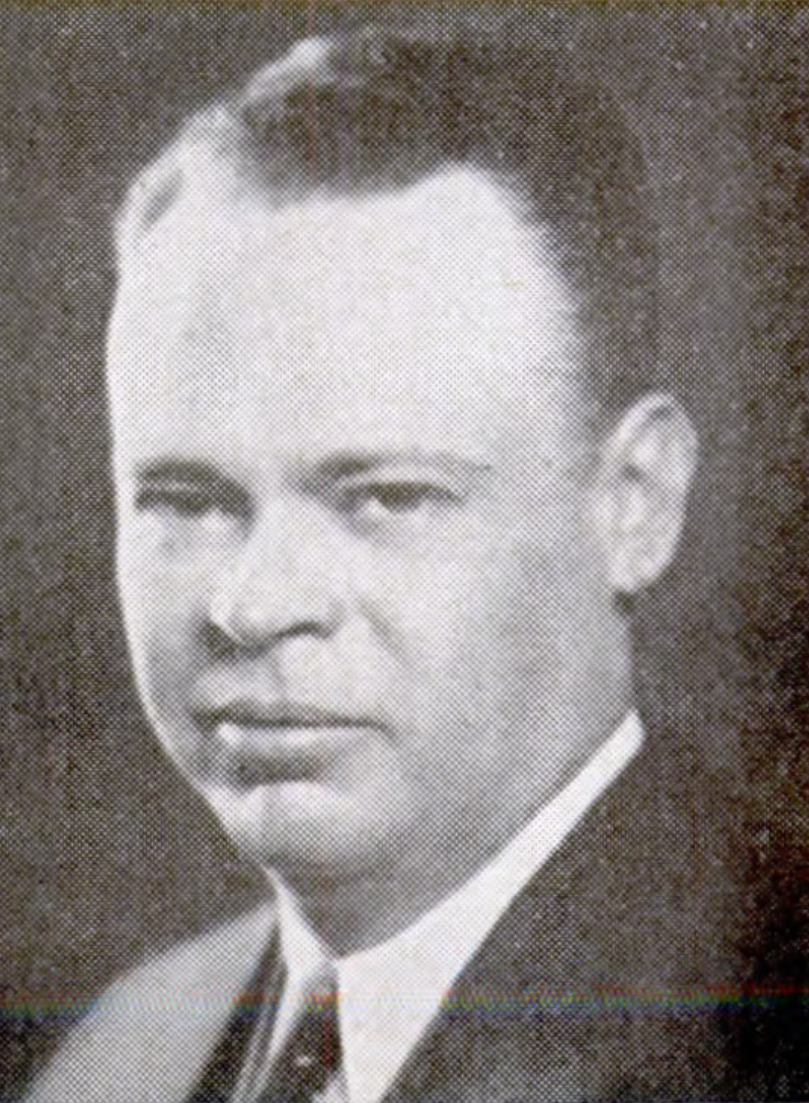
Nominee	Kenneth McKellar	Howard Baker Sr.
Party	Democratic	Republican
Popular vote	295,440	121,790
Percentage	70.80%	29.19%
- County results McKellar: 50–60% 60–70% 70–80% 80–90% >90% Baker: 50–60% 60–70% 70–80% 80–90%
U.S. senator before election
Kenneth McKellar
Democratic
Elected U.S. senator
Kenneth McKellar
Democratic

The 1940 United States Senate election in Tennessee was held on November 5, 1940. Incumbent Democratic Senator Kenneth D. McKellar was re-elected to a fifth term in office, defeating Republican Howard Baker.

== Democratic primary ==
=== Candidates ===
- Kenneth McKellar, incumbent senator since 1917
- John Randolph Neal Jr., attorney, academic, and perennial candidate
- Claude C. Tolen

=== Results ===
1940 Democratic Senate primary
Party	Candidate	Votes	%
Democratic	Kenneth McKellar (incumbent)	230,055	91.54%
Democratic	John Randolph Neal Jr.	14,583	5.80%
Democratic	Claude C. Tolen	6,671	2.66%
Total votes		251,309	100.00%

== General election ==
=== Candidates ===
- Howard Baker Sr., former state representative and candidate for governor in 1938 (Republican)
- Kenneth McKellar, incumbent senator since 1917 (Democratic)
- John Randolph Neal Jr., attorney, academic, and perennial candidate (independent)

=== Results ===
1940 U.S. Senate election in Tennessee
Party	Candidate	Votes	%	±%
Democratic	Kenneth McKellar (incumbent)	295,440	70.80%	▲7.41
Republican	Howard Baker Sr.	121,790	29.19%	▼6.62
Independent	John Randolph Neal Jr.	35	0.01%	N/A
Total votes		417,265	100.00%	N/A
Democratic hold				

== See also ==
- 1940 United States presidential election in Tennessee
- 1940 Tennessee gubernatorial election
- 1940 United States Senate elections
