= Marc M. Mouton =

American politician

40th Lieutenant Governor of Louisiana
- In office May 14, 1940 – May 9, 1944
- Governor: Sam H. Jones
- Preceded by: Coleman Lindsey
- Succeeded by: J. Emile Verret

Personal details
- Born: June 1, 1901 Johnson, Louisiana
- Died: August 30, 1944 (aged 43)
- Party: Democratic
- Spouse: Alice Campbell Mouton
- Education: Tulane University

Marc M. Mouton (June 1, 1901 – August 30, 1944) served as the 40th lieutenant governor of Louisiana from 1940 until 1944 during the administration of Governor Sam Houston Jones. He graduated from the medical department of Tulane University in New Orleans, Louisiana.

He married Alice Campbell, daughter of Judge William Campbell. Mouton, a Democrat, was a resident of Lafayette, Louisiana, and died in the summer of 1944 shortly after vacating the office of lieutenant governor to J. Emile Verret of New Iberia.

Party political offices
Preceded by Earl Long	Democratic nominee for Lieutenant Governor of Louisiana; 1940	Succeeded by J. Emile Verret
Political offices
Preceded by Coleman Lindsey	Lieutenant Governor of Louisiana; 1940—1944	Succeeded by J. Emile Verret
