= 1944 Guatemalan Constitutional Assembly election =

Constitutional Assembly elections were held in Guatemala between 28 and 30 December 1944. The United Front of Arevalist Parties won 50 of the 65 seats.
