= Davis political family =

Irish and British-American political family

Davis
- Current region: New England, United States
- Origin: Ireland, England
- Members: John Davis, John Davis, John Chandler Bancroft Davis, Horace Davis, John Davis Lodge, Charles Henry Davis.
- Connected families: Bancroft family, Lodge family, Cabot family

The Davis family is an Irish American and British American family, prominent in American politics and government. Their political involvement has revolved around the Whig Party, the Federalist Party, and the Republican Party. Harvard and Yale educations have been frequent among them, and most had gone further on to law school. Some were in clubs at these schools such as the Fox Club at Harvard and has one of the founding members of the Skull and Dagger secret society at Yale and Harvard.

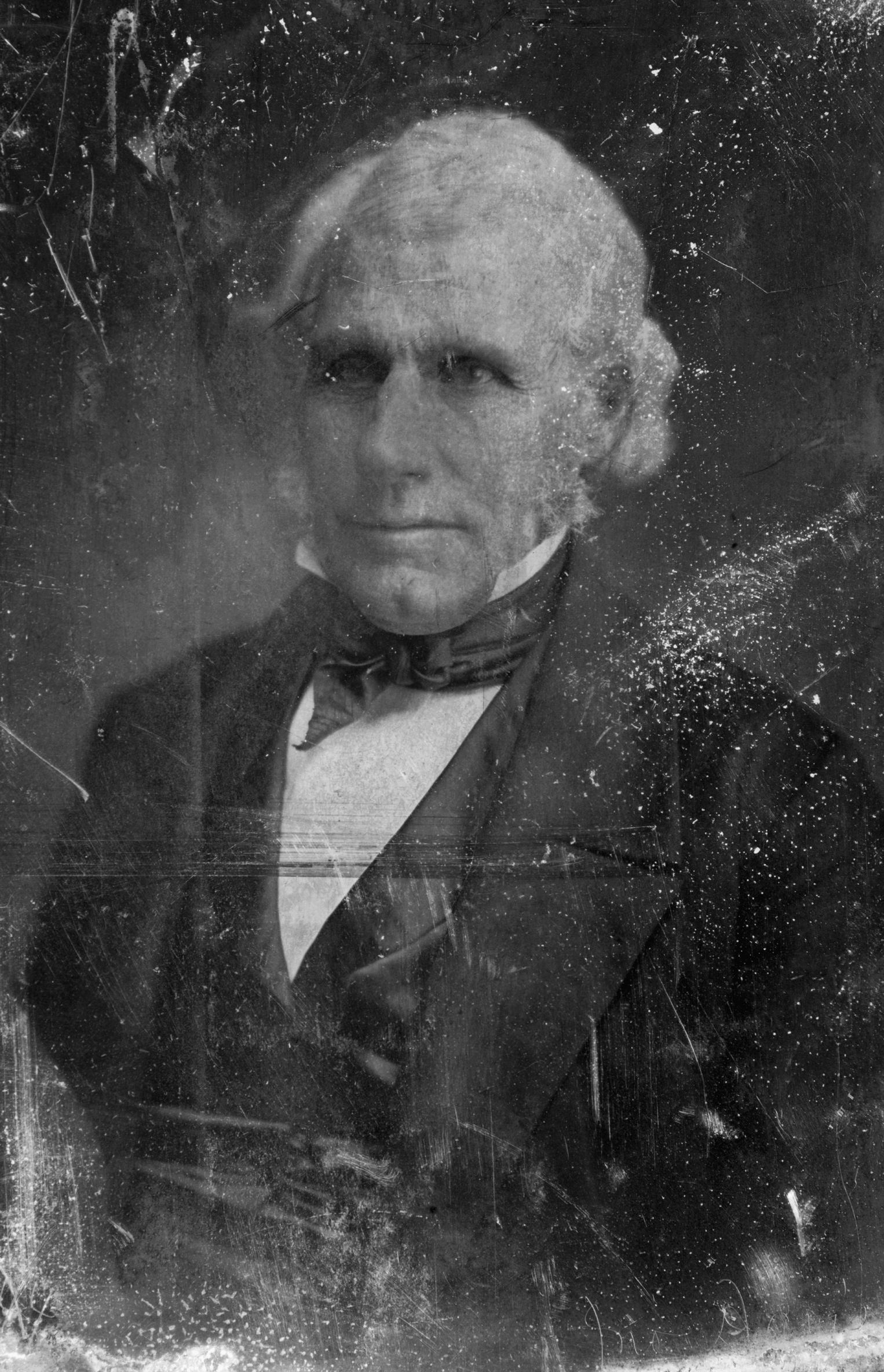
John Davis: Massachusetts Governor, Senator, and Representative

The members include the jurist John Davis (1761–1847), who was a lawyer in Plymouth, Massachusetts, and a delegate from Plymouth to the Massachusetts state convention, called to consider adoption of the Federal Constitution. He was three times in the Massachusetts House of Representatives, and was a state senator of Plymouth County, Massachusetts. Davis was President George Washington's Comptroller of the Treasury of the United States, and Washington then appointed him the United States Attorney for the district of Massachusetts. He was President John Adams' appointed judge of the United States district court for the district of Massachusetts. His probable most noted achievement was his wise handling of the law in regards to commercial mercantile embarrassment of New England at the time of an embargo and the War of 1812 which instilled the community's confidence in the law. He served as president of the Massachusetts Historical Society (1818–1835) and was said to be the first person to refer to the Plymouth colonists as pilgrims in his ode to an anniversary celebration in 1794. He was a Fellow of the American Academy of Arts and Sciences as well as the treasurer (1810) and member of the board of overseers (1827–1836).

A different John Davis (1787–1854) was a governor, United States senator, and United States representative of Massachusetts. Elizabeth Davis Bliss was John Davis's sister who married George Bancroft (1800–1891), who was an American historian, statesman, and who as the U.S. secretary of the Navy, he established the United States Naval Academy at Annapolis, and was a U.S. minister to Britain. His father was Aaron Bancroft (1755–1839) who was an American clergyman, pastor, minuteman, and president of the American Unitarian Association.

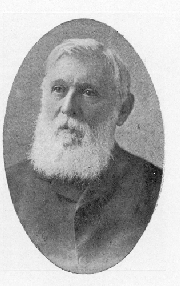
John Chandler Bancroft Davis

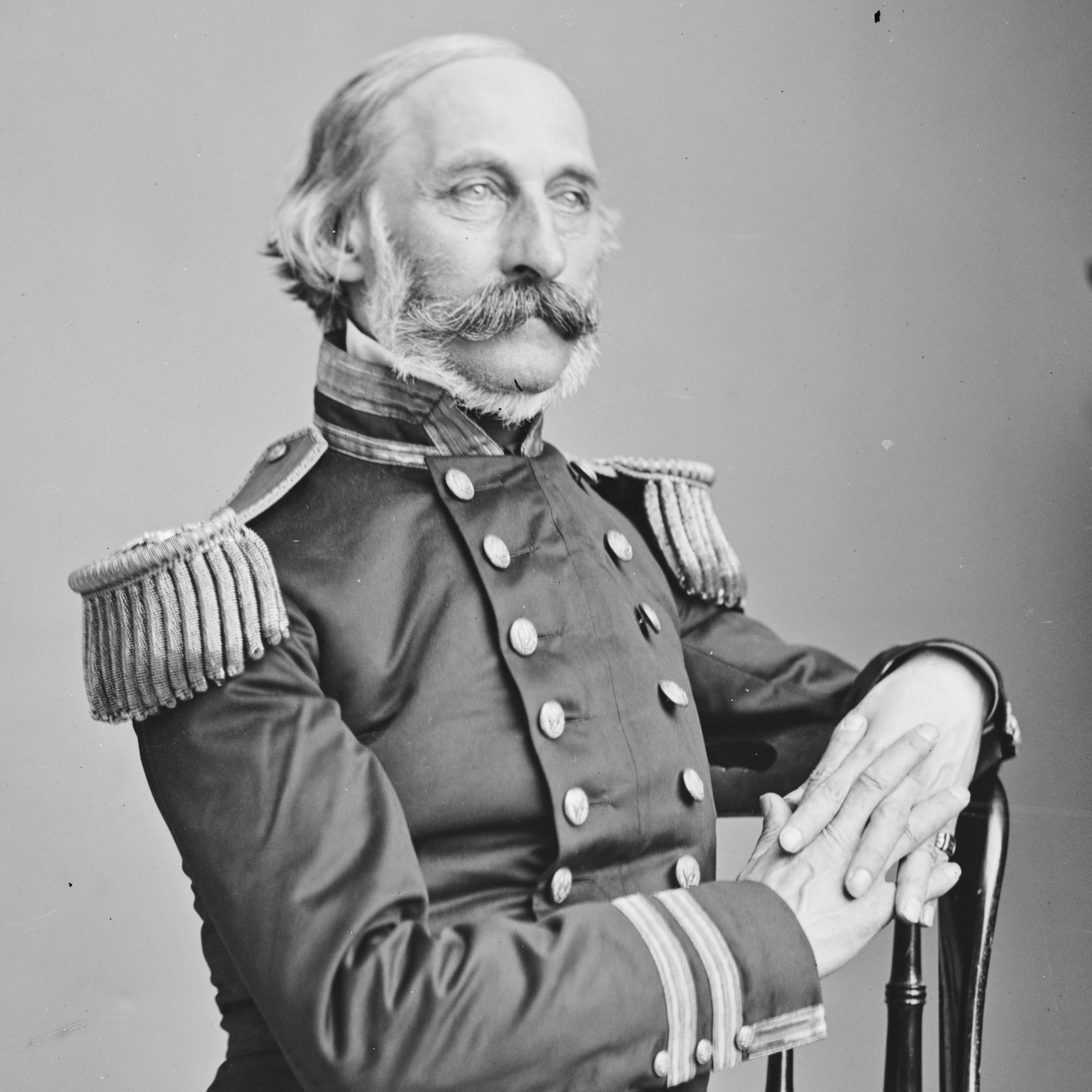
Admiral Charles H. Davis

Then with Davis' two sons, John Chandler Bancroft Davis (1822–1907), who was an American lawyer and diplomat, serving as the 7th, 9th, and 14th assistant secretary of state to the president. He was also the ninth reporter of decisions of the U.S. Supreme Court. His brother, Horace Davis (1831–1916), was a United States representative from California, an American author, and president of the University of California, Berkeley.

Another great-great-grandson of Governor John Davis is John Davis Lodge (1903–1985), a governor of Connecticut, an actor, and a U.S. ambassador to Spain, Argentina and Switzerland. His brother, Henry Cabot Lodge Jr. (1902–1985) was a United States senator from Massachusetts, a U.S. ambassador at large, to the United Nations, South Vietnam (twice), West Germany, and a candidate for Vice President of the United States.

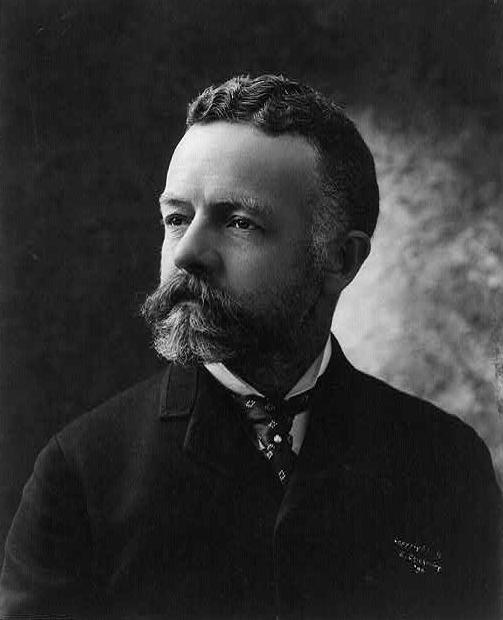
Henry Cabot Lodge

These two brothers' uncle was Augustus Peabody Gardner (1865–1918), who was a United States representative from Massachusetts, captain and assistant adjutant general on the staff of General James Wilson during the Spanish–American War, chairman of the Committee on Industrial Arts and Expositions in Congress, and he was colonel in the Adjutant General's Department, and a United States Infantryman, with rank of major. Their grandfather was Henry Cabot Lodge (1850–1924) who was a United States senator from Massachusetts, United States representative of Massachusetts, president pro tempore of the United States Senate, historian, dean of the United States Senate, chairman of the United States Senate Committee on Foreign Relations, and first Senate majority leader. Their great-grandfather was Admiral Charles Henry Davis (1807–1877), who was the superintendent of the United States Naval Observatory, and a board member of the Lighthouse Board and the Naval Observatory in his retirement. Their great-great grandfather was Elijah Hunt Mills (1776–1829), a United States senator from Massachusetts, and United States representative of Massachusetts. And their great-great-grandfather was George Cabot (1752–1823), was an American merchant, seaman, he was a United States senator from Massachusetts, the presiding officer of the Hartford Convention, he was a member of the Massachusetts Provincial Congress in 1775, a delegate to the state constitutional convention in 1777, a delegate to the state convention that adopted the United States Constitution in 1787, he was elected (as "Pro-Administration") to the United States Senate (1791–1796), and when he resigned he was appointed to but declined to be the first United States secretary of the Navy in 1798.

Unrelated to the political careers in this family, John Davis Lodge and Henry Cabot Lodge Jr.'s father was the American poet George Cabot Lodge (1873–1909), who was married to Mathilda Elizabeth Frelinghuysen (Davis) Lodge. Henry Cabot Lodge's wife was Anna Cabot Mills Davis, whose maternal aunt was married to Benjamin Peirce (1809–1880), an American mathematician who taught at Harvard University for forty years, instrumental in the development of Harvard's science curriculum, director of the U.S. Coast Survey, and made contributions to celestial mechanics, number theory, algebra, and the philosophy of mathematics. Benjamin's son was Charles Sanders Peirce (1839–1914), chemist, logician, mathematician, physicist, and acknowledged as the founder of the pragmatic movement in philosophy.

Henry Cabot Lodge Jr.'s son is George C. Lodge (born 1927), who is the Jaime and Josefina Chua Tiampo Professor of Business Administration, Emeritus, at Harvard Business School. Lodge was a top official at the United States Department of Labor, and was a candidate for the United States Senate for Massachusetts, but lost to Edward Kennedy.

== Contributions and memorials ==
- Mount Davis (New Hampshire)
- List of United States political families
- United States Naval Academy
- Bancroft treaties
- USS George Bancroft (SSBN-643)
- USS Bancroft (DD-256)
- USS Bancroft (DD-598)
- Treaty of Washington
- Alabama claims
- Little Women
- The Scarlet Empress
- The Little Colonel
- French Legion of Honor
- Governor John Davis Lodge Turnpike
- Lodge Committee
- A species of sea anemone native to the coasts of New England and Nova Scotia, the Rhodactis davisii, is named for Davis.
- USS Davis (DD-65)
- USS Davis (DD-395)
- USS Davis (TB-12)
- The Peirce Crater

== Cemeteries of burials ==
- Mount Auburn Cemetery
- Cypress Lawn Cemetery
- Arlington National Cemetery
