= George C. Lodge =

American academic and politician (1927–2026)

George C. Lodge II
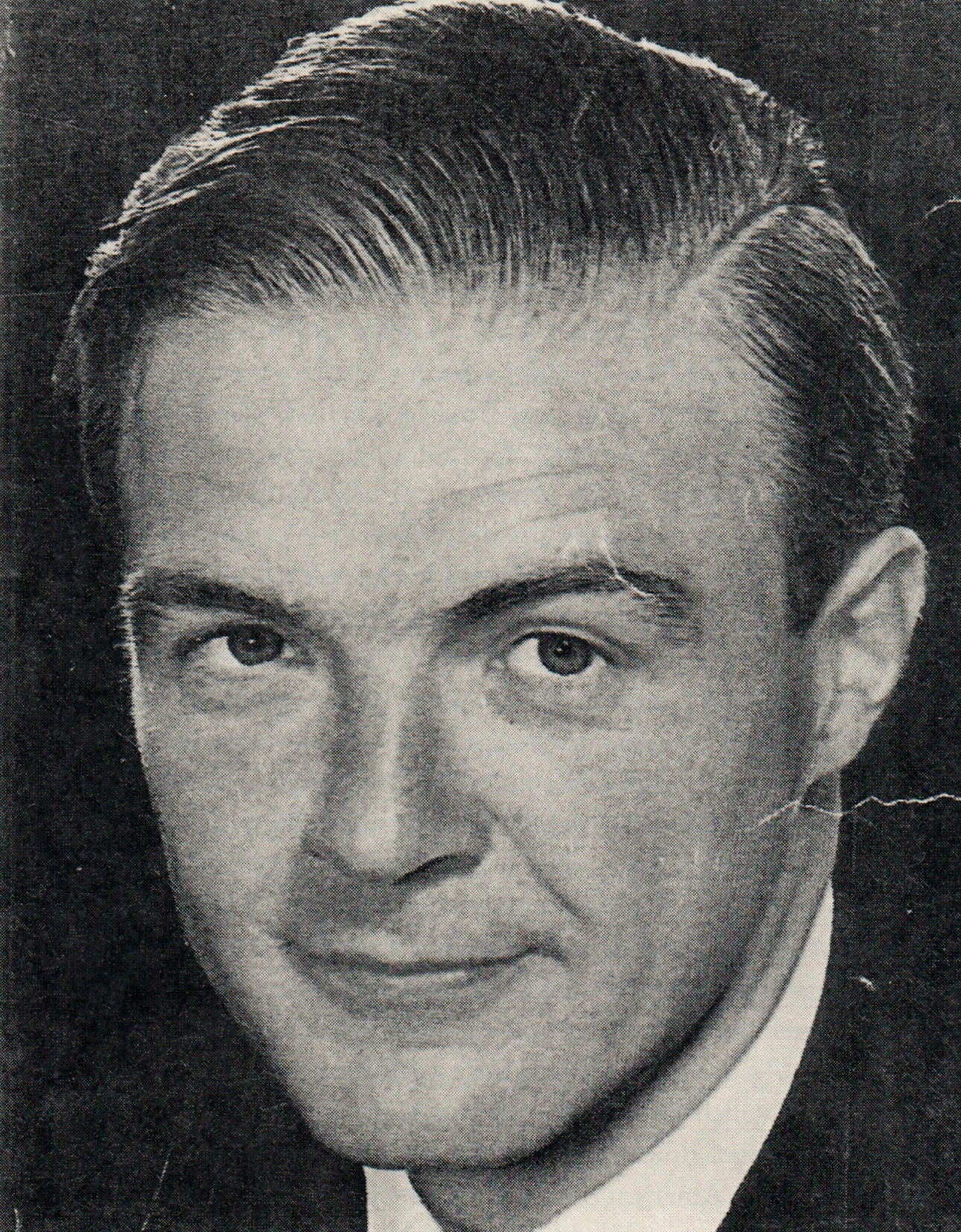
- Photo of Lodge from his 1962 campaign for U.S. Senate
- Born: George Cabot Lodge II; July 7, 1927; Boston, Massachusetts, U.S.
- Died: January 4, 2026 (aged 98)
- Education: Harvard University (BA)
- Occupations: Politician, academic
- Political party: Republican
- Spouses: Nancy Kunhardt (m. 1949; died 1997) Susan Alexander Powers (m. 1997; died 2024)
- Children: 6
- Parent(s): Henry Cabot Lodge Jr. Emily Esther Sears
- Relatives: Lodge family
- Military career
- Allegiance: United States
- Branch: United States Navy
- Service years: 1945–1946

George Cabot Lodge II (July 7, 1927 – January 4, 2026) was an American academic and politician. In 1962, he was the Republican nominee in the special election to succeed John F. Kennedy in the United States Senate and lost to Ted Kennedy. He was the son of Henry Cabot Lodge Jr., who lost reelection to the Senate in 1952 to John F. Kennedy. His father was also the Republican vice-presidential nominee in 1960, an election Kennedy also won.

== Early life ==
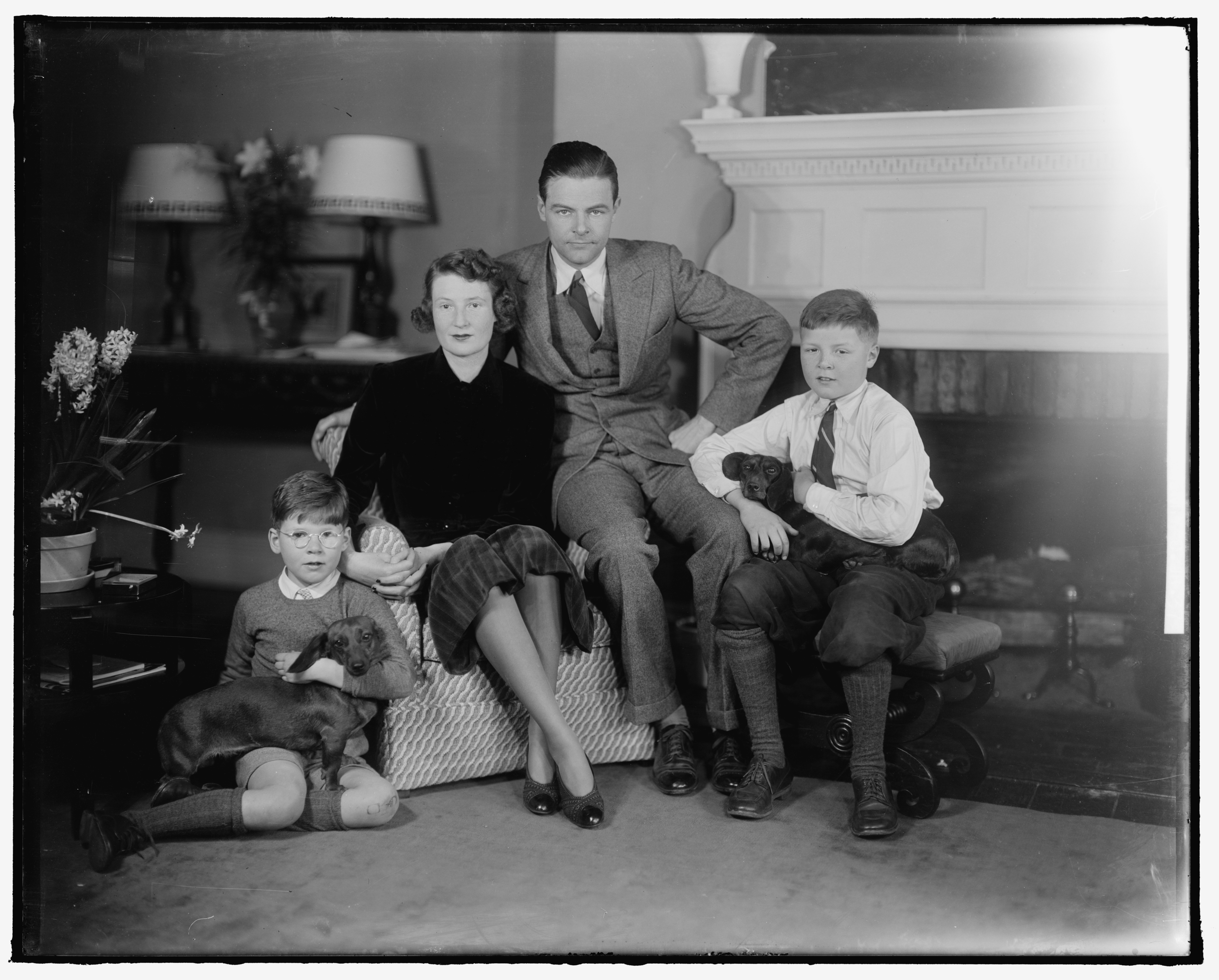
Lodge as a child, seated with his mother, father, and brother.

Lodge was born on July 7, 1927, in Boston. His father was Henry Cabot Lodge Jr., a United States Senator from Massachusetts, U.S. Ambassador to the United Nations and South Vietnam, and the Republican nominee for vice president in 1960. After finishing high school at Groton School, Lodge served in the U.S. Navy in 1945–1946 and then entered Harvard College, graduating cum laude in 1950. At Harvard, he was a member of the Krokodiloes.

== Career ==
Lodge was a political reporter and columnist at the Boston Herald before entering federal civil service. In 1954, Lodge became Director of Information at the U.S. Department of Labor. In 1958, he was appointed Assistant Secretary of Labor for International Affairs by Dwight D. Eisenhower, and he was reappointed by John F. Kennedy in 1961. He was the U.S. Delegate to the International Labour Organization, and was elected chairman of the organization's Governing Body in 1960.

Lodge later entered politics, and was the Republican nominee in the 1962 United States Senate special election in Massachusetts. Ted Kennedy was the Democratic nominee; it was the third time a Lodge had faced a Kennedy in a Massachusetts election. Lodge's father was the incumbent in the 1952 United States Senate election in Massachusetts for the same seat, and lost to John Kennedy. Lodge's great-grandfather Henry Cabot Lodge was reelected to the same Senate seat as the incumbent in the 1916 United States Senate election in Massachusetts against the Kennedy brothers' grandfather John F. Fitzgerald.

In 1961, Lodge became a member of the Harvard Business School faculty, leaving to run for office in 1962 before returning the following year. He remained at Harvard until he retired in 1997, when he became Professor Emeritus. He conducted research, published articles, and received honorary fellowships and distinctions in the latter parts of his career.

== Personal life and death ==
Lodge met his first wife, Nancy Kunhardt, daughter of author Dorothy Kunhardt, while she was studying at the Harvard Graduate School of Education, and they married in 1949. They had six children. Two of their daughters are published authors. The eldest, also named Nancy, is a children's author and a scholar of art history. Emily Sears Lodge has written two books, a Lodge family history and a memoir of her time living in the Middle East. After his first wife's death in 1997, Lodge married Susan Alexander Powers, who died in 2024. Lodge died on January 4, 2026, at the age of 98.

== Archives and records ==
- George Cabot Lodge papers at Baker Library Special Collections, Harvard Business School

== Ancestry ==
Ancestors of George C. Lodge

16. John Ellerton Lodge
8. Henry Cabot Lodge, U.S. Senator from Massachusetts
17. Anna Sophia Cabot (granddaughter of George Cabot, U.S. Senator from Massachusetts)
4. George Cabot Lodge
18. Charles Henry Davis
9. Anna Cabot Mills Davis
19. Harriette Blake Mills (daughter of Elijah H. Mills, U.S. Senator from Massachusetts)
2. Henry Cabot Lodge Jr., U.S. Senator from Massachusetts
20. Bruyn Hasbrouck Davis
10. John Davis
21. Martha Whiting Stickney
5. Mathilda Elizabeth Frelinghuysen Davis
22. Frederick T. Frelinghuysen
11. Sarah Helen Frelinghuysen
23. Mathilda Elizabeth Grislow
1. George Cabot Lodge II
24. David Sears
12. David Sears
25. Miriam Clark Mason
6. Henry Francis Sears
26. Gould Hoyt
13. Emily Esther Hoyt
27. Sabina Sheaff
3. Emily Esther Sears
28.
14. William Struthers
29.
7. Jean Irvine Struthers
30.
15. Savannah Durburrow
31.

== Bibliography ==
Incomplete

Books

- Spearheads of Democracy: Labor in the Developing Countries. Harper & Row. 1962.
- The New American Ideology (1st ed.). Alfred A. Knopf. 1975. ISBN 9780394492278.
- Lodge, George C.; Vogel, Ezra F. (1987). Ideology and National Competitiveness: An Analysis of Nine Countries. Harvard Business Press. ISBN 9780875841472.
- Perestroika for America: restructuring U.S. business-government relations for competitiveness in the world economy. Harvard Business Press. 1990. ISBN 9780875842349.
- Managing globalization in the age of interdependence. Pfeiffer Publishing. 1995. ISBN 9780893842710.
- Lodge, George C.; Wilson, Craig (2006). A Corporate Solution to Global Poverty: How Multinationals Can Help the Poor and Invigorate Their Own Legitimacy. Princeton University Press. ISBN 9780691122298.
- The American Disease: Why the American economic system is faltering . . . and how the trend can be changed with a minimum of crisis. Knopf Doubleday Publishing Group. 2013. ISBN 9780307831927.

Party political offices
Preceded by Vincent Celeste	Republican nominee for U.S. Senator from Massachusetts (Class 1); 1962	Succeeded by Howard J. Whitmore Jr.
