= 1952 United States Senate election in Massachusetts =

- November 4, 1952
- Turnout: 90.94% (of registered voters)
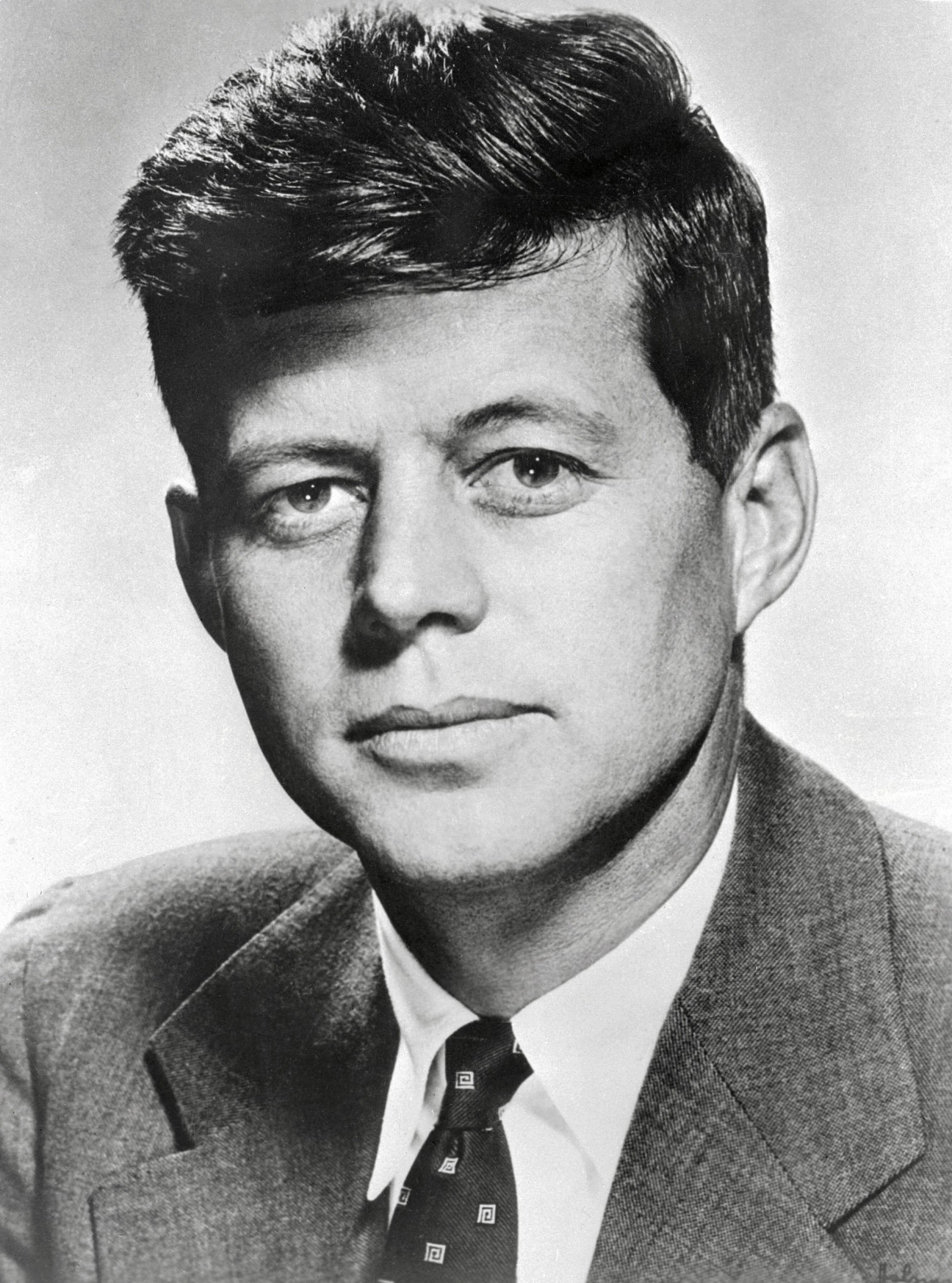

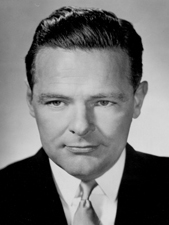
Nominee	John F. Kennedy	Henry Cabot Lodge Jr.
Party	Democratic	Republican
Popular vote	1,211,984	1,141,247
Percentage	51.34%	48.35%
- Kennedy: 50–60% 60–70% 70–80% Lodge: 40–50% 50–60% 60–70% 70–80% 80–90% >90%
U.S. senator before election
Henry Cabot Lodge Jr.
Republican
Elected U.S. Senator
John F. Kennedy
Democratic

The 1952 United States Senate election in Massachusetts was held on November 4, 1952. Republican incumbent Henry Cabot Lodge Jr. ran for a fourth (and second consecutive) term in office but was defeated by U.S. representative and future president John F. Kennedy, the Democratic Party nominee.

Primary elections were held on September 16. Neither candidate was opposed for renomination.

This election marked the decline of the Lodge family dynasty and the ascent of the Kennedy family dynasty in Massachusetts politics. Lodge, along with his grandfather Henry Cabot Lodge, had held one of Massachusetts's two Senate seats for 43 of the previous 60 years. Kennedy and his younger brother Ted Kennedy would hold this seat for a combined 53 of the next 56 years.

== Background ==
The 1952 election for United States senator was a contest between representatives of two of New England's most prominent political families: the Lodges, who were Republican, and the Kennedys, who were Democratic. Each family also represented a starkly different aspect of New England culture.

Henry Cabot Lodge was the scion of an old political dynasty and member of the so-called Boston Brahmin class; he could trace his roots to the original Puritan pioneers who had first settled the state in the early seventeenth century, and his ancestors included no less than five United States senators. (Note: George Cabot, Elijah H. Mills, John W. Davis, and Henry Cabot Lodge, all of Massachusetts; and Frederick T. Frelinghuysen of New Jersey.) Lodge's grandfather, namesake, and primary guardian, Henry Cabot Lodge, had been a powerful member of the Senate from 1893 until his death in 1924, a close friend and ally of President Theodore Roosevelt, and a leading foe of President Woodrow Wilson. Lodge Jr. had first been elected to the U.S. Senate himself in 1936, when he was the only Republican candidate in the nation to flip a Democratic Senate seat. He was easily reelected in 1942, but resigned his seat to continue serving in the United States Army during World War II, where he helped negotiate the surrender of German forces in western Austria. In 1946, Lodge reclaimed the other Massachusetts seat by defeating Democratic incumbent David I. Walsh.

John F. Kennedy, who was only 35 years old, had served three terms representing Boston in the House. He was the grandson of Boston mayor John F. Fitzgerald and state senator P.J. Kennedy. Although the Kennedys were a much newer political dynasty than the Lodges, they had amassed a considerably larger fortune, in large part to the business activities of Kennedy's millionaire father, Joseph P. Kennedy Sr.. The Kennedys family were Irish and Catholic, while the Lodge family was Anglo-Saxon and Protestant, making the 1952 campaign the climax of a long struggle for power between older Protestant families, who had controlled politics in Massachusetts for generations, and the newer Catholic arrivals, who now outnumbered Protestants in Massachusetts. The Kennedys also personally viewed the 1952 race as a grudge match, as Lodge's grandfather had defeated Kennedy's grandfather, Boston mayor John F. Fitzgerald, in the 1916 election.

== Republican primary ==
=== Candidates ===
- Henry Cabot Lodge Jr., incumbent U.S. senator since 1947 (Note: Lodge previously served parts of two terms in the Senate from 1937 until 1944, when he resigned to serve in World War II.)

=== Results ===
Senator Lodge was unopposed for renomination.

1952 Republican U.S. Senate primary
Party	Candidate	Votes	%
Republican	Henry Cabot Lodge Jr. (incumbent)	394,896	99.98%
Write-in		93	0.02%
Total votes		394,989	100.00%
None	Blank votes	47,975	10.83%
Turnout		442,964	

== Democratic primary ==
=== Candidates ===
- John F. Kennedy, U.S. representative from Beacon Hill, Boston and son of Joseph P. Kennedy Sr.

==== Declined ====
- Paul A. Dever, governor of Massachusetts (ran for re-election and lost)

=== Results ===
Representative Kennedy was unopposed for the Democratic nomination. Although other, more experienced candidates considered the nomination, Kennedy entered the field early, and his large personal fortune deterred any potential challengers within the Democratic Party.

1952 Democratic U.S. Senate primary
Party	Candidate	Votes	%
Democratic	John F. Kennedy	394,138	100.00%
Write-in		9	0.00%
Total votes		394,147	100.00%
None	Blank votes	123,469	23.85%
Turnout		517,616	

== General election ==
=== Candidates ===
- Thelma Ingersoll (Socialist Labor)
- John F. Kennedy, U.S. representative from Beacon Hill, Boston and son of Joseph P. Kennedy Sr. (Democratic)
- Henry Cabot Lodge Jr., incumbent U.S. senator since 1947 (Republican)
- Mark R. Shaw (Prohibition)

=== Campaign ===
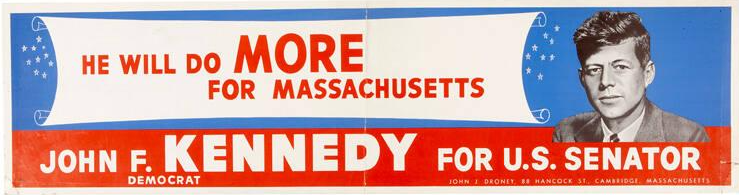
A Kennedy campaign sticker displays his slogan for the 1952 campaign, "KENNEDY WILL DO MORE FOR MASSACHUSETTS".

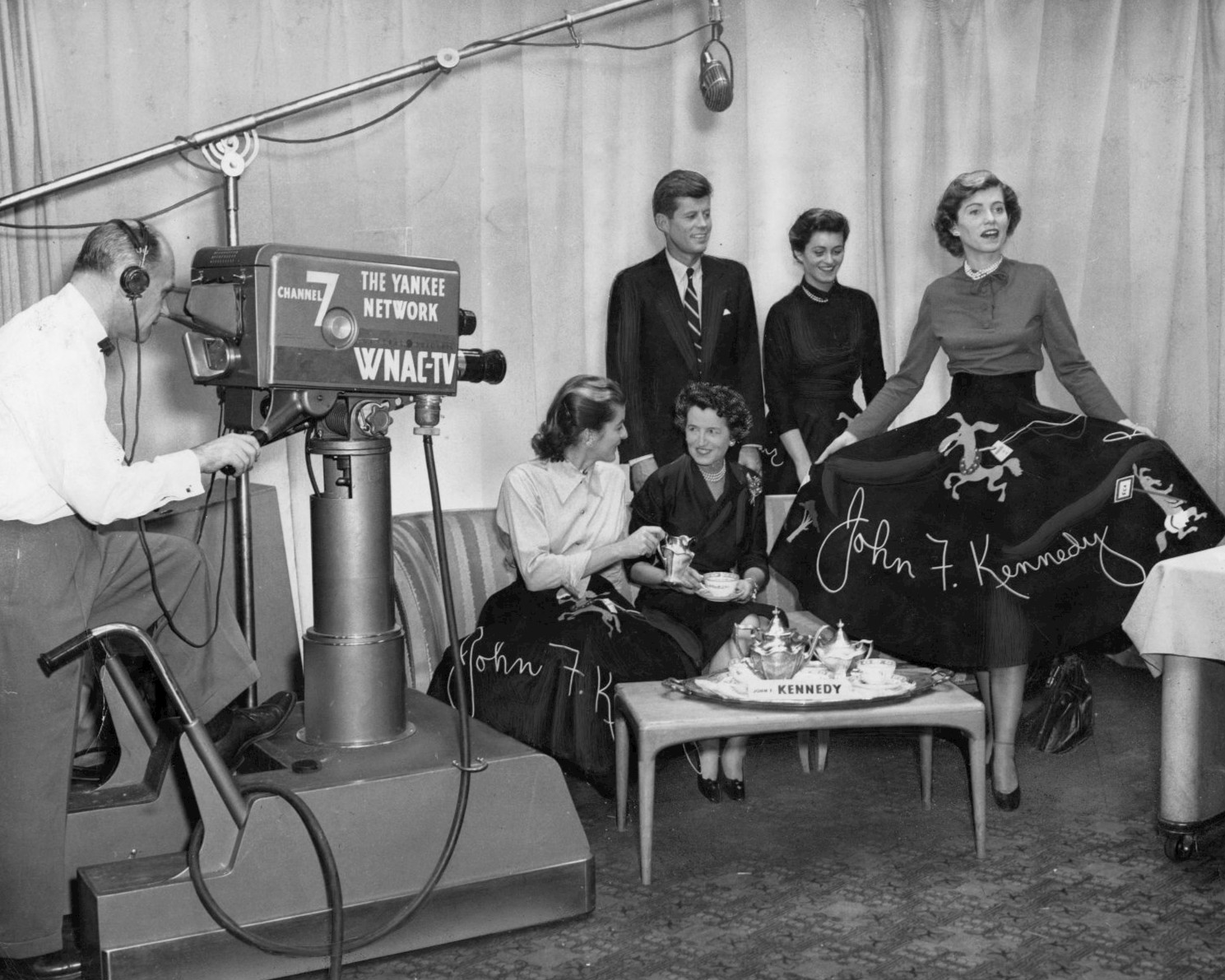
Members of the Kennedy family promoting their "Kennedy Teas" on WNAC-TV, Boston

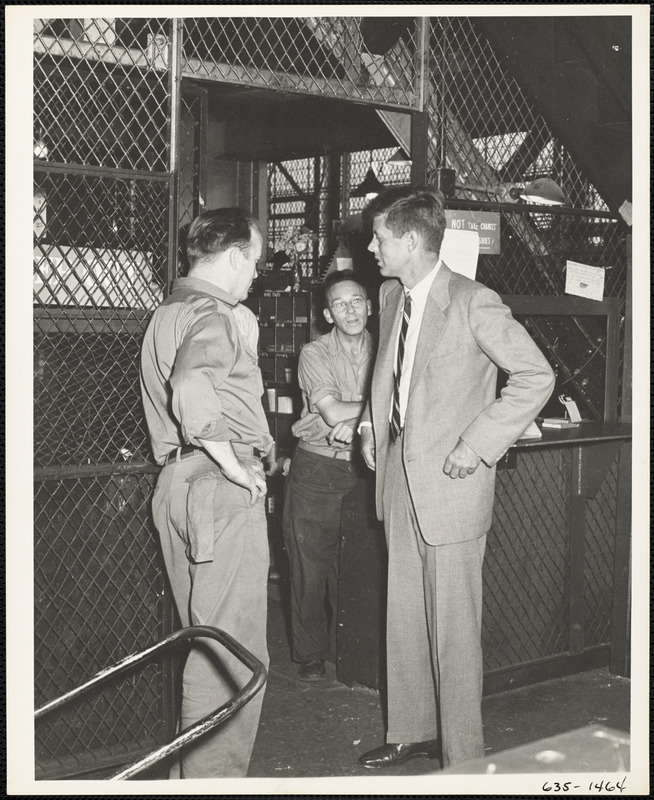
Kennedy talking to voters in Watertown, Massachusetts

Congressman Kennedy's Senate campaign was managed by his younger brother Robert F. Kennedy, who would perform the same function for his brother in the 1960 presidential campaign. Kennedy launched his campaign early in 1952 and made an intensive effort, by election day in November 1952 he had visited every city, town, and village in Massachusetts at least once. He also collected a record number of signatures for his petition for office, assembling a petition of over a quarter-million signatures. Many of those who signed the petition would later become campaign volunteers or workers for Kennedy in their hometowns. A famous innovation by the Kennedys in the 1952 Senate race were a series of "tea parties" sponsored by Kennedy's mother and sisters. Congressman Kennedy attended each of the tea parties and shook hands and charmed the voters (usually women) who were present; it is estimated that a total of 70,000 voters attended the tea parties, which was roughly his margin of victory over Lodge.

Lodge, meanwhile, neglected his Senate campaign for most of 1952. Instead, he focused on persuading Dwight D. Eisenhower, the popular World War II general, to run for and win the Republican presidential nomination over Ohio Senator Robert A. Taft, the leader of the party's conservatives. Lodge, a moderate and internationalist, strongly disagreed with Taft's isolationist foreign-policy views and felt that Taft could not win a presidential election. Lodge served as Eisenhower's campaign manager and played a key role in helping Eisenhower to beat Taft and win the Republican nomination. However, Lodge's prominent role in defeating Taft angered many of Taft's supporters in Massachusetts, and they vowed revenge.

=== Endorsements ===
When the usually Democratic-leaning but financially unstable Boston Post planned to endorse Lodge, Joseph Kennedy arranged for a $500,000 loan so the paper would endorse his son; John Kennedy stated, "We had to buy that fucking paper or I'd have been licked."

Kennedy privately courted many of Taft's more prominent backers in Massachusetts, and some of them, such as Basil Brewer, the publisher of the New Bedford Standard-Times, supported Kennedy over Lodge in their newspapers and editorials.

The nationally known and Catholic senator Joseph McCarthy of Wisconsin refused to campaign for Lodge, a fellow Republican, due to his friendship with the Kennedy family. McCarthy was popular among many Catholic voters in Massachusetts due to his Communist-hunting activities in Congress; William F. Buckley Jr. believed that Lodge probably would have won the election with McCarthy's help. On the weekend before the election, Eisenhower visited Boston and energetically campaigned for Lodge, but it was not enough.

=== Debates ===
The candidates debated twice. The first was on September 16, when the candidates squared off at South Junior High School in Waltham, Massachusetts before an overflow crowd of more than 1,000. The debate was largely a draw, with one reporter calling it a "gentlemanly tranquil forum." Kennedy and Lodge appeared together in October on national public affairs TV program called Keep Posted, which was broadcast live from New York City and simulcast by a Boston TV station. The topic was "Who will do more for the country, Eisenhower or Stevenson?" To many viewers, Lodge appeared uncomfortable with the medium of TV, whereas Kennedy seemed calm and relaxed.

=== Results ===
Although Eisenhower carried Massachusetts by over 200,000 votes, Kennedy narrowly upset Lodge, winning by 70,000 votes and three percentage points.

1952 U.S. Senate election in Massachusetts
Party	Candidate	Votes	%	±%
Democratic	John F. Kennedy	1,211,984	51.34%	▲11.62
Republican	Henry Cabot Lodge Jr. (incumbent)	1,141,247	48.35%	▼11.20
Socialist Labor	Thelma Ingersoll	4,683	0.20%	▼0.36
Prohibition	Mark R. Shaw	2,508	0.11%	▼0.06
Write-in		3	0.00%	{{{change}}}
Total votes		2,360,425	100.00%	
None	Blank votes	64,123	2.64%	{{{change}}}
Total votes		2,424,548	90.94%	
Democratic gain from Republican				

== Aftermath ==
Since 1953, the Lodge name has faded from political prominence in Massachusetts, and the family has largely retired from state politics. Lodge left state politics behind, but he returned to national prominence as a leading American diplomat, Richard Nixon's running mate in 1960, and a presidential contender in his own right in 1964. The Kennedy family controlled the Senate seat won in 1952 until August 2009, as John Kennedy, family friend Benjamin A. Smith II, and then Ted Kennedy held the seat for over fifty years.

After his defeat, Lodge served Eisenhower's ambassador to the United Nations, beginning a lengthy diplomatic career. In the 1960 presidential election, Lodge and Kennedy faced off again, with Kennedy running as the Democratic nominee for president and Lodge serving as the Republican nominee for vice president; Kennedy and Lyndon B. Johnson won. Lodge's son George C. Lodge lost the 1962 Massachusetts Senate special election to Ted Kennedy, the last time that the two families opposed one another in a political campaign.

Despite their families' long political rivalry, Kennedy appointed Lodge to the crucial role of United States ambassador to South Vietnam during the escalation of American involvement in the Vietnam War. He took office on August 26, 1963, shortly before Kennedy was assassinated in Dallas.

== See also ==
- 1952 United States Senate elections
