= 1916 United States Senate election in Massachusetts =

- November 7, 1916
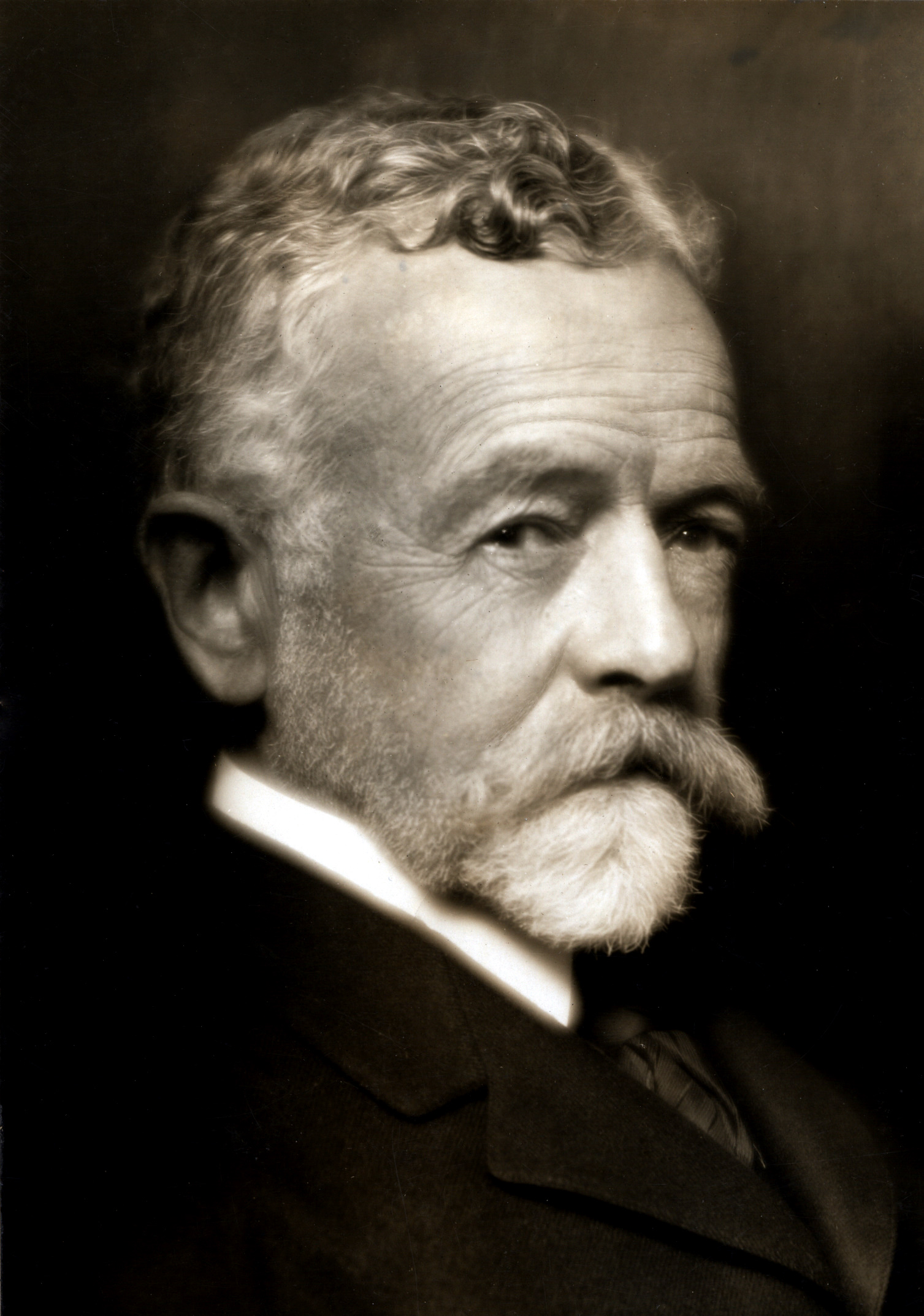

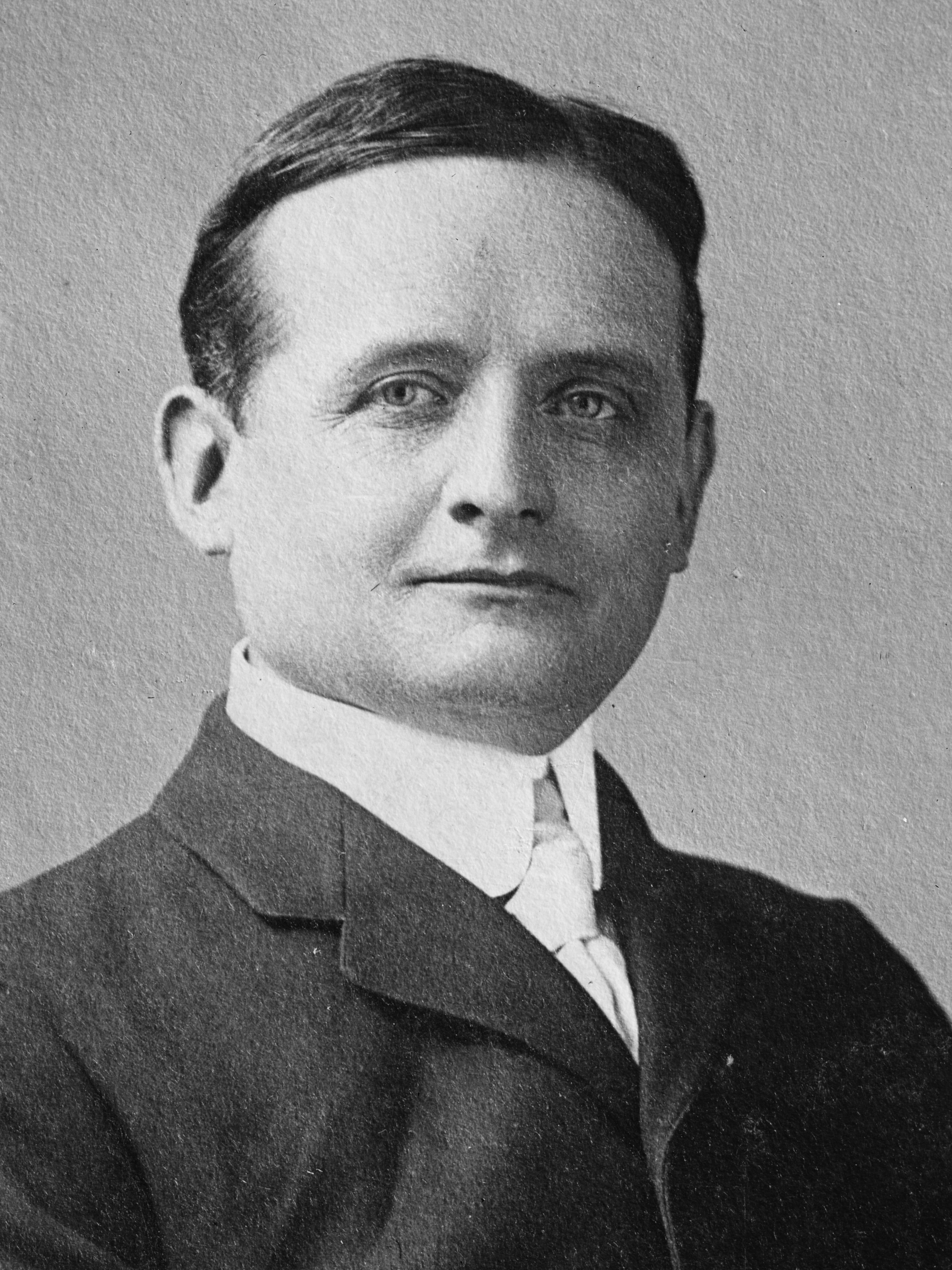
Nominee	Henry Cabot Lodge	John F. Fitzgerald
Party	Republican	Democratic
Popular vote	267,177	234,238
Percentage	51.68%	45.31%
- Lodge: 40–50% 50–60% 60–70% 70–80% 80–90% >90% Fitzgerald: 40–50% 50–60% 60–70%
Senator before election
Henry Cabot Lodge
Republican
Elected Senator
Henry Cabot Lodge
Republican

The 1916 United States Senate election in Massachusetts was held on November 7, 1916. Republican incumbent Henry Cabot Lodge was re-elected to a fifth term in office over John F. Fitzgerald.

This was the first United States Senate election in Massachusetts decided by direct election, rather than by the Massachusetts General Court, following the ratification of the Seventeenth Amendment to the United States Constitution.

This was the first of four elections contested between members of the Lodge and Kennedy dynasties. In 1952, Fitzgerald's grandson, John F. Kennedy, narrowly defeated Lodge's grandson, Henry Cabot Lodge Jr. In 1960, Kennedy again defeated Lodge Jr., as Richard Nixon's running mate, in the United States presidential election. In 1962, another of Fitzgerald's grandsons, Ted Kennedy, defeated Lodge's great-grandson, George C. Lodge.

== Republican primary ==
=== Candidates ===
- Henry Cabot Lodge, incumbent U.S. senator since 1893

=== Results ===
1916 U.S. Senate Republican primary
Party	Candidate	Votes	%
Republican	Henry Cabot Lodge (incumbent)	104,118	100.00%
Write-in		2	0.00%
Total votes		104,120	100.00%

== Democratic primary ==
=== Candidates ===
- John F. Fitzgerald, former mayor of Boston and U.S. representative

=== Background ===
Entering 1914, Boston mayor John F. Fitzgerald was strongly popular in the city, leading him to consider a challenge against the powerful Senator Lodge. When he wavered on whether to run for another term in office, however, James Michael Curley entered the race and usurped him in the January 1914 election. Fitzgerald briefly ran for re-election to another term in office, before withdrawing in December 1913. Though he cited illness, he was in fact being blackmailed by Curley and attorney Daniel H. Coakley, who had learned of his indiscretions with a cigarette girl, Elizabeth "Toodles" Ryan.

=== Campaign ===
The Democratic state convention was held in Springfield on October 7. Fitzgerald addressed the convention, praising President Wilson and criticizing Lodge, his Senate colleague John W. Weeks, and former President Theodore Roosevelt for opposing the President's re-election during war-time.

=== Results ===
1916 U.S. Senate Democratic primary
Party	Candidate	Votes	%
Democratic	John F. Fitzgerald	64,551	100.00%
Write-in		2	0.00%
Total votes		64,553	100.00%

== General election ==
=== Candidates ===
- John F. Fitzgerald, former mayor of Boston and U.S. representative (Democratic)
- Henry Cabot Lodge, incumbent U.S. Senator since 1893 (Republican)
- William N. McDonald (Socialist)

=== Campaign ===
The firs t of the general election came in September, before the primary elections. At a Lodge campaign rally in Beverly, the senator made no mention of Fitzgerald, but Lodge supporter Arthur Black criticized Fitzgerald's candidacy as a vanity run. Lodge focused his campaign on criticism of President Wilson and support for Republican nominee Charles Evans Hughes.

Fitzgerald attacked Lodge for his opposition to the direct election of U.S. senators and opposition to the Federal Employees' Compensation Act. He declared, "[Lodge's] career shows a singular lack of touch with the people... it is for private interests that he has stood during his career." Lodge also faced criticism over attacking President Wilson's response to the sinking of the RMS Lusitania as weak. Lodge was forced to withdraw his charge.

=== Results ===
1916 United States Senate election in Massachusetts
Party	Candidate	Votes	%
Republican	Henry Cabot Lodge (incumbent)	267,177	51.68%
Democratic	John F. Fitzgerald	234,238	45.31%
Socialist	William N. McDonald	15,558	3.01%
Write-in	All others	26	0.00%
Total votes		516,999	100.00%

== Aftermath ==
In 1952, Fitzgerald's grandson John F. Kennedy defeated Lodge's grandson Henry Cabot Lodge Jr. to win election to this same Senate seat. Fitzgerald's daughter Rose Fitzgerald Kennedy would say that her son John had "evened the score" with the Lodges and avenged her father's defeat. A final contest between the two families came in 1962, when John Kennedy's youngest brother (and another of Fitzgerald's grandsons) Ted Kennedy defeated younger Lodge's son George C. Lodge for the same seat.
