= Mount Davis (New Hampshire) =

Mountain in New Hampshire, United States

- Location within New Hampshire

Highest point
- Elevation: 3,819 ft (1,164 m)
- Coordinates: 44°12′15″N 71°18′38″W

Geography
- Location: Coös County, New Hampshire, U.S.
- Parent range: Presidential Range
- Topo map: USGS Stairs Mountain

Mount Davis is a mountain located in Coos County, New Hampshire. The mountain is located along Montalban Ridge, a series of summits extending south from Mount Washington in the White Mountains.

Mount Davis is named after the Davis family of Massachusetts, a political dynasty whose members, over 220 years, have held at least 20 federal and state elected offices throughout New England.

== See also ==
- List of mountains in New Hampshire
- White Mountain National Forest
