= George Cabot Lodge =

American poet (1873–1909)

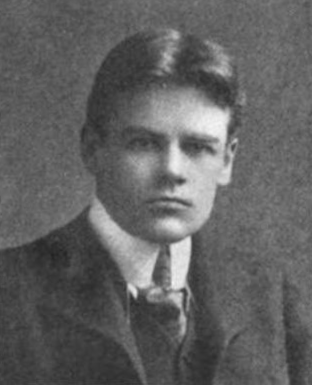
- Born: October 10, 1873; Boston, Massachusetts, U.S.
- Died: August 21, 1909 (aged 35); Tuckernuck Island, Massachusetts, U.S.
- Education: Harvard University; University of Paris
- Occupation: Poet
- Spouse: Mathilda Frelinghuysen Davis (m. 1900)
- Children: Henry Cabot Lodge Jr. John Davis Lodge; Helena Constance Lodge
- Parent(s): Henry Cabot Lodge; Anna Cabot Mills Davis
- Relatives: See Lodge family

George Cabot "Bay" Lodge (October 10, 1873 – August 21, 1909) was an American poet of the late 19th and early 20th centuries.

== Early life ==
Lodge was born in Boston on October 10, 1873, and grew up at his parents' home in Nahant, Massachusetts. A descendant of several Boston Brahmin families, he was the son of Anna Cabot Mills "Nannie" (née Davis) Lodge (1851–1915) and Henry Cabot Lodge (1850–1924), a Republican politician who eventually represented Massachusetts in the United States Senate. His siblings were Constance Davis Lodge (wife of Augustus Peabody Gardner and, after his death, Clarence Charles Williams) and art curator John Ellerton Lodge II.

His maternal grandparents were Rear Admiral Charles Henry Davis and Harriette Blake (née Mills) Davis (a daughter of U.S. Senator Elijah Hunt Mills). His paternal grandparents were John Ellerton Lodge and Anna (née Cabot) Lodge, a granddaughter of U.S. Senator George Cabot, Bay's namesake and great-great-grandfather.

Lodge began studies at Harvard College, and continued them in France, at the University of Paris, and Berlin into his mid-twenties. At Harvard, he was a member of the Harvard Polo Club.

== Career ==
In 1897, Lodge began work as a secretary to both his father and a U.S. Senate committee in Washington. He later served successfully in the Spanish–American War as a naval cadet. Lodge was a close friend of Theodore Roosevelt, who penned a fond introduction for the posthumous 1911 collection Poems and Dramas of George Cabot Lodge. He was best known for his delicate sonnets, such as the Song of the Wave, Essex, and Trumbull Stickney (Stickney was a friend and admirer), several of which were anthologized. His style and artistic outlook were deeply affected by the pessimism of Schopenhauer and Giacomo Leopardi, as well as French influences including Baudelaire and Leconte de Lisle.

After his death, his collected poems and dramas, in two volumes, were published in 1911 by Houghton Mifflin Company.

== Personal life ==
On August 19, 1900, he married Mathilda Elizabeth Frelinghuysen Davis (1876–1960) at the Church of the Advent in Boston. She was the daughter of Judge John J. Davis and Sarah Helen (née Frelinghuysen). After her father's death in 1902, her mother remarried to Brig. Gen. Charles L. McCawley. Her maternal grandfather was Secretary of State Frederick Theodore Frelinghuysen and her great-grandfather was Massachusetts governor John Davis. Together Mathilda and George were the parents of three children, including two sons who both became prominent politicians:

- Henry Cabot Lodge Jr. (1902–1985), who became a U.S. Senator from Massachusetts and was Richard Nixon's running mate in the 1960 United States presidential election.
- John Davis Lodge (1903–1985), an actor who became the governor of Connecticut. He married the Italian actress Francesca Braggiotti.
- Helena Constance Lodge (1905–1998), who married diplomat Edouard de Streel (1896–1981) of Brussels (with the Prince de Ligne as his best man), in 1929. He spent twenty years as equerry to Elisabeth of Bavaria, Queen of Belgium and was later created Baron de Streel with Helena becoming the Baroness de Streel.

Lodge died, aged 35, of heart failure while staying at the family camp on Tuckernuck Island, near Nantucket, on August 21, 1909. He was cremated at Mount Auburn Cemetery in Cambridge, Massachusetts. His widow died in 1960.

=== Descendants ===
Through his eldest son Henry, he was posthumously the grandfather of two grandsons, George Cabot Lodge II (a professor at Harvard Business School, who unsuccessfully ran against Ted Kennedy for the U.S. Senate) and Henry S. Lodge. Through his second son John, he was posthumously the grandfather of two granddaughters, Lily Lodge of Manhattan (co-founder of Actors Conservatory), and Beatrice Anna Cabot Lodge (wife of Antonio de Oyarzabal, who later became the Spanish Ambassador to the United States).

Through his daughter Helena, Baroness de Streel, he was posthumously the grandfather of three, Jacqueline de Streel (who married a Belgian banker); Quentin de Streel (d. 1998), and Elisabeth (née de Streel) de Wasseige.

=== Legacy ===
A biography, The Life of George Cabot Lodge (1911), was written by his friend and confidant Henry Adams.

== Selected works ==
- The Song of the Wave, and Other Poems (1898)
- Cain, a Drama (1904)
- The Great Adventure (1905)
- Herakles (1908)
