= Lodge family =

New England political family

Lodge
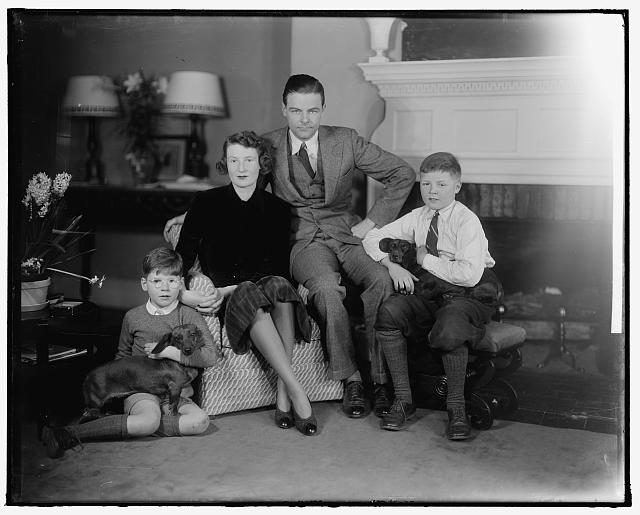
- Senator Henry Cabot Lodge, Jr., and family
- Current region: United States
- Connected families: Cabot; Frelinghuysen

The Lodge family is a prominent New England political family, and among the families who make up the "Boston Brahmins", also known as the "first families of Boston".

== History ==
The Boston Brahmin Lodge family are closely related with the Cabot family. George Cabot had a great-granddaughter named Anna Cabot (b. 1821), who married the wealthy Boston merchant John Ellerton Lodge. Their son Henry Cabot Lodge (b. 1850 in Boston) was a U.S. Senator from Massachusetts, who was reelected for the same senate seat as the incumbent 1916 U.S. Senate candidate against the Kennedy brothers' maternal grandfather, John F. Fitzgerald. The senator's grandson, Henry Cabot Lodge II (b. 1902 in Nahant) was also a U.S. Senator from Massachusetts, incumbent 1952 U.S. Senate candidate from Massachusetts against John F. Kennedy, U.S. Ambassador to United Nations, and 1960 vice presidential candidate for Richard Nixon against the Kennedy–Johnson ticket. Another grandson, John Davis Lodge (b. 1903 in Washington, D.C.), was the 64th Governor of Connecticut. The son of Henry Cabot Lodge II, George Cabot Lodge II (b. 1927), was the 1962 U.S. Senate candidate from Massachusetts against Ted Kennedy.

It became connected to other prominent families through marriage.

== Notable members ==
- John Ellerton Lodge (b. 1807), married Anna Cabot (b. 1821).
  - Henry Cabot Lodge I (b. 1850 in Boston), U.S. Senator from Massachusetts and ardent opponent of Woodrow Wilson’s League of Nations
    - George Cabot Lodge I (b. 1873 in Boston), poet
      - Henry Cabot Lodge II (b. 1902 in Nahant), U.S. Senator from Massachusetts, incumbent 1952 U.S. Senate candidate from Massachusetts against John F. Kennedy, U.S. Ambassador to United Nations, and 1960 vice presidential candidate for Richard Nixon against the Kennedy–Johnson ticket
        - George Cabot Lodge II (b. 1927), Harvard Business School professor, 1962 U.S. Senate candidate from Massachusetts against Ted Kennedy
        - Henry Sears Lodge (b. 1930)
      - John Davis Lodge (b. 1903 in Washington, D.C.), 64th governor of Connecticut
        - Lily Lodge (b. 1930), actress, acting coach and etiquette consultant

== In fiction ==
The wealthy family of Veronica Lodge, featured in Archie Comics, is named for the Lodges. In early stories she's described as being from Beacon Hill, but later stories changed her home to New York City.
