= Charles Henry Davis =

United States Navy admiral (1807–1877)

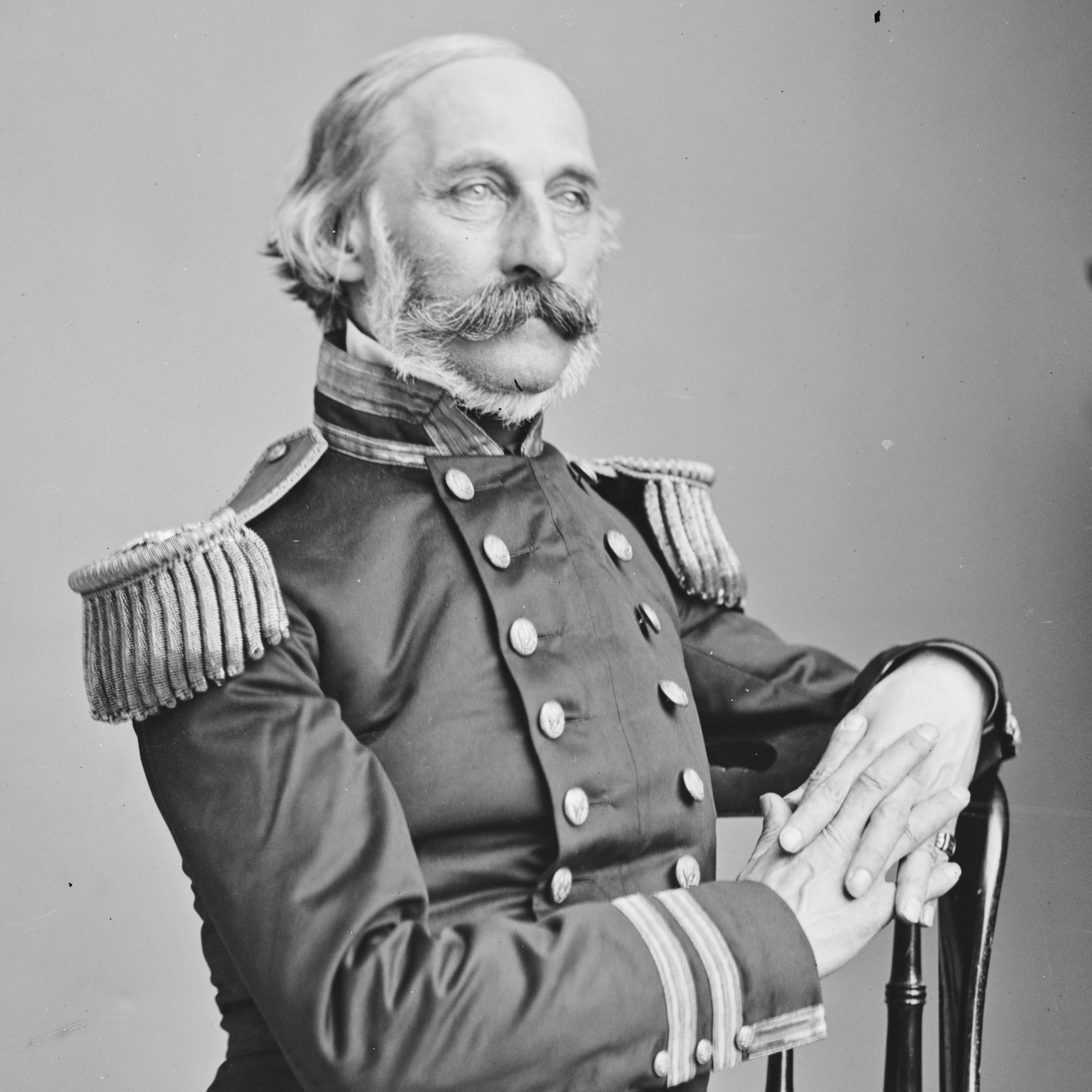
- Davis c. 1860 – c. 1870
- Born: January 16, 1807; Boston, Massachusetts, U.S.
- Died: February 18, 1877 (aged 70); Washington, D.C., U.S.
- Burial place: Cambridge, Massachusetts, U.S.
- Spouse: Harriette Blake Mills
- Relatives: Davis political family
- Military career
- Allegiance: United States
- Branch: United States Navy
- Service years: 1823–1877
- Rank: Rear admiral
- Commands: St. Mary's; Western Gunboat Flotilla; South Atlantic Squadron
- Conflicts: Filibuster War: Second Battle of Rivas; American Civil War: First Battle of Memphis

Charles Henry Davis (January 16, 1807 – February 18, 1877) was a self-educated American astronomer and rear admiral of the United States Navy. While working for the United States Coast Survey, he researched tides and currents, and located an uncharted shoal that had caused wrecks off of the coast of New York. During the American Civil War, he commanded the Western Gunboat Flotilla, where he won an important engagement in the First Battle of Memphis before capturing enemy supplies on a successful expedition up the Yazoo River. Davis was also one of the founders of the National Academy of Sciences in 1863 and he wrote several scientific books.

Historian Donald L. Miller describes Davis during the time of the Civil War as "tall, solemn-looking and contemplative, with a drooping mustache that hung over his mouth."

== Early life ==
Davis was born in Boston, the son of Daniel Davis. He attended the Boston Latin School and entered Harvard College in 1821, where he studied mathematics. But left after two years when he was appointed as a midshipman in the United States Navy on August 12, 1823.

Between 1827 and 1828, he served on board the frigate United States in the Pacific. In 1829, he was promoted to passed midshipman. From 1830 to 1833, he served on the sloop Ontario. In 1834, he was promoted to lieutenant and assigned to the Vincennes. In 1840 to 1841, he served on board the ship Independence.

In 1841, he received an honorary Bachelor of Arts degree from Harvard; in 1868, he received an honorary LL.D. from the same institution.

== Career ==
Coat of Arms of Charles Henry Davis

From 1846 to 1849, he worked in the United States Coast Survey on board the Nantucket, where he discovered a previously unknown shoal that had caused shipwrecks off the coast of New York. During his service to the Survey, he was also responsible for researching tides and currents and acted as an inspector on a number of naval shipyards. From 1849 to 1855 he was the first superintendent of American Nautical Almanac Office and produced the American Ephemeris and Nautical Almanac.

In 1854, he was promoted to commander and given the command of the St. Mary's. On April 30, 1857, he mediated with the Central American forces at San Juan del Sur, Nicaragua, the capitulation of filibuster William Walker and some 300 men, who departed in the St. Mary's for Panama the next day. In 1859, while commanding the St. Mary's, Davis was ordered to go to Baker Island to obtain samples of guano, becoming perhaps the first American to set foot there since it was annexed by the United States in 1857. The guano was necessary as fertilizer. Commodore William Mervine had previously been sent, but he did not land and believed the island to be inaccessible. (From evidence that was later found on the island, it had been visited prior to 1857 by whalers).

=== Civil War service ===
In the American Civil War, Davis was appointed to Blockade Strategy Board in June 1861. On November 15, 1861, he was promoted to captain. He was made acting flag officer, in command of the Western Gunboat Flotilla. A day after he took command, the flotilla fought a short battle with Confederate ships on the Mississippi River at Plum Point Bend on May 10, 1862. Caught unready for battle, two of the Union ships were badly damaged and had to be run into shoal water to keep from sinking. The Confederate vessels escaped with only minor damage. On June 6, his ships fought in the First Battle of Memphis, which resulted in the sinking or capture of seven of the eight Confederate ships, compared with damage to only one of the Union vessels.

In July, he came downriver from Memphis, Tennessee to cooperate with the New Orleans–based fleet of his close friend Flag Officer David G. Farragut in a failed attack on the Confederate citadel of Vicksburg, Mississippi, part of the 14-month long Vicksburg campaign. Afterwards, because of a severe outbreak of malaria among his crew which left his ships undermanned, he withdrew 160 miles north to Helena, Arkansas, which had recently been occupied by the Union Army. The withdrawal was on Davis' own authority and not under orders from Washington; this decision may have contributed to his later removal from command of the gunboats. In August, he successfully seized Confederate supplies and munitions from up the Yazoo River.

After his removal from command of the gunboat flotilla in September – Secretary of the Navy Gideon Welles admired Davis and liked him personally, but said of him that he was "more of a scholar than [a] sailor... not an energetic, driving, fighting officer, such as is wanted for rough work on the Mississippi" – he was made Chief of the Navy's Bureau of Navigation and returned to Washington, D.C..

On February 7, 1863, he was promoted to rear admiral.

=== Post-war service ===
From 1865 to 1867, he was the Superintendent of the United States Naval Observatory. In 1867, he was given command of the South Atlantic Squadron with the USS Guerriere as his flagship. In 1869, he returned home and served both on the Lighthouse Board as well as in the Naval Observatory.

== Personal life and death ==
Davis married Harriette Blake Mills, the daughter of U.S. Senator Elijah Hunt Mills. Together, they were the parents of:

- Constant Davis, an 1864 graduate of Harvard who died of tuberculosis in 1869.
- Anna Cabot Mills Davis, who married U.S. Senator Henry Cabot Lodge.
- Evelyn Davis, who married Brooks Adams, son of Charles Francis Adams Sr., grandson of President John Quincy Adams, and great-grandson of President John Adams. Brooks and Evelyn were the last of the Adams families to live at Peacefield, which was home to three previous generations of Adamses.
- Charles Henry Davis Jr., a Rear Admiral in the U.S. Navy served as Chief Intelligence Officer of the Office of Naval Intelligence from September 1889 to August 1892.

During his travels, Davis wrote about his experiences in his journal about London and Copenhagen.

In 1843, he became a member of the Massachusetts Society of the Cincinnati in succession to his grandfather Colonel Constant Freeman (1757–1824). Davis was elected as a member of the American Philosophical Society in 1852.

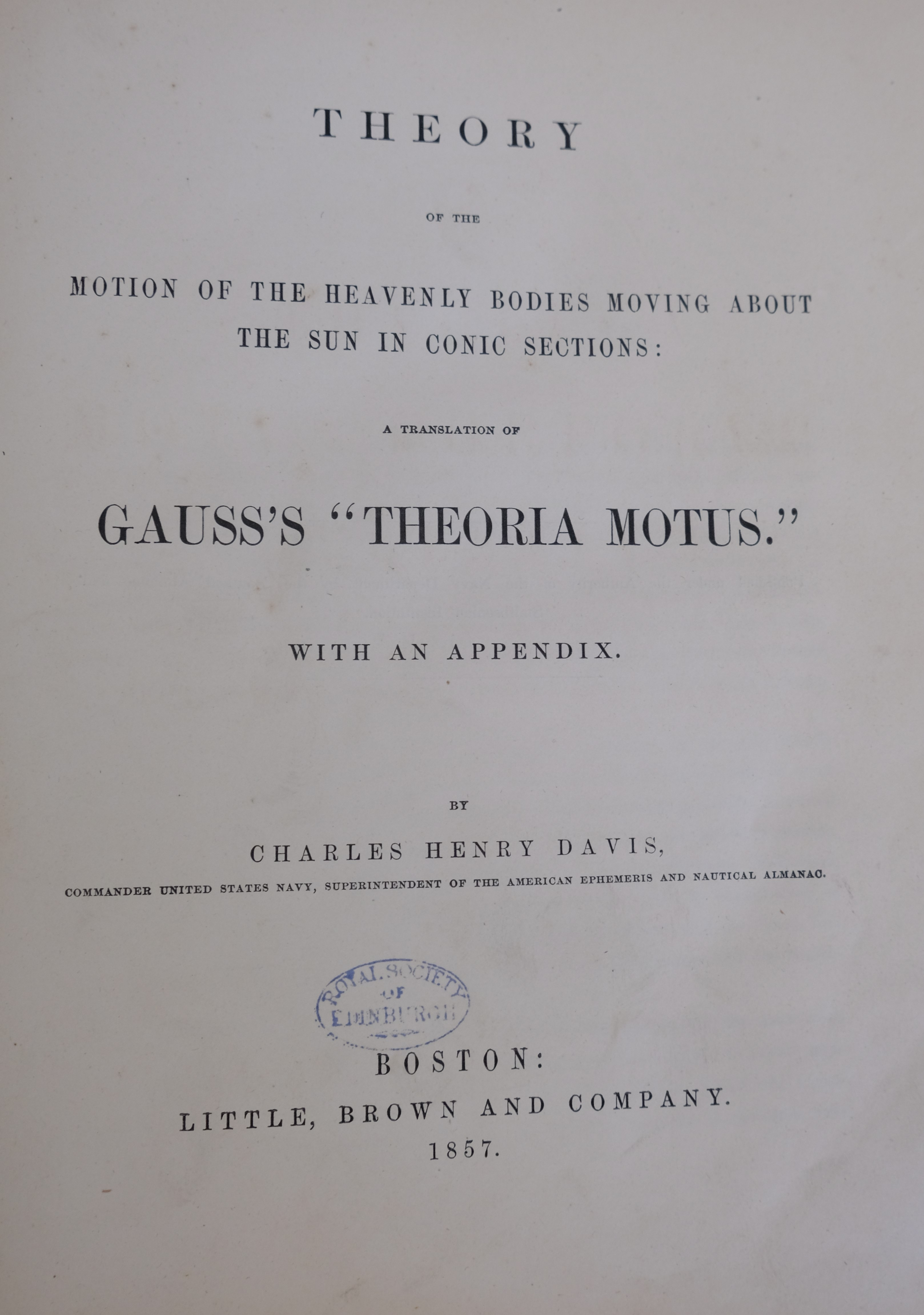
Title page to Theory of the Motion of the Heavenly Bodies Moving about the Sun in Conic Sections: A Translation of Gauss's "Theoria Motus by Carl Friedrich Gauss, translated to English by Davis (1857)

Davis translated into English Carl Friedrich Gauss's Theory of the Motion of the Heavenly Bodies Moving about the Sun in Conic Sections (1809), which was published in 1857.

After the Civil War, Davis joined the Military Order of the Loyal Legion of the United States (MOLLUS). He was a member of the New York Commandery and received insignia number 1022.

Davis died in Washington, D.C. on February 18, 1877, and is buried in Cambridge, Massachusetts.

== Namesakes ==
Several ships of the United States Navy are named in his honor: the torpedo boat USS Davis (TB-12), the destroyers USS Davis (DD-65) and USS Davis (DD-395), and the oceanographic research ship USNS Charles H. Davis (T-AGOR-5)

A species of sea anemone native to the coasts of New England and Nova Scotia, the Rhodactis davisii, is named for Davis.

== Works ==
- The Coast Survey of the United States, Metcalf, 1849.
- Remarks Upon the Establishment of an American Prime Meridian, Metcalf, 1849.
- Report on the Harbor of Charleston, From the printing office of Councell & Daggett, 1852.
- Theory of the Motion of the Heavenly Bodies moving about the Sun in Conic Sections a translation of Gauss's "Theoria Motus." With an Appendix. Little, Brown, 1857.
- Tables of Melpomene. Bureau of Ordnance and Hydrography, 1860.
- General Examination of the Pacific Ocean, E & G.W. Blunt, 1861.
- Communicates and Reports in Relation to Surveys of Boston Harbor. J.E. Farwell and Company, 1862.
- Report on interoceanic Canals and railroads between Atlantic and Pacific Oceans, G.P.O., 1867.
- General Examination of the Pacific Ocean, G.P.O., 1869.
- Narrative of the North Polar Expedition, U.S. Ship Polaris, Captain Charles Francis Hall Commanding, G.P.O., 1876.

== See also ==
- Seth Ledyard Phelps (Lieutenant-Commander who served under Davis)
- Bibliography of the American Civil War
- List of United States Navy four-star admirals
