= Elijah H. Mills =

American politician

Elijah Hunt Mills
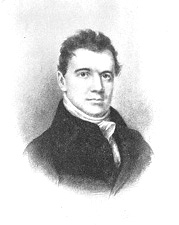

United States Senator from Massachusetts
- In office June 12, 1820 – March 3, 1827
- Preceded by: Prentiss Mellen
- Succeeded by: Daniel Webster

Member of the U.S. House of Representatives from Massachusetts's 5th district
- In office March 4, 1815 – March 3, 1819
- Preceded by: William Ely
- Succeeded by: Samuel Lathrop

Member of the Massachusetts House of Representatives
- In office 1811-1814

Personal details
- Born: Elijah Hunt Mills; December 1, 1776 Chesterfield, Massachusetts, US
- Died: May 5, 1829 (aged 52) Northampton, Massachusetts, US
- Party: Federalist
- Spouse: Harriet Blake
- Education: Williams College
- Profession: Lawyer

Elijah Hunt Mills (December 1, 1776 – May 5, 1829) was an American politician from Massachusetts.

== Early life ==
Mills was born in Chesterfield, Massachusetts. He was educated by private tutors and graduated from Williams College in 1797. Mills studied law, was admitted to the bar, and commenced practice in Northampton, Massachusetts.

== Career ==
He was the district attorney for Hampshire County, Massachusetts, and opened Northampton Law School in 1823. Mills was also a founding member of the American Antiquarian Society in 1812.

He was a member of the Massachusetts House of Representatives (1811–1814). Mills was elected as a Federalist to the United States House of Representatives (March 4, 1815 - March 3, 1819). In 1819 he returned to the Massachusetts House of Representatives, where he became Speaker of the House in 1820. He was elected to the United States Senate in 1820 to fill the vacancy caused by the resignation of Prentiss Mellen. Mills was reelected and served from June 12, 1820, to March 3, 1827. He was an unsuccessful candidate for reelection in 1826. He retired from public life due to ill health.

== Personal life ==
Mills was first married to Sarah Hunt (1780–1802), a daughter of Dr. Ebenezer Hunt and Sarah (née Bradish) Hunt, on May 16, 1802. Sarah died a few months later on October 2, 1802. Mills later married Harriet Blake (1780–1871), a daughter of merchant Joseph Blake and Deborah (née Smith) Blake. With his second wife, Mills was the father of seven children, including:

- Helen Sophia Mills (1806–1844), who married Hon. Charles Phelps Huntington.
- Sarah Hunt Mills (1808–1887), who married Prof. Benjamin Peirce, the father of Charles Sanders Peirce.
- Elijah Hunt Mills Jr. (1810–1830), who died unmarried in Charleston, South Carolina.
- Charles Henry Mills (1813–1872), a merchant who married Anna Cabot Lowell Dwight (1818–1880), a daughters of Edmund Dwight.
- William Kilby Mills (1815–1855), an invalid for the last 20 years of his life; he died unmarried.
- Harriette Blake Mills (1818–1892), who married Admiral Charles Henry Davis.
- George Francis Mills (1821–1829), who died young.

Mills died on May 5, 1829, in Northampton, and was interred in the Bridge Street Cemetery. His widow died at Cambridge on February 9, 1871.

=== Descendants ===
Through his daughter Harriette, he was a grandfather of Anna Cabot Mills Davis, who married U.S. Senator Henry Cabot Lodge. One of their sons, poet George Cabot Lodge, was the father of U.S. Senators Henry Cabot Lodge Jr. and John Davis Lodge.

U.S. House of Representatives
Preceded by William Ely	Member of the U.S. House of Representatives from Massachusetts's 5th congressional district March 4, 1815 – March 3, 1819	Succeeded by Samuel Lathrop
U.S. Senate
Preceded by Prentiss Mellen	U.S. senator (Class 1) from Massachusetts; June 12, 1820 – March 3, 1827; Served alongside: Harrison Otis, James Lloyd	Succeeded by Daniel Webster
