= 1962 United States Senate special election in Massachusetts =

- November 6, 1962
- Turnout: 81.37% (registered voters)
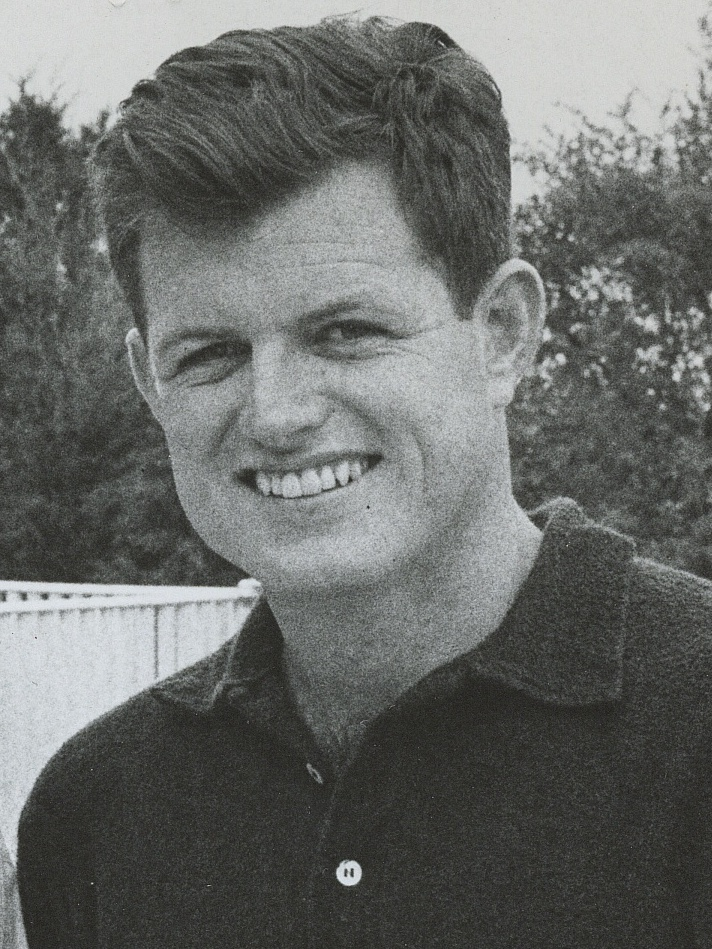

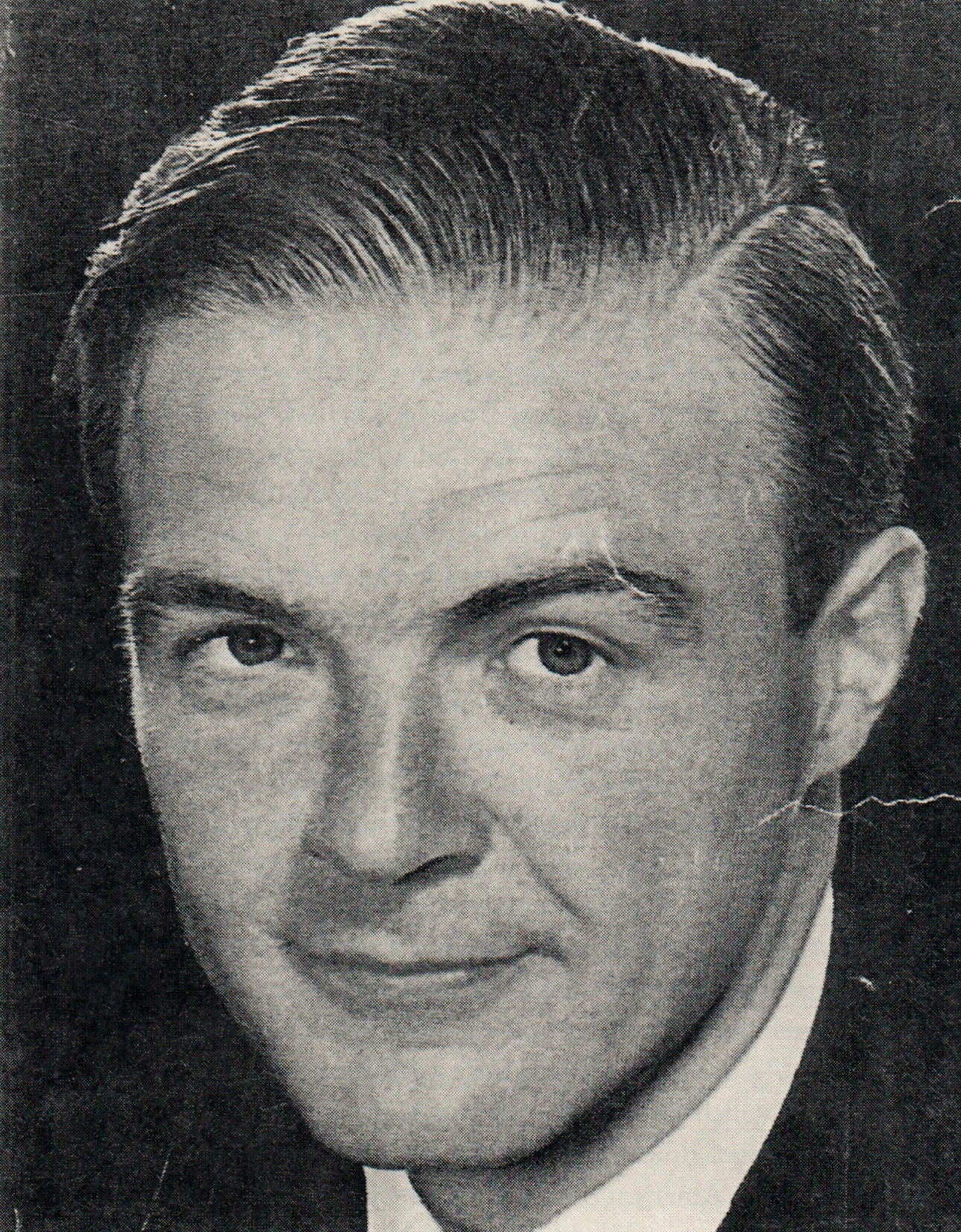
Nominee	Ted Kennedy	George C. Lodge
Party	Democratic	Republican
Popular vote	1,162,611	877,668
Percentage	55.44%	41.85%
- Kennedy: 40–50% 50–60% 60–70% 70–80% Lodge: 40–50% 50–60% 60–70% 70–80% 80–90%
U.S. senator before election
Benjamin A. Smith II
Democratic
Elected U.S. Senator
Ted Kennedy
Democratic

The 1962 United States Senate special election in Massachusetts was held on November 6, 1962. Ted Kennedy, the youngest brother of then-President John F. Kennedy, defeated George C. Lodge, the son of President Kennedy's predecessor, Henry Cabot Lodge Jr. Ted Kennedy remained a senator for 47 years, until his death in 2009.

As of 2026, Kennedy's and Lodge's combined age of 65 remains the youngest for two major candidates in a U.S. Senate election. With Harvard University professor H. Stuart Hughes, the grandson of Charles Evans Hughes, running a serious independent campaign, this election featured three of America's most prominent political families.

== Background ==
Senator John F. Kennedy of Massachusetts, a member of the Democratic Party, was elected President of the United States in November 1960. At the same time, Republicans John Volpe and Leverett Saltonstall carried Massachusetts in the elections for governor and U.S. Senate, respectively. Under the Seventeenth Amendment, the sitting state governor has the authority to temporarily fill vacancies in the Senate as soon as they arise. With Volpe scheduled to take office on January 5, 1961, the Kennedy family was compelled to engage in time-sensitive negotiations with incumbent governor Foster Furcolo about Kennedy's Senate successor.

Furcolo initially hoped to appoint himself to Kennedy's vacant seat. He was dissuaded from that under strong pressure from the Kennedys, who believed he would lose the seat in the upcoming special election. The president-elect was not only keen to maintain a Democratic presence from his home state in the Senate but under strong pressure from his father, Joe, to ensure the seat remained within the family. With a strong Democratic majority in the Senate assured in any case, the Kennedys made clear to Furcolo that they would be content to challenge whoever Volpe might have appointed to the seat in 1962 and in any event would not support any election bid by Furcolo.

It was initially speculated that Kennedy's brother Robert F. Kennedy, who had managed the presidential campaign and was the only Kennedy brother old enough to serve in the Senate, would be the family's choice. But at Joe Kennedy's insistence, and to some controversy, the president-elect nominated Robert for Attorney General of the United States. Joe Kennedy wanted his fourth son, Ted, to get the Senate seat, despite being too young. So the president-elect resigned from the Senate on December 22 and Furcolo appointed Gloucester mayor Benjamin A. Smith II, a friend and roommate of the late Joseph P. Kennedy Jr., to serve as a placeholder.

== Democratic primary ==
=== Candidates ===
==== Declared ====
- Ted Kennedy, younger brother of President John F. Kennedy and Attorney General Robert F. Kennedy
- Edward J. McCormack Jr., Massachusetts Attorney General and nephew of U.S. House speaker John W. McCormack

==== Declined ====
- Benjamin A. Smith II, incumbent Senator

=== Campaign ===
Ted Kennedy first faced a Democratic Party primary challenge from Edward J. McCormack Jr., the state Attorney General and nephew of speaker of the U.S. House John W. McCormack. McCormack had the support of many liberals and intellectuals, who thought Kennedy inexperienced ("I back Jack, but Teddy ain't ready") and knew of his suspension from Harvard, which was publicized during the race.

Kennedy's slogan was "He can do more for Massachusetts", the same one John Kennedy had used in his first campaign for the seat ten years earlier. Some asked whether with one brother the president and another the Attorney General, "Don't you think that Teddy is one Kennedy too many?". But Ted was an effective street-level campaigner.

In a televised debate, McCormack said, "The office of United States senator should be merited and not inherited", and that if his opponent's name had been Edward Moore rather than Edward Moore Kennedy his candidacy "would be a joke". A Kennedy supporter said, "McCormack was able to make a millionaire an underdog". With the public's sympathy and the family political machine, Kennedy won 69% of the vote in the September primary.

=== Convention ===
A delegate at the state Democratic convention said, "He's completely unqualified and inexperienced. And I'm going to be with him." Kennedy won on the first ballot at the convention.

=== Results ===
1962 U.S. Senate special Democratic primary
Party	Candidate	Votes	%
Democratic	Ted Kennedy	559,303	69.33%
Democratic	Edward J. McCormack, Jr.	247,403	30.67%
Write-in		26	0.00%
Total votes		806,732	100.00%
None	Blank votes	28,607	3.42%
Turnout		835,339	

== Republican primary ==
=== Candidates ===
- Laurence Curtis, U.S. representative from Newton
- George C. Lodge, U.S. assistant Secretary of Labor for international affairs and son of former U.S. senator Henry Cabot Lodge Jr.

=== Results ===
1962 U.S. Senate special Republican primary
Party	Candidate	Votes	%
Republican	George C. Lodge	244,921	55.49
Republican	Laurence Curtis	196,444	44.51
Write-in		35	0.01%
Total votes		441,400	100.00%
None	Blank votes	17,025	3.71%
Turnout		458,425	

== General election ==
=== Candidates ===
- Lawrence Gilfedder, perennial candidate (Socialist)
- H. Stuart Hughes, Harvard University historian and grandson of Charles Evans Hughes (Independent)
- Ted Kennedy, brother of President John F. Kennedy (Democratic)
- George C. Lodge, Assistant U.S. Secretary of Labor and son of former Senator Henry Cabot Lodge Jr. (Republican)
- Mark R. Shaw, perennial candidate (Prohibition)

=== Campaign ===
Well aware that he was also from a political family, and not much older than Kennedy, Lodge avoided making the sort of attacks McCormack had. Besides Kennedy and Lodge, independent candidate H. Stuart Hughes was considered a serious contender and invited to two televised debates with Lodge. (Kennedy, by then the overwhelming favorite, declined to participate.) Any chance Hughes might have had of winning the election, or even receiving widespread support, was destroyed in the aftermath of the Cuban Missile Crisis weeks before the election, in which the president and his brother Robert took the nation "to the brink" of nuclear confrontation with the Soviet Union. Hughes, who supported nuclear disarmament, suddenly seemed unrealistic and out of touch. He received just over 2% of the vote, and far fewer votes than signatures.

=== Results ===
In the general election, Kennedy defeated Lodge with 55% of the vote. Lodge's father had lost the same seat to then-Representative John F. Kennedy in 1952. Political science professor Murray Levin said Kennedy's youth and political inexperience made him an innocent outsider, while his wealth made him incorruptible. The prosecutor had become a senator, Levin said, "with one year of frantic campaigning and 30 years of experience as a Kennedy".

1962 U.S. Senate special election in Massachusetts
Party	Candidate	Votes	%	±%
Democratic	Ted Kennedy	1,162,611	55.44%	▼17.76
Republican	George C. Lodge	877,669	41.85%	▲15.62
Independent	H. Stuart Hughes	50,013	2.38%	N/A
Socialist Labor	Lawrence Gilfedder	5,330	0.25%	▼0.04
Prohibition	Mark R. Shaw	1,439	0.07%	▼0.22
Write-in		23	0.00%	
Total votes		2,097,061	100.00%	
None	Blank votes	49,966	2.33%	
Turnout		2,144,051	81.37%	
Democratic hold				
