= Henry Cabot Lodge =

American politician (1850–1924)

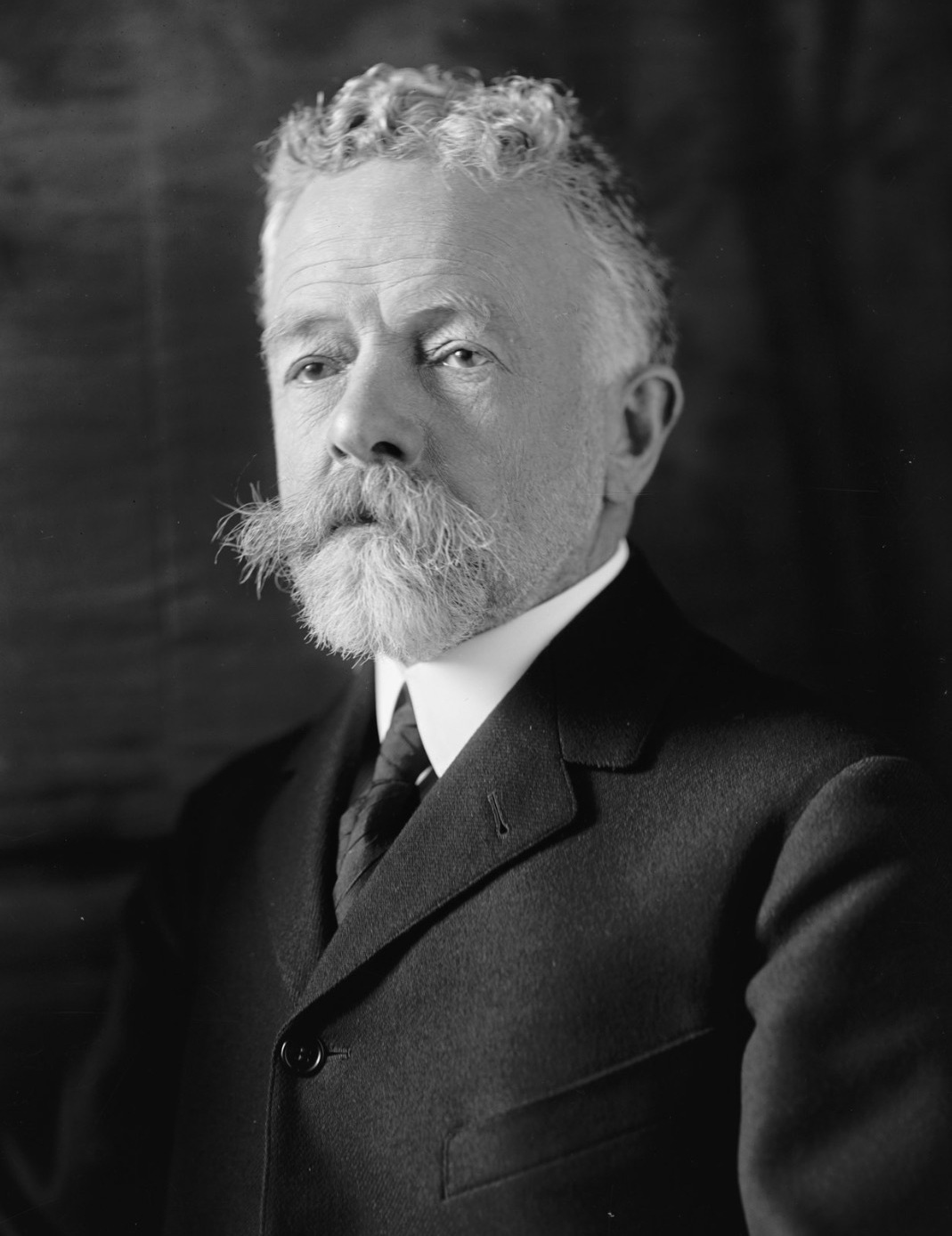
- Portrait by Harris & Ewing c. 1914–1924

United States Senator from Massachusetts
- In office March 4, 1893 – November 9, 1924
- Preceded by: Henry L. Dawes
- Succeeded by: William M. Butler
Senate positions
Chair of the Senate Foreign Relations Committee
In office May 19, 1919 – November 9, 1924
Preceded by	Gilbert Hitchcock
Succeeded by	William Borah
Senate Majority Leader
In office May 19, 1919 – November 9, 1924
Deputy	Charles Curtis
Preceded by	Position established
Succeeded by	Charles Curtis
Chairman of the Senate Republican Conference
In office August 17, 1918 – November 9, 1924
Preceded by	Jacob Harold Gallinger
Succeeded by	Charles Curtis
President pro tempore of the United States Senate
In office May 25, 1912 – May 30, 1912
Preceded by	Augustus Octavius Bacon
Succeeded by	Augustus Octavius Bacon

Member of the U.S. House of Representatives from Massachusetts's 6th district
- In office March 4, 1887 – March 3, 1893
- Preceded by: Henry B. Lovering
- Succeeded by: William Cogswell

Chair of the Massachusetts Republican Party
- In office January 31, 1883 – 1884
- Preceded by: Charles A. Stott
- Succeeded by: Edward Avery

Member of the Massachusetts House of Representatives from the 10th Essex district (Note: The 10th Essex was a three-member district composed of Nahant and several wards of the city of Lynn. Lodge served alongside Charles A. Wentworth II and Bryan Harding in his first term (1880–81) and alongside Frank D. Allen and Hartwell S. French in his second term (1881–82).)
- In office January 7, 1880 – January 3, 1882
- Preceded by: Daniel R. Pinkham; William Lyon
- Succeeded by: John Marlor

Personal details
- Born: May 12, 1850 Boston, Massachusetts, U.S.
- Died: November 9, 1924 (aged 74) Cambridge, Massachusetts, U.S.
- Party: Republican
- Spouse: Anna Cabot Mills Davis (m. 1871)
- Children: 3, including George
- Relatives: Lodge family; Cabot family
- Education: Harvard University (AB, LLB, AM, PhD)

Henry Cabot Lodge (May 12, 1850 – November 9, 1924) was an American politician, historian, lawyer, and statesman from Massachusetts. A member of the Republican Party, he served in the United States Senate from 1893 to 1924 and is best known for his positions on foreign policy. He voted in favor of American entry into World War I and his successful crusade against Woodrow Wilson's Treaty of Versailles ensured that the United States never joined the League of Nations. His penned conditions against that treaty, known collectively as the Lodge Reservations, influenced the structure of the modern United Nations.

Lodge received four degrees from Harvard University and was a widely published historian. His close friendship with Theodore Roosevelt began as early as 1884 and lasted their entire lifetimes, even surviving Roosevelt's bolt from the Republican Party in 1912.

As a representative, Lodge sponsored the unsuccessful Lodge Bill of 1890, which sought to protect the voting rights of African Americans and introduce a national secret ballot. As a senator, Lodge took a more active role in foreign policy, supporting the Spanish–American War, expansion of American territory overseas, and American entry into World War I. He also supported immigration restrictions, becoming a member of the Immigration Restriction League and influencing the Immigration Act of 1917.

After World War I, Lodge became Chairman of the Senate Committee on Foreign Relations and the leader of the Senate Republicans. From that position, he led the opposition to Wilson's Treaty of Versailles, proposing 14 reservations to the treaty. His strongest objection was to the requirement that all nations repel aggression, fearing that this would erode congressional powers and erode American sovereignty; those objections had a major role in producing the veto power of the United Nations Security Council. Lodge remained in the Senate until his death in 1924.

== Early life and education ==
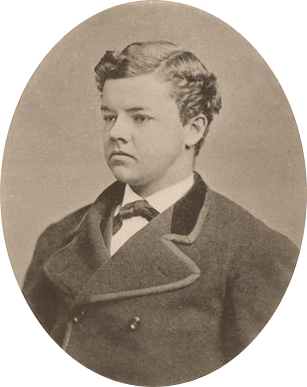
Lodge's Harvard yearbook photo, 1871

Lodge was born in Boston, Massachusetts. His father was John Ellerton Lodge of the Lodge family. His mother was Anna Cabot, a member of the Cabot family, through whom he was a great-grandson of George Cabot. Lodge was a Boston Brahmin. He grew up on Boston's Beacon Hill and spent part of his childhood in Nahant, Massachusetts, where he witnessed the 1860 kidnapping of a classmate and gave testimony leading to the arrest and conviction of the kidnappers. When the Civil War broke out in 1861, Lodge's father wanted to ride into battle at the head of a cavalry regiment he had personally put together but missed the chance, possibly due to a riding injury to the knee, and in September 1862 suddenly died. He was cousin to the American polymath Charles Peirce.

In 1872, he graduated from Harvard College, where he was a member of Delta Kappa Epsilon, the Porcellian Club, and the Hasty Pudding Club. In 1874, he graduated from Harvard Law School, and was admitted to the bar in 1875, practicing at the Boston firm now known as Ropes & Gray.

== Historian ==
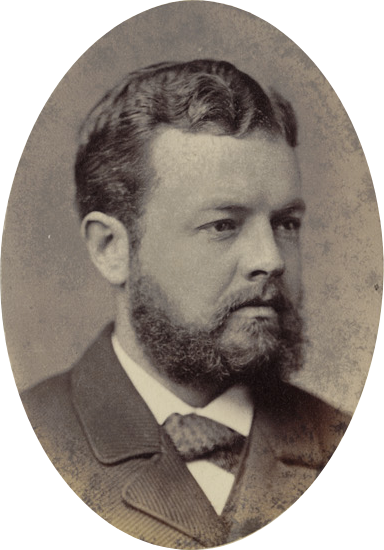
Lodge c. 1880

After traveling through Europe, Lodge returned to Harvard, and, in 1876, became one of the earliest recipients of a PhD in history from an American university. Lodge's dissertation, "The Anglo-Saxon Land Law", was published in a compilation "Essays in Anglo-Saxon Law", alongside his PhD classmates: James Laurence Laughlin on "The Anglo-Saxon Legal Procedure" and Ernest Young on "The Anglo-Saxon Family Law". All three were supervised by Henry Adams, who contributed "The Anglo-Saxon Courts of Law". Lodge maintained a lifelong friendship with Adams.

As a popular historian of the United States, Lodge focused on the early Federalist Era. He published biographies of George Washington and the prominent Federalists Alexander Hamilton, Daniel Webster, and his great-grandfather George Cabot, as well as A Short History of the English Colonies in America. In 1898, he published The Story of the Revolution in serial form in Scribner's Magazine.

Lodge was elected a Fellow of the American Academy of Arts and Sciences in 1878. In 1881, he was elected a member of the American Antiquarian Society. He was also a member of the Massachusetts Historical Society, and served as its president from 1915 to 1924. As such, Lodge penned a preface to The Education of Henry Adams (which had been written by Adams in 1905 and printed in a private edition for family and friends) when he arranged for this classic autobiography was posthumously published by the Massachusetts Historical Society in September 1918.

== Political career ==
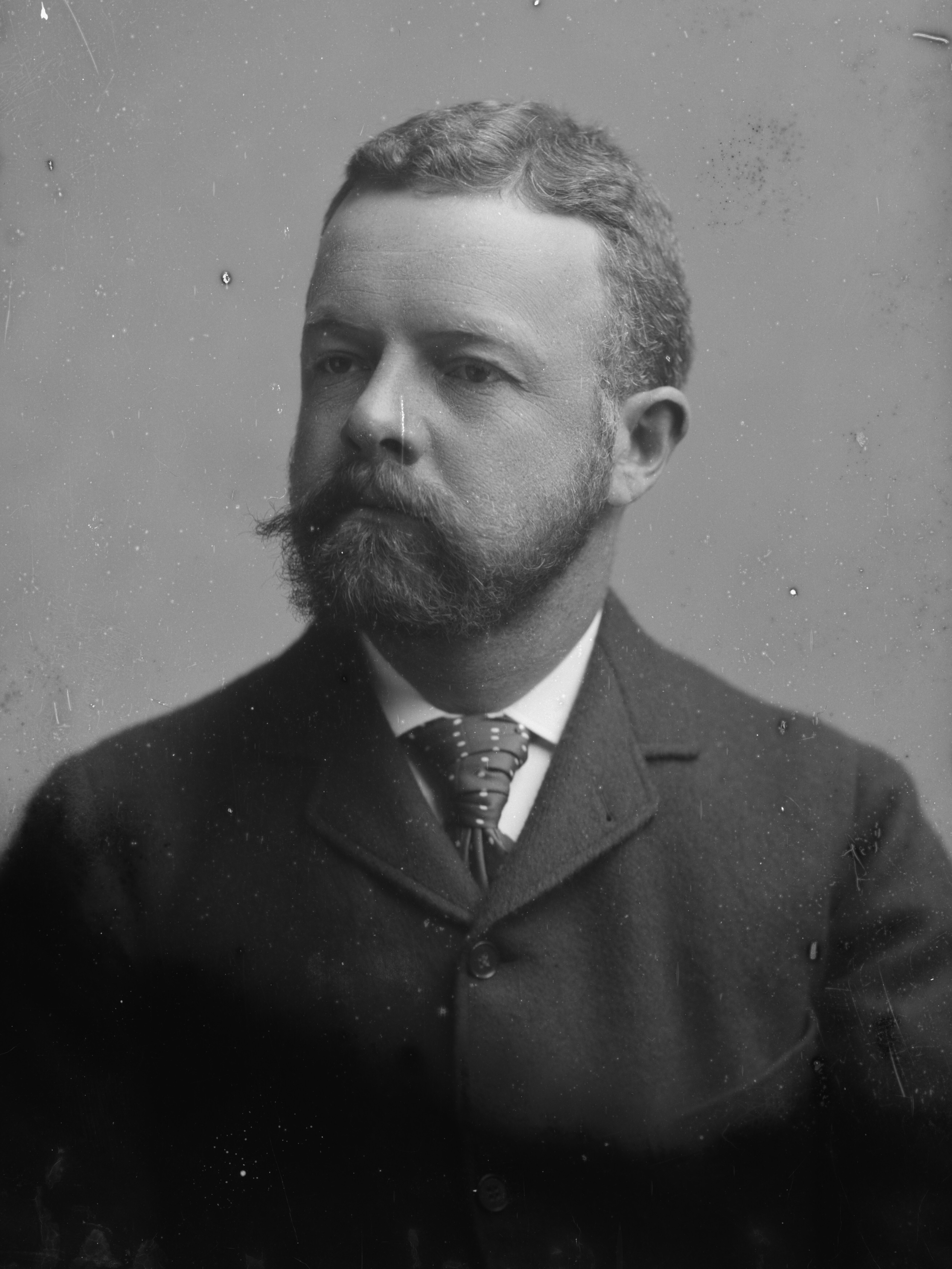
Portrait by C. M. Bell c. 1887–1890

In 1880–1882, Lodge served in the Massachusetts House of Representatives. Lodge represented his home state in the United States House of Representatives from 1887 to 1893 and in the Senate from 1893 to 1924.

Along with his close friend Theodore Roosevelt, Lodge was sympathetic to the concerns of the Mugwump faction of the Republican Party. Nonetheless, both reluctantly supported James Blaine and protectionism in the 1884 election. Blaine lost narrowly.

Lodge was first elected to the US Senate in 1892 and easily reelected time and time again but his greatest challenge came in his reelection bid in January 1911. The Democrats had made significant gains in Massachusetts and the Republicans were split between the progressive and conservative wings, with Lodge trying to mollify both sides. In a major speech before the legislature voted, Lodge took pride in his long selfless service to the state. He emphasized that he had never engaged in corruption or self-dealing. He rarely campaigned on his own behalf but now he made his case, explaining his important roles in civil service reform, maintaining the gold standard, expanding the Navy, developing policies for the Philippine Islands, and trying to restrict immigration by illiterate Europeans, as well as his support for some progressive reforms. Most of all he appealed to party loyalty. Lodge was reelected by five votes.

Lodge was very close to Theodore Roosevelt for both of their entire careers. However, Lodge was too conservative to accept Roosevelt's attacks on the judiciary in 1910, and his call for the initiative, referendum, and recall. Lodge stood silent when Roosevelt broke with the party and ran as a third-party candidate in 1912. Lodge voted for Taft instead of Roosevelt; after Woodrow Wilson won the election the Lodge-Roosevelt friendship resumed.

=== Civil rights ===
In 1890, Lodge co-authored the Federal Elections Bill, along with Senator George Frisbie Hoar, that guaranteed federal protection for African American voting rights. Although the proposed legislation was supported by President Benjamin Harrison, the bill was blocked by filibustering Democrats in the Senate.

In 1891, he became a member of the Massachusetts Society of the Sons of the American Revolution. He was assigned national membership number 4,901.

That same year, following the lynching of eleven Italian Americans in New Orleans, Lodge published an article blaming the victims and proposing new restrictions on Italian immigration.

Lodge's support for voting rights did not extend to women. He was a leading opponent of women's suffrage. Lodge did not change his position even after the junior senator from Massachusetts, John Weeks, lost his seat in 1918 due to his opposition to equal suffrage.

=== Spanish–American War ===
Lodge was a strong backer of U.S. intervention in Cuba in 1898, arguing that it was the moral responsibility of the United States to do so:

Of the sympathies of the American people, generous, liberty-loving, I have no question. They are with the Cubans in their struggle for freedom. I believe our people would welcome any action on the part of the United States to put an end to the terrible state of things existing there. We can stop it. We can stop it peacefully. We can stop it, in my judgment, by pursuing proper diplomacy and offering our good offices. Let it once be understood that we mean to stop the horrible state of things in Cuba and it will be stopped. The great power of the United States, if it is once invoked and uplifted, is capable of greater things than that.

Following American victory in the Spanish–American War, Lodge came to represent the imperialist faction of the Senate, those who called for the annexation of the Philippines. Lodge maintained that the United States needed to have a strong navy and be more involved in foreign affairs. However, Lodge was never on good terms with John Hay, who served as Secretary of State under McKinley and Roosevelt, 1898–1905. They had a bitter fight over the principle of commercial reciprocity with Newfoundland.

In a letter to Theodore Roosevelt, Lodge wrote, "Porto Rico is not forgotten and we mean to have it".

=== Alaska Boundary Dispute ===
Henry Cabot Lodge was one of the politicians involved in the Alaska Boundary Dispute during 1896–1903. The border was not clearly labelled in southeast Alaska which started a conflict between Canada and the United States. Canada wanted the Alaska Panhandle for its direct route from the Klondike Gold Rush to the Pacific and its resources, while the United States wanted it for its vital trading and shipping routes. The tribunal ultimately ruled in favor of the American position, however the presence of political figures like Lodge on it caused controversy among Canadians.

=== Immigration ===
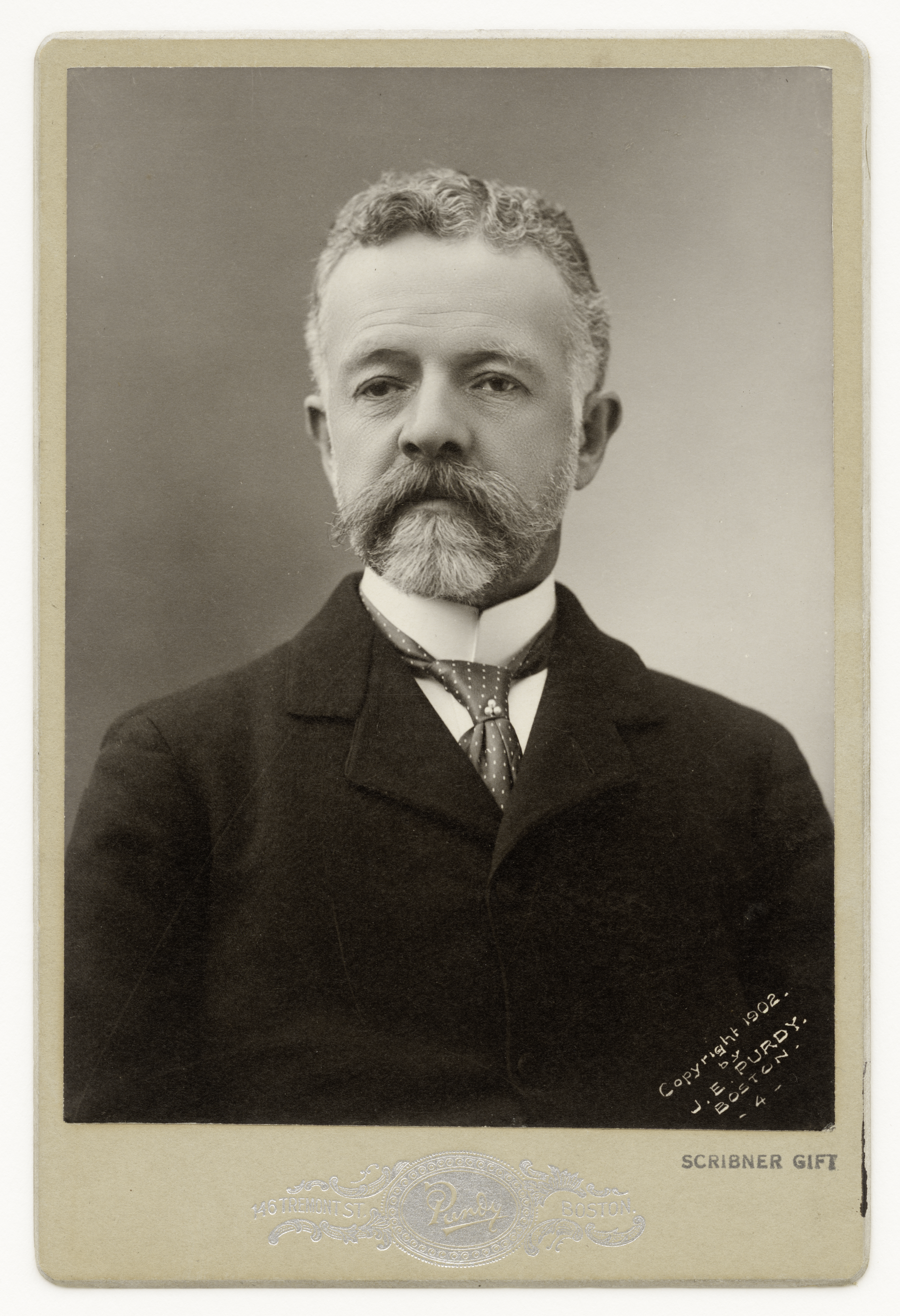
Carte de visite by James E. Purdy, 1902

Lodge was a vocal proponent of immigration restrictions, for a number of reasons. In the late 19th and early 20th centuries, significant numbers of immigrants, primarily from Eastern and Southern Europe, were migrating to industrial centers in the United States. Lodge argued that unskilled foreign labor was undermining the standard of living for American workers, and that a mass influx of uneducated immigrants would result in social conflict and national decline. In a May 1891 article on Italian immigration, Lodge expressed his concern that immigration by "the races who have peopled the United States" was declining, while "the immigration of people removed from us in race and blood" was on the rise. He considered northern Italians superior candidates for immigration to southern Italians, not only because they tended to be better educated, had a higher standard of living, and had a "higher capacity for skilled work", but because they were more "Teutonic" than their southern counterparts, whose immigration he sought to restrict.

Lodge was a supporter of "100% Americanism", a common theme in the nativist movement of the era. In an address to the New England Society of Brooklyn in 1888, Lodge stated:

Let every man honor and love the land of his birth and the race from which he springs and keep their memory green. It is a pious and honorable duty. But let us have done with British-Americans and Irish-Americans and German-Americans, and so on, and all be Americans ... If a man is going to be an American at all let him be so without any qualifying adjectives; and if he is going to be something else, let him drop the word American from his personal description.

He did not believe, however, that all races were equally capable or worthy of being assimilated. In The Great Peril of Unrestricted Immigration, he wrote that "you can take a Hindoo and give him the highest education the world can afford ... but you cannot make him an Englishman" and cautioned against the mixing of "higher" and "lower" races:

On the moral qualities of the English-speaking race, therefore, rest our history, our victories, and all our future. There is only one way in which you can lower those qualities or weaken those characteristics, and that is by breeding them out. If a lower race mixes with a higher in sufficient numbers, history teaches us that the lower race will prevail.

As the public voice of the Immigration Restriction League, Lodge argued in support of literacy tests for incoming immigrants. The tests would be designed to exclude members of those races he deemed "most alien to the body of the American people". He proposed that the United States should temporarily shut out all further entries, particularly persons of low education or skill, to more efficiently assimilate the millions who had already come. From 1907 to 1911, he served on the Dillingham Commission, a joint congressional committee established to study the era's immigration patterns and make recommendations to Congress based on its findings. The commission's recommendations led to the Immigration Act of 1917.

=== World War I ===
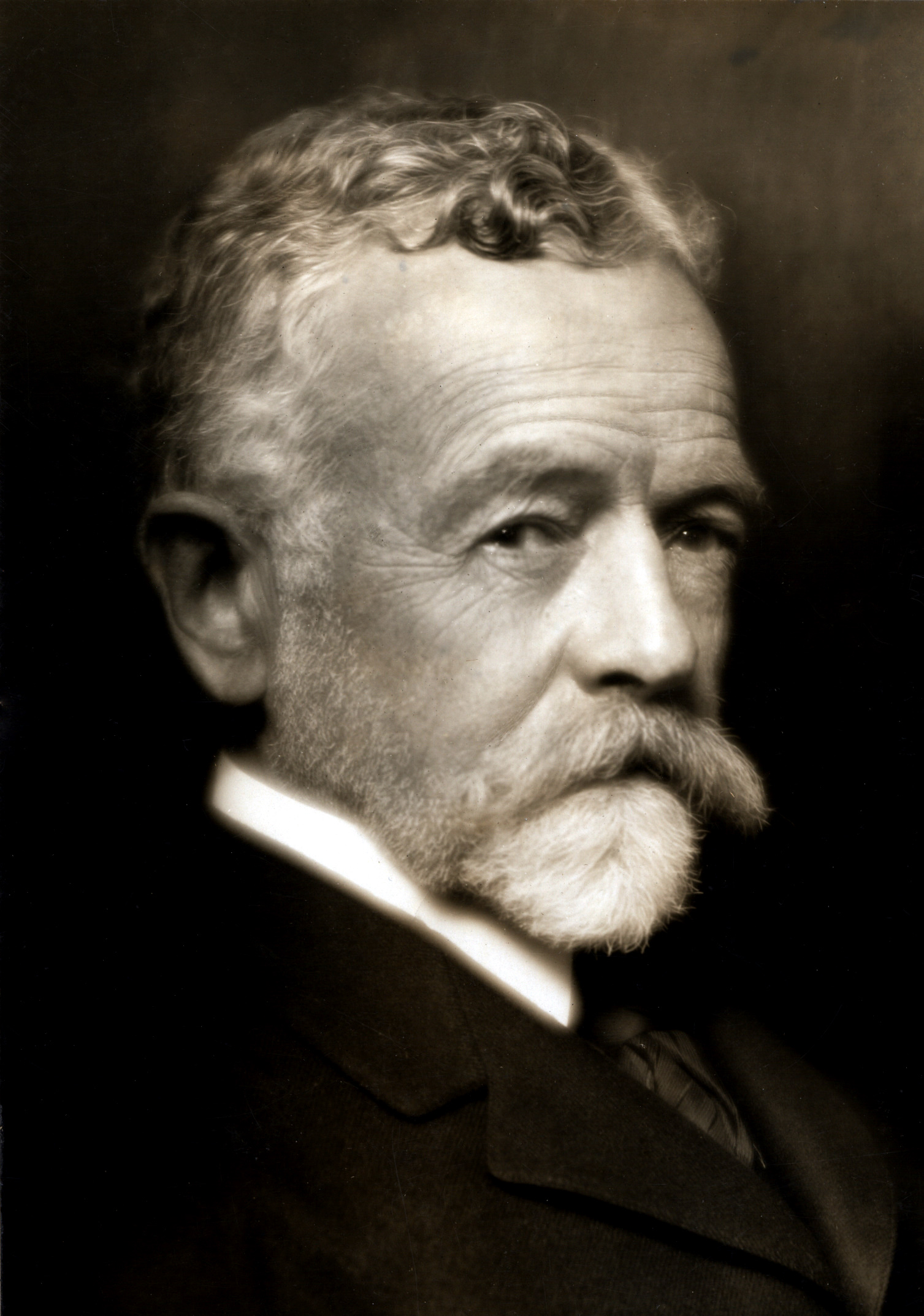
Lodge in 1916

Lodge was a staunch advocate of entering World War I on the side of the Allied Powers, attacking President Woodrow Wilson for poor military preparedness and accusing pacifists of undermining American patriotism. On April 2, 1917, the day that President Wilson urged Congress to declare war, Lodge and Alexander Bannwart, a pacifist constituent who wanted Lodge to vote against the war, got into a fistfight in the U.S. Capitol. Bannwart was arrested but Lodge opted not to press charges. Bannwart later sued Lodge to have the record corrected; initial news reports suggested that Bannwart hit Lodge first, but Lodge acknowledged in settling the lawsuit that he had hit Bannwart first. This is the only known instance of a U.S. Senator attacking a constituent.

After the United States entered the war, Lodge continued to attack Wilson as hopelessly idealistic, assailing Wilson's Fourteen Points as unrealistic and weak. He contended that Germany needed to be militarily and economically crushed and saddled with harsh penalties so that it could never again be a threat to the stability of Europe. However, apart from policy differences, even before the end of Wilson's first term and well before America's entry into the Great War, Lodge confided to Teddy Roosevelt, "I never expected to hate anyone in politics with the hatred I feel toward Wilson." In January 1921, Lodge led the deliberate obstruction of the confirmation of 10,000 presidential Wilson appointments to the War and Navy Departments in the US Senate on the grounds that confirmation of these so-called cabinet "favorite" appointments would embarrass the Harding Administration.

He served as chairman of the Senate Foreign Relations Committee (1919–1924). He also served as chairman of the Senate Republican Conference from 1918 to 1924. His leadership of the Senate Republicans has led some to retrospectively call him the de facto Senate Majority Leader. During his term in office, he and another powerful senator, Albert J. Beveridge, pushed for the construction of a new navy.

=== League of Nations ===
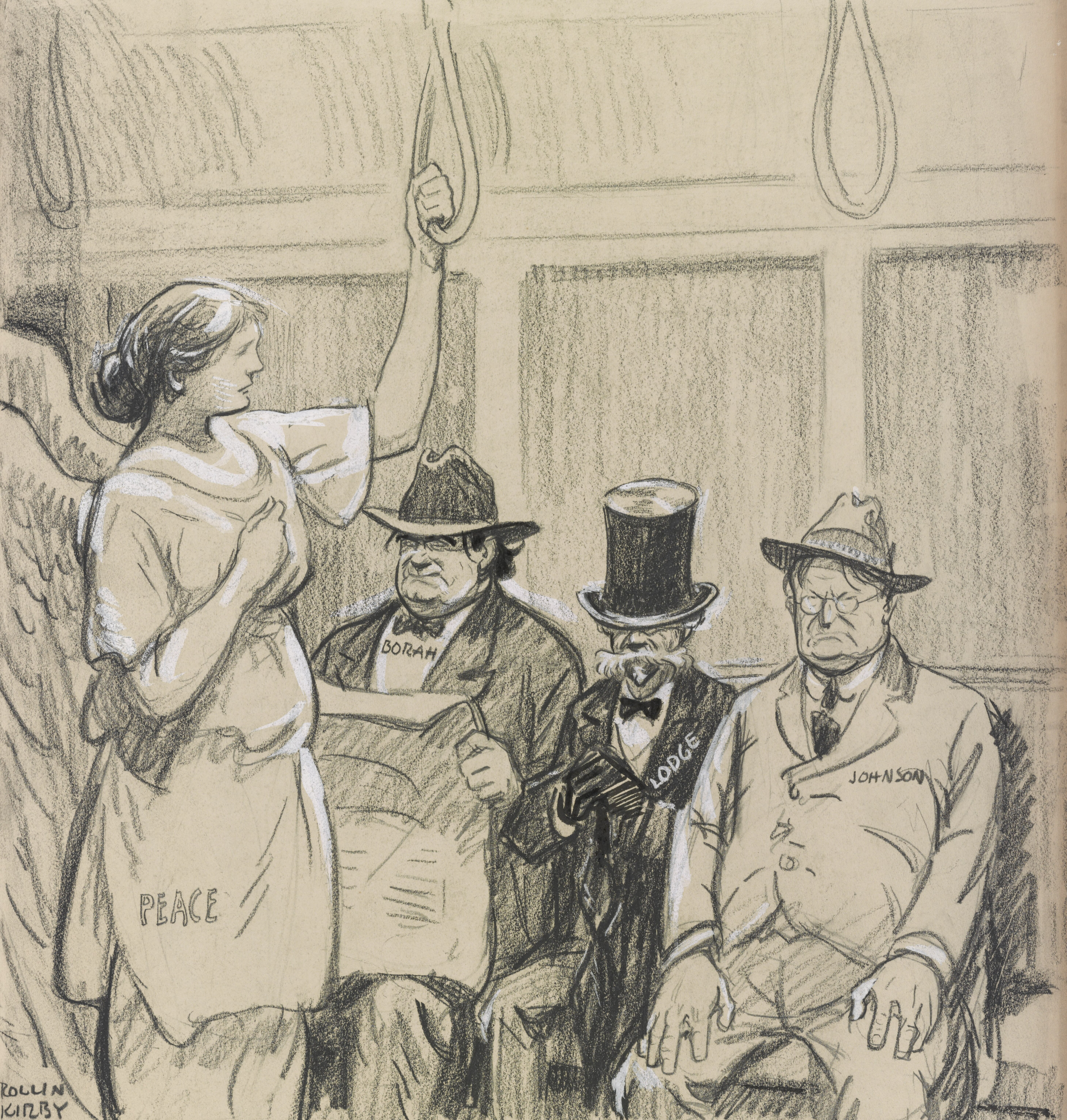
"Refusing to give the lady a seat" Cartoon by Rollin Kirby mocking senators Borah, Lodge, and Johnson for their opposition to the Treaty of Versailles c. 1919–1920

In 1919, as the unofficial Senate majority leader, Lodge dealt with the debate over the Treaty of Versailles and the Senate's ultimate rejection of the treaty. Lodge wanted to join the League of Nations, but with amendments that would protect American sovereignty.

Lodge appealed to the patriotism of American citizens by objecting to what he saw as the weakening of national sovereignty: "I have loved but one flag and I can not share that devotion and give affection to the mongrel banner invented for a league." Lodge was reluctant to involve the United States in world affairs in anything less than a pre-eminent role:

The United States is the world's best hope, but if you fetter her in the interests and quarrels of other nations, if you tangle her in the intrigues of Europe, you will destroy her power for good, and endanger her very existence. Leave her to march freely through the centuries to come, as in the years that have gone. Strong, generous, and confident, she has nobly served mankind. Beware how you trifle with your marvelous inheritance; this great land of ordered liberty. For if we stumble and fall, freedom and civilization everywhere will go down in ruin.

Lodge was also motivated by political concerns; he strongly disliked Wilson personally and was eager to find an issue for the Republican Party to run on in the presidential election of 1920.

Lodge's key objection to the League of Nations was Article X, which required all signatory nations to repel aggression of any kind if ordered to do so by the League. Lodge rejected an open-ended commitment that might subordinate the national security interests of the United States to the demands of the League. He especially insisted that Congress must approve interventions individually; the Senate could not, through treaty, unilaterally agree to enter hypothetical conflicts.

The Senate was divided into a "crazy-quilt" of positions on the Versailles question. One block of Democrats strongly supported the Treaty. A second group of Democrats, in line with President Wilson, supported the Treaty and opposed any amendments or reservations. The largest bloc, led by Lodge, comprised a majority of the Republicans. They supported a Treaty with reservations, especially on Article X. Finally, a bi-partisan group of 13 isolationist "irreconcilables" opposed a treaty in any form.

It proved possible to build a majority coalition, but impossible to build a two thirds coalition that was needed to pass a treaty. The closest the Treaty came to passage was in mid-November 1919, when Lodge and his Republicans formed a coalition with the pro-Treaty Democrats, and were close to a two-thirds majority for a Treaty with reservations, but Wilson rejected this compromise.

Cooper and Bailey suggest that Wilson's stroke on September 25, 1919, had so altered his personality that he was unable to effectively negotiate with Lodge. Cooper says the psychological effects of a stroke were profound: "Wilson's emotions were unbalanced, and his judgment was warped. ... Worse, his denial of illness and limitations was starting to border on delusion."

The Treaty of Versailles went into effect, but the United States did not sign it and made separate peace with Germany and Austria-Hungary. The United States never joined the League of Nations. Historians agree that the League was ineffective in dealing with major issues, but they debate whether American membership would have made much difference.

Lodge won a posthumous victory in the long run; his reservations were incorporated into the United Nations charter in 1945, with Article X of the League of Nations charter absent and the U.S., as a permanent member of the United Nations Security Council, given an absolute veto. Henry Cabot Lodge Jr., Lodge's grandson, served as U.S. Ambassador to the United Nations from 1953 to 1960.

=== Obstruction of Wilson's appointments ===
In January 1921, Lodge led the deliberate obstruction of the confirmation of 10,000 of President Wilson's appointments to the War and Navy Departments in the U.S. Senate on the grounds that confirmation of these so-called cabinet "favorite" appointments would embarrass the Harding Administration.

=== Washington Naval Conference ===
In 1922, President Warren G. Harding appointed Lodge as a delegate to the Washington Naval Conference (International Conference on the Limitation of Armaments), led by Secretary of State Charles Evans Hughes, and included Elihu Root and Oscar Underwood. This was the first disarmament conference in history and had a goal of world peace through arms reduction. Attended by nine nations, the United States, Japan, China, France, Great Britain, Italy, Belgium, the Netherlands, and Portugal, the conference resulted in three major treaties: Four-Power Treaty, Five-Power Treaty (more commonly known as the Washington Naval Treaty), and the Nine-Power Treaty, as well as a number of smaller agreements.

=== Lodge–Fish Resolution ===
In June 1922, he introduced the Lodge–Fish Resolution, to illustrate American support for the British policy in Palestine per the 1917 Balfour Declaration.

== Legacy ==
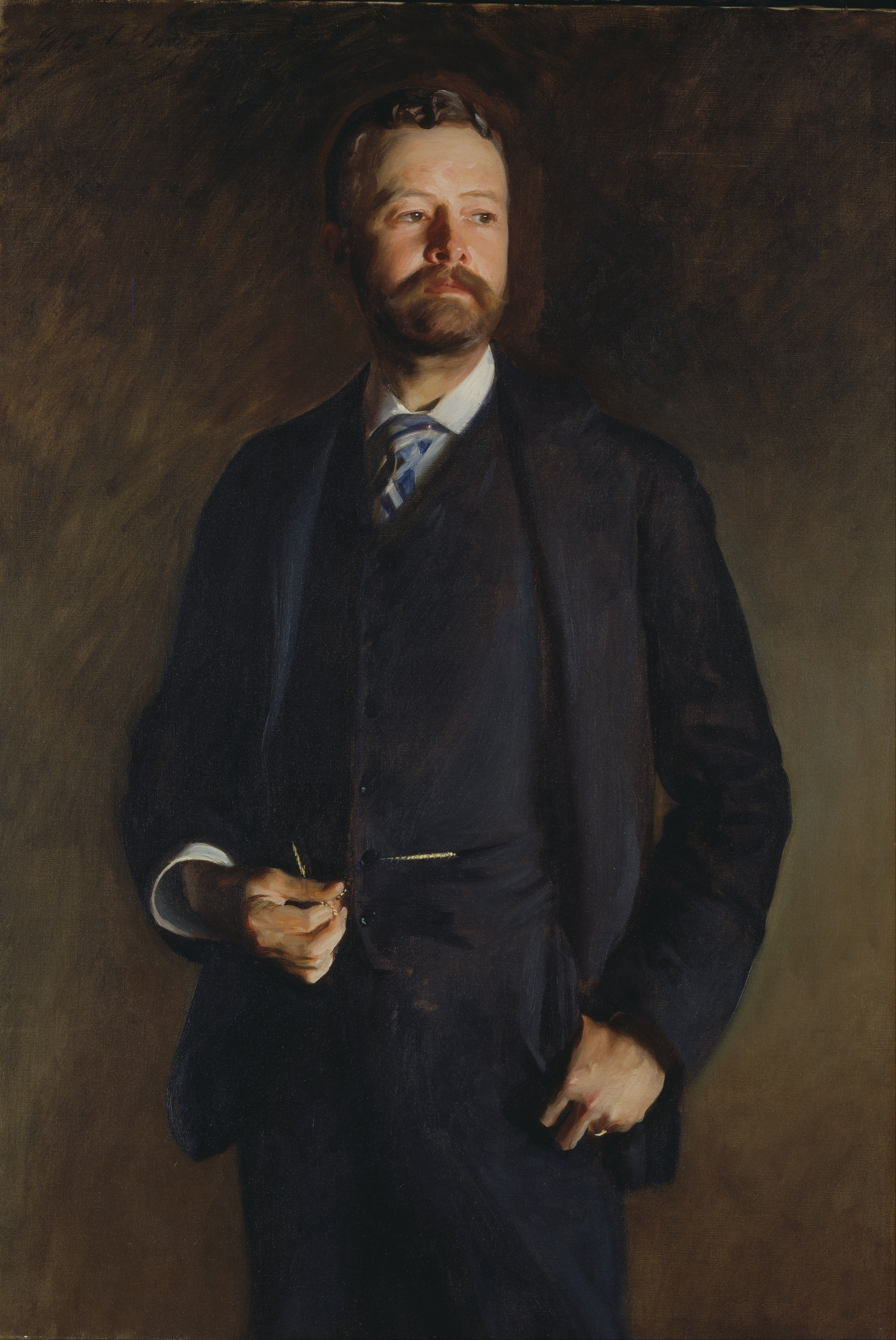
1890 portrait by John Singer Sargent

Historian George E. Mowry argues that:

Henry Cabot Lodge was one of the best informed statesmen of his time, he was an excellent parliamentarian, and he brought to bear on foreign questions a mind that was at once razor sharp and devoid of much of the moral cant that was so typical of the age. ... [Yet] Lodge never made the contributions he should have made, largely because of Lodge the person. He was opportunistic, selfish, jealous, condescending, supercilious, and could never resist calling his opponent's spade a dirty shovel. Small wonder that except for Roosevelt and Root, most of his colleagues of both parties disliked him, and many distrusted him.

Lodge served on the Board of Regents of the Smithsonian Institution for many years. His first appointment was in 1890, as a Member of the House of Representatives, and he served until his election as a senator in 1893. He was reappointed to the Board in 1905 and served until he died in 1924. The other Regents considered Lodge to be a "distinguished colleague, whose keen, constructive interest in the affairs of the Institution led him to place his broad knowledge and large experience at its service at all times."

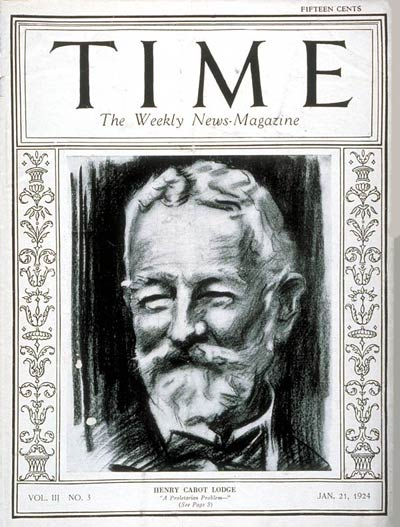
Time Cover, January 21, 1924

Mount Lodge, also named Boundary Peak 166, located on the Canada–United States border in the Saint Elias Mountains was named in 1908 after him in recognition of his service as U.S. Boundary Commissioner in 1903.

Lodge was depicted by Sir Cedric Hardwicke in Darryl Zanuck's 1944 film Wilson, a biography of President Wilson.

== Personal life ==
In 1871, he married Anna "Nannie" Cabot Mills Davis, daughter of Admiral Charles Henry Davis. They had three children:

- Constance Davis Lodge (1872–1948), wife of U.S. Representative Augustus Peabody Gardner (from 1892 to 1918) and Brigadier General Clarence Charles Williams (from 1923 to 1948)
- George Cabot Lodge I (1873–1909), a noted poet and politician. George's sons, Henry Cabot Lodge Jr. (1902–1985) and John Davis Lodge (1903–1985), also became politicians.
- John Ellerton Lodge II (1876–1942), an art curator.

On November 5, 1924, Lodge suffered a severe stroke while recovering in the hospital from surgery for gallstones. He died four days later at the age of 74. He was interred in the Mount Auburn Cemetery in Cambridge, Massachusetts.

== Publications ==
=== Books written by Lodge ===
- 1877. Life and Letters of George Cabot. Little, Brown.
- 1880. Ballads and Lyrics, Selected and Arranged by Henry Cabot Lodge. Houghton Mifflin (1882 reissue contains a Preface by Lodge)
- 1881. A Short History of the English Colonies in America. Harper & Bros.
- 1882. Alexander Hamilton. Houghton Mifflin (American Statesmen Series).
- 1884, "Studies in History", Houghton Mifflin
- 1883. Daniel Webster. Houghton Mifflin (American Statesmen Series).
- 1887. Alexander Hamilton. Houghton Mifflin (American Statesmen Series).
- 1889. George Washington. (2 volumes). Houghton Mifflin (American Statesmen series).
- 1891. Boston. Longmans, Green, and Co. (Historic Towns series).
- 1892. Speeches. Houghton Mifflin.
- 1895. Hero Tales from American History. With Theodore Roosevelt. Century.
- 1898. The Story of the Revolution. (2 volumes). Charles Scribner's Sons.
- 1899. The War With Spain. Harper & Brothers.
- 1902. A Fighting Frigate, and Other Essays and Addresses. Charles Scribner's Sons.
- 1906. A Frontier Town and Other Essays. Charles Scribner's Sons.
- 1909. Speeches and Addresses: 1884–1909. Houghton Mifflin.
- 1913. Early Memories. Charles Scribner's Sons.
- 1915. The Democracy of the Constitution, and Other Addresses and Essays. Charles Scribner's Sons.
- 1917. War Addresses, 1915-1917. Houghton Mifflin.
- 1919. Address of Senator Henry Cabot Lodge of Massachusetts in Honor of Theodore Roosevelt, Ex-President of the United States, before the Congress of the United States Sunday, February 9, 1919. Washington, D.C.: Government Printing Office.
- 1919. Theodore Roosevelt, Boston: Houghton Mifflin.
- 1921. The Senate of the United States and Other Essays and Addresses, Historical and Literary. Charles Scribner's Sons.
- 1925. The Senate and the League of Nations. Charles Scribner's Sons.
- 1925. Selections from the Correspondence of Theodore Roosevelt and Henry Cabot Lodge, 1884–1918 (2 vol.). With Theodore Roosevelt.

=== Book chapters written by Lodge ===
- 1898. "The Great Peril of Unrestricted Immigration". The New Century Speaker for School and College. Ginn. 1898. pp. 177–179.

=== Book series edited by Lodge ===
- 1903. The Works of Alexander Hamilton. 12 vol.
- 1910. The History of Nations. Chicago: H. W. Snow, 1901; New York: P. F. Collier & Son, 1913. (also posthumous editions, 1928 and 1939)
  - 1916. Rome. New York : P.F. Collier & Son, 1916.
- 1909. The Best of the World's Classics, Restricted to Prose. (10 volumes). With Francis Whiting Halsey. Funk & Wagnalls.

=== Articles ===
- 1878. "Timothy Pickering" (PDF). The Atlantic. June 1878. pp. 740–756.
- 1882. "Daniel Webster" (PDF). The Atlantic. February 1882. pp. 228–243.
- 1882. "Naval Courts-Martial and the Pardoning Power" (PDF). The Atlantic. July 1882. pp. 43–51.
- 1883. "Colonialism in the United States" (PDF). The Atlantic. May 1883. pp. 612–626.
- 1890. "International Copyright" (PDF). The Atlantic. August 1890. pp. 264–271.
- 1891. "Lynch Law and Unrestricted Immigration". The North American Review. 152 (414): 602–612. May 1891.

== See also ==
- List of Harvard University politicians
- Lodge Committee

== Explanatory notes ==
U.S. House of Representatives
Preceded by Henry B. Lovering	Member of the U.S. House of Representatives from Massachusetts's 6th congressional district 1887–1893	Succeeded by William Cogswell
U.S. Senate
Preceded by Henry L. Dawes	U.S. Senator (Class 1) from Massachusetts; 1893–1924; Served alongside: George Hoar, Winthrop Crane, John Weeks, David Walsh	Succeeded by William M. Butler
Preceded by David B. Hill	Chair of the Senate Immigration Committee; 1895–1899	Succeeded by Boies Penrose
Preceded by Eugene Hale	Chair of the Senate Printing Committee; 1897–1899	Succeeded by Thomas C. Platt
New office	Chair of the Senate Philippines Committee; 1899–1911	Succeeded by Simon Guggenheim
Preceded by Augustus Octavius Bacon	Chair of the Senate Private Land Claims Committee; 1913–1919	Succeeded by Charles Allen Culberson
Preceded by Gilbert Hitchcock	Chair of the Senate Foreign Relations Committee; 1919–1924	Succeeded by William Borah
New office	Senate Majority Leader; 1920–1924	Succeeded by Charles Curtis
Political offices
Preceded by Augustus Octavius Bacon	President pro tempore of the U.S. Senate; 1912	Succeeded by Augustus Octavius Bacon
Party political offices
First	Republican nominee for U.S. Senator from Massachusetts (Class 1); 1916, 1922	Succeeded by William M. Butler
New office	Senate Republican Leader; 1918–1924	Succeeded by Charles Curtis
Preceded by Jacob Harold Gallinger	Chair of the Senate Republican Conference; 1918–1924	Succeeded by Charles Curtis
Preceded by Warren G. Harding	Keynote Speaker of the Republican National Convention; 1920	Succeeded by Theodore E. Burton
Honorary titles
Preceded by Jacob Harold Gallinger	Dean of the U.S. Senate; 1918–1924	Succeeded by Francis E. Warren
Awards and achievements
Preceded by William Lawrence	Cover of Time; January 21, 1924	Succeeded by Herbert B. Swope
