= List of elections in 1948 =

The following elections occurred in the year 1948.

== Africa ==
- 1948 Mauritian general election
- 1948 South African general election
- 1948 Southern Rhodesian general election

== Asia ==
- 1948 Iraqi parliamentary election
- 1948 Lebanese presidential election
- 1948 North Korean parliamentary election
- 1948 Republic of China legislative election
- 1948 Republic of China presidential election
- 1948 Siamese general election
- 1948 Singaporean general election
- 1948 South Korean general election
- 1948 South Korean presidential election
- 1948 Syrian presidential election

== Europe ==
- 1948 Czechoslovak parliamentary election
- 1948 Czechoslovak presidential election
- 1948 Finnish parliamentary election
- Germany: 1948 West Berlin state election
- 1948 Irish general election
- 1948 Italian general election
- 1948 Italian presidential election
- 1948 Liechtenstein local elections
- 1948 Luxembourg general election
- Netherlands: general election
- 1948 Romanian parliamentary election
- 1948 Swedish general election
- 1948 Slovak parliamentary election

=== United Kingdom ===
- 1948 Armagh by-election
- 1948 Brigg by-election
- 1948 Croydon North by-election
- 1948 Edmonton by-election
- 1948 Glasgow Camlachie by-election
- 1948 Glasgow Gorbals by-election
- 1948 Glasgow Hillhead by-election
- 1948 Paisley by-election
- 1948 Southwark Central by-election
- 1948 Stirling and Falkirk by-election
- 1948 Wigan by-election

== North America ==
- 1948 Costa Rican Constituent Assembly election
- 1948 Costa Rican general election
- 1948 Guatemalan parliamentary election
- 1948 Honduran general election
- 1948 Panamanian general election

=== Canada ===
- 1948 Alberta general election
- 1948 Edmonton municipal election
- 1948 Liberal Party of Canada leadership election
- 1948 New Brunswick general election
- 1948 Newfoundland referendums
- 1948 Ontario general election
- 1948 Ottawa municipal election
- 1948 Quebec general election
- 1948 Saskatchewan general election
- 1948 Toronto municipal election

=== Caribbean ===
- 1948 Cuban general election

=== United States ===
- 1948 New York state election
- 1948 United States elections
- 1948 United States presidential election

==== United States lieutenant gubernatorial ====
- 1948 Connecticut lieutenant gubernatorial election
- 1948 Delaware lieutenant gubernatorial election
- 1948 Georgia lieutenant gubernatorial special election
- 1948 Illinois lieutenant gubernatorial election
- 1948 Louisiana lieutenant gubernatorial election
- 1948 Minnesota lieutenant gubernatorial election
- 1948 Missouri lieutenant gubernatorial election
- 1948 Nebraska lieutenant gubernatorial election
- 1948 North Carolina lieutenant gubernatorial election
- 1948 Wisconsin lieutenant gubernatorial election

==== United States gubernatorial ====
- 1948 Arizona gubernatorial election
- 1948 Arkansas gubernatorial election
- 1948 Colorado gubernatorial election
- 1948 Connecticut gubernatorial election
- 1948 Delaware gubernatorial election
- 1948 Florida gubernatorial election
- 1948 Georgia gubernatorial special election
- 1948 Illinois gubernatorial election
- 1948 Indiana gubernatorial election
- 1948 Iowa gubernatorial election
- 1948 Kansas gubernatorial election
- 1948 Louisiana gubernatorial election
- 1948 Maine gubernatorial election
- 1948 Massachusetts gubernatorial election
- 1948 Michigan gubernatorial election
- 1948 Minnesota gubernatorial election
- 1948 Missouri gubernatorial election
- 1948 Montana gubernatorial election
- 1948 Nebraska gubernatorial election
- 1948 New Hampshire gubernatorial election
- 1948 New Mexico gubernatorial election
- 1948 North Carolina gubernatorial election
- 1948 North Dakota gubernatorial election
- 1948 Ohio gubernatorial election
- 1948 Oregon gubernatorial special election
- 1948 Rhode Island gubernatorial election
- 1948 South Dakota gubernatorial election
- 1948 Tennessee gubernatorial election
- 1948 Texas gubernatorial election
- 1948 United States gubernatorial elections
- 1948 Utah gubernatorial election
- 1948 Vermont gubernatorial election
- 1948 Washington gubernatorial election
- 1948 West Virginia gubernatorial election
- 1948 Wisconsin gubernatorial election

==== United States House of Representatives ====
- 1948 United States House of Representatives elections
- 1948 United States House of Representatives election in Wyoming

==== United States Senate ====
- 1948 United States Senate elections
- 1948 United States Senate election in Alabama
- 1948 United States Senate election in Colorado
- 1948 United States Senate election in Georgia
- 1948 United States Senate election in Idaho
- 1948 United States Senate election in Illinois
- 1948 United States Senate election in Iowa
- 1948 United States Senate election in Kansas
- 1948 United States Senate election in Kentucky
- 1948 United States Senate election in Louisiana
- 1948 United States Senate election in Maine
- 1948 United States Senate election in Massachusetts
- 1948 United States Senate election in Michigan
- 1948 United States Senate election in Minnesota
- 1948 United States Senate election in Montana
- 1948 United States Senate election in Nebraska
- 1948 United States Senate election in New Hampshire
- 1948 United States Senate election in New Jersey
- 1948 United States Senate election in New Mexico
- 1948 United States Senate elections in North Carolina
- 1948 United States Senate election in Oklahoma
- 1948 United States Senate election in South Carolina
- 1948 United States Senate election in South Dakota
- 1948 United States Senate election in Tennessee
- 1948 United States Senate election in Texas
- 1948 United States Senate election in Virginia
- 1948 United States Senate election in Wyoming

== South America ==
- 1948 Argentine legislative election
- 1948 Argentine Constituent Assembly election
- 1948 Ecuadorian presidential election
- 1948 Venezuelan municipal elections

== Oceania ==
=== Australia ===
- 1948 Australian referendum
- 1948 Boulder state by-election
- 1948 Coogee state by-election
- 1948 Guildford-Midland state by-election
- 1948 Kogarah state by-election
- 1948 Tasmanian state election

== See also ==
- Category:1948 elections
