= 1948 United States gubernatorial elections =

- November 2, 1948; September 13, 1948 (ME)

33 governorships (Note: Including special elections in Georgia and Oregon.)
	Majority party	Minority party
Party	Democratic	Republican
Seats before	24	24
Seats after	30	18
Seat change	▲6	▼6
Seats up	14	19
Seats won	20	13
- Democratic hold Democratic gain Republican hold Republican gain No election

United States gubernatorial elections were held in 1948, in 33 states, concurrent with the House, Senate elections and presidential election, on November 2, 1948. Elections took place on September 13 in Maine.

This was the last time Connecticut elected its governors to 2-year terms, switching to 4-year terms from the 1950 election.

== Race summary ==
State	Governor	Party	First elected	Status	Candidates
Arizona	Dan Edward Garvey	Democratic	1948 (Note: Garvey became governor on May 25, 1948, after predecessor (Sidney Preston Osborn died.))	Incumbent re-elected.	▌ ✓ Dan Edward Garvey (Democratic) 59.2%; ▌ Bruce Brockett (Republican) 40.1%; ▌ Ernest Fohle (Prohibition) 0.8%
Arkansas	Benjamin T. Laney	Democratic	1944	Incumbent retired. Democratic hold.	▌ ✓ Sid McMath (Democratic) 89.4%; ▌ Charles R. Black (Republican) 10.7%
Colorado	William Lee Knous	Democratic	1946	Incumbent re-elected.	▌ ✓ William Lee Knous (Democratic) 66.3%; ▌ David A. Hamil (Republican) 33.7%
Connecticut	James C. Shannon	Republican	1948 (Note: Shannon became governor on March 7, 1948, after predecessor (James L. McConaughy) died.)	Incumbent lost re-election. Democratic gain.	▌ ✓ Chester Bowles (Democratic) 49.31%; ▌ James C. Shannon (Republican) 49.00%; ▌ Jasper McLevy (Socialist) 1.45%; ▌ Joseph Mackay (Socialist Labor) 0.16%; ▌ Morris Chertov (Socialist Workers) 0.09%
Delaware	Walter W. Bacon	Republican	1940	Incumbent term-limited. Democratic gain.	▌ ✓ Elbert N. Carvel (Democratic) 53.7%; ▌Hyland P. George (Republican) 46.3%
Florida	Millard Caldwell	Democratic	1944	Incumbent term-limited. Democratic hold.	▌ ✓ Fuller Warren (Democratic) 83.4%; ▌ Bert L. Acker (Republican) 16.6%
Georgia (special election)	Melvin E. Thompson	Democratic	1947 (Note: Thompson became governor in 1947 after the Supreme Court of Georgia ruled that as the newly elected lieutenant governor, Thompson was the legitimate successor following the death of governor-elect Eugene Talmadge. Due to vagueness in the Georgia State Constitution, outgoing governor Ellis Arnall continued to be governor until the Supreme Court ruled him invalid.)	Incumbent lost renomination. Democratic hold.	▌ Herman Talmadge (Democratic) 97.5%; ▌ Morgan Blake (Independent) 2.2%; ▌ James Barfoot (Independent) 0.18%; ▌ Melvin E. Thompson (Independent) 0.09%
Illinois	Dwight H. Green	Republican	1940	Incumbent lost re-election. Democratic gain.	▌ ✓ Adlai Stevenson II (Democratic) 57.1%; ▌ Dwight H. Green (Republican) 42.6%; ▌ Willis R. Wilson (Prohibition) 0.24%; ▌ Louis Fisher (Socialist Labor) 0.07%
Indiana	Ralph F. Gates	Republican	1944	Incumbent term-limited. Democratic gain.	▌ ✓ Henry F. Schricker (Democratic) 53.6%; ▌ Hobart Creighton (Republican) 45.1%; ▌ Clinton W. Speicher (Prohibition) 0.8%; ▌ Walter Frisbie (Progressive) 0.4%; ▌ William Rabe (Socialist) 0.1%; ▌ Martin Ginsberg (Socialist Labor) 0.04%
Iowa	Robert D. Blue	Republican	1944	Incumbent lost renomination. Republican hold.	▌ ✓ William S. Beardsley (Republican) 55.7%; ▌ Carroll O. Switzer (Democratic) 43.7%; ▌ C.E. Bierderman (Progressive) 0.36%; ▌Marvin Galbreath (Prohibition) 0.25%; ▌ William F. Leonard (Socialist) 0.05%
Kansas	Frank Carlson	Republican	1946	Incumbent re-elected.	▌ ✓ Frank Carlson (Republican) 57.0%; ▌ Randolph Carpenter (Democratic) 40.4%; ▌ N.W. Nice (Prohibition) 2.2%; ▌ W.W. Tamplin (Socialist) 0.3%
Maine	Horace Hildreth	Republican	1944	Incumbent retired. Republican hold.	▌ ✓ Frederick G. Payne (Republican) 65.6%; ▌ Louis Lausier (Democratic) 34.4%
Massachusetts	Robert F. Bradford	Republican	1946	Incumbent lost re-election. Democratic gain.	▌ ✓ Paul A. Dever (Democratic) 59.0%; ▌ Robert F. Bradford (Republican) 40.5%; ▌Horace I. Hillis (Socialist Labor) 0.4%; ▌Mark R. Shaw (Prohibition) 0.1%
Michigan	Kim Sigler	Republican	1946	Incumbent lost re-election. Democratic gain.	▌ ✓ G. Mennen Williams (Democratic) 53.4%; ▌ Kim Sigler (Republican) 45.7%; ▌Gordon Phillips (Prohibition) 0.7%; ▌Emanuel Seidler (Socialist) 0.1%; ▌Arthur Chenoweth (Socialist Labor) 0.07%; ▌Howard Lerner (Socialist Workers) 0.04
Minnesota	Luther Youngdahl	Republican	1946	Incumbent re-elected.	▌ ✓ Luther Youngdahl (Republican) 53.2%; ▌ Charles Halsted (DFL) 45.1%; ▌Orville E. Olson (Prohibition) 1.2%; ▌Rudolph Gustafson (Socialist Labor) 0.6%
Missouri	Phil M. Donnelly	Democratic	1944	Incumbent term-limited. Democratic hold.	▌ ✓ Forrest Smith (Democratic) 57.0%; ▌ Murray Thompson (Republican) 42.8%; ▌ Robert B. Logsdon (Progressive) 0.18%; ▌ Ralph E. Gipe (Socialist) 0.07%; ▌ Henry W. Genck (Socialist Labor) 0.01%
Montana	Sam C. Ford	Republican	1940	Incumbent lost re-election. Democratic gain.	▌ ✓ John W. Bonner (Democratic) 55.7%; ▌ Sam C. Ford (Republican) 43.9%; ▌Leverne Hamilton (Socialist) 0.4%
Nebraska	Val Peterson	Republican	1946	Incumbent re-elected.	▌ ✓ Val Peterson (Republican) 60.1%; ▌ Frank Sorrell (Democratic) 39.9%
New Hampshire	Charles M. Dale	Republican	1944	Incumbent retired. Republican hold.	▌ ✓ Sherman Adams (Republican) 52.2%; ▌ Herbert W. Hill (Democratic) 47.3%; ▌ Irma J. Otto (Progressive) 0.5%
New Mexico	Thomas J. Mabry	Democratic	1946	Incumbent re-elected.	▌ ✓ Thomas J. Mabry (Democratic) 54.7%; ▌ Manuel Lujan Sr. (Republican) 45.3%
North Carolina	R. Gregg Cherry	Democratic	1944	Incumbent term-limited. Democratic hold.	▌ ✓ W. Kerr Scott (Democratic) 73.2%; ▌ George M. Pritchard (Republican) 26.4%; ▌ Mary Price (Progressive) 0.4%
North Dakota	Fred G. Aandahl	Republican	1944	Incumbent re-elected.	▌ ✓ Fred G. Aandahl (Republican) 61.3%; ▌ Howard I. Henry (Democratic) 37.5%; ▌ H.A. Porter (Progressive) 0.9%; ▌ George Lund (Socialist) 0.3%
Ohio	Thomas J. Herbert	Republican	1946	Incumbent lost re-election. Democratic gain.	▌ ✓ Frank Lausche (Democratic) 53.7%; ▌ Thomas J. Herbert (Republican) 46.3%
Oregon (special election)	John Hubert Hall	Republican	1947 (Note: Hall became governor after predecessor (Earl Snell), Senate president Marshall E. Cornett, and secretary of state Robert S. Farrell Jr. were all killed in a plane crash.)	Incumbent lost renomination. Republican hold.	▌ ✓ Douglas McKay (Republican) 53.2%; ▌ Lew Wallace (Democratic) 44.5%; ▌ Wendell E. Barnett (Independent) 2.2%
Rhode Island	John Pastore	Democratic	1945 (Note: Pastore became governor in 1945 after predecessor (J. Howard McGrath) resigned.)	Incumbent re-elected.	▌ ✓ John Pastore (Democratic) 61.2%; ▌ Albert P. Ruerat (Republican) 38.4%; ▌ Clemens J. France (Progressive) 0.4%
South Dakota	George T. Mickelson	Republican	1946	Incumbent re-elected.	▌ ✓ George T. Mickelson (Republican) 61.1%; ▌ Harold J. Volz (Democratic) 38.9%
Tennessee	Jim Nance McCord	Democratic	1944	Incumbent lost renomination. Democratic hold.	▌ ✓ Gordon Browning (Democratic) 66.9%; ▌ Roy Acuff (Republican) 33.1%
Texas	Beauford H. Jester	Democratic	1946	Incumbent re-elected.	▌ ✓ Beauford H. Jester (Democratic) 84.7%; ▌ Alvin H. Lane (Republican) 14.7%; ▌ Herman Wright (Progressive) 0.3%; ▌ Gerard Overholt (Prohibition) 0.3%
Utah	Herbert B. Maw	Democratic	1940	Incumbent lost re-election. Republican gain.	▌ ✓ J. Bracken Lee (Republican) 55.0%; ▌Herbert B. Maw (Democratic) 45.0%
Vermont	Ernest W. Gibson Jr.	Republican	1946	Incumbent re-elected.	▌ ✓ Ernest W. Gibson Jr. (Republican) 71.9%; ▌ Charles F. Ryan (Democratic) 28.0%
Washington	Monrad Wallgren	Democratic	1944	Incumbent lost re-election. Republican gain.	▌ ✓ Arthur B. Langlie (Republican) 50.5%; ▌ Monrad Wallgren (Democratic) 47.2%; ▌ Russell H. Fluent (Progressive) 2.2%; ▌Henry Killman (Socialist Labor) 0.09%; ▌Daniel Roberts (Socialist Workers) 0.02%
West Virginia	Clarence W. Meadows	Democratic	1944	Incumbent term-limited. Democratic hold.	▌ ✓ Okey Patteson (Democratic) 57.1%; ▌ Herbert Stephenson Boreman (Republican) 42.9%
Wisconsin	Oscar Rennebohm	Republican	1947 (Note: Rennebohm became governor in 1947 after predecessor (Walter Samuel Goodland died.)	Incumbent re-elected.	▌ ✓ Oscar Rennebohm (Republican) 54.1%; ▌Carl W. Thompson (Democratic) 44.1%; ▌Henry J. Berquist (Progressive) 1.0%; ▌Walter H. Uphoff (Socialist) 0.7%; ▌James E. Boulton (Socialist Workers) 0.03%; ▌Georgia Cozzini (Socialist Labor) 0.03%

== Closest races ==
States where the margin of victory was under 5%:

1. Connecticut, 0.31%
2. Washington, 3.28%
3. New Hampshire, 4.94%

States where the margin of victory was under 10%:

1. Ohio, 7.33%
2. Delaware, 7.38%
3. Michigan, 7.75%
4. Minnesota, 8.08%
5. Indiana, 8.42%
6. Oregon, 8.70%
7. New Mexico, 9.44%
8. Utah, 9.98%
9. Wisconsin, 9.98%

Red denotes states won by Republicans. Blue denotes states won by Democrats.

== See also ==
- 1948 United States elections
  - 1948 United States presidential election
  - 1948 United States Senate elections
  - 1948 United States House of Representatives elections
