= 1942 Connecticut lieutenant gubernatorial election =

- November 3, 1942
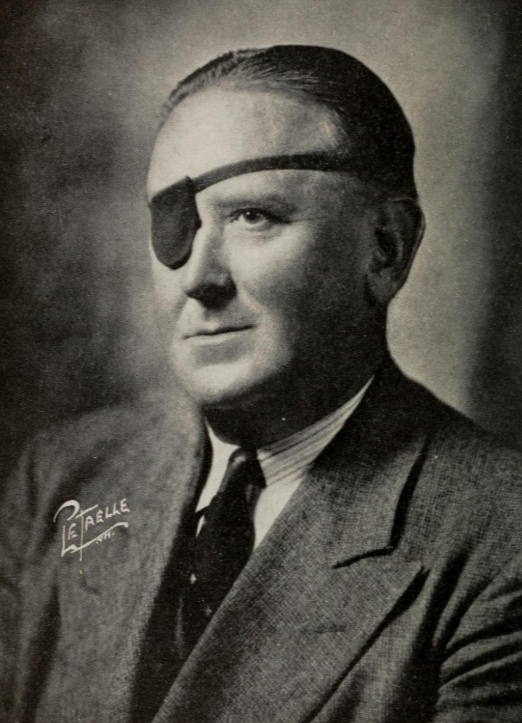

Nominee	William L. Hadden	Odell Shepard	Stanley W. Mayhew
Party	Republican	Democratic	Socialist
Popular vote	282,245	258,284	28,492
Percentage	49.60%	45.40%	5.00%
Lieutenant Governor before election
Odell Shepard
Democratic
Elected Lieutenant Governor
William L. Hadden
Republican

The 1942 Connecticut lieutenant gubernatorial election was held on November 3, 1942, to elect the lieutenant governor of Connecticut. Republican nominee and incumbent member of the Connecticut House of Representatives William L. Hadden won the election against incumbent Democratic lieutenant governor Odell Shepard and Socialist nominee Stanley W. Mayhew.

== General election ==
On election day, November 3, 1942, Republican nominee William L. Hadden won the election with 49.60% of the vote, thereby gaining Republican control over the office of lieutenant governor. Hadden was sworn in as the 87th lieutenant governor of Connecticut on January 6, 1943.

=== Results ===
Connecticut lieutenant gubernatorial election, 1942
Party	Candidate	Votes	%
Republican	William L. Hadden	282,245	49.60
Democratic	Odell Shepard (incumbent)	258,284	45.40
Socialist	Stanley W. Mayhew	28,492	5.00
Total votes		569,021	100.00
Republican gain from Democratic			
