= 1950 Connecticut Attorney General election =

- November 7, 1950
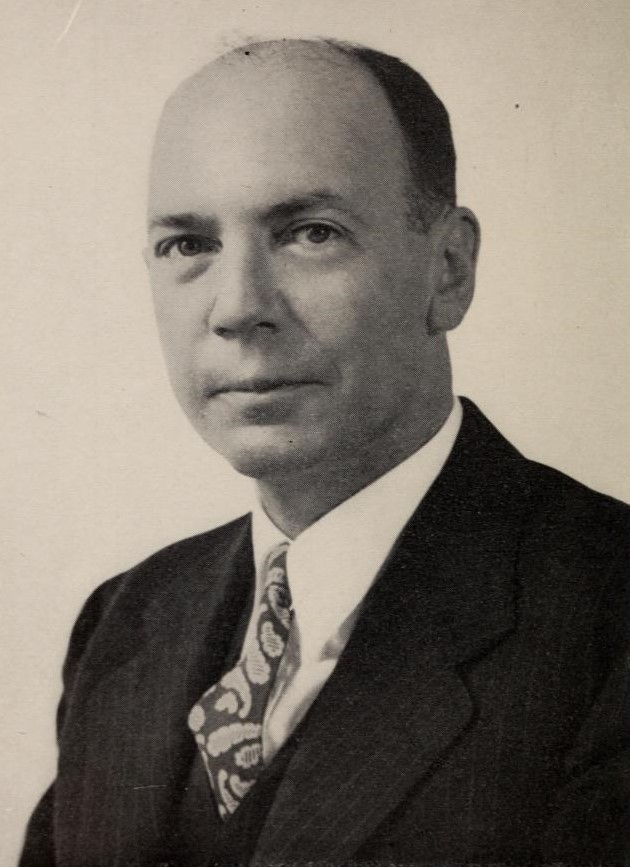

Nominee	George C. Conway	Alfred F. Wechsler
Party	Republican	Democratic
Popular vote	432,813	428,502
Percentage	50.3%	49.7%
- Conway: 50–60% 60–70% 70–80% 80–90% Wechsler: 50–60% 60–70%
Attorney General before election
William L. Hadden
Republican
Elected Attorney General
George C. Conway
Republican

The 1950 Connecticut Attorney General election was held on November 7, 1950, in order to elect the Attorney General of Connecticut. Republican nominee and former member of the Connecticut House of Representatives George C. Conway defeated Democratic nominee and incumbent member of the Connecticut State Senate Alfred F. Wechsler.

== General election ==
On election day, November 7, 1950, Republican nominee George C. Conway won the election by a margin of 4,311 votes against his opponent Democratic nominee Alfred F. Wechsler, thereby retaining Republican control over the office of Attorney General. Conway was sworn in as the 14th Attorney General of Connecticut on January 3, 1951.

=== Results ===
Connecticut Attorney General election, 1950
Party	Candidate	Votes	%
Republican	George C. Conway	432,813	50.25%
Democratic	Alfred F. Wechsler	428,502	49.75%
Total votes		861,315	100.00%
Republican hold			
