= Governor Mickelson =

Governor Mickelson may refer to:

- George S. Mickelson (1941–1993), 28th Governor of South Dakota
- George Theodore Mickelson (1903–1965), 18th Governor of South Dakota
