= Governor Shannon =

Governor Shannon may refer to:

- James C. Shannon (1896–1980), 77th Governor of Connecticut
- Wilson Shannon (1802–1877), 14th and 16th Governor of Ohio and 2nd Territorial Governor of Kansas
