= 1946 South Dakota Senate election =

- November 5, 1946

35 seats in the South Dakota Senate 18 seats needed for a majority
	Majority party	Minority party
Leader	Charles S. Reed	—
Party	Republican	Democratic
Leader since	1945
Leader's seat	28th (Pennington Co.)
Last election	35	0
Seats won	35	0
Seats after	34	0
Seat change	Steady	Steady
Popular vote	65,192 (Note: Vote totals from multi-county districts only)	12,390
- Republican hold Did not take office Multi-member districts: Republican majority Republican: 50–60% 60–70% 70–80% Unopposed; No results
President pro tempore before election
Charles S. Reed
Republican
Elected President pro tempore
E. L. Stavig
Republican

Elections to the South Dakota Senate were held on November 5, 1946, to elect 35 candidates to the Senate to serve a two-year term in the 30th South Dakota Legislature. Just as they did at the 1944 general election, the Republican Party took all 35 seats in the chamber, though C. F. Manson of District 26 did not attend the legislative session due to illness. Republican Senator E. L. Stavig of Rosholt (District 20, Roberts County) was elected President pro tempore of the Senate.

This election took place alongside races for U.S. House, governor, state house, and numerous other state and local elections.

== See also ==
- List of South Dakota state legislatures
