= 1946 Connecticut Attorney General election =

- November 5, 1946
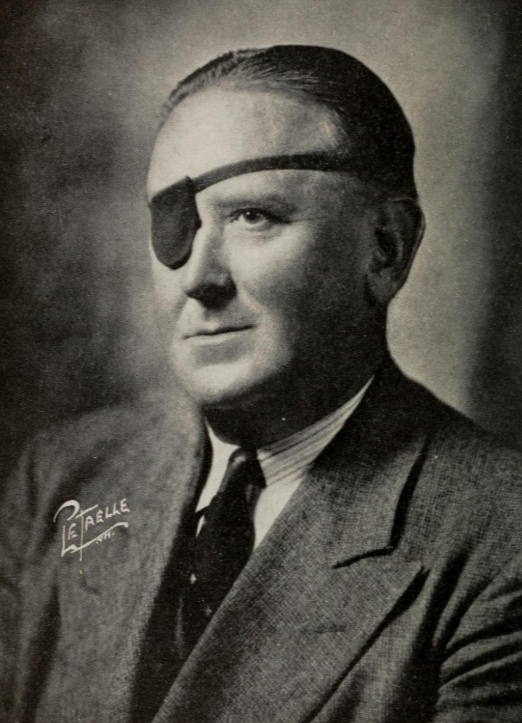

| Nominee | William L. Hadden | James J. O'Connell |
| Party | Republican | Democratic |
| Popular vote | 376,859 | 280,272 |
| Percentage | 57.4% | 42.6% |
- Hadden: 50–60% 60–70% 70–80% 80–90% 90–100% O'Connell: 50–60% 60–70%
Attorney General before election
William L. Hadden (Acting)
Republican
Elected Attorney General
William L. Hadden
Republican

The 1946 Connecticut Attorney General election was held on November 5, 1946, in order to elect the Attorney General of Connecticut. Republican nominee and incumbent acting Attorney General William L. Hadden defeated Democratic nominee James J. O'Connell.

== General election ==
On election day, November 5, 1946, Republican nominee William L. Hadden won the election by a margin of 96,587 votes against his opponent Democratic nominee James J. O'Connell, thereby retaining Republican control over the office of Attorney General. Hadden was sworn in for his first full term on January 4, 1947.

=== Results ===
Connecticut Attorney General election, 1946
| Party | Candidate | Votes | % |
|---|---|---|---|
| Republican | William L. Hadden (incumbent) | 376,859 | 57.35% |
| Democratic | James J. O'Connell | 280,272 | 42.65% |
| Total votes | | 657,131 | 100.00% |
| Republican hold | | | |
