= 1948 Connecticut lieutenant gubernatorial election =

- November 2, 1948

Nominee	William T. Carroll	Hugh Meade Alcorn
Party	Democratic	Republican
Popular vote	433,995	428,440
Percentage	50.30%	49.70%
Lieutenant Governor before election
Robert E. Parsons
Republican
Elected Lieutenant Governor
William T. Carroll
Democratic

The 1948 Connecticut lieutenant gubernatorial election was held on November 2, 1948, to elect the lieutenant governor of Connecticut. Democratic nominee and former Connecticut State Treasurer William T. Carroll won the election against Republican nominee and former member of the Connecticut House of Representatives Hugh Meade Alcorn.

== General election ==
On election day, November 2, 1948, Democratic nominee William T. Carroll won the election with 50.30% of the vote, thereby gaining Democratic control over the office of lieutenant governor. Carroll was sworn in as the 91st lieutenant governor of Connecticut on January 5, 1949.

=== Results ===
Connecticut lieutenant gubernatorial election, 1948
Party	Candidate	Votes	%
Democratic	William T. Carroll	433,995	50.30
Republican	Hugh Meade Alcorn	428,440	49.70
Total votes		862,435	100.00
Democratic gain from Republican			
