= George C. Conway =

American politician (1900–1969)

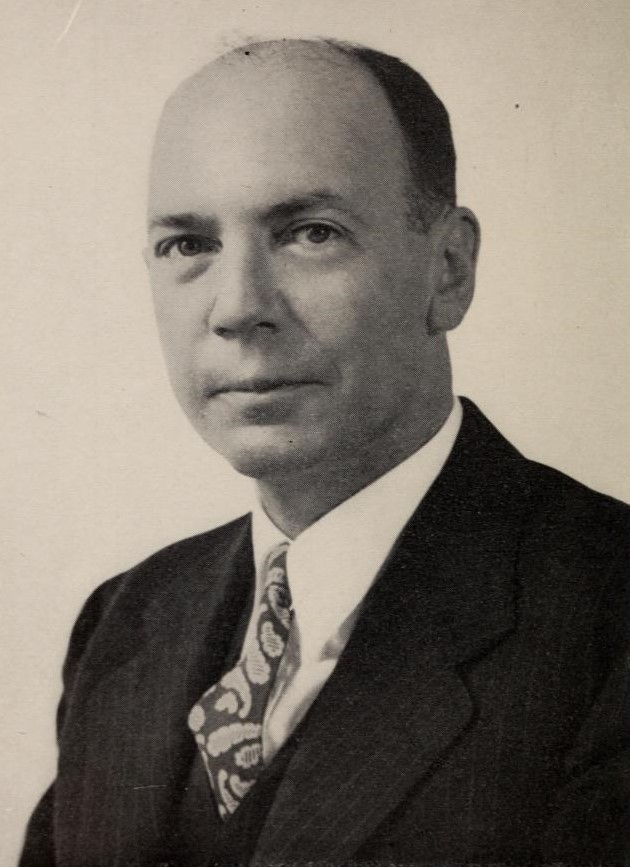

14th Attorney General of Connecticut
- In office January 3, 1951 – August 24, 1953
- Governor: John Davis Lodge
- Preceded by: William L. Hadden
- Succeeded by: William L. Beers

Member of the Connecticut House of Representatives from the Guilford district
- In office January 6, 1943 – January 5, 1949

Personal details
- Born: December 15, 1900 Guilford, Connecticut, U.S.
- Died: April 16, 1969 (aged 68) Middletown, Connecticut, U.S.
- Party: Republican
- Education: Wesleyan University (BS); Yale University (LL.B.)

George C. Conway (December 15, 1900 – April 16, 1969) was an American politician who served in the Connecticut House of Representatives from the Guilford district from 1943 to 1949 and as the Attorney General of Connecticut from 1951 to 1953.

He died on April 16, 1969, in Middletown, Connecticut at age 68.
