= Francesca Braggiotti =

Italian dancer, actress, dubber and first lady of Connecticut

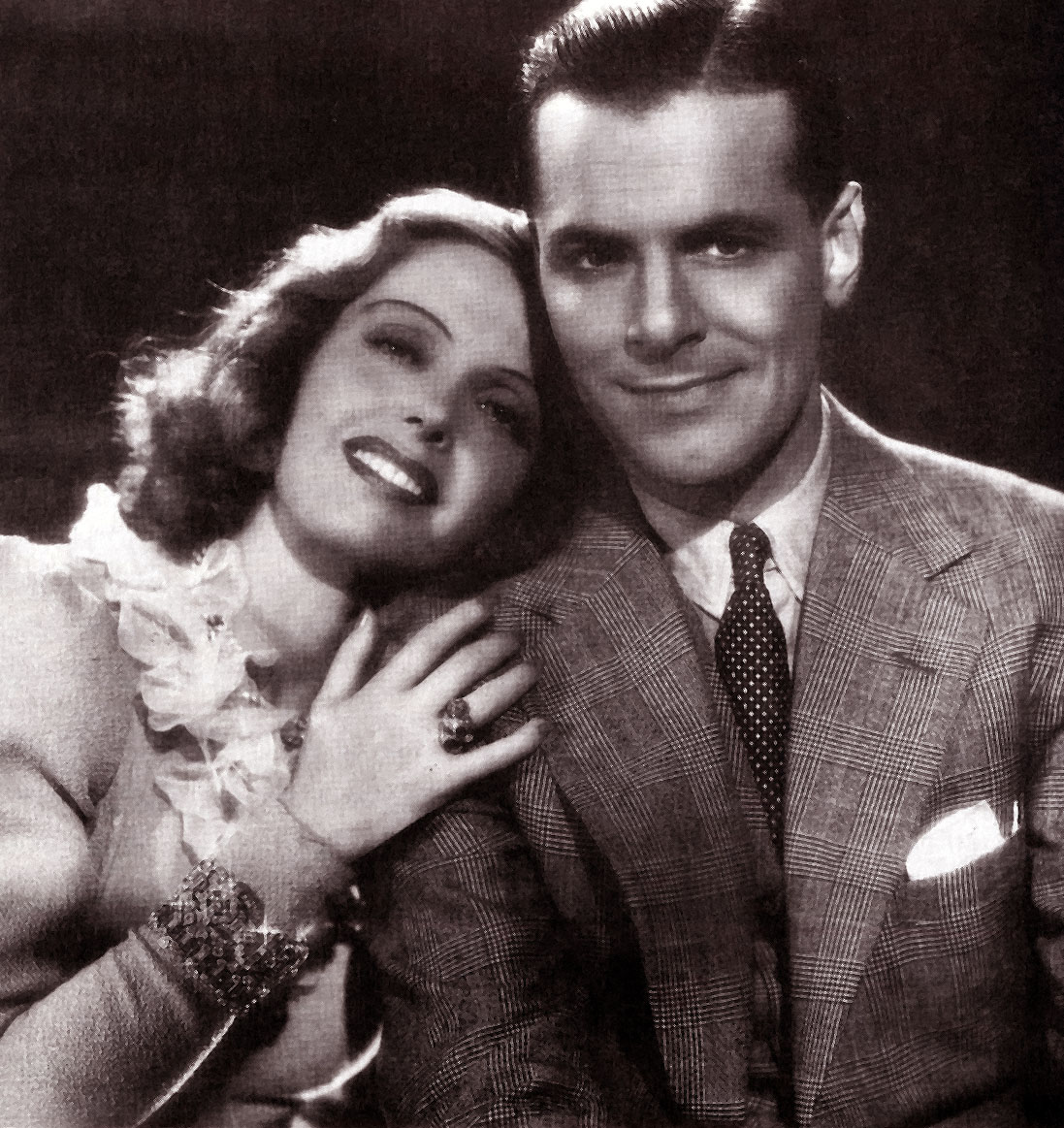
- Braggiotti with her husband John Davis Lodge (1938)

First Lady of Connecticut
- In office January 3, 1951 – January 5, 1955
- Governor: John Davis Lodge
- Preceded by: Dorothy Stebbens
- Succeeded by: Ruth Siegel

Personal details
- Born: October 17, 1902 Florence, Kingdom of Italy
- Died: February 25, 1998 (aged 95)
- Spouse: John Davis Lodge (m. 1929; died 1985)
- Children: 2, including Lily Lodge
- Relatives: Berthe Braggiotti (sister), Gloria Braggiotti Etting (sister), Mario Braggiotti (brother), Chadwick Braggiotti (brother)
- Occupation: Dancer, actress, and dubber

Francesca Braggiotti (October 17, 1902 – February 25, 1998) was an Italian dancer, actress, dubber, and first lady of Connecticut.

== Biography ==
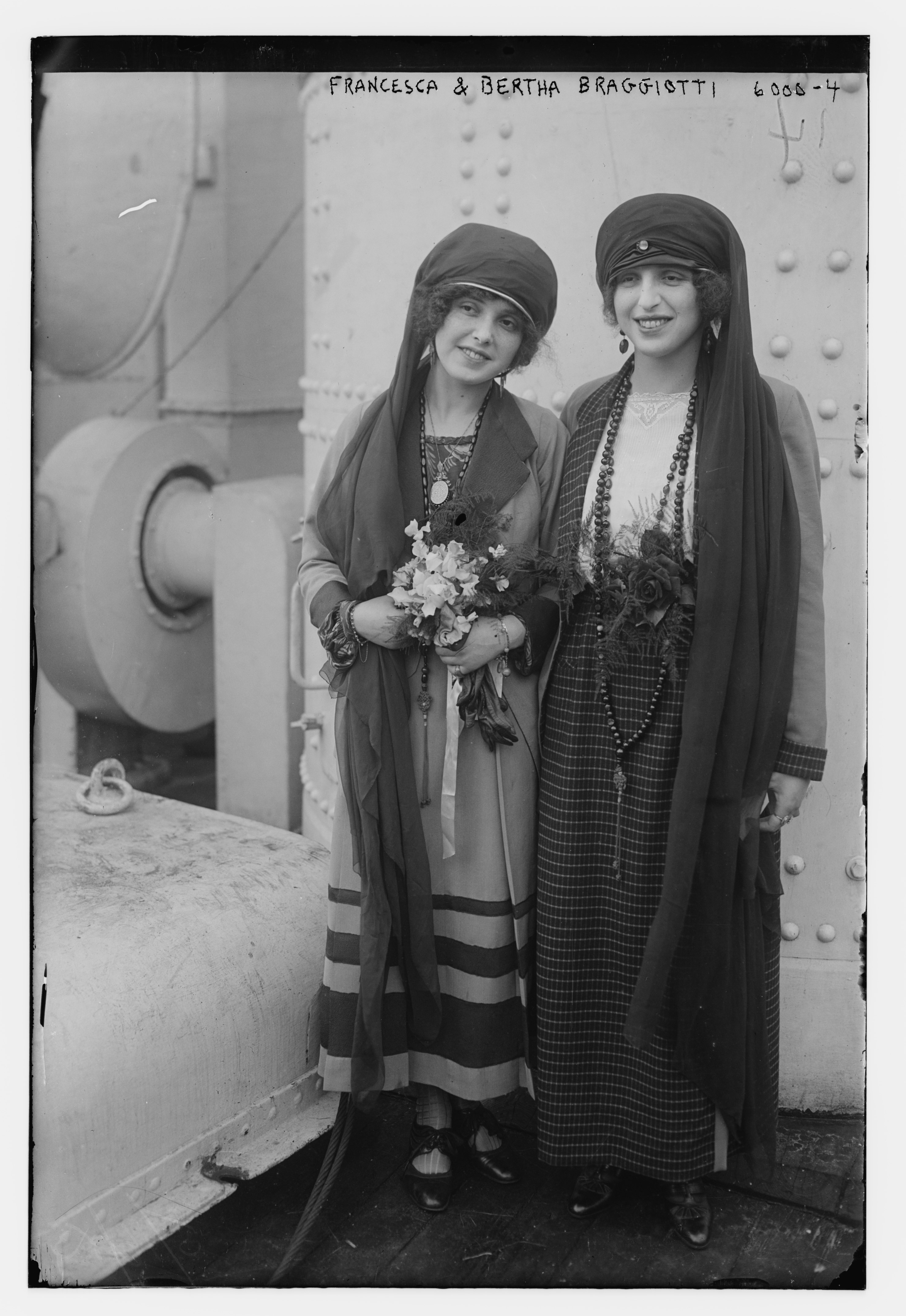
Francesca and Bertha Braggiotti

Francesca Braggiotti was born in Florence, her father was an Italian tenor, born in Smyrna; her mother was an American mezzo-soprano from Boston. Both her parents were converted to Buddhism, among the earliest Westerners to do so; she was the second of eight brothers and sisters, all destined for success in the arts.

She began her career as a dancer, forming the Braggiotti Sisters, a duo with her sister Berthe. The duo was an overwhelming success in Boston after World War I. Writer Alden Hatch wrote: "Two polyglot strikingly attractive and talented sisters, call Berthe and Francesca Braggiotti, were the biggest event of the Bostonian Society since Mrs. Jack Gardner smoked a cigarette in public and built Fenway Court ".

Francesca and her sister Berthe opened a dance studio above the barracks of the Brookline Fire Department. For a public performance sponsored by the exclusive Vincent Club, the Mayor was asked about the limits of public decency, as he had authorized their costumes for some artistic purposes, although too small to be admitted to a public beach.

The poet Amy Lowell was so enchanted that she composed an ode in honor of Francesca. Isabella Stewart Gardner asked them to a private performance at Fenway Court. The dance school of Braggiotti Sisters, as well as being the most expensive and requested, first introduced dance Expressionist movement in Boston and a new vision of health and beauty.

After the untimely death of her elder sister in 1928 Braggiotti went to work in cinema and began dubbing in Italy. She starred in Rasputin and the Empress (1932), Little Women (1933), Scipio Africanus: The Defeat of Hannibal (1937), and Tonight at Eleven (1938). In 1933 she performed in The Good Fairy in Harold Lloyd's Beverly Hills Little Theatre for Professionals.

She was the first Italian dubbed voice of Greta Garbo and spoke the first bar dubbed in Italian film history: "Give me a cigarette!" in the movie Mata Hari by George Fitzmaurice. She also dubbed the Swedish actress in Inspiration (Yvonne), Susan Lenox (Her Fall and Rise), Grand Hotel (Grusinskaya), As You Desire Me (Zadar / Countess Maria Varelli).

Braggiotti married John Davis Lodge in 1929, and worked with him on the set of Tonight at Eleven. After her husband's entry into politics, she withdrew from artistic life; he was a Republican politician, U.S. Representative from 1947 to 1951, governor of Connecticut from 1951 to 1955 and diplomatic ambassador to Spain, Argentina and Switzerland. She had two children, one of whom is Lily Lodge.

== Filmography ==
- Rasputin and the Empress, (1932)
- Little Women, directed by George Cukor (1933)
- Scipio Africanus: The Defeat of Hannibal, directed by Carmine Gallone (1937)
- Tonight at Eleven, directed by Oreste Biancoli (1937)

== Bibliography ==
- Gloria Braggiotti, Born in a crowd, Crowell, New York City, 1957.
- Salvatore John LaGumina, The Italian American experience: an encyclopedia, Garland Pub.2000, page 169.
- Jody Marie Weber, The Evolution of Aesthetic and Expressive Dance in Boston, Cambria Press, 2009.
