= 1946 Connecticut gubernatorial election =

- November 5, 1946
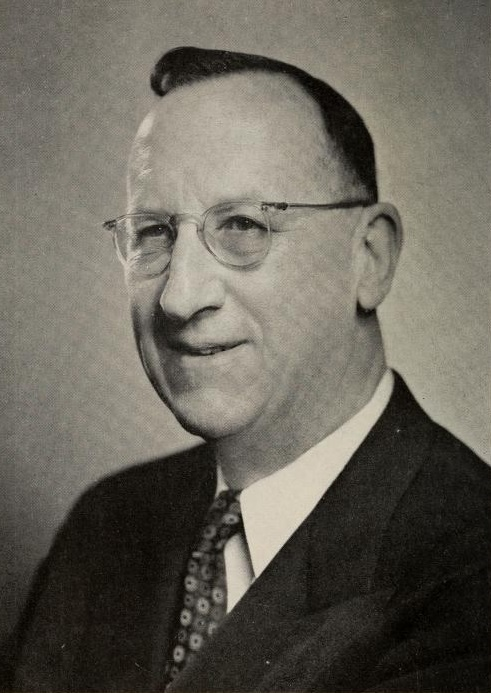

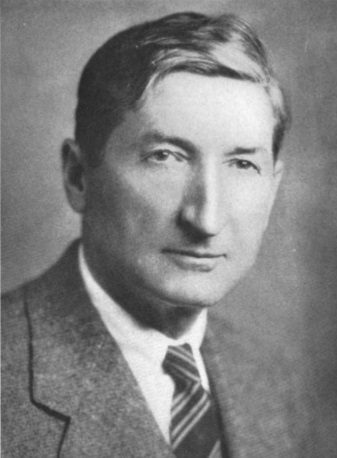
Nominee	James L. McConaughy	Charles W. Snow
Party	Republican	Democratic
Popular vote	371,852	276,335
Percentage	54.38%	40.41%
- McConaughy: 40–50% 50–60% 60–70% 70–80% 80–90% >90% Snow: 40–50% 50–60% 60–70%
Governor before election
Raymond E. Baldwin
Republican
Elected Governor
James L. McConaughy
Republican

The 1946 Connecticut gubernatorial election was held on November 5, 1946. Republican nominee James L. McConaughy defeated Democratic nominee Charles Wilbert Snow with 54.38% of the vote.

== General election ==
=== Candidates ===
Major party candidates

- James L. McConaughy, Republican
- Charles Wilbert Snow, Democratic

Other candidates

- Jasper McLevy, Socialist
- Herman N. Simon, Socialist Labor

=== Results ===
1946 Connecticut gubernatorial election
Party	Candidate	Votes	%
Republican	James L. McConaughy	371,852	54.38%
Democratic	Charles Wilbert Snow	276,335	40.41%
Socialist	Jasper McLevy	32,241	4.72%
Socialist Labor	Herman N. Simon	3,403	0.50%
Total votes		683,831	100.00%
Republican hold			
