= 1950 Connecticut gubernatorial election =

- November 7, 1950
- Turnout: 83.22%
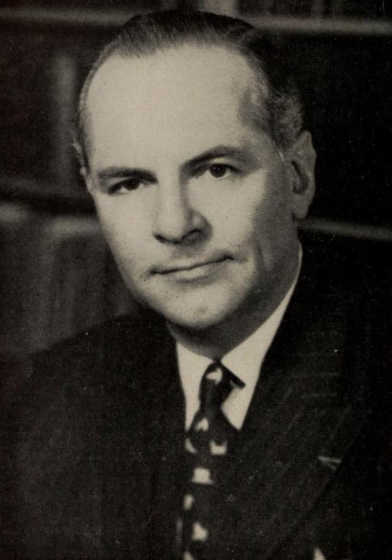

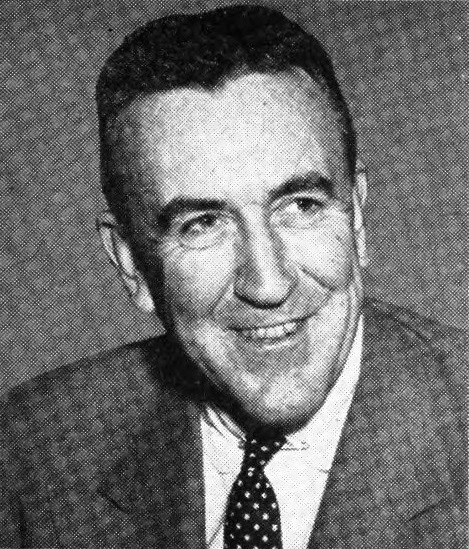
| Nominee | John Davis Lodge | Chester Bowles |
| Party | Republican | Democratic |
| Popular vote | 436,418 | 419,404 |
| Percentage | 49.66% | 47.73% |
- Lodge: 40–50% 50–60% 60–70% 70–80% 80–90% Bowles: 40–50% 50–60% 60–70% 70–80% No data
Governor before election
Chester Bowles
Democratic
Elected Governor
John Davis Lodge
Republican

The 1950 Connecticut gubernatorial election was held on November 7, 1950. Republican nominee John Davis Lodge defeated Democratic incumbent Chester Bowles with 49.66% of the vote.

This was the first gubernatorial election since the law was changed to have Connecticut's governors elected every four years, instead of every two years, as had been done previously. As a result, Lodge was the first Connecticut Governor to serve a four-year term.

== General election ==
=== Candidates ===
Major party candidates

- John Davis Lodge, Republican
- Chester Bowles, Democratic

Other candidates

- Jasper McLevy, Socialist

=== Results ===
1950 Connecticut gubernatorial election
| Party | Candidate | Votes | % |
|---|---|---|---|
| Republican | John Davis Lodge | 436,418 | 49.66% |
| Democratic | Chester Bowles (incumbent) | 419,404 | 47.73% |
| Socialist | Jasper McLevy | 22,913 | 2.61% |
| Total votes | | 878,735 | 100.00% |
| Republican gain from Democratic | | | |
