= Robert E. Parsons =

American politician (1892–1966)

- Parsons c. 1946

90th Lieutenant Governor of Connecticut
- In office March 7, 1948 – January 5, 1949
- Governor: James C. Shannon
- Preceded by: James C. Shannon
- Succeeded by: William T. Carroll

Member of the Connecticut Senate from the 5th district
- In office 1943–1948
- Preceded by: C. Fayette Curtiss
- Succeeded by: William H. Dallas

Member of the Connecticut House of Representatives from Farmington
- In office 1933–1941
- Preceded by: Charles A. Hackney; Adrian R. Wadsworth
- Succeeded by: Louis Shapiro; William W. Hoppin Jr.

Personal details
- Born: April 15, 1892 Unionville, Connecticut, U.S.
- Died: July 18, 1966 (aged 74)
- Party: Republican

Robert E. Parsons (April 15, 1892 – July 18, 1966) was an American politician who was the 90th lieutenant governor of Connecticut from 1948 to 1949.

== Early life ==
Robert E. Parsons was born in Unionville, Connecticut, on April 15, 1892. He was an Automobile dealer in Farmington. There still is a Robert E. Parsons Chevrolet Dealership in Farmington.

== Political career ==
Parsons was a Republican and was a member of the Connecticut House of Representatives from Farmington from 1933 to 1941. He was a member of the Connecticut Senate for the 5th District from 1943 to 1948. He served as President pro tempore of the Connecticut Senate.

On March 7, 1948, when James C. Shannon succeeded James L. McConaughy as Governor of Connecticut upon the death of the former, Parsons succeeded Shannon as Lieutenant Governor of Connecticut. Shannon and Parsons served for the remainder of the gubernatorial term, which ended on January 5, 1949.

== Death ==
Parsons died on July 18, 1966, at age 74.

== See also ==
- List of governors of Connecticut

Political offices
Preceded by James C. Shannon	Lieutenant Governor of Connecticut; 1948-1949	Succeeded by William T. Carroll
