= William L. Hadden =

American politician (1896–1983)

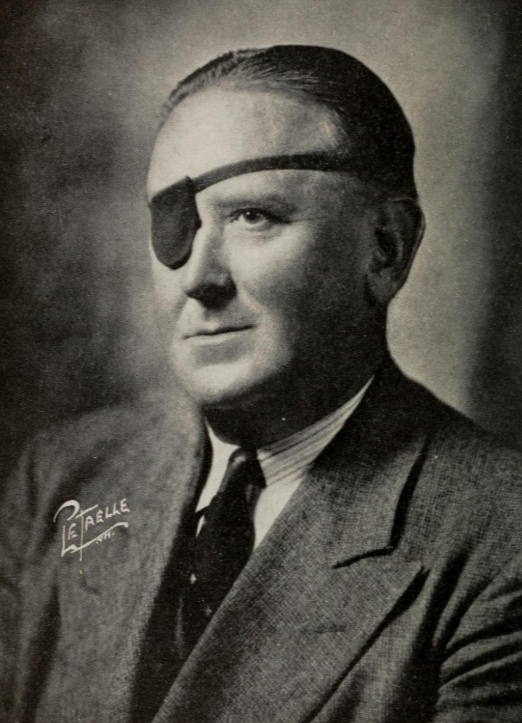

13th Connecticut Attorney General
- In office June 15, 1945 – January 3, 1951
- Governor: Raymond E. Baldwin; Charles W. Snow; James L. McConaughy; James C. Shannon; Chester Bowles
- Preceded by: Francis A. Pallotti
- Succeeded by: George C. Conway

87th Lieutenant Governor of Connecticut
- In office January 1943 – January 1945
- Governor: Raymond E. Baldwin
- Preceded by: Odell Shepard
- Succeeded by: Charles Wilbert Snow

Personal details
- Born: October 8, 1896 Elmira, New York, U.S.
- Died: July 11, 1983 (aged 86)
- Party: Republican
- Education: Fordham University

William L. Hadden (October 8, 1896 – July 11, 1983) was an American politician who was the 87th lieutenant governor of Connecticut from 1943 to 1945.

== Early life ==
William L. Hadden was born in Elmira, Chemung County, New York, on October 8, 1896. About one year later, he moved to New Haven, Connecticut, and in 1909 the family moved to West Haven. He went to public schools in New Haven, West Haven High School and the Fordham University School of Law. He was admitted to the State Bar in 1917. After discharge from military service in 1918, he practiced law. He was also Assistant Clerk of the Town Court of West Haven from 1919 to 1921, Prosecuting Attorney from 1923 to 1927 and judge from 1927 to 1937. From 1939 to 1943 he was Prosecuting Attorney.

== Family life ==
William L. Hadden married Mary McNamara in 1920. They had three children: William L. Hadden Jr., David C. Hadden, and Mary Ann Hadden Zimmerling. Mary died on December 15, 1981.

== Political career ==
William L. Hadden was a Republican. He represented his home town in the Connecticut General Assembly in the 1939 and 1941 sessions, in the latter session he was Chairman of the Judiciary Committee and Majority Leader.

He was elected Lieutenant Governor of Connecticut in November 1942 together with Republican gubernatorial candidate Raymond E. Baldwin. He served for one two-year term from January 6, 1943, but while Baldwin was reelected in 1944, Hadden was not and was replaced with Democrat Charles Wilbert Snow. Snow would replace Baldwin as governor late in 1946, when Baldwin became a U.S. Senator.

Hadden was appointed Attorney General of Connecticut by Baldwin in 1945, to fill the vacancy caused when Francis A. Pallotti resigned to become a judge. Hadden was then elected Attorney General for a full four-year term and served until 1951.

He was a delegate to the Republican National Convention in 1948.

== See also ==
- List of lieutenant governors of Connecticut

Political offices
Preceded by Odell Shepard	Lieutenant Governor of Connecticut; 1943-1945	Succeeded by Charles Wilbert Snow
Legal offices
Preceded by Francis A. Pallotti	Attorney General of Connecticut; 1945–1951	Succeeded by George C. Conway
