= Tonight at Eleven =

1938 film

- French poster
- Directed by: Oreste Biancoli
- Written by: Oreste Biancoli; Mario Camerini; Mario Soldati
- Produced by: Roberto Dandi
- Starring: John Lodge; Francesca Braggiotti; Ivana Claar
- Cinematography: Václav Vích
- Edited by: Ferdinando Maria Poggioli
- Music by: Luigi Malatesta
- Production company: SECET
- Distributed by: Artisti Associat; Gray-Film (France)
- Release date: January 1938
- Running time: 70 minutes
- Country: Italy
- Language: Italian

Tonight at Eleven (Italian: Stasera alle undici) is a 1938 Italian "white-telephones" mystery film directed by Oreste Biancoli and starring John Lodge, Francesca Braggiotti and Ivana Claar.

== Synopsis ==
The former wife of a foreign ambassador is a huge fun of thriller novels. However she is kidnapped by a gang.

It was shot at the Cinecittà Studios in Rome. The film's sets were designed by the art director Guido Fiorini.

== Cast ==
- John Lodge as Jack Morris
- Francesca Braggiotti as Lady Elena Norton
- Ivana Claar as Ivana
- Bianca Stagno Bellincioni as La marchesa di Fondi
- Enrico Glori as Gabry, il gangster
- Piero Pastore as Willy
- Memo Benassi as L'ambasciatore Leopoldo Norton
- Sergio Tofano as Il colonnello Muffon
- Clara Padoa as Dorothy
- Cesare Zoppetti as Severino
- Vittorio Vaser as Walter
- Renato Chiantoni as Il delatore del "Luna Bar"
- Arturo Bragaglia as Il pianista del "Luna Bar"
- Emilio Petacci as Il maggiordomo del ministero del Commercio
- Cesare Polacco as Il benzinaio
- Ugo Sasso as Leone
- Paolo Varna as Max
- Liolà Bonfili
- Nino Marchetti as Il direttore del cinema
- Edda Soligo as La ragazza del tiro a segno
- Eduardo Passarelli

== Bibliography ==
- Roberto Chiti & Roberto Poppi. I film: Tutti i film italiani dal 1930 al 1944. Gremese Editore, 2005.
