= 1954 Connecticut gubernatorial election =

- November 2, 1954
- Turnout: 81.31%
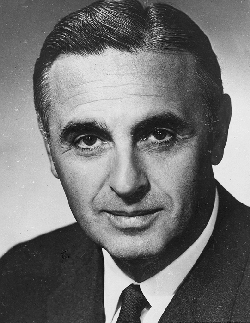

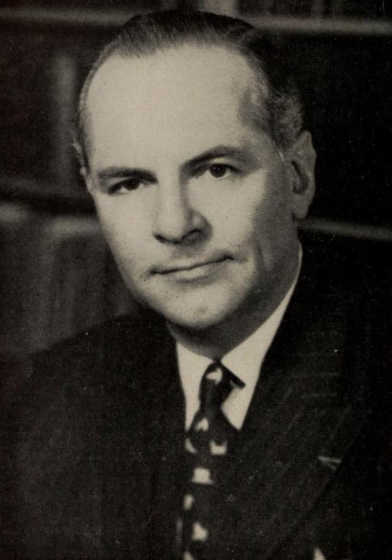
Nominee	Abraham Ribicoff	John Davis Lodge
Party	Democratic	Republican
Popular vote	463,643	460,528
Percentage	49.50%	49.16%
- Ribicoff: 50–60% 60–70% Lodge: 40–50% 50–60% 60–70% 70–80% 80–90%
Governor before election
John Davis Lodge
Republican
Elected Governor
Abraham Ribicoff
Democratic

The 1954 Connecticut gubernatorial election was held on Tuesday November 2.to elect next Governor of Connecticut. Democratic candidate Abraham Ribicoff narrowly defeated Republican Candidate incumbent Governor of Connecticut and John Davis Lodge with 49.50% of the vote. This is the last time that an incumbent governor of Connecticut lost reelection.

== General election ==
=== Candidates ===
Major party candidates

- Abraham Ribicoff, Democratic
- John Davis Lodge, Republican

Other candidates

- Jasper McLevy, Socialist

=== Results ===
1954 Connecticut gubernatorial election
Party	Candidate	Votes	%
Democratic	Abraham Ribicoff	463,643	49.50%
Republican	John Davis Lodge (incumbent)	460,528	49.16%
Socialist	Jasper McLevy	11,159	1.19%
Total votes		936,753	100.00%
Democratic gain from Republican			
