= William T. Carroll =

American politician (1902–1992)

Connecticut State Treasurer
- In office 1945–1947
- Governor: Raymond E. Baldwin; Charles Wilbert Snow
- Preceded by: Carl M. Sharpe
- Succeeded by: Joseph A. Adorno

91st Lieutenant Governor of Connecticut
- In office 1949–1951
- Governor: Chester Bowles
- Preceded by: Robert E. Parsons
- Succeeded by: Edward N. Allen

Personal details
- Born: William Thomas Carroll; June 25, 1902 Torrington, Connecticut, U.S.
- Died: October 25, 1992 (aged 90) Torrington, Connecticut, U.S.
- Party: Democratic

William Thomas Carroll (June 25, 1902 – October 25, 1992) was an American politician who was the 91st lieutenant governor of Connecticut from 1949 to 1951.

== Early life ==
William T. Carroll was born in Torrington, Litchfield County, Connecticut, June 25, 1902 He graduated from Torrington High School and worked for the Brooks Bank and Trust Company in Torrington for 25 years.

== Political career ==
Carroll was a Democrat. He was Connecticut State Treasurer from 1945, but was defeated for reelection in 1946, thus ending his term in early 1947. In 1948, he was running mate of gubernatorial candidate Chester Bowles and won, they entered service on January 5, 1949. They ran for reelection in November 1950, but lost and ended their service on January 3, 1951.

Carroll lost bids for the United States Senate in 1952 and the Governorship in 1954. He was the mayor of Torrington from 1953 to 1957. From 1962, he ran a real-estate office in Hartford.

He died on Sunday October 25, 1992, in Torrington, at the age of 90.

== See also ==
- List of governors of Connecticut

Political offices
Preceded by Carl M. Sharpe	Connecticut State Treasurer; 1945–1947	Succeeded by Joseph A. Adorno
Preceded by Robert E. Parsons	Lieutenant Governor of Connecticut; 1949-1951	Succeeded by Edward N. Allen
