= Lily Lodge =

American actress (1930–2021)

- Born: Lily de Pourtales Lodge; April 12, 1930; New York City
- Died: August 7, 2021 (aged 91)
- Education: Wellesley College
- Occupations: Actress, acting coach and etiquette consultant
- Spouse: James Lewis Marcus (m. 1962)
- Parent(s): John Davis Lodge; Francesca Braggiotti
- Relatives: Henry Cabot Lodge Jr., uncle George Cabot Lodge, grandfather
- Family: Lodge family

Lily de Pourtales Lodge (April 12, 1930 – August 7, 2021) was an American actress, acting coach and etiquette consultant. She was the co-founder of Actors Conservatory in New York City.

== Early years ==
Born in New York City, Lodge was a member of the Lodge family and was the daughter of career diplomat John Davis Lodge, who also served as the Governor of Connecticut. Her mother, Francesca Braggiotti, was an Italian dancer and actress. Her uncle was vice-presidential candidate Henry Cabot Lodge Jr., and George Cabot Lodge was her grandfather. She was educated at European schools as her parents traveled, and she became fluent in French and Italian. She graduated from Rosemary Hall and Wellesley College.

== Career ==
Lodge portrayed a French maid in French Without Tears, a 1947 production of the Westport County Playhouse. She appeared on an episode of Play of the Week in 1960, an episode of Naked City in 1963, and in Mona Lisa Smile in 2003, Lodge played an uncredited role in the 1933 literary adaptation Little Women, a notable pre-code film.

Lodge later worked as a crew member of the 2013 adaptation of The Great Gatsby as an acting coach. She worked as an etiquette consultant for Kate & Leopold, released in 2001, and The Age of Innocence, released in 1993.

Lodge's Broadway credits include Cyrano de Bergerac (1953), What Every Woman Knows (1954), The Wisteria Trees (1955), The Skin of Our Teeth (1955), and The Good Soup (1960).

Lodge was a member of the Actors Studio in New York and the Herbert Berghof Studio. She worked with producer Roger Stevens and sometimes made tours of the United States for a lecture reading series.

Lodge's work on television included being mistress of ceremonies on Man in Your Life. On radio she portrayed Peggy Anderson on This Is Nora Drake.

=== Actors Conservatory ===
Lily Lodge was the director of the Actors Conservatory in New York City, where actors develop through the use of sense memory.

== Personal life and death ==
Lodge married James Lewis Marcus, a partner in a chemical company, on June 8, 1962, in Westport, Connecticut. He served as New York City Water Commissioner under Mayor Lindsay. Lodge had two sons, George and James Lewis Marcus Jr. She died on August 7, 2021, at the age of 91.

== Filmography ==
- Little Women (1933 film) (Lily) (uncredited)
- The Play of the Week (1960)
- Naked City (TV series) (1963) (Olga)
- Say Yes (1986) (New York Woman)
- Mona Lisa Smile (2003) (House Matron)
