= 1948 United States elections =

- ← 1946 1947 1948 1949 1950 → Presidential election year
- Election day: November 2
- Incumbent president: ▌Harry S. Truman (D)
- Next Congress: 81st

Presidential election
- Partisan control: Democratic hold
- Popular vote margin: Democratic +4.5%
- Electoral vote
- Harry S. Truman (D): 303
- Thomas E. Dewey (R): 189
- Strom Thurmond (SRD): 39
- 1948 presidential election results. Red denotes states won by Dewey, blue denotes states won by Truman, and orange denotes states won by Thurmond. Numbers indicate the electoral votes won by each candidate.

Senate elections
- Overall control: Democratic gain
- Seats contested: 33 of 96 seats (32 Class 2 seats + 2 special elections)
- Net seat change: Democratic +9
- 1948 Senate results Democratic gain Democratic hold Republican hold

House elections
- Overall control: Democratic gain
- Seats contested: All 435 voting members
- Popular vote margin: Democratic +7.2%
- Net seat change: Democratic +75
- 1948 House election results Democratic gain Democratic hold Republican gain Republican hold

Gubernatorial elections
- Seats contested: 33
- Net seat change: Democratic +6
- 1948 gubernatorial election results Democratic gain Democratic hold Republican gain Republican hold

Elections were held on November 2, 1948. The election took place during the beginning stages of the Cold War. Democratic incumbent President Harry S. Truman was elected to a full term defeating Republican nominee New York Governor Thomas E. Dewey and two erstwhile Democrats. The Democrats won back control of Congress from the Republicans. Until 2020, the Democrats would never again flip a chamber of Congress in a presidential election cycle.

In the presidential election, President Truman ran for reelection despite being widely seen, even by fellow Democrats, as a vulnerable incumbent who was too risky for the party to nominate, but he ultimately won his party's nomination. In the fight for the Republican nomination, Thomas E. Dewey, who lost the previous presidential election, was renominated. In the end, Truman won the presidential election over Dewey in an upset.

In the congressional elections, the Democratic Party benefited from the coattails of Truman's victory and retook Congress. In the Senate, the Democrats took nine seats from the Republicans, regaining control of the chamber. In the House of Representatives, the Democrats won the national popular vote by a margin of 7.2 percentage points, flipped 75 seats from the Republicans, and won a sizable majority in the chamber; a large swing in the House of Representatives would not occur again until 2010.

In the gubernatorial elections, Democrats won six seats from the Republicans and won a majority of gubernatorial offices, Puerto Rico also elected Luis Muñoz Marín of the Popular Democratic Party as its first democratically elected governor.

This is the last time where the incumbent president's coattails led to both houses of Congress flipping in a single election cycle.

== President ==
In what is considered by most historians as the greatest upset in the history of American presidential politics, Democratic incumbent President Harry S. Truman defeated Republican nominee Thomas E. Dewey. Going into Election Day, virtually every prediction (with or without public opinion polls) indicated that Truman would lose. Truman took most states outside the Northeast and Deep South, and won the popular vote by four points. Dewey won his party's nomination for the second straight election, defeating Ohio Senator Robert A. Taft and former Minnesota Governor Harold Stassen on the Republican convention's second ballot. Truman won the Democratic nomination on the first ballot, but the party's platform on civil rights caused a third party run by Dixiecrat Strom Thurmond, the Governor of South Carolina. Thurmond took four states in the Deep South. Former Vice President and former Democrat Henry A. Wallace ran as the Progressive nominee, but took only two percent of the popular vote.

== United States House of Representatives ==
As in the Senate, Truman's labeling of the Republican-controlled Congress as "obstructionist" helped the Democrats win a net gain of 75 seats in the House, giving them control of the chamber.

Future president Gerald Ford won his first election in this year, being elected to Michigan's 5th congressional district.

== United States Senate ==
The Democrats gained nine seats in the Senate, enough to give them control of the chamber over the Republicans. Truman successfully campaigned against an "obstructionist" Congress that had blocked many of his initiatives. In addition, the U.S. economy had recovered from the postwar recession of 1946–1947.
