= John Davis Lodge =

American politician (1903–1985)

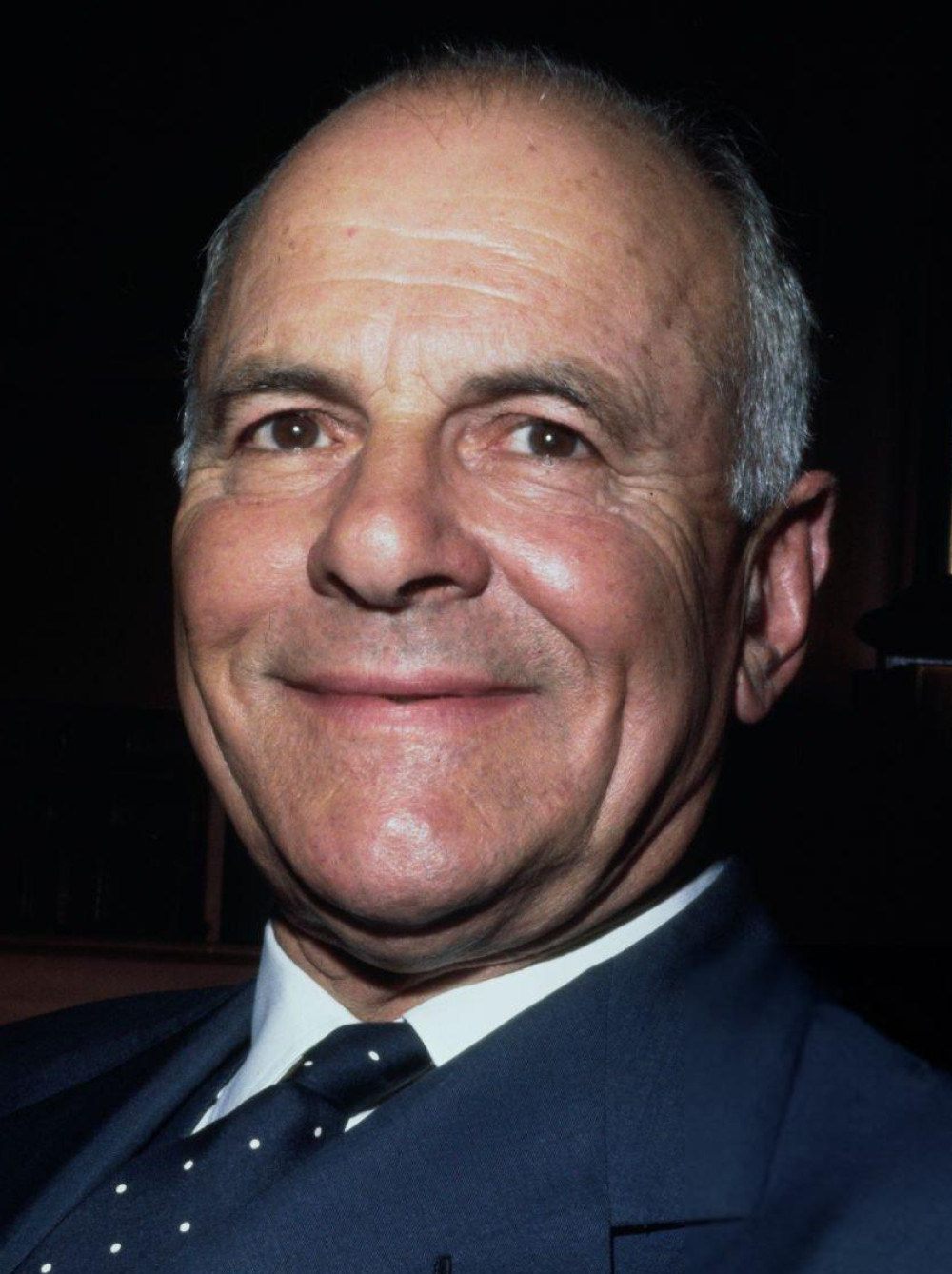
- Lodge in 1969

United States Ambassador to Switzerland
- In office May 19, 1983 – April 30, 1985
- President: Ronald Reagan
- Preceded by: Faith Ryan Whittlesey
- Succeeded by: Faith Ryan Whittlesey

38th United States Ambassador to Argentina
- In office July 23, 1969 – November 10, 1973
- President: Richard Nixon
- Preceded by: Carter L. Burgess
- Succeeded by: Robert Charles Hill

48th United States Ambassador to Spain
- In office March 24, 1955 – April 13, 1961
- President: Dwight D. Eisenhower
- Preceded by: James Clement Dunn
- Succeeded by: Anthony Joseph Drexel Biddle Jr.

79th Governor of Connecticut
- In office January 3, 1951 – January 5, 1955
- Lieutenant: Edward N. Allen
- Preceded by: Chester Bowles
- Succeeded by: Abraham Ribicoff

Member of the U.S. House of Representatives from Connecticut's 4th district
- In office January 3, 1947 – January 3, 1951
- Preceded by: Clare Boothe Luce
- Succeeded by: Albert P. Morano

Personal details
- Born: October 20, 1903 Washington, D.C., U.S.
- Died: October 29, 1985 (aged 82) New York City, New York, U.S.
- Resting place: Arlington National Cemetery
- Party: Republican
- Spouse: Francesca Braggiotti (m. 1929)
- Children: 2, including Lily
- Relatives: Lodge family
- Education: Harvard University; Harvard Law School

Military service
- Allegiance: United States
- Branch/service: United States Navy
- Years of service: 1942–1946 (Active); 1946–1966 (Reserve)
- Rank: Captain
- Battles/wars: World War II
- Awards: Legion of Honor; Croix de Guerre

John Davis Lodge (October 20, 1903 – October 29, 1985) was an American film actor, lawyer, politician, and diplomat. He was the 79th governor of Connecticut from 1951 to 1955, and later served as U.S. ambassador to Spain, Argentina, and Switzerland. As an actor, he often was credited simply as John Lodge. He had roles in four Hollywood films between 1933 and 1935, including playing Marlene Dietrich's lover in The Scarlet Empress and Shirley Temple's father in The Little Colonel. He starred or co-starred in many British and European films between 1935 and 1940.

Lodge was a member of four prominent political families in the Northeast United States: the Cabot, Lodge, Frelinghuysen and Davis families. He was a direct descendant of at least seven U.S. senators, and had many other politicians in his family, including his brother, Senator Henry Cabot Lodge Jr., who was the Republican nominee for Vice President of the United States in 1960.

== Early life ==
John Lodge was born in Washington, D.C. His father was George Cabot Lodge, a poet, who was a scion of the prominent Cabot and Lodge families of Boston. Through his father, Lodge was a grandson of Senator Henry Cabot Lodge, great-great-grandson of Senator Elijah H. Mills, and great-great-great-grandson of Senator George Cabot. His mother, Mathilda Elizabeth Frelinghuysen Davis, was a scion of the Frelinghuysen and Davis families. Through his mother, he was a great-great-grandson of Senator John Davis, a great-grandson of Senator Frederick Theodore Frelinghuysen, a great-great-grandson of Senator Theodore Frelinghuysen, and a great-great-great-grandson of Senator Frederick Frelinghuysen. He had two siblings: Henry Cabot Lodge Jr., also a politician, and Helena Lodge de Streel, a baroness.

Lodge attended the Evans School for Boys in Mesa, Arizona; Middlesex School in Concord, Massachusetts; Ecole de Droit in Paris, France; and St. Albans School in Washington, D.C. In 1925, he graduated from Harvard College, where he was a member of the Fox Club. In 1929, he graduated from Harvard Law School. In 1932, he was admitted to the New York bar and commenced practice in New York City.

== Acting career ==
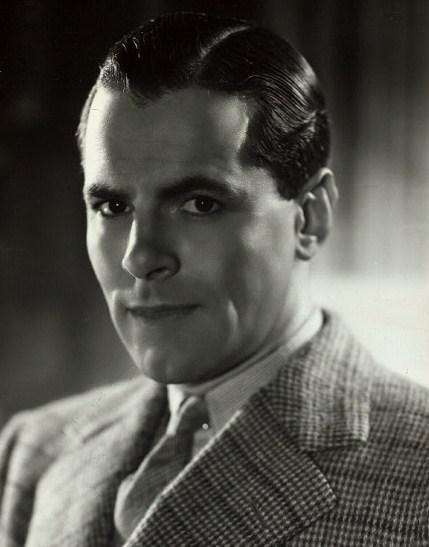
Lodge during his acting days in 1935

During the 1930s, and after a brief career as a lawyer, Lodge worked as an actor on screen and stage, appearing in starring roles in several notable productions, including some major Hollywood pictures.

Lodge was affiliated with the motion picture industry and the theater from 1933 to 1942, appearing in movies such as Little Women and The Little Colonel in which he played Shirley Temple's father. He was Marlene Dietrich's co-star in The Scarlet Empress. Lodge appeared in several European-made films, in France and the United Kingdom, playing Bulldog Drummond in the 1937 film Bulldog Drummond at Bay. A fluent French speaker, he performed his roles in French in Maurice Tourneur's Koenigsmark (1935) and in Max Ophüls's De Mayerling à Sarajevo, in which he played the part of Archduke Franz Ferdinand (1940). In 1941, after returning to the United States, he appeared in several Broadway stage productions, including Lillian Hellman's Watch on the Rhine.

== Military service ==
Lodge served in the United States Navy as a lieutenant and lieutenant commander from August 1942 to January 1946, and was a liaison officer between the French and American fleets. He was decorated with the rank of Chevalier in the French Legion of Honor and with the Croix de Guerre 1939–1945 with palm by General Charles de Gaulle. After the war, he engaged in research work in economics. He retired from the United States Navy Reserve in 1966 with the rank of captain.

== Political career ==
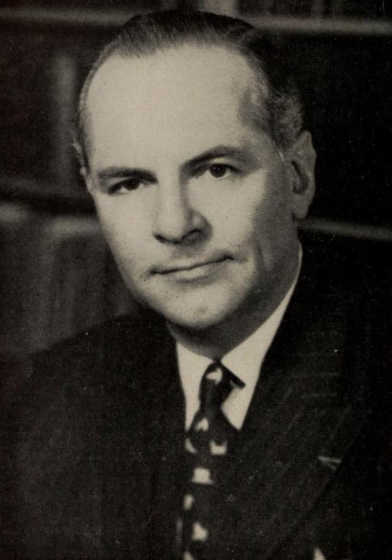
Lodge as governor

Lodge was elected as a Republican from Connecticut's 4th congressional district to the 80th and 81st Congresses, serving from January 3, 1947 to January 3, 1951. He replaced the retiring Republican Clare Boothe Luce. He did not run for a third term in 1950, choosing instead to run for governor of Connecticut in that year's election. He ran against incumbent governor Chester Bowles and defeated him in what was described as a "bitter" election, in which Lodge sought to portray Bowles as an extreme left-winger. Lodge served as governor from January 1951 to January 1955; he was the first governor of Connecticut to serve after the state's rules were changed to have elections every four years instead of every two.

He was a delegate to the Republican National Convention from Connecticut in 1952 and 1960.

Lodge ran for re-election in 1954, but lost to Democrat Abraham Ribicoff. Local legend is that the proximate cause of Lodge's defeat was disenchantment on the part of Fairfield County Republicans with the disruption caused by the construction of the Connecticut Turnpike. The highway officially was named the Governor John Davis Lodge Turnpike.

After stepping down as governor, Lodge was appointed United States Ambassador to Spain by President Dwight D. Eisenhower, where he served from January 1955 until the end of Eisenhower's term in office in January 1961. Lodge was the national president of the non-profit organization Junior Achievement, Inc. from 1963 to 1964.

Lodge ran for the U.S. Senate in the 1964 election. He won the Republican nomination but lost to incumbent Democratic senator Thomas J. Dodd, 35.34% to 64.66%. He served as chairman of the Committee Foreign Policy Research Institute, University of Pennsylvania from 1964 to 1969; delegate and assistant floor leader, Connecticut Constitutional Convention in 1965; United States Ambassador to Argentina, from 1969 to 1973; and United States Ambassador to Switzerland in 1983.

== Personal life ==
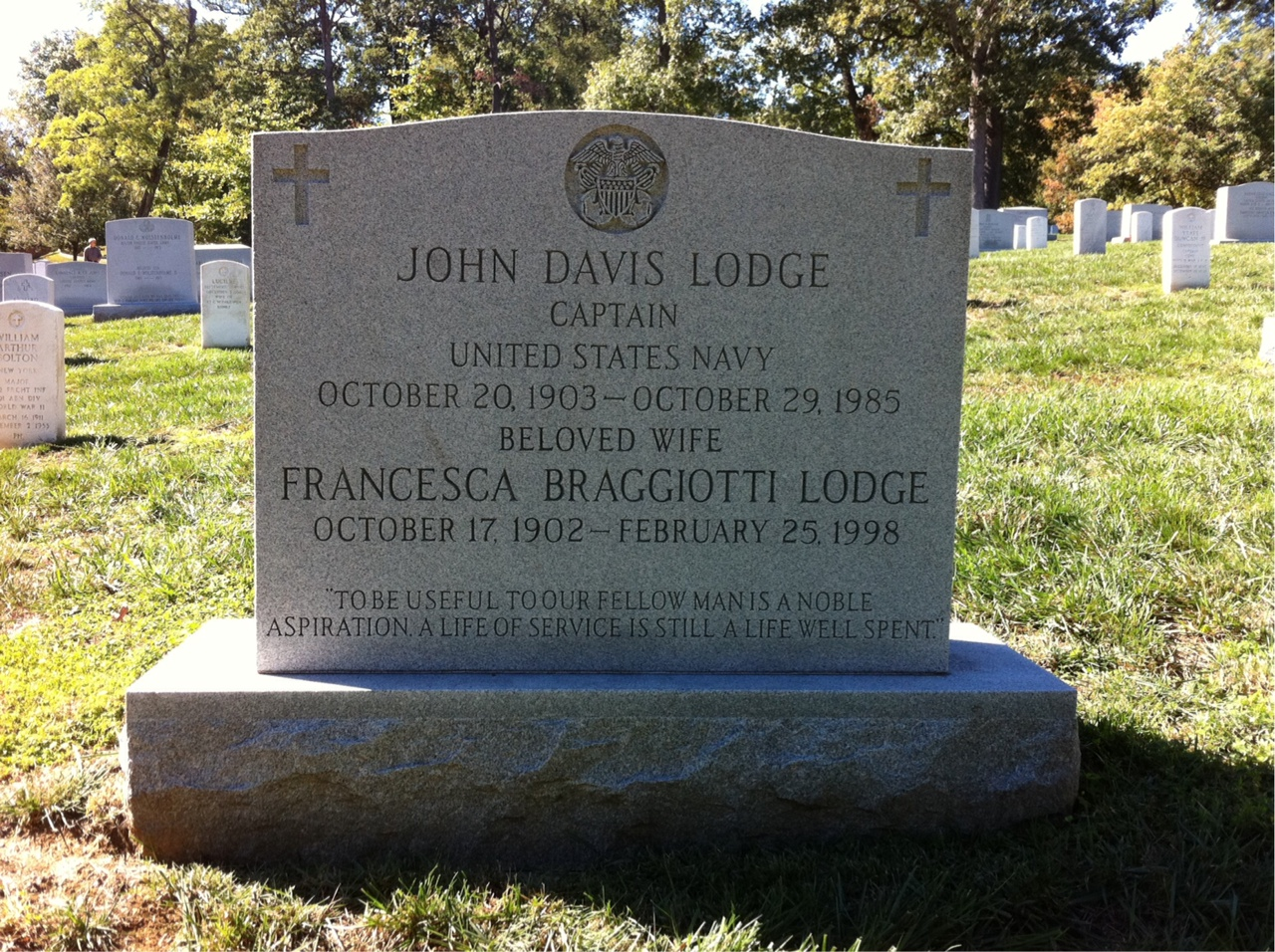
Grave at Arlington National Cemetery

He was married July 6, 1929 to actress and ballet dancer Francesca Braggiotti; both of them appearing in the 1938 film Tonight at Eleven. Braggiotti was Italian, and Lodge was notable in Congress for his active support of Italy. They had three daughters, Lily, Beatrice, and Edith. Lily Lodge is the director of the Actors Conservatory, and Beatrice is married to Antonio de Oyarzabal, the former ambassador of Spain to the United States. Edith had Down syndrome and was placed in a private foster arrangement. Lodge omitted her from his congressional biography. He was a resident of Westport, Connecticut until his death in New York City. Lodge was interred in Arlington National Cemetery. Two months after his death, the Connecticut Turnpike was renamed the Gov. John Davis Lodge Turnpike in his honor.

== Selected filmography ==
- The Woman Accused (1933)
- Little Women (1933) as Brooke
- The Scarlet Empress (1934)
- Menace (1934)
- The Little Colonel (1935)
- Koenigsmark (1935)
- The Tenth Man (1936)
- Ourselves Alone (1936)
- Sensation (1936)
- Bulldog Drummond at Bay (1937)
- Premiere (1938)
- Queer Cargo (1938)
- Bank Holiday (1938)
- Tonight at Eleven (1938)
- Lightning Conductor (1938)
- Just Like a Woman (1939)
- Heartbeat (1939)
- The White Slave (1939)
- Sarajevo (1940)

== Published works ==
- Lodge, John Davis (1962). "The Iberian Peninsula and Western Europe". Journal of International Affairs. 16 (1): 77–78. JSTOR 24363099.

U.S. House of Representatives
Preceded by Clare Boothe Luce	Member of the U.S. House of Representatives from Connecticut's 4th congressional district 1947–1951	Succeeded by Albert P. Morano
Political offices
Preceded by Chester Bowles	Governor of Connecticut; 1951–1955	Succeeded by Abraham A. Ribicoff
Diplomatic posts
Preceded by James Clement Dunn	United States Ambassador to Spain; 1955–1961	Succeeded by Anthony Joseph Drexel Biddle
Preceded by Carter L. Burgess	United States Ambassador to Argentina; 1969–1973	Succeeded by Robert C. Hill
Preceded by Faith Ryan Whittlesey	United States Ambassador to Switzerland; 1983–1985	Succeeded by Faith Ryan Whittlesey
Party political offices
Preceded by James C. Shannon	Republican nominee for Governor of Connecticut; 1950, 1954	Succeeded by Fred R. Zeller
Preceded by William A. Purtell	Republican nominee for United States Senator from Connecticut (Class 1); 1964	Succeeded by Lowell Weicker
