= Odell Shepard =

American professor, poet, and politician

86th Lieutenant Governor of Connecticut
- In office 1941–1943
- Governor: Robert A. Hurley
- Preceded by: James L. McConaughy
- Succeeded by: William L. Hadden

Personal details
- Born: July 22, 1884 Sterling, Illinois, U.S.
- Died: July 19, 1967 (aged 82) New London, Connecticut, U.S.
- Awards: Pulitzer Prize (1938); Golden Rose Award

Odell Shepard (July 22, 1884 in Sterling, Illinois – July 19, 1967 in New London, Connecticut) was an American professor, poet, and politician who was the 86th Lieutenant Governor of Connecticut from 1941 to 1943. He won a Pulitzer Prize in 1938.

== Life ==
Shepard was born in Illinois. He graduated from Harvard University, and taught at the English department of Yale University. A professor of English at Trinity College from 1917 to 1946, he was a mentor to Abbie Huston Evans. He edited the works of Henry David Thoreau, Louisa May Alcott, and Henry Wadsworth Longfellow.

Shepard wrote a biography of Bronson Alcott, the father of writer Louisa May Alcott and one of the foremost Transcendentalists: Pedlar's Progress: The Life of Bronson Alcott, published by Little, Brown in 1937, for which he won the 1938 Pulitzer Prize for Biography or Autobiography.

His papers are held at Trinity College.

He died in 1967.

== Awards ==
- 1938 Pulitzer Prize for his Pedlar's Progress: The Life of Bronson Alcott, (Little, Brown and Company)
- Golden Rose Award

== Works ==
- A Lonely Flute. Houghton Mifflin Company. 1917. ISBN 9781437508536.
- The Harvest of a Quiet Eye: A Book of Digressions. Houghton Mifflin Company. 1927.
- Connecticut Past and Present. Alfred A. Knopf Inc. 1939.
- Shepard, Odell (1930). The Lore of the Unicorn. George Allen. ISBN 978-1-4375-0853-6. reprint 2008
- Shepard, Odell (1928). The Joys of Forgetting: A Book of Bagatelles. Ayer Publishing. ISBN 978-0-8369-1429-0. reprint 1969
- Shepard, Odell (1930). Thy Rod and Thy Creel. Globe Pequot. ISBN 978-0-8329-0364-9. reissue 1984

=== Biography ===
- Shepard, Odell (1937). Pedlar's Progress: The Life of Bronson Alcott. READ BOOKS. ISBN 978-1-4067-4410-1. reprint 2007

=== Coauthor ===
- Willard Shepard (1946). Holdfast Gaines. The Macmillan Company. Willard Shepard was the son of Odell Shepard.
- Willard Shepard (1951). Jenkins' Ear: A Narrative Attributed to Horace Walpole, Esq. Macmillan. Historical fiction about the War of Jenkins' Ear.

=== Edited ===
- Henry David Thoreau (1921). A Week on the Concord and Merrimack Rivers. Scribner's.
- Essays of 1925. E.V. Mitchell. 1926.
- Essays of Today 1926–1927. Century Company. 1928.
- Henry Wadsworth Longfellow (1934). Henry Wadsworth Longfellow: Representative Selections. American Book Company.

Political offices
Preceded by James L. McConaughy	Lieutenant Governor of Connecticut; 1941-1943	Succeeded by William L. Hadden
