= Charles Wilbert Snow =

American politician (1884–1977)

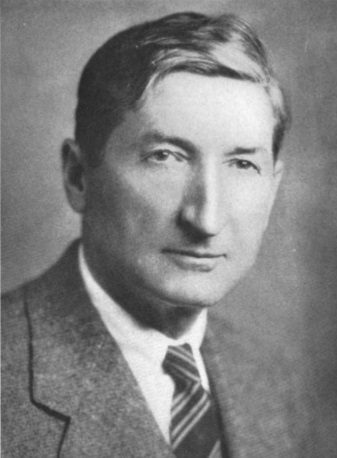
- State of Connecticut Register and Manual 1945-1946

75th Governor of Connecticut
- In office December 27, 1946 – January 8, 1947
- Lieutenant: Vacant
- Preceded by: Raymond E. Baldwin
- Succeeded by: James L. McConaughy

88th Lieutenant Governor of Connecticut
- In office January 3, 1945 – December 27, 1946
- Governor: Raymond E. Baldwin
- Preceded by: William L. Hadden
- Succeeded by: Vacant

Personal details
- Born: April 6, 1884 Whitehead Island, Maine, US
- Died: September 28, 1977 (aged 93) Spruce Head, Maine, US
- Party: Democratic
- Spouse: Jeanette Simmons Snow
- Children: 5
- Education: Bowdoin College

Charles Wilbert "Bill" Snow (April 6, 1884 – September 28, 1977) was an American poet, educator and politician. He served as the 75th governor of Connecticut. He generally went by the name Wilbert or Bill Snow, or formally as C. Wilbert Snow.

== Early life ==
Snow was born on Whitehead Island, Maine. He grew up in Whitehead Island and in neighboring Spruce Head Village. At the age of 14, Snow left school to become a lobster fisherman; he returned to school three years later after moving to Thomaston, Maine. After graduating, he began teaching in a one-room elementary school while studying at Bowdoin College. Bowdoin's President, William Dewitt Hyde helped Snow attain the scholarship he needed to finance his studies. At Bowdoin, Snow was on the debate team and editor of "The Quill", the campus literary magazine.

== Career ==
Snow earned his bachelor's degree from Bowdoin in 1907, receiving Phi Beta Kappa honors. He obtained a one-year replacement appointment teaching debate and public speaking at New York University. He enrolled at Columbia University where he obtained his master's degree in 1910, using Bowdoin's first Longfellow Fellowship. One of Snow's students was Carl Van Doren, to whom he introduced the works of Herman Melville, then in total obscurity. Van Doren, in turn, became responsible for the national rediscovery of Melville. But Snow rebelled at the rigid academic degree progression and told Ashley Horace Thorndike, head of Columbia's English Department, that the PhD "was a German invention designed to turn an art into a science." He never took his doctorate.

Snow returned to Bowdoin as temporary instructor of debate and English. From there it was on to Williams College for another one year temporary appointment. One of his favorite students was James Phinney Baxter III who shared Snow's disdain for the academic rigamarole and nearly got tossed out as a result. Some 25 years later, Baxter returned to Williams as President. At the end of that year, he was hired to teach debate and English at Miami University in Oxford, Ohio. Snow's political views were very far left for the period. It took the President of Miami only ten days to decide he talked "too plainly with undergraduates about politics and religion" and ask him to leave.

Snow was saved at that point by an invitation by a former Bowdoin friend to become an Eskimo teacher and reindeer agent in Alaska, which he did from 1911 to 1912. He spent the following six months campaigning for Woodrow Wilson in Maine and then the next six giving lectures on Alaska. At that point he received an appointment to the faculty at the University of Utah where he spent two stormy years because of his political views (opposing the reelection of Mormon Apostle Reed Smoot as United States Senator) and support of Academic Freedom more generally. While at Utah, he induced future historian Bernard DeVoto to transfer to Harvard University. From there, after six months of writing, he went on to another temporary appointment to the faculty of Indiana University.

With the opening of World War I, Snow enthusiastically signed up with the Army and eventually became an artillery captain at the Army's artillery training center at Louisville, Kentucky. He was never sent overseas and worked to get a quick release after the Armistice to accept a temporary position at Reed College. He married Jeanette Simmons on February 23, 1922. They had five sons; Charles Wilbert, John Forest, Nicholas, Stephen, and Gregory Elisha.

== Educator ==
Snow's friend, Homer Woodbridge, was then teaching at Wesleyan University in Middletown, Connecticut and managed to get Snow an offer to take charge of the debating program and teach freshman English. It nearly didn't happen when someone wrote President William Arnold Shanklin that Snow was too far to the left of center for his aggressive support of the League of Nations. Snow was called east by Shanklin but "survived the interrogation."

With a new appointment firmly in hand, Snow married Jeannette Simmons and planned a delayed honeymoon in Europe for the summer of 1922. When they returned, he had a copy of James Joyce's newly released Ulysses hidden in his luggage. Hidden because Ulysses had been "banned" in America ahead of its actual publication. Snow always asserted, with some logic because of the dates involved, that he had "smuggled the first copy of Ulysses into the United States."

While Snow "survived" at Wesleyan, the early years were a tough go for the same reason previous positions had; his leftist politics. The things that really saved him was Wesleyan having two presidents and two acting presidents during his first three years. That and the impression Snow made on students both as debating coach and as founder of The Cardinal, still Wesleyan's literary magazine. He was also aided by the administration in attracting two campus visits by his friend Carl Sandburg (whom he always claimed to have "taught" the difference between poetry and the ballads Sandburg was already expert at) and by the publication of his first book of poetry, Maine Coast, which so impressed Acting President Stephen H. Olin that he said to the Wesleyan trustees, "The man who wrote these poems cannot be evil." Ultimately, Wesleyan's new President, James L. McConaughy, who had been a friend of Snow's since they taught together at Williams, faced down the Chairman of the Board who threatened to resign if Snow wasn't fired for his stumping for presidential candidate Robert M. La Follette, and eventually made peace.

On March 26, 1925, Snow was asked to be a speaker at a public dinner for the 50th birthday of poet Robert Frost, whom he had never met before. The two became fast friends, and Frost spent several long sojourns at Wesleyan, conversing with students around the dinner table and fireplace in Snow's home. One of these was Lawrence Thompson, who later became Frost's principal biographer. Following Snow's retirement from Wesleyan in 1952, he was a visiting professor at Spelman and Morehouse Colleges and induced Frost to come south to work with the students there. Frost and Snow continued to meet regularly and to share private critiques of each other's poetry up until Frost's death in 1963, only a couple of weeks after their last meeting.

== Politician ==
Soon after settling in Middletown, Snow became involved in local Democratic Party politics and eventually state politics as an ally of Governor Wilbur Cross, retired Dean of Yale University. In 1944 there was a move to nominate Snow for governor, but it came apart at the convention, and he was nominated for lieutenant governor on a ticket headed by former Governor Robert Hurley. Hurley lost badly to Wesleyan graduate Raymond E. Baldwin, but Snow took the post of lieutenant governor. Two years later he took the gubernatorial nomination from Chester Bowles and Thomas Dodd in a last minute surprise that left The Hartford Courant with a first page headline that read: "Bowles Nominated. The Professor Slinks Back to the Cloistered Halls of Wesleyan." He ended up losing to then Wesleyan President James L. McConaughy in an unusually gentlemanly race. Governor Baldwin had won the race for the U.S. Senate over former Governor Cross and resigned as governor on December 27, 1946. That gave Snow thirteen days to serve as governor before McConaughy's inauguration on January 8, 1947. His last effort in state politics was a run for the U.S. Senate in 1950.

== Later life ==
Snow also became president of the Connecticut Association Board of Education in 1940. In 1947 the Wesleyan University class of 1927, as their 20th reunion gift to their university, provided the funds to their then aged professor to write his autobiography. After much work and effort, he completed his autobiography published as "Codline's Child" named after the midwife who had birthed him, his parents being unable to afford bringing a doctor out to White Head Island. Wesleyan University also published Snow's Collected Poems in 1963. He was a delegate to the Connecticut state constitutional convention, 2nd District, 1965.

Snow served as educational commissioner and chairman of the Middletown Board of Education for over 30 years. An elementary school in Middletown is named for Wilbert Snow. He also played a major role in founding the Middlesex Community College.

== Death and legacy ==
Snow died at Spruce Head, Knox County, Maine, on September 28, 1977, aged 93 years, 175 days. He is interred at Ocean View Cemetery, South Thomaston, Knox County, Maine.

His great-grandson is writer Ross Douthat, an op-ed columnist for The New York Times.

== Published works ==
- Maine Coast, 1923
- The Inner Harbor, 1926
- Down East, 1932
- Selected Poems, 1935
- Before the Wind (prior to 1957)
- Maine Tides (prior to 1957)

*Sonnets to Steve and Other Poems, 1957

- Collected Poems, 1963
- Codline's Child, 1974
- Spruce Head, 1959

Party political offices
Preceded by Robert A. Hurley	Democratic nominee for Governor of Connecticut; 1946	Succeeded by Chester Bowles
Political offices
Preceded by William L. Hadden	Lieutenant Governor of Connecticut; 1945–1946	Succeeded by Vacant
Preceded by Raymond E. Baldwin	Governor of Connecticut; 1946–1947	Succeeded by James L. McConaughy
