= 1948 Louisiana lieutenant gubernatorial election =

- April 20, 1948
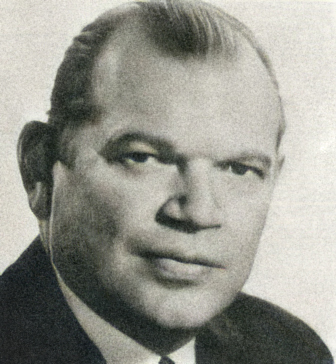
Nominee	Bill Dodd
Party	Democratic
Popular vote	75,883
Percentage	100.00%
- Parish results Dodd: 90–100%
Lieutenant Governor before election
J. Emile Verret
Democratic
Elected Lieutenant Governor
Bill Dodd
Democratic

The 1948 Louisiana lieutenant gubernatorial election was held on April 20, 1948, in order to elect the lieutenant governor of Louisiana. Democratic nominee and incumbent member of the Louisiana House of Representatives Bill Dodd won the election as he ran unopposed.

== General election ==
On election day, April 20, 1948, Democratic nominee Bill Dodd won the election with 75,883 votes as he ran unopposed, thereby retaining Democratic control over the office of lieutenant governor. Dodd was sworn in as the 42nd lieutenant governor of Louisiana on May 11, 1948.

=== Results ===
Louisiana lieutenant gubernatorial election, 1948
Party	Candidate	Votes	%
Democratic	Bill Dodd	75,883	100.00
Total votes		75,883	100.00
Democratic hold			
