= 1948 Venezuelan municipal elections =

Elections to local municipal councils were held across Venezuela on May 9, 1948, except for the Federal District and the Federal Territories were local authorities had been elected in December 1947. These were the first municipal elections with direct universal and secret suffrage held separately from the national presidential or legislative elections.

Participation declined compared with the presidential and legislative elections the previous year. As it was the third election in two years, there was considerable voter fatigue. In total 693,154 people cast their votes.

The elections resulted in an overwhelming victory for the Democratic Action party, following the pattern of the 1946-1947 elections. COPEI won the election in the Táchira state and its local affiliate the Republican Federal Union won the polls in the Mérida state. Most of the COPEI votes came from these two states, where the party won majorities in almost all of the municipal councils. The Communist Party gained representation in councils in the Federal District, Anzoátegui, Lara and Zulia. The Revolutionary Party of the Proletariat, the so-called 'Black Communists', won a seat in Anzoátegui.

== Results ==
=== National summary ===
Party	Votes	%	Councillors elected
Democratic Action	491,724	70.82	727
Copei	109,682	15.79	105
Republican Federal Union	37,573	5.41	105
Democratic Republican Union	26,502	3.82	22
Communist Party of Venezuela	23,567	3.39	12
Revolutionary Party of the Proletariat (Communist)	3,697	0.53	*
Socialist Party of Venezuela	597	0.09	*
Total	693,154	100	868

- "Others" obtained 2 seats in total.

=== State-wise distribution of seats ===
State	AD	COPEI /UFR	URD	PCV	Others
Anzoátegui	55	1	1	2	1
Apure	20				
Aragua	40	2			
Barinas	38	11			
Bolívar	25				
Carabobo	31	3			
Cojedes	33		2		
Falcón	55	1	4		
Guárico	35				
Lara	38	3		2	
Mérida	19	23			
Miranda	47	3			
Monagas	34				1
Nueva Esparta	20		10		
Portuguesa	38	1		1	
Sucre	58		5	1	
Táchira	15	34			
Trujillo	27	13			
Yaracuy	35			1	
Zulia	64	10		5	
