= George T. Mickelson =

Governor of South Dakota from 1947 to 1951

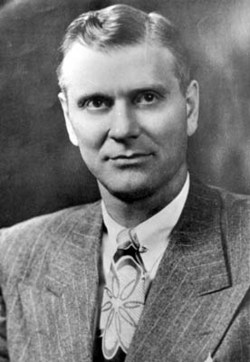

Chief Judge of the United States District Court for the District of South Dakota
- In office 1954–1965
- Preceded by: Office established
- Succeeded by: Axel J. Beck

Judge of the United States District Court for the District of South Dakota
- In office December 9, 1953 – February 28, 1965
- Appointed by: Dwight D. Eisenhower
- Preceded by: Seat established by 65 Stat. 710
- Succeeded by: Fred Joseph Nichol

18th Governor of South Dakota
- In office January 7, 1947 – January 2, 1951
- Lieutenant: Sioux K. Grigsby; Rex A. Terry
- Preceded by: Merrell Q. Sharpe
- Succeeded by: Sigurd Anderson

16th Attorney General of South Dakota
- In office 1943–1947
- Governor: Merrell Q. Sharpe
- Preceded by: Leo A. Temmey
- Succeeded by: Sigurd Anderson

Personal details
- Born: George Theodore Mickelson; July 23, 1903 Selby, South Dakota, U.S.
- Died: February 28, 1965 (aged 61) Sioux Falls, South Dakota U.S.
- Resting place: Woodlawn Cemetery; Sioux Falls, South Dakota
- Party: Republican
- Children: George S. Mickelson
- Education: University of South Dakota School of Law (LL.B.)

George Theodore Mickelson (July 23, 1903 – February 28, 1965) was an American lawyer, 16th Attorney General of South Dakota and 18th Governor of South Dakota, and a United States district judge of the United States District Court for the District of South Dakota. He is the patriarch of the prominent Mickelson family of South Dakota.

== Early life and education ==
George T. Mickelson was born near Selby in Walworth County, South Dakota, the son of Emma L. (Craig) and George M. Mickelson. His father was a Norwegian immigrant, and his maternal grandparents were German. Mickelson was the first Governor of South Dakota to be born in the twentieth century. Mickelson received a Bachelor of Laws from the University of South Dakota School of Law in 1927. He was a member of the Lambda Chi Alpha social fraternity. He did not take the bar exam as he was admitted to the South Dakota bar under the state's diploma privilege. That year he returned to Selby to practice law. He married Madge Turner and they had four children.

== Career ==
Prior to serving as governor, Mickelson, a Republican, served as State's Attorney for Walworth County from 1933 to 1936. He served in the South Dakota House of Representatives from 1937 to 1943 and was Speaker of the House in his last term.

He then served as South Dakota Attorney General from 1943 to 1947.

=== 1942 Attorney General election ===
On May 9, 1942, Mickelson announced his candidacy for Attorney General. On June 8, 1942, Mickelson won the nomination at the convention in a field of five candidates on the second vote with 110,090 votes; 31,359 votes for Harold O. Lovre of Hayti; 17,049 for William J Metzger of Olivet; 6,773 votes for Assistant Attorney General Erwin R. Erickson of Vermillion; and 1,610 votes for E.B. Adams of Hot Springs.

Mickelson defeated Democrat Lynn Fellows of Plankinton by a vote count of 108,155 to 62,527 votes.

=== 1944 Attorney General election ===
On February 22, 1944, Mickelson declared that he would run for re-election.

On August 1, 1944, Fred Wheeler of Custer was unopposed and nominated for Attorney General at the Democratic Convention in Aberdeen.

Mickelson was re-elected defeating Democrat Wheeler by a count of 137,311 to 83,441 votes.

=== Gubernatorial elections ===
Mickelson became Governor of South Dakota in 1947, and served until 1951.

== Presidential run ==
Mickelson ran as a favorite-son candidate in the 1952 South Dakota presidential primary, supporting Dwight D. Eisenhower's national bid, and lost narrowly to Eisenhower's chief rival, Senator Robert A. Taft of Ohio.

== Federal judicial service ==
Mickelson received a recess appointment from President Dwight D. Eisenhower on December 9, 1953, to the United States District Court for the District of South Dakota, to a new seat authorized by 65 Stat. 710 following the certification of Alfred Lee Wyman as disabled. He was nominated to the same position by President Eisenhower on January 11, 1954. He was confirmed by the United States Senate on February 9, 1954, and received his commission the next day. He served as Chief Judge from 1954 to 1965. He served until his death on February 28, 1965.

=== Notable clerk ===
Among Mickelson's judicial law clerks was Roger Leland Wollman.

== Personal life ==
Mickelson is the patriarch of the prominent Mickelson family of South Dakota. Mickelson's son, George S. Mickelson, served as Governor of South Dakota from 1987 to 1993. They are the only father and son duo to serve in that office in the history of South Dakota. His grandson Mark Mickelson served as Speaker of the House of Representatives in the South Dakota State Legislature from 2017 to 2018.

== Death ==
Mickelson died on February 28, 1965, and is buried in Woodlawn Cemetery in Sioux Falls, South Dakota.

Soon after his death the University of South Dakota named a new dormitory after him, George T. Mickelson Hall (better known as Mickelson Hall) opened in 1966 as a part of the larger North Complex.

Party political offices
Preceded by Leo A. Temmey	Republican nominee for Attorney General of South Dakota; 1942, 1944	Succeeded by Sigurd Anderson
Preceded by Merrell Q. Sharpe	Republican nominee for Governor of South Dakota; 1946, 1948	Succeeded by Sigurd Anderson
Political offices
Preceded by Merrell Q. Sharpe	Governor of South Dakota; 1947–1951	Succeeded by Sigurd Anderson
Legal offices
Preceded by Leo A. Temmey	Attorney General of South Dakota; 1943–1947	Succeeded by Sigurd Anderson
Preceded by Seat established by 65 Stat. 710	Judge of the United States District Court for the District of South Dakota; 1953–1965	Succeeded by Fred Joseph Nichol
Preceded by Office established	Chief Judge of the United States District Court for the District of South Dakota; 1954–1965	Succeeded by Axel J. Beck
