= Chester B. Bowles =

American politician (1901–1986)

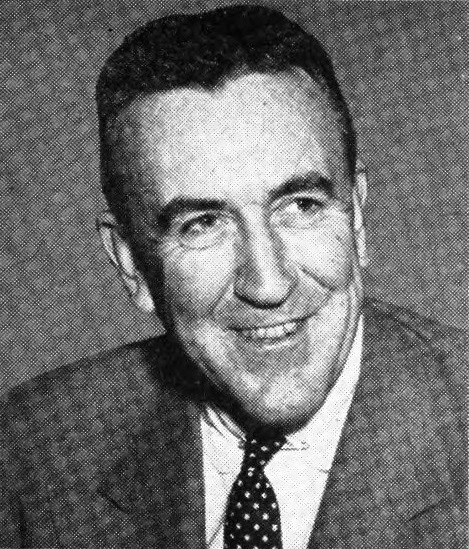

3rd and 8th United States Ambassador to India
- In office July 19, 1963 – April 21, 1969
- President: John F. Kennedy; Lyndon B. Johnson; Richard Nixon
- Preceded by: John Kenneth Galbraith
- Succeeded by: Kenneth B. Keating
- In office October 10, 1951 – March 21, 1953
- President: Harry S. Truman; Dwight D. Eisenhower
- Preceded by: Loy W. Henderson
- Succeeded by: George V. Allen

22nd United States Under Secretary of State
- In office January 25, 1961 – December 3, 1961
- President: John F. Kennedy
- Preceded by: C. Douglas Dillon
- Succeeded by: George W. Ball

Member of the U.S. House of Representatives from Connecticut's 2nd district
- In office January 3, 1959 – January 3, 1961
- Preceded by: Horace Seely-Brown Jr.
- Succeeded by: Horace Seely-Brown Jr.

78th Governor of Connecticut
- In office January 5, 1949 – January 3, 1951
- Lieutenant: William T. Carroll
- Preceded by: James C. Shannon
- Succeeded by: John Davis Lodge

Administrator of the Office of Price Administration
- In office 1943–1946
- President: Franklin D. Roosevelt; Harry S. Truman
- Preceded by: Prentiss M. Brown
- Succeeded by: Paul A. Porter

Personal details
- Born: Chester Bliss Bowles; April 5, 1901 Springfield, Massachusetts, U.S.
- Died: May 25, 1986 (aged 85) Essex, Connecticut, U.S.
- Party: Democratic
- Spouses: Julia Fisk (m. 1925; div. 1933); Dorothy Stebbins (m. 1934)
- Children: 5, including Sam
- Education: Yale University (BS)

Chester Bliss Bowles (April 5, 1901 – May 25, 1986) was an American diplomat and ambassador, governor of Connecticut, congressman and co-founder of a major advertising agency, Benton & Bowles, now part of Publicis Groupe. Bowles is best known for his influence on American foreign policy during Cold War years, when he argued that economic assistance to the Third World was the best means to fight communism, and even more important, to create a more peaceable world order.

During World War II, Bowles held high office in Washington as director of the Office of Price Administration, and control of setting consumer prices. Just after the war, he was the chief of the Office of Economic Stabilization, but had great difficulty controlling inflation. Moving into state politics, he served a term as governor of Connecticut from 1949 to 1951. He promoted liberal programs in education and housing, but was defeated for reelection by conservative backlash.

As ambassador to India, he established a good relationship with Prime Minister Jawaharlal Nehru, an emerging leader of the non-aligned movement. Bowles promoted rapid economic industrialization in India, and repeatedly called on Washington to help finance it. However, Washington was angered by India's neutrality, and limited funding to literacy and health programs. During the Eisenhower years, 1953–1960, Bowles organized liberal Democratic opposition, and served as a foreign policy advisor to Adlai Stevenson and John F. Kennedy.

Bowles served as Kennedy's Under Secretary of State in 1961 which enabled him to staff American embassies with liberal intellectuals and activists. However, his liberalism proved too strong for Kennedy, who demoted him to a nominal job as roving ambassador to the Third World in 1961. Kennedy named him as ambassador to India again, 1963–1969, where he helped improve agricultural productivity and fight local famines.

== Education and early career ==
Chester Bowles was born in Springfield, Massachusetts, to Charles Allen Bowles and Nellie Seaver (Harris). Theirs was an old Yankee family. His grandfather Samuel Bowles was a leading Republican spokesman as editor of the Springfield Republican. His father made a middle-class living as a salesman for the wood pulp industry. Chester's parents were arch-conservative Republicans who hated and feared big government. However, Chester's political views were shaped more by his aunt Ruth Standish Baldwin, who was a socialist, pacifist, friend of Norman Thomas, and leader in the early civil rights movements for Blacks. She inspired him to read deeply in politics, civil rights, and international affairs. Chester attended elite private schools – The Choate School (now Choate Rosemary Hall) in Wallingford, Connecticut, graduating in 1919. He matriculated at the Sheffield Scientific School at Yale University, earning a Bachelor of Science degree in 1924. Decades later he recalled the Yale years "as a period of overwork, confusion and missed opportunities....It was unfashionable in or out of college to think much about anything."

After working after graduation as a reporter for the newspaper in Springfield, Massachusetts owned by his family, Bowles took a minor position with the United States consulate in Shanghai, but soon returned to the U.S. because of his father's illness.

== Advertising career success ==
Bowles became a copywriter for $25 per week at the Batten Company, an advertising agency in New York City that later became BBDO, the third-largest agency in the US. In 1929, Bowles established the Benton & Bowles advertising agency with William Benton, who was a fellow Batten employee. Despite the difficult economic environment of Great Depression, by the mid-1930s Benton & Bowles was a multimillion-dollar company. Benton & Bowles created the radio soap opera, offering specialized programming to receptive demographic groups. This allowed Benton & Bowles to create advertising campaigns to promote their clients' products to this targeted radio audience.

The New York Times referred to Bowles' career as an advertising executive as "brilliant". He and his business partner, Mr. Benton, signed major U.S. companies as advertising clients for Benton & Bowles, including General Foods, Procter & Gamble and Bristol Myers. Bowles was appointed chairman of the board in 1936. By 1941, the company reportedly earned an annual profit of more than $250,000. Bowles sold his shares in Benton & Bowles for a substantial profit. He became a multi-millionaire and fulfilled his dream by quitting the business world at age 40. He did not much enjoy the day-to-day job, saying in his autobiography:

I honestly believe that I would have been happier and more effective if I had gone into public service immediately following my graduation from college. On the other hand, I realize that the grinding effort that I put into those early years enabled my family and me to build a capital reserve which has assured us far greater independence and made it possible for me to travel, to write, to speak my mind, and to move from one career to the next as various challenges presented themselves.

Because of his strong support for the New Deal domestic policies of the Roosevelt Administration, Bowles worked closely with First Lady Eleanor Roosevelt on several key policy initiatives and programs, while continuing his job at Benton & Bowles.

== Career during World War II ==
Initially, Bowles was opposed to the United States getting involved in World War II and joined an opposition group, the America First Committee. When the United States entered World War II in December 1941, he was rejected for health reasons when he tried to join the Navy.

Bowles then took a job as the state of Connecticut's rationing administrator in 1942. He becoming state director of price administration later that year, and then general manager. He was appointed by President Roosevelt in 1943 as administrator of the Office of Price Administration and served in that position until 1946. He played the major role in rationing consumer goods and setting prices in an effort to hold down inflation and guarantee that poor families were not outbid for the necessities of life. He served as a member of the War Production Board and the Petroleum Board for War.

== Diplomatic and political career ==
In 1946, he was appointed director of the Office of Economic Stabilization and became chairman of the Economic Stabilization Board for President Harry S. Truman. Bowles ran unsuccessfully for the Democratic gubernatorial nomination in Connecticut that year. Also in 1946, he became one of the American delegates to the first conference of United Nations Economic, Scientific and Cultural Organization UNESCO in Paris. Bowles served as special assistant to UN Secretary General Trygve Lie in 1947 and 1948. During these years, the UN General Assembly met in session at Lake Success, New York on Long Island, as the UN building in Manhattan was not completed until 1952 He continued with the United Nations as international chairman of the United Nations Children's Appeal from 1948 to 1951. .

Bowles was elected to the governorship of Connecticut in 1948, defeating James C. Shannon, and served one term, during which time he signed into law an end to segregation in the state national guard. During his term, Bowles was also active in improving education, mental health, housing and workmen's compensation. He lost a bitter re-election campaign to John Davis Lodge, during which his opponent painted him as an extreme liberal.

He was appointed as U.S. Ambassador to India and Nepal by President Truman, serving from 1951 to 1953. He developed a close relationship with Prime Minister Nehru, who otherwise distrusted Americans. Indeed, Bowles highly appreciated Nehru's positions, which caused him friction with the State Department.

During the Eisenhower years, Bowles was a leading Democratic liberal intellectual, especially on foreign policy matters, writing numerous articles, giving speeches, and advising Adlai Stevenson and John F. Kennedy. Bowles won a seat in the House of Representatives for Connecticut's second district and served one term, from January 3, 1959, to January 3, 1961.

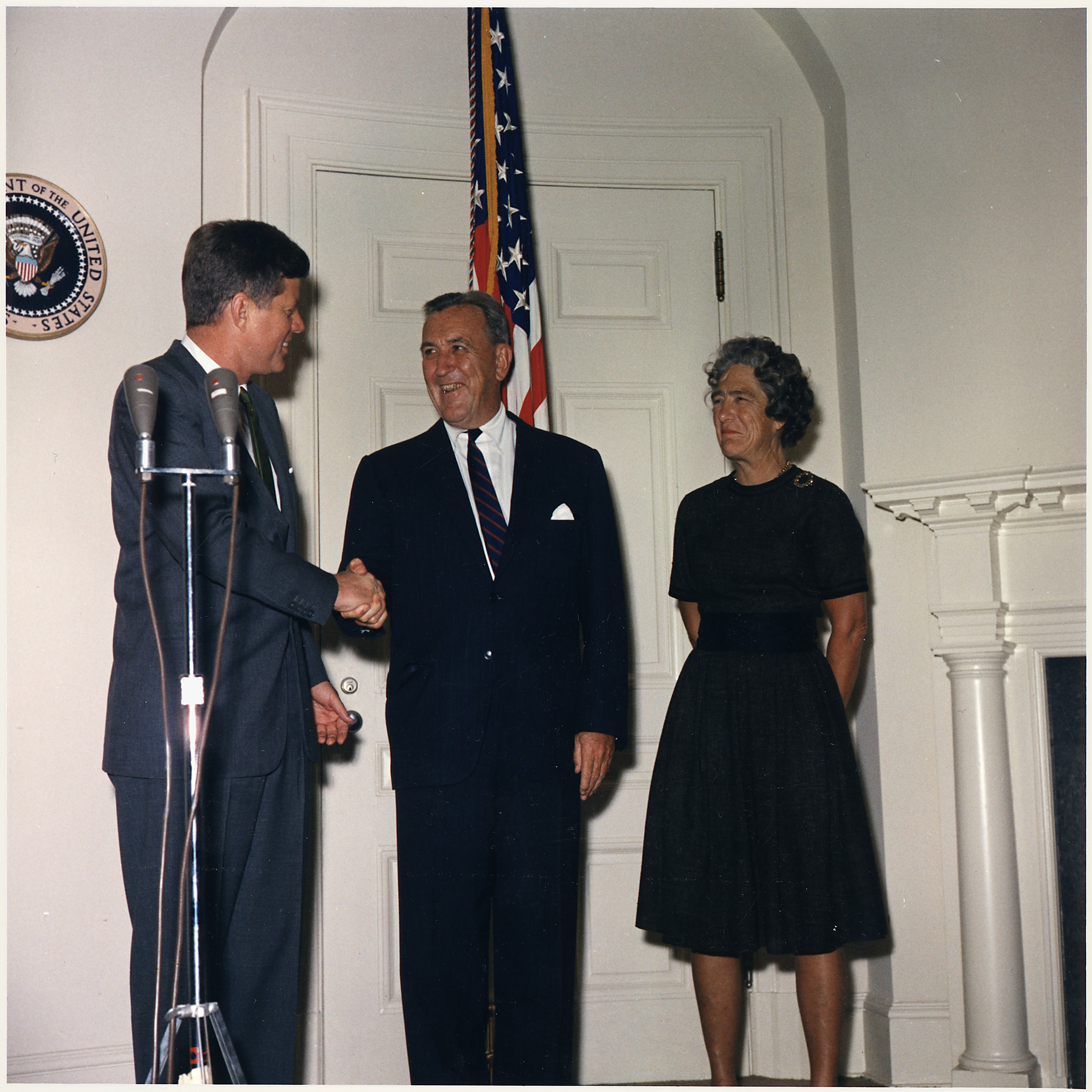
Bowles at his 1961 swearing in as President Kennedy's Special Representative.

Bowles was selected in 1960 as a foreign policy adviser to Senator John F. Kennedy during Kennedy's campaign for president of the US. Bowles served as chairman of the platform committee for the Democratic National Convention that year in Los Angeles, California.

President Kennedy appointed Bowles to the post of Under Secretary of State in 1961. That November, Bowles was removed as a consequence of the touted perception in the Kennedy Administration that he failed to carry out key duties as an administrator in the Department of State, but actually, to quote John Kenneth Galbraith, for "his courage and his conscience," and because of his opposition to the Bay of Pigs Invasion. His removal was made part of a broader bureaucratic reshuffle, which became known as the "Thanksgiving Day Massacre". In early December 1961, he was replaced by George Ball as Under Secretary. In December 1961, Bowles was named President Kennedy's Special Representative and Adviser on African, Asian, and Latin American Affairs, and Ambassador at Large. Ostensibly this new position was a promotion, but this job was recognized by most experts involved at the time (and by historians in later years) as a demotion. Bowles was made Ambassador to India for the second time on July 19, 1963. He continued in this position through the remainder of Kennedy's presidency, and for the duration of Lyndon B. Johnson's Administration. Bowles was a passionate advocate for stronger relations between the United States and India. He enjoyed good relations with India's first prime minister, Jawaharlal Nehru. Bowles strongly believed that the United States and India shared fundamental democratic values.

In March 1967, Bowles was formally petitioned for political asylum by Svetlana Alliluyeva, a writer and the only daughter of Soviet leader Joseph Stalin, which was granted. Bowles arranged for her to leave India immediately on a middle-of-the-night flight to Rome. She traveled to Switzerland and eventually on to the U.S., where she died in 2011.

Bowles completed his service as Ambassador to India on April 21, 1969, during the early days of the presidency of Richard Nixon.

== Political commitment ==
Chester Bowles was well known for his oft-repeated phrase, that he always had "a feeling for the people's side." He said that his grandfather and great-grandfather also used that phrase in their careers in journalism as newspaper owners. Bowles showed expertise in stagecraft, public relations and promotion, both during his career in advertising, and throughout his work as a diplomat, elected official and appointed official. For many years he was a successful author and lecturer, giving him platforms to promote his beliefs and views of politics, policy and the quest for peace. Early on, while a student at Yale College, his goal was to join the United States foreign service to become a career diplomat. Even while a business executive in the late 1920s and throughout the 1930s, he fostered a keen, growing interest in domestic issues, international issues, and a wide array of other political issues of the day. With the election of Franklin Roosevelt to the presidency in 1932, Bowles saw in the New Deal policies many ideas and concepts that he liked and would promote for decades.

Because of the strength and wealth of the United States, Bowles believed that it was essential for America to further develop vigorous, sizable foreign aid programs to a large number of countries. Bowles was a long-time advocate for peace. Because of that deep-rooted sense that peace was vital to survival and happiness of the world's population, Bowles was opposed to the Vietnam War and to the involvement of the United States in Southeast Asia. European reconstruction was vital, he believed, after the massive devastation of World War II. That devastation was due in no small measure to the bombing and other military activities conducted by the US and its Allies over the years of conflict in Europe, in his view. Bowles understood that the Nazi regime of Germany—and others in Axis alliance—needed to be defeated. Yet that meant destruction of buildings, infrastructure, deaths of civilians. Shortly after the war, Bowles saw the hampered abilities of the countries to produce food, clothe their people, provide education, sanitation and health care. Jobs were scarce and opportunities were limited for most people. Yet he was convinced that after the war the United States had a moral obligation to assist with the re-building of affected countries and with meeting the humanitarian needs of the affected people.

Civil rights was of paramount importance to Chester Bowles. As a white liberal from the Northeast, he used various tools to foment change that encouraged independence, freedom and equality for African-Americans and other minorities, supporting changes in the laws advocating for enlightened judicial decisions affecting civil rights. He wrote articles and books that promoted civil rights and agitation for change and improvement, including in a book entitled "What Negroes Can Learn from Gandhi" published in 1958. He advanced these rights by supporting various government programs and private philanthropic initiatives.

== Personal life ==
Bowles married twice and had children by both marriages. His first wife was Julia Fisk. They married in 1925 and divorced in 1933. The marriage produced two children, a son, Chester Jr., and a daughter, Barbara. Chester Bowles Jr. was an architect in San Francisco.

In 1934, the year after his divorce, Bowles married Dorothy Stebbens. They had three children together: two daughters, Cynthia and Sally, and a son, Samuel. Samuel Bowles is a well-known economist, while Sally Bowles (1938–2011) continued her father's tradition of public service, which lifelong dedication she attributed to her years as a school-girl studying in a public school in India, where she and her siblings were the only non-Indian students.

A public housing project in northwest Hartford, Connecticut, Bowles Park, is named in Bowles's honor. Connecticut Route 9 between Old Saybrook and Cromwell is also designated as the Chester Bowles Highway.

== Death ==
Bowles died at the age of 85, on May 25, 1986, in Essex, Connecticut. He had had Parkinson's disease for 22 years (diagnosed when he was Ambassador to India). He also had a cerebrovascular accident (a stroke) the week prior to his death. His grave is in the River View Cemetery in Essex.

== Bibliography ==
- Tomorrow Without Fear (1946)
- Ambassador's Report (1954)
- The New Dimensions of Peace (1955)
- Africa's Challenge to America (1956)
- What Negroes Can Learn From Gandhi (1958)
- Ideas, People, and Peace (1958)
- The Coming Political Breakthrough (1959)
- The Conscience of a Liberal (1962)
- The Makings of a Just Society (1963)
- Promises to Keep: My Years in Public Life (1971)

Government offices
Preceded by Prentiss M. Brown	Administrator of the Office of Price Administration; 1943–1946	Office abolished
Party political offices
Preceded by Charles Wilbert Snow	Democratic nominee for Governor of Connecticut; 1948, 1950	Succeeded by Abraham Ribicoff
Political offices
Preceded by James C. Shannon	Governor of Connecticut; January 5, 1949 – January 3, 1951	Succeeded by John Davis Lodge
Preceded by C. Douglas Dillon	United States Under Secretary of State; January 25, 1961 – December 3, 1961	Succeeded by George W. Ball
U.S. House of Representatives
Preceded by Horace Seely-Brown Jr.	Member of the U.S. House of Representatives from Connecticut's 2nd congressional district January 3, 1959 – January 3, 1961	Succeeded by Horace Seely-Brown Jr.
Diplomatic posts
Preceded by Loy W. Henderson	United States Ambassador to India; October 10, 1951 – March 21, 1953	Succeeded by George V. Allen
Preceded by John Kenneth Galbraith	United States Ambassador to India; July 19, 1963 – April 21, 1969	Succeeded by Kenneth Keating
