= 1948 Connecticut gubernatorial election =

- November 2, 1948
- Turnout: 86.16%
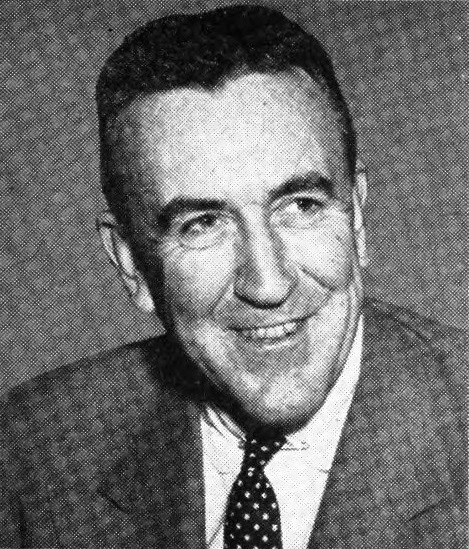

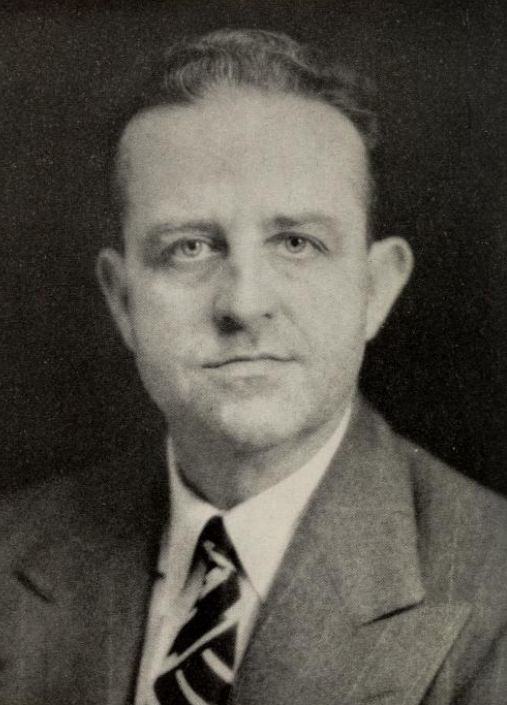
Nominee	Chester Bowles	James C. Shannon
Party	Democratic	Republican
Popular vote	431,746	429,071
Percentage	49.31%	49.00%
- Bowles: 40–50% 50–60% 60–70% Shannon: 40–50% 50–60% 60–70% 70–80% 80–90%
Governor before election
James C. Shannon
Republican
Elected Governor
Chester Bowles
Democratic

The 1948 Connecticut gubernatorial election was held on November 2, 1948. Democratic nominee Chester Bowles narrowly defeated incumbent Republican James C. Shannon with 49.31% of the vote.

== General election ==
=== Candidates ===
Major party candidates

- Chester Bowles, Democratic
- James C. Shannon, Republican

Other candidates

- Morris Chertov, Socialist Workers
- Joseph Mackay, Socialist Labor
- Jasper McLevy, Socialist

The Progressive Party nominated Thomas I. Emerson as their gubernatorial candidate, but planned to withdraw if an acceptable candidate was selected by the Democrats. Chester B. Bowles was deemed as acceptable, and Emerson withdrew.

=== Results ===
1948 Connecticut gubernatorial election
Party	Candidate	Votes	%
Democratic	Chester Bowles	431,746	49.31%
Republican	James C. Shannon (incumbent)	429,071	49.00%
Socialist	Jasper McLevy	12,662	1.45%
Socialist Labor	Joseph Mackay	1,363	0.16%
Socialist Workers	Morris Chertov	778	0.09%
Total votes		875,620	100.00%
Democratic gain from Republican			

== Works cited ==
- Schmidt, Karl (1960). Henry A. Wallace: Quixotic Crusade 1948. Syracuse University Press.
