= 1948 Delaware gubernatorial election =

- November 2, 1948
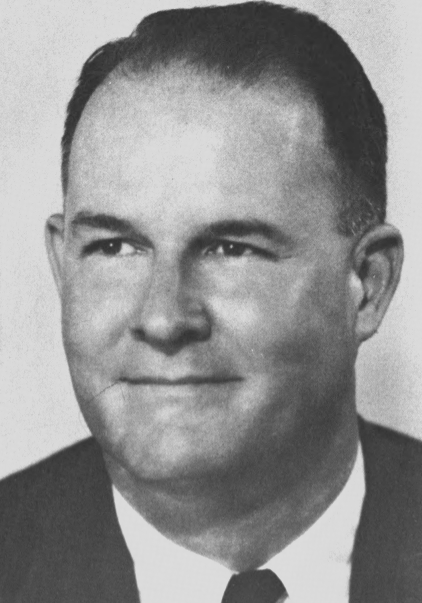

Nominee	Elbert N. Carvel	Hyland P. George
Party	Democratic	Republican
Popular vote	75,339	64,996
Percentage	53.69%	46.31%
- County results Carvel: 50–60%
Governor before election
Walter W. Bacon
Republican
Elected Governor
Elbert N. Carvel
Democratic

The 1948 Delaware gubernatorial election was held on November 2, 1948.

Incumbent Republican Governor Walter W. Bacon was term-limited, having served two consecutive terms.

Democratic nominee Elbert N. Carvel defeated Republican nominee Hyland P. George with 53.69% of the vote.

== Nominations ==
Nominations were made by party conventions.

=== Democratic nomination ===
The Democratic convention was held on August 24 at Dover.

==== Candidate ====
- Elbert N. Carvel, incumbent Lieutenant Governor, nominated unanimously

=== Republican nomination ===
The Republican convention was held on August 11 at Dover.

==== Candidate ====
- Hyland P. George, road building contractor, nominated by acclamation

==== Withdrew ====
- John S. Isaacs

== General election ==
=== Results ===
1948 Delaware gubernatorial election
Party	Candidate	Votes	%	±%
Democratic	Elbert N. Carvel	75,339	53.69%	
Republican	Hyland P. George	64,996	46.31%	
Majority		10,343	7.37%	
Turnout		140,335	100.00%	
Democratic gain from Republican		Swing		

== Bibliography ==
- Gubernatorial Elections, 1787-1997. Washington, D.C.: Congressional Quarterly Inc. 1998. ISBN 1-56802-396-0.
- Glashan, Roy R. (1979). American Governors and Gubernatorial Elections, 1775-1978. Meckler Books. ISBN 0-930466-17-9.
