= 1946 South Dakota gubernatorial election =

- November 5, 1946
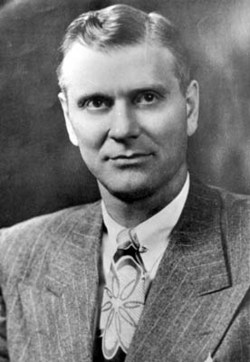

Nominee	George T. Mickelson	Richard Haeder
Party	Republican	Democratic
Popular vote	108,998	53,294
Percentage	67.16%	32.84%
- County results Mickelson: 50–60% 60–70% 70–80% 80–90% >90% Haeder: 50–60% 80–90%
Governor before election
Merrell Q. Sharpe
Republican
Elected Governor
George T. Mickelson
Republican

The 1946 South Dakota gubernatorial election was held on November 5, 1946. Incumbent Republican Governor Merrell Q. Sharpe ran for re-election to a third term, but was defeated in the Republican primary by Attorney General George T. Mickelson. In the general election, Mickelson faced farmer Richard Haeder, the Democratic nominee. In part because of South Dakota's growing trend toward the Republican Party, and because of the national Republican landslide, Mickelson easily defeated Haeder, winning 67% of the vote to Haeder's 33%.

== Democratic primary ==
=== Candidates ===
- Richard Haeder, farmer and president of the South Dakota Rural Electrification Association
- Edward Prchal, former member of the South Dakota Board of Regents, 1942 Democratic candidate for the U.S. Senate
- Jennie M. O'Hern, Democratic National Committeewoman

=== Results ===
Democratic primary results
Party	Candidate	Votes	%
Democratic	Richard Haeder	8,093	41.06%
Democratic	Edward Prchal	6,563	33.30%
Democratic	Jennie M. O'Hern	5,053	25.64%
Total votes		19,709	100.00%

== Republican primary ==
=== Candidates ===
- George T. Mickelson, incumbent Attorney General of South Dakota
- Merrell Q. Sharpe, incumbent Governor
- Millard G. Scott, former State Rural Credit Director, 1942 Republican candidate for Governor

=== Results ===
Republican primary results
Party	Candidate	Votes	%
Republican	George T. Mickelson	32,515	44.98%
Republican	Merrell Q. Sharpe (inc.)	23,325	32.27%
Republican	Millard G. Scott	16,442	22.75%
Total votes		72,282	100.00%

== General election ==
=== Results ===
1946 South Dakota gubernatorial election
Party	Candidate	Votes	%	±%
Republican	George T. Mickelson	108,998	67.16%	+1.66%
Democratic	Richard Haeder	53,294	32.84%	−1.66%
Majority		55,704	34.32%	+3.31%
Turnout		162,292	100.00%	
Republican hold				

== Bibliography ==
- Gubernatorial Elections, 1787-1997. Washington, D.C.: Congressional Quarterly Inc. 1998. ISBN 1-56802-396-0.
