= 1948 South Dakota gubernatorial election =

- November 2, 1948
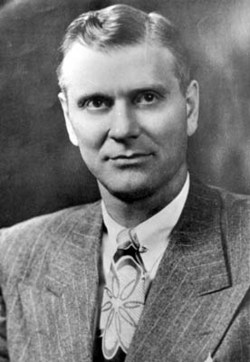

Nominee	George T. Mickelson	Harold J. Volz
Party	Republican	Democratic
Popular vote	149,883	95,489
Percentage	61.08%	38.92%
- County results Mickelson: 50–60% 60–70% 70–80% 80–90% Volz: 50–60% 70–80%
Governor before election
George Theodore Mickelson
Republican
Elected Governor
George Theodore Mickelson
Republican

The 1948 South Dakota gubernatorial election was held on November 2, 1948. Incumbent Republican Governor George T. Mickelson ran for re-election to a second term. He was opposed by Democrat Harold J. Volz, a businessman and the former chairman of the Tripp County Democratic Party. Both Mickelson and Volz were the only candidates of their parties to file for Governor, ensuring that they won their respective nominations unopposed and removing the race from the primary ballot. In the general election, Mickelson had little difficulty defeating Volz. Though Republican presidential nominee Thomas E. Dewey only narrowly won the state over President Harry S. Truman, Mickelson's popularity allowed him to win re-election in a landslide, receiving 61% of the vote to Volz's 39%.

== General election ==
=== Results ===
1948 South Dakota gubernatorial election
Party	Candidate	Votes	%	±%
Republican	George T. Mickelson (inc.)	149,883	61.08%	−6.08%
Democratic	Harold J. Volz	95,489	38.92%	+6.08%
Majority		54,394	22.16%	−12.16%
Turnout		245,372	100.00%	
Republican hold				

== Bibliography ==
- Gubernatorial Elections, 1787-1997. Washington, D.C.: Congressional Quarterly Inc. 1998. ISBN 1-56802-396-0.
