= James C. Shannon =

American politician (1896–1980)

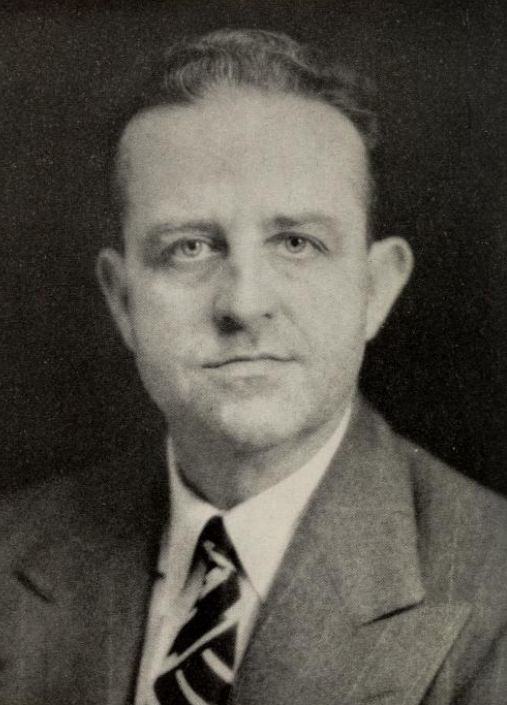

77th Governor of Connecticut
- In office March 7, 1948 – January 5, 1949
- Lieutenant: Robert E. Parsons
- Preceded by: James L. McConaughy
- Succeeded by: Chester Bowles

89th Lieutenant Governor of Connecticut
- In office January 8, 1947 – March 7, 1948
- Governor: James L. McConaughy
- Preceded by: Vacant
- Succeeded by: Robert E. Parsons

Personal details
- Born: July 21, 1896 Bridgeport, Connecticut, U.S.
- Died: March 6, 1980 (aged 83) Fairfield, Connecticut, U.S.
- Resting place: Oak Lawn Cemetery; Fairfield, Connecticut, U.S.
- Party: Republican
- Spouse: Helen M. McMurray Shannon
- Children: 3

James Coughlin Shannon (July 21, 1896 – March 6, 1980) was an American politician and the 77th governor of Connecticut.

== Biography ==
Shannon was born in Bridgeport, Connecticut on July 21, 1896. He was the son of Henry E. Shannon and Ellen Coughlin Shannon. He completed his bachelor's degree from Georgetown University in 1918, and completed his LL.B. degree from Yale Law School in 1921. He married Helen M. McMurray on April 15, 1925. The couple had two sons, John H., and James C. Jr.; as well as one daughter, Helen Clair Richards.

== Career ==
Shannon became Bridgeport's prosecuting attorney in 1923. He held that position for nine years. He was on the bench of the Bridgeport City and Juvenile Courts from 1931 to 1935. He was the attorney for the Connecticut Federation of Labor from 1939 to 1948. In 1948 he was a delegate to Republican National Convention from Connecticut. As a member of the US Navy Reserve, he served as an aviator in the U.S. Navy Air Force during World War I.

Shannon served as the 89th Lieutenant Governor of Connecticut from 1947 to 1948. James L. McConaughy, the Governor of Connecticut at the time, died on March 7, 1948. Shannon became the governor on the same day. During his term, legislation was constituted that raised old-age pension benefits. He was also successful in securing the appropriate legislation regarding housing reform measures. He was unsuccessful in his re-election bid in 1948, and left office on January 5, 1949.

After leaving office, Shannon was on the bench of the Connecticut Superior Court from 1953 to 1965. He was a member of Republican National Committee from Connecticut in 1952. He also was an associate justice of the Connecticut Supreme Court from 1965 to 1966.

== Death ==
Shannon died at a convalescent hospital in Fairfield on March 6, 1980. He is interred in Oak Lawn Cemetery in Fairfield, Connecticut.

Party political offices
Preceded by James L. McConaughy	Republican nominee for Governor of Connecticut; 1948	Succeeded by John Davis Lodge
Political offices
Preceded by Vacant	Lieutenant Governor of Connecticut; 1947–1948	Succeeded by Robert E. Parsons
Preceded by James L. McConaughy	Governor of Connecticut; 1948–1949	Succeeded by Chester Bowles
Preceded by William J. Shea	Justice of the Connecticut Supreme Court; 1965–1966	Succeeded by John R. Thim
