= James L. McConaughy =

American politician (1887–1948)

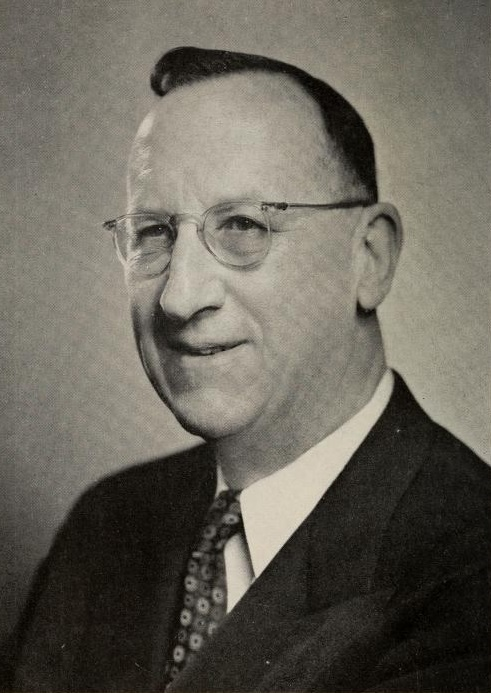
- From State of Connecticut Register and Manual 1947

76th Governor of Connecticut
- In office January 8, 1947 – March 7, 1948
- Lieutenant: James C. Shannon
- Preceded by: Wilbert Snow
- Succeeded by: James C. Shannon

85th Lieutenant Governor of Connecticut
- In office January 4, 1939 – January 8, 1941
- Governor: Raymond E. Baldwin
- Preceded by: T. Frank Hayes
- Succeeded by: Odell Shepard

Personal details
- Born: James Lukens McConaughy; October 21, 1887 New York City, US
- Died: March 7, 1948 (aged 60) Hartford, Connecticut, US
- Party: Republican
- Spouse: Elizabeth Townshend McConaughy
- Education: Yale University; Bowdoin College; Columbia University
- Profession: college professor; politician

James Lukens McConaughy (October 21, 1887 – March 7, 1948) was an American politician and the 76th governor of Connecticut.

== Biography ==
McConaughy was born in New York on October 21, 1887. At Yale University, McConaughy was a member of Beta Theta Pi fraternity and completed his bachelor's degree in 1909. While at Yale, McConaughy entered the inner circle of classmate Robert Moses, noted urban planner and one of the most influential figures in the history of New York City. He completed his master's degree from Bowdoin College in 1911. He then completed his Ph.D. from Columbia University in 1913. He also completed another master's degree from Dartmouth College in 1915. He taught English and education at Bowdoin College from 1909 to 1915. He married Elizabeth Townshend in 1913, and they had three children. He was a professor of education at Dartmouth College from 1918 to 1925. He also was President of Knox College and Wesleyan University from 1925 to 1943.

== Politics ==
McConaughy was a Republican. He was the 85th Lieutenant Governor of Connecticut from 1939 to 1941. The following year, he served as president of the United China Relief Fund, and was civilian deputy of the Office of Strategic Service, serving from 1943 to 1945. He was an alternate delegate to Republican National Convention from Connecticut in 1944.

McConaughy won the 1946 Republican gubernatorial nomination, and was elected Connecticut's 76th governor. During his term, legislation was constituted that subsidized local bonds for housing construction. Twenty million dollars were granted for school construction that benefited rural areas more than larger cities. The state's first sales tax was initiated; unemployment benefits and old-age annuities were enhanced. In addition, a Fair Employment Practices Commission was founded, and a state bonus was instituted for World War II veterans.

== Death ==
McConaughy died in Hartford, Connecticut, of coronary thrombosis on March 7, 1948, before finishing his term.

Party political offices
Preceded by Raymond E. Baldwin	Republican nominee for Governor of Connecticut; 1946	Succeeded by James C. Shannon
Political offices
Preceded by T. Frank Hayes	Lieutenant Governor of Connecticut; 1939–1941	Succeeded by Odell Shepard
Preceded by Charles W. Snow	Governor of Connecticut; 1947–1948	Succeeded by James C. Shannon
