= 1940 United States presidential election in Indiana =

- November 5, 1940
- Turnout: 81.1% ▲2.4 pp

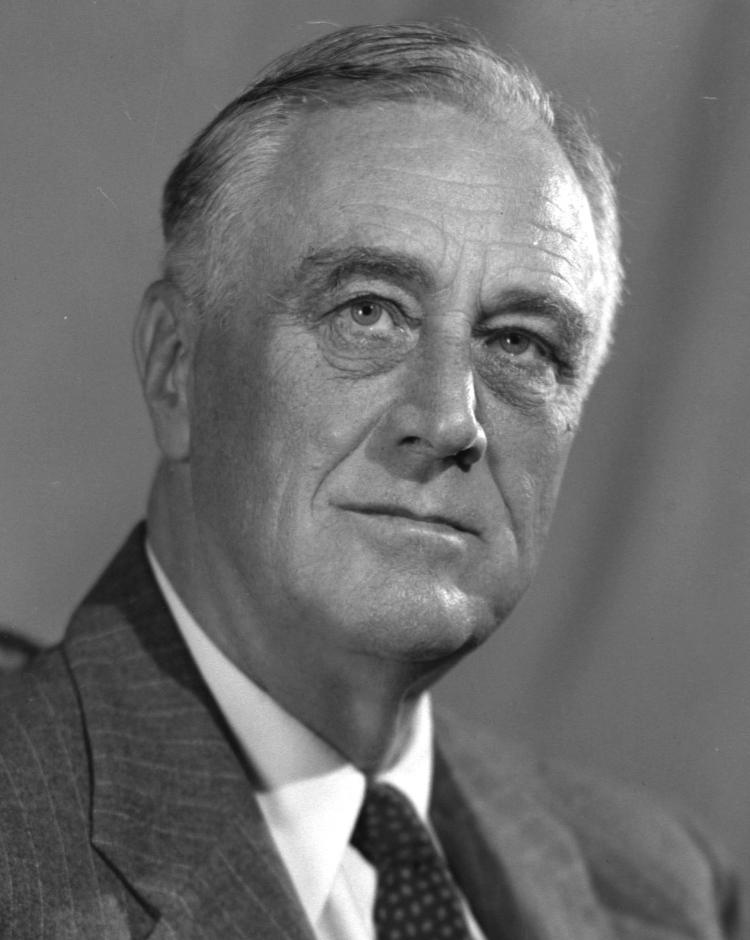
Nominee	Wendell Willkie	Franklin D. Roosevelt
Party	Republican	Democratic
Home state	New York	New York
Running mate	Charles L. McNary	Henry A. Wallace
Electoral vote	14	0
Popular vote	899,466	874,063
Percentage	50.45%	49.03%
County results
Willkie
40–50%
50–60%
60–70%
Roosevelt
40–50%
50–60%
60–70%
President before election
Franklin D. Roosevelt
Democratic
Elected President
Franklin D. Roosevelt
Democratic

A presidential election was held in Indiana on November 5, 1940, as part of the 1940 United States presidential election. The Republican ticket of the president of the Commonwealth & Southern Corporation Wendell Willkie and the senior U.S. senator from Oregon Charles L. McNary defeated the Democratic ticket of the incumbent president of the United States Franklin D. Roosevelt and the U.S. secretary of agriculture Henry A. Wallace. Roosevelt defeated Willkie in the national election with 449 electoral votes.

== General election ==
=== Results ===
1940 United States presidential election in Indiana
Party	Candidate	Votes	%	±%
Republican	Wendell Willkie Charles L. McNary	899,466	50.45	▲8.56
Democratic	Franklin D. Roosevelt Henry A. Wallace	874,063	49.03	▼7.60
Prohibition	Roger Babson Edgar V. Moorman	6,437	0.36	▲0.36
Socialist	Norman Thomas Maynard C. Krueger	2,075	0.12	▼0.11
Socialist Labor	John W. Aiken Aaron M. Orange	706	0.04	▲0.04
Total votes		1,782,747	100.00	

=== Results by county ===
1940 United States presidential election in Indiana by county
County	Wendell Willkie Republican		Franklin D. Roosevelt Democratic		Others		Margin		Total
County	Votes	%	Votes	%	Votes	%	Votes	%	Total
Adams	5,247	53.93%	4,382	45.04%	101	1.04%	865	8.89%	9,730
Allen	40,430	57.18%	29,967	42.38%	312	0.44%	10,463	14.80%	70,709
Bartholomew	7,890	48.84%	8,180	50.63%	86	0.53%	-290	-1.79%	16,156
Benton	3,675	57.57%	2,689	42.12%	20	0.31%	986	15.44%	6,384
Blackford	3,352	44.52%	4,095	54.38%	83	1.10%	-743	-9.87%	7,530
Boone	7,066	53.26%	6,152	46.37%	49	0.37%	914	6.89%	13,267
Brown	1,477	46.74%	1,662	52.59%	21	0.66%	-185	-5.85%	3,160
Carroll	5,012	54.05%	4,214	45.44%	47	0.51%	798	8.61%	9,273
Cass	10,057	49.33%	10,268	50.37%	61	0.30%	-211	-1.04%	20,386
Clark	6,044	40.02%	9,015	59.69%	45	0.30%	-2,971	-19.67%	15,104
Clay	7,768	51.40%	7,255	48.00%	91	0.60%	513	3.39%	15,114
Clinton	8,610	52.36%	7,732	47.02%	102	0.62%	878	5.34%	16,444
Crawford	2,652	47.97%	2,836	51.29%	41	0.74%	-184	-3.33%	5,529
Daviess	7,615	54.10%	6,401	45.48%	59	0.42%	1,214	8.63%	14,075
Dearborn	5,908	49.29%	6,038	50.37%	41	0.34%	-130	-1.08%	11,987
Decatur	6,087	57.71%	4,417	41.88%	43	0.41%	1,670	15.83%	10,547
DeKalb	7,676	57.17%	5,690	42.38%	60	0.45%	1,986	14.79%	13,426
Delaware	17,616	45.53%	20,836	53.85%	239	0.62%	-3,220	-8.32%	38,691
Dubois	4,729	44.01%	5,992	55.77%	24	0.22%	-1,263	-11.75%	10,745
Elkhart	19,735	58.53%	13,620	40.40%	361	1.07%	6,115	18.14%	33,716
Fayette	5,567	49.94%	5,542	49.72%	38	0.34%	25	0.22%	11,147
Floyd	8,056	42.53%	10,799	57.00%	89	0.47%	-2,743	-14.48%	18,944
Fountain	5,771	54.59%	4,783	45.24%	18	0.17%	988	9.35%	10,572
Franklin	4,381	58.11%	3,142	41.68%	16	0.21%	1,239	16.43%	7,539
Fulton	5,532	58.40%	3,879	40.95%	61	0.64%	1,653	17.45%	9,472
Gibson	8,326	48.34%	8,709	50.57%	188	1.09%	-383	-2.22%	17,223
Grant	15,187	52.77%	13,257	46.06%	335	1.16%	1,930	6.71%	28,779
Greene	9,071	50.71%	8,718	48.73%	100	0.56%	353	1.97%	17,889
Hamilton	8,931	64.73%	4,791	34.72%	75	0.54%	4,140	30.01%	13,797
Hancock	5,283	48.98%	5,417	50.23%	85	0.79%	-134	-1.24%	10,785
Harrison	4,650	49.26%	4,725	50.06%	64	0.68%	-75	-0.79%	9,439
Hendricks	6,782	57.92%	4,883	41.70%	45	0.38%	1,899	16.22%	11,710
Henry	11,051	52.98%	9,623	46.14%	184	0.88%	1,428	6.85%	20,858
Howard	11,855	47.82%	12,655	51.04%	283	1.14%	-800	-3.23%	24,793
Huntington	9,110	55.22%	7,220	43.77%	167	1.01%	1,890	11.46%	16,497
Jackson	6,281	45.13%	7,557	54.30%	79	0.57%	-1,276	-9.17%	13,917
Jasper	4,462	61.62%	2,751	37.99%	28	0.39%	1,711	23.63%	7,241
Jay	6,478	49.27%	6,554	49.84%	117	0.89%	-76	-0.58%	13,149
Jefferson	5,957	55.80%	4,688	43.91%	31	0.29%	1,269	11.89%	10,676
Jennings	3,921	56.51%	2,989	43.08%	29	0.42%	932	13.43%	6,939
Johnson	6,451	50.18%	6,350	49.39%	56	0.44%	101	0.79%	12,857
Knox	11,211	47.52%	12,265	51.99%	114	0.48%	-1,054	-4.47%	23,590
Kosciusko	9,879	62.68%	5,768	36.60%	113	0.72%	4,111	26.09%	15,760
LaGrange	3,731	63.43%	2,124	36.11%	27	0.46%	1,607	27.32%	5,882
Lake	45,898	38.79%	71,985	60.83%	447	0.38%	-26,087	-22.05%	118,330
LaPorte	15,771	53.29%	13,732	46.40%	90	0.30%	2,039	6.89%	29,593
Lawrence	10,717	61.92%	6,553	37.86%	38	0.22%	4,164	24.06%	17,308
Madison	22,382	45.91%	26,111	53.56%	261	0.54%	-3,729	-7.65%	48,754
Marion	124,845	50.43%	121,907	49.25%	787	0.32%	2,938	1.19%	247,539
Marshall	7,718	56.41%	5,852	42.77%	111	0.81%	1,866	13.64%	13,681
Martin	2,902	52.28%	2,638	47.52%	11	0.20%	264	4.76%	5,551
Miami	8,217	52.76%	7,252	46.56%	106	0.68%	965	6.20%	15,575
Monroe	10,311	55.74%	8,117	43.88%	71	0.38%	2,194	11.86%	18,499
Montgomery	8,554	54.78%	6,994	44.79%	68	0.44%	1,560	9.99%	15,616
Morgan	6,613	57.29%	4,895	42.40%	36	0.31%	1,718	14.88%	11,544
Newton	3,536	62.32%	2,116	37.29%	22	0.39%	1,420	25.03%	5,674
Noble	7,443	59.46%	5,014	40.06%	60	0.48%	2,429	19.41%	12,517
Ohio	1,186	49.33%	1,210	50.33%	8	0.33%	-24	-1.00%	2,404
Orange	5,519	57.77%	4,003	41.90%	31	0.32%	1,516	15.87%	9,553
Owen	3,709	54.00%	3,121	45.44%	38	0.55%	588	8.56%	6,868
Parke	5,242	54.14%	4,384	45.28%	57	0.59%	858	8.86%	9,683
Perry	4,489	50.00%	4,475	49.84%	14	0.16%	14	0.16%	8,978
Pike	4,672	50.91%	4,449	48.48%	56	0.61%	223	2.43%	9,177
Porter	8,270	58.40%	5,840	41.24%	51	0.36%	2,430	17.16%	14,161
Posey	4,514	47.06%	5,022	52.35%	57	0.59%	-508	-5.30%	9,593
Pulaski	3,472	52.70%	3,021	45.86%	95	1.44%	451	6.85%	6,588
Putnam	5,832	49.00%	6,020	50.58%	49	0.41%	-188	-1.58%	11,901
Randolph	8,033	57.19%	5,787	41.20%	226	1.61%	2,246	15.99%	14,046
Ripley	6,061	55.44%	4,834	44.21%	38	0.35%	1,227	11.22%	10,933
Rush	6,486	60.02%	4,282	39.62%	39	0.36%	2,204	20.39%	10,807
St. Joseph	36,164	44.02%	45,620	55.53%	374	0.46%	-9,456	-11.51%	82,158
Scott	2,285	45.96%	2,668	53.66%	19	0.38%	-383	-7.70%	4,972
Shelby	7,216	47.02%	8,015	52.22%	117	0.76%	-799	-5.21%	15,348
Spencer	5,667	57.31%	4,180	42.27%	42	0.42%	1,487	15.04%	9,889
Starke	3,473	54.16%	2,917	45.49%	22	0.34%	556	8.67%	6,412
Steuben	5,056	66.35%	2,524	33.12%	40	0.52%	2,532	33.23%	7,620
Sullivan	6,471	42.32%	8,667	56.69%	151	0.99%	-2,196	-14.36%	15,289
Switzerland	2,285	46.01%	2,659	53.54%	22	0.44%	-374	-7.53%	4,966
Tippecanoe	16,148	56.96%	12,129	42.78%	73	0.26%	4,019	14.18%	28,350
Tipton	4,749	52.90%	4,173	46.48%	56	0.62%	576	6.42%	8,978
Union	2,009	58.35%	1,415	41.10%	19	0.55%	594	17.25%	3,443
Vanderburgh	28,417	42.25%	38,567	57.33%	283	0.42%	-10,150	-15.09%	67,267
Vermillion	5,716	47.74%	6,174	51.57%	83	0.69%	-458	-3.83%	11,973
Vigo	23,177	43.99%	29,308	55.63%	199	0.38%	-6,131	-11.64%	52,684
Wabash	8,755	61.11%	5,431	37.91%	141	0.98%	3,324	23.20%	14,327
Warren	2,999	60.71%	1,927	39.01%	14	0.28%	1,072	21.70%	4,940
Warrick	5,456	51.88%	5,019	47.72%	42	0.40%	437	4.16%	10,517
Washington	4,216	48.37%	4,471	51.30%	29	0.33%	-255	-2.93%	8,716
Wayne	15,058	51.27%	14,139	48.14%	173	0.59%	919	3.13%	29,370
Wells	4,898	47.75%	5,236	51.05%	123	1.20%	-338	-3.30%	10,257
White	5,189	55.15%	4,176	44.38%	44	0.47%	1,013	10.77%	9,409
Whitley	5,100	53.34%	4,404	46.06%	57	0.60%	696	7.28%	9,561
TOTAL	899,466	50.45%	874,063	49.03%	9,218	0.52%	25,403	1.42%	1,782,747

==== Counties that flipped from Democratic to Republican ====
- Adams
- Allen
- Boone
- Benton
- Carroll
- Clay
- Clinton
- Daviess
- DeKalb
- Fayette
- Fountain
- Franklin
- Grant
- Greene
- Henry
- Huntington
- Johnson
- LaPorte
- Lawrence
- Marshall
- Martin
- Marion
- Miami
- Montgomery
- Monroe
- Noble
- Owen
- Parke
- Perry
- Pike
- Pulaski
- Rush
- Ripley
- Union
- Tipton
- Spencer
- Starke
- Warrick
- Wayne
- White
- Whitley

== See also ==
- United States presidential elections in Indiana

== Bibliography ==
- Indiana (1941). Year Book of the State of Indiana for the Year 1940. Indianapolis: Division of Accounting and Statistics.
- Madison, James H. (1986). The Indiana Way: A State History. Bloomington: Indiana University Press.
- Petersen, Svend (1963). A Statistical History of the American Presidential Elections. New York: Frederick Ungar Publishing Company. LCCN 62-21786.
