= 1942 Connecticut gubernatorial election =

- November 3, 1942
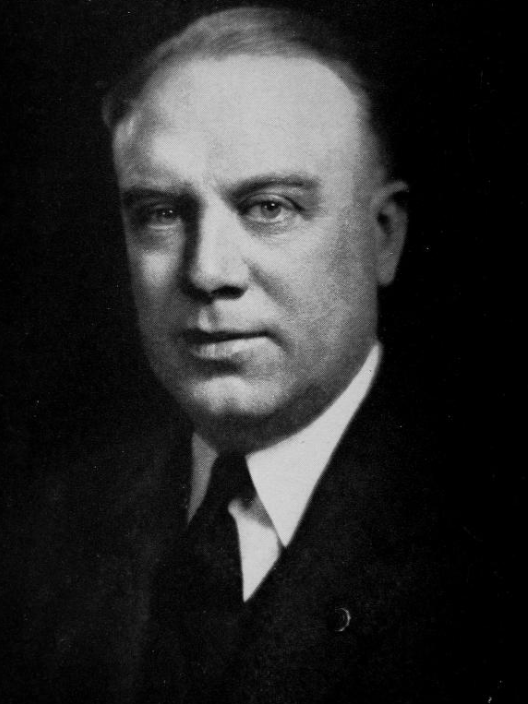

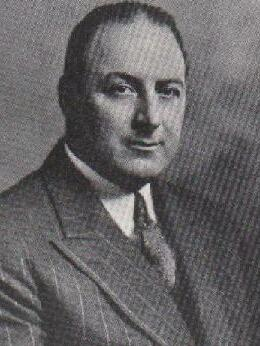

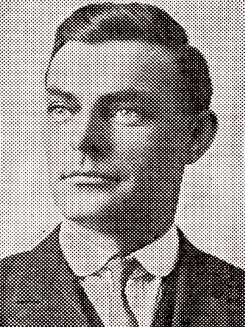
Nominee	Raymond E. Baldwin	Robert A. Hurley	Jasper McLevy
Party	Republican	Democratic	Socialist
Popular vote	281,362	255,166	34,537
Percentage	48.93%	44.38%	6.01%
- Baldwin: 40–50% 50–60% 60–70% 70–80% 80–90% Hurley: 40–50% 50–60% 60–70%
Governor before election
Robert A. Hurley
Democratic
Elected Governor
Raymond E. Baldwin
Republican

The 1942 Connecticut gubernatorial election was held on November 3, 1942. It was a rematch of the 1940 Connecticut gubernatorial election. The Republican party nominee, Raymond E. Baldwin, defeated the Democratic party incumbent, Robert A. Hurley, with 48.93% of the vote.

== General election ==
=== Candidates ===
Major party candidates

- Raymond E. Baldwin, Republican
- Robert A. Hurley, Democratic

Other candidates

- Jasper McLevy, Socialist
- Joseph C. Borden Jr., Socialist Labor

=== Results ===
1942 Connecticut gubernatorial election
Party	Candidate	Votes	%
Republican	Raymond E. Baldwin	281,362	48.93%
Democratic	Robert A. Hurley (incumbent)	255,166	44.38%
Socialist	Jasper McLevy	34,537	6.01%
Socialist Labor	Joseph C. Borden Jr.	3,936	0.69%
Total votes		575,001	100.00%
Republican gain from Democratic			
