= Governor Hurley =

Governor Hurley may refer to:

- Charles F. Hurley (1893–1946), 54th Governor of Massachusetts
- Robert A. Hurley (1895–1968), 73rd Governor of Connecticut
