= Arthur F. Ells =

American judge (1879–1963)

Arthur Fairbanks Ells (December 17, 1879 – December 8, 1963) was a justice of the Connecticut Supreme Court from 1940 to 1949. He also served in the Connecticut State Senate in the 1920's as a Republican, representing Waterbury, Connecticut.

Born in Norwalk, Connecticut to George Nelson and Lucy Ann Fairbanks Ells, he graduated from Amherst College and Harvard Law School and died in Litchfield, Connecticut.

On April 27, 1939, Governor Raymond E. Baldwin nominated Ells to a seat on the state Supreme Court set to be vacated in May 1940 by the mandatory retirement of Justice George E. Hinman, a position he served until 1949.

Political offices
Preceded by George E. Hinman	Justice of the Connecticut Supreme Court; 1940–1949	Succeeded by Raymond E. Baldwin
