= Helen Lewis (politician) =

American politician (died 1938)

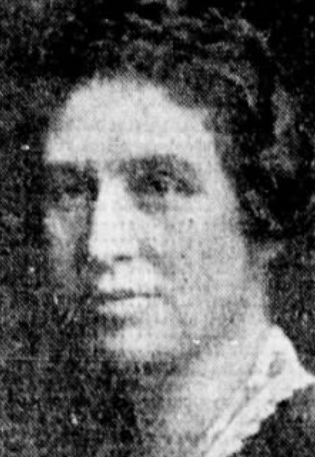

Member of the Connecticut House of Representatives from Stratford
- In office 1923–1933
- Preceded by: George A. Fairchild; Frederick Beardsley
- Succeeded by: Raymond E. Baldwin; Theresa Holmgren

Personal details
- Born: 1886 or 1887 South Dakota, U.S.
- Died: September 21, 1938 (aged 51)
- Party: Republican
- Spouse: Henry LeRoy Lewis (m. 1910)
- Children: 3
- Education: Vassar College

Helen E. Lewis (1886 or 1887 – September 21, 1938) was an American politician who served in the Connecticut House of Representatives from 1923 to 1933, representing the town of Stratford as a Republican. She became the first Republican woman to be nominated for a major office in Connecticut on September 16, 1938, when she was nominated for secretary of the state of Connecticut.

== Personal life ==
Lewis was born in South Dakota. In 1908, she graduated from Vassar College in Poughkeepsie, New York. In 1910, she married Henry LeRoy Lewis, an oyster grower who owned oyster companies in Connecticut, Rhode Island, and New York. Together, they had three children; Cait, Mary, and Hervey.

Lewis was a member of the American Association of University Women.

== Political career ==
=== Connecticut House of Representatives ===
A Republican, Lewis was elected to the Connecticut House of Representatives in 1922, and she served five terms as one of two representatives from the town of Stratford. In April 1930, Lewis commented that she would not run for reelection to the 1931 session, but she ultimately ran and was elected to a fifth term that November. She did not run for reelection in 1932 and was succeeded by fellow Republicans Raymond E. Baldwin and Theresa Holmgren.

During her tenure in the House, Lewis served on the Education Committee, including two terms as chairman. She was also a member of the Connecticut State Board of Education.

=== 1938 Secretary of State election ===
On September 16, 1938, Lewis was chosen as the Republican nominee for secretary of the state of Connecticut, becoming the first woman nominated to a major office by the Connecticut Republican Party. Lewis died five days later, and Sara Crawford was chosen as a replacement nominee on October 11. Upon receiving the nomination, Crawford commented that she thought Lewis would have approved. She stated that she and Lewis had "fought shoulder to shoulder in many a battle in the past" and that she felt they were "fighting shoulder to shoulder now." Crawford was elected, becoming the first woman to serve as Connecticut's secretary of state in 1939.

== Death ==
Lewis and her husband, Henry, drowned during the 1938 New England hurricane. On September 21, 1938, their cottage on Reel Island, a part of the Thimble Islands archipelago, was swept into Long Island Sound while they and their daughter Cait were inside. Cait was rescued from the water and survived, but Henry and Helen were considered missing until their bodies were recovered near Stony Creek; Henry's on September 22 and Helen's on September 24, both in the wreckage of their cottage. Helen was 51, and Henry was 53. They were buried in Walnut Grove Cemetery in Meriden, Connecticut.
