= 1946 United States Senate elections in Connecticut =

1946 United States Senate election in Connecticut
- November 5, 1946
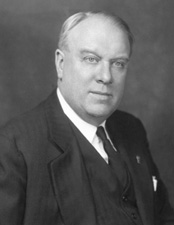

Nominee	Raymond E. Baldwin	Joseph M. Tone
Party	Republican	Democratic
Popular vote	381,328	276,424
Percentage	55.84%	40.48%
- Baldwin: 50–60% 60–70% 70–80% 80–90% >90% Tone: 50–60% 60–70%
U.S. senator before election
Thomas C. Hart
Republican
Elected U.S. Senator
Raymond E. Baldwin
Republican

Two United States Senate elections in Connecticut were held on November 5, 1946, to determine the next United States senator from Connecticut. One election determined who would complete the remainder of deceased Senator Francis T. Maloney's term and the other was for the regularly scheduled term from 1947 to 1953.

Republican governor of Connecticut Raymond E. Baldwin won both elections. In the special election, he defeated former governor Wilbur Cross. In the regularly scheduled election, Baldwin defeated Democratic Assistant Secretary of Labor Joseph Tone.

== Background ==
Senator Maloney died on January 16, 1945. Former Admiral Thomas C. Hart was appointed to serve in his place as Senator until a duly elected successor could be named.

== Special election ==
=== Candidates ===
- Raymond Baldwin, Governor of Connecticut (Republican)
- Frederic C. Smedley (Socialist)
- Wilbur L. Cross, former governor of Connecticut (Democratic)

=== Results ===
1946 U.S. Senate special election in Connecticut
Party	Candidate	Votes	%
Republican	Raymond E. Baldwin	378,707	55.77%
Democratic	Wilbur L. Cross	278,188	40.97%
Socialist	Frederick C. Smedley	22,164	3.26%
Total votes		679,059	100.00%

== General election ==
=== Candidates ===
- John W. Aiken (Socialist Labor)
- Raymond Baldwin, Governor of Connecticut (Republican)
- Frederic C. Smedley (Socialist)
- Joseph Tone, former Assistant Secretary of Labor (Democratic)

=== Results ===
1946 U.S. Senate election in Connecticut
Party	Candidate	Votes	%
Republican	Raymond E. Baldwin	381,328	55.84%
Democratic	Joseph M. Tone	276,424	40.48%
Socialist	Frederick C. Smedley	22,012	3.22%
Socialist Labor	John W. Aiken	3.156	0.46%
Total votes		682,920	100.00%

== Aftermath ==
Senator Hart resigned his seat that day, and Baldwin assumed the seat on December 27. Baldwin himself resigned in December 1949 to join the Connecticut Supreme Court of Errors.
