= Wendell Lewis Willkie House =

Historic house in Indiana, United States

- U.S. National Register of Historic Places
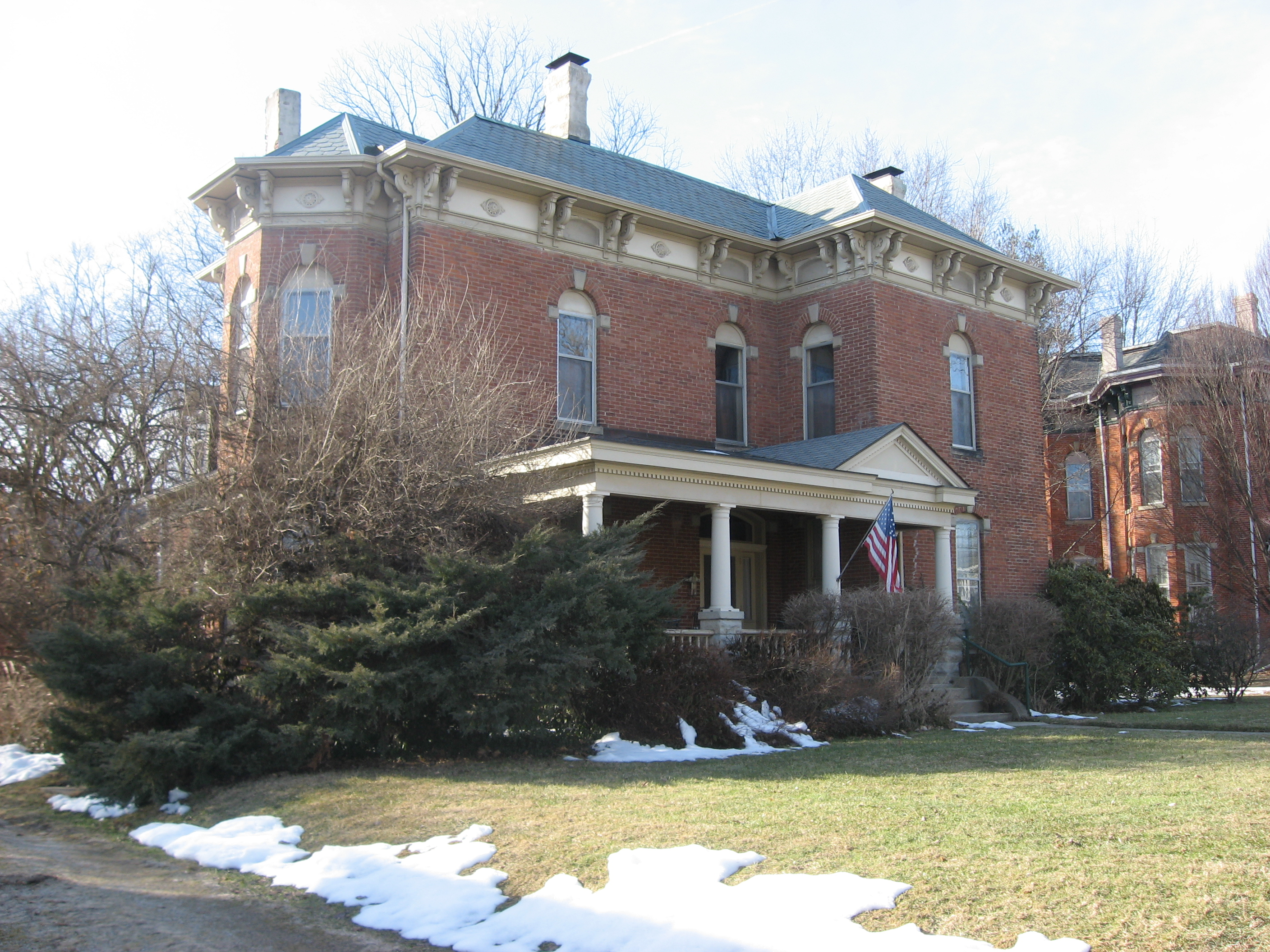
- Wendell Lewis Willkie House, March 2010

- Location within Indiana Location within the United States
- Location: 601 N. Harrison St., Rushville, Indiana
- Coordinates: 39°36′46″N 85°26′53″W
- Area: less than one acre
- Built: c. 1874
- Architectural style: Italianate
- NRHP reference No.: 93001415
- Added to NRHP: December 27, 1993

Wendell Lewis Willkie House, also known as the Cullen-Mauzy-Willkie House, is a historic home located in Rushville, Indiana, that was the home of dark horse Republican presidential candidate Wendell Willkie from 1940 to 1944.

Built about 1874, it is a 2 1/2-story, "L"-plan, Italianate brick dwelling, with a slate hipped roof, and sitting on a limestone foundation. It features segmental arched openings, paired scroll brackets, decorative rosettes, projecting bay, and a replacement porch built about 1900.

The house was listed in the National Register of Historic Places in 1993.
