= Raymond E. Baldwin =

American politician (1893–1986)

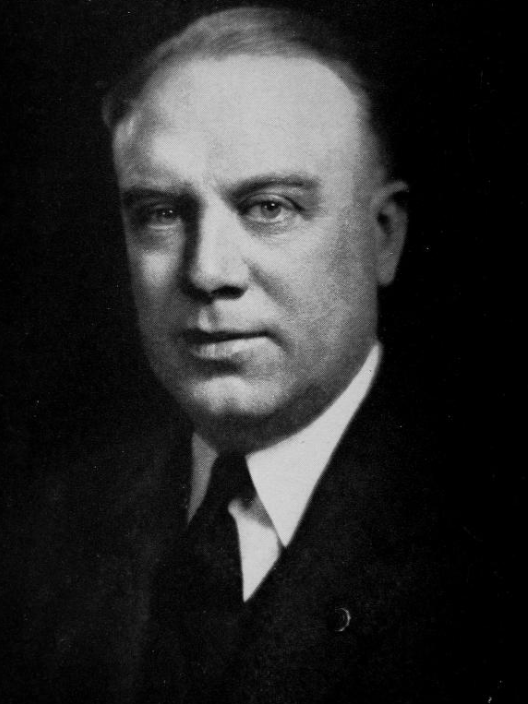

Associate Justice of the Connecticut Supreme Court of Errors
- In office 1949–1959

United States Senator from Connecticut
- In office December 27, 1946 – December 16, 1949
- Preceded by: Thomas C. Hart
- Succeeded by: William Benton

72nd & 74th Governor of Connecticut
- In office January 6, 1943 – December 27, 1946
- Lieutenant: William L. Hadden; Wilbert Snow
- Preceded by: Robert A. Hurley
- Succeeded by: Wilbert Snow
- In office January 4, 1939 – January 8, 1941
- Lieutenant: James L. McConaughy
- Preceded by: Wilbur Lucius Cross
- Succeeded by: Robert A. Hurley

Majority Leader of the Connecticut House of Representatives
- In office 1933

Member of the Connecticut House of Representatives from Stratford
- In office 1931–1935
- Preceded by: Helen Lewis; R. B. DeLacour
- Succeeded by: Raymond Watt; Theresa Holmgren

Personal details
- Born: Raymond Earl Baldwin; August 31, 1893 Rye, New York, U.S.
- Died: October 4, 1986 (aged 93) Fairfield, Connecticut, U.S.
- Party: Republican
- Spouse: Edith Lindholm (m. 1922; died 1970)
- Children: 3
- Education: Wesleyan University; Yale Law School (LL.B.)
- Profession: lawyer, politician, judge

Military service
- Branch/service: United States Navy
- Years of service: 1918–1919
- Rank: Lieutenant (junior grade)
- Battles/wars: World War I

Raymond Earl Baldwin (August 31, 1893 – October 4, 1986) was an American politician who served as a United States senator from Connecticut and also as the 72nd and 74th governor of Connecticut. A conservative Republican, he was elected governor of Connecticut in 1938 during a Republican landslide promising a balanced budget, government aid to private business, and lower taxes. He sharply cut the state budget, producing a million dollars surplus. He was defeated for reelection in 1940, but was elected governor again in 1942 and 1944. He supervised a complex system of civil defense and statewide services on the homefront during the war. He planned an elaborate program to deal with the postwar reconversion of Connecticut's many warplane and munitions plants. He was elected to the Senate in the Republican landslide of 1946. As a spokesman for the small businesses of America, he compiled a conservative record in favor of less regulation, except for more regulation of labor unions through the Taft–Hartley Act. As chairman of a subcommittee of the Armed Services committee, Baldwin engaged in a long-running dispute with Wisconsin Senator Joseph McCarthy. McCarthy alleged that Baldwin was whitewashing an episode in which Army prosecutors in 1944 gained the death penalty for German soldiers accused of massacring Americans at the Malmedy Massacre. Exhausted by the highly publicized controversy, Baldwin resigned from the Senate in December 1949 to become a state judge.

== Early life ==
Baldwin was born in 1893 in Rye, New York, the son of Sarah Emily (Tyler) and Lucian Earl Baldwin. He moved to Middletown, Connecticut, and attended public schools. He graduated from Wesleyan University in Middletown in 1916, and entered Yale University. However, upon the declaration of war, he enlisted in the United States Navy. He was assigned to officers' training school and was commissioned an ensign in February 1918, and promoted to lieutenant (j.g.) in September 1918. He resigned from the Navy in August 1919 and returned to Yale Law School, graduating in 1921. He was admitted to the bar in 1921 and practiced in New Haven and Bridgeport. He married Edith Lindholm on June 29, 1922, and they had three sons.

== Career ==
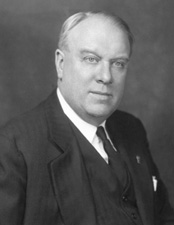
Senate portrait

Baldwin was prosecutor of the Stratford Town Court from 1927 to 1930, and was judge of that court from 1931 to 1933. He was a member of the Connecticut House of Representatives for two terms from 1931 to 1935, representing Stratford as a Republican. He served his first term alongside Helen Lewis, and his second alongside Theresa Holmgren. He served as majority leader in 1933. He resumed the practice of law from 1933 to 1938, and was town chairman of Stratford from 1935 to 1937.

Baldwin was Governor of Connecticut in 1939 and 1940, and the first governor to use the Governor's Mansion located on Prospect Avenue in Hartford. He was an unsuccessful candidate for reelection to the office in 1940. An early supporter of Wendell Willkie, he saw to it that the Connecticut delegation at the 1940 Republican Convention, would back Willkie which was crucial to beat frontrunners Thomas Dewey, Robert A. Taft, and Arthur Vandenberg. Willkie had unofficially promised Baldwin the spot as his running mate, but party leaders pressured Willkie to name Charles McNary instead, and Baldwin graciously stepped aside from contention. He was also a delegate in 1944 and 1948.

Again elected Governor in 1942 and 1944, Baldwin served until his resignation on December 27, 1946. During his tenure, he eliminated the state deficit without raising taxes; initiated a job-training program; created an inter-racial commission, and reformed the minor court system. Also instituted were a Connecticut Veterans Advisory and Reemployment Commission; and a labor management council. He was elected United States Senator as a Republican on November 5, 1946, to fill the vacancy in the term ending January 3, 1947, caused by the death of Francis T. Maloney. At the same time he was elected for the term commencing January 3, 1947, and served from December 27, 1946, until his resignation on December 16, 1949.

In 1949, Baldwin succeeded Arthur F. Ells, his own appointee, as an associate justice of the Connecticut Supreme Court of Errors (now the Supreme Court of Connecticut); he was appointed chief justice in 1959 and served until his retirement in 1963. In 1964, Baldwin was recipient of the Yale Club of Hartford's Nathan Hale Award in recognition of outstanding service to Yale and Connecticut. He was chairman of the Connecticut Constitutional Convention in 1965.

== Death ==
Baldwin died in Fairfield, Connecticut, on October 4, 1986, and is interred at Indian Hill Cemetery, Middletown, Connecticut.

A member of the Connecticut State Library Committee and its successor, the State Library Board, from 1957 to 1982; Baldwin served as its chair for many years. In tribute to his service, the board renamed the State Library's museum the Raymond E. Baldwin Museum of Connecticut History in 1983. The Raymond E. Baldwin Bridge that carries the Connecticut Turnpike (I-95) across the Connecticut River is also named for him. The Middlesex Judicial District courthouse in Middletown, as well as the Baldwin Center, a senior citizens center in Stratford, are named in his honor.

Political offices
Preceded by Wilbur Lucius Cross	Governor of Connecticut; 1939–1941	Succeeded by Robert A. Hurley
Preceded by Robert A. Hurley	Governor of Connecticut; 1943–1946	Succeeded by Wilbert Snow
U.S. Senate
Preceded by Thomas Hart	U.S. senator (Class 1) from Connecticut; December 27, 1946 – December 16, 1949; Served alongside: Brien McMahon	Succeeded by William Benton
Party political offices
Preceded by Arthur M. Brown	Republican nominee for Governor of Connecticut; 1938, 1940, 1942, 1944	Succeeded by James L. McConaughy
Preceded by Paul L. Cornell	Republican nominee for United States Senator from Connecticut (Class 1); 1946	Succeeded by Prescott Bush
