= 1944 Connecticut gubernatorial election =

- November 7, 1944
- Turnout: 86.83%
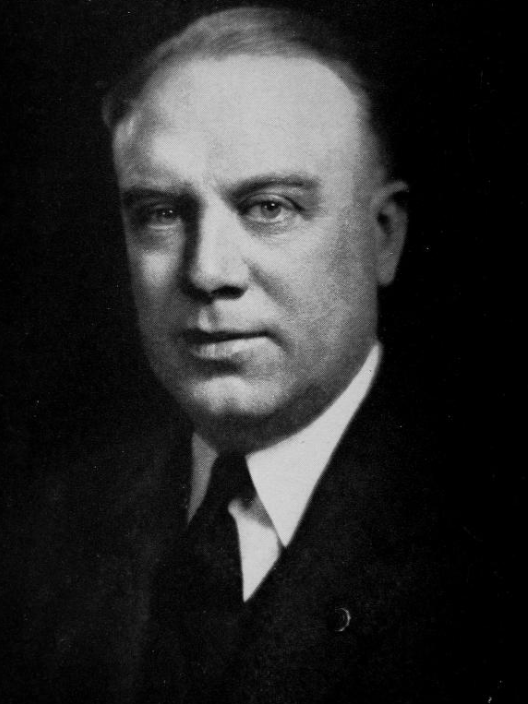

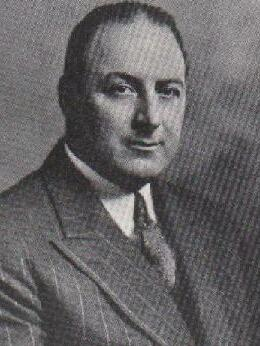
Nominee	Raymond E. Baldwin	Robert A. Hurley
Party	Republican	Democratic
Popular vote	418,289	392,417
Percentage	50.48%	47.36%
- Baldwin: 40–50% 50–60% 60–70% 70–80% 80–90% Hurley: 40–50% 50–60% 60–70%
Governor before election
Raymond E. Baldwin
Republican
Elected Governor
Raymond E. Baldwin
Republican

The 1944 Connecticut gubernatorial election was held on November 7, 1944. It was the third consecutive gubernatorial race between the same two nominees. Incumbent Republican Raymond E. Baldwin defeated Democratic nominee Robert A. Hurley with 50.48% of the vote.

== General election ==
=== Candidates ===
Major party candidates

- Raymond E. Baldwin, Republican
- Robert A. Hurley, Democratic

Other candidates

- Jasper McLevy, Socialist
- Joseph C. Borden Jr., Socialist Labor

=== Results ===
1944 Connecticut gubernatorial election
Party	Candidate	Votes	%
Republican	Raymond E. Baldwin (incumbent)	418,289	50.48%
Democratic	Robert A. Hurley	392,417	47.36%
Socialist	Jasper McLevy	16,475	1.99%
Socialist Labor	Joseph C. Borden Jr.	1,398	0.17%
Total votes		828,579	100.00%
Republican hold			
