= Theresa Holmgren =

American politician (died 1982)

Member of the Connecticut House of Representatives from Stratford
- In office 1933–1939 Serving with Raymond E. Baldwin (1933–1935); Raymond Watt (1935–1939)
- Preceded by: Raymond E. Baldwin; Helen Lewis
- Succeeded by: Florence Abercrombie; Edward S. Birge

Personal details
- Born: 1886 or 1887 New Haven, Connecticut, U.S.
- Died: June 2, 1982 (aged 95) Florida, U.S.
- Party: Republican

Theresa M. Holmgren (1886 or 1887 – June 2, 1982) was an American politician who served in the Connecticut House of Representatives from 1933 to 1939, representing the town of Stratford as a Republican.
