= 1940 Connecticut gubernatorial election =

- November 5, 1940
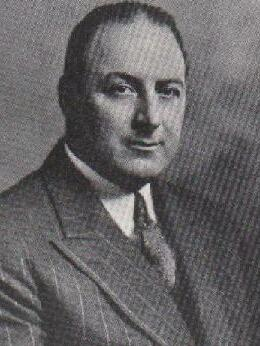

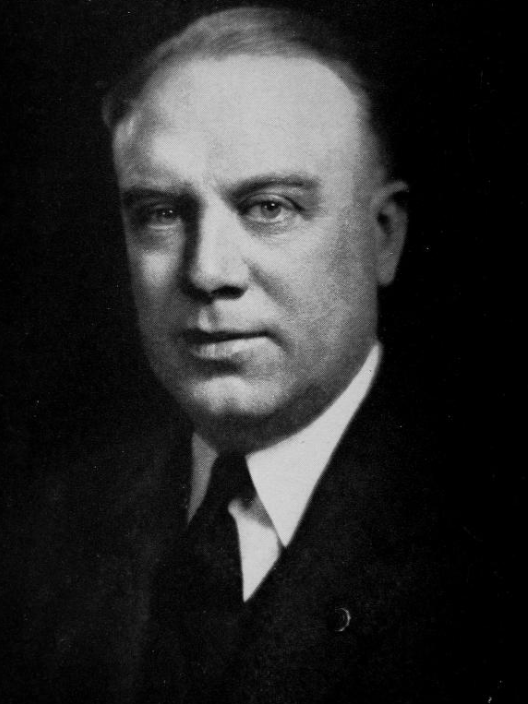
| Nominee | Robert A. Hurley | Raymond E. Baldwin |
| Party | Democratic | Republican |
| Popular vote | 388,361 | 374,581 |
| Percentage | 49.54% | 47.78% |
- Hurley: 40–50% 50–60% 60–70% 70–80% Baldwin: 40–50% 50–60% 60–70% 70–80% 80–90%
Governor before election
Raymond E. Baldwin
Republican
Elected Governor
Robert A. Hurley
Democratic

The 1940 Connecticut gubernatorial election was held on November 5, 1940. Democratic nominee Robert A. Hurley defeated incumbent Republican Raymond E. Baldwin with 49.54% of the vote.

== General election ==
=== Candidates ===
Major party candidates

- Robert A. Hurley, Democratic
- Raymond E. Baldwin, Republican

Other candidates

- Jasper McLevy, Socialist
- Joseph Mackay, Socialist Labor
- Michael A. Russo, Communist

=== Results ===
1940 Connecticut gubernatorial election
| Party | Candidate | Votes | % | ±% |
|---|---|---|---|---|
| Democratic | Robert A. Hurley | 388,361 | 49.54% | |
| Republican | Raymond E. Baldwin (incumbent) | 374,581 | 47.78% | |
| Socialist | Jasper McLevy | 18,090 | 2.31% | |
| Socialist Labor | Joseph Mackay | 1,815 | 0.23% | |
| Communist | Michael A. Russo | 1,141 | 0.15% | |
| Majority | | 13,780 | | |
| Turnout | | | | |
| Democratic gain from Republican | | Swing | | |
