= Wendell Willkie =

American lawyer and corporate executive (1892–1944)

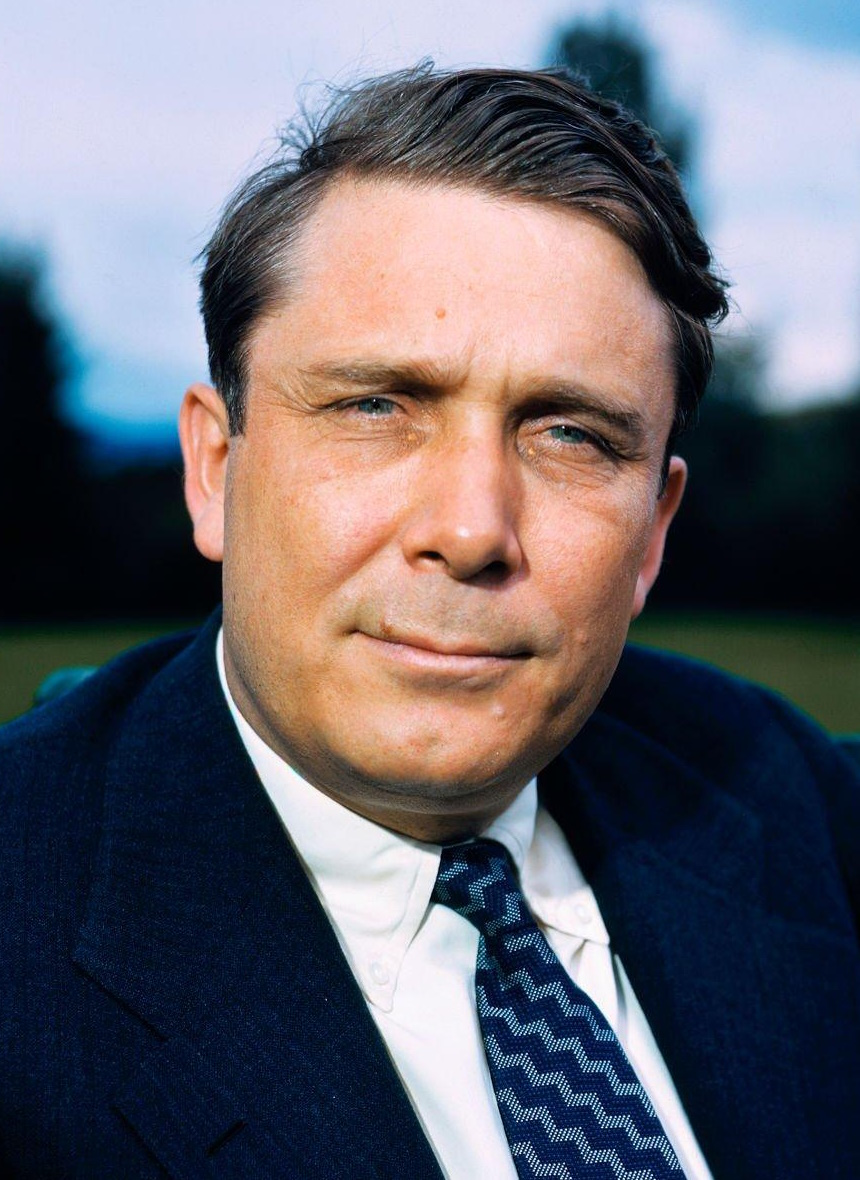
- Willkie in 1940
- Born: Lewis Wendell Willkie; February 18, 1892; Elwood, Indiana, U.S.
- Died: October 8, 1944 (aged 52); New York City, U.S.
- Burial place: East Hill Cemetery
- Education: Indiana University, Bloomington (BA, LLB)
- Political party: Democratic (until 1939); Republican (from 1939)
- Spouse: Edith Wilk (m. 1918)
- Children: Philip Willkie

Wendell Lewis Willkie (born Lewis Wendell Willkie; February 18, 1892 – October 8, 1944) was an American lawyer, corporate executive and the 1940 Republican nominee for president of the United States. Willkie appealed to many convention delegates as the Republican field's only interventionist: although the U.S. remained neutral prior to Pearl Harbor, he favored greater U.S. involvement in World War II to support Britain and other Allies. His Democratic opponent, incumbent President Franklin D. Roosevelt, who had made campaign pledges against U.S. involvement in World War II, won the 1940 election with about 55% of the popular vote and took the electoral college vote by a wide margin.

Willkie was born in Elwood, Indiana, in 1892; both his parents were lawyers, and he also became one. He served in World War I but was not sent to France until the final days of the war, and saw no action. Willkie settled in Akron, Ohio, where he was initially employed by Firestone, but left for a law firm, becoming one of the leaders of the Akron Bar Association. Much of his work was representing electric utilities, and in 1929 Willkie accepted a job in New York City as counsel for Commonwealth & Southern Corporation (C&S), a utility holding company. He was rapidly promoted, and became corporate president in 1933. Roosevelt was sworn in as U.S. president soon after Willkie became head of C&S, and announced plans for a Tennessee Valley Authority (TVA) that would supply power in competition with C&S. Between 1933 and 1939, Willkie fought against the TVA before Congress, in the courts, and before the public. He was ultimately unsuccessful, but sold C&S's property for a good price, and gained public esteem.

A longtime Democratic activist, Willkie changed his party registration to Republican in late 1939. He did not run in the 1940 presidential primaries, but positioned himself as an acceptable choice for a deadlocked convention. He sought backing from uncommitted delegates, while his supporters—many youthful—enthusiastically promoted his candidacy. As German forces advanced through western Europe in 1940, many Republicans did not wish to nominate an isolationist like Robert A. Taft, or a non-interventionist like Thomas E. Dewey, and turned to Willkie, who was nominated on the sixth ballot. Willkie's support for aid to Britain removed it as a major factor in his race against Roosevelt, and Willkie also backed the president on a peacetime draft. Both men took more isolationist positions towards the end of the race. Roosevelt won an unprecedented third term, taking 38 of the 48 states.

After the election, Willkie made two wartime foreign trips as Roosevelt's informal envoy, and as nominal leader of the Republican Party gave the president his full support. This angered many conservatives, especially as Willkie increasingly advocated liberal or internationalist causes. Willkie ran for the Republican nomination in 1944, but bowed out after a disastrous showing in the Wisconsin primary in April. He and Roosevelt discussed the possibility of forming a liberal political party after the war, but Willkie unexpectedly died in October 1944 at the age of 52 before the idea was finalised. Willkie is remembered for giving Roosevelt vital political assistance in 1941, which helped the president to pass Lend-Lease to send supplies to the United Kingdom and other Allied nations.

== Youth, education and World War I service ==
Lewis Wendell Willkie was born in Elwood, Indiana, on February 18, 1892, to Henrietta (Trisch) and Herman Francis Willkie. Both of his parents were lawyers, his mother being one of the first women admitted to the Indiana bar. Willkie was the fourth of six children, all intelligent, and learned skills during the nightly debates around the dinner table that would later serve him well.

Although given the first name Lewis, Willkie was known from childhood by his middle name. Herman Willkie, who had come from Prussia with his parents at age four, was intensely involved in progressive politics, and in 1896 took his sons to a torchlight procession for Democratic presidential candidate William Jennings Bryan, who had come to Elwood during his campaign. The Willkie boys had a sidewalk fight with Republican youths, and though the Willkies won their battle, Bryan lost his to William McKinley. When Bryan ran again in 1900, he stayed overnight at the Willkie home, and the Democratic candidate for president became the first political hero for the boy who would later seek that office.

By the time Willkie reached age 14 and enrolled in Elwood High School, his parents were concerned about a lack of discipline and a slight stoop, and they sent him to Culver Military Academy for a summer in an attempt to correct both. Willkie began to shine as a student in high school, inspired by his English teacher; one classmate said that Philip "Pat" Bing "fixed that boy up. He started preaching to Wendell to get to work and that kid went to town." Faced with a set of athletic brothers—Edward became an Olympic wrestler—Willkie joined the football team but had little success; he enjoyed the debate team more, but was several times disciplined for arguing with teachers. He was class president his final year, and president of the most prominent fraternity, but resigned from the latter when a sorority blackballed his girlfriend, Gwyneth Harry, as the daughter of immigrants.

During Willkie's summer vacations from high school, he worked, often far from home. In 1909, aged 17, his journey took him from Aberdeen, South Dakota, where he rose from dishwasher to co-owner of a flophouse, to Yellowstone National Park, where he was fired after losing control of the horses drawing a tourist stagecoach. Back in Elwood, Herman Willkie was representing striking workers at the local tin plate factory, and in August journeyed with Wendell to Chicago in an attempt to get liberal attorney Clarence Darrow to take over the representation. They found Darrow willing, but at too high a price for the union to meet; Darrow told Wendell Willkie, "there is nothing unethical in being adequately compensated for advocating a cause in which you deeply believe."

After graduation from Elwood High in January 1910, Willkie enrolled at Indiana University in Bloomington. There, he became a student rebel, chewing tobacco, reading Marx, and petitioning the faculty to add a course on socialism to the curriculum. He also involved himself in campus politics, successfully managing the campaign of future Indiana governor Paul McNutt for student office, but when Willkie ran himself, he was defeated. He graduated in June 1913, and to earn money for law school, taught high school history in Coffeyville, Kansas, coaching debaters and several sports teams. In November 1914, he left his job there for one as a lab assistant in Puerto Rico arranged by his brother Fred. Wendell Willkie's commitment to social justice was deepened by the sight of workers suffering abuse there.

Willkie enrolled at Indiana University School of Law in late 1915. He was a top student, and graduated with high honors in 1916. At the commencement ceremony, with the state supreme court present, he gave a provocative speech criticizing his school. The faculty withheld his degree, but granted it after two days of intense debate. Willkie joined his parents' law firm, but volunteered for the United States Army on April 2, 1917, the day President Woodrow Wilson asked Congress for a declaration of war against Germany. An army clerk transposed his first two names; with Willkie unwilling to invest the time to have the bureaucracy correct it, he kept his name as Wendell Lewis Willkie. Commissioned as a first lieutenant, Willkie was sent for artillery training. He arrived in France as the war was ending and did not see combat. In January 1918 he married Edith Wilk, a librarian from Rushville, Indiana; the couple had one son, Philip. In France, Willkie was assigned to defending soldiers who had slipped away for time in Paris against orders. He was recommended for promotion to captain, but was discharged in early 1919 before the paperwork went through.

== Lawyer and executive (1919–1939) ==
=== Akron attorney and activist ===
Discharged from the army, Willkie returned to Elwood. He considered a run for Congress as a Democrat, but was advised that the district was so Republican he would be unlikely to keep the seat even if he could win it, and his chances might be better in a more urban area. Herman Willkie wanted Wendell and Robert to rejoin the family law firm, but Henrietta was opposed, feeling that opportunities in Elwood were too limited for her sons. She got her way, and in May 1919 Wendell Willkie successfully applied for a job with the Firestone Tire and Rubber Company in Akron, Ohio as head of the legal office that advised workers on wills and other personal matters. He was soon bored there, and on the advice of his wife, left for a law firm despite an offer from Harvey Firestone to double his salary. Firestone told the departing lawyer that he would never amount to anything because he was a Democrat.

Willkie became active in the Akron Democratic Party, becoming prominent enough while still with Firestone to introduce the Democratic presidential nominee, Ohio Governor James M. Cox, when he came to town during the 1920 campaign. He was a delegate to the 1924 Democratic National Convention, and supported New York Governor Al Smith through the record 103 ballots, when the nomination fell to former West Virginia congressman John W. Davis. More important to Willkie, though, was a fight against the Ku Klux Klan, which had become powerful in much of the nation and in the Democratic Party, but he and other delegates were unsuccessful in their attempt to include a plank in the party platform condemning the Klan. He also backed a proposed plank in support of the League of Nations that ultimately failed. In 1925, Willkie led a successful effort to oust Klan members on the Akron school board.

After leaving Firestone in 1920, Willkie joined leading Akron law firm Mather & Nesbitt, which represented several local public utilities. Although he quickly gained a reputation as a leading trial lawyer, he was especially noted for presenting utility cases before the Ohio Public Utilities Commission. In 1925, he became president of the Akron Bar Association. One of Willkie's clients, Ohio Power & Light, was owned by New York-based Commonwealth & Southern Corporation (C&S), whose chairman, B.C. Cobb, noticed him. Cobb wrote to the senior partner of Willkie's firm, "I think he is a comer and we should keep an eye on him." In 1929, Cobb offered Willkie a salary of $36,000 (equal to $675,000 today) to be corporate counsel to C&S, a job which would involve a move to New York, and Willkie accepted.

=== Commonwealth & Southern executive ===
Wendell and Edith Willkie moved to New York in October 1929, only weeks before the Wall Street Crash of 1929, and found an apartment overlooking Central Park. Initially intimidated by the size and anonymity of the big city, Wendell Willkie soon learned to love it. He attended the Broadway theatre, and read through ten newspapers each day. Willkie and his wife had little in common, and grew apart through the 1930s. He acquired a social life, and met Irita Van Doren, the book review editor of the New York Herald Tribune who became a friend, and later his lover. Cultured, brilliant and well connected, Van Doren introduced him to new books, new ideas, and new circles of friends. Unlike Van Doren, Willkie was indiscreet about their relationship, and their affair was well known to the reporters covering him during his 1940 presidential campaign. None of them printed a word.

At C&S, Willkie rose rapidly under the eye of Cobb, impressing his superiors. Much of his work was outside New York City; Willkie was brought in to help try important cases or aid in the preparation of major legal briefs. Cobb, a pioneer in the electricity transmission business, had presided over the 1929 merger of 165 utilities that made C&S the largest electric utility holding company in the country. He promoted Willkie over 50 junior executives, designating the younger man as his successor. In January 1933, Willkie became president of C&S.

Willkie maintained his interest in politics, and was a delegate to the 1932 Democratic National Convention. Since the incumbent Republican president, Herbert Hoover, was widely blamed for the Depression that had followed the stock market crash, the nominee would have a good chance of becoming president. The major candidates were Smith (the 1928 nominee), Smith's successor as New York's governor, Franklin D. Roosevelt, Speaker of the House John Nance Garner, and former Secretary of War Newton D. Baker. Willkie backed Baker, and was an assistant floor manager for his campaign. With a two-thirds majority needed to gain the Democratic presidential nomination, Willkie and others tried to deadlock the convention in the hope that it would turn to Baker. Roosevelt was willing to swing his votes to Baker in the event of a stalemate, but this did not occur, as Governor Roosevelt gained the nomination on the fourth ballot. Willkie, although disappointed, backed Roosevelt, and donated $150 to his successful campaign.

=== TVA battle ===
Soon after taking office, President Roosevelt proposed legislation creating the Tennessee Valley Authority (TVA), a government agency with far-reaching influence that promised to bring flood control and cheap electricity to the impoverished Tennessee Valley. However, the TVA would compete with existing private power companies in the area, including C&S subsidiaries. Willkie appeared before the House Military Affairs Committee on April 14, 1933. He approved of the ideas for development of the Tennessee Valley, but felt that the government role should be limited to selling power generated by dams. Although the House of Representatives passed a bill limiting the TVA's powers, the Senate took the opposite stance, and the latter position prevailed.

Willkie (right) and David E. Lilienthal

Negotiations took place through the remainder of 1933 for C&S to sell assets, including a transmission line, to allow the TVA to distribute energy to retail customers, leading to an agreement on January 4, 1934. TVA head David Lilienthal was impressed by Willkie, who left him "somewhat overwhelmed" and "pretty badly scared". C&S agreed to sell some of its properties in part of the Tennessee Valley, and the government agreed that the TVA would not compete with C&S in many areas. In October 1934, holders of securities issued by a C&S subsidiary filed suit to block the transfer. Willkie angrily denied that he had prompted the lawsuit, though plaintiffs' counsel proved later to have been paid by the Edison Electric Institute, of which Willkie was a board member. Willkie warned that New York capital might avoid Tennessee if the TVA experiment continued, and when Roosevelt gave a speech in praise of the agency, issued a statement rebutting him. By 1934, Willkie had become the spokesman for the private electric power industry.

Amid this tension, Willkie and Roosevelt met for the first time, at the White House on December 13, 1934. The meeting was outwardly cordial, but each man told his own version of what occurred: the president boasted of having outtalked Willkie, while the executive sent a soon-to-be-famous telegram to his wife: "CHARM OVERRATED ... I DIDNT TELL HIM WHAT YOU THINK OF HIM". Roosevelt decided that the utility holding companies had to be broken up, stated so in his 1935 State of the Union address, and met with Willkie later in January to inform him of his intent. In the meantime, the companies did their best to sabotage the TVA; farmers were told by corporate representatives that lines from the new Norris Dam could not carry enough power to make a light bulb glow, and the company ran "spite lines" that might not even carry power in an effort to invoke the non-compete agreement over broad areas.

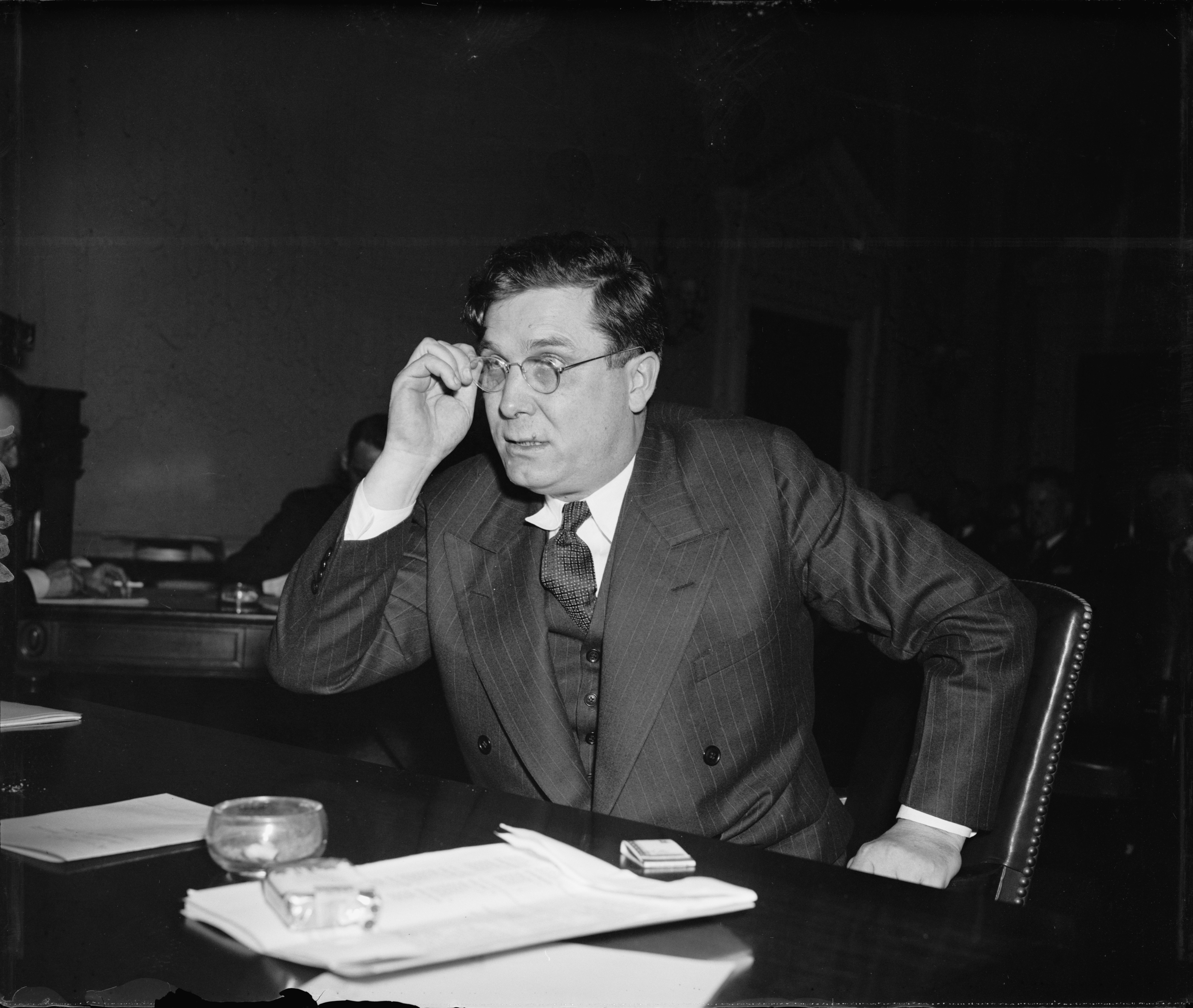
Willkie testifying before a congressional committee, 1939

Through 1935, as the breakup legislation wound through Congress, and litigation through the courts, Willkie was the industry's chief spokesman and lobbyist. When the Senate narrowly passed a bill for the breakup, Willkie made a series of speeches asking the public to oppose the legislation, and a storm of letters to congressmen followed. After the House of Representatives defeated the breakup clause, investigation proved that many of these communications were funded by the electric companies, signed with names taken from the telephone book, though Willkie was not implicated. Amid public anger, Roosevelt pressured Congress to pass a bill requiring the breakup to take place within three years.

In September 1936, Roosevelt and Willkie met again at the White House, and a truce followed as both sides waited to see if Roosevelt would be re-elected over the Republican, Kansas Governor Alf Landon. Willkie, who voted for Landon, expected a narrow victory for the Republican, but Roosevelt won an overwhelming landslide as Landon won only Maine and Vermont. In December, a federal district court judge granted the C&S companies an injunction against the TVA, and negotiations broke off by Roosevelt's order as the litigation continued. Willkie took his case to the people, writing columns for major publications, and proposing terms for an agreement that The New York Times described as "sensible and realistic". He received favorable press, and many invitations to speak.

The January 1938 Supreme Court ruling in Alabama Power Co. v. Ickes, resolving the 1934 case, and the lifting of the injunction by an appeals court, sent the parties back to the negotiating table. Willkie kept the public pressure on: like most corporate executives, he had not spoken out against Roosevelt's New Deal policies, but in January stated in a radio debate that anti-utility policies were depressing share prices, making it hard to attract investment that would help America to recover. "For several years now, we have been listening to a bedtime story, telling us that the men who hold office in Washington are, by their very positions, endowed with a special virtue." The Saturday Evening Post dubbed Willkie "the man who talked back".

Willkie and Lilienthal negotiated for a year, with Willkie wanting $88 million for C&S's properties in and around the Tennessee Valley, and the TVA offering $55 million. After a final, January 1939, legal defeat for C&S in the Supreme Court, the pace of the talks quickened, and on February 1, 1939, C&S sold the assets to the TVA for $78.6 million. Securities and Exchange Commission chairman William O. Douglas deemed Willkie to have outsmarted Lilienthal. Though defeated in the courts, Willkie had gained national stature for driving a hard bargain for his shareholders, and was seen by some as a potential presidential candidate in 1940.

== 1940 presidential election ==
=== Dark horse candidate ===
The 1940 presidential campaign was conducted against the backdrop of World War II raging in Europe. Although the United States remained neutral, the nation—and especially the Republican Party—was deeply divided between isolationists, who felt the nation should avoid any steps that could lead America into the war, and interventionists, who felt that America's survival depended upon helping the Allies defeat Nazi Germany. The three leading candidates for the 1940 Republican nomination were all isolationists to varying degrees: Senators Robert A. Taft of Ohio and Arthur Vandenberg of Michigan, and Thomas E. Dewey, the young (only 38 years old), "gangbusting" Manhattan District Attorney in New York City. Roosevelt's popularity had declined since the 1936 landslide, but many still hoped he would run for an unprecedented third term. He had long contemplated one, but made no announcement. Roosevelt's decision-making on this point is uncertain: as late as April 1940, he may have been thinking of retirement. If he stepped aside, possible candidates included Vice President Garner, Secretary of State Cordell Hull and Postmaster General and patronage handler James A. Farley.

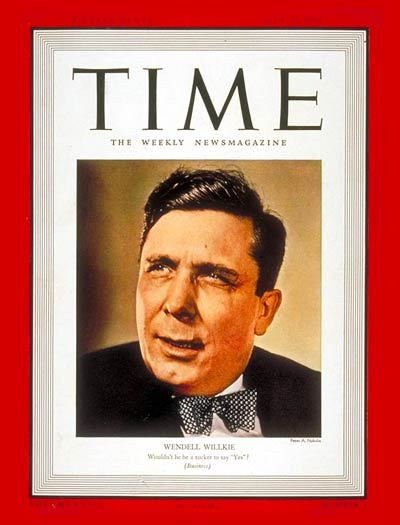
Willkie on the cover of Time magazine, July 31, 1939

On the assumption Roosevelt would not seek a third term, Willkie had been spoken of as a possible Democratic presidential candidate as early as 1937. He raised his stock considerably when on January 3, 1938, he debated Assistant Attorney General Robert H. Jackson on the radio show Town Meeting of the Air. With the topic of the debate being the cooperation between the public and private sectors, Willkie came across as a businessman with a heart, while Jackson appeared dull. A stream of positive press mentions for Willkie continued through 1938 and into 1939, culminating with a favorable cover story in Time magazine in July 1939. Willkie was initially dismissive of the many letters he received urging him to run for president, but soon changed his mind. Van Doren thought Willkie could be president, and worked to persuade her contacts. After hosting the Willkies for a weekend, Fortune magazine managing editor Russell Davenport became convinced Wendell Willkie had presidential timber; he devoted the magazine's April 1940 issue to Willkie, and later served as his campaign manager. In that issue, Willkie wrote an article, "We The People: A Foundation for a Political Platform for Recovery", urging both major parties to omit anti-business policies from their party platforms, protect individual rights, and oppose foreign aggression while supporting world trade. This piece won him applause and supporters from the press.

Willkie never had any doubt that Roosevelt would run for a third term, and that his route to the White House would have to be through the Republican Party. In late 1939 he changed his registration from Democratic to Republican, and early in 1940 announced that he would accept the Republican nomination if it were offered to him. He blamed his allegiance shift on the Roosevelt policies that he deemed anti-business. He had voted for Landon in 1936, he said, and he felt that the Democrats no longer represented the values he advocated. As he later characterized it, "I did not leave my party. My party left me."

The start of the war in September 1939 alarmed Americans, but the majority thought the U.S. should not get involved. Willkie spoke often about the threat to America and the need to aid Britain and other Allies. Willkie biographer Steve Neal wrote that the war "transformed Willkie from a big-business critic of the New Deal into a champion of freedom. And it gave his candidacy new purpose." Despite the chatter about Willkie, there were many who were skeptical about his chances should he seek the nomination. Kenneth F. Simpson, Republican National Committeeman from New York, initially thought the idea of a Willkie run to be silly. Indiana Senator James Eli Watson stated that he did not mind if "the town whore" joined the church, but she should not lead the choir the first week.

Willkie did not enter the Republican primaries, placing his hope in a deadlocked convention. His campaign was composed mostly of political amateurs. New York lawyer Orem Root Jr. (grandnephew of former Secretary of State Elihu Root) formed a network of local Willkie Clubs, which attracted a large membership among Republicans discontented with their leadership and seeking a new figure who might beat Roosevelt. He especially appealed to liberal, Eastern Establishment Republicans who saw none of the declared candidates to their liking. His rumpled suits, country-style haircut, and Indiana twang were reminiscent of ordinary midwesterners, which led to some derision as the efforts to nominate him became more obvious. Interior Secretary Harold L. Ickes mocked Willkie as "a simple, barefoot Wall Street lawyer". Alice Roosevelt Longworth stated that the Willkie campaign came "from the grass roots of ten thousand country clubs".

His failure to enter primaries did not greatly disadvantage Willkie because most were "beauty contests" serving only to show voter preferences and not to elect delegates. The primaries were governed by a complex set of unwritten rules about who would enter which primary and Taft ran only in his native Ohio, where Dewey did not enter his name. Even those delegates who were pledged to support a candidate were not strongly committed: what was important to most Republicans was to field a nominee who could beat Roosevelt. The run-up to the June convention in Philadelphia coincided with Hitler's advance in Western Europe, and delegates had second thoughts about running an isolationist, let alone a young one without national experience such as Dewey. Willkie, who had spoken out against isolationism, and who was a successful executive, was an attractive possibility. Willkie made speeches widely, including in a tour of New England that paid off with promises of support, though delegates might first support a favorite son candidate for a ballot or two. Important converts to Willkie's cause included Minnesota Governor Harold Stassen and Massachusetts Governor Leverett Saltonstall. The move to Willkie was reflected in polls; he went from 3 to 29 percent in the seven weeks before the convention, while Dewey, the frontrunner, fell from 67 to 47 percent.

=== Convention ===
The 1940 Republican National Convention opened at the Philadelphia Civic Center (Note: At the time, more commonly known as Convention Hall) on June 24, 1940. As the delegates assembled, they discussed the war, the candidates, and Roosevelt's appointment of two Republican interventionists to his cabinet four days before the convention. Henry L. Stimson, Secretary of War under President Taft and Secretary of State under Hoover, was restored to the War position, and Landon's 1936 running mate, Frank Knox, was appointed Navy Secretary. The cabinet appointments divided the Republicans, who accused Roosevelt of dirty politics.

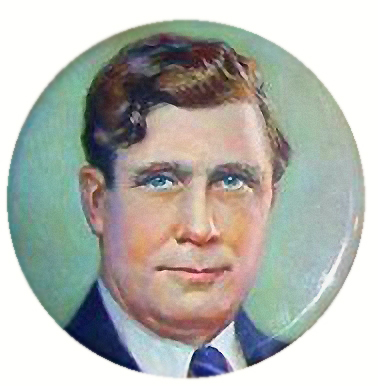
Campaign pin

Willkie arrived by train in Philadelphia on June 22, two days before the convention, and immediately attracted attention by walking from 30th Street Station to his hotel, answering questions from reporters and anyone else who could get close enough to be heard. Dewey, Vandenberg and Taft had large public headquarters, but Willkie's campaign was run from clandestine rooms at the Benjamin Franklin Hotel. Root's Willkie Clubs and other supporters bombarded the delegates with telegrams urging support for their candidate, to the annoyance of some. Key convention officials were Willkie supporters; these included House Minority Leader Joe Martin, Massachusetts' favorite son and permanent chairman of the convention. When the head of the Committee on Arrangements, Ralph Williams (deemed likely to support Taft), died just before the convention, he was succeeded by the vice chairman, Sam Pryor, a firm Willkie backer. This placed a Willkie supporter in charge of tickets for the public galleries. With noted publicist Steve Hannagan, the Willkie campaign gained tremendous momentum.

The opening night of the convention saw the keynote speech by Governor Stassen; (Note: Stassen was then deemed the "Boy Wonder" of the Republican Party; at age 33, he was constitutionally too young to seek the presidency. Age would not in future restrain him from running for president; he would seek the Republican nomination so many times and with so little hope of winning that he became a national joke. See Peters, p. 75) he subsequently announced his support for Willkie and became one of the candidate's floor managers. The second night featured a speech by the only living former president, Herbert Hoover, who hoped to stampede the convention to a third nomination. His address went almost unheard in the hall because of problems with the sound system. In the meantime, the Dewey campaign, faced with the German announcement that with France taken, Hitler's forces would sail on Britain, did its best to stem the flow of delegates to Willkie. Negotiations among Dewey, Taft, and Vandenberg came to nothing because none would accept less than the presidential nomination. A blaze of publicity followed Willkie wherever he went, as he caucused with delegates and appeared at press conferences with supporters, including the entire Connecticut delegation. A strong minority of African Americans still supported the Republicans, and Willkie met with a group of them, urging those delegates to visit him in the White House in 1941.

Indiana Congressman Charles Halleck gave the nominating speech for Willkie on the evening of June 26, arguing that Willkie's recent conversion to the Republican Party was no reason not to nominate him, "is the Republican Party a closed corporation? Do you have to be born into it?" When Halleck mentioned Willkie's name, there were initially boos from some delegates, but they were quickly drowned out by those in the public balconies, who thunderously chanted, "We want Willkie!". Pryor had cut ticket allocations to delegations that were not for Willkie, and distributed thousands of standing room passes to Willkie partisans. The vocal support for Willkie among spectators led to complaints that other campaigns had been shorted in the distribution of tickets, but provided one of the convention's most dramatic moments.

Dewey had predicted he would have 400 of the 501 votes needed to be nominated on the first ballot and he kept nothing in reserve so that he might show momentum in future ballots. When delegates first balloted on the afternoon of June 27, he had only 360 to 189 for Taft, 105 for Willkie, and 76 for Vandenberg. On the second ballot, Dewey began to slip, falling to 338 to Taft's 203 and 171 for Willkie. The losses greatly damaged Dewey's campaign, because other than the trivial losses suffered in the early rounds of balloting by Warren G. Harding in 1920, no Republican candidate had ever lost support from the previous ballot and won the nomination. Dewey came under pressure from his advisors to withdraw during the dinner break that followed the second ballot, and when the convention resumed to chants of "We want Willkie!" from the packed galleries, Dewey continued to slip as the convention became a two-horse race between Taft and Willkie. Listening by radio from his hotel room, Willkie refused to make a deal to get support from Taft delegates in exchange for making the Ohioan his running mate, and became convinced he would lose on the fifth ballot. Dewey had planned to go to the convention and withdraw, hoping to stop Willkie by endorsing Taft, but by the time he decided this, the fifth ballot was about to begin and he could not get to the Civic Center in time. Willkie led with 429 delegates after the fifth ballot, while Taft held 377 and Dewey only 57. The large states whose votes still were not committed to one of the two leaders were Pennsylvania (Governor Arthur James was the favorite son) and Michigan, most of whose delegates stayed with Senator Vandenberg. Although Willkie had thus far refrained from making deals, to get Michigan he agreed to allow the Republican organization there to pick that state's federal judges. The sixth ballot, held at 12:20 am on June 28, saw Taft, then Willkie take the lead. As those in the gallery continued to call for Willkie, Vandenberg released his delegates, most of whom went to Willkie. Pennsylvania also broke for him, making Willkie the Republican nominee for president on a vote that was made unanimous.

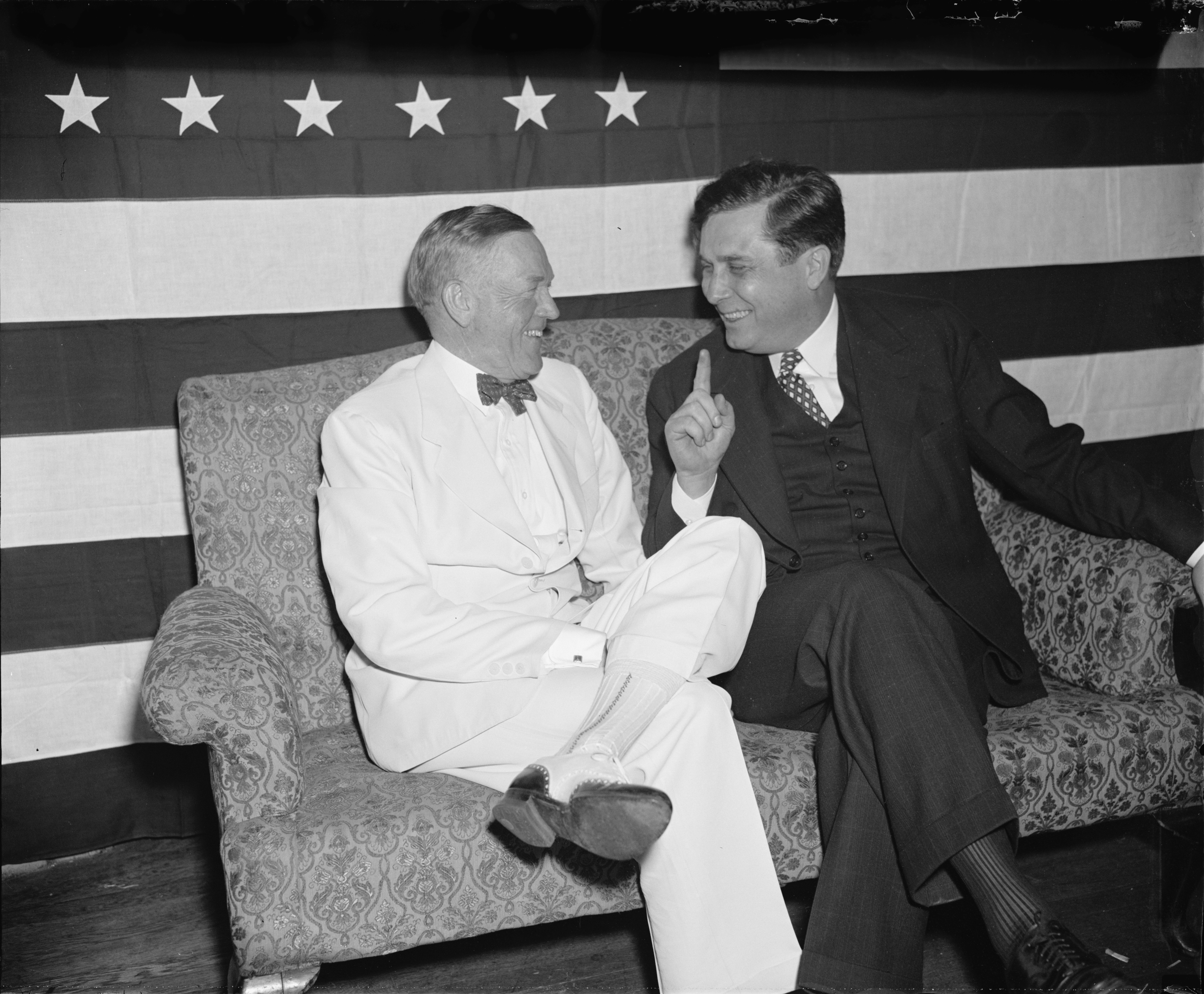
Willkie (right) with running mate Charles McNary

Willkie had offered the vice presidential nomination to Connecticut Governor Raymond Baldwin, a key supporter, but scuttled those plans after his advisors and Republican officials felt that a New York-Connecticut ticket would not give sufficient geographic balance. They urged Willkie to select Senator Charles McNary of Oregon instead. A lawyer, advocate of public power, and farmer, McNary was popular and respected in the West. Willkie agreed, and got Baldwin to withdraw as others persuaded McNary, who had called Willkie a tool of Wall Street after arriving in Philadelphia. The convention dutifully nominated McNary. Before departing Philadelphia, Willkie went to the Civic Center to appear before the delegates who had chosen him, becoming the first Republican nominee to speak to the convention after gaining its endorsement:

Democracy and our way of life is facing the most crucial test it has ever faced in all its long history; and we here are not Republicans, alone, but Americans, to dedicate ourselves to the democratic way of life in the United States because here stands the last firm, untouched foothold of freedom in all the world.

=== General election campaign ===
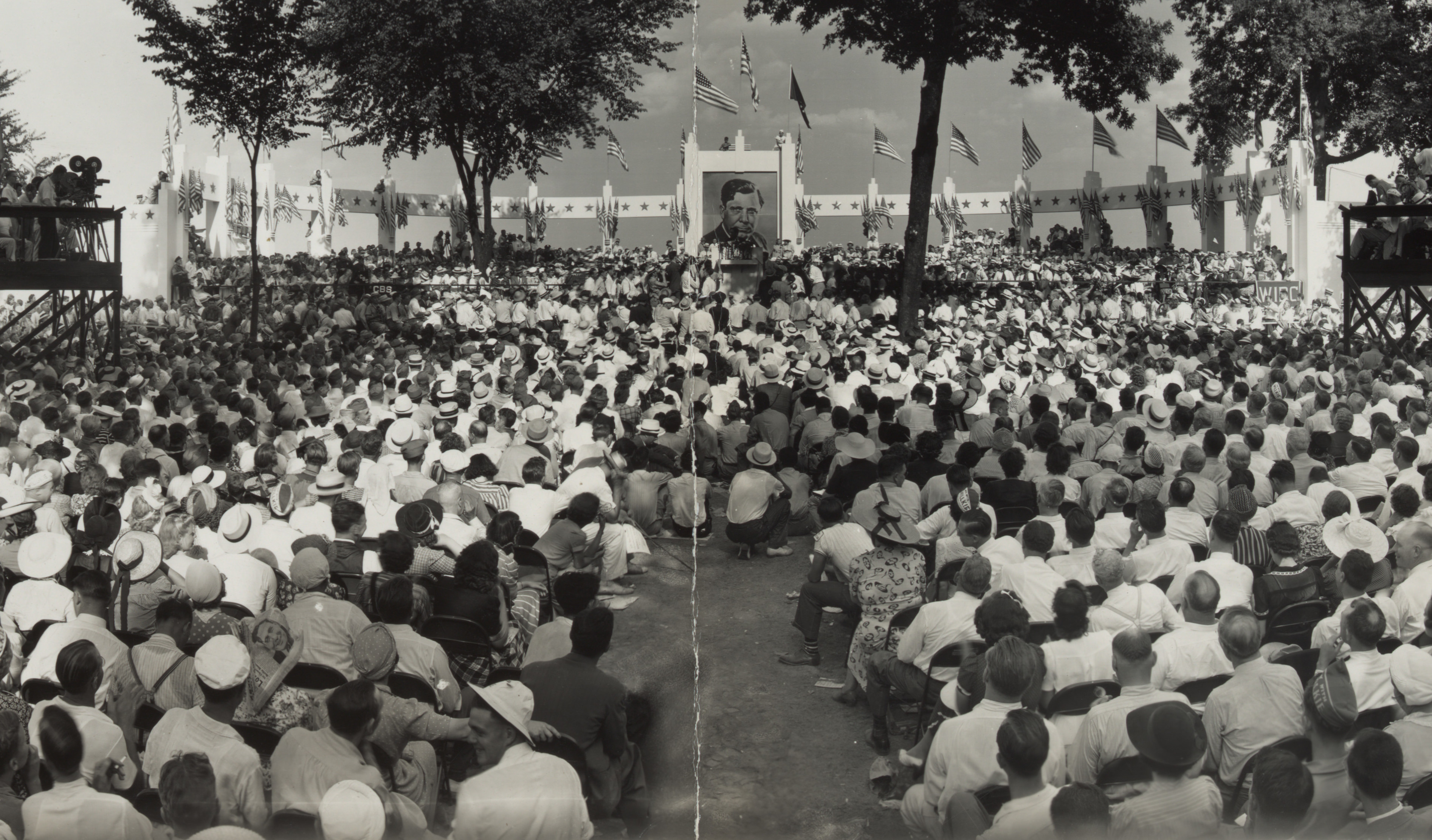
Willkie formally accepts his nomination at a ceremony in Elwood, Indiana August 17, 1940

After the convention, Willkie returned to New York. When he went to the movies or play, he received a standing ovation. He resigned from C&S on July 8, 1940, confident that even if he lost his presidential bid, he would not lack for work. He had Republican National Committee (RNC) chairman John Hamilton dismissed on the advice of some of his advisors, who felt Hamilton was too conservative and isolationist, though the former chairman was given the post of executive director with partial responsibility for the Willkie campaign. Congressman Martin became RNC chair. At a time when little campaigning was done until after Labor Day, Willkie left on a five-week working vacation to The Broadmoor, a resort in Colorado Springs, but found neither peace nor privacy.

Roosevelt had been surprised by the outcome of the Republican convention, having expected to oppose a conservative isolationist. The polls showed Willkie behind by only six points, and the president expected this to be a more difficult race than he had faced in his defeats of Hoover and Landon. Roosevelt felt that Willkie's nomination would remove the war issue from the campaign. Roosevelt was nominated by the Democratic convention in Chicago in July, though he stated that because of the world crisis, he would not actively campaign, leaving that to surrogates. The fact that both major-party presidential candidates favored intervention frustrated isolationists, who considered wooing Charles Lindbergh as a third-party candidate.

Willkie formally accepted the nomination at Elwood on August 17 before a crowd of at least 150,000, the largest political gathering in U.S. history to that point. It was an extremely hot day, and Willkie, who tried to read his speech from a typed manuscript without enlargement, failed to ignite the crowd. He remained in Rushville, where he owned farmland, over the next month, trying to become more associated with his native state than with Wall Street. He gave interviews to reporters there, and his firm support of Roosevelt's aid to the Allies led Congressman Martin and Senator McNary to support a peacetime draft despite the strident objections of many Republicans and some Democrats. Roosevelt contacted Willkie through intermediaries to ensure the Republican candidate would not make a political issue out of the Destroyers for Bases Agreement; Willkie was supportive of the transfer, though he felt Congress should act, and opposed Roosevelt sending armaments to Britain by executive order.

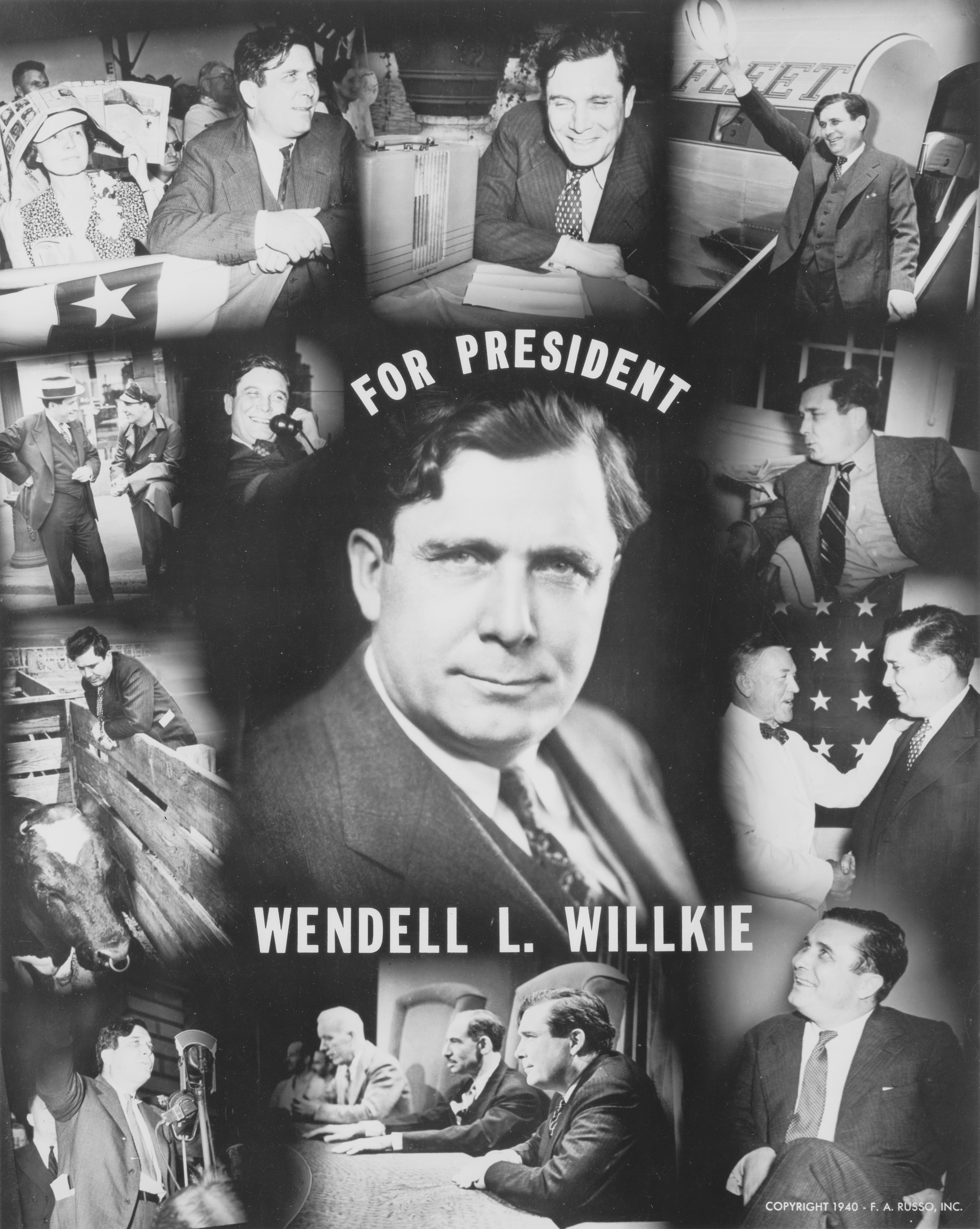
"Willkie for President" poster

Conservatives and isolationists had little enthusiasm for the Willkie campaign, and the moderates wanted to see stronger positions on progressive issues and foreign policy. Publisher Henry Luce decried both Roosevelt and Willkie for failing to be honest with the American people, "America will never be ready for any war until she makes her mind up there is going to be a war." (italics in original) Despite his pledge not to campaign, Roosevelt made inspection tours to military installations, well covered by the press. The president did not mention Willkie by name, seeking to avoid giving him publicity. According to Susan Dunn in her book in the 1940 campaign, this forced Willkie "to box against a phantom opponent and carry on a one-sided partisan debate ... Even in Willkie's speeches, Roosevelt occupied center stage". Willkie promised to keep New Deal social welfare programs intact, expand Social Security, and provide full employment, a job for everyone: "I pledge a new world".

On September 12, Willkie began a whistle-stop tour by train, and between then and November 2, he reached 31 of the 48 states. He did not visit the Solid South, though he spoke in Texas, hoping to win it as Hoover had in 1928. Willkie filled the Los Angeles Coliseum with 70,000 middle-class supporters, but reporters saw few working-class people at his rallies, and he cancelled some appearances at auto plants in the Midwest. Other people in working-class areas booed the candidate, held up signs in support of Roosevelt, or pelted his motorcade with overripe fruit. Although Edith Willkie accompanied her husband on his tour (he had little time for contact with Van Doren), she disliked the media attention and did not give interviews, completing the campaign without ever giving a speech. On one occasion, she looked at her husband and stated, "Politics makes strange bedfellows". The Democrats knew of Willkie's affair with Van Doren, but the Republicans had letters from Henry A. Wallace, the Democratic vice presidential nominee, to his former guru, Russian mystic Nicholas Roerich, and neither issue became a factor in the campaign.

With polls released on October 6 showing Roosevelt well ahead, Willkie began to sound an isolationist theme, accusing Roosevelt of being a warmonger. Many of Willkie's speeches to that point had been on domestic issues, but he had been advised by Martin, Hamilton, and other advisors that the war was the issue the voters really cared about. Willkie began to argue that Roosevelt would not keep the U.S. out of war, but that he would. He was given room to make this argument by the United Kingdom's increasing success in the Battle of Britain, as it was clear a German invasion was not imminent. The polls showed voters responding positively to this new tack, and Willkie kept on this course for the remainder of the campaign. Roosevelt reacted by scheduling five speeches for the final days, in which he proposed to rebut Willkie's "falsifications". The president stated, "I have said this before, but I shall say it again and again and again. Your boys are not going to be sent into any foreign war." Willkie was prone to ad lib remarks, which sometimes led to gaffes: addressing steelworkers, he pledged to appoint a new Secretary of Labor, "and it will not be a woman either". This allusion to Secretary Frances Perkins, the only woman to hold a cabinet position in American history to that point, did not aid him among female voters.

The results of the election, with those states taken by Willkie in red

Willkie concluded his campaign on November 2 with a large rally at New York's Madison Square Garden. Polls showed him four points behind Roosevelt, but with a trend towards the Republicans. Many pundits expected a tight race. On Election Day, November 5, 1940, the returns were initially encouraging, but quickly turned against Willkie. By 11 pm, radio commentators were reporting that Roosevelt had won a third term. Willkie received 45 percent of the popular vote to Roosevelt's 55 percent. The president received 27.2 million votes to Willkie's 22.3 million, and won 449 to 82 in the Electoral College. Willkie won 10 states to the president's 38 though he did better than Hoover and Landon had against Roosevelt. Willkie's popular vote total of 22,348,480 set a record for a Republican not broken until Eisenhower in 1952.

The endorsement of CIO head John L. Lewis probably gave Willkie Michigan, and he gained ground in the suburbs and rural areas, but Roosevelt consolidated his 1936 coalition of working-class Americans, ethnics, and white Southerners to take the election. On the evening of November 11, Willkie gave a nationwide radio address, urging those who had voted for him not to oppose Roosevelt on all issues, but to give support where it was called for. In late November, Willkie interrupted a Florida vacation for a speech he concluded by offering a toast "to the health and happiness of the President of the United States"; Roosevelt confided to his son James: "I'm happy I've won, but I'm sorry Wendell lost".

== Activist and statesman (1940–1943) ==
=== Visit to the United Kingdom ===
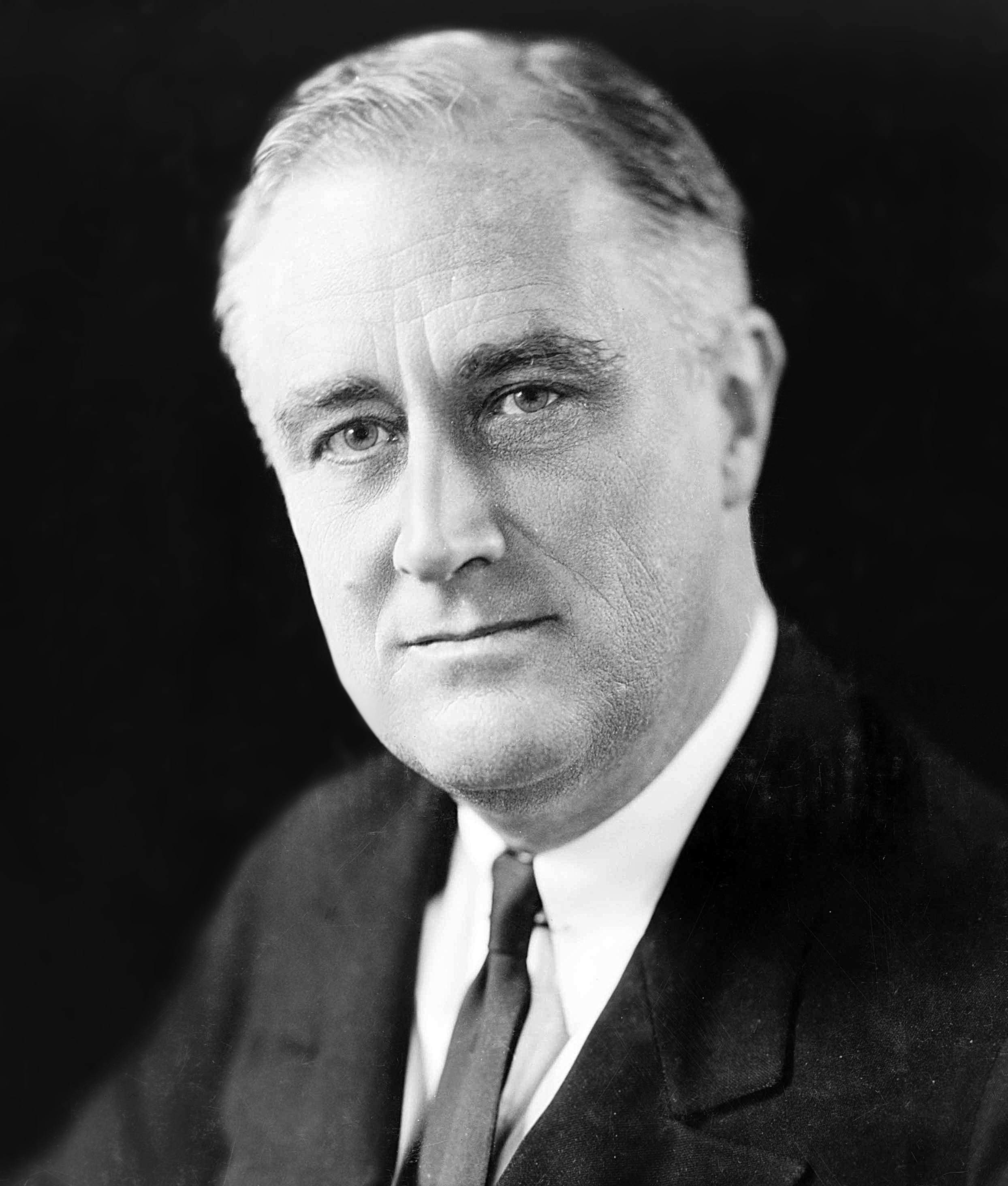
Roosevelt asked Willkie to serve as his informal envoy in Britain.

Although defeated in the election, Willkie had become a major figure on the public scene, and at age 48, was deemed likely to remain one for years to come. Landon had received some 6,000 letters commiserating with him in his defeat; Willkie received over 100,000. Financially independent, he was in no hurry to decide among the many offers of employment from top law firms and major corporations. He resumed his affair with Van Doren.

While on vacation, Willkie decided his next cause should be military aid to embattled Britain, and announced support of the president's Lend-Lease program on January 13, 1941. Lend-Lease was highly unpopular in the Republican Party, and Willkie's announcement caused significant controversy, with Landon and Taft decrying his actions. Former RNC chairman Hamilton wrote that of the almost 200 Republican members of the House and Senate, "Willkie couldn't dig up ten friends if his life depended on it."

Roosevelt, both appreciating Willkie's talents, and seeking to divide and conquer his opposition, had been mulling over ways his former opponent might be of use. The president's onetime advisor, Justice Felix Frankfurter, had suggested that Willkie should travel across the Atlantic to demonstrate bipartisan support of Britain. Willkie had already been planning a visit in support for Britain. Roosevelt believed that the visit of the nominal head of the opposition party would be far more effective in demonstrating American support than sending one of his advisors.

Willkie visited the president at the White House for the first time as an ally on January 19, 1941, the evening before Roosevelt's third swearing-in. The president asked Willkie to be his informal personal representative to Britain, and Willkie accepted. Eleanor Roosevelt recorded that family members and White House staff found excuses to observe Willkie, and she would have done so herself had she been aware of the visit as it was happening. Roosevelt urged Willkie to see W. Averell Harriman and Harry Hopkins, both in London on missions from Roosevelt, and gave his former rival a letter to be hand-delivered to the British prime minister, Winston Churchill. At this time it was not routine for politicians to travel abroad; McNary, with considerable influence in foreign affairs, had never left North America. Thus, there was much public attention to Willkie's mission. He departed from New York Municipal Field for London on January 22.

Upon arrival, Willkie told the press, "I want to do all I can to get the United States to give England the utmost aid possible in her struggle". Willkie saw the damage Nazi bombing had inflicted on Britain, visiting bombed-out sites in London, Birmingham, Coventry, Manchester and Liverpool. In London during the Blitz, he walked the streets at night without helmet or gas mask (until Churchill gave him some), visiting bomb shelters. Churchill hosted Willkie at an official luncheon at 10 Downing Street and had him as a guest at Chequers. In his writings, Churchill recalled "a long talk with this most able and forceful man".

Although it was cut short by Roosevelt's desire to have him testify before Congress on Lend-Lease, Willkie's visit to Britain was deemed a triumph. Willkie also went to Ireland, hoping to persuade Éamon de Valera to abandon neutrality, but his urging was unavailing. Willkie left London for Washington on February 5; because of the risk of being shot down by Nazi aircraft, the roundabout journey home took four days. He testified before the Senate Foreign Relations Committee on February 11, and his support was key to passing Lend-Lease.

Willkie's Senate testimony made him the leading interventionist outside the government, with Lindbergh (who had testified against Lend-Lease) the leading isolationist, and they debated in the pages of magazines. Roosevelt weighed in, backing his former opponent in a radio address on March 29. "The leader of the Republican Party himself—Mr. Wendell Willkie—in word and in action is showing what patriotic Americans mean by rising above partisanship and rallying to the common cause." That same month, a Gallup poll showed that 60 percent of Americans believed Willkie would have made a good president.

In April 1941, Willkie joined the New York law firm of Miller, Boston, and Owen as a senior partner, with the firm changing its name to Willkie, Owen, Otis, Farr, and Gallagher. Two months later, he agreed to represent motion picture producers before a Senate subcommittee which was investigating claims that Hollywood was producing pro-war propaganda. Willkie defended the rights of the studios to make films that reflected their views, and warned, "the rights of the individuals mean nothing if freedom of speech and freedom of the press are destroyed." Congress took no further action.

In late 1941, Willkie fought for the repeal of the Neutrality Act. In September, Lindbergh accused American Jews of "agitating for war"; Willkie responded that the aviator's speech was "the most un-American made in my time". Willkie lobbied Republican congressmen to repeal the act. The measure passed Congress with the aid of Republican votes, though most of that party voted against it. Roosevelt invited Willkie to dedicate Mount Rushmore, but because of other commitments, Willkie could not. Roosevelt also sought to have Willkie join his administration, which the Republican was reluctant to do, wishing to preserve independence of word and action.

=== Wartime advocate ===
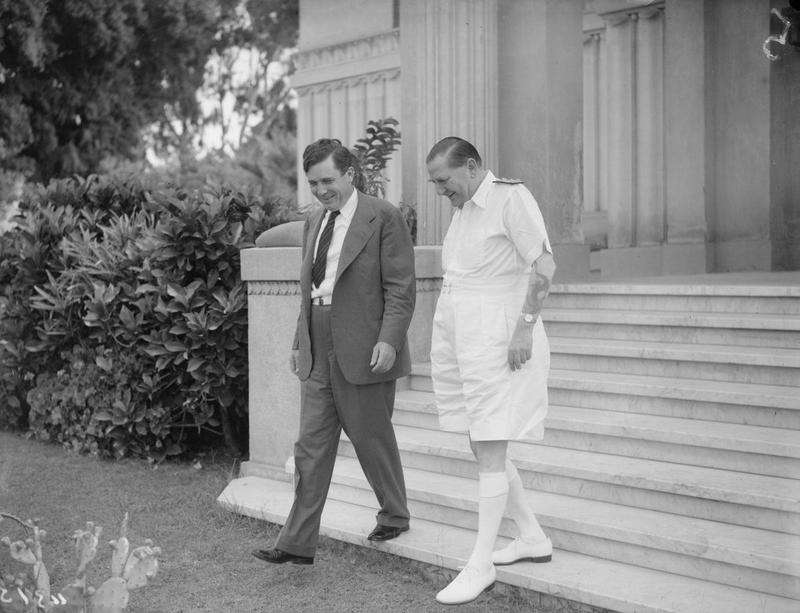
Willkie with Admiral Sir Henry Harwood, Alexandria, Egypt

After the Japanese attack on Pearl Harbor on December 7, 1941, Willkie offered his full support to Roosevelt. Willkie was interested in the post of war production czar, but that position went to Donald M. Nelson. Labor Secretary Perkins offered to have Willkie arbitrate between management and labor in war industries, but Willkie declined after White House officials informed the press. In early 1942, Willkie considered a run for Governor of New York. He later stated that Roosevelt had been willing to endorse him, but Willkie ultimately concluded that the Dewey forces were too strong and a defeat might eliminate him from a possible run for president in 1944. In July, Willkie proposed to Roosevelt that he go on another foreign mission, and the following month Willkie announced that he would be visiting the Soviet Union, China, and the Middle East. Dewey wrote, "I hear he is going to Russia before the Republican [state] convention, so he will be where he belongs and I hope he stays there until Christmas".

According to Dunn, Willkie's mission was to be Roosevelt's personal representative, "demonstrating American unity, gathering information, and discussing with key heads of state plans for the postwar future". After leaving the U.S. on August 26, Willkie's first stop was in North Africa, where he met General Montgomery and toured the front at El Alamein. In Beirut, he stayed with General de Gaulle, leader of the Free French. In Jerusalem, Willkie met with Jews and Arabs, told the British rulers of Palestine that both peoples should be brought into the government, and he later wrote that the conflict there was so ancient, it was unrealistic to think that it could "be solved by good will and simple honesty". Willkie had been moved to add the Soviet Union to his itinerary when three Western reporters there urged him by telegram to do so. There, he met with Stalin, and upon his return he advocated more liberal Lend-Lease terms for the USSR. In China, Willkie was hosted by Chiang Kai-shek and was deeply fascinated by Madame Chiang. Willkie was taken to the front in order to observe the Chinese military forces in their fight against the Japanese, and he spoke out against colonialism, in China and elsewhere. His statements were reported widely in Britain, angering Churchill, who responded by saying, "We mean to hold our own. I have not become the King's First Minister in order to preside over the liquidation of the British Empire."

We both came in amity,
Wartime allies of the KMT
While you were feted at the seat of honor
I was fettered in this penal horror.
Diplomatic affections may run hot and cold,
Such is the way of the world,
Or as the French say, C'est la vie,
All waters flow down to the sea.

— Ho Chi Minh, "On Reading of Wendell Willkie's Reception in China"

While in the USSR, Willkie urged the opening of a second front against the Germans; when reporters asked Roosevelt about those comments, the president responded flippantly by saying that he had read the headlines but had not considered the speculative comments worth the reading. This angered Willkie, and on his return from his 49-day trip, he confronted Roosevelt about it when making his report at the White House.

=== The Willkie moment ===
On October 26, 1942, Willkie made a "Report to the People", telling Americans about his trip in a radio speech heard by about 36 million people. The following April, he published One World, a book Van Doren edited, in which he recounted his travels and urged America to join a supernational global organization after the war was successfully concluded. The book was an immediate bestseller, selling a million copies in its first month. It was especially influential because Willkie was seen by many as having transcended partisan politics. According to The Idealist, Willkie was interested in creating 'a body of public opinion' to force policymakers and politicians of both parties to embrace the robust multilateralism he envisioned.

This period of time, between Willkie's trip in 1942 and his abrupt death in 1944, was coined the "Willkie moment" by historian Samuel Zipp and represented the "high point for American visions of war time internationalism." According to Zipp, Willkie's moment revived the earlier "Wilsonian moment," a period marked by European support for President Wilson's idealist foreign policy in the aftermath of WW1, and expanded its terms by emphasizing the vast networks of connectivity between different nations. Zipp argues that this "Willkie moment" was characterized by Willkie's three imagined geographies of the world. The first was "titular universalism," or the idea that the new modes of travel and communication were rapidly shrinking borders and encouraging international collaboration and decolonization. The second geography reframed the true global conflict as not about freedom versus fascism but racism versus empire, thus challenging the morality of both European colonialism and American segregation. Willkie's call to put an end to "our imperialisms at home" in One World was the first time that many Americans had heard such a public figure cast doubt on US domestic policy around race. Despite his optimistic outlook on a future defined by international collaboration and racial equality, Zipp contends that Willkie's third geography was one of "empire obscured."

=== Civil rights activism ===
During his 1940 campaign, Willkie had pledged to integrate the civil service and armed forces, and proudly pointed to what he deemed the strongest civil rights plank in history in the Republican platform. He also promised to end racial segregation in Washington, D.C. He gained the endorsements of the two largest African American newspapers, the Pittsburgh Courier and the Baltimore Afro-American. With Willkie running to the left of Roosevelt on civil rights, Roosevelt feared that blacks would return to their traditional home in the Republican Party, and he secured several prominent promotions or hirings of African Americans. Roosevelt was successful in keeping the majority of the black vote. After the election, Willkie promised to keep fighting for civil rights.

Willkie warned Republicans that only a full commitment to equal rights for minorities would woo African Americans back to the party, and he criticized Roosevelt for yielding to Southern racists among the Democrats. Willkie addressed a convention of the National Association for the Advancement of Colored People (NAACP) in 1942, one of the most prominent politicians to do so up to that point. He urged integration of the armed forces, and when a violent race riot broke out in Detroit in June 1943, he went on national radio in order to criticize both parties for ignoring racial issues. When the movie hearings of 1941 ended without further action, Willkie had been made chairman of the board of Twentieth-Century Fox. In 1943, he worked with Walter White, executive secretary of the NAACP, to try to convince Hollywood to give blacks better treatment in films. Movie moguls promised changes, and some films featured blacks in major roles, but faced with objections from white Southerners, they reverted to giving blacks stereotyped roles after Willkie's death in 1944, such as servants. After his death, the NAACP named its headquarters the Wendell Willkie Memorial Building.

On November 9, 1942, soon after making his reports to Roosevelt and the American people, Willkie argued the case of Schneiderman v. United States before the Supreme Court. William Schneiderman, secretary of the California Communist Party, was a naturalized American until the government revoked his citizenship, stating that he had concealed his membership on his application for naturalization in 1927. Two lower federal courts upheld the denaturalization. Representing a communist, even in wartime, did nothing to shore up Willkie's diminishing support in the Republican Party, but he wrote to a friend saying, "I am sure I am right in representing Schneiderman. Of all the times when civil liberties should be defended, it is now." In his argument Willkie quoted Abraham Lincoln and Thomas Jefferson by saying that the people could, if they deemed it necessary, remake the government, and he stated that Marx's view of revolution was mild by comparison. In 1943, the Supreme Court ruled for Schneiderman, 5–3, restoring his citizenship. Although Willkie refrained from criticizing Roosevelt's internment of Japanese Americans, he stated in a speech that war was no excuse for depriving groups of people of their rights. He spoke out against those who blamed the Jews for the war, warning against "witch-hanging and mob-baiting". For his activities, he received the American Hebrew Medal for 1942.

== 1944 presidential campaign ==
Willkie spent much of 1943 preparing for a second presidential run, addressing Republican and nonpartisan groups. He did not meet with Roosevelt; with the presidential election approaching and with both men likely to run in it as candidates, their continued association would have been awkward. Although they differed with him on many issues, Republican leaders recognized Willkie's appeal and they had wanted him to campaign for the party in the 1942 midterm elections, but he went around the world instead. The huge publicity received by the titular head of the Republican Party as an emissary for a Democratic president frustrated leading Republicans. In 1942, the Republicans gained seats in both the House and the Senate. Though they still remained in the minority, they formed a Conservative coalition with Southern Democrats that took control of domestic issues in Congress. Few Republican members of Congress were by then willing to support Willkie, and he dropped to second place behind General Douglas MacArthur in polls of likely voters in the party's 1944 presidential primaries. By 1943, even liberal Democrats did not doubt Willkie's progressive credentials. He spoke of appointing an African American to either the cabinet or the Supreme Court, and he warned California's Republican committee that the New Deal was irreversible and he stated that all they would get by opposing it was oblivion.

Willkie made his candidacy clear in an interview with Look magazine in early October 1943, arguing that a return to isolationism would lead the party to disaster. He decided to enter several presidential primaries in order to demonstrate his public support of the party, and he chose Wisconsin, with a primary on April 4, 1944, as the first major test. Willkie had not taken Wisconsin's electoral votes in 1940, though he had won in all parts of the state except Milwaukee. His advisors feared the large German-American vote in Wisconsin, which had contributed to the state being firmly isolationist until Pearl Harbor. None of the other major candidates—Dewey, Stassen, MacArthur and Ohio Governor John Bricker—spoke in Wisconsin; MacArthur and Stassen were on active duty and could not do so. Willkie stated that if he did badly in Wisconsin, he would end his campaign.

The New Hampshire primary had not taken on the significance it later would, and Willkie won it on March 14, taking six out of eleven delegates. This was deemed a disappointment because he had spoken there many times since 1940, and was expected to do better. In Wisconsin, Willkie ran a slate of delegates led by future governor Vernon W. Thomson, and he devoted two weeks to campaigning there. He was endorsed by most newspapers, but polls showed him well behind Dewey both in the state and nationwide.

On March 16, his first day of campaigning in Wisconsin, Willkie made eight speeches, and the pace took a toll on his voice. The weather did not cooperate, and he travelled 200 miles (320 km) through a blizzard to reach a rally in the northern part of the state. Willkie attracted large crowds in most places, and he told them that the Republican party would fail unless it accepted the New Deal and recognized the need for the U.S. to remain active in the world after the war. The Democrats, he alleged, had been in office too long and they did not have the vision that was needed in the postwar world. Willkie's speech in Milwaukee attracted 4,000 people to a hall that could hold 6,000, and he left the state on the 29th for Nebraska, where he had also entered the primary. Once he was gone, Dewey's backers, including most of the Wisconsin Republican leadership, flooded the state with billboard advertisements and radio commercials. On April 4, Dewey gained 17 of Wisconsin's 24 delegates, Stassen 4, and MacArthur 3. Willkie's delegates ran last in every district. The following night, after giving his speech in Omaha, Willkie addressed the crowd:

I quite deliberately entered the Wisconsin primary to test whether the Republican voters of that state would support me ... It is obvious now that I cannot be nominated. I therefore am asking my friends to desist from any activity toward that end and not to present my name at the convention. I earnestly hope that the Republican convention will nominate a candidate and write a platform that really represents the views which I have advocated and which I believe are shared by millions of Americans. I shall continue to work for these principles and policies for which I have fought during the last five years.

== Final months and death ==
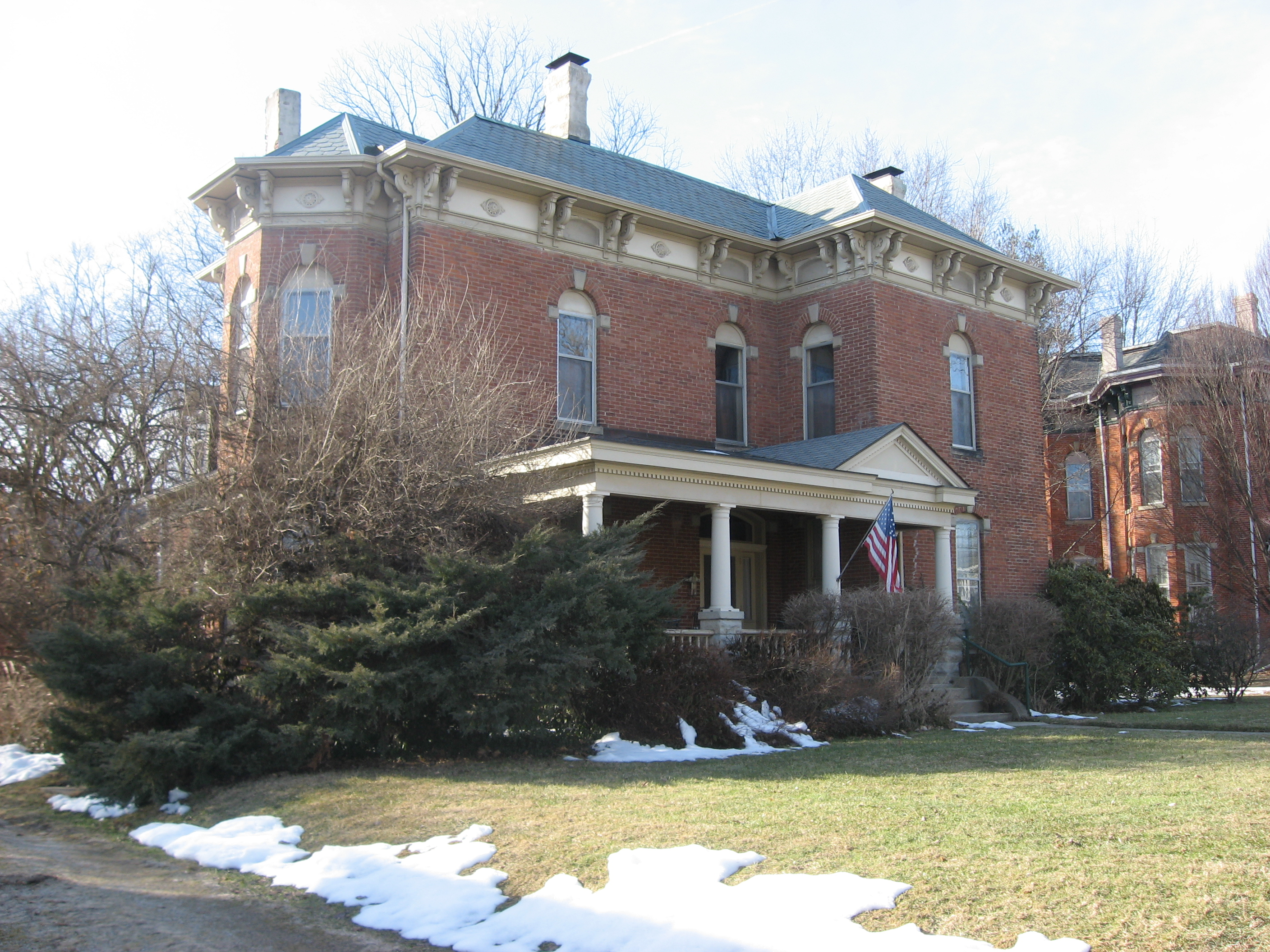
Willkie's home in Rushville, Indiana, was added to the National Register of Historic Places in 1993

Defeated in his second bid for the White House, Willkie announced that he was returning to the practice of law, but his friends doubted that he would be content there. Roosevelt was anxious to dump Vice President Wallace from the ticket in his bid for a fourth term, and he had an intermediary sound out Willkie about running in Wallace's place. Willkie was reluctant even to respond, knowing that Roosevelt had made promises to potential running mates which he did not follow through on. There were further discussions between Willkie and the White House, of which third parties were aware though the details are not known; the vice presidential nomination went to Harry S. Truman. Willkie got Roosevelt interested in a new liberal party which would be formed once peace came that would combine the left of the two existing major parties, but Willkie broke off contact with the White House after there were leaks of this to the press, because he felt that Roosevelt had used him for political gain. Roosevelt sent a letter expressing his regret for the leak, but that too was printed in the papers, and Willkie stated, "I've been lied to for the last time."

In spite of their breach, Roosevelt continued to try to conciliate Willkie. Roosevelt's son Elliott later stated that his father hoped to have Willkie be the first Secretary General of the United Nations, and the two men agreed to meet later in the year. Willkie had not been invited to speak at the 1944 Republican National Convention in Chicago that nominated Dewey for president, and he declined a pass as an "honored guest". Dewey hoped to get Willkie's endorsement, and he sent his foreign policy advisor, John Foster Dulles, to see Willkie. The former candidate refused to be drawn, and he made no endorsement before he died. Willkie wrote two articles for Collier's, one urging an internationalist foreign policy, and the other demanding advances in civil rights for African Americans. He also explored becoming a newspaper publisher.

Willkie had long been neglectful of his health and diet, smoking heavily and rarely exercising. His heavy drinking had charmed the reporters in Philadelphia in 1940, but by 1944 it was becoming a problem. In August 1944, Willkie felt weak while traveling by train to his Rushville home. There, he suffered a heart attack, but he had to be persuaded to see a doctor and he refused to be admitted to a hospital.

Willkie's condition only worsened as the weeks went on. He went to New York by rail in mid-September, but on the trip he was stricken with another heart attack. Although his advisors told him to seek treatment and abandon the trip, Willkie pressed on. When he arrived in New York, Willkie was in great pain and his press secretary called an ambulance to take him to Lenox Hill Hospital. He recovered to some extent, enough so that his friends expected him to be discharged. He spent time working on the galleys of his second book, An American Program, and planned future projects. On October 4, Willkie caught a throat infection, which was treated with penicillin. As he was recovering, Willkie's now chronic heart attacks struck again and he suffered three more attacks on October 7. The hospital, which had been issuing reassuring bulletins to the public, was now forced to inform the public that Willkie's condition had worsened and that he was critically ill. The next morning, Willkie suffered one last attack, which proved fatal. He had suffered over a dozen heart attacks in Lenox Hill Hospital.

Roosevelt released a statement applauding Willkie's "tremendous courage" which "prompted him more than once to stand alone ... In this hour of grave crisis the nation loses a great citizen." War Secretary Stimson offered to have Willkie buried in Arlington National Cemetery, but Edith Willkie wanted her husband to be buried in his native Indiana, at Rushville. His casket was placed in the center aisle of the Fifth Avenue Presbyterian Church; 60,000 people filed by his casket, and 35,000 crowded around the church during the service, including many blacks—as, Eleanor Roosevelt noted in her column, was fitting. Wendell and Edith Willkie rest together in Rushville's East Hill Cemetery, the gravesite was marked by a cross, and a book was carved in stone, designed by sculptor Malvina Hoffman, and inscribed with quotations from One World.

== Legacy and remembrance ==
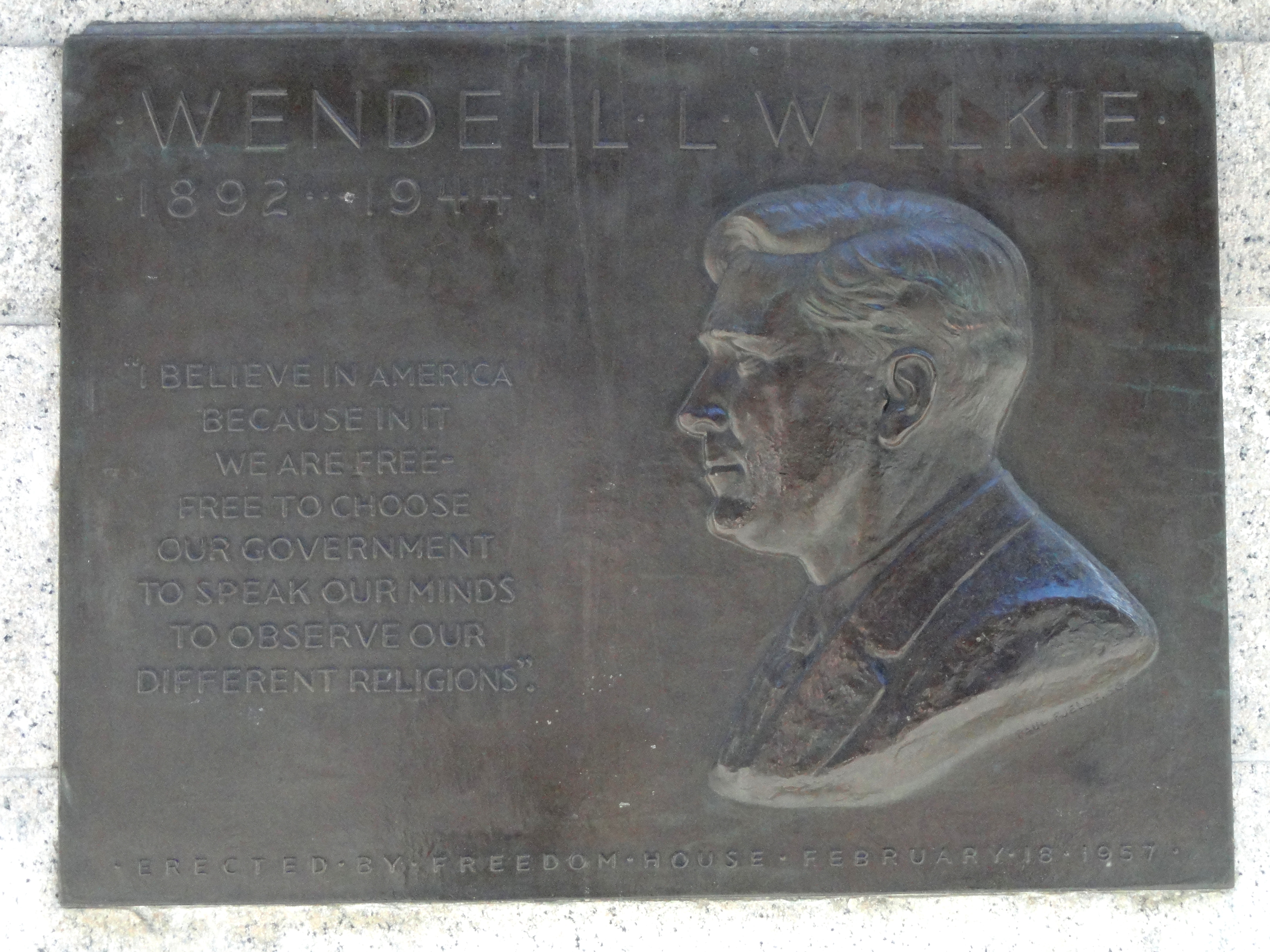
Plaque dedicated to Willkie outside the main branch of the New York Public Library

Soon after the 1940 convention, Roosevelt described Willkie's nomination as a "Godsend to our country", because it ensured that the presidential race would not turn on the issue of aid to Britain. Walter Lippmann believed Willkie's nomination to have been crucial to Britain's survival, "second only to the Battle of Britain, the sudden rise and nomination of Willkie was the decisive event, perhaps providential, which made it possible to rally the free world when [Britain] was almost conquered. Under any other leadership but his the Republican party in 1940 would have turned its back on Great Britain, causing all who resisted Hitler to feel abandoned". Charles Peters wrote that "it is arguable that [Willkie's] impact on [the United States] and the world was greater than that of most men who actually held the office [of president]. At a crucial moment in history, he stood for the right things at the right time." When Georgia Senator Zell Miller, a Democrat, gave the keynote address at the 2004 Republican National Convention, he urged unity instead of partisan strife in the war on terror, and recalled Willkie's actions, "He gave Roosevelt the critical support he needed for a peacetime draft, an unpopular idea at the time. And he made it clear that he would rather lose the election than make national security a partisan campaign issue."

Historian Hugh Ross argued that in gaining the nomination, Willkie "gave exceptional promise of being a winner. There were ample precedents from American political history in which a minority party, queasy over prospects for survival, bypassed professional leadership in order to entrust its political fortunes to a man without political experience. In most of the previous instances, the nomination had gone to a military man. In 1940, it went to a businessman." Richard Moe, in his book on the 1940 election, suggested that the nomination of Willkie left long-lasting scars on the Republican Party, with conservatives angered by the success of its Eastern Establishment wing; "whatever else it did, Philadelphia gave birth to the bitter proprietary division within the Republican Party, one accentuated by ideology and geography, that would define the party for decades to come." Among those converted from isolationism by Willkie's oratory, and who worked intensely on the Willkie campaign in Michigan, was future 38th president Gerald R. Ford, who wrote many years later in his memoirs, "I now realize that my participation did not make much difference at all to the political fate of Wendell Willkie. But it made a lot of difference to me."

Correspondent and author Warren Moscow wrote that, after 1940, Willkie helped Roosevelt, who was always careful not to go too far in front of public opinion, "as a pace-setter with the President's blessing". Willkie's global trip and the publication of One World increased public support for the idea that the United States should remain active internationally once the war was won, and should not withdraw into a new isolationism. Indiana University president Herman B Wells noted that One World "has had such a profound influence on the thinking of Americans". Historian Samuel Zipp noted, "He launched the most successful and unprecedented challenge to conventional nationalism in modern American history ... He urged [Americans] to imagine and feel a new form of reciprocity with the world, one that millions of Americans responded to with unprecedented urgency."

His advocacy came at a cost to his standing in the Republican Party. According to Moscow, "his appeal for the party to be the party of the Loyal Opposition, supporting the President, was treason to the diehards; his trip around the world marked him as a Presidential agent seeking to infiltrate the Republican Party". This decline was accelerated as it became apparent that Willkie was a liberal, standing to the left of Roosevelt and proposing even higher taxes than the president was willing to stomach.

The World War II Liberty Ship SS Wendell L. Willkie was named in his honor.

In 1965, Indiana University completed Willkie Quadrangle, an 11-story undergraduate residence hall, on the Bloomington campus that was named after Willkie.

In 1992, the United States Postal Service marked the centennial of Willkie's birth with a 75-cent stamp in the Great Americans series. Dunn concluded that Willkie "died as he had lived, an idealist, a humanitarian—and a lone wolf". Willkie's biographer, Neal, wrote of him,

Though he never became President, he had won something much more important, a lasting place in American history. Along with Henry Clay, William Jennings Bryan, and Hubert Humphrey, he was the also-ran who would be long remembered. "He was a born leader," wrote historian Allan Nevins, "and he stepped to leadership at just the moment when the world needed him." Shortly before his death, Willkie told a friend, "If I could write my own epitaph and if I had to choose between saying, 'Here lies an unimportant President', or, 'Here lies one who contributed to saving freedom at a moment of great peril', I would prefer the latter."

== Works ==
- One World (1943)
- An American Program, Simon and Schuster, 1944 (short essay collection)

== See also ==
- State of the Union, play believed to be based on Willkie's presidential run.

== Notes ==
Explanatory notes

== Bibliography ==
External videos
- After Words interview with Charles Peters on Five Days in Philadelphia, September 3, 2005, C-SPAN
- Presentation by Peters on Five Days in Philadelphia, June 24, 2006, C-SPAN

- Joseph Barnes (1952). Willkie: The Events He Was Part of, the Ideas He Fought For. Simon and Schuster. pp. 321–323.
- Bennett, James D. (Winter 1969). "Roosevelt, Willkie, and the TVA". Tennessee Historical Quarterly. 28 (4): 388–396. JSTOR 42623111.
- Dunn, Susan (2013). 1940: FDR, Willkie, Lindbergh, Hitler – the Election Amid the Storm. New Haven, CT: Yale University Press. ISBN 978-0-300-20574-9.
- Evjen, Henry O. (1952). "The Willkie Campaign: An Unfortunate Chapter in Republican Leadership". The Journal of Politics. 14 (2): 241–256. doi:10.2307/2126521. JSTOR 2126521. S2CID 154802463.
- Goodwin, Doris Kearns (1994). No Ordinary Time: Franklin & Eleanor Roosevelt: The Home Front in World War II. New York: Simon&Schuster. ISBN 0-671-64240-5.
- Jordan, David M. (2011). FDR, Dewey, and the Election of 1944. Bloomington, IN: Indiana University Press. ISBN 978-0-253-00562-5.
- Lewis, David Levering (2018). The Improbable Wendell Willkie: The Businessman Who Saved the Republican Party and His Country, and Conceived a New World Order. Liveright Publishing. ISBN 978-1-63149-374-4.
- Madison, James H., ed. Wendell Willkie: Hoosier Internationalist (Indiana University Press, 1992).
- Moe, Richard (2013). Roosevelt's Second Act. Oxford: Oxford University Press. ISBN 978-0-19-998191-5.
- Moscow, Warren (1968). Roosevelt & Willkie. Englewood Cliffs, NJ: Prentice-Hall, Inc. OCLC 441820.
- Neal, Steve (1984). Dark Horse: A Biography of Wendell Willkie. Garden City, NY: Doubleday. ISBN 0-385-18439-5.
- Peters, Charles (2006). Five Days in Philadelphia: The Amazing "We Want Willkie" Convention of 1940 and How It Freed FDR to Save the Western World. New York: PublicAffairs. ISBN 1-58648-450-8.
- Ross, Hugh (June 1962). "Was the nomination of Wendell Willkie a political miracle?". Indiana Magazine of History. 58 (2): 79–100. JSTOR 27788982.
- Sitkoff, Harvard (2010). Toward Freedom Land: The Long Struggle for Racial Equality in America. University Press of Kentucky. ISBN 978-1-282-93765-9. JSTOR j.ctt2jcgvk.10.(subscription required)
- Snyder, Roland H. (Autumn 2004). "Wisconsin ends the political career of Wendell Willkie". The Wisconsin Magazine of History. 88 (1): 30–41. JSTOR 4637111.
- Stengrim, Laura A. (Summer 2018). "One World: Wendell Willkie's Rhetoric of Globalism in the World War II Era". Rhetoric and Public Affairs. 21 (2): 201–234. doi:10.14321/rhetpublaffa.21.2.0201. JSTOR 10.14321/rhetpublaffa.21.2.0201. S2CID 158269042. Project MUSE 699052.
- Syers, William A. (Winter 1990). "The political beginnings of Gerald R. Ford: Anti-bossism, internationalism, and the congressional campaign of 1948". Presidential Studies Quarterly. 20 (1): 127–142. JSTOR 20700119.
- Zipp, S. (Fall 2014). "When Wendell Willkie Went Visiting: Between Interdependency and Exceptionalism in the Public Feeling for One World". American Literary History. 26 (3): 484–510. doi:10.1093/alh/aju040. S2CID 145809275. Project MUSE 553327.
- Zipp, Samuel (November 2018). "Dilemmas of World-Wide Thinking: Popular Geographies and the Problem of Empire in Wendell Willkie's Search for One World". Modern American History. 1 (3): 295–319. doi:10.1017/mah.2018.30. ProQuest 2210933282.
- Zipp, Samuel (2020). The Idealist: Wendell Willkie's Wartime Quest to Build One World. Harvard University Press. ISBN 978-0-674-73751-8.

Party political offices
Preceded by Alf Landon	Republican nominee for President of the United States; 1940	Succeeded by Thomas E. Dewey
