= Commonwealth & Southern Corporation =

Defunct United States utility company

The Commonwealth & Southern Corporation was a New York City-based United States electric utility holding company. The company was incorporated in 1929, and it initially contained three other electric utility holding companies: the Commonwealth Power Corporation, Southeastern Power & Light Company, and Penn-Ohio Edison Company. The company was led for a time by Wendell Willkie. Parts of Commonwealth & Southern became the forerunners of modern-day Consumers Energy, Southern Company, and Ohio Edison.

== See also ==
- Electric Bond and Share Company
