= Robert A. Hurley =

American politician (1895–1968)

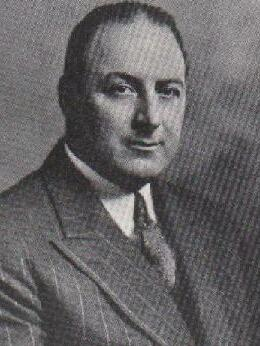

73rd Governor of Connecticut
- In office January 8, 1941 – January 6, 1943
- Lieutenant: Odell Shepard
- Preceded by: Raymond E. Baldwin
- Succeeded by: Raymond E. Baldwin

Personal details
- Born: August 25, 1895 Bridgeport, Connecticut
- Died: May 3, 1968 (aged 72) West Hartford, Connecticut
- Party: Democratic
- Spouse: Evelyn Hedberg Hurley
- Children: 3
- Education: Lehigh University

Military service
- Branch/service: United States Navy
- Rank: Radio Electrician
- Battles/wars: World War I

Robert Augustine Hurley (August 25, 1895 – May 3, 1968) was an American politician and the 73rd governor of Connecticut.

== Biography ==
Hurley, a second generation Irish-American, was born in Bridgeport, Connecticut, on August 25, 1895, to Robert Emmet and Sabina O'Hara Hurley. He attended local public schools and Cheshire Academy. He studied at Lehigh University where he worked his way through school as a hod carrier in support of bricklayers. An accomplished athlete, he was a four-letter man and, as captain of the baseball team, once pitched a no-hit game. His nickname at Lehigh was "Scraps".

== Career ==
In 1917, at the advent of America's involvement in World War I, Hurley enlisted in the U.S. Navy and became a radio electrician for the submarine fleet (the "pig boats") and on the battleship Pennsylvania. After the war, he played professional football and semiprofessional baseball before joining his father's construction firm. On January 22, 1925, he married Evelyn Hedberg, a nurse from Bridgeport. They had three children.

Hurley then founded his own successful construction and engineering firm of Leverty & Hurley in Bridgeport. Wilbur Lucius Cross, Governor of Connecticut at the time, appointed Hurley to the directorship of the Works Progress Administration (WPA). He had distinguished himself as the federal coordinator during the devastating Hartford flood of 1936. Hurley then went on to become Connecticut's first Public Works Commissioner, where he ferreted out corruption in the state Highway Department and successfully supervised a multimillion-dollar public construction program. He held this post from 1937 to 1940, developing a statewide reputation for honesty and integrity. Though never having run for public office, he was drafted by New Deal Democrats to run against popular Republican Governor Raymond E. Baldwin. At a tumultuous Democratic convention at the Taft Hotel in New Haven, Hurley defeated the Old Guard, who had convinced former Governor Cross to enter the race, and won the nomination for governor.

== Governor of Connecticut ==
Hurley, was elected the Governor of Connecticut in 1940. He was Connecticut's first Catholic governor after 300 years of Protestant political dominance. An enthusiastic supporter of President Franklin D. Roosevelt and the New Deal, he successfully set out to reform the state's labor and employment laws and extend electrification to rural areas of the state. However, other elements of his ambitious reform agenda were stymied by a Republican-controlled General Assembly. After the attack on Pearl Harbor, he quickly mobilized the war production effort and forged a labor-management agreement called "Connecticut's Compact for Victory" that achieved a "no strike pledge" from labor for the unknown duration of the war, and gave the governor sole authority to arbitrate labor disputes during the conflict. The compact became a national model. A fierce opponent of discrimination, he developed a national reputation by integrating housing in the Connecticut National Guard. Hurley also named the first Jewish judges to the Connecticut bench. He ran unsuccessfully for re-election. He left office on January 6, 1943. He again ran unsuccessfully for governor again in 1944.

After completing his term, Hurley was active in the Democratic National Committee and was appointed by President Franklin D. Roosevelt to be a member of the Surplus Property Board from 1944 to 1945. He then retired from public life.

== Death and legacy ==
Hurley died on May 3, 1968. He is interred at Fairview Cemetery, West Hartford, Connecticut. Hurley Hall at the University of Connecticut and at Cheshire Academy are named for him.

Party political offices
Preceded by Wilbur Lucius Cross	Democratic nominee for Governor of Connecticut; 1940, 1942, 1944	Succeeded by Charles Wilbert Snow
Political offices
Preceded by Raymond E. Baldwin	Governor of Connecticut; 1941–1943	Succeeded by Raymond E. Baldwin
