= Woodbury, Connecticut =

- Town
- Town of Woodbury
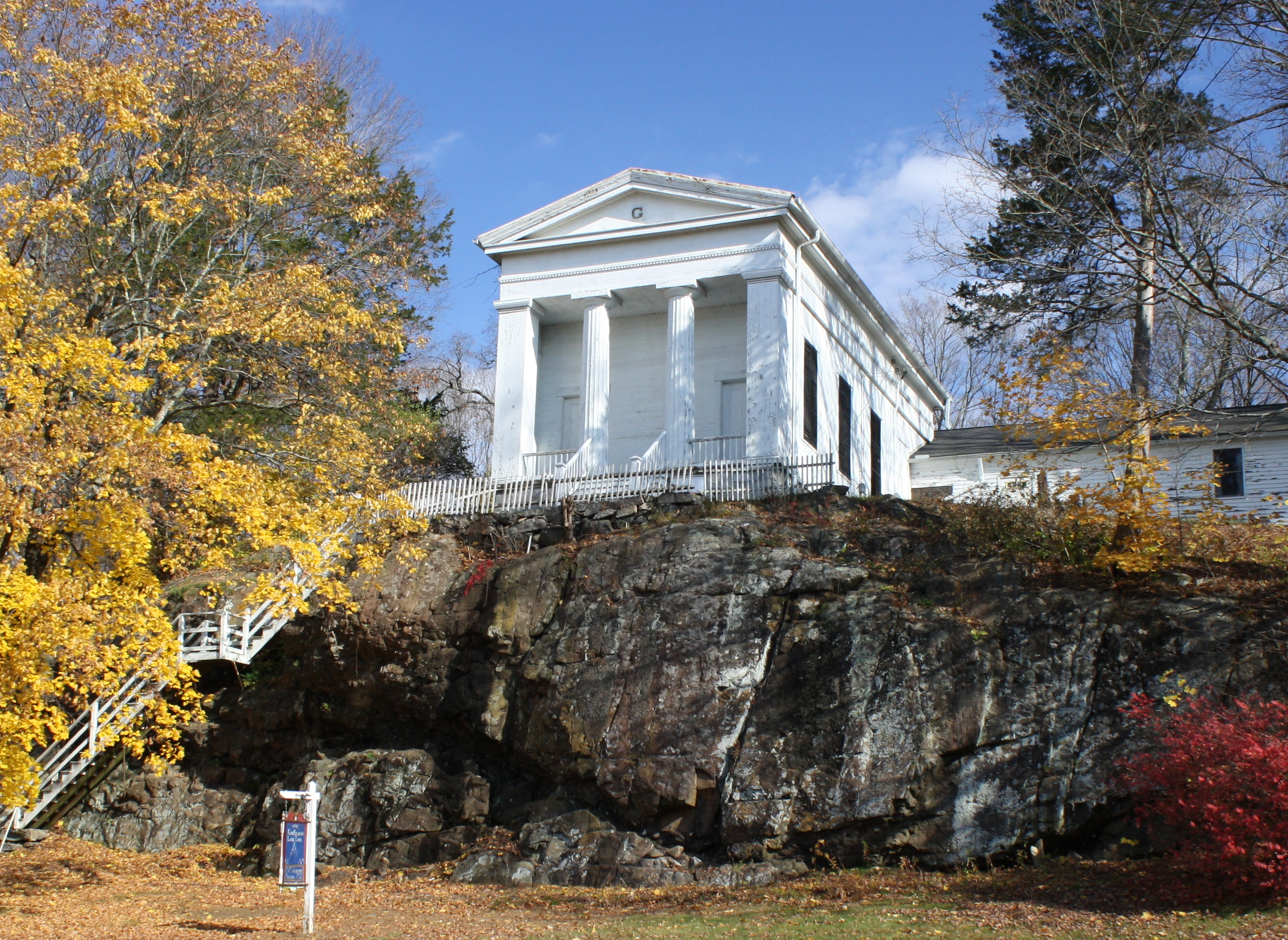
- King Solomon's Lodge No.7, chartered in 1765

- Seal

- Coordinates: 41°33′43″N 73°12′34″W
- Country: United States
- U.S. state: Connecticut
- County: Litchfield
- Region: Naugatuck Valley
- Named: 1673

Government
  - Type: Selectman-town meeting
  - First Selectman: Paul Zulpa (R)
  - Selectman: Richard Coates (D)
  - Selectman: Karen Reddington-Hughes (R)

Area
  - Total: 36.6 sq mi (94.9 km^{2})
  - Land: 36.4 sq mi (94.3 km^{2})
  - Water: 0.23 sq mi (0.6 km^{2})
- Elevation: 243 ft (74 m)

Population (2020)
  - Total: 9,723
  - Density: 267/sq mi (103.1/km^{2})
- Time zone: UTC-5 (Eastern)
  - Summer (DST): UTC-4 (Eastern)
- ZIP code: 06798
- Area codes: 203/475
- FIPS code: 09-87910
- GNIS feature ID: 0213540
- Website: www.woodburyct.org

Woodbury is a town in Litchfield County, Connecticut, United States. The town is part of the Naugatuck Valley Planning Region. The population was 9,723 at the 2020 census. The town center, comprising the adjacent villages of Woodbury and North Woodbury, is designated by the U.S. Census Bureau as the Woodbury Center census-designated place (CDP). Woodbury was founded in 1673.

The center of Woodbury is distinctive for its mile-long stretch of older buildings lining both sides of the road. The public buildings in the National Register Historic District include the First Congregational Church (1818), the Old Town Hall (1846), the United Methodist Church, the St. Paul's Episcopal Church (1785), and the North Congregational Church (1816).

The most eye-catching of the public buildings is the Masonic Temple (1839). It is a modest, clapboard, Greek Revival temple, notable less for its architecture than for its dramatic location, situated atop a high cliff accessed by a long flight of steps (there is a modern road at the rear). It is visible from a distance and is especially dramatic at night, when it is illuminated by spotlights. The Woodbury Temple echoes the many temples of the Greek world that were perched at the edge of high places from which they could be seen from miles around and from far out at sea.

Originally, the many historic houses on the street were residential. In the late twentieth century, they were occupied by a series of antique shops. Woodbury is often referred to as Connecticut's antiques capital.

Woodbury is one of the two towns in Litchfield County, along with Bethlehem, served by the area code 203/area code 475 overlay.

== History ==
The founders of Woodbury came from Stratford, Connecticut, in the early 1670s. Ancient Woodbury consisted of the present towns of Woodbury, Southbury, Roxbury, Bethlehem, most of Washington and parts of Middlebury and Oxford.

Two groups of settlers came from Stratford. The first, religious dissidents unhappy with the church in Stratford, was led by Woodbury's first minister, the Reverend Zachariah Walker. The second, led by Deacon Samuel Sherman, had been given approval by the general court to purchase land from local Native Americans in order to establish a new settlement. Together, fifteen families (about fifty people), arrived in ancient Woodbury, known as "Pomperaug Plantation", early in 1673.

In 1673, these original settlers drew up an agreement called the "Fundamental Articles", which proclaimed that as many settlers as could be accommodated would be welcomed to the new settlement. The Fundamental Articles stated that expenses of establishing the settlement would be shared by its inhabitants, and that no one was to be given more than twenty-five or less than ten acres of land. Other sections of the articles provided for common land and for land saved to be divided up for future inhabitants of the settlement.

The settlement was named Woodbury, which means "dwelling place in the woods", and was first recognized as a town in 1674. Deacon and captain John Minor was the first leader of the community during Woodbury's early years. Minor was the first town clerk and, along with Lieutenant Joseph Judson, served as the first deputy to the Connecticut General Court from the town of Woodbury.

The land for the town was official deeded to the settlers by local Indigenous leaders, notably Nonnewaug, in 1706. Nonnewaug was the last chief of his tribe, and he merely retained the right to hunt and fish on the granted lands.

On October 9, 1751, the town of Woodbury was transferred from Fairfield County at the formation of Litchfield County. On March 25, 1783, a meeting of ten Episcopal clergy in Woodbury elected Samuel Seabury the first American Episcopal bishop, the second presiding bishop of the Episcopal Church in the United States, and the first bishop of Connecticut.

=== The Woodbury Songbook ===
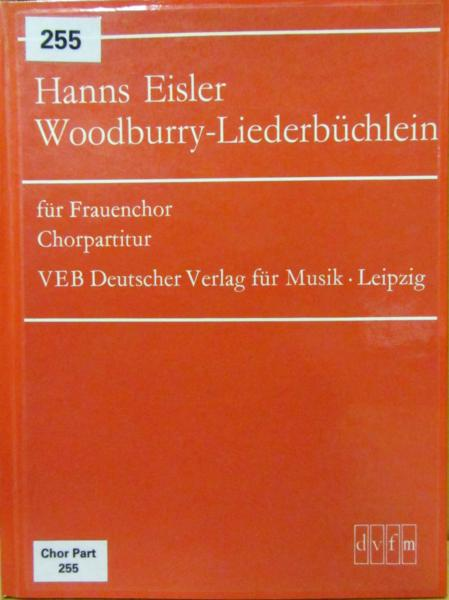
Cover of a library copy of the Woodbury Songbook (which contains a spelling error of Woodbury's name)

The German composer Hanns Eisler, who had taken asylum in the United States after fleeing from the Nazi rule in Germany, spent three and a half months (from June 15 to September 30, 1941) in Woodbury as the guest of another German refugee, Joachim Schumacher, and his wife Sylvia. Joachim taught classes in art history, musicology, philosophy, and other subjects at the Westover School in Middlebury. Sylvia taught piano at Westover School and privately in her home. Joachim enticed Eisler to compose 20 songs on 16 US children's verses or nursery rhymes and four texts in the German language by Goethe, Eduard Mörike and Ignazio Silone. The songs were composed for female voices and suitable for a school chorus. This was published as The Woodbury Songbook, or, in German, Das Woodbury Liederbüchlein with the lyrics in English and German, unfortunately with a wrong spelling of Woodbury (with two "r"s). The German translations are by Wieland Herzfelde.

== Geography ==
Woodbury is in southern Litchfield County and is bordered to the south by New Haven County. It is 10 miles (16 km) west of Waterbury and 21 miles (34 km) northeast of Danbury. According to the United States Census Bureau, the town has a total area of 36.6 square miles (94.9 km^{2}), of which 36.4 square miles (94.3 km^{2}) are land and 0.2 square miles (0.6 km^{2}), or 0.67%, are water. The CDP covering the town center has a total area of 1.9 square miles (5.0 km^{2}), all land.

Woodbury lies in the Pomperaug River valley, a tributary of the Housatonic River. The Pomperaug River is formed in Woodbury by the confluence of the Nonnewaug River and the Weekeepeemee River.

=== Principal communities ===
- Hotchkissville
- Minortown
- Neufa
- North Woodbury
- Pomperaug
- Woodbury Center
- Woodlake

=== Climate ===
Woodbury has a humid continental climate (Köppen climate classification Dfb).

Climate data for Woodbury, Connecticut
Month	Jan	Feb	Mar	Apr	May	Jun	Jul	Aug	Sep	Oct	Nov	Dec	Year
Record high °F (°C)	63 (17)	67 (19)	81 (27)	93 (34)	96 (36)	96 (36)	100 (38)	98 (37)	94 (34)	88 (31)	78 (26)	68 (20)	100 (38)
Mean daily maximum °F (°C)	34 (1)	37 (3)	46 (8)	58 (14)	70 (21)	78 (26)	83 (28)	81 (27)	73 (23)	62 (17)	50 (10)	38 (3)	59 (15)
Mean daily minimum °F (°C)	13 (−11)	14 (−10)	23 (−5)	33 (1)	43 (6)	53 (12)	58 (14)	56 (13)	48 (9)	36 (2)	28 (−2)	19 (−7)	35 (2)
Record low °F (°C)	−22 (−30)	−18 (−28)	−11 (−24)	0 (−18)	22 (−6)	32 (0)	38 (3)	35 (2)	23 (−5)	14 (−10)	5 (−15)	−14 (−26)	−22 (−30)
Average precipitation inches (mm)	4.03 (102)	3.3 (84)	4.57 (116)	4.29 (109)	4.5 (110)	4.2 (110)	4.2 (110)	4.44 (113)	4.63 (118)	4.44 (113)	4.39 (112)	4.17 (106)	51.16 (1,303)
Source: The Weather Channel

== Demographics ==
Historical population
Census	Pop.	Note	%±
1820	1,885		—
1850	2,150		—
1860	2,037		−5.3%
1870	1,931		−5.2%
1880	2,149		11.3%
1890	1,815		−15.5%
1900	1,988		9.5%
1910	1,860		−6.4%
1920	1,698		−8.7%
1930	1,744		2.7%
1940	1,998		14.6%
1950	2,564		28.3%
1960	3,910		52.5%
1970	5,869		50.1%
1980	6,942		18.3%
1990	8,131		17.1%
2000	9,198		13.1%
2010	9,975		8.4%
2020	9,723		−2.5%
U.S. Decennial Census

At the 2010 census there were 9,984 people, 4,219 households, and 2,772 families in the town. The population density was 252.2 inhabitants per square mile (97.4/km^{2}). There were 3,869 housing units at an average density of 106.1 per square mile (41.0/km^{2}). The racial makeup of the town was 97.25% White, 0.53% African American, 0.22% Native American, 1.15% Asian, 0.07% Pacific Islander, 0.22% from other races, and 0.57% from two or more races. Hispanic or Latino of any race were 1.65%.

Of the 3,715 households 31.4% had children under the age of 18 living with them, 58.9% were married couples living together, 8.0% had a female householder with no husband present, and 30.7% were non-families. 25.4% of households were one person and 8.7% were one person aged 65 or older. The average household size was 2.48 and the average family size was 2.99.

The age distribution was 24.0% under the age of 18, 4.4% from 18 to 24, 29.3% from 25 to 44, 29.3% from 45 to 64, and 13.0% 65 or older. The median age was 41 years. For every 100 females, there were 95.3 males. For every 100 females age 18 and over, there were 91.8 males.

The median household income was $68,322 and the median family income was $82,641. Males had a median income of $53,246 versus $35,298 for females. The per capita income for the town was $37,903. About 2.3% of families and 4.5% of the population were below the poverty line, including 4.9% of those under age 18 and 6.3% of those age 65 or over.

=== CDP ===
At the 2000 census, there were 9,198 people, 618 households, and 336 families in the CDP. The population density was 668.8 inhabitants per square mile (258.2/km^{2}). There were 644 housing units at an average density of 331.8 per square mile (128.1/km^{2}). The racial makeup of the CDP was 98.07% White, 0.85% African American, 0.15% Native American, 0.39% Asian, 0.31% from other races, and 0.23% from two or more races. Hispanic or Latino of any race were 1.16% of the population.

Of the 618 households 25.1% had children under the age of 18 living with them, 41.9% were married couples living together, 9.5% had a female householder with no husband present, and 45.5% were non-families. 39.3% of households were one person and 15.7% were one person aged 65 or older. The average household size was 2.10 and the average family size was 2.82.

The age distribution was 20.6% under the age of 18, 5.2% from 18 to 24, 30.2% from 25 to 44, 28.1% from 45 to 64, and 15.9% 65 or older. The median age was 40 years. For every 100 females, there were 85.4 males. For every 100 females age 18 and over, there were 79.1 males.

The median household income was $51,136 and the median family income was $65,227. Males had a median income of $50,625 versus $40,729 for females. The per capita income for the CDP was $30,277. None of the families and 4.6% of the population were living below the poverty line, including no under eighteens and 8.9% of those over 64.

== Arts and culture ==
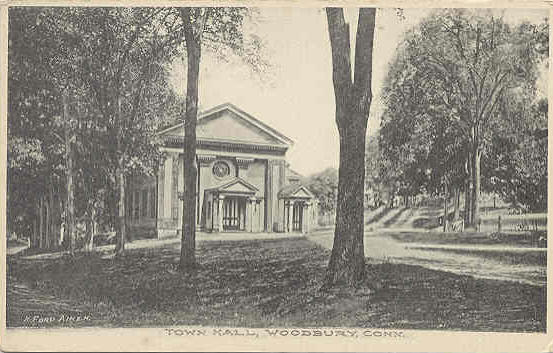
Town Hall, c. 1907

Notable locations include:

- Glebe House
- Jabez Bacon House
- Hotchkissville Historic District, listed on the National Register of Historic Places in 1995
- St. Paul's Episcopal Church
- The Soldiers Monument
- The Hollow Park

== Government ==
Woodbury is currently located in Connecticut's 5th congressional district, and is represented by Democrat Jahana Hayes. The town is part of Connecticut's 32nd State Senate District and is represented by State Sen. Eric Berthel.

Since its founding in 1854, every Republican presidential candidate has carried Woodbury, even in nationwide Democratic landslides such as 1912, 1936, and 1964 in which Democratic candidates won Connecticut. Only four times, in 1884, the aforementioned 1912, 1992, and 1996 has the GOP candidate for president not received an absolute majority of the vote. In the eleven elections from 1920 to 1960, the Republican candidates all broke 70% of the vote in Woodbury, with the party's best showing coming in 1928 when Herbert Hoover received 84.17% of the vote. The best showing for any Democrat in Woodbury since the founding of the GOP occurred in 1964 when Lyndon Johnson received 48.82% of the vote in an election where he won Connecticut with 67.81% of the vote.

Similarly, Woodbury has also supported the last 36 GOP campaigns for governor of Connecticut.

Prior to the GOP's founding, Woodbury supported Whig presidential nominees Winfield Scott, Zachary Taylor, Henry Clay, and John Quincy Adams in 1852, 1848, 1832, and 1828 respectively. Adams of whom has the largest percentage of the vote since 1828 for a presidential candidate in Woodbury at 88.36%. In 1836, 1840, and 1844, Martin Van Buren, and James K. Polk carried Woodbury, they remain the only two Democratic presidential candidates to carry the town, as of the 2020 presidential election.

The results for Woodbury in all presidential elections since 1828, and all gubernatorial elections since 1916 can be found below:

Woodbury town vote by party in presidential elections
Year	Democratic	Republican	Third Parties
2024	47.86% 3,091	50.76% 3,278	1.38% 89
2020	48.50% 3,181	50.24% 3,295	1.26% 83
2016	42.05% 2,466	54.07% 3,171	3.89% 228
2012	43.82% 2,434	55.06% 3,058	1.12% 62
2008	48.00% 2,926	51.12% 3,116	0.89% 54
2004	43.00% 2,519	55.64% 3,260	1.37% 80
2000	41.93% 2,175	52.09% 2,702	5.98% 310
1996	39.54% 1,779	49.19% 2,213	11.27% 507
1992	31.97% 1,574	44.40% 2,186	23.62% 1,163
1988	35.06% 1,510	64.29% 2,769	0.65% 28
1984	27.93% 1,164	71.68% 2,987	0.38% 16
1980	24.23% 937	62.24% 2,407	13.52% 523
1976	32.19% 1,158	67.11% 2,414	0.70% 25
1972	30.52% 984	68.49% 2,208	0.99% 32
1968	30.18% 757	64.83% 1,626	4.98% 125
1964	48.82% 1,058	51.18% 1,109	0.00% 0
1960	24.70% 508	75.30% 1,549	0.00% 0
1956	15.92% 285	84.08% 1,505	0.00% 0
1952	16.22% 258	83.60% 1,330	0.19% 3
1948	17.10% 205	82.74% 992	1.00% 12
1944	22.28% 240	77.72% 837	0.00% 0
1940	20.36% 202	79.64% 790	0.00% 0
1936	26.80% 235	73.20% 642	0.00% 0
1932	23.01% 168	76.97% 562	0.00% 0
1928	15.41% 108	84.17% 590	0.43% 3
1924	19.86% 116	78.08% 456	2.05% 12
1920	23.18% 134	75.61% 437	1.21% 7
1916	34.62% 108	63.78% 199	1.60% 5
1912	26.42% 98	46.36% 172	27.22% 101
1908	17.22% 73	79.72% 338	3.06% 13
1904	22.65% 99	76.43% 334	0.92% 4
1900	23.18% 105	72.63% 329	4.19% 19
1896	20.57% 87	72.10% 305	7.33% 31
1892	37.88% 161	53.41% 227	8.71% 37
1888	39.11% 185	51.80% 245	9.09% 43
1884	39.34% 192	48.98% 239	11.68% 57
1880	42.38% 228	57.62% 310	0.00% 0
1876	42.75% 227	57.25% 304	0.00% 0
1872	38.03% 177	61.97% 241	0.00% 0
1868	44.65% 213	55.35% 264	0.00% 0
1864	43.75% 189	56.25% 243	0.00% 0
1860	17.49% 69	59.49% 235	23.04% 91
1856	41.94% 190	55.85% 253	2.21% 10
1852	45.05% 200	52.25% 232	2.70% 12
1848	46.33% 208	51.45% 231	2.23% 10
1844	52.84% 270	47.16% 241	0.00% 0
1840	55.99% 229	46.01% 180	0.00% 0
1836	53.95% 164	46.05% 140	0.00% 0
1832	43.54% 118	56.46% 153	0.00% 0
1828	11.64% 22	88.36% 167	0.00% 0

Woodbury town vote by party in gubernatorial elections
Year	Democratic	Republican	Third Parties
2022	45.91% 2,321	52.50% 2,654	1.59% 80
2018	39.22% 2,073	57.14% 3,020	3.63% 192
2014	37.67% 1,598	61.41% 2,605	0.92% 39
2010	38.61% 1,727	60.32% 2,698	1.07% 48
2006	26.67% 1,160	72.14% 3,138	1.20% 52
2002	29.50% 1,187	70.50% 2,837	0.00% 0
1998	22.13% 788	76.30% 2,717	1.57% 56
1994	25.53% 982	52.89% 2,034	21.58% 830
1990	12.56% 447	53.18% 1,892	34.26% 1,219
1986	46.19% 1,297	53.81% 1,511	0.00% 0
1982	38.40% 1,228	60.79% 1,944	0.81% 26
1978	42.79% 1,255	57.21% 1,678	0.00% 0
1974	43.31% 1,204	56.69% 1,576	0.00% 0
1970	25.63% 588	74.37% 1,706	0.00% 0
1966	27.34% 509	72.66% 1,353	0.00% 0
1962	25.45% 467	74.55% 1,368	0.00% 0
1958	38.73% 596	61.27% 943	0.00% 0
1954	20.88% 288	78.46% 1,082	0.65% 9
1950	18.75% 237	78.96% 998	2.29% 29
1948	21.58% 260	77.34% 932	1.08% 13
1946	15.06% 134	79.44% 707	5.51% 49
1944	16.03% 172	82.95% 890	1.03% 11
1942	14.59% 103	81.02% 572	4.39% 31
1940	16.55% 166	79.36% 796	4.09% 41
1938	21.41% 179	56.34% 471	22.25% 186
1936	28.88% 255	70.55% 623	0.56% 5
1934	19.79% 149	77.69% 585	0.25% 19
1932	24.31% 186	71.37% 546	4.31% 33
1930	26.31% 141	73.32% 393	0.37% 2
1928	15.98% 112	83.59% 586	0.43% 3
1926	12.24% 48	86.99% 341	0.77% 3
1924	20.42% 118	79.24% 458	0.35% 2
1922	27.75% 144	71.87% 373	0.39% 2
1920	23.10% 134	75.52% 438	1.38% 8
1918	34.46% 92	64.79% 173	0.75% 2
1916	23.10% 134	75.52% 438	1.38% 8

== Education ==
Woodbury is part of the Region 14 School District consisting of Nonnewaug High School, Woodbury Middle School, Bethlehem Elementary School, Mitchell Elementary School, and STAR Preschool Program.

== Media ==
- Waterbury Republican-American, independent daily newspaper
- Voices, a local newspaper serving Southbury, Middlebury, Oxford, Seymour, Naugatuck, Woodbury, Bethlehem, New Preston, Washington, Washington Depot, Roxbury, Bridgewater, Monroe, Sandy Hook and Newtown

== Infrastructure ==
=== Transportation ===
U.S. Route 6 is the main thoroughfare in the town, leading northeast 7 miles (11 km) to Watertown and south 5 miles (8 km) to Southbury. Connecticut Route 64 is a main highway leading east five miles to Middlebury and 10 miles (16 km) to Waterbury. Other highways in the town include Route 47, leading northwest to Washington; Route 61, leading north from the eastern part of town to Bethlehem; Route 132, leading north from the center of Woodbury to Bethlehem; and Route 317, leading west to Roxbury.

== Notable people ==
- Leroy Anderson (1908–1975), composer ("Sleigh Ride" and many other works); lived in Woodbury from 1948 until his death in 1975. His widow Eleanor Anderson (1918–2014) lived in Woodbury from 1948 until her death
- Malcolm Baldrige (1922–1987), 26th United States Secretary of Commerce; lived in Woodbury until his death in 1987
- Joe Beck (1945–2008), jazz guitarist; lived in Woodbury until his death in 2008
- Hayden Carruth (1921–2008), poet and critic; grew up in the town
- Santino Ferrucci, racing driver; born in the town in 1998
- Alexander Hamilton (1847–1928), rector of St. Paul's Episcopal Church
- Matthew Lyon (1749–1822), U.S. Representative from Vermont and Kentucky, lived in Woodbury after emigrating from Ireland
- Kay Sage (1898–1963), surrealist painter; lived in Woodbury from 1940 until her death
- Henry Shelton Sanford (1823–1891), diplomat and the founder of Sanford, Florida; born in Woodbury
- Yves Tanguy (1900–1955), surrealist painter; lived in Woodbury from 1940 until his death
- William Robert Taylor (1820–1909), governor of Wisconsin; born in Woodbury
- Robert Templeton (1929–1991), presidential portraitist and civil rights artist; lived in Woodbury and maintained his studio there from 1965 until his death
- Rob Zombie, musician and movie director; moved to the town in January 2009 with his spouse Sheri Moon and has since sold his house and moved from town.
