= Wilbur Cross =

Wilbur Cross may refer to:

- People:
  - Wilbur Lucius Cross (1862–1948), American critic, academic, and politician
  - Wilbur Cross (author) (1918–2019), American book author
- Connecticut memorials to Wilbur L. Cross:
  - The Wilbur Cross, or Wilbur Cross Parkway, Fairfield and New Haven counties
  - Wilbur Cross, Wilbur Cross High School in New Haven
  - Wilbur Cross Highway, Hartford and Tolland counties
