= Ilya Tolstoy =

Russian writer

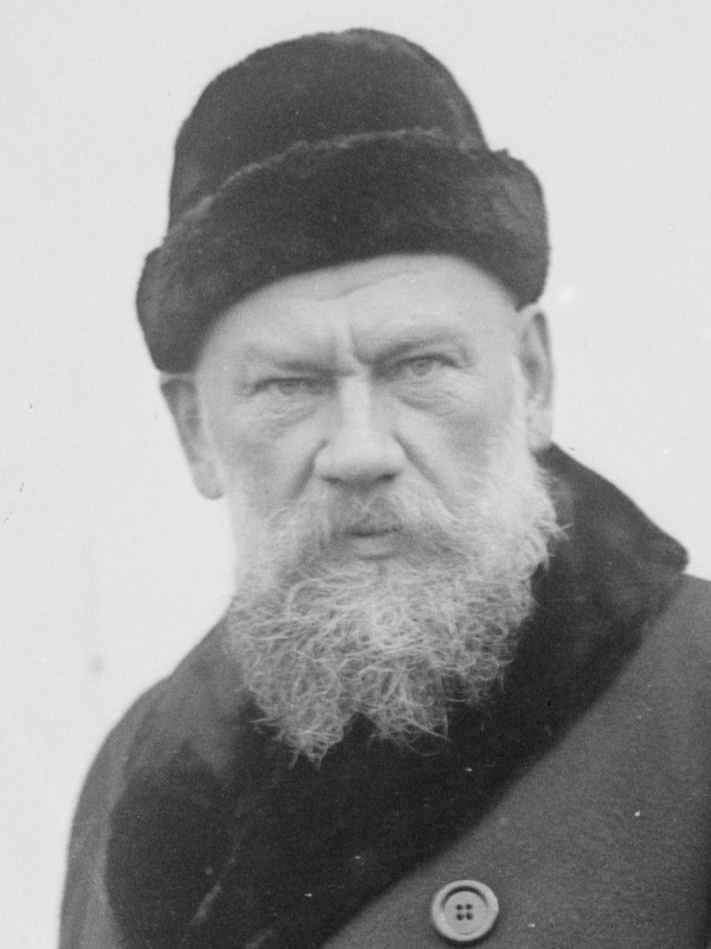
- Ilya Lvovichn Tolstoy in New York City in December 1916
- Born: 22 May 1866; Yasnaya Polyana, Russia
- Died: 11 December 1933 (aged 67); New Haven, Connecticut, United States
- Spouses: Sophia Nikolaevna Filosofova; Nadezhda Klimentievna Katulskaya
- Children: Anna Tolstaya; Nicholas Tolstoy; Micheal Tolstoy; Andrei Tolstoy; Ilya Tolstoy; Vladimir Tolstoy; Vera Tolstaya; Kyril Tolstoy

Count Ilya Lvovich Tolstoy (Russian: Илья́ Льво́вич Толсто́й; 22 May 1866 – 11 December 1933) was a Russian writer, and the third child and second son of Leo Tolstoy. He was the father of Vera Tolstoy and the grandfather of Nikita Tolstoy.

== Early life ==
Ilya was born at Yasnaya Polyana and spent most of his young life there, until the family took a house in Moscow in 1881. He received his early education at home; his mother taught him to read and write, first in Russian, and later in French and English, and his father taught him mathematics, and later Greek and Latin. He and his siblings were also schooled by private tutors.

Leo Tolstoy, in an 1872 letter to his father's cousin Alexandra Andreyevna Tolstaya, described his children; he said the following of his son Ilya:

Ilya, the third, has never been ill in his life; broad-boned, white and pink, radiant, bad at lessons. Is always thinking about what he is told not to think about. Invents his own games. Hot-tempered and violent, wants to fight at once; but is also tender-hearted and very sensitive. Sensuous; fond of eating and lying still doing nothing. When he eats currant-jelly and buck-wheat kasha his lips itch. Independent-minded in everything. When he cries, is vicious and horrid at the same time; when he laughs every one laughs too. Everything forbidden delights him; he recognizes it at once.

In 1881 Ilya entered a private gymnasium to continue his education. His father had originally planned for him to attend a state school, but had refused to sign a declaration of Ilya's loyalty to the Tsar, which was required for entry.

== Career ==
Ilya left school before graduating, and entered military service in the Sumy Dragoons. In 1888 he married Sofia Filosofova. After his time as an officer, he was a bank employee, and later an agent for an insurance company. He assisted his father in relief efforts during the Russian famine of 1891–92. During World War I he worked for the Red Cross. He also tried his hand at journalism. In 1915 he founded the newspaper New Russia.

In 1916, Ilya left Russia, and travelled to the United States, arriving in December; and he traveled across the country lecturing about his father's life and work.

His lecture tour ended in 1917 and he returned to Russia, but left the country when the Bolsheviks came to power later that year. He moved to Paris and then back to the United States, where in September 1920 he married Nadine Perchina, who later became one of the closest disciples of the spiritual teacher Meher Baba. This was the second marriage for both. They moved to Waterbury, Connecticut, and he continued to lecture and write. He pawned some of the family treasures brought from Russia to raise money in 1922. Then, in 1925, along with fellow Russian writer, George Grebenstchikoff, Tolstoy moved to the small Connecticut town of Southbury. They founded a Russian community in the southwest corner of the town. Tolstoy had originally found the area and set up a home earlier in 1923. He loved the way the rolling hills reminded him of the Russian country side. He moved temporarily to California in 1926 to work on a movie version of his father's novel, Resurrection.

He died on 11 December 1933 in New Haven, Connecticut.

He is best known for his book of memoirs about his father Reminiscences of Tolstoy. He also wrote the short novel The Corpse in 1890 (published posthumously), and the story One Bastard Less which was published in the journal Russian Thought in 1905.

== English translations ==
- Reminiscences of Tolstoy, Chapman & Hall, London, 1914 (at the Internet Archive).
- Reminiscences of Tolstoy, Century Company, NY, 1914 (on Google Books).
- Tolstoy, My Father; Reminiscences, Cowles Book Company, Chicago, 1971. (at the Internet Archive).
