= Pete Maki =

American baseball player and coach (born 1982)

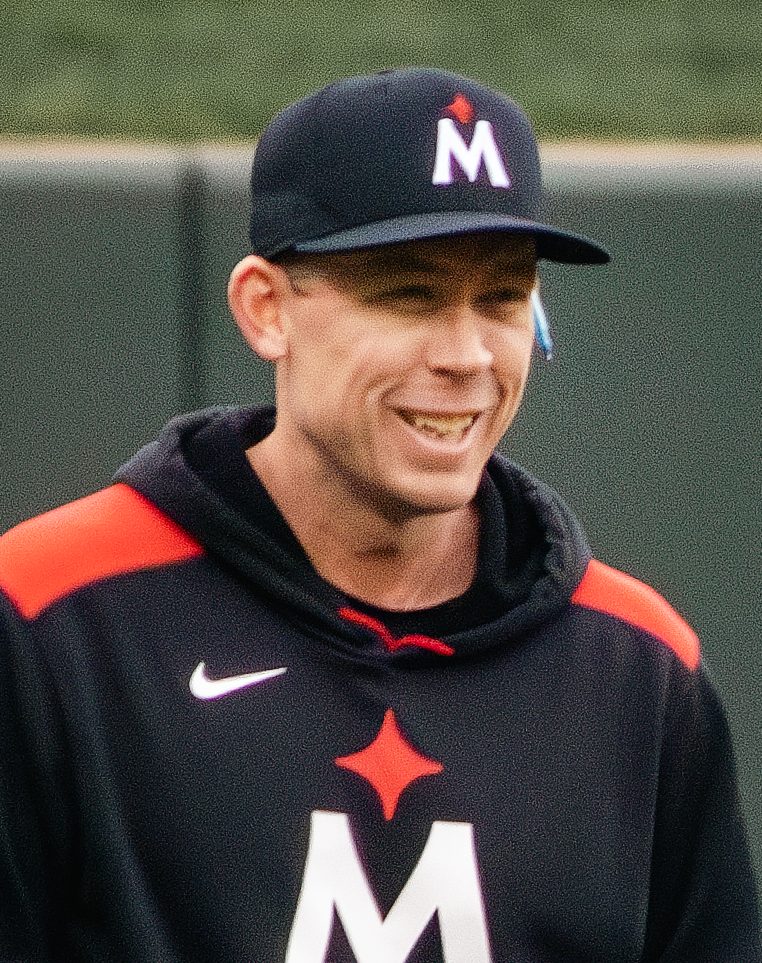
- Maki with the Minnesota Twins

Minnesota Twins – No. 88
- Pitching coach
- Born: July 29, 1982 (age 44); Lufkin, Texas, U.S.
- Bats: Left Throws: Left

Teams
- As coach: Minnesota Twins (2021–present)

Peter Maki (born July 29, 1982) is an American professional baseball coach who is the pitching coach for the Minnesota Twins of Major League Baseball.

== Early life and playing career ==
Maki graduated from Nonnewaug High School in Woodbury, Connecticut. He enrolled at Franklin & Marshall College, where he played college baseball as a relief pitcher. He graduated in 2004.

== Coaching career ==
Maki with pitcher Joe Ryan and catcher Christian Vázquez.

Maki served as the pitching coach for the New Haven Chargers for two years, then coached for the Columbia Lions from 2008 to 2015, and became an assistant coach for the Duke Blue Devils in 2015.

Maki joined the Minnesota Twins organization as their minor league pitching coordinator after the 2017 season. The Twins promoted him to their major league coaching staff for the 2021 season. On June 27, 2022, Twins pitching coach Wes Johnson announced his departure from the team. The Twins announced that Maki will "play a major role" in fulfilling the pitching coach duties. On July 1, 2022, the Twins announced that Maki would be the full-time pitching coach for the remainder of the season.

== Personal life ==
Maki and his wife have three children.
