= Nonnewaug =

18th-century Native American leader from Connecticut

Nonnewaug (also Nunnewake or Nunawauk) (fl. 1700) was a sagamore, or chief, of a Pootatuck tribe of Indigenous Americans that lived near present-day Woodbury, Connecticut. Nonnewaug sold land his land to white settlers who formed the town of Woodbury. His name is eponymized by the Nonnewaug River, Nonnewaug Falls, and Nonnewaug High School.

== Biography ==
In the 1687 Quassapaug Purchase, European settlers purchased lands encompassing parts of Woodbury, Middlebury, and Southbury, from eight Native leaders, including Nunawuak.

Nonnewaug was last chief of the clan of his name. In 1700, he conveyed to colonial settlers in Connecticut the territory called Nonnewaug, which had belonged to his people. The sale was confirmed in a deed signed in 1706. The deed says the sale was made "for valid considerations moving thereto, besides the desire of a friendly correspondency with ye English inhabitants of Woodbury and was signed by eight Sagamors and the Sachem Nunnewake in behalf of himself and all Pootatuck Indians." Conservationist Alain C. White wrote that "in some of the Woodbury deeds, Nonnewaug's mark is quite plainly a snowshoe."

Though on friendly terms with his white neighbors, he had previously resisted all advances towards the purchase of his lands. He yielded, having negotiated the right to fish and hunt over all of the granted lands. It was written that his "haughty spirit seems to have become humbled, and his ambition after any worthy object have been lost."

Nonnewaug enjoyed indulging in alcohol. In one notable instance, he ran afoul with the colonial law, having become "overtaken in fault" while intoxicated with alcohol. He was taken to court, however, Nonnewaug's wit was lauded by the magistrate and he was acquitted of any crime. He was simply asked to "sin no more".

Nonnewaug moved farther westward from his beloved trout streams and the waterfall where he was wont to meditate; the tribe's methods of trapping were interfered with after the population of the area grew and they became gradually poorer. Legend has it that Nonnewaug died by his own hand, distraut at seeing the civilization of white men appropriating his lands. It is said that he jumped to his death over the waterfall where his people lived.

== Gravesite ==
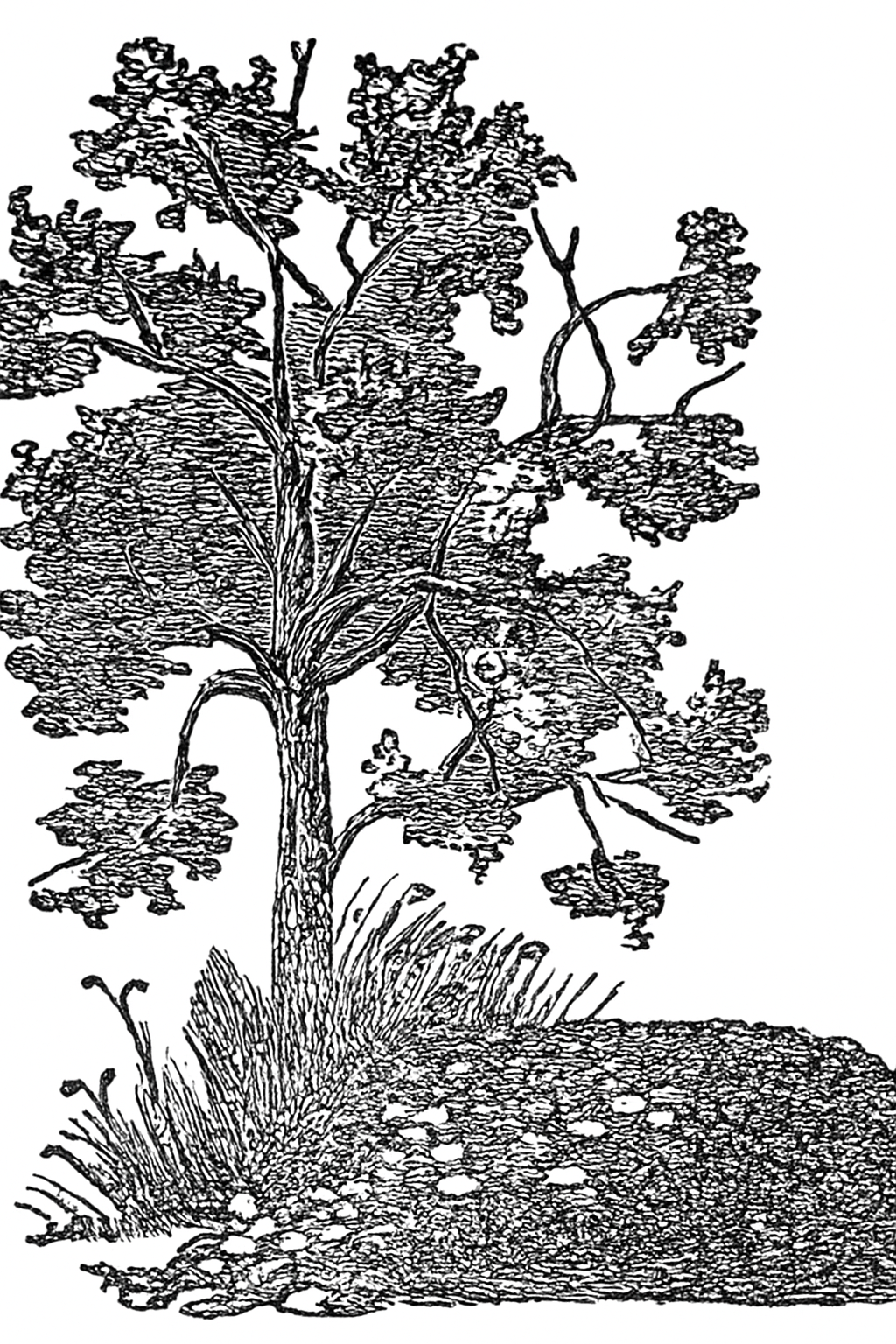
Nonnewaug's grave depicted by William Cothran in his History of ancient Woodbury, Connecticut (1872)

Nonnewaug's ashes were buried at the waterfall which now bears his name. In this location, his fathers' people had been buried before him, true to their instinct of selecting the most beautiful places for their final resting place. An appletree was planted at the head of his grave, which as of 1872, was still standing and in good health.

Until the mid-19th century, Nonnewaug's burial site had a large hillock or mound raised over the grave as was the custom of his people. To honor their dead chiefs, when his people would pass by the burial site, they would cast thereon small stones, selected for that purpose, in token of his respect and remembrance. Its size distinguished the sachem's grave from the other graves around him. However, the owner of the land plowed it down, saying he was not going to have such an old "hummock in his field," The mound thus destroyed was some ten feet long, six feet wide, and four feet high, having been gradually formed. It was similar to the grave of Pomperaug, also found in Woodbury.

== Legacy ==
To the north of Woodbury is Nonnewaug Falls. These falls derive their name from Chief Nonnewaug who was buried nearby and whose memory has been honored by a bronze tablet erected by a lodge of the Fraternal Order of Red Men.

Nonnewaug is also memorialized in the name of the Nonnewaug River and Nonnewaug High School in Woodbury. The school changed its name to honor the chief in the 1970s. Stephen Paluskas, a member of the regional Board of Education, stated that "we thought it would reflect very well to name the school after a real chief in the area like we name schools after presidents." The school's logo depicted the head of Nonnewaug. In 2000, the logo was redesigned due to perceived cultural insensitivity. However, the school continued to compete as the Chiefs.

== See also ==
- Native American mascot controversy
