= Ernest E. Rogers =

American politician

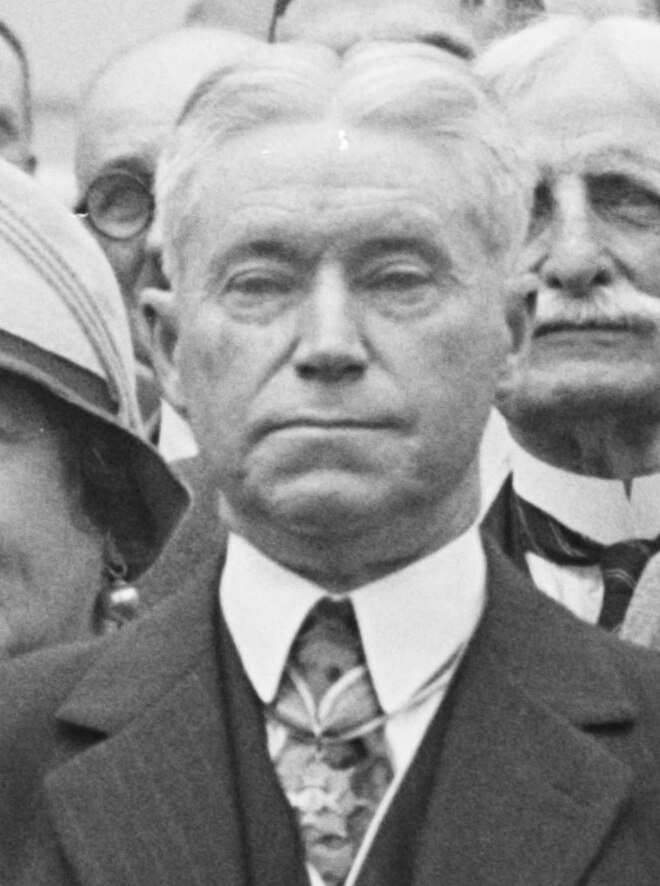
Rogers at the White House in 1928.

Ernest Elias Rogers (December 6, 1866 – January 28, 1945) was an American politician who was the 81st lieutenant governor of Connecticut from 1929 to 1931.

Along with Rogers' political pursuits, he was a member of the Sons of the American Revolution, serving as the organization's President General from 1927 until 1928 Rogers died of a heart attack during Sunday church service in 1945, aged 78. He was also a mayor of New London, Connecticut.

Party political offices
Preceded by John H. Trumbull	Republican nominee for Governor of Connecticut; 1930	Succeeded by John H. Trumbull
Political offices
Preceded by Anson T. McCook	Connecticut State Treasurer; 1925–1929	Succeeded by Samuel R. Spencer
Preceded by J. Edwin Brainard	Lieutenant Governor of Connecticut; 1929-1931	Succeeded by Samuel R. Spencer
