= 1930 Connecticut gubernatorial election =

- November 4, 1930
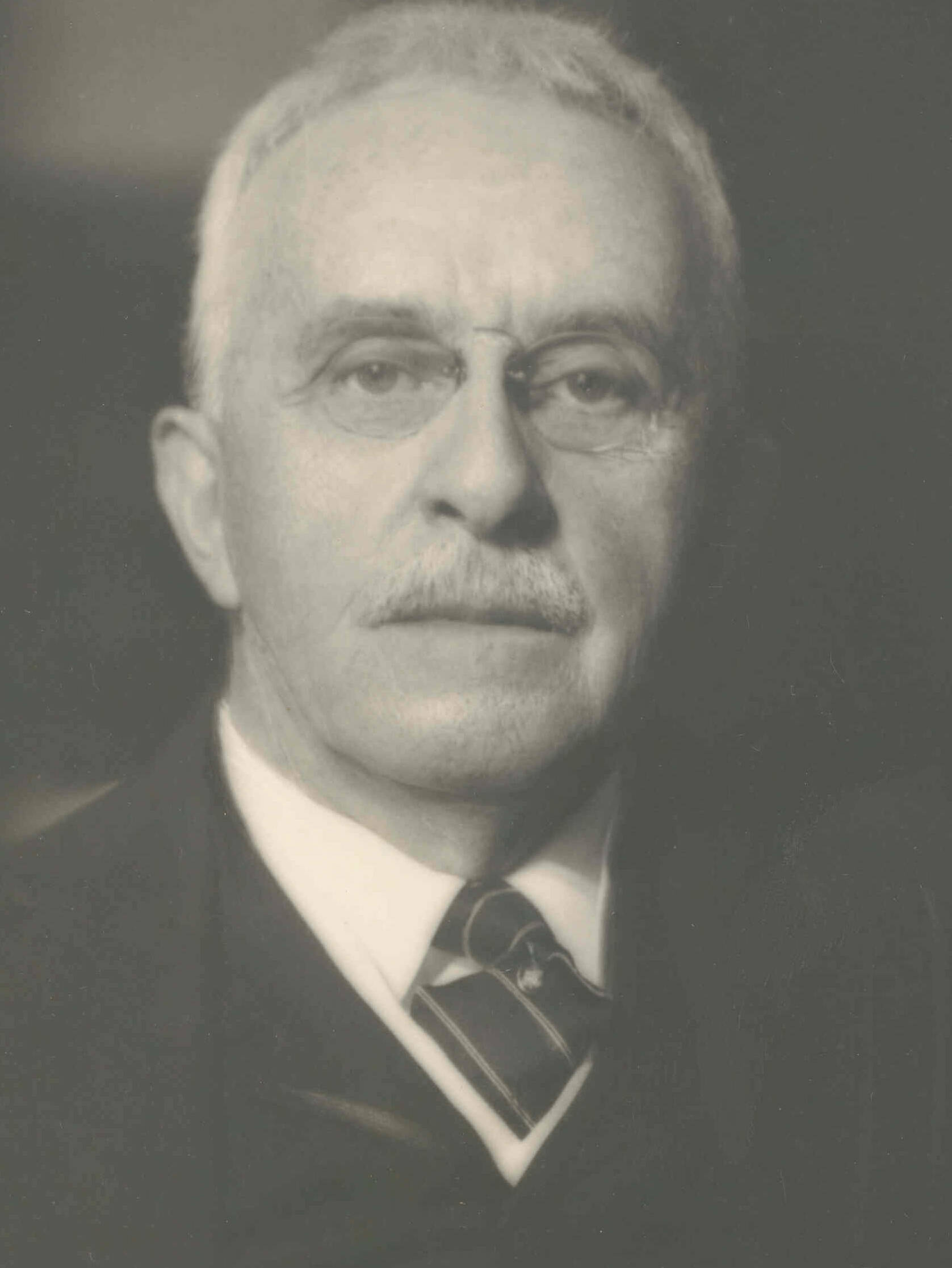

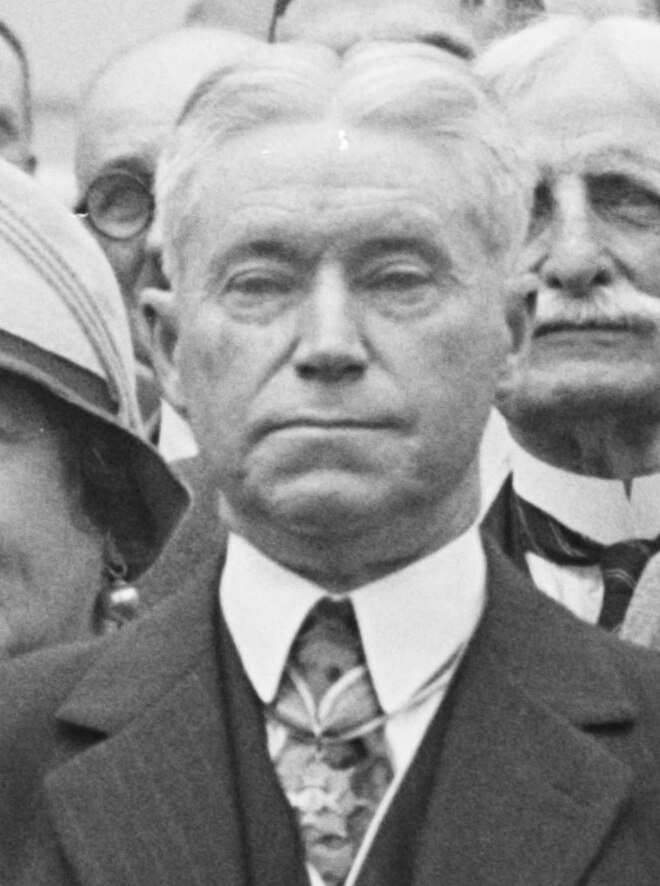
Nominee	Wilbur Lucius Cross	Ernest E. Rogers
Party	Democratic	Republican
Popular vote	215,072	209,607
Percentage	49.91%	48.64%
- Cross: 40–50% 50–60% 60–70% Rogers: 50–60% 60–70% 70–80% 80–90% No Vote/Data
Governor before election
John H. Trumbull
Republican
Elected Governor
Wilbur Lucius Cross
Democratic

The 1930 Connecticut gubernatorial election was held on November 4, 1930. Democratic nominee Wilbur Lucius Cross defeated Republican nominee Ernest E. Rogers with 49.91% of the vote.

== General election ==
=== Candidates ===
Major party candidates

- Wilbur Lucius Cross, Democratic
- Ernest E. Rogers, Republican

Other candidates

- Jasper McLevy, Socialist
- Robert S. Kling, Communist

=== Results ===
1930 Connecticut gubernatorial election
Party	Candidate	Votes	%	±%
Democratic	Wilbur Lucius Cross	215,072	49.91%	
Republican	Ernest E. Rogers	209,607	48.64%	
Socialist	Jasper McLevy	4,700	1.09%	
Communist	Robert S. Kling	1,523	0.35%	
Majority		5,465		
Turnout				
Democratic gain from Republican		Swing		
