= Russian Village Historic District =

Historic district in Connecticut, United States

- U.S. National Register of Historic Places
- U.S. Historic district
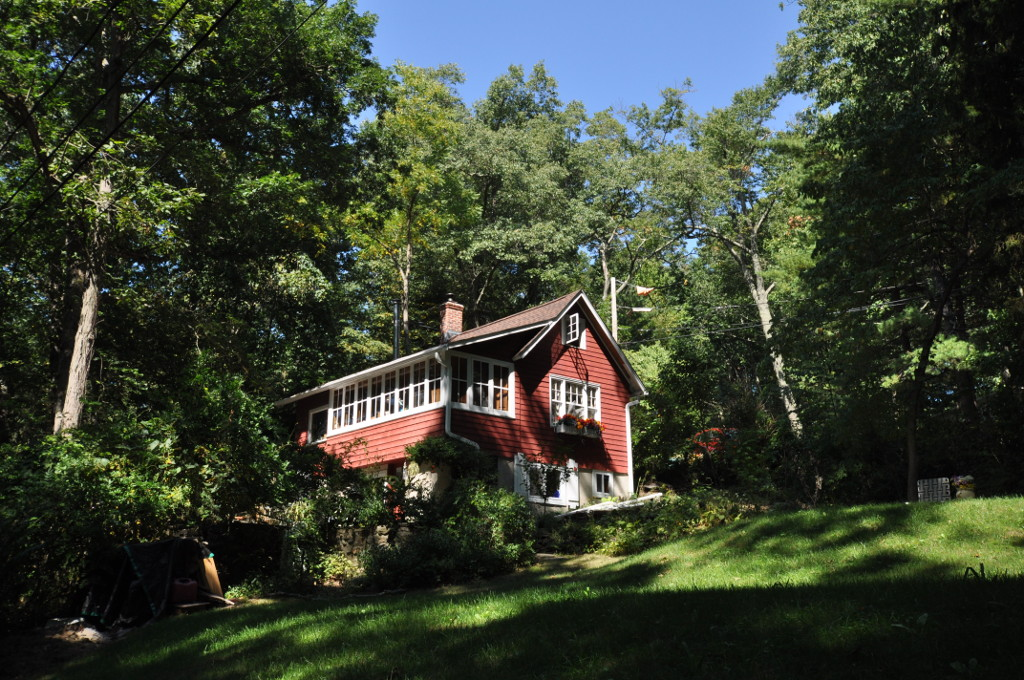

- Location within Connecticut Location within the United States
- Location: Roughly Kiev Drive and Russian Village Road between US 6 and the Pomperaug River, Southbury, Connecticut
- Coordinates: 41°26′56″N 73°15′10″W
- Area: 110 acres (45 ha)
- Built: 1930
- Architect: Grebenstchikoff, George; Et al.
- Architectural style: Late 19th And 20th Century Revivals
- NRHP reference No.: 88002687
- Added to NRHP: December 8, 1988

The Russian Village Historic District, also known as Churaevka (Russian: Чураевка), is a historic summer colony founded by George Grebenstchikoff and Ilya Tolstoy in Southbury, Connecticut. The colony was founded in the 1920s by Russian emigres, and retains distinctive Russian touches in the architecture of its houses, as well as a small chapel designed by Nicholas Roerich. The colony was listed on the National Register of Historic Places in 1988.

== Description and history ==
The area now known as Churaevka or Russian Village in southern Southbury first came to the attention of the Russian emigre Ilya Tolstoy, son of novelist Leo Tolstoy, in the 1920s, when he visited a translator for one of his books. Drawn to the area, whose rolling hills resembled those of his Russian birthplace, he bought some land and built a small dacha (which still stands). The idea of an artistic summer colony was developed by Tolstoy's friend and writer George Grebenstchikoff, who purchased some of Tolstoy's land and other adjacent parcels. He promoted the area to other Russian emigres, ultimately attracting some well-known residents and visitors. Prominent visitors included pianist and composer Sergei Rachmaninoff and industrialist Igor Sikorsky.

The historic district covers about 110 acres (45 ha) of hilly wooded terrain, which slopes down to the Pomperaug River to the west and Interstate 84 to the south. There are 46 buildings on three roads branching off the west end of Russian Village Road. Most of these are single-story wood-frame cottages that are generally vernacular in style, except for distinctive Russian touches applied to elements such as entry hoods and dormers. The most architecturally distinguished building is the small St. Sergius Chapel, built in 1930 to a design by Nicholas Roerich. Undeveloped strips of land, part of the original platting, provide access for various landowners to the river, which was used for recreation and water supply.

== See also ==
- National Register of Historic Places listings in New Haven County, Connecticut
