= Nonnewaug High School =

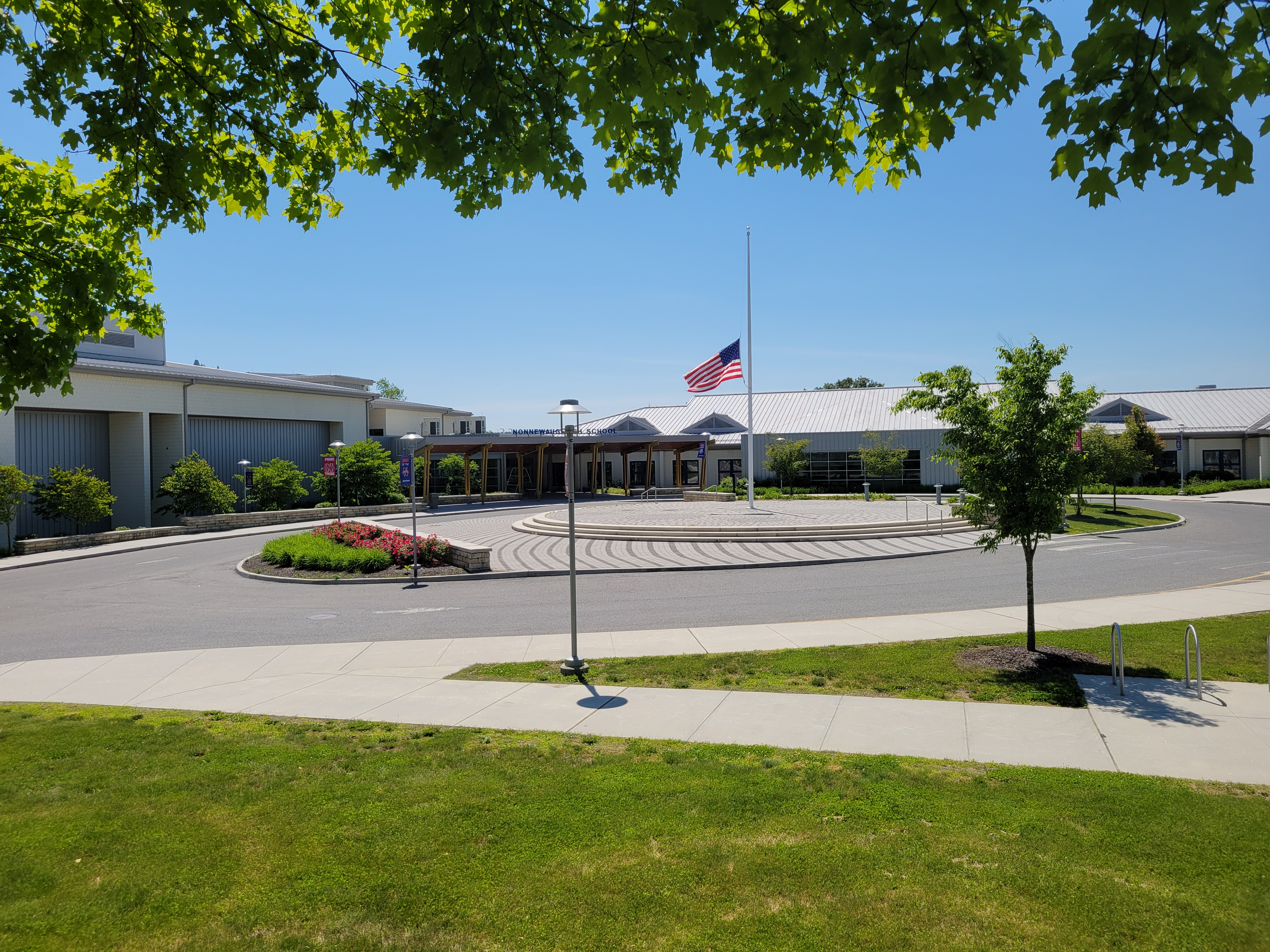
- Nonnewaug High School

Location
- 5 Minortown Road; Woodbury, Connecticut 06798; United States
- Coordinates: 41°33′30″N 73°11′23″W

Information
- Type: Public
- Established: 1970 (56 years ago)
- CEEB code: 070970
- Principal: Mykal Kuslis
- Teaching staff: 62.10 (FTE)
- Enrollment: 652 (2023–2024)
- Student to teacher ratio: 10.50
- Colors: Red, White, and Blue
- Athletics conference: Berkshire League
- Mascot: Chief
- Website: nhs.ctreg14.org

Nonnewaug High School is a public school in Woodbury, Connecticut, United States, which serves the towns of Woodbury and Bethlehem, Connecticut. It is part of Regional School District #14. Before 1970, students in the district attended Woodbury High School, which has now become the middle school. The school houses the Ellis Clark Regional Agri-Science and Technology Center; which is part of the National FFA, which draws students from additional surrounding areas. These towns include Ansonia, Bethlehem, Derby, Middlebury, Naugatuck, Oxford, Prospect, Seymour, Southbury, and Watertown. The Woodbury FFA program is Nationally and State recognized for their achievements. Nonnewaug serves approximately 750 students, around a third of which are from the agriscience program.

== Name and logo ==
The name "Nonnewaug" comes from a local Chief Nonnewaug, and the school competes as the Chiefs. The name was changed from Woodbury High School to honor Nonnewaug in the 1970s. In 2000, the school ceased using a logo which depicted the head of chief Nonnewaug.

== Clubs and Activities ==
There are many clubs at Nonnewaug High. One notable club is the high school's Envirothon team. In 2023 the school's team won the state competition and traveled to Canada for the national competition. In Canada, they place in the top 20%. There is also an outstanding Drama program. They have won Halo awards in acting, costumes, and special effects.

== Television station ==
Nonnewaug High School also contains the local television station NEAT TV available on Channel 194 for Spectrum customers in Woodbury and Bethlehem, Connecticut. This television station airs material created by students throughout the district, as well as live television events such as basketball games and Board of Education meetings.

== Athletics ==
Wins in CIAC State Championships
Sport	Class	Year(s)
Baseball	M	2023
Cheer	M	2005, 2008
Cross country (boys)	SS	1997, 1999
Cross country (boys)	S	1958, 1960
Cross country (girls)	M	2001, 2002, 2010, 2017
Field hockey	S	1990
Soccer (boys)	M	2002
Tennis (boys)	S	1997 (Co-champions with Old Lyme)
Track and field (indoor, boys)	S	1960
Track and field (indoor, girls)	M	2010 (Co-champions with Weaver)
Track and field (outdoor, boys)	S	1959, 1960
Track and field (outdoor, girls)	M	1997, 1998, 2003
Wrestling	S	1991, 1992, 1996, 1997, 2004

== Notable alumni ==
- Jess Davis, pentathlete
- Pete Maki, professional baseball coach
