= Vera Tolstoy =

Russian-American broadcaster and granddaughter of Leo Tolstoy

- Born: Vera Ilyinichna Tolstaya; 1903; Dubrovska, Russian Empire
- Died: March 29, 1999 (aged 95–96); New Smyrna Beach, Florida, United States
- Occupations: Broadcaster, singer
- Known for: Granddaughter of Leo Tolstoy, broadcaster for Voice of America
- Children: 1

Vera Tolstoy (in full Vera Ilyinichna Tolstaya; Вера Ильинична Толста́я; 1903 – March 29, 1999) was a Russian-American broadcaster, grandchild of the novelist Leo Tolstoy and the last family member to have a direct connection with him. She lived much of her life in exile following the Russian Revolution.

== Early life ==
Tolstoy was born in Dubrovska, Russia, the daughter of Ilya Tolstoy and Sophia Tolstaya. She spent part of her childhood visiting her grandfather Leo Tolstoy at Yasnaya Polyana, recalling sitting on his knee and hearing him tell stories. After his death in 1910 and the upheavals of the Russian Revolution, Tolstoy and her mother fled the country as part of the wider diaspora of White Russian émigrés. They eventually settled in Czechoslovakia.

== Career and exile ==
In Czechoslovakia, Tolstoy worked as a translator and married fellow émigré Vladimir (Odo) Bakovsky, with whom she had a son, Sergei, in 1922. The marriage was later annulled or dissolved. Tolstoy supported her family as a hairdresser in Prague and later as a nightclub singer in Paris. During World War II she performed for Allied troops in Germany and the Netherlands.

After immigrating to the United States in 1949, sponsored by her aunt Alexandra Tolstaya, she sold perfume in New York City before joining the Voice of America in Washington, D.C., where Tolstoy worked on Russian-language broadcasts for two decades.

== Later life and death ==
In 1991, she revisited Russia for a family reunion at Yasnaya Polyana, now a museum, expressing disapproval of a Lenin statue at the estate. Tolstoy spent her retirement in Florida, where she was active in the local community. She died on 29 March 1999 in Florida at the age of 95, following complications from injuries sustained in a car accident the previous year.
