= South Britain Historic District =

Historic district in Connecticut, United States

- U.S. National Register of Historic Places
- U.S. Historic district
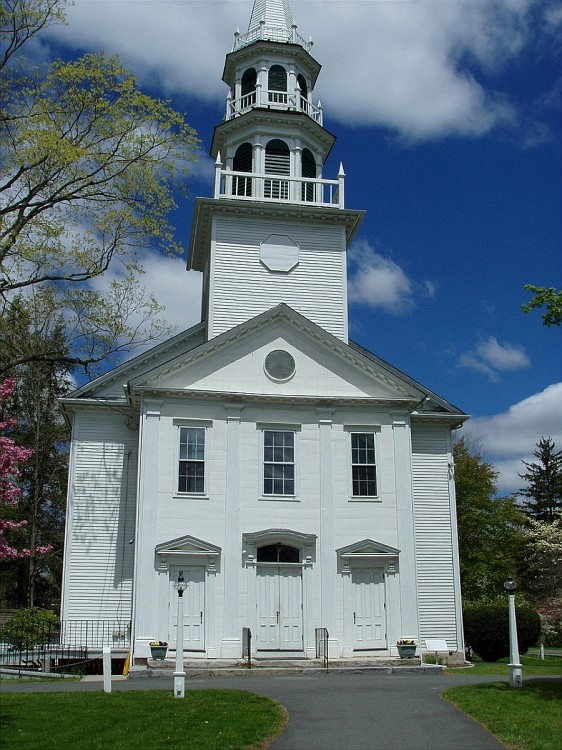
- The Congregational church

- Location within Connecticut Location within the United States
- Location: East Flat Hill, Hawkins, Library, and Middle Roads, and 497-864 South Britain Road CT 172 Southbury, Connecticut
- Coordinates: 41°28′9″N 73°15′3″W
- Area: 70 acres (28 ha)
- Architect: Clark, Zephania; Monumental Bronze Co.
- Architectural style: Greek Revival, Federal, Colonial
- NRHP reference No.: 87000125
- Added to NRHP: February 12, 1987

The South Britain Historic District encompasses the core of the unincorporated village of South Britain in Southbury, Connecticut, United States. The village arose in the 18th century as an industrial center serving the surrounding agricultural community, powered by the Pomperaug River, and rivalled the town center of Southbury in importance. The district was listed on the National Register of Historic Places in 1987.

== Description and history ==
South Britain is located near the geographic center of Southbury, extending North along CT 172 (South Britain Avenue) North of its crossing of the Pomperaug River. Near the river crossing, a dam spans the river, at a site that has been dammed since the 18th century. Foundational remnants of mill buildings line both sides of the river in this area, and a 19th-century power canal extends from the river, where it supplied power to further mill complexes. The village center, now a cluster of commercial, civic, and residential buildings, reaches its northern extent at the cemetery North of East Flat Hill Road. At the Junction with Flat Hill Road stand two 19th-century churches, the Federal-style South Britain Congregational Church (1825) and the now unoccupied Greek Revival Methodist Church (1832).

The early industries of South Britain included fulling, grist, and lumber mills, which served the surrounding area. In the 19th century a wider variety of water-powered industries developed, including textile manufacture. Because of its economic importance, it shared civic duties with the town center, and was granted construction of the Italianate town hall (1873, still standing). That period marked the height of the area's economic influence, as the mills gradually declined. The town hall remained the seat of local government until 1964.

== Contributing properties ==
- B.C. Bradley House, 497 South Britain Road, from 1802 or earlier by assessor records, with cottage and shed of similar age
- H. Curtis House, 584-586 South Britain Road, of Colonial era, probably the oldest house in the district.
- Miss H. E. and S. E. Canfield House, 524 South Britain Road, a Georgian style twin-chimney central-hall house "with Adamesque detail in its portico and cornice" from 1802 or earlier (see accompanying photo 2)
- George Smith House, 605 South Britain Road, a Greek Revival house, c. 1835, with cabin and garage from mid 1900s
- Benjamin Downs House, 657 South Britain Road, a brick Greek Revival with marble dressing, from 1770 by assessor records
- Mrs. B. Chatfield House, 24 Hawkins Road, a brick Greek Revival, from 1850 (see photo 12)
- Congregational Church, 683 South Britain Road, from 1825. Federal style with later Gothic window. (See photo 15)
- Methodist Church, "an austere example of the Greek Revival style", from 1832, in deteriorated condition in 1986. (See photos 15 and 18)
- Town Hall, built in 1873 (see photo 10)
- Mitchell Double House, at 545-547 South Britain Road, built in 1752. It has (probably later) Federal-style elements, including the entryway. The house was built by Zephania Clark and was home to M. M. Canfield and C. Muirhill. A later owner, Deacon Mitchell, left the house to his two sons. There was once a grist mill on the property, built c. 1796.

Also included in the district is a steel-span bridge from 1939.

== See also ==
- National Register of Historic Places listings in New Haven County, Connecticut
