= Hotchkissville Historic District =

Historic district in Connecticut, United States

- U.S. National Register of Historic Places
- U.S. Historic district
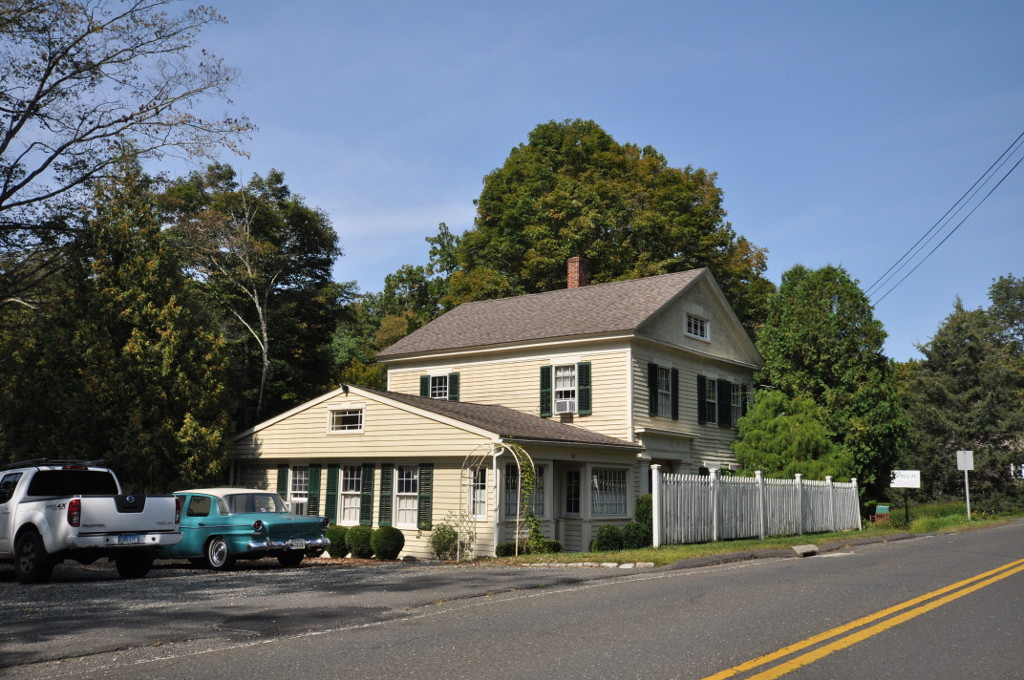

- Location within Connecticut Location within the United States
- Location: Roughly bounded by West Wood, Paper Mill, Weekeepeemee, Washington, and Jack's Bridge Roads Woodbury, Connecticut
- Coordinates: 41°33′46″N 73°13′8″W
- Area: 320 acres (130 ha)
- Architectural style: Federal, Colonial, Greek Revival
- NRHP reference No.: 96001460
- Added to NRHP: December 6, 1996

The Hotchkissville Historic District is a historic district in the town of Woodbury, Connecticut, United States that was listed on the National Register of Historic Places in 1995. The district encompasses most of the historic village of Hotchkissville, which is centered at the junction of Washington and Weekeepeemee roads. The village began as a dispersed rural agricultural community, but developed in the 19th century with the arrival of industry, primarily the manufacture of textiles. Despite this, the village has retained a significantly rural character, and includes a broad cross-section of 18th- and 19th-century architectural styles.

== Description and history ==
The town of Woodbury was established in the late 17th century. The Hotchkissville area was initially agricultural, and significant development did not begin until the Washington Turnpike, now Washington Road, opened in 1803. Early industrial activity on the Weekeepeemee River consisted of sawmills and gristmills, some operated by owners whose houses still stand in the district. Josiah Hotchkiss converted one of these sawmills into a textile mill in 1814. The Hotchkiss manufacturing enterprise grew through the first half of the 19th century, building worker house and a mill office, and expanding by the acquisition of other water privileges on the river. Their empire collapsed in the Panic of 1857. The mill properties were taken over by the Dawson family, and other industrial operations began in the second half of the 19th century. Businesses in the area were ultimately harmed and failed by the lack of adequate railroad connections.

The historic district is essentially linear in shape, extending along both sides of the Weekeepeemee River, with Washington Road (Route 47) the main route on the east side, and Westwood Road on the west side. It is bounded in the south by Jack's Bridge Road, and the north by Paper Mill Road and an end to dense development on Weekeepeemee Road. Only remnants of the village's industrial past survive, its major mill complex having burned in 1920. Most of the buildings in the district are of either Federal or Greek Revival style, or have relatively modest later Victorian stylistic elements.

Significant contributing buildings include:

- Josiah Hotchkiss House, 21 Weekeepeemee Road, Colonial/Saltbox, 1760
- Bela Potter House, 2 Easy Street, Italianate, 1847
- John Ways House, 6 Easy Street, Italianate, 1847
- Chester Knowles House, 10 Easy Street, Italianate, 1847
- Eli S. Peet House, 152 Washington Road, Greek Revival, c.1835

== See also ==
- National Register of Historic Places listings in Litchfield County, Connecticut
