= 1928 Connecticut gubernatorial election =

- November 6, 1928
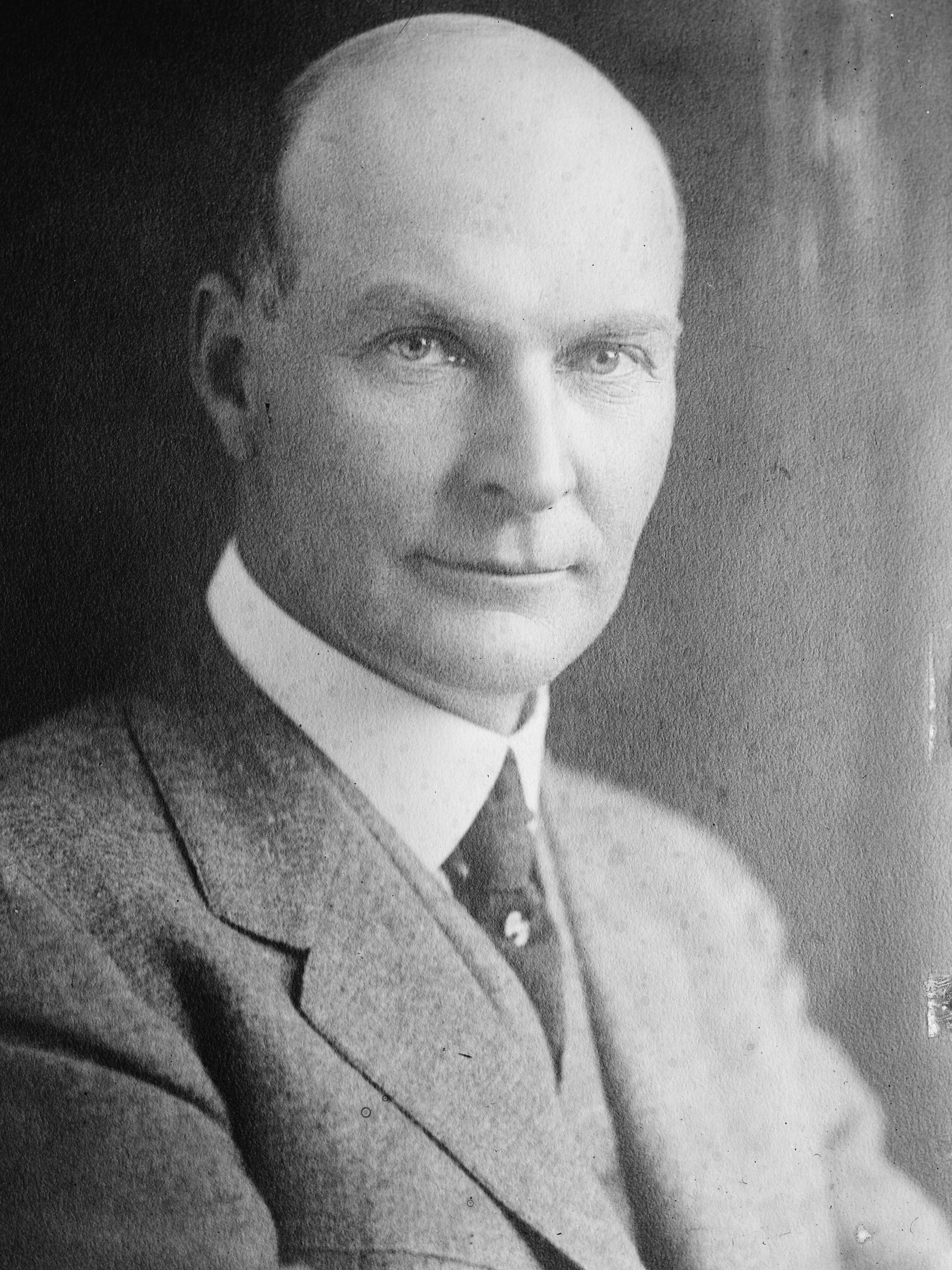

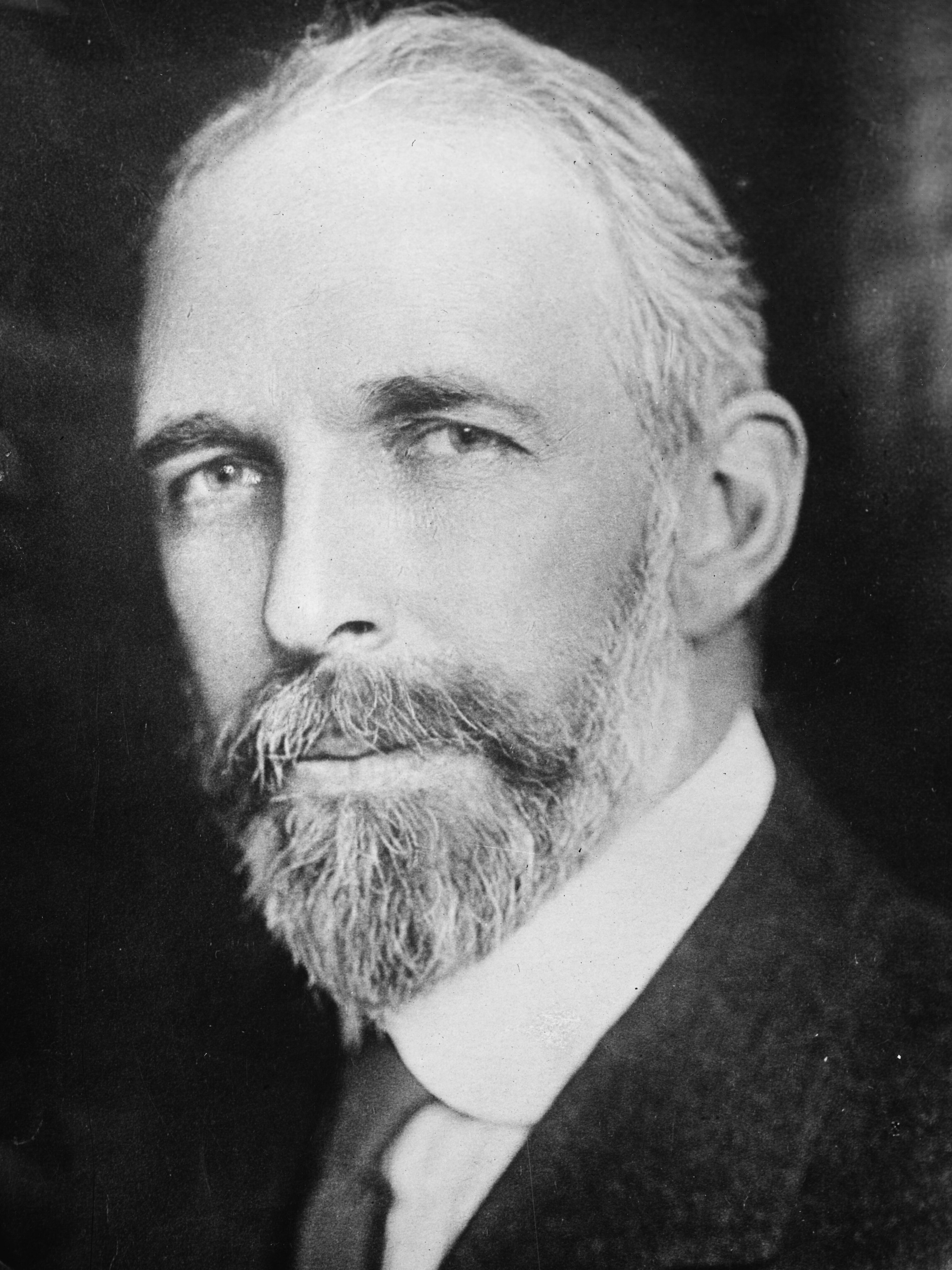
Nominee	John H. Trumbull	Charles G. Morris
Party	Republican	Democratic
Popular vote	296,216	252,209
Percentage	53.57%	45.61%
- Trumbull: 40–50% 50–60% 60–70% 70–80% 80–90% Morris: 40–50% 50–60% 60–70% 70–80%
Governor before election
John H. Trumbull
Republican
Elected Governor
John H. Trumbull
Republican

The 1928 Connecticut gubernatorial election was held on November 6, 1928. It was a rematch of the 1926 Connecticut gubernatorial election. Incumbent Republican John H. Trumbull defeated Democratic nominee Charles G. Morris with 53.57% of the vote.

== General election ==
=== Candidates ===
Major party candidates

- John H. Trumbull, Republican
- Charles G. Morris, Democratic

Other candidates

- Jasper McLevy, Socialist
- William Mackenzie, Farmer–Labor
- Michael P. O'Lean, Socialist Labor

=== Results ===
1928 Connecticut gubernatorial election
Party	Candidate	Votes	%	±%
Republican	John H. Trumbull (incumbent)	296,216	53.57%	
Democratic	Charles G. Morris	252,209	45.61%	
Socialist	Jasper McLevy	3,184	0.58%	
Farmer–Labor	William Mackenzie	747	0.14%	
Socialist Labor	Michael P. O'Lean	617	0.11%	
Majority		44,007		
Turnout				
Republican hold		Swing		
