= Pomperaug =

17th-century Native American leader from Connecticut

Pomperaug (fl. 1639–1662) was a sachem of the Potatuck in western Connecticut. He was a significant leader during early colonial settlement of the area around Woodbury, Connecticut. He is the namesake of the Pomperaug River.

== Biography ==
It not known when Pomperaug became sachem of the Potatucks. At the date of the settlement Milford and Stratford, Connecticut in 1639, he was chief of note among the western clans, his tribe at that time being the most considerable of them. The hill at the south end of Woodbury, across the river, west, was called Castle Rock, from the fact that Pomperaug, the last sachem before the advent of the whites, had there his principal wigwam, or castle.

Pomperaug's reign was long one, being succeeded by Aquiomp in 1662. A Woodbury resident named Jesse Minor claimed to remember the burial of Chief Pomperaug. According to his recollection, a large company of Pomperaug's tribe was seen passing through the streets silently bearing his body, laying him down to rest in the shadow of a cliff on the western side of the trail that led from the Housatonic River to the Naugatuck River.

== Gravesite ==
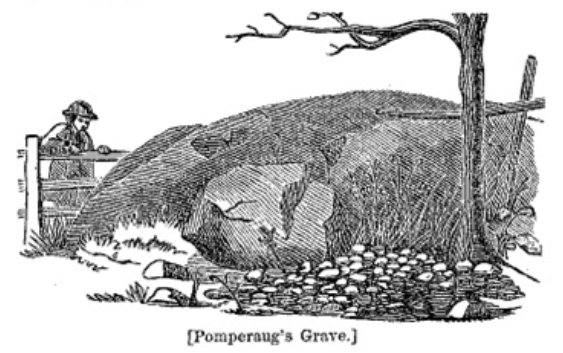
Pomperaug's grave depicted by William Cothran in his History of ancient Woodbury, Connecticut (1872)

Although the principal seat of this tribe was at the Pootatuck Village, on the east side of the Housatonic River, about two miles above Bennetts Bridge, yet, from some cause, he chose to be buried by large rock, on the west side of the main street in Woodbury. The spot is now marked by a huge boulder located nearly opposite King Solomon's Lodge. In the 19th century, school children in their leisure hours often climbed the ledge to enjoy the view of the river valley and Castle Rock. They recalled the grave mounds which were side by side at the base of the rock.

Pomperaug's people had a custom of honoring their dead chiefs, when laid in their last repose. As each tribal member, whether they were on his hunting expeditions or the war-path, passed the grave of their honored chief, they reverently cast thereon small stone, selected for that purpose, as a token of respect and remembrance.

At the first settlement of Woodbury, large heaps of stones had accumulated in this way, and as of 1872, a considerable quantity yet remained, after the tillage of the field in its vicinity for the long period of two hundred years. These stones, thus accumulated, were of many different varieties, large number of them not to be found in the valley, nor within long distances, showing clearly, that there was purpose in their accumulation, and verifying the "tradition of the elders," that they were gathered there as monument of respect and honor to buried chieftain.

== Legacy ==
The Pomperaug River is named in honor of Pomperaug, which runs through the Pomperaug Valley. Pomperaug High School subsequently bears his name.

There was also a village called Pomperaug, and was so called from its having been the location of the cabin of Pomperaug, living there long after the settlement of whites in the area.
