= Anson T. McCook =

American attorney, soldier, and politician (1881–1967)

56th Treasurer of Connecticut
- In office August 16, 1924 – January 7, 1925
- Governor: Charles A. Templeton
- Preceded by: G. Harold Gilpatric
- Succeeded by: Ernest E. Rogers

Personal details
- Born: Anson Theodore McCook; March 30, 1881 Hartford, Connecticut, U.S.
- Died: March 14, 1967 (aged 85) Hartford, Connecticut, U.S.
- Party: Republican
- Parent(s): John James McCook; Eliza Sheldon Butler
- Relatives: Fighting McCooks
- Education: Trinity College (BA); Harvard Law School (LLB)
- Profession: Attorney, military officer
- Awards: Distinguished Service Cross

Military service
- Allegiance: United States
- Branch/service: United States Army
- Years of service: 1917–1919
- Rank: Major
- Unit: 304th Infantry Regiment
- Battles/wars: World War I * Meuse–Argonne offensive

Anson Theodore McCook (March 30, 1881 – March 14, 1967) was an American attorney, decorated World War I officer, Republican politician, and historic preservationist from Hartford, Connecticut. A member of the prominent "Fighting McCooks" military family, he served briefly as the 56th Connecticut State Treasurer from August 1924 to January 1925.

== Early life and education ==
McCook was born on March 30, 1881, in Hartford, Connecticut, to the Reverend John James McCook, an Episcopal priest, Civil War veteran, and professor of modern languages at Trinity College, and Eliza Sheldon Butler. He grew up in the historic 1782 Butler–McCook House & Garden on Main Street in downtown Hartford.

He attended Trinity College in Hartford, graduating as valedictorian of the class of 1902. He subsequently attended Harvard Law School, earning his Bachelor of Laws (LL.B.) degree in 1906. Following his admission to the Connecticut bar, he returned to Hartford to practice corporate, probate, and municipal law.

== Military service ==
Prior to the United States' entry into World War I, McCook attended the civilian military training camps at Plattsburg, New York. After the U.S. declaration of war in 1917, he was commissioned as a captain in the U.S. Army Reserve and deployed to France with the 304th Infantry Regiment, part of the 76th Division.

McCook saw combat on the Western Front, including during the Meuse–Argonne offensive, and was promoted to the rank of major. For extraordinary heroism in action during the campaign, he was awarded the Distinguished Service Cross. During World War II, he later served as a commander in the Connecticut State Guard.

== Legal and political career ==
In Hartford, McCook practiced law for more than five decades, serving as a partner in firms including McCook, Weldon & Perkins and Alcorn, Bakewell & Smith.

Active in Republican politics, McCook served on Hartford's municipal council before running as the Republican nominee for Mayor of Hartford in 1922, losing narrowly in the general election.

On August 16, 1924, Governor Charles A. Templeton appointed McCook as Connecticut State Treasurer to fill the vacancy created by the resignation of G. Harold Gilpatric. McCook did not seek a full term in the November 1924 general election and served until his elected successor, Ernest E. Rogers, took office on January 7, 1925.

In 1934, McCook was the Republican nominee for the United States House of Representatives in Connecticut's 1st congressional district, losing to Democratic incumbent Herman P. Kopplemann.

Political offices
Preceded by G. Harold Gilpatric	Treasurer of Connecticut; 1924–1925	Succeeded by Ernest E. Rogers
