= Pomperaug River =

River in the United States of America

Coordinates: 41.4420°N 73.2556°W

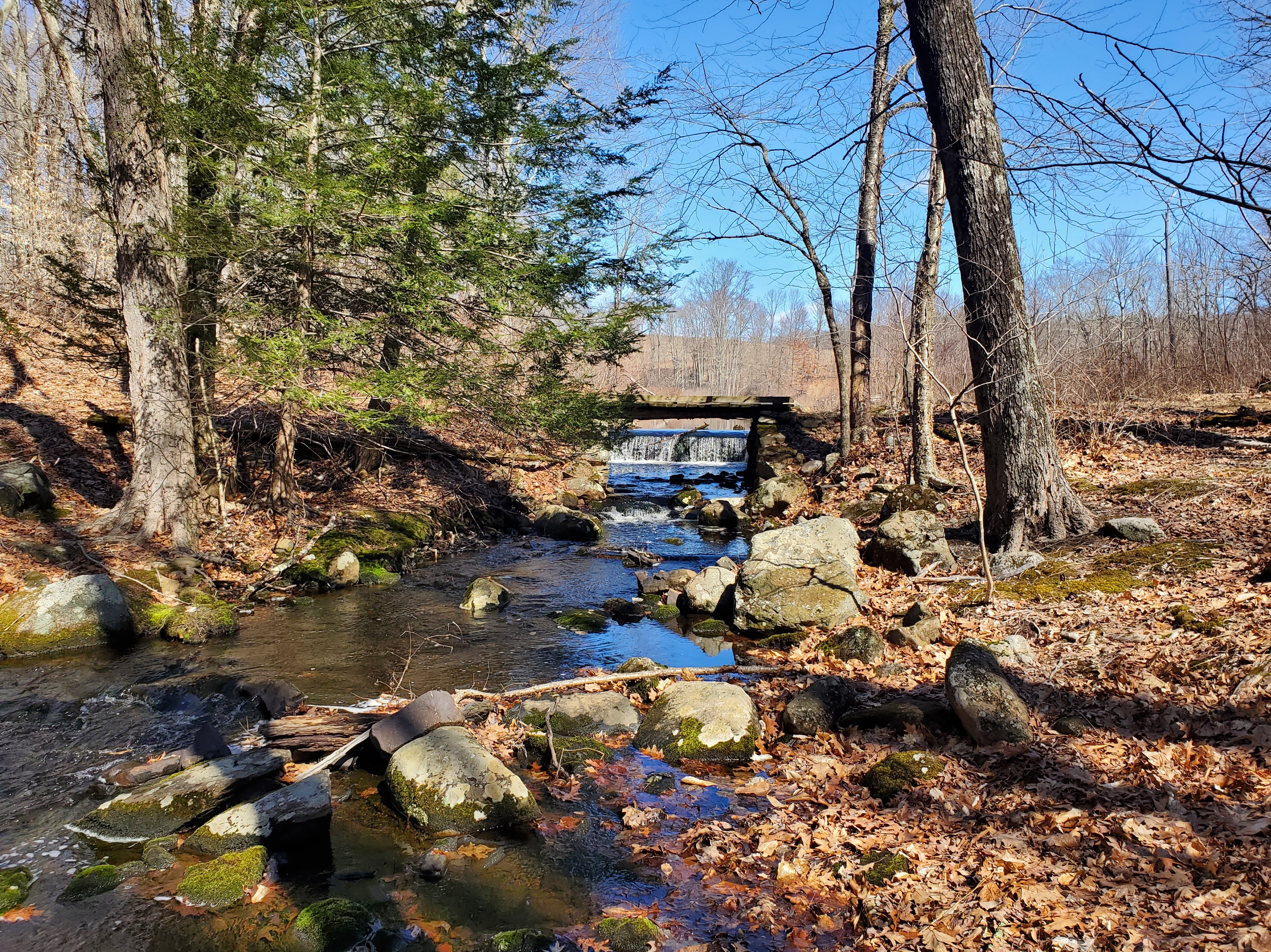
South Brook, a tributary of the Pomperaug River, in Woodbury

The Pomperaug River is a 13.4-mile-long (21.6 km) river in the US state of Connecticut. The two main tributaries to the Pomperaug are the Nonnewaug River and the Weekeepeemee River; their confluence forms the Pomperaug and Woodbury developed here. The river flows through Woodbury and the Town of Southbury, where it empties into the Housatonic River at Lake Zoar.

The name of the river is derived from a local Native American language, likely Paugussett, and is named for Pomperaug, a leader of the Potatuck. The locality of Pomperaug in Woodbury takes its name from the river. The Pomperaug is the namesake for the nearby Pomperaug High School.

Several districts that developed along the river have now been designated as historic: Woodbury Historic District 1, Woodbury Historic District 2, the Russian Village Historic District and the South Britain Historic District.

== See also ==
- List of Connecticut rivers
