= 1934 Connecticut gubernatorial election =

- November 6, 1934
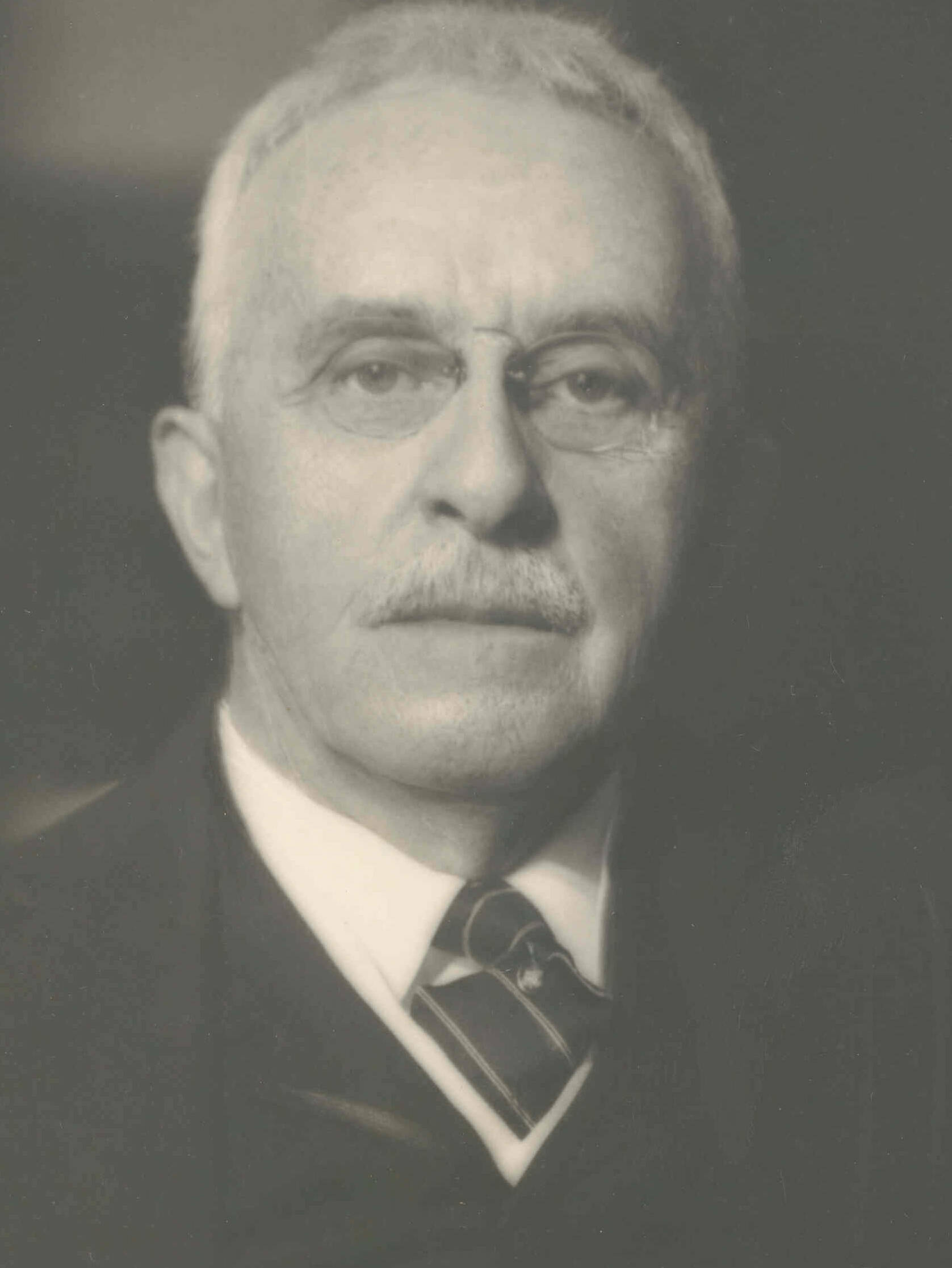

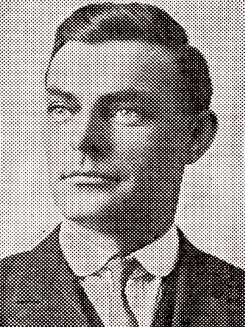
Nominee	Wilbur Lucius Cross	Hugh Meade Alcorn	Jasper McLevy
Party	Democratic	Republican	Socialist
Popular vote	257,996	249,397	38,438
Percentage	46.71%	45.16%	6.96%
- Cross: 40–50% 50–60% 60–70% Alcorn: 40–50% 50–60% 60–70% 70–80% 80–90% McLevy: 40–50%
Governor before election
Wilbur Lucius Cross
Democratic
Elected Governor
Wilbur Lucius Cross
Democratic

The 1934 Connecticut gubernatorial election was held on November 6, 1934. Incumbent Democrat Wilbur Lucius Cross defeated Republican nominee Hugh Meade Alcorn with 46.71% of the vote.

== General election ==
=== Candidates ===
Major party candidates

- Wilbur Lucius Cross, Democratic
- Hugh Meade Alcorn, Republican

Other candidates

- Jasper McLevy, Socialist
- Alvin M. Gully, Socialist Labor
- William E. Hogan, Independent
- Isadore Wofsy, Communist

=== Results ===
1934 Connecticut gubernatorial election
Party	Candidate	Votes	%	±%
Democratic	Wilbur Lucius Cross (incumbent)	257,996	46.71%	
Republican	Hugh Meade Alcorn	249,397	45.16%	
Socialist	Jasper McLevy	38,438	6.96%	
Socialist Labor	Alvin M. Gully	3,734	0.68%	
Independent	William E. Hogan	1,445	0.26%	
Communist	Isadore Wofsy	1,283	0.23%	
Majority		8,599		
Turnout				
Democratic hold		Swing		
