= 1936 Connecticut gubernatorial election =

- November 3, 1936
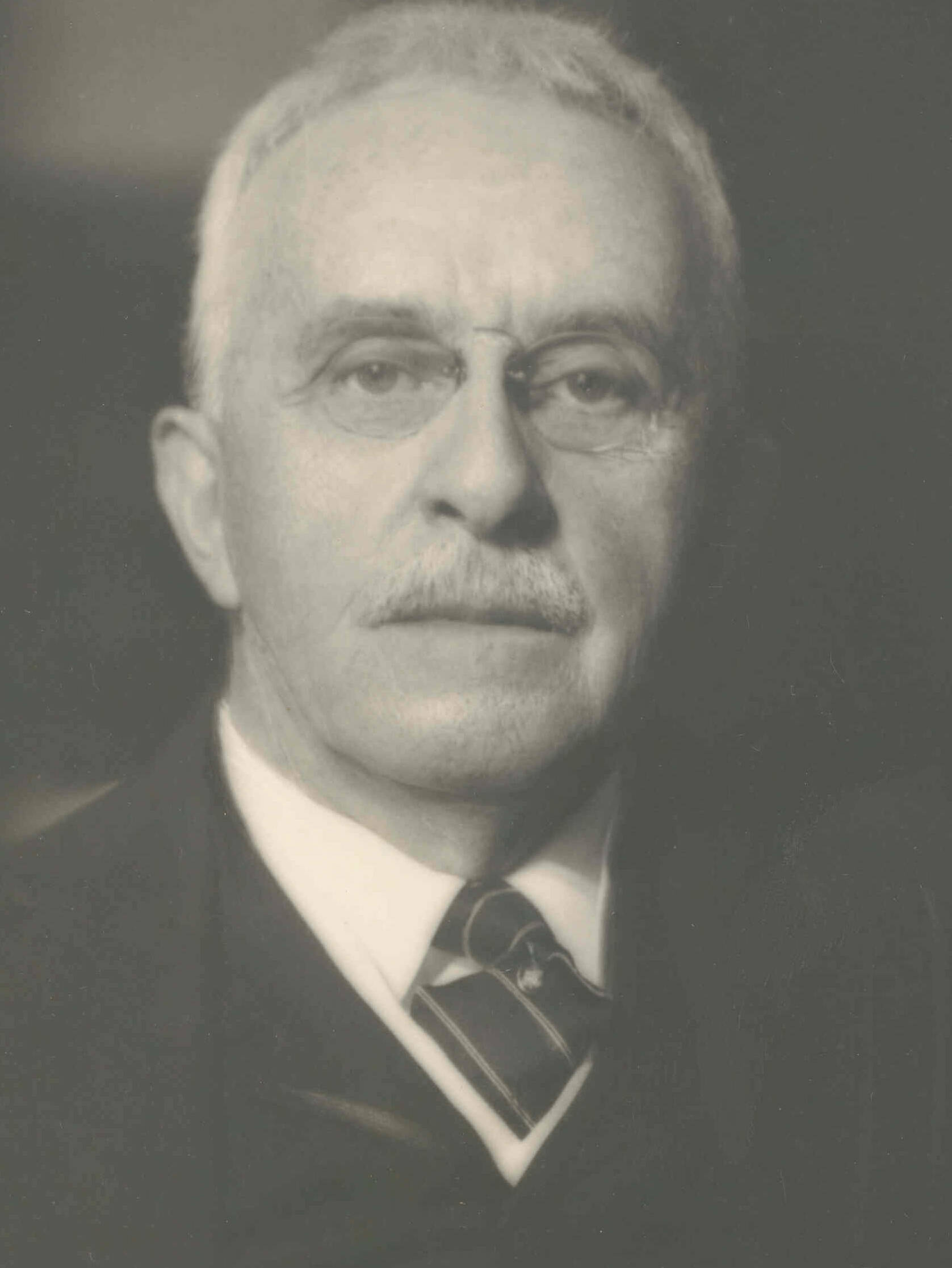

Nominee	Wilbur Lucius Cross	Arthur M. Brown
Party	Democratic	Republican
Popular vote	372,953	277,190
Percentage	55.29%	41.10%
- Cross: 40–50% 50–60% 60–70% 70–80% Brown: 40–50% 50–60% 60–70% 70–80%
Governor before election
Wilbur Lucius Cross
Democratic
Elected Governor
Wilbur Lucius Cross
Democratic

The 1936 Connecticut gubernatorial election was held on November 3, 1936. Incumbent Democrat Wilbur Lucius Cross defeated Republican nominee Arthur M. Brown with 55.29% of the vote.

== General election ==
=== Candidates ===
Major party candidates

- Wilbur Lucius Cross, Democratic
- Arthur M. Brown, Republican

Other candidates

- Jasper McLevy, Socialist
- Joseph Mackay, Socialist Labor
- Isadore Wofsy, Communist

=== Results ===
1936 Connecticut gubernatorial election
Party	Candidate	Votes	%	±%
Democratic	Wilbur Lucius Cross (incumbent)	372,953	55.29%	
Republican	Arthur M. Brown	277,190	41.10%	
Socialist	Jasper McLevy	20,993	3.11%	
Socialist Labor	Joseph Mackay	2,124	0.32%	
Communist	Isadore Wofsy	1,225	0.18%	
Majority		95,763		
Turnout				
Democratic hold		Swing		
