= George Grebenstchikoff =

Russian Siberian writer

- Георгий Дмитриевич Гребенщиков
- Portrait of George Grebenstchikoff at Churaevka, circa 1925.
- Born: 6 May [O.S. 24 April] 1883; Nikolayevsky Rudnik, Tomsk Governorate, Russian Empire
- Died: 11 January 1964 (aged 80); USA
- Occupations: Writer; journalist; chief editor; publisher; professor; activist
- Employers: Altai Life (newspaper); Florida Southern College
- Writing career
- Language: Russian
- Years active: since 1905
- Period: Modern
- Genres: Novel; novella; short story; sketch; essay; opinion journalism; literary criticism; lecture
- Notable work: The Churaevs (6 volumes)
- Movement: Realism

George Dmitrievich Grebenstchikoff (Russian: Георгий Дмитриевич Гребенщиков; 6 May [24 April Old Style] 1883 – 11 January 1964) was a writer and professor of Russian literature.

== Personal life ==
Grebenstchikoff was born in Nikolayevsky Rudnik, Tomsk Governorate, Russian Empire (now in East Kazakhstan Province, Kazakhstan). George's mother, Elena Petrovna Grebenstchikoff, encouraged him to learn to read and write at an early age, an uncommon skill in a typical family of miners. He began writing poetry at the age of nine, but his father, Dmitri Lukich Grebenstchikoff, had taken George with him into the lumber industry, thus curtailing any further elementary education. While serving in the Imperial Russian Army during the First World War, he met Tatiana Denisovna Stadnik. Tatiana was serving as a nurse with the Red Cross. She was former ballerina with the Mariinsky Theatre in St. Petersburg.

== Career ==
At the age of twelve, George left his hometown for the nearby city of Semipalatinsk to earn a living through a variety of jobs: making postmarks, washing dishes, being an apprentice to a pharmacist, and assisting in a hospital. At fourteen, George became a scribe for the city magistrate and was able to pursue his scholarly interests. He first began publishing his literary work in 1905, writing reviews, reports, and short stories for the local newspapers. In 1909, George published his first play. In the spring of 1909, George toured Moscow and St. Petersburg for the first time. He also visited Leo Tolstoy at the novelist's estate in Yasnaya Polyana. Upon his return home, George surveyed Altai and read lectures with an ethnographic team. George continued his literary profession in Barnaul, where he became editor and journalist for the paper "Altai Life" at Barnaul. In 1912, George met Maxim Gorky and received influential praise for his writing, establishing himself firmer as an author.

Grebenstchikoff published segments of his serialized novel Churaevy before emigrating to Paris (1921) and then the United States (1924). George pursued a prolific literary career in France until meeting Nicholas Roerich in Paris in 1923, a painter who became instrumental in the Grebenstchikoffs' spiritual direction and their subsequent departure for America. As the couple prepared for their final step in emigration, George formed his first publishing company, Alatas, with Roerich.

In April 1924, the Grebenstchikoffs arrived in New York and a year later, in 1925, George and Ilia Tolstoi (son of Russian novelist Leo Tolstoi) founded the Churaevka artists' colony in Southbury, Connecticut. The village enjoyed visits from numerous Russian poets, musicians and scientists such as inventor Igor Sikorsky, singer Fyodor Chaliapine and sculptor Sergey Konenkov. Grebenstchikoff continued to direct the Alatas Publishing House, which he operated at Churaevak beginning in 1927. In the early 1940s, the Grebenstchikoffs moved to Lakeland, Florida, and began working at Florida Southern College. George taught courses in creative writing and Russian literature, while Tatiana specialized in printing and managed the school's printing press. The couple taught at the university until retirement in 1955.

In addition to The Churaevs, Grebenstchikoff's principal writings include the novel The Turbulent Giant (1940) and Egorkina zhizn', an autobiographical work.

== Literary archives ==
The George and Tatiana Grebenstchikoff papers at the Immigration History Research Center Archives (collection number IHRC809), University of Minnesota Libraries, consist of seventeen linear feet of correspondence, diaries, photographs, manuscripts, audio recordings and printed material.

Additional archival material can be found in the Alyce Batchelder Collection of George Grebenstchikoff. General Collection, Beinecke Rare Book and Manuscript Library, Yale University.

== Bibliography ==
- V prostorakh Sibirii (1913-1915)
- Zmei Gorynych (1916)
- Step' da nebo (1917)
- The Churaevs (six volumes, 1922-1937)
- Bylina o Mikulie Buianoviche (1924), published in English as The Turbulent Giant (1940)
- Egorkina Zhizn' (1953 and 1957)
