= 1932 Connecticut gubernatorial election =

- November 8, 1932
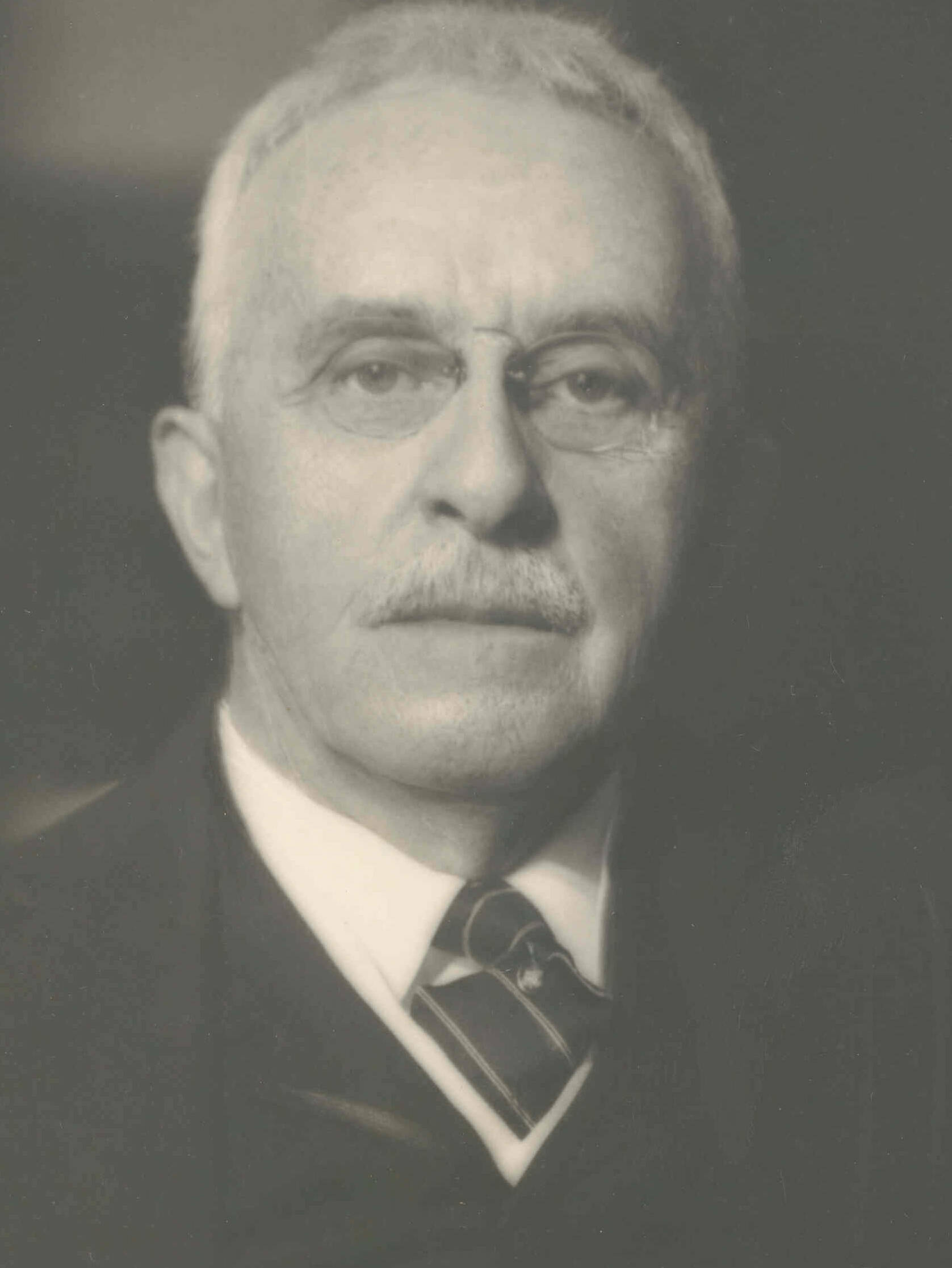

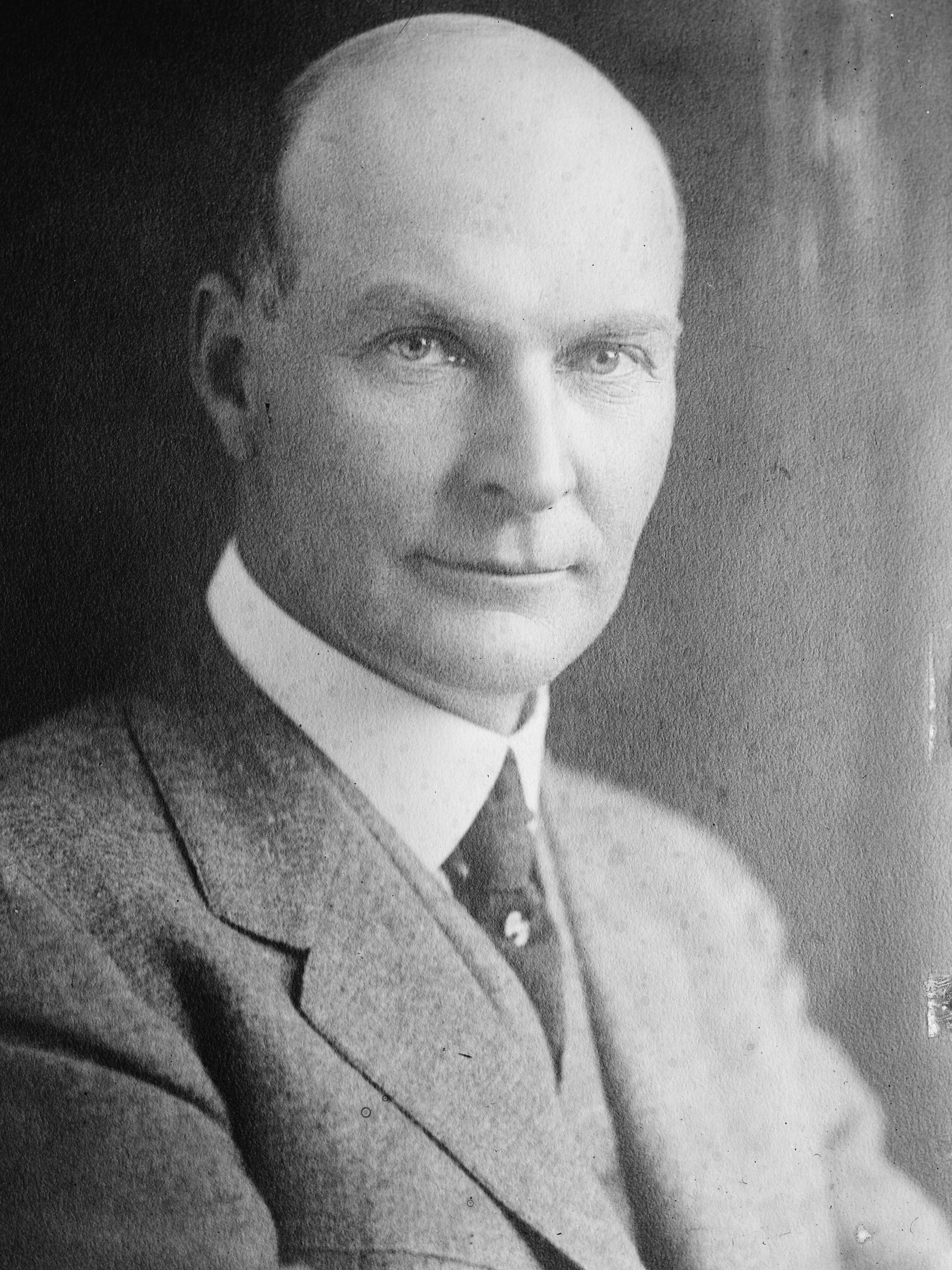
Nominee	Wilbur Lucius Cross	John H. Trumbull
Party	Democratic	Republican
Popular vote	288,347	277,503
Percentage	48.44%	46.62%
- Cross: 40–50% 50–60% 60–70% 70–80% Trumbull: 40–50% 50–60% 60–70% 70–80% 80–90% Tie: 50%
Governor before election
Wilbur Lucius Cross
Democratic
Elected Governor
Wilbur Lucius Cross
Democratic

The 1932 Connecticut gubernatorial election was held on November 8, 1932. Incumbent Democrat Wilbur Lucius Cross defeated Republican nominee John H. Trumbull with 48.44% of the vote.

== General election ==
=== Candidates ===
Major party candidates

- Wilbur Lucius Cross, Democratic
- John H. Trumbull, Republican

Other candidates

- Jasper McLevy, Socialist
- Albert Levitt, Independent
- Michael P. O'Lean, Socialist Labor
- Isadore Wofsy, Communist

=== Results ===
1932 Connecticut gubernatorial election
Party	Candidate	Votes	%	±%
Democratic	Wilbur Lucius Cross (incumbent)	288,347	48.44%	
Republican	John H. Trumbull	277,503	46.62%	
Socialist	Jasper McLevy	20,637	3.47%	
Independent	Albert Levitt	5,125	0.86%	
Socialist Labor	Michael P. O'Lean	2,295	0.39%	
Communist	Isadore Wofsy	1,360	0.23%	
Majority		10,844		
Turnout				
Democratic hold		Swing		
