= Wilbur Cross (author) =

American author (1918–2019)

- Born: Wilbur Lucius Cross III; August 17, 1918; Scranton, Pennsylvania, U.S.
- Died: March 4, 2019 (aged 100)
- Education: Yale University
- Occupation: Author
- Spouse: Esther Wilkinson

Wilbur Lucius Cross III (August 17, 1918 – March 4, 2019) was an American author who had over 50 books to his credit. He was the grandson of Wilbur Lucius Cross. He spent 10 years as an editor at Life.

== Early life and education ==
Cross wrote mini books for his friends at an early age. He graduated from Kent School in 1937 and Yale University. Upon graduation from Yale, he served in the United States Army and became a captain, and served in the Pacific theater during World War II for 39 months with communications, radar and photo units.

== Career ==
After serving in the army, he worked for an ad agency where he was a copy writer. He became a senior editor for Continental Oil Company, where he wrote CONOCO, The First One Hundred Years.

As a free-lance writer in the 1950s and 1960s, he interviewed General Umberto Nobile and survivors of airship Italia, which crashed in the arctic in 1928, for an article in True magazine. This became the basis for the book, Disaster at the Pole.

He died on March 4, 2019, at the age of 100.

== Books ==
- Challengers of the Deep
- Disaster at the Pole
- Encyclopedia of American Submarines (2003)
- Gullah Culture in America (2012)
- Zeppelins of World War I (2003)
