= John H. Trumbull =

American politician (1873–1961)

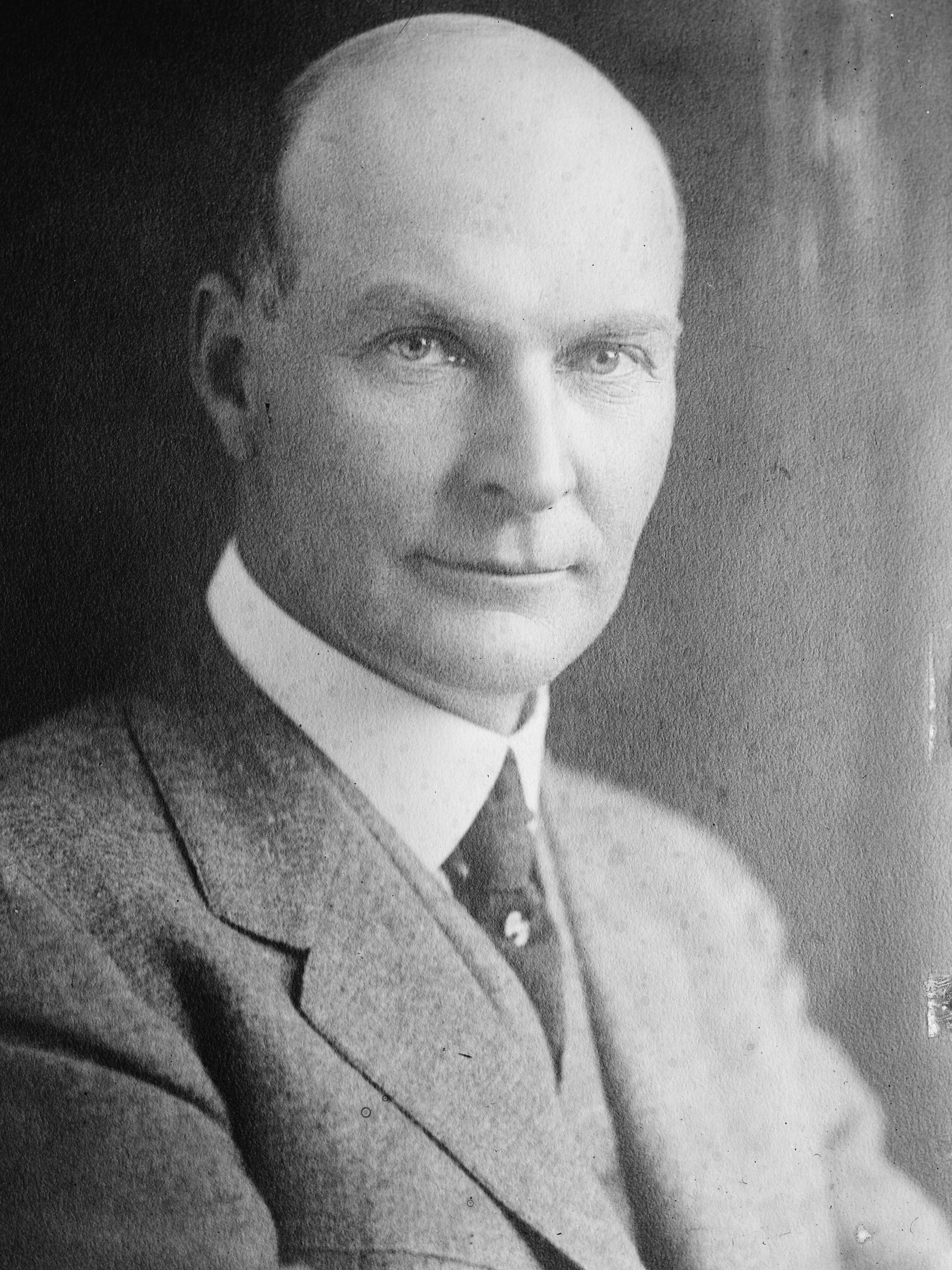

70th Governor of Connecticut
- In office January 8, 1925 – January 7, 1931
- Lieutenant: J. Edwin Brainard; Ernest E. Rogers
- Preceded by: Hiram Bingham III
- Succeeded by: Wilbur Lucius Cross

79th Lieutenant Governor of Connecticut
- In office January 7, 1925 – January 8, 1925
- Governor: Hiram Bingham III
- Preceded by: Hiram Bingham III
- Succeeded by: J. Edwin Brainard

Member of the Connecticut Senate

Personal details
- Born: March 4, 1873 Ashford, Connecticut, U.S.
- Died: May 21, 1961 (aged 88) Hartford, Connecticut, U.S.
- Party: Republican
- Spouse: Maud Pierce Usher (m. 1903)
- Relations: John Coolidge (son-in-law)
- Children: 2

Military service
- Branch/service: Connecticut National Guard
- Rank: Colonel

John Harper Trumbull (March 4, 1873 – May 21, 1961) was an American politician who served as the 70th governor of Connecticut.

== Early life ==
Trumbull was born in Ashford, Connecticut son of Hugh Homer Trumbull (1847–1922) and Mary Ann (Harper) Trumbull (1849–1923). Despite his name, he was not related to the previous governors of Connecticut of the same name, but was the son of Irish immigrants who moved to Ashford in the early 1870s to run a farm. The family later moved to Plainville, Connecticut. Trumbull did not attend college.

== Career ==
As a partner with his brother, Henry and one other man, Frank T. Wheeler, in 1891, he formed the Trumbull Electric Company, which produced electrical supply parts including porcelain fixtures, switchboards and panels. He served as President of that company from 1911 to 1944. It later became part of General Electric. He also was board chairman of Colonial Air Transport, Incorporated; director and treasurer of Plainville Realty Company; president of Plainville Trust Company; and director of Connecticut Light & Power Company (Eversource Energy).

Trumbull joined the First Connecticut Infantry in 1891, attaining the rank of colonel in the State Guard. He was a Republican. Trumbull served in the Connecticut Senate and as president pro tempore from 1923 to 1924, succeeding William H. Hall.

Elected the 79th lieutenant governor in November 1924, Trumbull held that office from January 7 to January 8, 1925, as the governor, Hiram Bingham III, resigned after one day as a governor to become a U.S. Senator. Trumbull had learned to pilot his own airplanes and was dubbed "The Flying Governor" because he often flew into Robertson Field Airport in Plainville.

Trumbull was a conservative Republican and made sure to balance the State budget. He also sought to assist Connecticut's businesses. During his terms in office, the government started a building program and worked at improving the roads of the State. He sponsored an aviation development, and launched numerous construction projects. He was re-elected as governor two times, in 1926 and 1928, but chose not to run for reelection in 1930. He left the office on January 7, 1931. However, he ran for the office again in 1932, but was defeated by his successor, Democratic incumbent Wilbur Cross.

Trumbull continued to oversee his business interests. He also served as a Delegate to the Republican National Convention from Connecticut in 1920 as Alternate. Organizer and president, Trumbull Electric Manufacturing Co.; board chairman, Colonial Air Transport, Inc.; director and treasurer, Plainville Realty Co.; president, Plainville Trust Co.; director, Connecticut Light & Power Co.; delegate to Republican National Convention from Connecticut, 1920 (alternate), 1924, 1928, 1932, and 1936. He stayed active as vice president of the Connecticut Humane Society and the Connecticut Historical Society.

== Personal life ==
Trumbull was married on November 28, 1903, to Maud Pierce Usher (1874–1963), and they had two daughters:

- Florence Trumbull (1904–1998), who married John Coolidge (1906–2000), son of President Calvin Coolidge
- Jean Usher Trumbull (1910–1994) who married Alaric R. Bailey of Jamestown, New York

Trumbull died in Hartford, Connecticut, on May 21, 1961. He is interred at West Cemetery, Plainville, Connecticut.

Party political offices
Preceded by Hiram Bingham III	Republican nominee for Governor of Connecticut; 1926, 1928	Succeeded by Ernest E. Rogers
Preceded by Ernest E. Rogers	Republican nominee for Governor of Connecticut; 1932	Succeeded by Hugh Meade Alcorn
Political offices
Preceded by Hiram Bingham III	Lieutenant Governor of Connecticut; 1925	Succeeded by J. Edwin Brainard
Preceded by Hiram Bingham III	Governor of Connecticut; 1925–1931	Succeeded by Wilbur Lucius Cross
