= 1938 Connecticut gubernatorial election =

- November 8, 1938
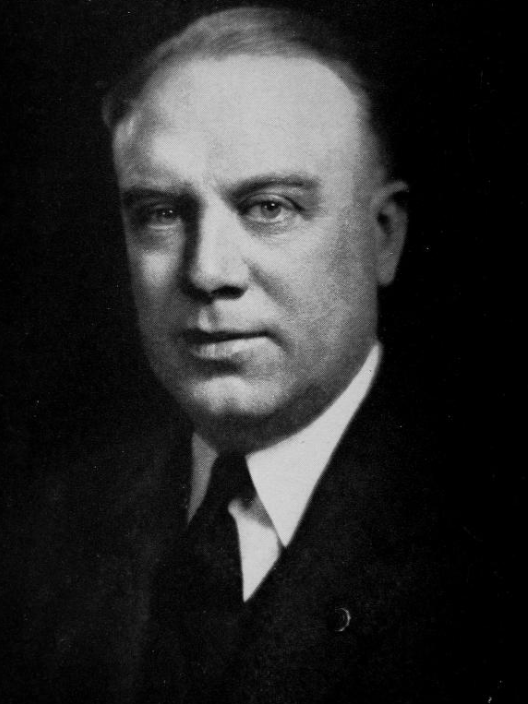

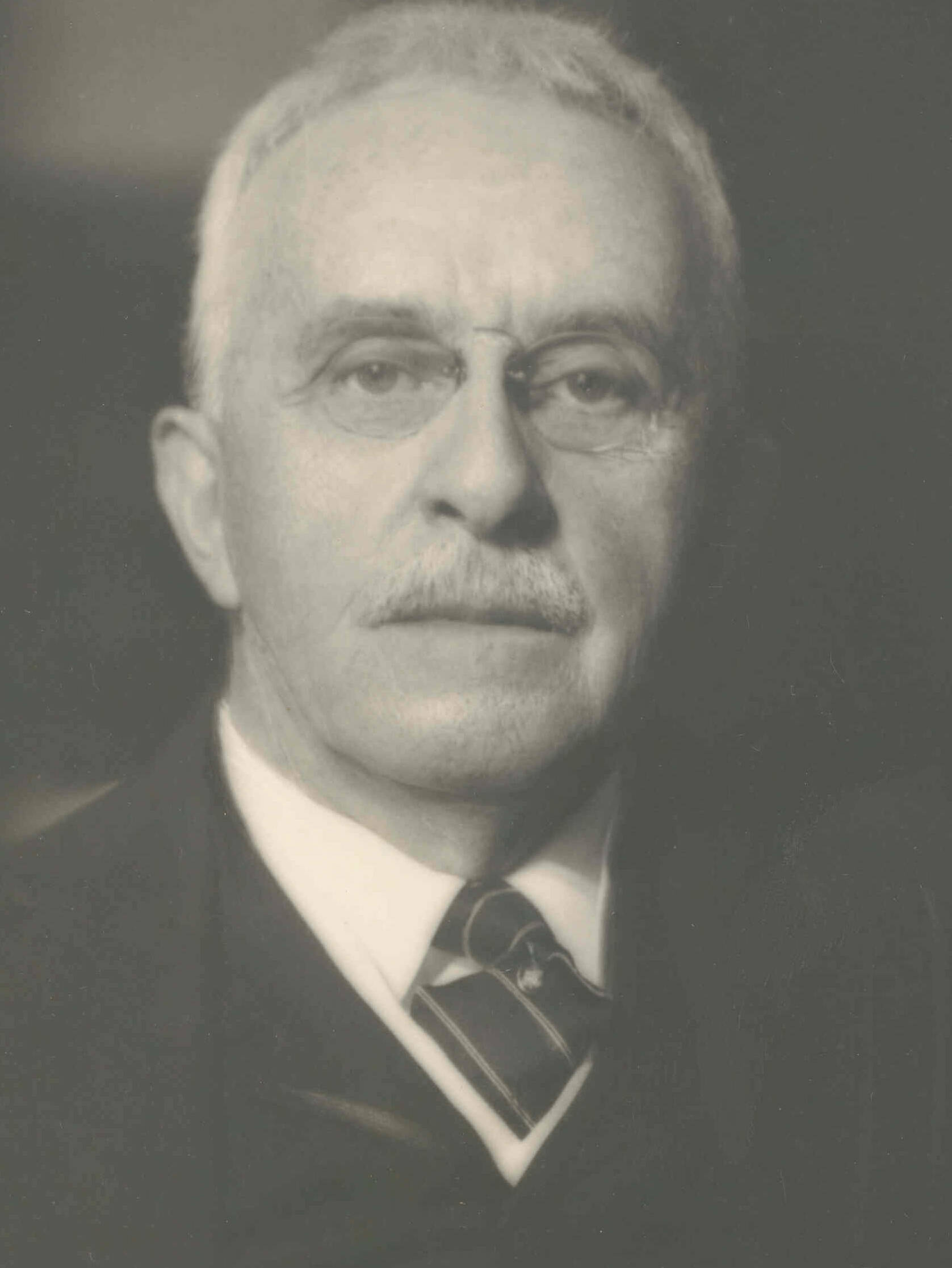

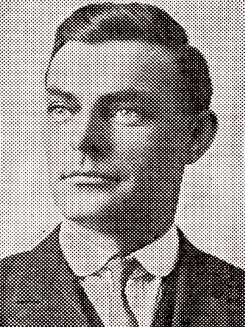
| Nominee | Raymond E. Baldwin | Wilbur Lucius Cross | Jasper McLevy |
| Party | Republican | Democratic | Socialist |
| Popular vote | 230,237 | 227,549 | 166,253 |
| Percentage | 36.43% | 36.00% | 26.30% |
- Baldwin: 30–40% 40–50% 50–60% 60–70% 70–80% Cross: 30–40% 40–50% 50–60% 60–70% McLevy: 40–50% 50–60% 60–70%
Governor before election
Wilbur Lucius Cross
Democratic
Elected Governor
Raymond E. Baldwin
Republican

The 1938 Connecticut gubernatorial election was held on November 8, 1938. Republican nominee Raymond E. Baldwin defeated Democratic incumbent Wilbur Lucius Cross with 36.43% of the vote.

== General election ==
=== Candidates ===
Major party candidates

- Raymond E. Baldwin, Republican
- Wilbur Lucius Cross, Democratic

Other candidates

- Jasper McLevy, Socialist
- Joseph C. Borden Jr., Socialist Labor
- Devere Allen, Independent

=== Results ===
1938 Connecticut gubernatorial election
| Party | Candidate | Votes | % | ±% |
|---|---|---|---|---|
| Republican | Raymond E. Baldwin | 230,237 | 36.43% | |
| Democratic | Wilbur Lucius Cross (incumbent) | 227,549 | 36.00% | |
| Socialist | Jasper McLevy | 166,253 | 26.30% | |
| Socialist Labor | Joseph C. Borden Jr. | 7,271 | 1.15% | |
| Independent | Devere Allen | 773 | 0.12% | |
| Majority | | 2,688 | | |
| Turnout | | | | |
| Republican gain from Democratic | | Swing | | |
