= Wilbur Lucius Cross =

American politician and scholar (1862–1948)

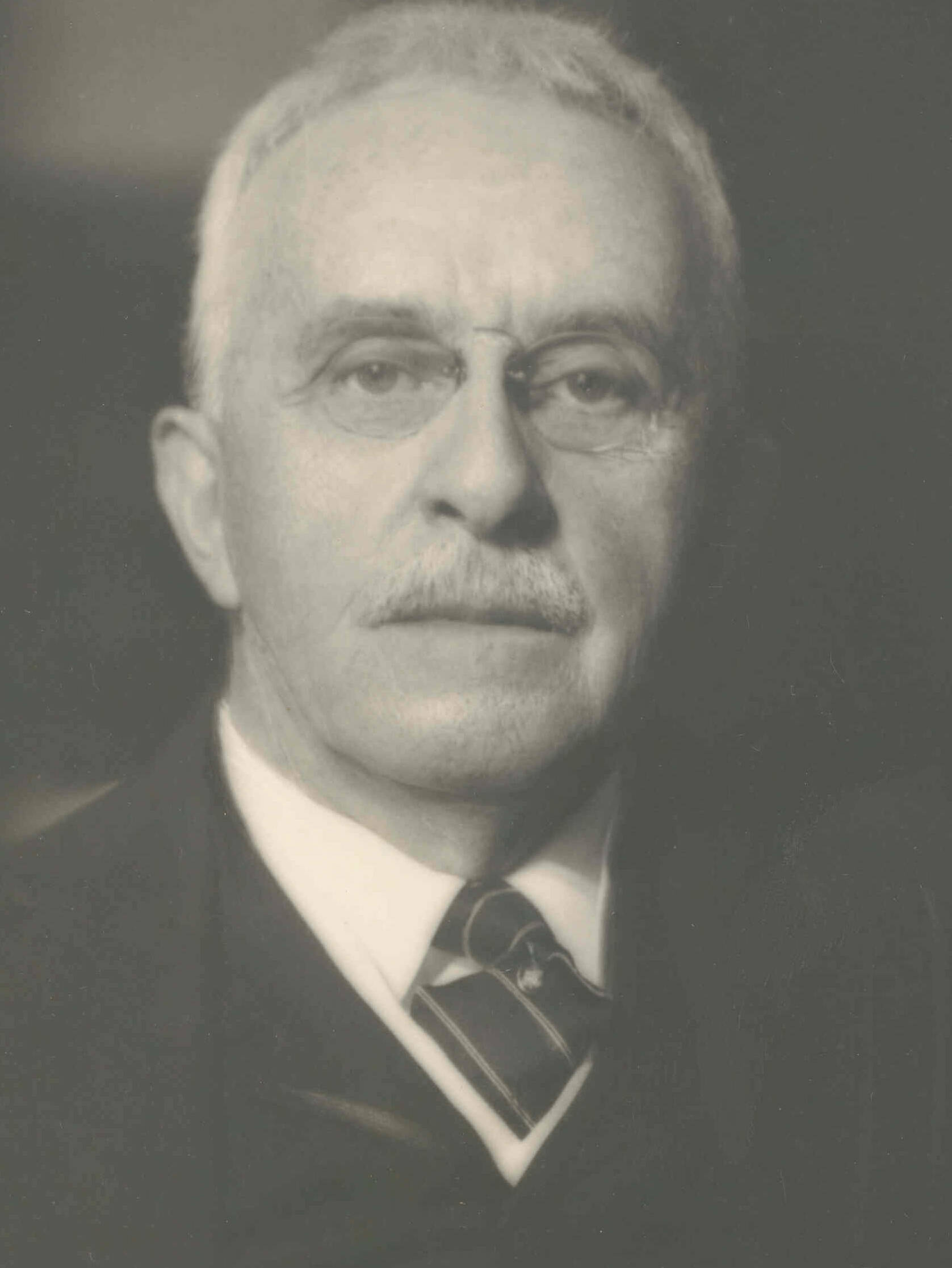

71st Governor of Connecticut
- In office January 7, 1931 – January 4, 1939
- Lieutenant: Samuel R. Spencer; Roy C. Wilcox; T. Frank Hayes
- Preceded by: John H. Trumbull
- Succeeded by: Raymond E. Baldwin

Personal details
- Born: April 10, 1862 Mansfield, Connecticut, U.S.
- Died: October 5, 1948 (aged 86) New Haven, Connecticut, U.S.
- Party: Democratic
- Spouse: Helen Baldwin Avery Cross
- Children: Wilbur Lucius Cross, Jr. Avery Cross; Elizabeth Cross; Arthur Cross; Wilbur Cross III (grandson)
- Education: Yale University
- Profession: Literary critic, editor, author, politician

Wilbur Lucius Cross (April 10, 1862 – October 5, 1948) was an American literary critic who served as the 71st governor of Connecticut from 1931 to 1939.

== Biography ==
Born in 1862 in Mansfield, Cross attended Natchaug School in Willimantic. He graduated from Yale College with a B.A. in 1885 and served as principal of Staples High School in Westport for a short time before returning to Yale as a graduate student, earning a PhD in English literature in 1889. Cross spent several years as a high school principal and schoolteacher at Staples High School in Westport before being offered a job as a professor of English at Yale in 1894. Over the next 36 years, he taught at Yale, became editor of the Yale Review, Sterling Professor of English in 1922, and Dean of the Yale Graduate School from 1916 to 1930. On July 17, 1889, he was married to Helen Baldwin Avery, and they had four children; Wilbur Lucius Cross, Jr., Avery Cross, Elizabeth Cross, and Arthur Cross.

Cross became a well-known literary critic. Along with C. F. Tucker Brooke, Cross was the editor of the Yale Shakespeare; he also edited the Yale Review for almost 30 years. He wrote several books, including Life and Times of Laurence Sterne (1909) and The History of Henry Fielding (1918), and several books on the English novel.

After retiring from Yale, Cross was elected governor of Connecticut as a Democrat in 1930 and served as Governor for four two-year terms, from January 7, 1931, to January 4, 1939. He was a Delegate to the Democratic National Convention from Connecticut in 1936. He was defeated in 1938 in his attempt to gain re-election for a fifth term. He is credited with passage of several items of reform legislation during his tenure of governor, which included measures related to the abolition of child labor, and instituted a minimum wage rate. Also there was legislation that authorized governmental reorganization, and improved factory laws. He also endorsed legislation that authorized funding for the rebuilding of the Connecticut State College, which included the construction of the first campus library, named the Cross Library.

During his tenure, eugenicist Harry H. Laughlin served on a commission proposing radical eugenic policies; these policies were never implemented.

Cross was elected to the American Philosophical Society in 1934.

After retiring from public service, he continued to stay active in his writing and research projects.

== Death and legacy ==
Cross died on October 5, 1948, in New Haven at the age of 86. He is interred at Evergreen Cemetery.

Wilbur Cross High School in New Haven, Wilbur Cross School in Bridgeport, and Connecticut's Wilbur Cross Parkway and Wilbur Cross Highway were named in his honor, as was Yale's Wilbur L. Cross Medal, awarded for outstanding achievement in professional life. The first campus library at the University of Connecticut (then Connecticut State College), built with bond revenues authorized during Cross's governorship and opened in 1939, was named for Cross in 1942.

Wilbur Cross's autobiography, Connecticut Yankee, was published in 1943.

== See also ==
- List of governors of Connecticut

== Works ==
- Proclamations of His Excellency Wilbur L. Cross, Governor of the State of Connecticut. Hartford, CT: Prospect Press, 1937.
- Connecticut Yankee: An Autobiography. New Haven, CT: Yale University Press, 1943.

Party political offices
Preceded by Charles G. Morris	Democratic nominee for Governor of Connecticut; 1930, 1932, 1934, 1936, 1938	Succeeded by Robert A. Hurley
Preceded by Francis T. Maloney	Democratic nominee for U.S. Senator from Connecticut (Class 1); 1946	Succeeded by Joseph M. Tone
Political offices
Preceded by John H. Trumbull	Governor of Connecticut; 1931–1939	Succeeded by Raymond E. Baldwin
