= 1926 Connecticut gubernatorial election =

- November 2, 1926
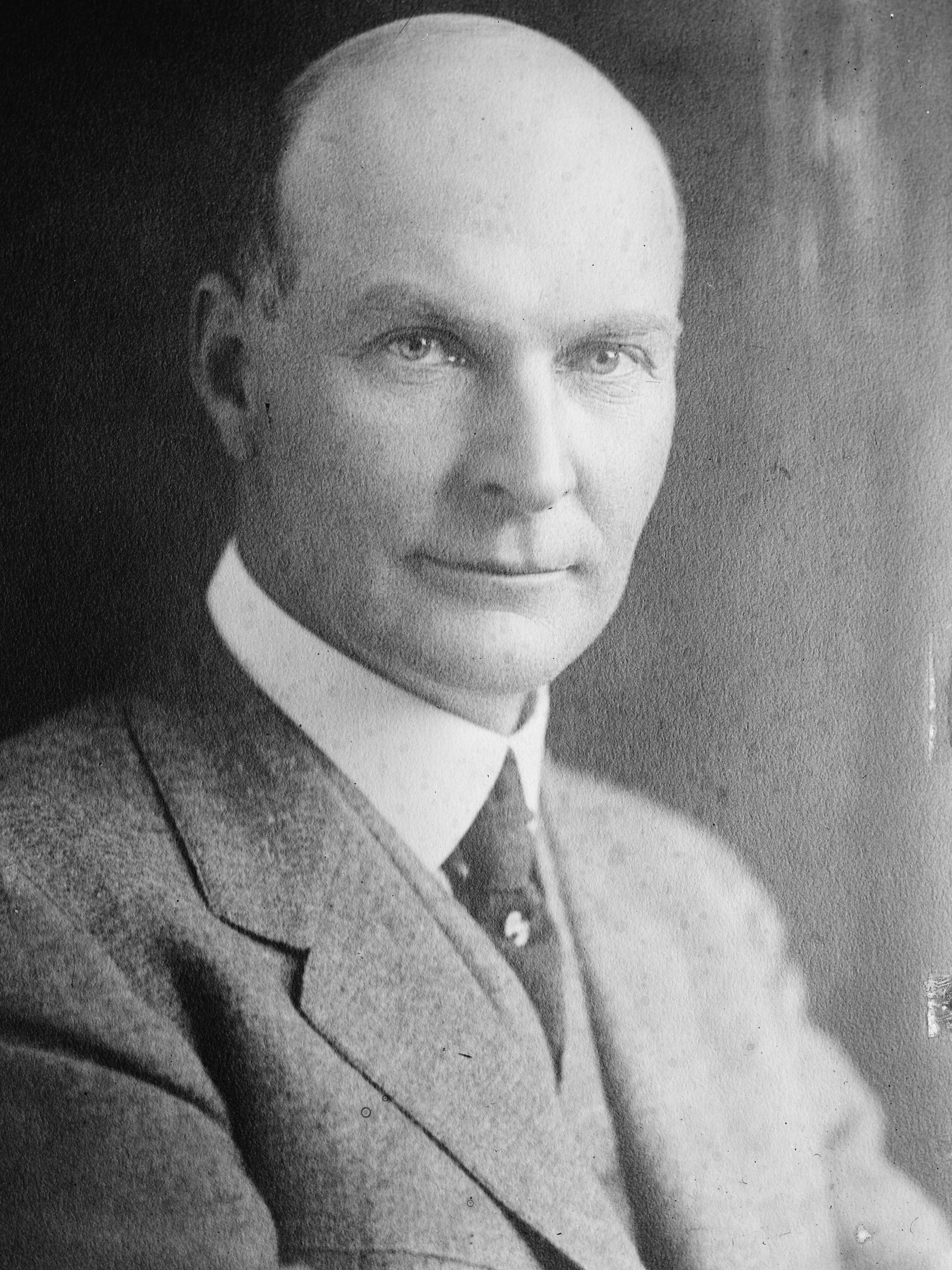

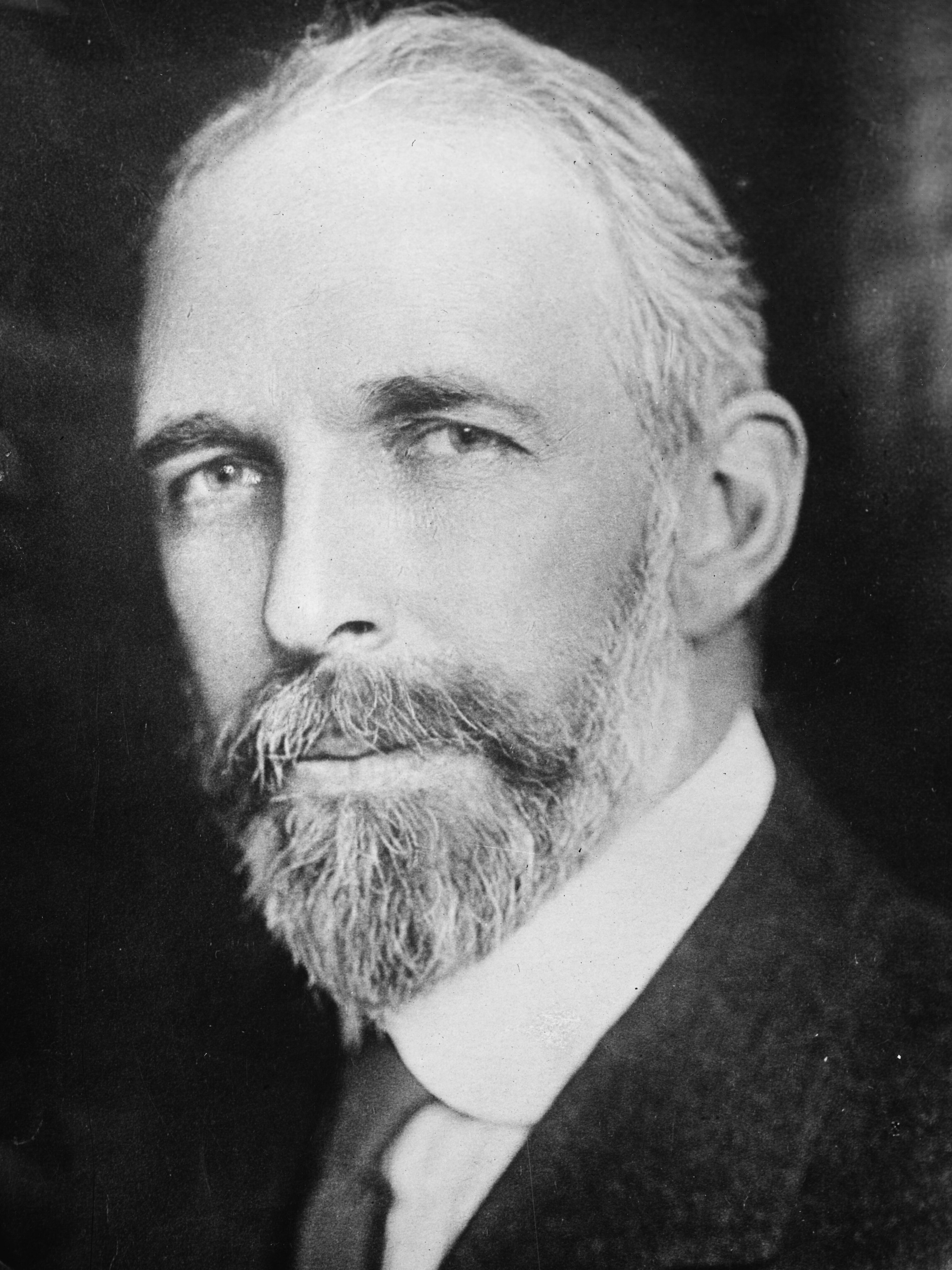
Nominee	John H. Trumbull	Charles G. Morris
Party	Republican	Democratic
Popular vote	192,425	107,045
Percentage	63.58%	35.37%
- Trumbull: 50–60% 60–70% 70–80% 80–90% >90% Morris: 40–50% 50–60% No Data/Vote
Governor before election
John H. Trumbull
Republican
Elected Governor
John H. Trumbull
Republican

The 1926 Connecticut gubernatorial election was held on November 2, 1926. Incumbent Republican John H. Trumbull defeated Democratic nominee Charles G. Morris with 63.58% of the vote.

== General election ==
=== Candidates ===
Major party candidates

- John H. Trumbull, Republican
- Charles G. Morris, Democratic

Other candidates

- Karl C. Jursek, Socialist

=== Results ===
1926 Connecticut gubernatorial election
Party	Candidate	Votes	%	±%
Republican	John H. Trumbull (incumbent)	192,425	63.58%	
Democratic	Charles G. Morris	107,045	35.37%	
Socialist	Karl C. Jursek	3,192	1.06%	
Majority		85,380		
Turnout				
Republican hold		Swing		
