= Southbury (disambiguation) =

Southbury is a town in New Haven County, Connecticut, United States

Southbury also refers to:

== In Connecticut ==
- Southbury Historic District No. 1
- Southbury Training School

== In Enfield, Greater London ==
- Southbury Loop, a loop line running through Southbury station
- Southbury railway station
- Southbury Road, an east–west road in Enfield, in which the station is located
- Southbury (ward), electoral ward in Enfield

== Other uses ==
- The Southbury Child, a play
