= Shane Bannon =

American football player (born 1989)

No. 40
- Position: Fullback

Personal information
- Born: April 20, 1989 (age 37); Middlebury, Connecticut, U.S.
- Listed height: 6 ft 2 in (1.88 m)
- Listed weight: 265 lb (120 kg)

Career information
- High school: Pomperaug (Southbury, Connecticut)
- College: Yale
- NFL draft: 2011: 7th round, 223rd overall pick

Career history
- Kansas City Chiefs (2011–2012)*
- * Offseason or practice squad member only
- Stats at Pro Football Reference

Shane Bannon (born April 20, 1989) is an American former football fullback in the National Football League (NFL). He was selected by the Kansas City Chiefs out of Yale University in the seventh round of the 2011 NFL draft.

== Early life ==
Bannon attended Pomperaug High School in Southbury, Connecticut.

== College career ==
Bannon attended and played college football at Yale. In 2007, he was on the junior varsity team. From 2008–2010, he contributed to the varsity team.

== Professional career ==
Pre-draft measurables
Height	Weight	40-yard dash	10-yard split	20-yard split	20-yard shuttle	Three-cone drill	Vertical jump	Broad jump	Bench press
6 ft 1 1/2 in (1.87 m)	265 lb (120 kg)	4.81 s	1.81 s	2.85 s	4.77 s	7.43 s	29.0 in (0.74 m)	9 ft 1 in (2.77 m)	14 reps
All values from Pro Day

Bannon was selected by the Chiefs out of Yale University in the seventh round (223rd pick overall) in the 2011 NFL draft. He was the first player from Yale to be drafted by an NFL team since the Tampa Bay Buccaneers chose tight end Nate Lawrie in the sixth round (181st pick overall) of the 2004 NFL draft. The Chiefs waived Bannon on September 3, 2011. After he cleared waivers, he was signed to the Chiefs practice squad. He suffered two season-ending injuries in 2011 and 2012. He was released on August 26, 2012.

== Personal life ==
Bannon sits on the Concussion Legacy Foundation's advisory board.
