= Bronson House =

Bronson House may refer to:

in the United States

(by state)

- David Morgan-Earl A. Bronson House, Phoenix, Arizona, listed on the National Register of Historic Places (NRHP) in Maricopa County, Arizona
- Josiah Bronson House, Middlebury, Connecticut, listed on the NRHP in New Haven County, Connecticut
- Aaron Bronson House, Southbury, Connecticut, listed on the NRHP in New Haven County, Connecticut
- Bronson-Mulholland House, Palatka, Florida, listed on the NRHP in Putnam County, Florida
- Dr. George Ashe Bronson House, St. Louis, MO, listed on the NHRP in St. Louis north and west of downtown
- Oliver Bronson House, Hudson, NY, a U.S. National Historic Landmark, also known as Dr. Oliver Bronson House and Stables
