= Adin Wheeler House and Theodore F. Wheeler Wheelwright Shop =

- U.S. National Register of Historic Places
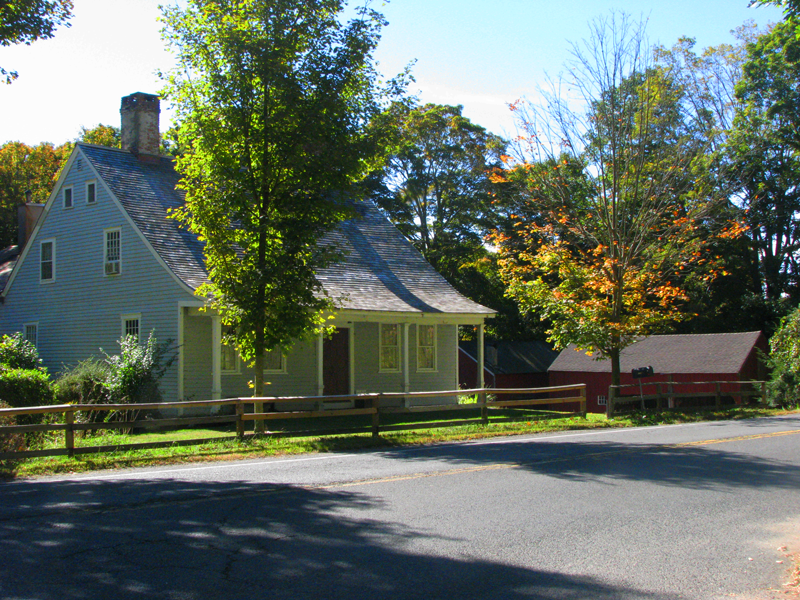

- Location within Connecticut Location within the United States
- Location: 125 Quaker Farms Road, Southbury, Connecticut
- Coordinates: 41°27′37″N 73°09′49″W
- Area: 2 acres (0.81 ha)
- Built: 1790
- Architectural style: Colonial
- NRHP reference No.: 93000661
- Added to NRHP: July 29, 1993

The Adin Wheeler House and Theodore F. Wheeler Wheelwright Shop is a historic property at 125 Quaker Farms Road in Southbury, Connecticut. It includes two well-preserved and little-altered buildings: the house, built in the late 18th century, is a fine Georgian colonial with some uncommon features, and the wheelwright shop is a remarkably complete example of a late 19th-century workshop. The property was listed on the National Register of Historic Places in 1993.

== Description and history ==
The Wheeler property is located in southeastern Southbury, on the east side of Quaker Farms Road near its junction with Burma Road. It is set a short way north of Southford Falls State Park, which contains remnant industrial archaeology associated with the Wheeler family. The property includes the main house, a barn, and the wheelwright shop, a barn-like structure. The house is a 1 1/2-story Cape style wood-frame structure, with a front porch across the front that is sheltered by a bell-cast extension of the main roof. This type of porch roof is uncommon in Connecticut, being reminiscent of Dutch rather than English construction methods. The interior of the house follows a center hall plan, also unusual for the period and a rural setting.

The wheelwright shop is an example of a late 19th-century workshop. It includes a complete brick forge arrangement, with working bellows and tools. Practically the only missing element from an operational works are the belts connecting foot pedals to the power shafts which drive the bellows and a grindstone.

The property was part of the Southford Falls industrial area which was first developed by colonists in the 1740s. The house was probably built in the 1790s by Adin Wheeler, who owned the millworks on the falls with Enos Candee, a business partner whose house also stands nearby. Theodore Wheeler, Adin's great-grandson, built the wheelwright shop in the late 19th century, as well as the major addition to the house, which served as a tap room and public meeting space. When the property was listed on the National Register in 1993, it was still in the hands of Wheeler descendants.

== See also ==
- National Register of Historic Places listings in New Haven County, Connecticut
