= Bullet Hill School =

- U.S. National Register of Historic Places
- U.S. Historic district – Contributing property
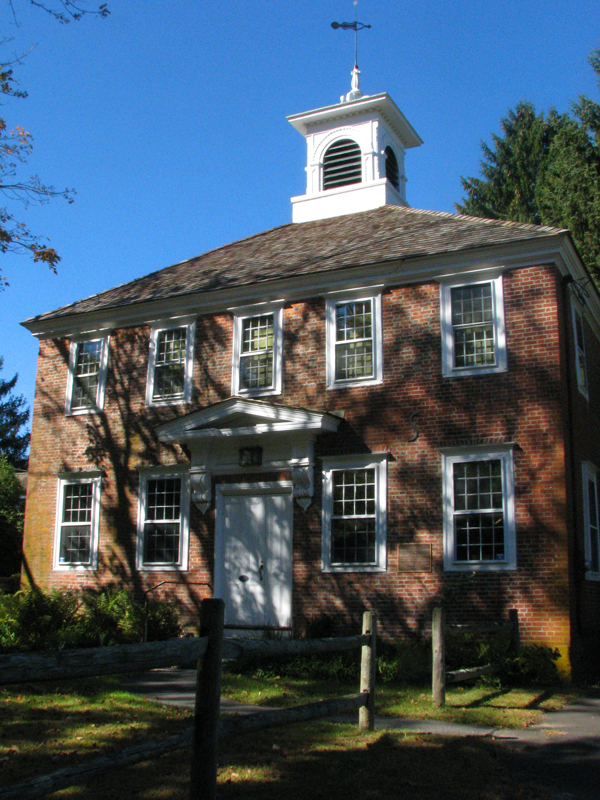

- Location within Connecticut Location within the United States
- Location: Main Street, Southbury, Connecticut
- Coordinates: 41°28′56″N 73°12′50″W
- Area: 0.5 acres (0.20 ha)
- Built: 1790
- Architectural style: Georgian
- Part of: Southbury Historic District No. 1 (ID71000917)
- NRHP reference No.: 72001346

Significant dates
- Added to NRHP: February 23, 1972
- Designated CP: March 11, 1971

The Bullet Hill School is a historic school building on Main Street in Southbury, Connecticut. Built in the last decade of the 18th century, it is one of the oldest brick school buildings in the state of Connecticut. It was listed on the National Register of Historic Places in 1972.

== Description and history ==
The Bullet Hill School is located near the southern end of Southbury's Main Street Historic District, on the West Side of Main Street (U.S. Route 6) a short way north of its Junction with Old Waterbury Road. It is a 2-1/2 story structure, built with load-bearing brick walls laid in Flemish bond and covered by a hip roof. At the center of the roof is a square belfry with round-arch louvered openings, capped by a projecting cornice, cupola, and weathervane. The main facade is five bays wide, with windows arranged symmetrically around the entrance. The entrance is sheltered by a late 19th-century Victorian hood, with heavy scrolled brackets and a pedimented gable.

The school was built sometime in the late 18th century; the town is documented as having paid for repairs to the building in 1800. It was originally used as a schoolroom on the ground floor and a meeting space on the second floor. It served as a school until 1942, at which time the town decided to preserve it as a local historical monument.

== See also ==
- National Register of Historic Places listings in New Haven County, Connecticut
