= Heritage Village, Connecticut =

Census-designated place in Connecticut, United States

- Census-designated place
- Seal

- Location within Connecticut Location within the United States
- Coordinates: 41°29′23″N 73°13′58″W
- Country: United States
- State: Connecticut
- Counties: New Haven
- Region: Naugatuck Valley
- Town: Southbury
- Time zone: UTC-5 (Eastern (EST))
  - Summer (DST): UTC-4 (EDT)
- ZIP Code: 06488 (Southbury)
- Area codes: 203/475
- Website: heritagevillagect.com

Heritage Village is a census-designated place (CDP) in the town of Southbury in New Haven County, Connecticut, United States. As of the 2020 census, Heritage Village had a population of 5,091.

== Geography ==
According to the United States Census Bureau, the CDP has a total area of 2.3 square miles (6.0 km^{2}), all land.

== Demographics ==
=== 2020 census ===
As of the 2020 census, Heritage Village had a population of 5,091. The median age was 73.9 years. 3.0% of residents were under the age of 18 and 73.2% of residents were 65 years of age or older. For every 100 females there were 56.9 males, and for every 100 females age 18 and over there were 55.4 males age 18 and over.

100.0% of residents lived in urban areas, while 0.0% lived in rural areas.

There were 3,313 households in Heritage Village, of which 5.5% had children under the age of 18 living in them. Of all households, 30.8% were married-couple households, 14.7% were households with a male householder and no spouse or partner present, and 52.6% were households with a female householder and no spouse or partner present. About 58.7% of all households were made up of individuals and 49.3% had someone living alone who was 65 years of age or older.

There were 3,651 housing units, of which 9.3% were vacant. The homeowner vacancy rate was 2.5% and the rental vacancy rate was 5.6%.

Racial composition as of the 2020 census
Race	Number	Percent
White	4,857	95.4%
Black or African American	41	0.8%
American Indian and Alaska Native	2	0.0%
Asian	47	0.9%
Native Hawaiian and Other Pacific Islander	0	0.0%
Some other race	30	0.6%
Two or more races	114	2.2%
Hispanic or Latino (of any race)	117	2.3%

=== 2000 census ===
As of the 2000 census, there were 3,435 people, 2,261 households, and 976 families residing in the CDP. The population density was 1,500.8 inhabitants per square mile (579.5/km^{2}). There were 2,590 housing units at an average density of 1,131.6 per square mile (436.9/km^{2}). The racial makeup of the CDP was 99.01% White, 0.20% African American, 0.03% Native American, 0.32% Asian, 0.09% from other races, and 0.35% from two or more races. Hispanic or Latino of any race were 0.67% of the population.

There were 2,261 households, out of which 1.9% had children under the age of 18 living with them, 39.5% were married couples living together, 3.2% had a female householder with no husband present, and 56.8% were non-families. 54.6% of all households were made up of individuals, and 47.9% had someone living alone who was 65 years of age or older. The average household size was 1.52 and the average family size was 2.15. Technically, no children under 18 years are allowed to live in Heritage Village for more than 6 months out of any 12-month period.

In the CDP, the population was spread out, with 2.7% under the age of 18, 0.7% from 18 to 24, 3.2% from 25 to 44, 14.7% from 45 to 64, and 78.7% who were 65 years of age or older. The median age was 75 years. For every 100 females, there were 58.1 males. For every 100 females age 18 and over, there were 57.4 males.

The median income for a household in the CDP was $38,525, and the median income for a family was $51,714. Males had a median income of $44,261 versus $31,250 for females. The per capita income for the CDP was $30,876. About 1.8% of families and 3.1% of the population were below the poverty line, including none of those under age 18 and 2.9% of those age 65 or over.
