= Audubon Center at Bent of the River =

Nature preserve in Southbury, Connecticut, U.S.

Coordinates: 41.471984°N 73.258466°W

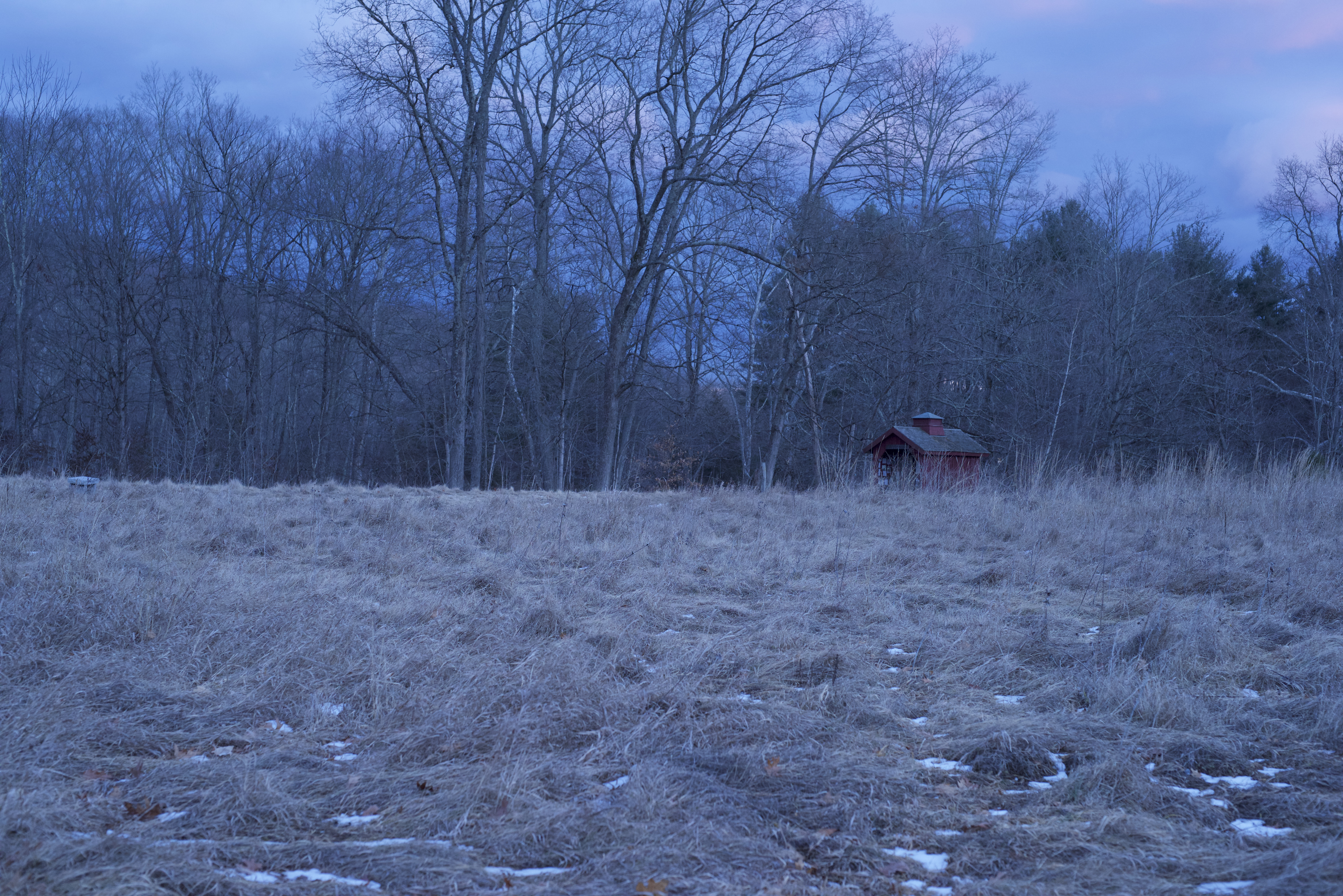
Entrance to the Audubon Society in Southbury. Dusk, 2017.

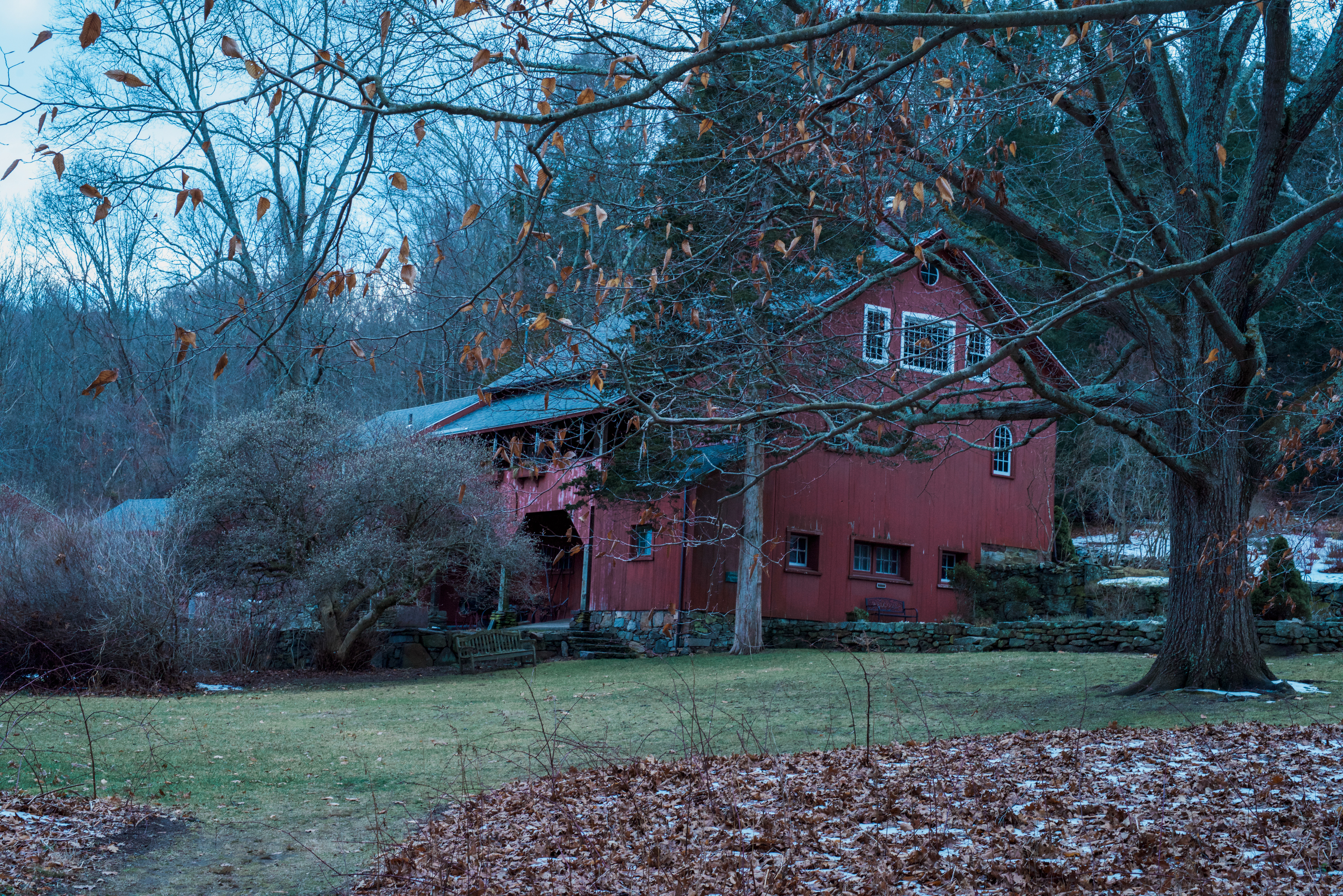
Audubon Society in Southbury

Audubon Center at Bent of the River is a 700-acre preserve in Southbury, Connecticut. It is located off South Britain Road and is open year-round from sunrise to sunset.

The Center's mission is to conserve land and promote biodiversity. Its website states, "When Mrs. Althea Clark bequeathed Bent of the River farm to National Audubon Society, she left explicit instructions about its use for education and the maintenance of the land — such as preserving it for native flora and fauna, and having no trail blazes or interpretive signs. She wanted the Bent to be kept in a state of "mild wildness."

The property features about 15 miles of trails through fields, forests, shrub, and grasslands along the Pomperaug River, and is considered to be an excellent site for bird watching. The property includes a brick house named the Clark House and a mid-19th-century barn used for nature education programs and events.
