= Regional School District 15 =

School district in Connecticut, United States

Address
- 286 Whittemore Road Middlebury, Connecticut, 06762; United States

District information
- Grades: PK-12
- Established: 1968
- Superintendent: Joshua Smith

Students and staff
- Enrollment: 3,602 (as of 2018-19)
- Teachers: 280.4 (FTE) (as of 2018-19)
- Staff: 389.44 (FTE) (as of 2018-19)
- Student–teacher ratio: 12.85 (as of 2018-19)

Other information
- Website: http://www.region15.org/

Regional School District 15 is a school district serving Middlebury and Southbury in Connecticut, USA.

== History ==
On December 16, 1968, Pomperaug Regional School District 15 was formed with Middlebury and Southbury schools.

== Schools ==
Elementary schools:

- Gainfield Elementary School
- Long Meadow Elementary School
- Middlebury Elementary School
- Pomperaug Elementary School

Middle schools:

- Memorial Middle School
- Rochambeau Middle School

High schools:

- Pomperaug High School
