= Pomperaug High School =

Pomperaug Regional High School

Location
- 234 Judd Road; Southbury, Connecticut 06488; United States; 41°30′7″N 73°09′43″W

Information
- Motto: "It's a great day to be a panther!"
- Established: 1979 (47 years ago)
- School district: Regional School District 15
- CEEB code: 070685
- Principal: Paul Jones
- Teaching staff: 88.80 (FTE)
- Grades: 9-12
- Enrollment: 995 (2023–2024)
- Student to teacher ratio: 11.20
- Colors: Red and black (primary) White and gray (secondary)
- Slogan: "It's a great day to be a panther!"
- Athletics conference: South West Conference
- Mascot: Panther
- Newspaper: The Pawprint (school-sponsored)
- Yearbook: Vestige
- Website: phs.region15.org

Pomperaug High School (PHS) is a public high school in Southbury, Connecticut. It is part of Regional School District 15 which serves Southbury in addition to Middlebury.

== History ==
Pomperaug was built in 1979 on the border between Southbury and Middlebury, the two communities which it serves. It is the only high school in Regional School District 15, and receives students who have graduated from Memorial Middle School (in Middlebury) and Rochambeau Middle School (in Southbury). Previous to the building of Pomperaug High School, the region was served by Southbury High School, the now current Rochambeau Middle School building.

On August 1, 2018, it was announced that Paul Jones would be the new principal of Pomperaug High School, filling the position that was previously held by Glenn Lungarini.

== Athletics ==
Pomperaug also has a strong athletic tradition with a number of championships. The school is a part of the South West Conference.

=== State championships ===
- Boys' Swimming: 1991, 1994, 1995, 1996, 1999, 2000, 2007, 2008, 2009, 2010, 2011, 2012, 2013, 2014, 2015, 2016, 2019, 2022, 2023, 2024, 2025
- Field Hockey: 1981, 1989, 1996, 1998, 1999, 2000, 2002, 2003, 2010
- Football: 2004
- Boys' Track: 1999
- Golf: 1998, 1999, 2013, 2022, 2023
- Boys' Cross Country: 1993, 1997, 2017
- Boys' Basketball: 1980
- Girls' Cross Country: 1988, 1989, 2010
- Softball: 1975
- Gymnastics: 2002, 2004, 2008
- Girls' Swimming: 2009, 2013, 2022, 2023, 2024
- Baseball: 2010
- Ice Hockey: 2011
- Boys Soccer: 2011
- Ski: 2020

== Notable alumni ==
- Shane Bannon (2007), drafted to the Kansas City Chiefs
- Eric Berthel (1985), Connecticut State senator
- James Ledbetter (1982), author and editor based in New York City
- Mark W. Libby (1988), United States diplomat
- John Pullman "Jake" Longstreth Jr. (1995), American painter, musician, and internet radio personality
- Jimmy "Jomboy" O’Brien (2007), founder of JomboyMedia, a sports entertainment company; content creator
- Katie Stevens (2010), from the ninth season of American Idol
- Mary Stoiana (attended, but did not graduate), professional tennis player
