= Hurley Road Historic District =

Historic district in Connecticut, United States

- U.S. National Register of Historic Places
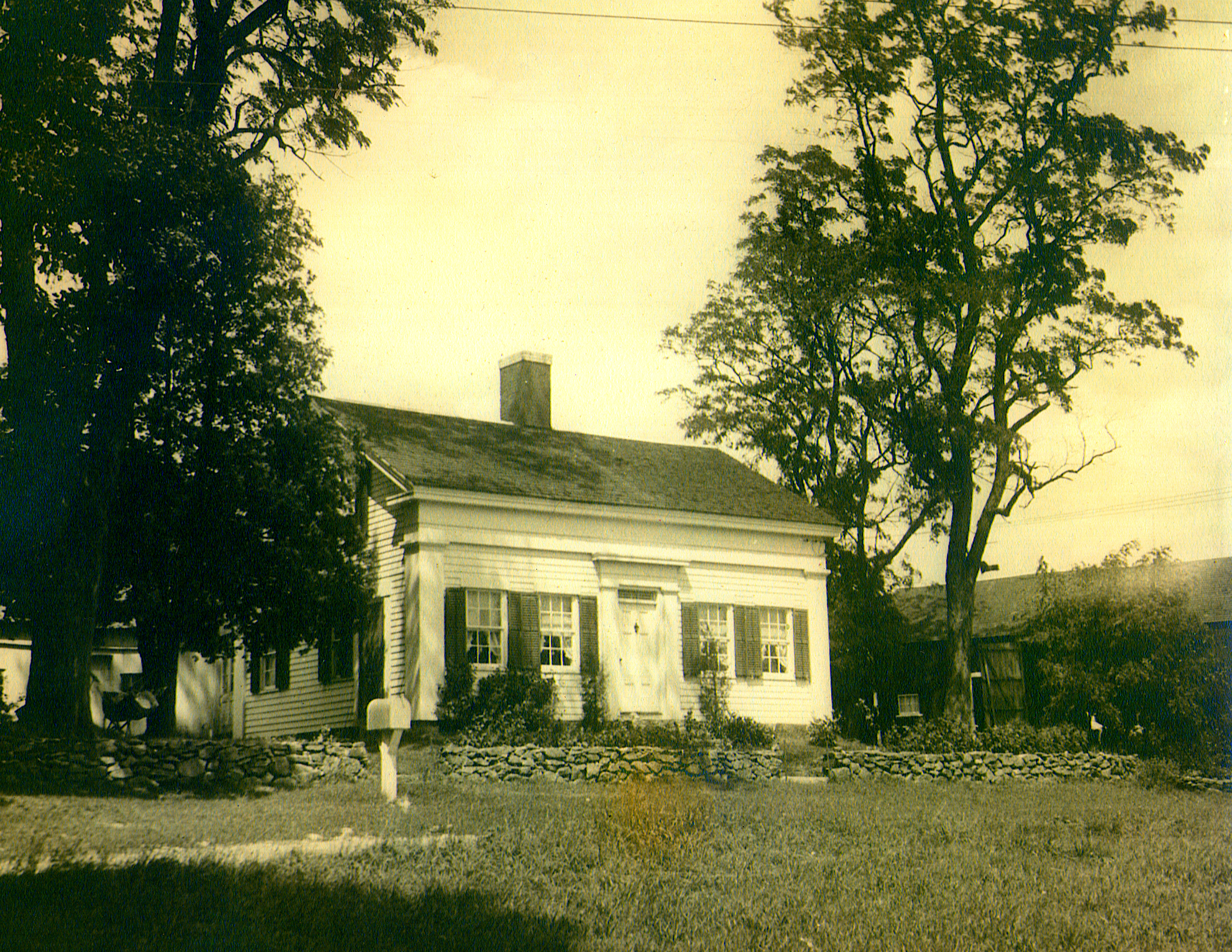

- Location within Connecticut Location within the United States
- Location: 6 and 17 Hurley Road, Southbury, Connecticut
- Coordinates: 41°28′33″N 73°9′31″W
- Area: 11.5 acres (4.7 ha)
- Built: 1820
- Architectural style: Greek Revival, Federal
- NRHP reference No.: 93000662
- Added to NRHP: July 29, 1993

The Hurley Road Historic District encompasses a pair of rural 19th-century properties built by members of a single family at 6 and 17 Hurley Road in Southbury, Connecticut. Included are Federal and Greek Revival houses, and a number of outbuildings, giving the cluster a distinct period feel. The area was listed on the National Register of Historic Places in 1993.

== Description and history ==
The Hurley Road Historic District is located in a rural setting of Southbury's Southford area, occupying about 11.5 acres (4.7 ha) centered on the junction of Strongtown and Hurley Roads. It is in this immediate vicinity that the built elements of the district are located, with land included that stretches between Strongtown Road and Eight Mile Brook, which form the district's eastern and western boundaries. Located on the north side of Hurley Road is a 1-1/2 story Greek Revival Cape, along with two barns. This property is also associated with a dam on the brook which impounds a mill pond to the north. South of Strongtown Road is a 2-1/2 story Federal style house, which is also accompanied by a 19th-century barn and a c. 1900 summer cottage.

This area was part of original grants given to Israel Curtiss when Old Woodbury (the mother town of Southbury) was divided in 1670. Two descendants of Curtiss, cousins Jason and Japhet, were responsible for construction of the two houses; the Federal style house about 1820 for Jason, and the Greek Revival Cape for Japhet about 1835. Owners and occupants of the Japhet Curtiss House were also associated with the operation of a mill (no longer standing) located across the brook in Oxford.

== See also ==
- National Register of Historic Places listings in New Haven County, Connecticut
