= Gladys Taber =

American writer (1899–1980)

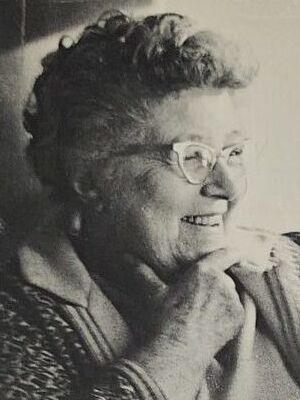
- Taber in 1969
- Born: April 12, 1899; Colorado Springs, Colorado
- Died: March 11, 1980 (aged 80); Hyannis, Massachusetts
- Resting place: Southbury, Connecticut
- Education: Wellesley College BA, Lawrence College MA
- Occupations: Author, Professor
- Spouse(s): Frank Taber, divorced 1946
- Children: Constance Taber Colby
- Relatives: Cotton Mather
- Writing career
- Notable work: “Butternut Wisdom” Stillmeadow books

Gladys Bagg Taber (1899–1980), author of 59 books, including the Stillmeadow books, and columnist for Ladies' Home Journal and Family Circle.

== Biography ==
Gladys Bagg Taber was born in Colorado Springs on April 12, 1899, and spent most of her early years moving because of her father's work as a mining engineer. She lived in New Mexico, California, Illinois and Wisconsin, and spent time on her grandfather's farm in Massachusetts. In 1920, she received a bachelor's degree from Wellesley, and an M.A. from Lawrence College in 1921. She married Frank Taber, and they had a daughter, Constance, which interrupted her academic career; then for more than 20 years, she lived in Stillmeadow, her vintage 1690 Southbury, Connecticut, farmhouse, having commuted to New York City part of the time to teach creative writing at Columbia University from 1921 to 1926. The house was jointly owned by the Tabers and their friends Eleanor and Max Mayer. Her column "Diary of Domesticity" began in the Ladies' Home Journal in November 1937; "Butternut Wisdom" ran in the Family Circle from 1959 to 1967.

Gladys Taber lived in Stillmeadow, a 1690 farmhouse off Jeremy Swamp Road in Southbury, starting in 1933 (summers only) and 1935 (full-time). She died on March 11, 1980.

== Bibliography ==
- 1925/8 Lady of the Moon
- 1929 Lyonnesse
- 1934 Late Climbs the Sun
- 1935 Tomorrow May Be Fair
- 1937 The Evergreen Tree
- 1938 Long Tails and Short
- 1938 A Star to Steer By
- 1938 This Is For Always
- 1940 Harvest at Stillmeadow
- 1944 The Heart Has April Too
- 1944 Give Us This Day
- 1944 Nurse in Blue
- 1945/9 Especially Spaniels
- 1945 Give Me the Stars
- 1946 The Family on Maple Street
- 1947/8 Flower Arranging for the American Home
- 1947/51 Stillmeadow Kitchen
- 1948 The Book of Stillmeadow
- 1948 Daisy and Dobbin, Two Little Seahorses
- 1949 Especially Father
- 1949 The First Book of Dogs
- 1950 The First Book of Cats
- 1950 Stillmeadow Seasons
- 1952 When Dogs Meet People
- 1953 Stillmeadow and Sugarbridge
- 1955 Stillmeadow Daybook
- 1957 Mrs. Daffodil
- 1958 What Cooks at Stillmeadow
- 1959 Spring Harvest
- 1959 Stillmeadow Sampler
- 1962 The Stillmeadow Road
- 1963 Another Path
- 1965 Stillmeadow Cook Book
- 1966 One Dozen and One
- 1967 Stillmeadow Calendar
- 1968 Especially Dogs
- 1969 A Book to Begin on Flower Arranging
- 1969 Stillmeadow Album
- 1970 Amber, A Very Personal Cat
- 1970 Reveries at Stillmeadow
- 1971 My Own Cape Cod
- 1972 My Own Cook Book
- 1974 Country Chronicle
- 1976 Harvest of Yesterdays
- 1976 The Best of Stillmeadow
- 1977 Letters of Inspiration
- 1978 Conversations With Amber
- 1981 Still Cove Journal
