= Plaster House =

Historic house in Connecticut, United States

- U.S. National Register of Historic Places
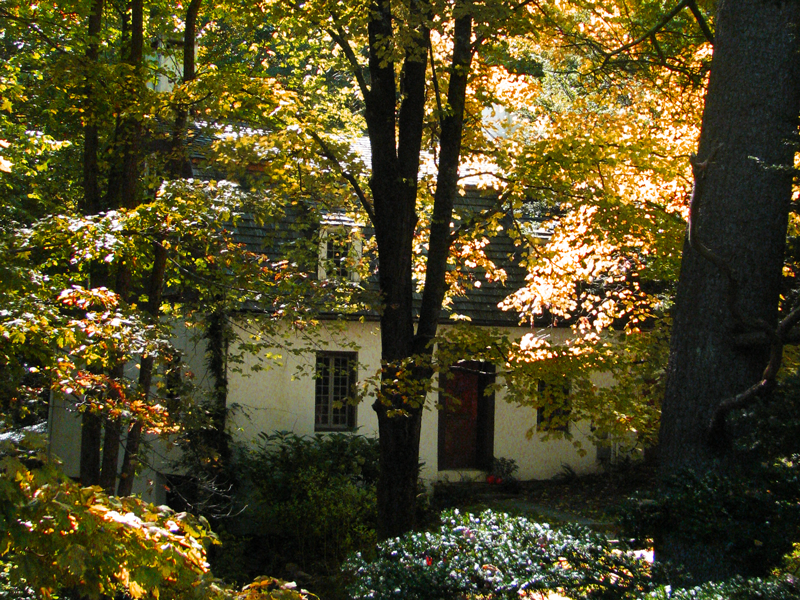

- Location within Connecticut Location within the United States
- Location: 117 Plaster House Road, Southbury, Connecticut
- Coordinates: 41°27′00″N 73°10′01″W
- Area: 9.9 acres (4.0 ha)
- Architectural style: Colonial
- NRHP reference No.: 93000660
- Added to NRHP: July 29, 1993

The Plaster House is a historic house at 117 Plaster House Road in Southbury, Connecticut. Probably built in the mid-18th century, it is an extremely rare example of 18th-century stone residential construction in the state. The small structure may have originally been built as a farm outbuilding by a member of locally prominent Hinman family. It was listed on the National Register of Historic Places in 1993.

== Description and history ==
The Plaster House is located in a rural setting of southeastern Southbury, on the south side of Plaster House Road near its western end at Jeremy Swamp Road. It is set on a parcel overlooking Jeremy Brook to the east. The house is a small 1 1/2-story masonry structure, built out of small rubblestone and covered in stucco. It has a gambrel roof pierced by two shed-roof dormers, with stone chimneys in the end walls. The main facade is three bays wide, with sash windows on either side of the entrance. The western gable is finished in stone, while the eastern one is framed in wood and finished in clapboards. The interior is divided into two chambers, with the larger one historically serving as a parlor and the smaller one as a kitchen. The stonework of the chimney and fireplaces are fully exposed, an unusual condition that appears to be original.

The house's exact construction date is unknown, but was probably no later than 1750, based on architectural evidence. Architectural historian J. Frederick Kelly assigned it a construction date of 1720, apparently without documentary evidence. The property was for many years in the hands of the Hinman family, who settled the area in the 17th century, and it is family lore that American Revolutionary War soldier Benjamin Hinman was born here. Jeremy Swamp Road, now a dirt track, was historically a major north–south route, and the property was associated with a mill whose remains are further downstream on Jeremy Brook, and whose dam makes up part of the bridge carrying Plaster House Road. The house is extremely unusual in the state due to its stone construction, which was uncommon in colonial Connecticut.

== See also ==
- National Register of Historic Places in New Haven County, Connecticut
