= William Hurd House =

Historic house in Connecticut, United States

- U.S. National Register of Historic Places
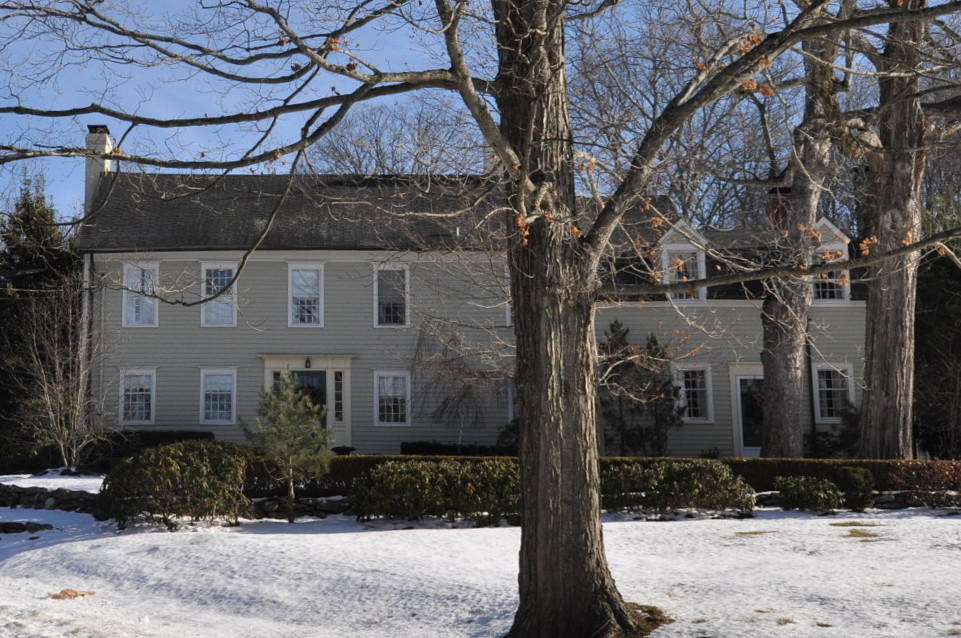

- Location within Connecticut Location within the United States
- Location: 327 Hulls Hill Road, Southbury, Connecticut
- Coordinates: 41°27′25″N 73°10′29″W
- Area: 5.1 acres (2.1 ha)
- Architectural style: Federal
- NRHP reference No.: 93000659
- Added to NRHP: July 29, 1993

The William Hurd House is a historic house at 327 Hulls Hill Road in Southbury, Connecticut. Built in the late 18th century and enlarged about 1820, it is a good local example of Federal period architecture, with well-preserved outbuildings. It was listed on the National Register of Historic Places in 1993.

== Description and history ==
The William Hurd House is located in a rural-residential setting in Southbury's Southford area, on the south side of Hulls Hill Road just north of its crossing of Jeremy Brook. It is a 2 1/2-story wood-frame structure, with a gabled roof, end chimneys, and clapboarded exterior, with ells extending to the right and rear. The main facade is five bays wide, with windows arranged in a somewhat asymmetrical manner around a nearly centered entrance. The entry has a fine Federal surround, with sidelights that have pilasters on both sides, and a corniced entablature. The interior of the main block is largely a reconstruction performed after a 1950 fire, but cased timbers attest to its age and construction history.

The oldest portion of the house was probably built in the late 18th century by William Hurd, a sixth-generation descendant of an early settler of the area. It was enlarged about 1820, at which time it was given its Federal period features. It was sold out of the Hurd family in 1834. In the 1920s it was turned into a country house and underwent some restoration, which turned it a more complete reconstruction of the interior after the 1950 fire. The house is believed to be one of the oldest in Southbury, predating the town's incorporation.

== See also ==
- National Register of Historic Places listings in New Haven County, Connecticut
