= Reuben Curtiss House =

Historic house in Connecticut, United States

- U.S. National Register of Historic Places
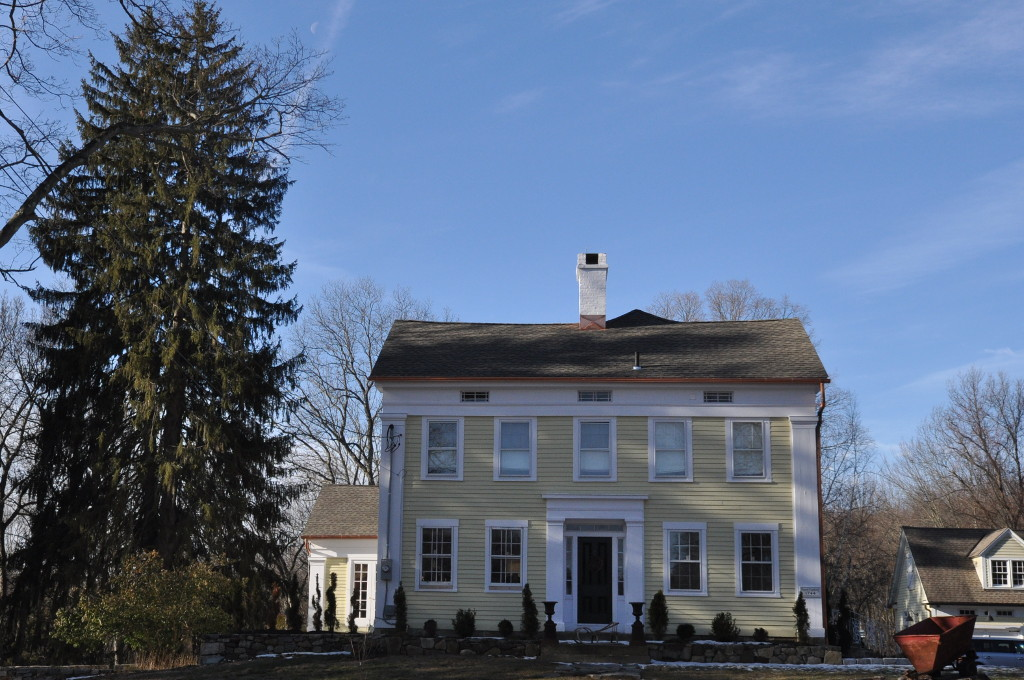

- Location within Connecticut Location within the United States
- Location: 1770 Bucks Hill Road, Southbury, Connecticut
- Coordinates: 41°28′33″N 73°10′11″W
- Area: 6.7 acres (2.7 ha)
- Built: 1840
- Architectural style: Colonial Revival, Greek Revival
- NRHP reference No.: 93000658
- Added to NRHP: July 29, 1993

The Reuben Curtiss House is a historic house at 1770 Bucks Hill Road in Southbury, Connecticut, United States. With a construction and alteration history dating from the late 18th to 20th centuries, the house is one of Southbury's finest examples of residential Greek Revival architecture. It was listed on the National Register of Historic Places in 1993.

== Description and history ==
The Reuben Curtiss House is located in a rural-suburban setting east of the center of Southbury, on the west side of Bucks Hill Road south of Luther Drive. It is a 2 1/2-story wood-frame structure, with a gabled roof, central chimney, and clapboarded exterior. A series of ells extend the building to the rear. The front facade is five bays wide, with broad corner pilasters rising to an entablature and frieze containing embedded small attic windows. The main entrance is at the center of the facade, set in a recess with sidelight windows; the recess is framed by pilasters and a corniced entablature. The rear sections of the house are finished in a combination of Colonial and Greek Revival elements that blend with the features of the main block. The interior of the house is finished in a variety of styles, reflecting the building's long life and a variety of uses.

The exact construction date of the house's oldest portion is not known with certainty. The land on which it stands was occupied by the Curtiss family in the first half of the 18th century, and a house is known to have stood here, or near here, in 1740. Architectural evidence suggests that the upper 1 1/2 stories of the main block were built in the late 18th century, probably by Reuben Curtiss. The main block's present appearance and Greek Revival features date to about 1840, when that structure was raised and a new first floor built underneath it. Between 1840 and 1866, another Reuben Curtiss operated a school for boys on the property.

== See also ==
- National Register of Historic Places listings in New Haven County, Connecticut
