= Sanford Road Historic District =

- U.S. National Register of Historic Places
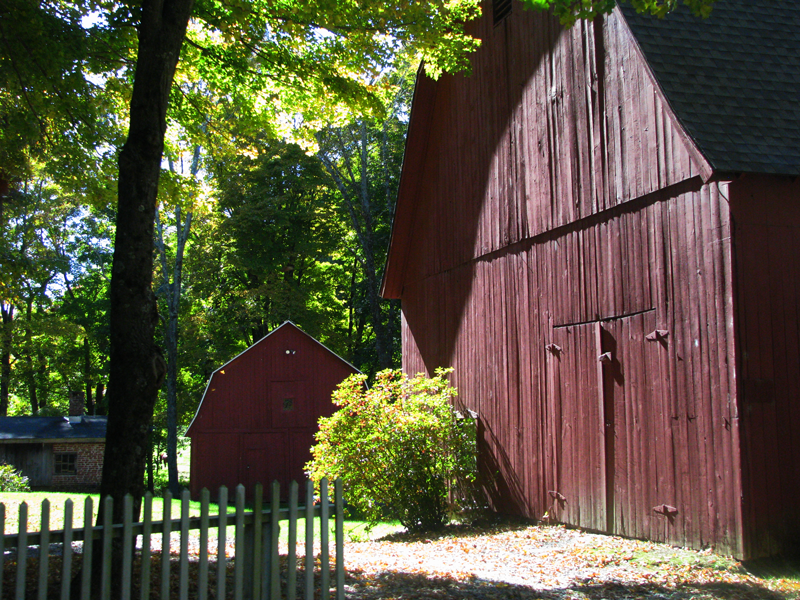
- Barns at 480 Sanford Road

- Location within Connecticut Location within the United States
- Location: 480 Sanford Road, Southbury, Connecticut
- Coordinates: 41°27′41″N 73°11′5″W
- Area: 11.2 acres (4.5 ha)
- Built: 1785
- Architectural style: Colonial
- NRHP reference No.: 93000657
- Added to NRHP: July 29, 1993

The Sanford Road Historic District encompasses a small cluster of late 18th and early 19th-century farmsteads at 480 Sanford Road in Southbury, Connecticut. The two farmhouses on the property are both associated with the locally prominent Stiles family, and typify Southbury's rural architecture of the period. The district was listed on the National Register of Historic Places in 1993.

== Description and history ==
Sanford Road runs between Jeremy Swamp Road and Jacob Road in a rural part of southeastern Southbury. The historic district encompasses 11.2 acres (4.5 ha) of land on both sides of the road between Jeremy Swamp Road and Jeremy Brook. Its principal features are two farmhouses, one on each side of the road. To the north stands the house of Ephraim Stiles, built in 1786. It is a 1-1/2 story Cape style house, with a gabled roof, central chimney, and clapboarded exterior. Its main facade is simply trimmed with pairs of sash windows on either side of the center entrance. The interior follows a plan typical for rural Southbury houses, with a staircase behind the chimney providing access to the upper level. Across the street stands the Benjamin Osborne House, built in the early 19th century for Stiles' son-in-law and daughter. It is a four-bay Cape, with its off-center entrance sheltered by a Colonial Revival hip-roofed portico. Also surviving on this property are several early 20th-century farm outbuildings.

Land in this area was acquired about 1750 by Benjamin Stiles, grandfather to Ephraim. Benjamin was one of the first lawyers to come to the area (then part of Woodbury). Benjamin Osborne, who married two of Ephraim Stiles' daughters, was also prominent in local affairs, serving in the state legislature. Both properties were sold out of the Stiles and Osborne families before 1850.
