= Ralph Dunning Smyth =

American judge and politician (1804–1874)

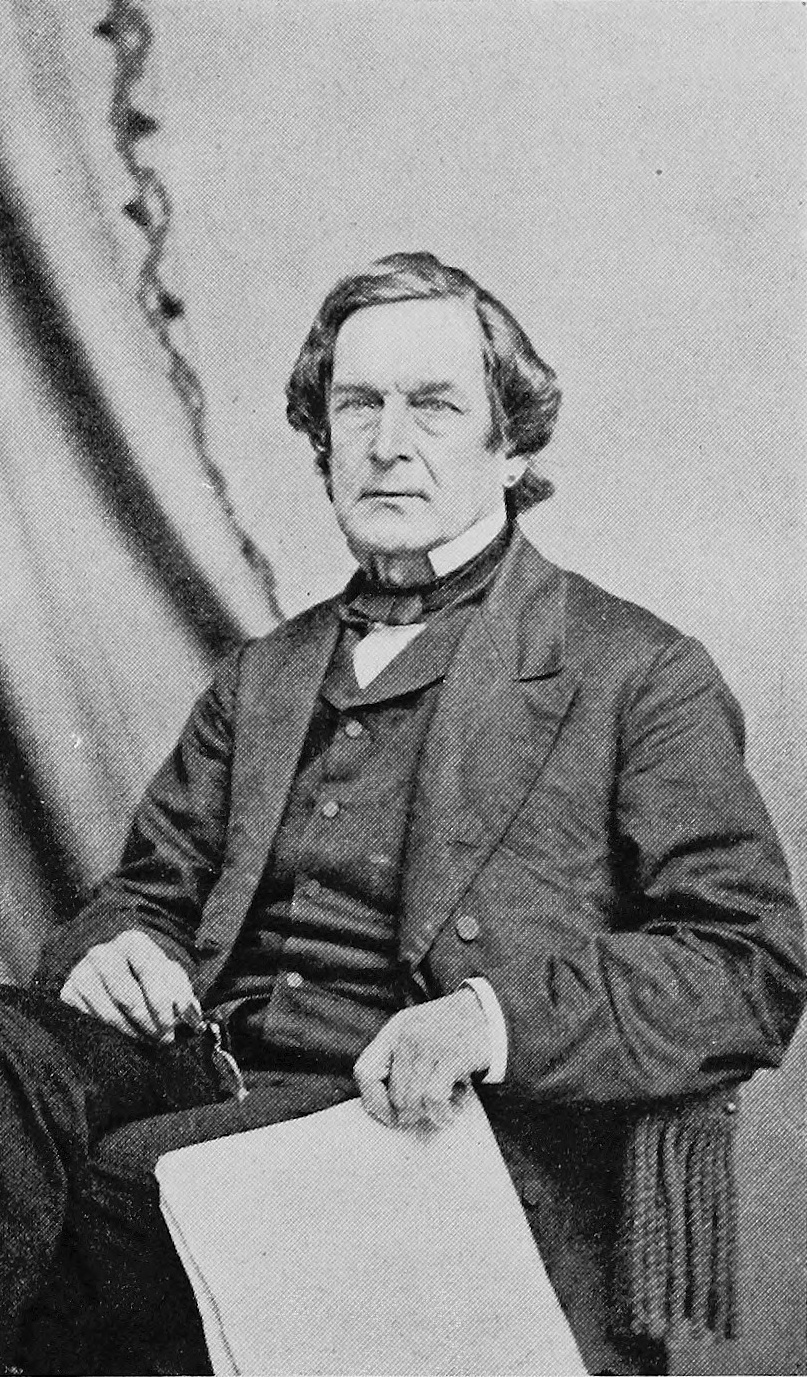
Ralph Dunning Smith

Ralph Dunning Smyth (October 24, 1804 – September 11, 1874) was an American judge and politician.

Smyth was born in Southbury, Connecticut on October 24, 1804. He was the son of Richard and Lovine (Hebert) Smith. He was fitted for college under John H. Lathrop, at the Weston (now Easton) Academy.

He graduated from Yale College in 1827. On the completion of his collegiate course he began the study of law with Hon. Edward Hinman, of Southbury, and Heman Birch, Esq, of Brookfield, finishing his course in the Yale Law School, then under the care of Judges David Daggett and Samuel Johnson Hitchcock. He was admitted to the bar in 1831, and immediately settled in Guilford, Conn., where he spent the rest of his life. In January 1844, he was appointed judge of the Probate Court. In 1859 he represented his adopted town in the Connecticut General Assembly. From 1848 to 1854, he was engaged in chartering, constructing, and conducting the New Haven and New London, and the New London and Stonington railroads. He earned the reputation of a thorough office-lawyer, conscientious in the performance of his professional duties. His favorite outside studies were in the departments of history and genealogy, and of English literature. His collection, in manuscript, of genealogies of the families of Guilford, and of their ramifications in the Connecticut Valley, is very large and valuable. The lives of the early graduates of Yale also claimed much of his spare time, and he left in manuscript a series of more or less complete biographical sketches of these, from the beginning to the class of 1767. The sketches of the graduates of the first eight years were printed in the College Courant in 1868.

During the spring of 1874, he began to lay aside his favorite pursuits, retaining, however, to the last, his ardent attachment to Yale, whose Commencement exercises he attended in June. After this date, his health began to fail rapidly, until death released him from his sufferings, September 11, 1874. Smyth was married, October 13, 1837, to Rachel S., daughter of Amos Seward, of Guilford, who, with a married daughter, survived him. Their two sons, graduates of Yale in 1863 and 1866, died in 1863 and 1868.
