= Manny Santos =

Manny Santos may refer to:

- Manny Santos (Degrassi: The Next Generation), a character on Degrassi: The Next Generation
- Manny Santos (boxer) (1943–2013), Tongan-born New Zealand boxer
- Manny Santos (weightlifter) (1935–2020), Australian Olympic weightlifter
