= Southford Falls State Park =

State park in New Haven County, Connecticut

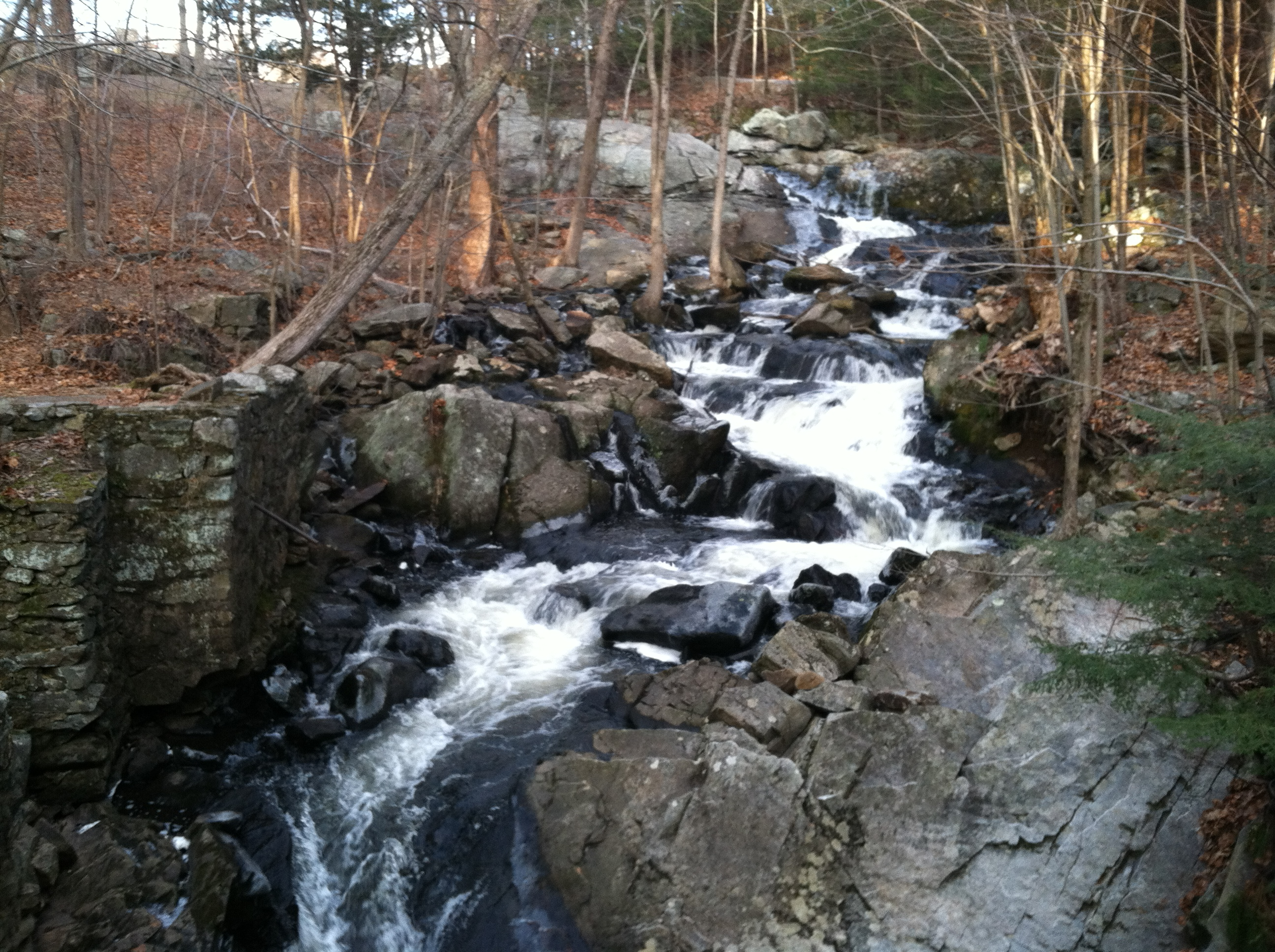
- Eight Mile Brook

- Location within Connecticut Location within the United States
- Location: Oxford and Southbury, Connecticut, United States
- Coordinates: 41°27′28″N 73°09′43″W
- Area: 169 acres (68 ha)
- Elevation: 476 ft (145 m)
- Established: 1932
- Administrator: Connecticut Department of Energy and Environmental Protection
- Designation: Connecticut state park
- Website: Official website

Southford Falls State Park is a public recreation area covering 169 acres (68 ha) in the towns of Oxford and Southbury, Connecticut. The state park offers fishing, hiking, waterfalls, a fire tower, and a covered bridge over Eight Mile Brook. It is managed by the Connecticut Department of Energy and Environmental Protection.

== History ==
The fast flowing waters of Eight Mile Brook as it drops steeply from Lake Quassapaug to the Housatonic River provided power for an early industrial complex, which at one time included gristmills, sawmills, and the shops of iron workers, button makers, knife makers, clothiers and other skilled tradesmen. Evidence in the channel suggests that man-made improvements were introduced to strengthen the river's flow. At the turn of the 20th century, the Diamond Match Company bought up the site and built a factory for the manufacture of cardboard matchboxes. After the factory burned down for a second time, the site was ceded to the state in 1927. The state park was established in 1932.

== Activities and amenities ==
The park's recreational features include hiking trails, picnicking facilities, winter sports, field sports, and fishing. It is a designated Trout Park, regularly stocked with trout from the state's fish hatcheries.
