= Aaron Bronson House =

Historic house in Connecticut, United States

- U.S. National Register of Historic Places
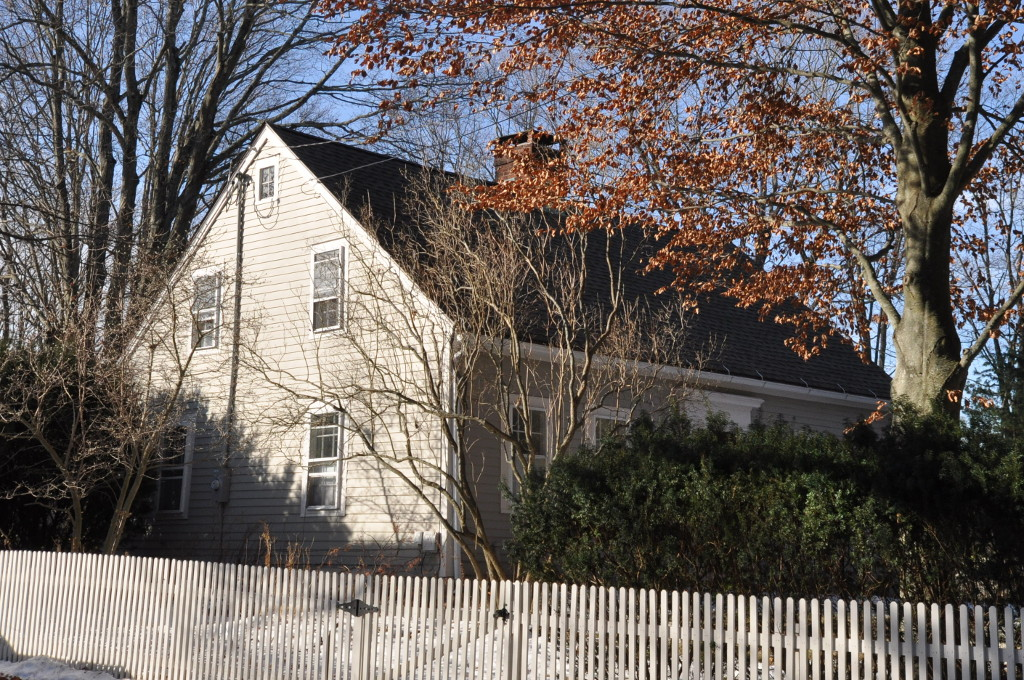

- Location within Connecticut Location within the United States
- Location: 846 Southford Road, Southbury, Connecticut
- Coordinates: 41°28′17″N 73°10′58″W
- Area: 5.4 acres (2.2 ha)
- Built: 1785
- Architectural style: Colonial
- NRHP reference No.: 93000656
- Added to NRHP: July 29, 1993

The Aaron Bronson House is a historic house at 846 Southford Road CT 67 in Southbury, Connecticut. Built in around the year 1785, it is a good local example of a Colonial-style Cape, noted for its particularly fine and well-preserved interior. It was listed on the National Register of Historic Places in 1993.

== Description and history ==
The Aaron Bronson House stands on the South Side of Southford Road (CT 67), Southeast of Southbury's village center. Its main block is a 1 1/2-story wood-frame structure, with a central chimney and clapboarded exterior. A 19th-century ell extends to the rear, with a second, more modern ell, attached to it. The main facade is five bays wide, and is minimally adorned with just a Greek Revival entrance surround. The interior retains virtually all of its original Federal-style finishes, including paneled and pilastered fireplace surrounds, beaded moulding, and builtin cabinetry.

The early history of this house is not known in great detail; it was most likely built about 1785, based on its traditional Colonial form and early Federal period interior. The property was associated for many years with the locally prominent Bronson family, who were early colonial settlers of the region. Aaron Bronson, who was known to own it in the early 19th century, was a successful cordwainer (shoemaker) and buttonmaker, who left a substantial estate on his death in 1835. His son, Augustus, sold the house out of the family in 1847.

== See also ==
- National Register of Historic Places listings in New Haven County, Connecticut
