= Southbury, Connecticut =

- Town
- Town of Southbury
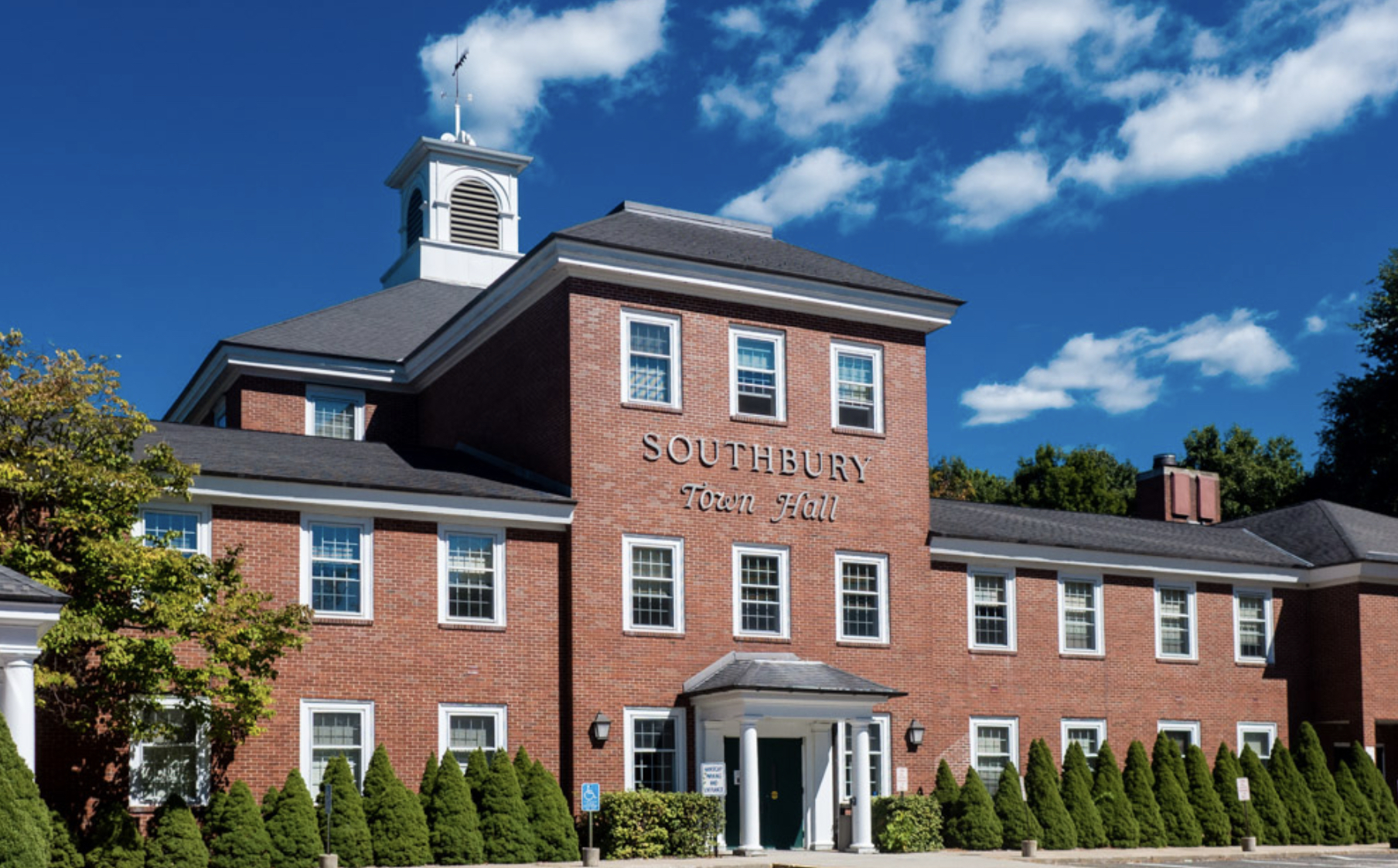
- Southbury Town Hall

- Seal

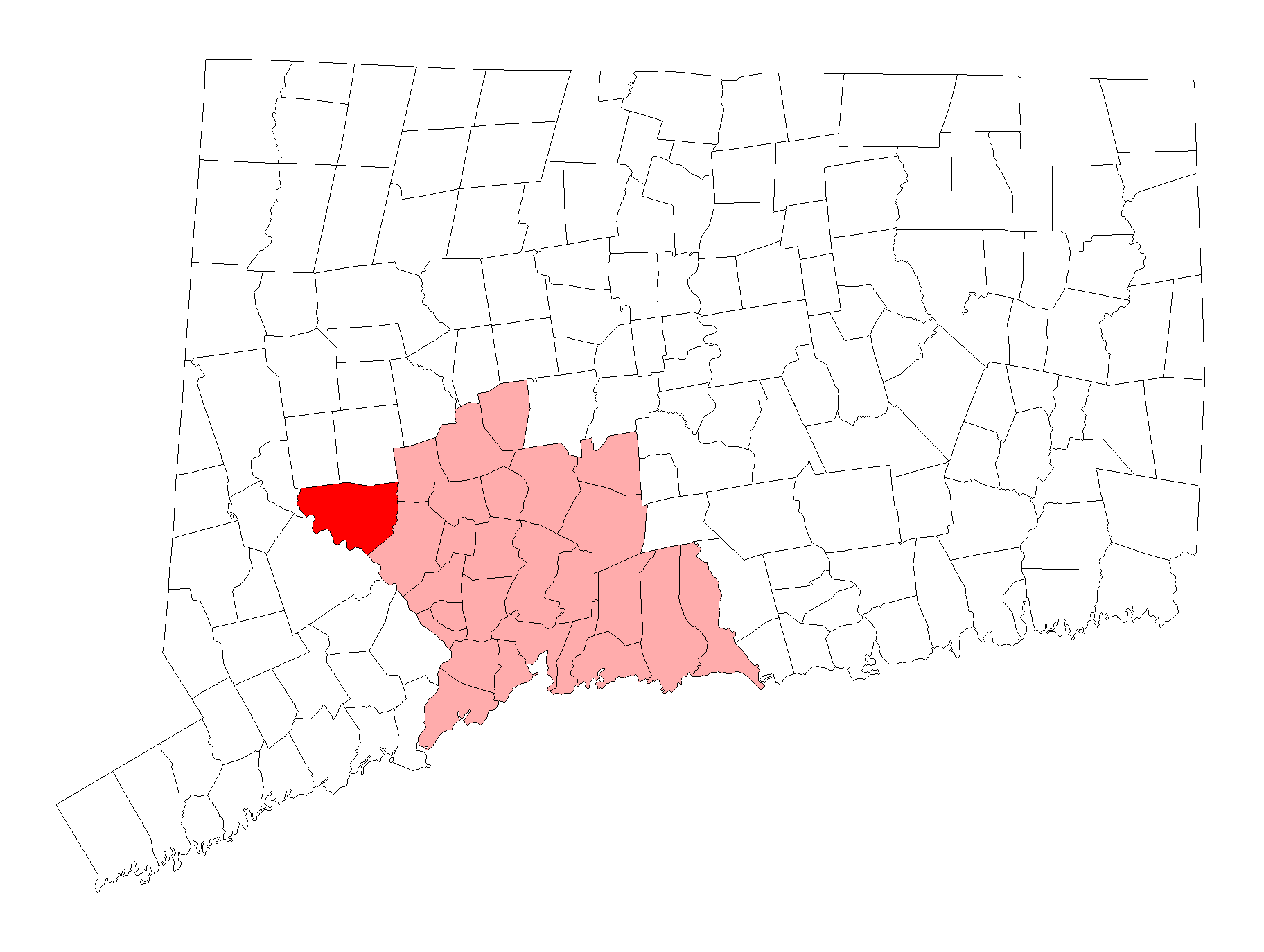
- Coordinates: 41°28′25″N 73°14′03″W
- Country: United States
- State: Connecticut
- County: New Haven
- Region: Naugatuck Valley
- Incorporated: 1787

Government
  - Type: Selectman-town meeting
  - First selectman: Tim O’Neil (D)
  - Selectmen: Jason Van Stone (R); Cathy De Carli (D); Kelly Keenan (D); Wendy Bernard (D); Holly Sullivan (R)

Area
  - Total: 40.1 sq mi (103.8 km^{2})
  - Land: 39.0 sq mi (101.0 km^{2})
  - Water: 1.1 sq mi (2.8 km^{2})
- Elevation: 335 ft (102 m)

Population (2020)
  - Total: 19,879
  - Density: 509.8/sq mi (196.8/km^{2})
- Time zone: UTC−5 (Eastern)
  - Summer (DST): UTC−4 (Eastern)
- ZIP code: 06488
- Area codes: 203/475
- FIPS code: 09-69640
- GNIS feature ID: 0213507
- Website: www.southbury-ct.org

Southbury is a town in western New Haven County, Connecticut, United States. It is north of Oxford and Newtown, and east of Brookfield. Its population was 19,879 at the 2020 census. The town is part of the Naugatuck Valley Planning Region.

Southbury comprises sprawling rural country areas, suburban neighborhoods, and historic districts. It is a short distance from major business and commercial centers. It is 67 miles (107 km) north of New York City, and 34 miles (54 km) west of Hartford.

Southbury is the only community in the country with the name "Southbury", which is why the town seal reads Unica Unaque, meaning "The One and Only."

== History ==
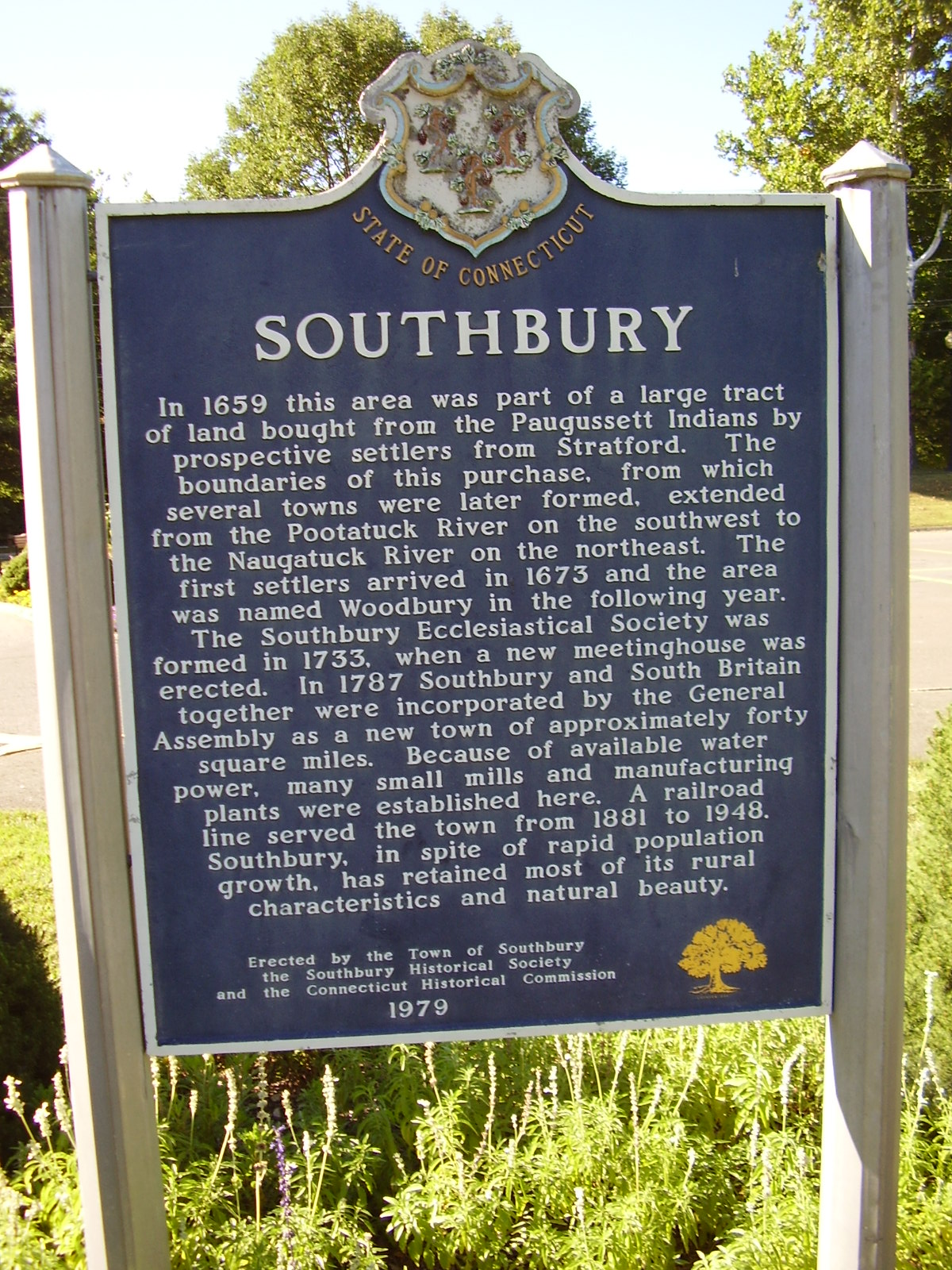
Town historical sign on Main Street South

The town of Southbury was one of several towns formed out of parcels of land purchased from the Pootatuck Native Americans. Southbury was originally part of Woodbury, which was settled in 1673. A meetinghouse for the Southbury Ecclesiastical Society was built in 1733, and in 1787 the town of Southbury was incorporated. After two decades within Litchfield County, Southbury was transferred to New Haven County in 1807.

In the 1800s, water power became essential to the growth of Southbury's industries, which included mills, tanneries, and distilleries. The power for these industries came primarily from the Pomperaug River and the Housatonic River. As the industrial revolution progressed, many of these businesses left for Waterbury.

In the 1920s, Russian expatriates Count Ilya Tolstoy (son of the author Leo Tolstoy) and George Grebenstchikoff founded an artists' colony at one end of Main Street, known as Churaevka (or "Russian Village"). At its peak, Churaevka had a printing press used by Russian and Ukrainian scholars and novelists. Visitors to the colony included the composer Sergei Rachmaninoff. Most of its immigrant population is now gone; however, St. Sergius Chapel, designed by Nicholas Roerich and built in 1932–1933, remains. Churaevka is listed on the National Register of Historic Places.

In November 1937, residents of the farming outpost got word that a man by the name of Wolfgang Jung had purchased 178 acres (0.72 km^{2}) in the town. Residents looking into his plans discovered that he was a member of the German American Bund, an organization of ethnic Germans living in the United States who supported Adolf Hitler and Nazi Germany. Its leader, Fritz Kuhn, was considered the leading anti-Semite in the country. Word soon got out that they were, in fact, planning to build their largest training facility in the country. Residents objected by calling a town meeting and set up a zoning department with one simple rule, no military activity excluding the United States Army. The law was adopted December 14 and the Bund stopped work and eventually sold the land.

Southbury was a rural farming town for most of its history. However, with the development of the Interstate Highway System, that changed. With the opening of Interstate 84 through Southbury by 1963, the town gained easy access to New York and Hartford, also improving its access to Danbury and Waterbury. Heritage Village opened in 1967, on a 1,000-acre (4.0 km^{2}) site. In 1987, IBM built an extensive office and research building in Southbury, employing over 2,500 workers. Southbury transitioned from a primarily rural community into the varied town it is today, with the commercial downtown and residential neighborhoods sharing the town with farming communities and extended rural acreage. Today, Southbury has approximately 17% open space, with a goal of 20%.

In the early 1990s, Southbury was the subject of a lawsuit by the Golden Hill Paugussett Indian Nation. The 100-member tribe sought to take the land of roughly 1,200 property holders in the town. The lawsuit was thrown out in 1993 based on the fact that the man who brought the suit was not a chieftain, contrary to his claims, and had no standing to bring the suit.

== Geography ==
According to the US Census Bureau, Southbury has a total area of 40.1 square miles (103.8 km^{2}), of which 39.0 square miles (101.0 km^{2}) is land and 1.1 square miles (2.8 km^{2}), or 2.69%, is water.

Towns that border Southbury are Middlebury to the northeast, Oxford to the east and southeast, Newtown to the southwest, Bridgewater to the west, and Roxbury and Woodbury to the north.

South Britain and Southford are included in the incorporated township of Southbury.

== Demographics ==
Historical population
Year	Pop.	±%
1800	1,757	—
1850	1,484	−15.5%
1900	1,238	−16.6%
1950	3,828	+209.2%
1960	5,186	+35.5%
1970	7,852	+51.4%
1980	14,156	+80.3%
1990	15,818	+11.7%
2000	18,567	+17.4%
2010	19,904	+7.2%
2020	19,879	−0.1%

As of the 2000 census, there were 18,567 people comprising 7,225 households, including 4,833 families residing in Southbury. The population density was 475.4 inhabitants per square mile (183.6/km^{2}). There were 7,799 housing units at an average density of 199.7 per square mile (77.1/km^{2}). The racial makeup of the town was 97.34% White, 0.45% African American, 0.08% Native American, 1.15% Asian, 0.01% Pacific Islander, 0.35% from other races, and 0.62% from multiple races. Hispanic or Latino of any race were 1.59% of the population.

Of Southbury's 7,225 households, 29.0% had children under the age of 18 living with them, 59.8% were married couples living together, 5.4% had a female householder with no husband present, and 33.1% were non-families. About 29.8% of all households were made up of individuals, and 21.4% had someone living alone who was 65 or older. The average household size was 2.41, and the average family size was 3.02.

Southbury's population consisted of 22.8% under the age of 18, 3.3% from 18 to 24, 22.7% from 25 to 44, 25.1% from 45 to 64, and 26.1% who were 65 or older. The median age was 46 years. For every 100 females, there were 86.9 males. For every 100 females age 18 and over, there were 82.3 males.

The median income for a household in Southbury is $75,970 in 2007, compared to $61,919 in 1999; the median income for a family in 1999 was $81,109. In 1999, males had a median income of $87,365 versus $68,657 for females. The per capita income for the town was $62,731. About 1.9% of families and 4.9% of the population were below the poverty line, including 2.3% of those under age 18 and 5.0% of those 65 or over. The median home value was $532,650.

In July 2008, it was estimated that there were 19,702 (+6.1% from 2000) people in Southbury. The estimated median household income was $75,970 (+22.7% from 2000). The estimated median home (or condominium) value was to $374,178 (+92.6% from 2000).

=== Heritage Village ===
Southbury is home to a variety of retirement facilities, including Heritage Village, one of New England's largest retirement communities. Heritage Village sits on 1,000 acres (4.0 km^{2}) and includes approximately 2,580 homes with 4,000 people. It is billed as being an "active retirement" community, offering many activities. Heritage Village was planned in the 1960s, as I-84 was completed in the area. Potential Heritage Village residents must be 55 years of age or older.

By 2013, about 30% of the population of Southbury is expected to be 60 years of age or older. By 2020, about 40% will be 60 or older. Southbury has developed a three-phase plan to increase services for the aging population. The former Southbury Library was converted into a senior center; it also houses the new home of the area Parks & Recreations Department.

In addition to the "active living" area of Heritage Village, Southbury contains several "assisted living facilities", including:

- The Hearth at Southbury
- Lutheran Home of Southbury
- River Glen Health Care Center

Other "active senior living" options that provide independent living, assisted living, and memory care in Southbury includes:

- Pomperaug Woods
- Watermark at East Hill

== Government and voting ==
The Board of Selectmen serves as the town's legislative and executive governing body, with the First Selectman serving as the town's chief executive and administrative officer. The Town Meeting is convened for certain matters specified by the town charter, including major appropriations, borrowing, and other matters deemed sufficiently important by the Board of Selectmen. The annual budget is discussed at the Town Meeting and subsequently submitted to voters for approval by referendum.

Southbury has a six-member Board of Selectmen, including First Selectman Tim O'Neil (D).

=== Voting results for Connecticut and federal elected officials ===
In 2006, veteran U.S. House Representative Nancy Johnson was ousted in favor of Democrat Chris Murphy, who carried Southbury, 51–49%. Junior U.S. Senator Joseph Lieberman dropped his Democratic party affiliation, but was re-elected as an independent, carrying Southbury with 57% of the vote; his closest opponent, Democrat Ned Lamont, had only 32% of Southbury's support.

In 2010, Southbury voted in favor of Republican candidates Tom Foley for Governor and Linda McMahon for U.S. Senate. Though neither of the Republicans won statewide, they carried Southbury with 61% and 56% of the vote, respectively. Southbury again supported the Republican for U.S. House, voting for Sam Caligiuri over the Democrat Murphy by a 56–44% margin.

In 2014, Southbury again favored Republican candidates, supporting over Democratic incumbent Dannel Malloy for Governor by 60–40% and Republican Mark Greenberg over Democratic incumbent Elizabeth Esty for U.S. House by 52–46%.

In 2016, Republican Dan Carter narrowly carried Southbury over Democratic incumbent Richard Blumenthal in the U.S. Senate race, although Blumenthal was re-elected statewide.

In 2018, Southbury supported Republican Bob Stefanowski over Democrat Ned Lamont for Governor, 59–41%, and Republican Matthew Corey over Democratic incumbent Chris Murphy for U.S. Senate, 52–48%. In the U.S. House, Republican Manny Santos carried the town over Democratic nominee Jahana Hayes, 51–49%.

In 2020, Southbury continued to favor Republicans in congressional races, with Republican David X. Sullivan defeating Hayes 52–47% for U.S. House and Republican Eric Berthel defeating Democrat Jeffrey Desmarais 53–47% for Connecticut Senate.

In 2022, Southbury again supported Republican candidates in statewide and congressional races. Republican Bob Stefanowski defeated Lamont in the town's gubernatorial race, 51–49%, while Republican Leora Levy defeated incumbent Blumenthal for U.S. Senate, 51–49%. Republican George Logan defeated Hayes for U.S. House, 52–47%.

In 2024, Southbury supported Democratic incumbent Chris Murphy over Republican Matthew Corey for U.S. Senate, 51–49%, while Republican George Logan defeated Democratic incumbent Jahana Hayes for U.S. House, 51–49%.

=== State & federal elected officials ===
Current Federal Elected Officials for U.S. Congress:

- U.S. Senators: Chris Murphy, Richard Blumenthal
- U.S. Congressman: Jahana Hayes

Current State Elected Officials for Connecticut General Assembly

- State Senator: Eric Berthel (32)
- State Representatives: Jason Buchsbaum (69), Arnold Jensen (131)

=== Registration and voting statistics ===
Southbury town vote by party in presidential elections
Year	Democratic	Republican	Third Parties
2024	49.71% 6,341	48.74% 6,217	1.55% 198
2020	50.58% 6,570	48.19% 6,260	1.23% 155
2016	43.35% 5,013	52.75% 6,100	3.90% 450
2012	44.10% 4,936	54.80% 6,134	1.10% 123
2008	46.44% 5,458	52.52% 6,172	1.04% 122
2004	41.92% 4,830	56.66% 6,528	1.42% 164
2000	41.78% 4,306	53.14% 5,477	5.08% 523
1996	39.64% 3,741	50.20% 4,737	10.16% 959

Voter registration and party enrollment as of October 17, 2025
Party	Active voters	Inactive voters	Total voters	Percentage
Republican	4,759	303	5,062	31.24%
Democratic	4,010	284	4,294	26.50%
Unaffiliated	6,103	471	6,574	40.57%
Minor parties	251	22	273	1.68%
Total	15,123	1,080	16,203	100%

== Education ==
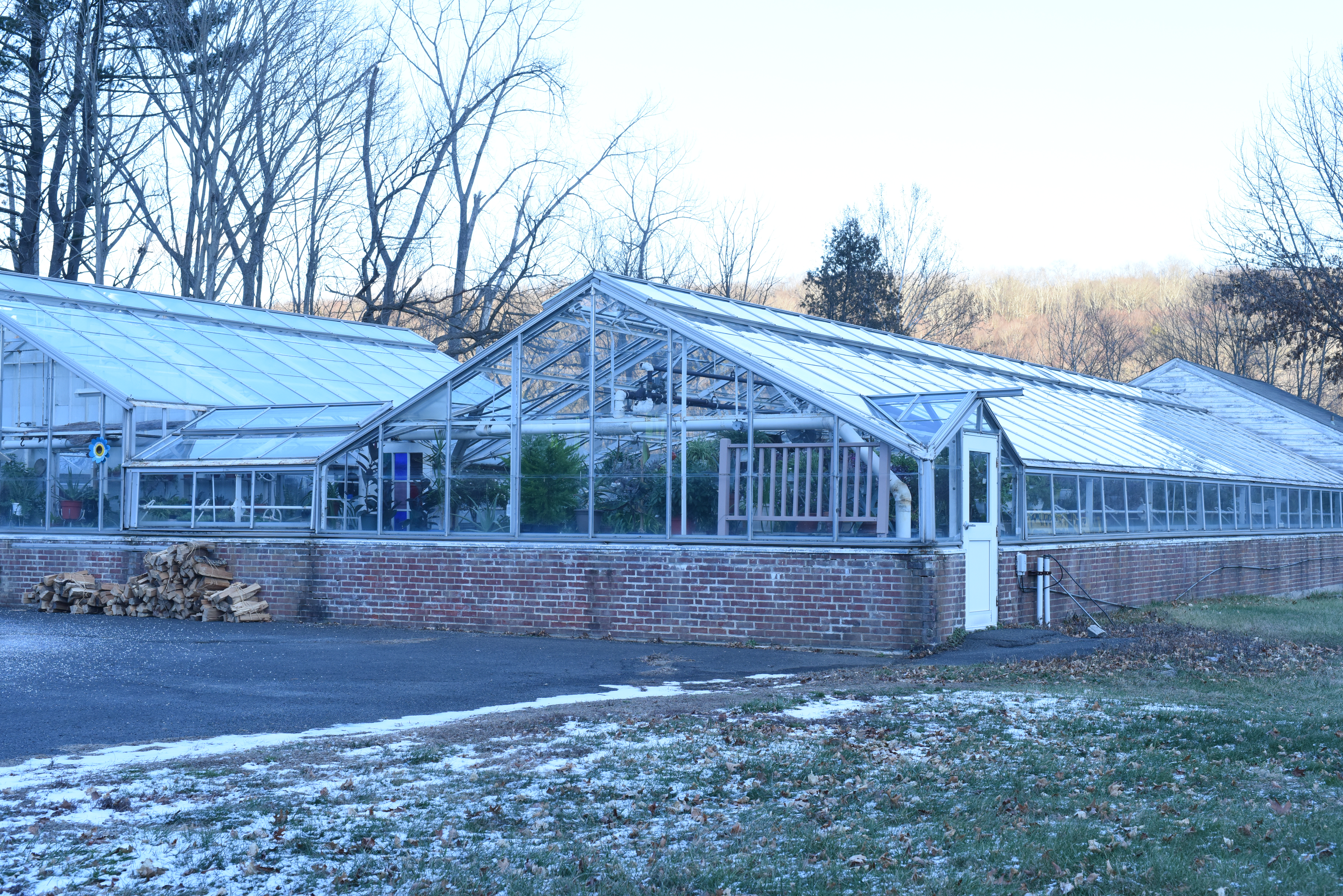
Southbury Training School greenhouse

Southbury is part of the Pomperaug Regional School District, Region 15, a school system that includes the towns of Southbury and Middlebury. The system contains four elementary, two middle and one high school.

There has been a debate between the two towns over the amount each pays towards the system.

Schools located in Southbury include:

- Gainfield Elementary School
- Pomperaug Elementary School
- Rochambeau Middle School
- Pomperaug High School

Students from Region 15 also have the option to attend:

- W.F. Kaynor Technical High School (Waterbury)
- Henry Abbott Technical High School (Danbury)
- Nonnewaug High School (Region 14, Woodbury, accessible as an agricultural school for Region 15 students)

== Recreation ==
The Southbury Parks & Recreations Department moved into the old Southbury Library in 2007. Southbury town sports include:

- Babe Ruth/Cal Ripken baseball
- Basketball
- Pop Warner football
- Soccer
- Lacrosse

Controversy has arisen over town sports since the Parks and Recreation Department began enforcing a policy banning out-of-town players from participating in town-sanctioned sports in 2006. This policy stems from the fact of overcrowding at town fields, a problem which is plaguing Southbury.

== Local media ==
- Waterbury Republican-American – A Waterbury-based independent daily newspaper
- The Danbury News-Times – A Danbury-based daily newspaper
- Voices – A local newspaper serving Southbury, Middlebury, Oxford, Seymour, Naugatuck, Woodbury, Bethlehem, New Preston, Washington, Washington Depot, Roxbury, Bridgewater, Monroe, Sandy Hook, and Newtown
- WTCH – A local student & staff run television station broadcast by Pomperaug High School in Southbury. Channel 17 in Southbury, Channel 16 in Middlebury.

== Infrastructure ==
Only a small area of Southbury is covered by water or sewer systems, with the vast majority left to wells and septic. Southbury is generally concerned with its water table, to the point where the only car wash in town is required to recycle all of their water used, an expensive process.

The town water provider is Aquarion. The gas provider is Yankee Gas Company. The cable (TV, internet, and, phone) provider is Charter Communications. The electric provider is Eversource Energy (a Northeast Utilities Company). The phone provider (POTS & DSL) is Frontier Communications.

== Notable features ==
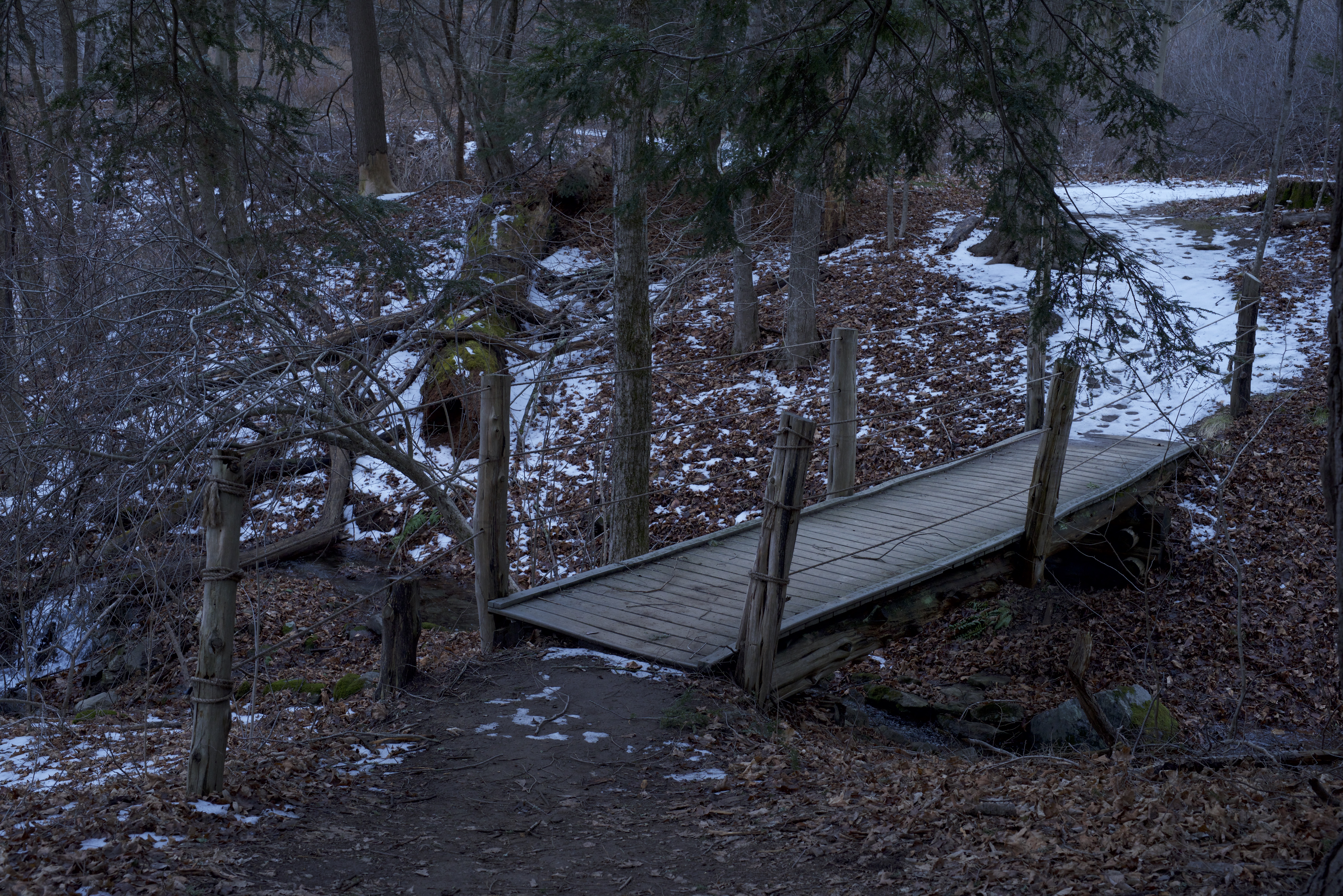
Audubon Center Bent of the River trail

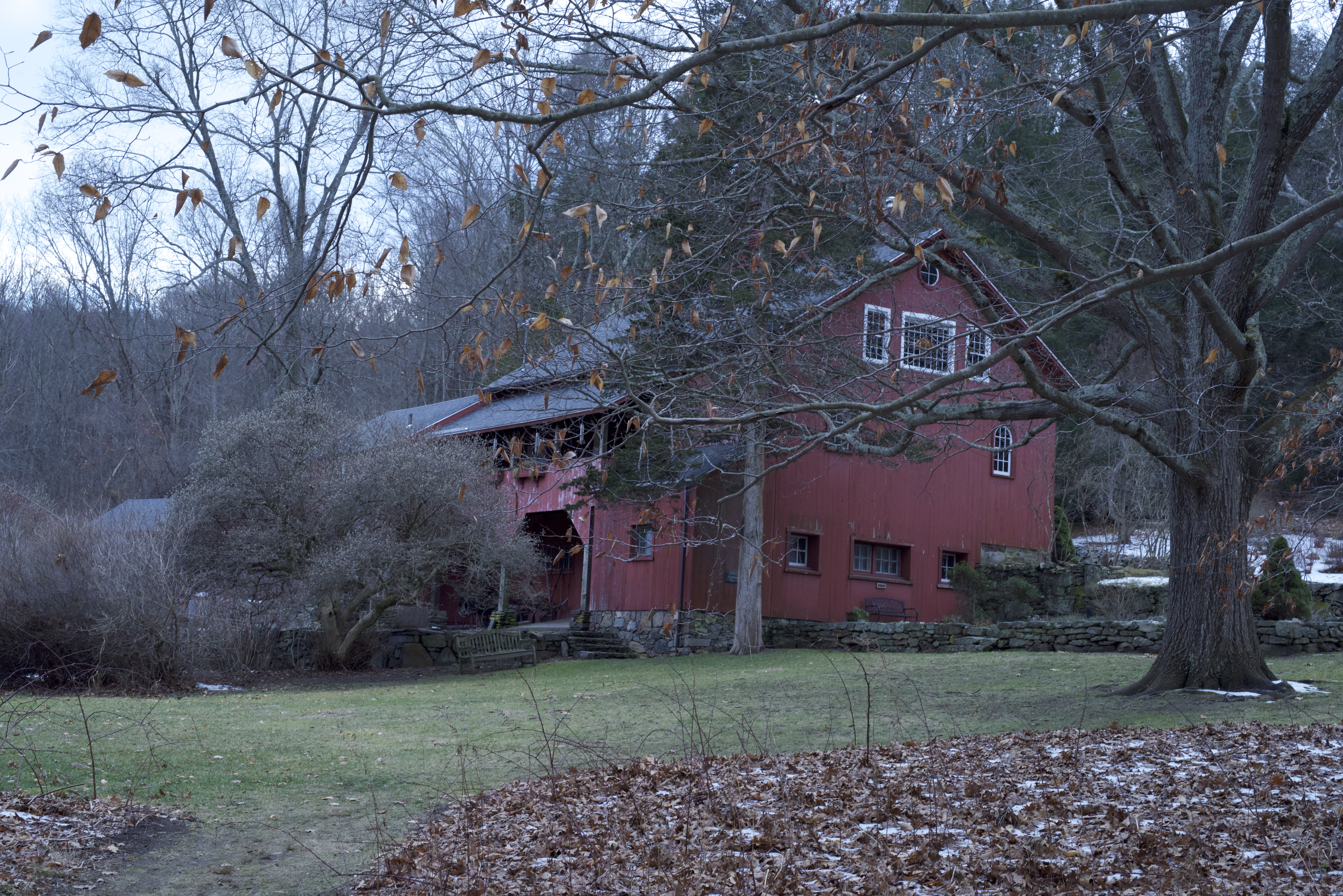
Audubon Center Bent of the River

=== National Historic Registry ===
- Aaron Bronson House – 846 Southford Road
- Adin Wheeler House and Theodore F. Wheeler Wheelwright Shop – 125 Quaker Farms Road
- Bullet Hill School – Main Street
- Hurley Road Historic District – 6 and 17 Hurley Road
- Little Pootatuck Brook Archeological Site
- Plaster House – 117 Plaster House Road
- Reuben Curtiss House – 1770 Bucks Hill Road
- Russian Village Historic District – Roughly Kiev Drive and Russian Village Road between US 6 and the Pomperaug River
- Sanford Road Historic District – 480 Sanford Road
- South Britain Historic District – East Flat Hill, Hawkins, Library, and Middle Roads., and 497-864 South Britain Road
- Southbury Historic District No. 1 – Main Street from Woodbury Town Line to Old Waterbury Road
- Southbury Training School – 1484 South Britain Road., a 1,600-acre (6.5 km^{2}) section of Southbury developed as a facility for mentally handicapped adults.
- William Hurd House – 327 Hulls Hill Road
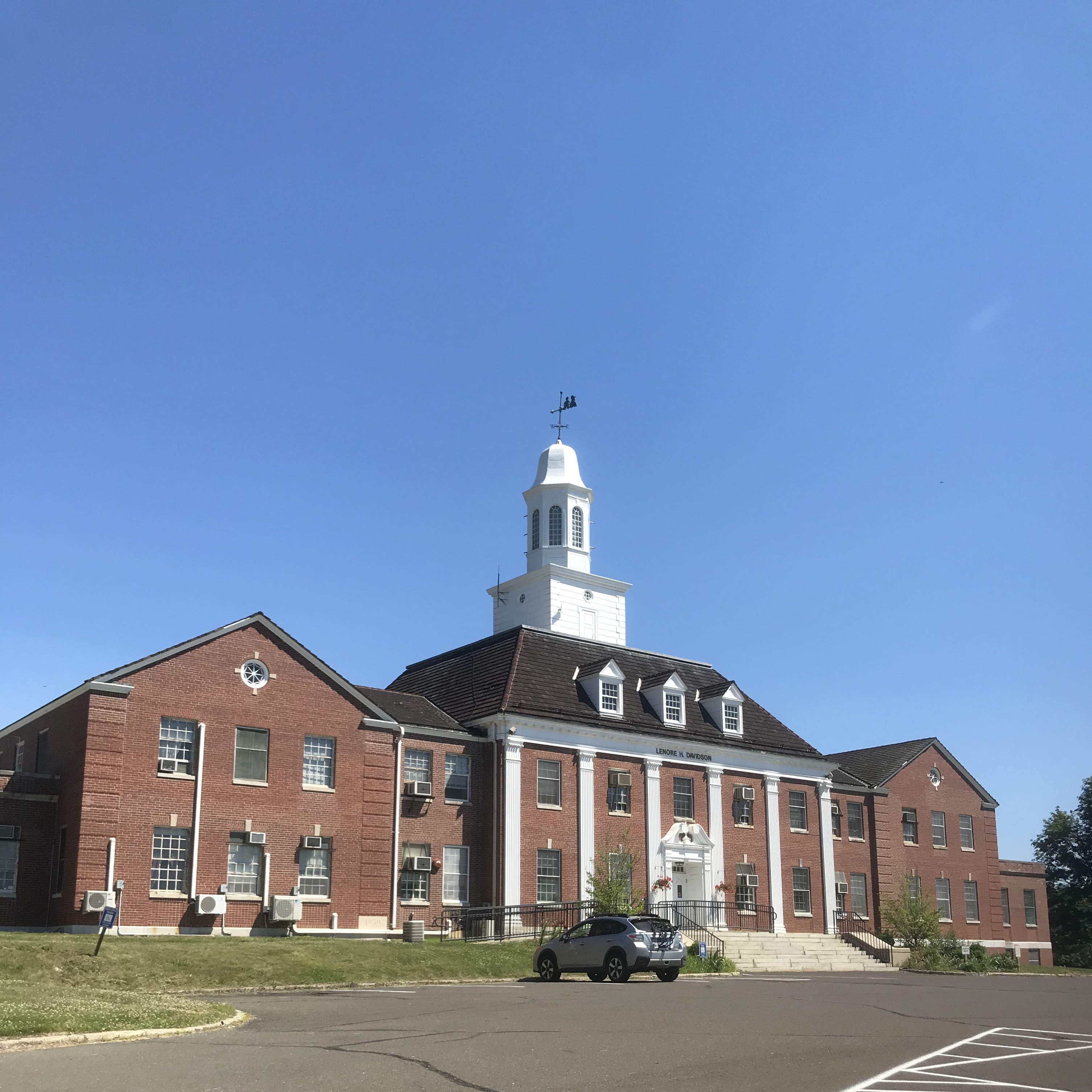
  Lenore H. Davidson Administration Building at Southbury Training School

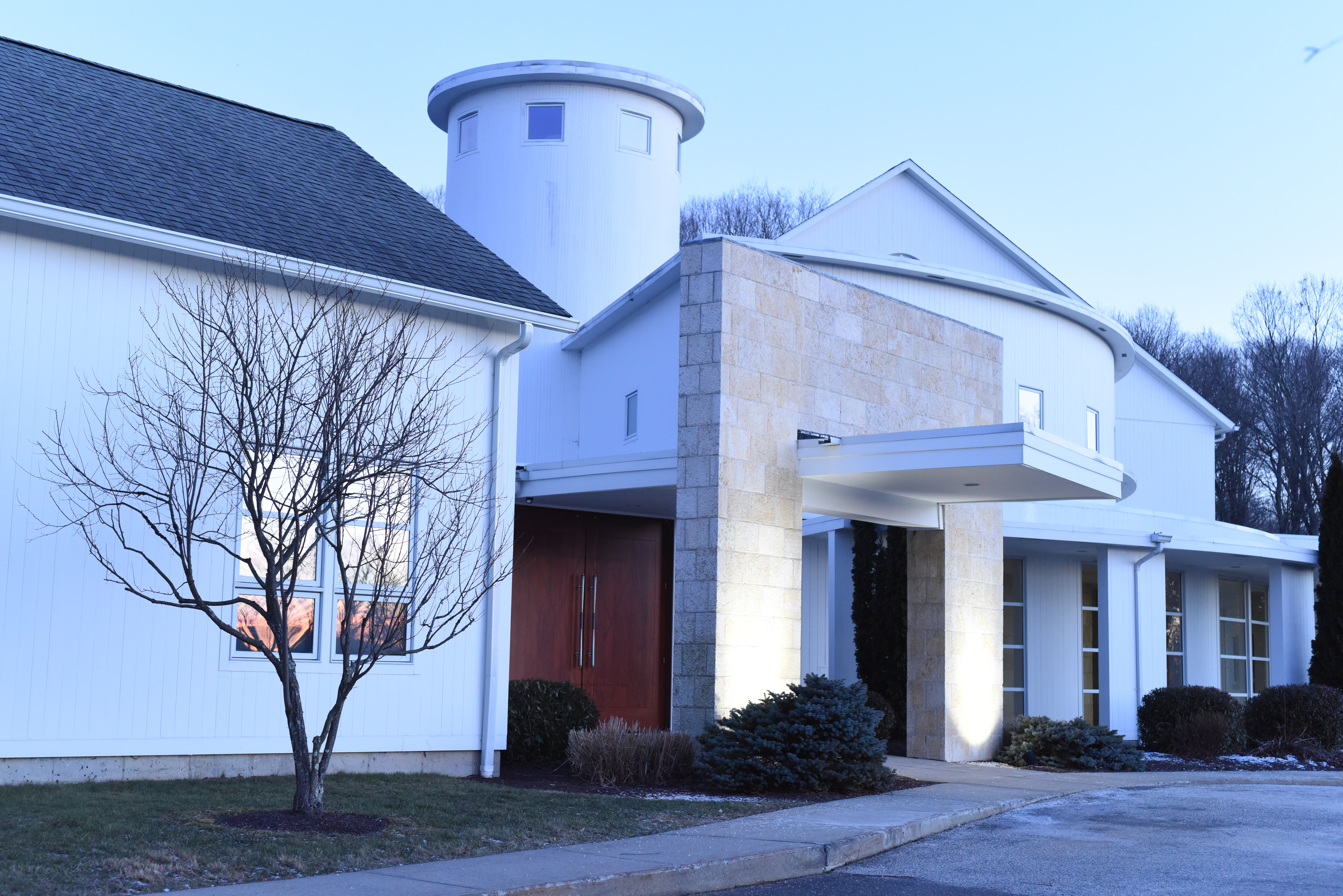
B'nai Israel Synagogue. Southbury, CT.

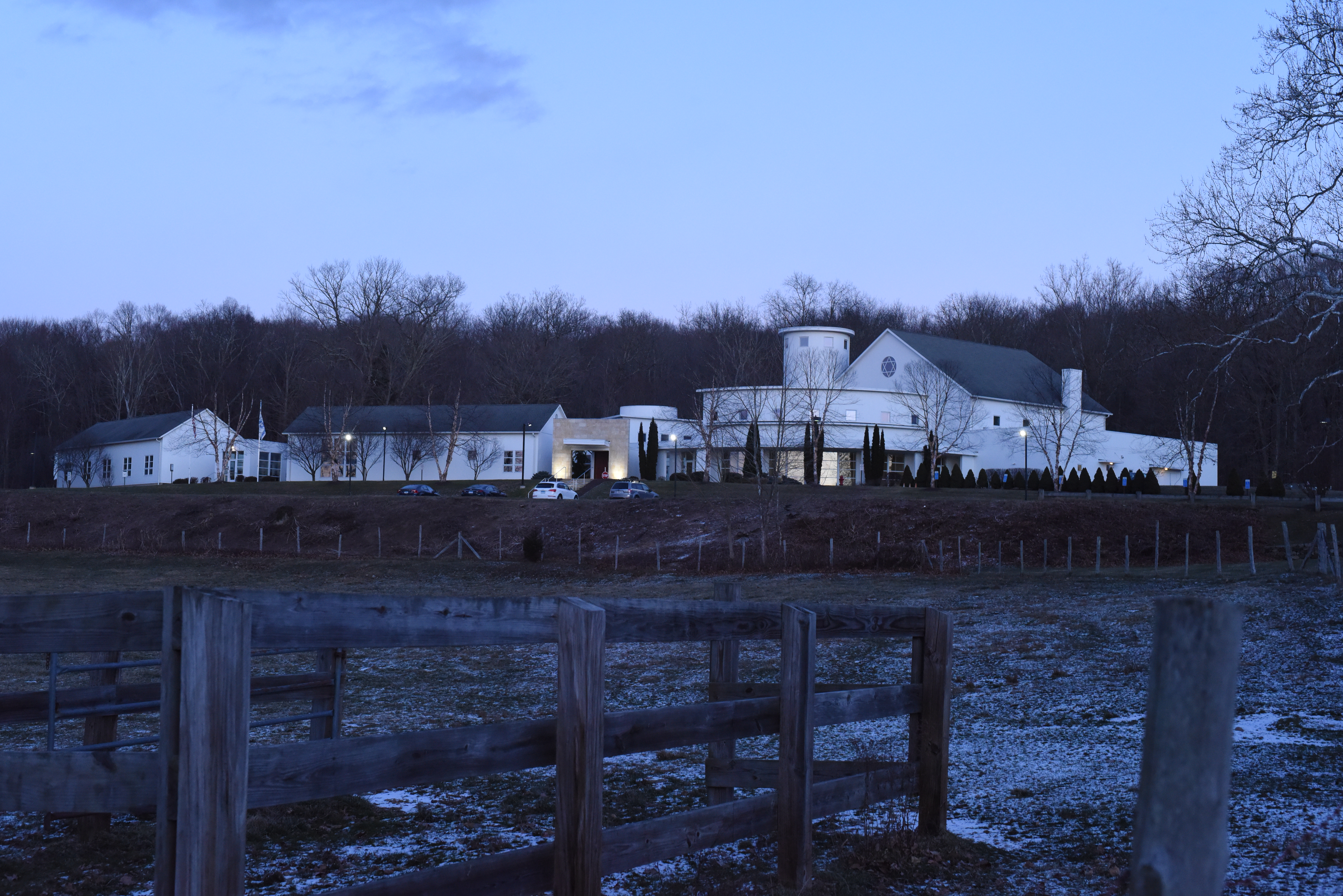
Overview of the B'nai Israel Temple. 444 Main Street North, Southbury, CT.

=== Southbury Training School ===
The Southbury Training School is a residential facility for individuals with developmental disabilities and other mental handicaps. The 1,400-acre campus contains a mix of large acreages of farmland still occasionally used by patients and 125 residential cottages. Southbury Training School's future is strongly contested, with some advocating the complete closure of the facility, and others suggesting expanding the facility's population to house more patients.

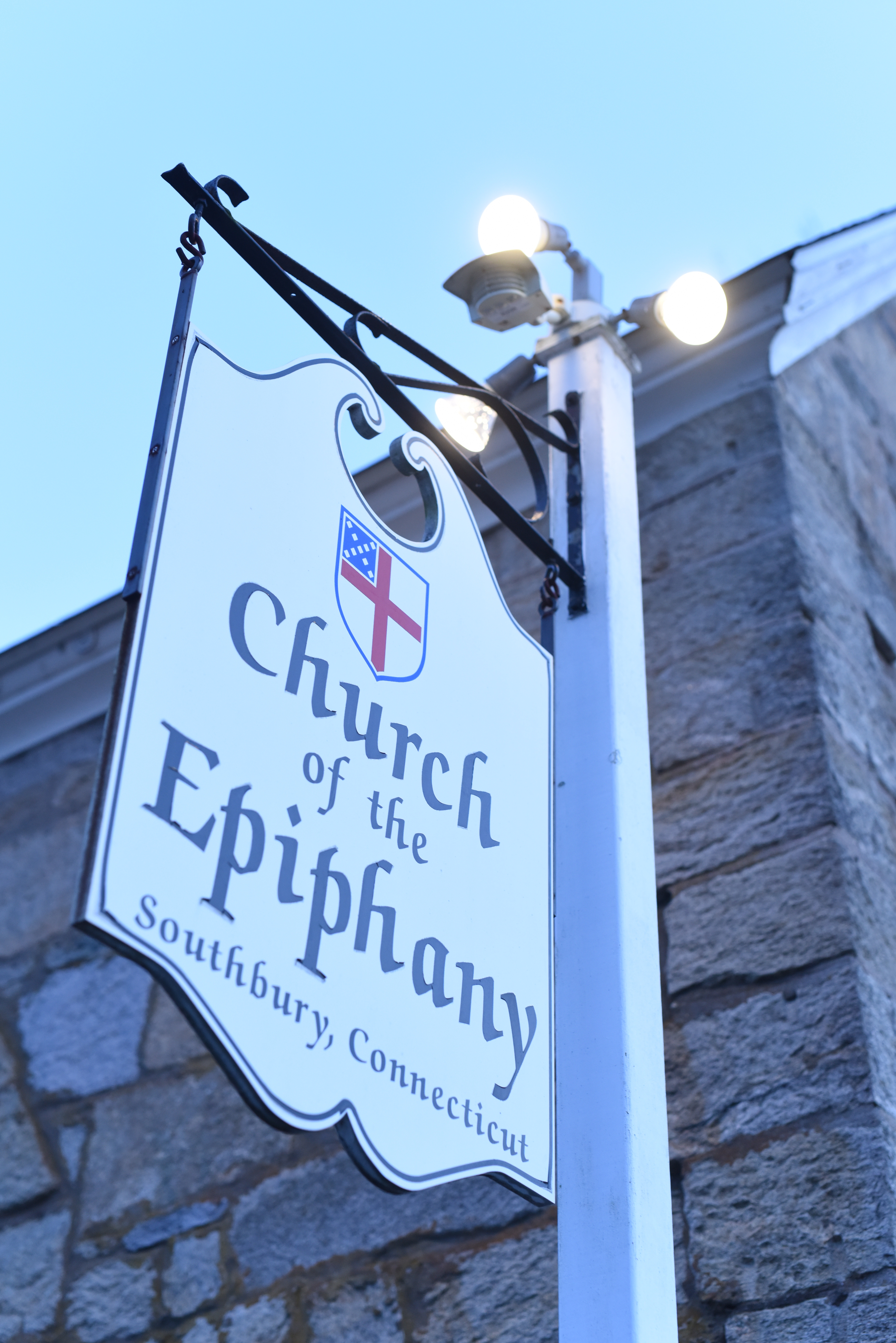
Church of the Epiphany

=== Southbury Public Library ===
The Southbury Public Library is a department of the town, with its own 9-member Board of Directors. On May 1, 2006, Southbury officially opened its new library (its 3rd, though no two have ever been in use concurrently) at 100 Poverty Road. This $6 million project was the first public building constructed in Southbury in 30 years. It is a 32,000-square-foot (3,000 m^{2}), 2 floor, state-of-the-art facility. It contains around 90,000 books. It has computers, audiobooks, DVDs, recording rooms for recording books for the blind, meeting rooms, internet, a fireplace and a coffee bar. Selections recorded for the blind at the Southbury Public Library become part of the National Library Service catalog.

Planning for the library began in 1998, with an original projected bond issue of $7.35m. The planning committee solicited donations from the public, which resulted in two single donations of $100,000 or more, and five more of between $25,000 and $99,000, in addition to smaller donations.

The old library building, at 561 Main Street South, has been converted to hold offices for the Parks and Recreation Department, as well as a new senior center. The old library was built in 1969 and expanded in 1979.

The oldest library building was located in South Britain (a section and Historic District of Southbury) and was replaced in 1969. It was built in 1904 and contained approximately 1,000 volumes.

=== Shepaug Dam and eagle observation area ===
The Shepaug Dam on the Housatonic River is part of a hydroelectric power plant, operated by FirstLight Power Resources, capable of a peak power output of 42,600 kW. This dam is a popular nesting and feeding ground for wintering eagles and hawks, including bald eagles. Near the power station, FirstLight also operates an eagle observation area first opened by the utility's predecessor, Northeast Utilities, in the mid-1980s. Access is free, and some telescopes are provided. Utility company employees and volunteers from the Connecticut Audubon Society and other groups are at the observation area to assist visitors. Advanced reservations are required. Eagles are attracted to the spot because the water churning through the dam's hydroelectric turbine keeps the surface from icing over, allowing the birds to fish. Red-tailed hawks, goshawks, great blue herons and other waterfowl are also attracted to the spot. The dam flooded an area now known as Lake Lillinonah.

FirstLight Power Resources has submitted a plan to the Connecticut Department of Public Utility Control to build a new peak-power plant next to the existing hydroelectric facility.

=== Parks ===
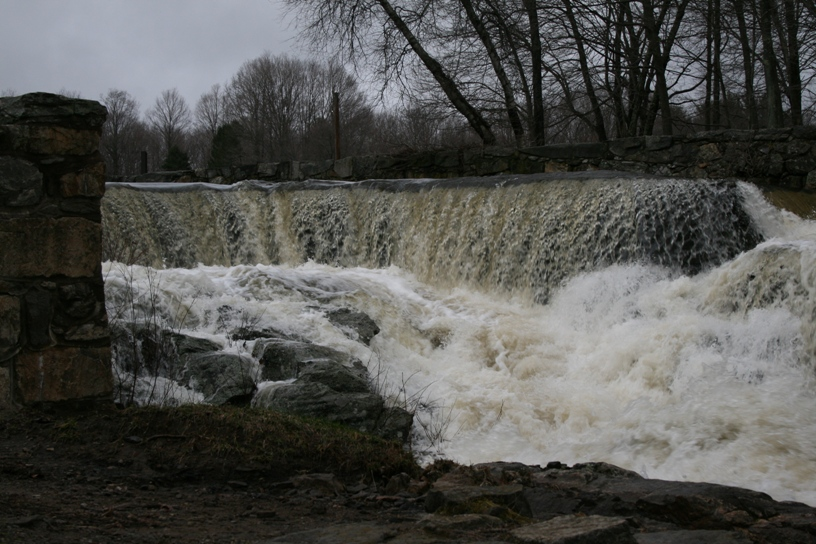
Southford Falls

- Kettletown State Park, a state park on the Housatonic River that includes campgrounds located off I-84 Exit 15
- Southford Falls State Park, a state park off I-84 Exit 15 and I-84 Exit 16
- George Waldo State Park, a state park located on the Housatonic River, off Purchase Brook Road
- Ballentine Park, a town park with fields, basketball courts and a public pool (town residents only)
- George Ewald Park, a town park consisting of little league baseball fields
- Audubon Center at Bent of the River, a 700-acre (2.8 km^{2}) nature sanctuary with about 15 miles (24 km) of hiking trails, an extensive nature library, and a bird-watching balcony
- Community Hose (Southbury, Connecticut)|Community House, a park consisting of newly renovated basketball courts, soccer field, football field, baseball field, and multiple tennis courts

== Businesses ==
=== IBM Southbury ===
The largest corporate complex in Southbury is that of IBM. IBM located its facilities between Kettletown Road and Bullet Hill Road, up a hill from Main Street on a 230-acre (0.93 km^{2}) site. Access to the site is restricted to authorized personnel only. Its original design and construction allowed for 1,100,000 square feet (100,000 m^{2}) of office space, intended for 2,500 people (later increased as around-the-clock operations began). It also had 250,000 square feet (23,000 m^{2}) of "raised floor" data center space, originally designed for large-scale water-cooled mainframe operations. It is an "off the grid" facility, with its power plant taking advantage of jet turbine technology to generate power for the entire site. In 2006, this power plant was replaced with a larger one as power demands increased. IBM Southbury was originally designed to be one of IBM's new corporate headquarters buildings, as IBM's "North Castle" facility in Armonk became outdated. It was never used for this purpose and has been primarily used as an IBM Global Services facility. There are four buildings, labeled A, B, C, and Central Services. Due to decreasing demand for office space, buildings A and C are currently shut down. It was announced in December 2023 that IBM would be closing the complex on January 26, 2024, with the jobs currently located there moving to other locations.

=== Southbury Corporate Park ===
Southbury Corporate Park is a largely theoretical 125-acre (0.51 km^{2}) site between I-84 exits 13 and 14. It is approved for roughly 900,000 square feet (84,000 m^{2}) of zone R60-C compliant corporate offices. The town purchased the site for a total of $5 million. It is designed to attract large corporate partners, or at worst, non-"big box" retailers. An arts center has also been proposed for the site, though this proposal was later revoked in favor of a possible location inside the Southbury Training School.

== Community organizations ==
=== Southbury Volunteer Firemen's Association ===
The Southbury Volunteer Firemen's Association, Inc. is a private, member-governed corporation, operating as a non-profit organization and is chartered for the purpose of providing emergency service to the community. Serving a rural territory which includes several miles of Interstate 84, single family homes, industrial, heavy commercial, institutional, and some multi-family occupancies. Founded in 1932, they operate out of 4 facilities, with 16 specialty fire vehicles, and 107 department members. They provide services including Fire Suppression, Motor Vehicle Extrication, Operations level HAZMAT, Confined Space, and Water Rescue to the community.

=== Southbury Ambulance Association ===
The Southbury Ambulance Association was started as a volunteer organization in 1953 by the Southbury Lions Club, handling both Southbury and Woodbury. The SAA had some of the first EMT's in the state in the 1970s. Until 1978, only SLC members were allowed to join the SAA, which caused difficulties in finding sufficient crew for the ambulance service. As of 1997, the SAA was responding to more than 1,500 service calls a year. Today, the SAA still operates as a volunteer organization which receives zero funding from the town. It currently operates three ambulances.

=== Southbury Land Trust ===
The Southbury Land Trust is a "private nonprofit conservation organization dedicated to the protection and preservation of Southbury Connecticut's natural resources for the enjoyment and benefit of all present and future generations." Basically, the SLT purchases or is gifted with land which it places development restrictions on. They currently control more than 800 acres (3.2 km^{2}) of land in Southbury. Much of this land is open to the public.

== Notable people ==
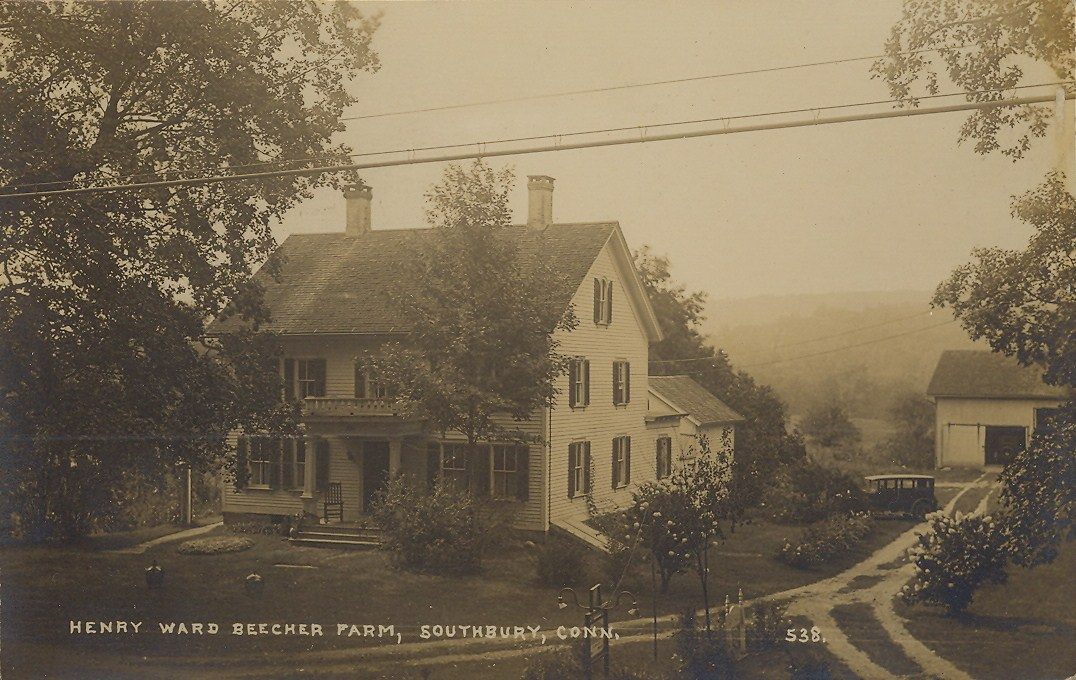
Henry Ward Beecher farm in Southbury

- Howard Malcolm Baldrige (1894–1985), politician and lawyer; father of Howard M. Baldrige, Jr. and Letitia Baldrige
- Polly Bergen (1930–2014), actress, recording artist, and entrepreneur. Bergen called a vintage house on several wooded acres in the South Britain area her home
- Victor Borge (1909–2000), comedian, owned the Colonial House in Southbury, which now serves as a community center. His estate and Cornish hen game farm is now Heritage Village
- Linda Cohn (born 1959), sportscaster on the ESPN network
- Philip Evergood (1901–1973), painter, etcher, lithographer, sculptor, illustrator, and writer
- Joel Hinman (1802–1870), Chief Justice, Connecticut Supreme Court of Errors
- James Ledbetter, author and editor based in New York City
- Mark W. Libby, United States diplomat
- Dave Longstreth, singer and guitarist for the Brooklyn-based band, Dirty Projectors
- Jake Longstreth, American painter, musician, and internet radio personality
- Jan Miner (1917–2004), actress, most likely to be remembered as "Madge the Manicurist" in dozens of TV commercials for Palmolive dishwashing soap
- Wallace Nutting (1861–1941), famed photographer (and also a minister, author, lecturer, furniture maker), moved his photography studio to a farm in town from New York City in 1899. In 1912, he moved again to Framingham, Massachusetts
- Billy Frolick (born 1959), American screenwriter who wrote Madagascar and PAW Patrol: The Movie
- Ralph Dunning Smyth (1804-1874), American judge and politician
- Leland Stowe (1899–1994), Pulitzer Prize-winning journalist and one of the first to recognize the expansionist character of the German Nazi regime
- Ed Sullivan (1901–1974), iconic television personality and columnist; had a country home in town
- Gladys Taber (1899–1980), author of 59 books and columnist in the Lady's Home Journal, lived in "Stillmeadow", a 1690 farmhouse off Jeremy Swamp Road, starting in 1933 (summers only) and 1935 (full-time)
- Sada Thompson (1927–2011), an actress of stage, screen, and television, perhaps best known for her role on the long-running ABC drama Family
- Krista Watterworth. interior designer and TV personality
