= Southbury Training School =

- U.S. National Register of Historic Places
- U.S. Historic district
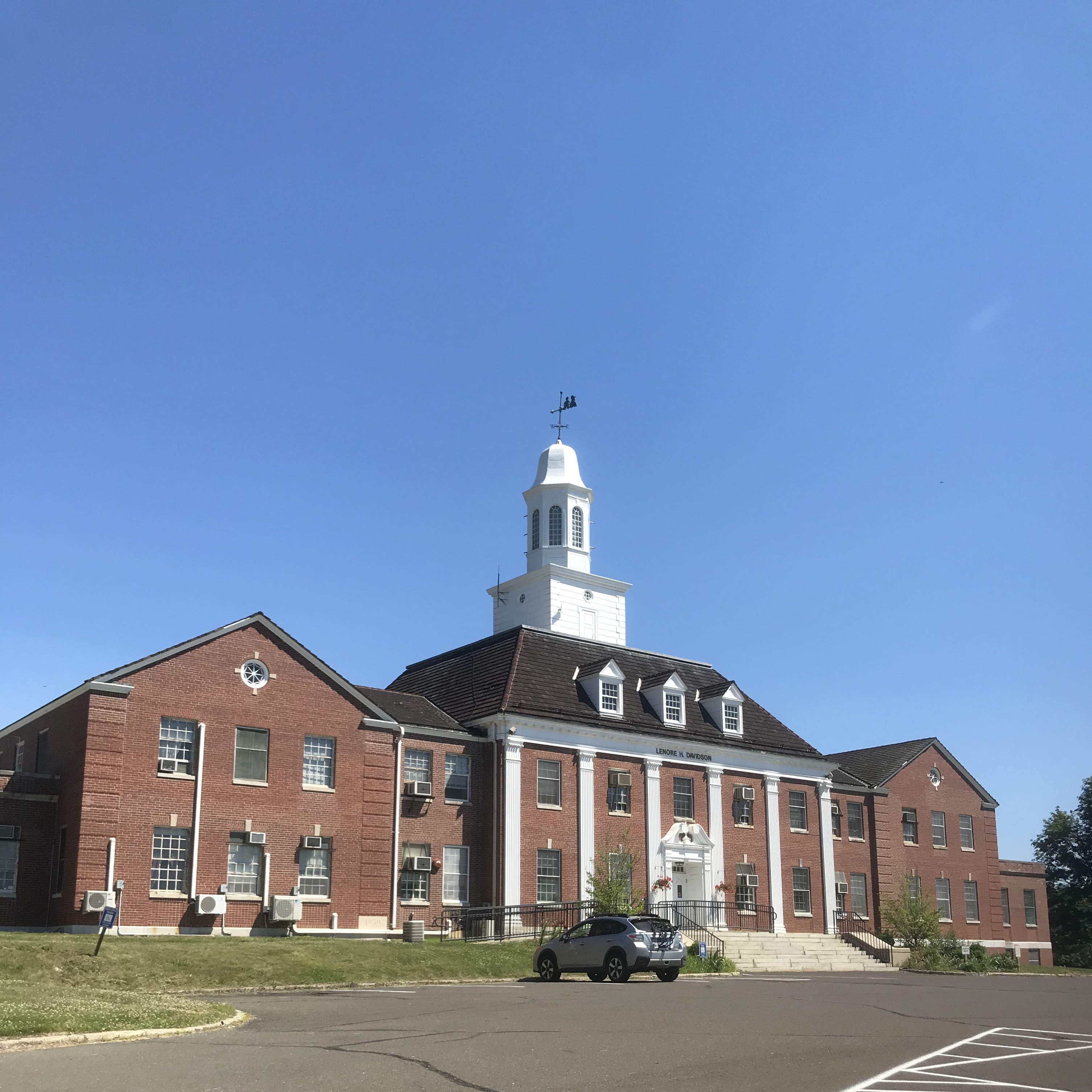
- Lenore H. Davidson Building, the administrative building at the Southbury Training School that also houses a location of the CT State Employees Credit Union.

- Location within Connecticut Location within the United States
- Location: 1461 South Britain Road, Southbury, Connecticut
- Coordinates: 41°27′49″N 73°16′23″W
- Area: 1,600 acres (650 ha)
- Built: 1940
- Architect: Salmon, Edwin A.; et al.
- Architectural style: Colonial Revival
- NRHP reference No.: 92000368
- Added to NRHP: May 1, 1992

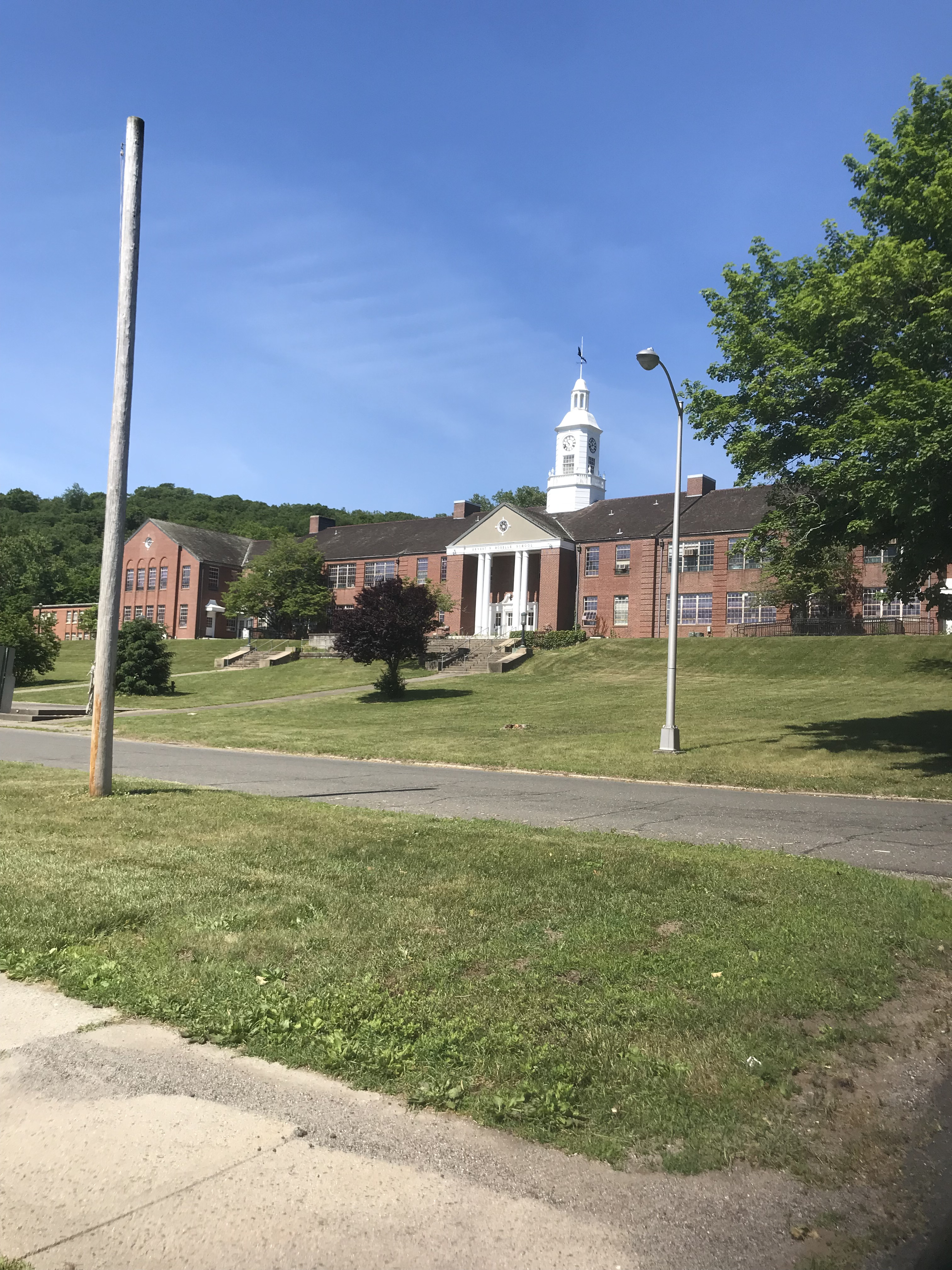
Ernest N. Roselle School building at Southbury Training School. It is the largest building on campus and houses medical and dental units, the old gymnasiums and classrooms, as well as other day program areas for residents.

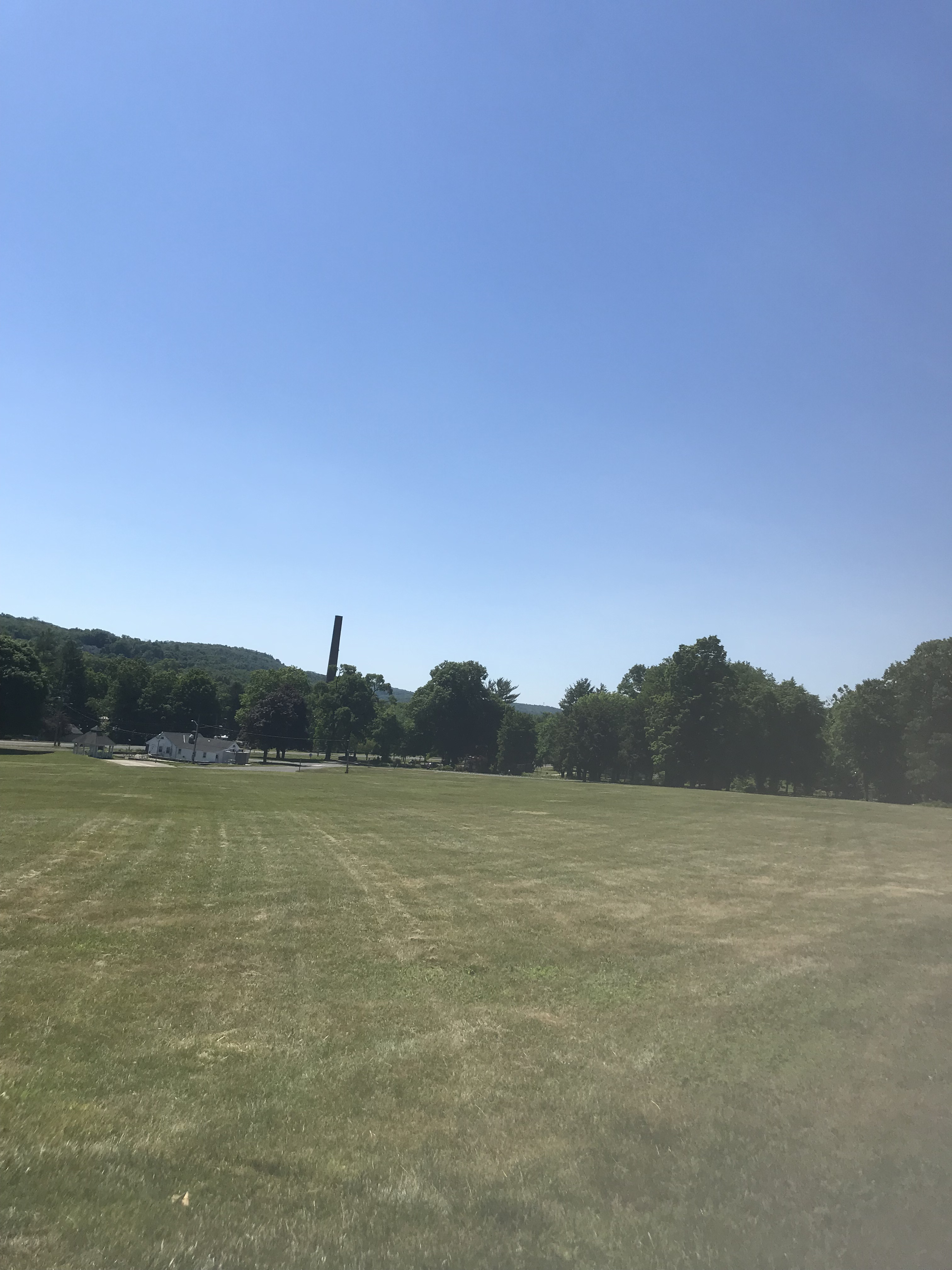
The Great Lawn at the Southbury Training School is the large hill at the front of the campus, in front of the Ernest N. Roselle School building which faces Route-172.

Southbury Training School is a large residential facility located in Southbury, Connecticut. It was built in the 1930s as a large state-funded and state-operated residential and habilitative facility for adults with intellectual disabilities. It consists of 125 buildings situated on a campus of 1,600 acres (6.5 km^{2}). It independently operates its own power, heat, sewage treatment, water, laundry, fire, ambulance, public safety, building maintenance, transportation and dietary services. It is run by the Connecticut Department of Developmental Services. The facility is listed as a historic district on the National Register of Historic Places.

== History ==
Southbury Training School was built in the 1930s as a state school. It is and was self-sufficient from the town of Southbury.

In 1976, John Lennon donated his 1970 Oscar statuette for auction to raise money for the school, which netted $600. It was auctioned again in 1992 for $110,000 with a portion of those proceeds going to the school.

In 1986, admissions to the school were closed. There was a recorded population of 1,111. The Department of Intellectual Disabilities was directed to attempt to place residents in group homes and other such settings.

The facility was listed on the National Register of Historic Places in 1992.

In 1997, STS was prohibited from accepting any new residents, however, the school continued operation. The school had 782 residents remaining.

As of 2000, STS maintained a staff of 1,700 people. 696 residents were remaining.

As of 2001, STS had 639 residents remaining. The average age was 55, and the average resident had been at the school for 43 years. The State intends to continue decreasing the number of residents through placement in other settings and through the death of residents. As of 2019, STS has 180 residents remaining.

== Conditions ==
In 1984, the first major lawsuit regarding the conditions at STS was filed by the United States of America against the State of Connecticut. A consent decree settled the suit in 1986, requiring that the State shall improve the conditions of both the care and the facilities.

In 1996, the United States District Court for the District of New Haven held the State in contempt of the consent decree.

In 1997, an order was issued and a special master appointed to oversee the school.

In 2005, Governor Jodi Rell requested the removal of David Ferleger from the role as a special master, also using the opportunity to request the removal of the special masters as a whole.

Without granting the state a hearing, the federal court rejected the state's request to end Mr. Ferleger's work for the court as special master. “As a federally appointed 'special master,' Ferleger is responsible for making sure Connecticut complies with a 10-year-old U.S. Department of Justice order to improve conditions at the facility for the intellectually disabled. In her ruling, Burns said that the state 'pointed to nothing' in Ferleger's execution of his duties over the past eight years to suggest they were deficient." Hartford Courant, “Ruling Keeps Monitor on Job: State Loses Bid to Remove Training School ‘Special Master’” Colin Poitras, December 15, 2005

The state unsuccessfully contested most of the special master’s reports. As one historical summary of the case puts it, “the court ultimately accepted all of the reports.” Civil Rights Litigation Clearinghouse. IN 2006, STS was released from judicial oversight.

On June 4, 2008, in another lawsuit about Southbury Training School called Messier v. Southbury Training School, the federal court relied on the findings of Special Master Ferleger to find that most of the challenged inadequacies has been remedied under his evaluation process. “In a process of evaluation lasting almost a decade, the Special Master, with the assistance of experts commissioned by him and the parties, measured improvements at STS against the standards set forth in the Court Requirements. Periodically, when the Special Master concluded that the defendants had demonstrated compliance with a particular Court Requirement, he recommended that the court release STS from oversight for that Court Requirement.” Court Ruling, June 4, 2008, Messier v. Southbury Training School.

== See also ==
- National Register of Historic Places listings in Litchfield County, Connecticut
- National Register of Historic Places listings in New Haven County, Connecticut
