= Southbury Historic District No. 1 =

- U.S. National Register of Historic Places
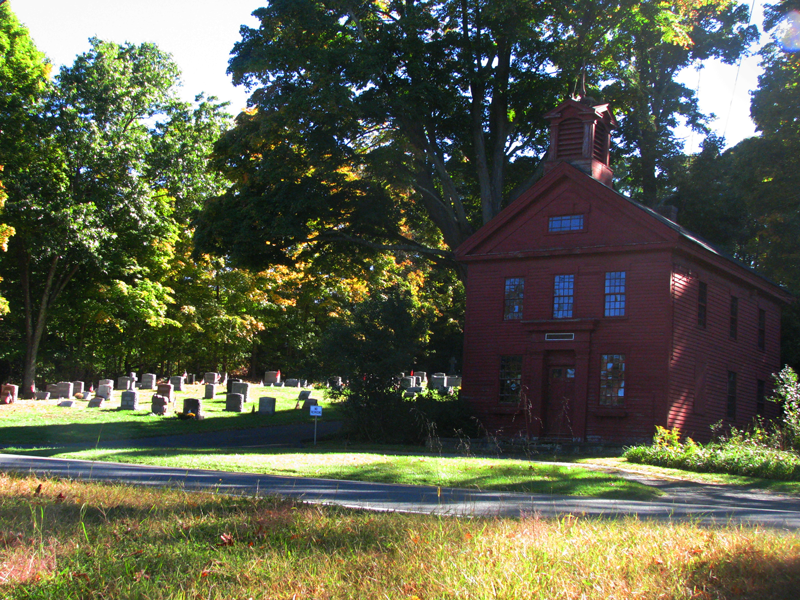
- Stiles Memorial Cemetery

- Location within Connecticut Location within the United States
- Location: Main Street North from Woodbury Town Line to Old Waterbury Road, Southbury, Connecticut
- Coordinates: 41°29′42″N 73°12′37″W
- Area: 100 acres (40 ha)
- Built: 1776
- Architectural style: Georgian; Federal; Greek Revival
- NRHP reference No.: 71000917
- Added to NRHP: March 11, 1971

The Southbury Historic District No. 1 encompasses a well-preserved 19th-century village landscape along Main Street North (Route 6) in Southbury, Connecticut. This area includes the historic town center of Southbury, and is part of a larger streetscape extending into neighboring Woodbury, where it continues in the Woodbury Historic District No. 2. The district was listed on the National Register of Historic Places in 1971.

== Description and history ==
The Southbury Historic District Number 1 extends along Main Street North from Old Waterbury Road in the south, northward for about 2 miles (3.2 km) along that roadway to the Woodbury town line. This area includes a streetscape of irregularly spaced houses, older municipal buildings, and a church, with the buildings generally widely spaced with ample surrounding greenery. Stone walls line portions of the right of way, and in some areas, the former roadway has been bypassed to straighten curves, leaving further indications of the historic streetscape. Buildings in the district were predominantly built in the 18th and 19th centuries, with few 20th-century intrusions. They are typically of wood-frame construction, and even many of the 20th-century intrusions are executed in sympathetic Colonial Revival style. Notable buildings include the brick Bullet Hill School (1778), one of Connecticut's oldest surviving schoolhouses, and the White Oak Schoolhouse.

Southbury's Main Street was laid out in the 17th century, when the area was part of Woodbury. Southbury was established as a separate parish of that town in early 18th century, and was separately incorporated in 1845. Its original common area, site of its first church was located in the northern part of the district. Notable 18th and 19th residents of the area include the Revolutionary War militia leader Benjamin Hinman, author Peter Parley, and David Stiles, owner of a major ironworks in neighboring Roxbury.

== See also ==
- National Register of Historic Places listings in New Haven County, Connecticut
