= October 1950 =

Month of 1950

<<	October 1950					>>
Su	Mo	Tu	We	Th	Fr	Sa
1	2	3	4	5	6	7
8	9	10	11	12	13	14
15	16	17	18	19	20	21
22	23	24	25	26	27	28
29	30	31

The following events occurred in October 1950:

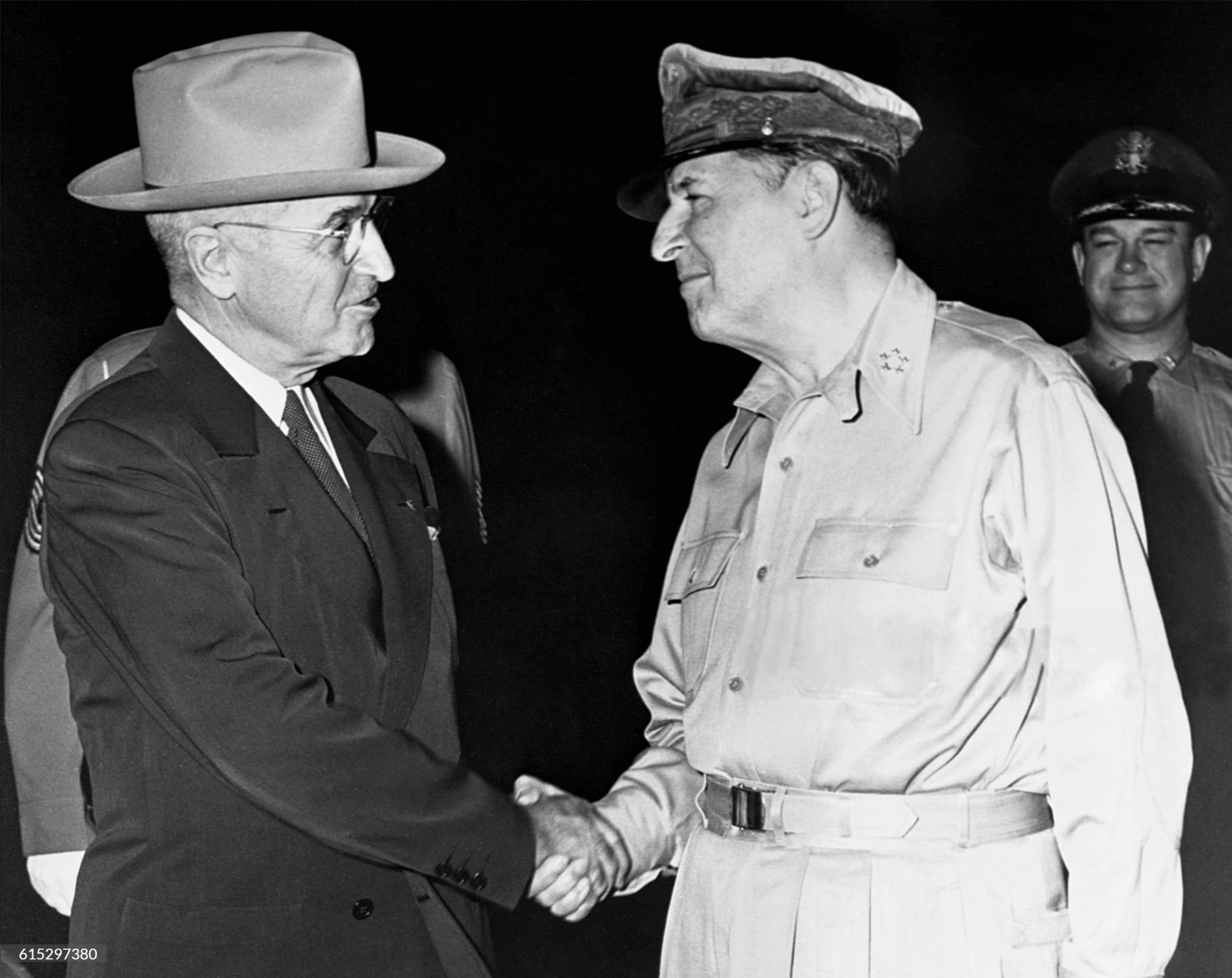
October 15, 1950: President Truman and General MacArthur meet at Wake Island

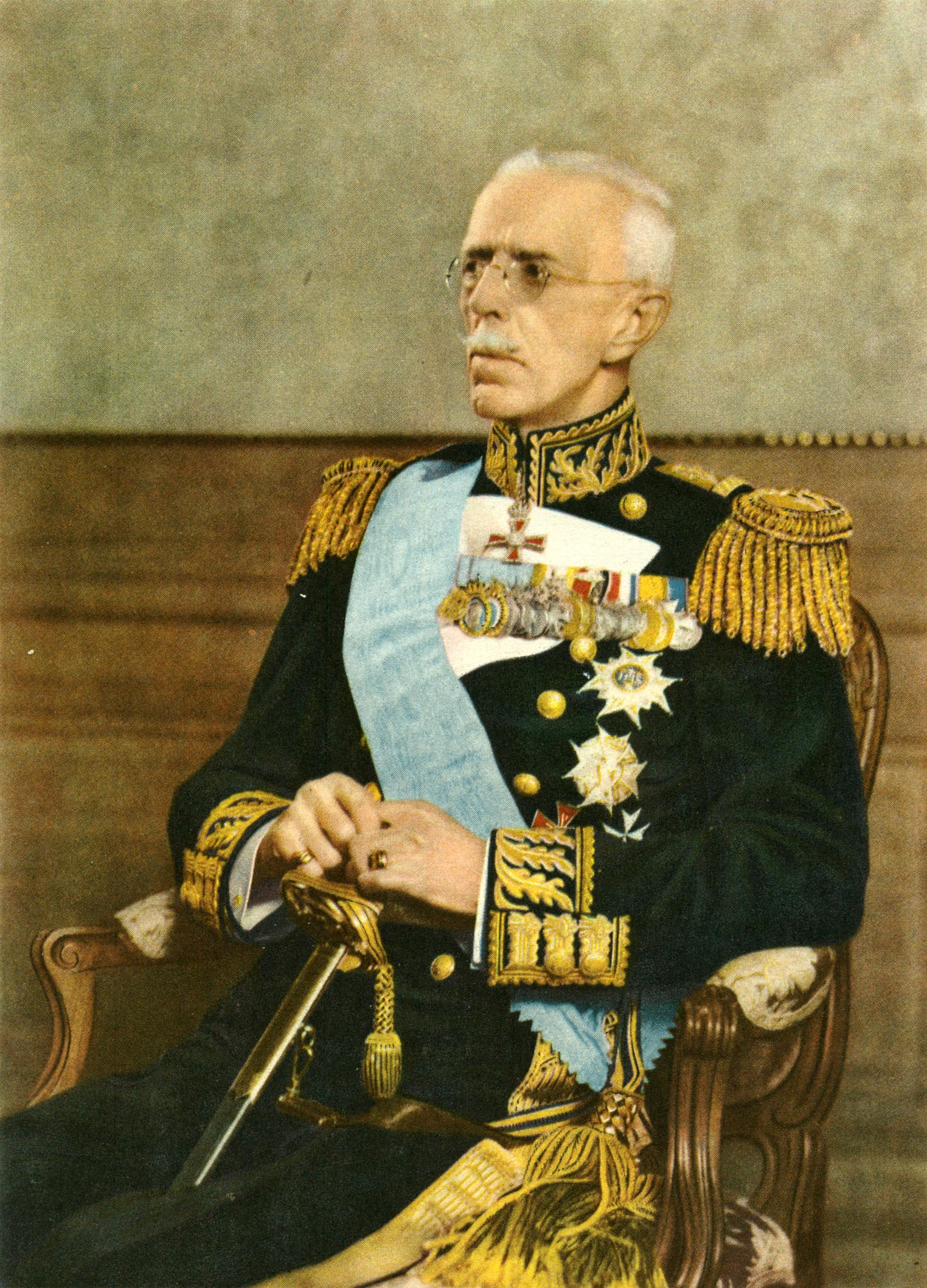
October 29, 1950: King Gustav V of Sweden dies after 42-year reign

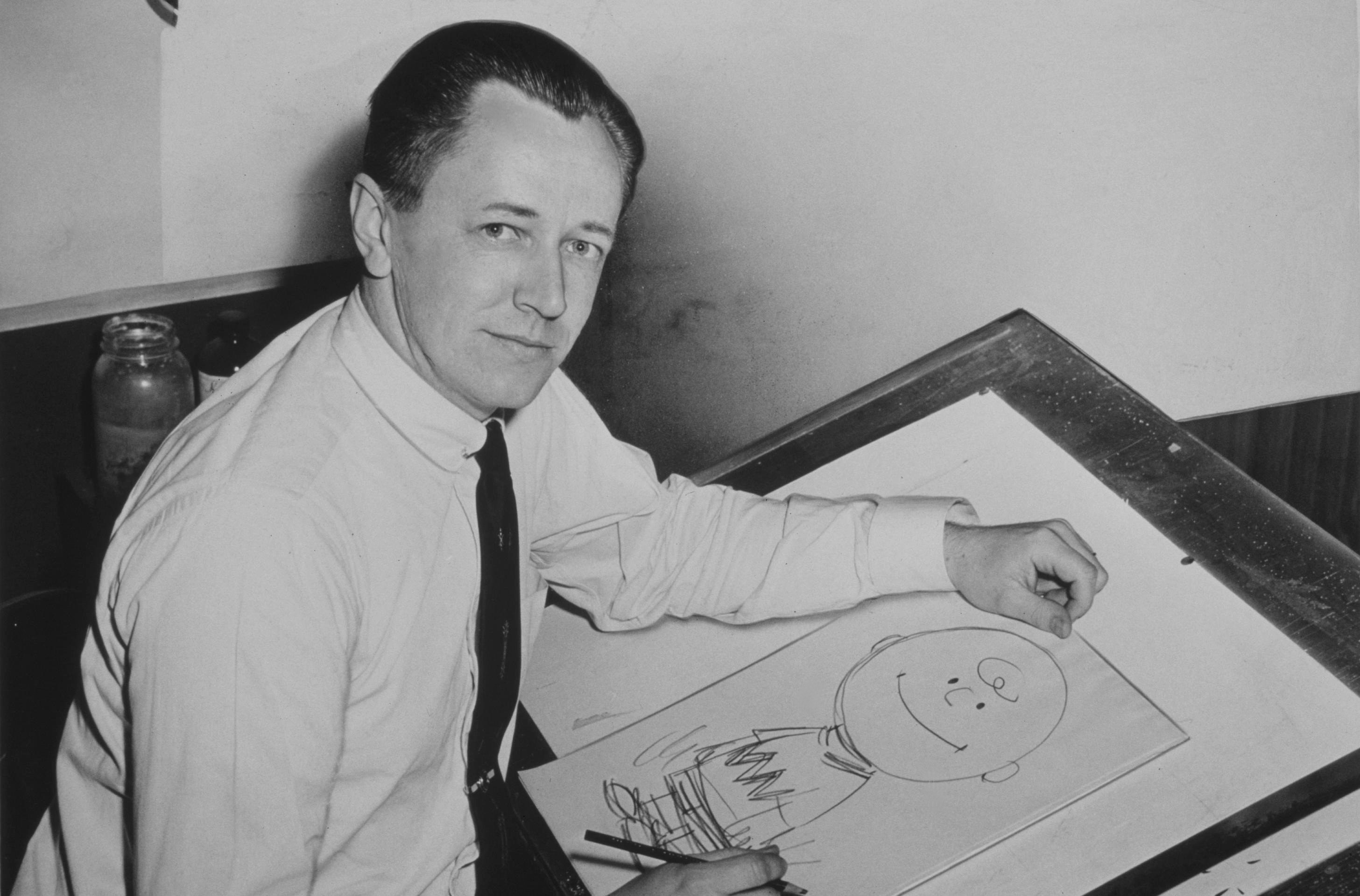
October 2, 1950: Charles M. Schulz introduces Charlie Brown

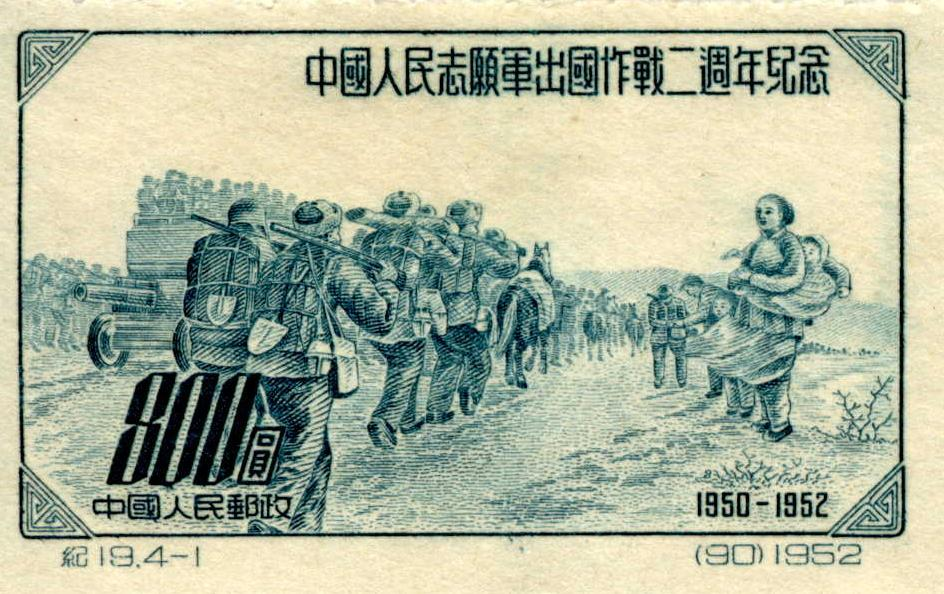
October 8, 1950: China's "People's Volunteer Army" created

== October 1, 1950 (Sunday) ==
- Led by Võ Nguyên Giáp, Communist troops in the northern section of the French Indochina colony of Vietnam began a campaign of attacks on French colonial fortresses along the border with China, Battle of Route Coloniale 4. The 10,000 French troops in the forts faced 14 infantry and three artillery battalions, and were separated from the main French armies by 300 miles of jungle, and all of them would fall by October 17.

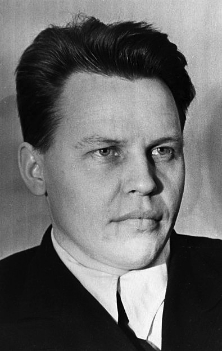
Voznesensky

- In a conclusion of what would later be called the Leningrad Affair, six prominent leaders in the Soviet city of Leningrad (now Saint Petersburg, Russia) were executed following their organization of an unauthorized trade fair in 1949. Convicted and shot were Mikhail Rodionov, the former Chairman of the Council of Ministers of the Russian SFSR; Pyotr Popkov, the Leningrad regional secretary; Soviet Planning Committee Chairman Nikolai Voznesensky; Leningrad First Secretary Aleksey Kuznetsov; Lengingrad Deputy Secretary Ya. F. Kapustin; and Leningrad Mayor P.G. Lazutin.
- The minesweeper USS Magpie became the first American ship to be sunk during the Korean War, after striking a mine. Twenty-one people, including the ship's commander, Lt. (j.g.) Warren R. Pierson, were killed.
- On the final day of the 1950 National League baseball season, the second-place Brooklyn Dodgers hosted the league-leading Philadelphia Phillies, after having closed the gap from nine games behind to only one. A Brooklyn win would have both teams tied at 90-64 and would have forced a playoff for the pennant, and the Dodgers had the bases loaded and were tied 1–1 in the ninth inning; but a deep right center hit by Gil Hodges was caught, and the Phillies went on to the World Series with a 4–1 win.
- The Tallkrogen, Gullmarsplan, Medborgarplatsen, Skanstull and Skogskyrkogården metro stations on the Stockholm Metro were inaugurated in Sweden.
- Born:
  - Boris Morukov, Russian cosmonaut who flew as an astronaut on the Space Shuttle Atlantis in 2006; in Moscow (died 2015)
  - Randy Quaid, American actor; in Houston, Texas

== October 2, 1950 (Monday) ==
- The comic strip Peanuts, by Charles M. Schulz, was published for the first time, in seven U.S. newspapers, including the Washington Post, the Chicago Tribune, the Minneapolis Star Tribune and the Seattle Times. In the very first strip, the main character was introduced in a statement by Shermy (a character later dropped from the comic) who said, "Well! Here comes Ol' Charlie Brown! Good Ol' Charlie Brown.... Yes, sir! Good Ol' Charlie Brown.... How I hate him!". Schulz's final installment would appear on February 13, 2000, the day after his death.
- As United Nations forces continued to drive northward in North Korea, China's leader, Mao Zedong, convened a special session of the Communist Party Politburo and made the decision to enter the Korean War, sending a request for military assistance to Soviet leader Joseph Stalin the same day.

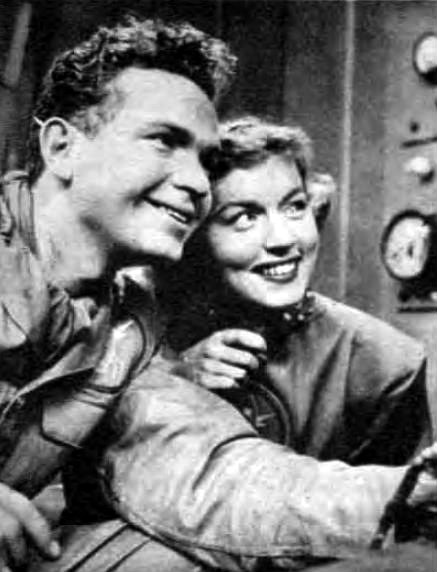
Tom Corbett and Dr. Joan Dale

- Tom Corbett, Space Cadet began a three-season run on CBS television, as a competitor to the DuMont network science fiction program Captain Video and His Video Rangers. With a larger budget than Captain Video, the 15-minute segments appeared on Monday, Wednesday and Friday at 6:45 in the evening. The show was inspired by the Robert A. Heinlein science fiction novel, Space Cadet, and starred Frankie Thomas in the title role.
- Lux Video Theatre, a television adaptation of the popular US anthology, Lux Radio Theatre, began a seven-season run. Telecast live for its first three years, the show was premiered on CBS with a 30-minute adaptation of the Maxwell Anderson play Saturday's Children.

== October 3, 1950 (Tuesday) ==
- Mao Zedong hosted India's ambassador to China, K. M. Panikkar, at his residence in Beijing and asked him to inform the United States that China would invade Korea if American troops crossed the 38th Parallel into North Korea, but not if the invasion was limited to South Korean troops alone. U.S. Secretary of State Dean Acheson received Pannikar's message later in the day, but the United States did not alter its progress toward the Chinese border.
- In elections in Brazil, former President Getúlio Vargas, of the Brazilian Labour Party, was elected as the 17th President of Brazil for a 5-year term, defeating challengers Eduardo Gomes and Cristiano Machado. Vargas had previously served from 1930 to 1945. The Social Democratic Party, retained a plurality in the Chamber of Deputies, with 112 of the 304 seats.
- Renmin University of China was opened in Beijing as "New China's first new-style regular university". Initially, the Chinese People's University (Zhongguo renmin daxue) was referred to as Renda.

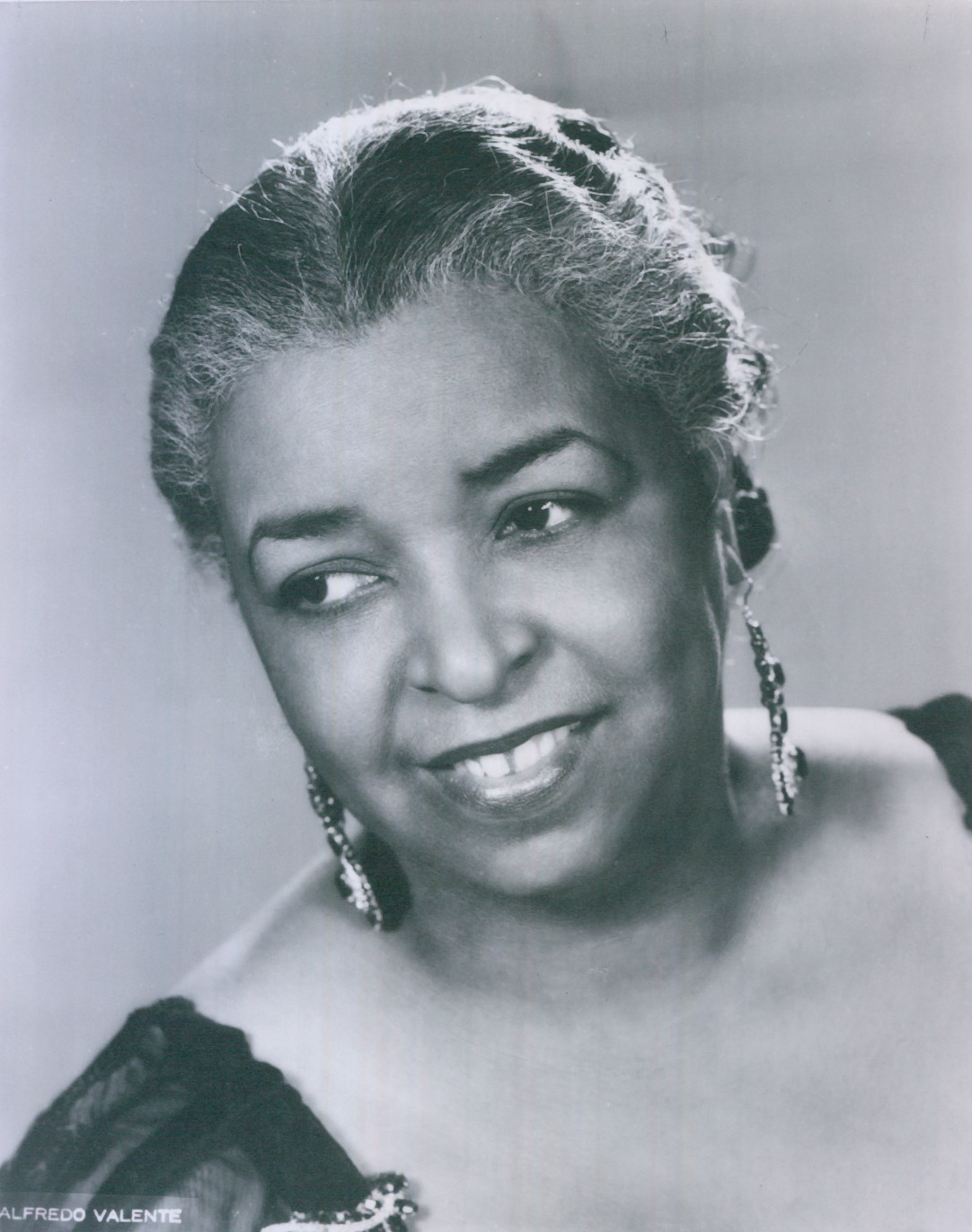
Ethel Waters

- Beulah, the first television series to star an African-American, premiered on the ABC television network, with actress and comedienne Ethel Waters as the title character, the Negro maid for a white family, the Hendersons. Beulah is now considered an example of the stereotypes of African Americans that were popular prior to the 1960s, although Beulah herself was portrayed as smarter than her employers. The show had been adapted from a radio comedy series of the same name and would run for three seasons.
- Bellarmine University held its first classes, after having been established by the Roman Catholic Archdiocese of Louisville, Kentucky.
- Born: Phyllis Nelson, U.S. singer-songwriter; in Jacksonville, Florida (died 1998)

== October 4, 1950 (Wednesday) ==
- General Peng Dehuai was in Xi'an when an airplane arrived and he was told to get on board to report for a meeting in Beijing with China's Communist Party Central Committee. Within four hours, he was present at the Zhongnanhai palace, and informed that Mao Zedong had selected him to command China's invasion of Korea. He led the invasion two weeks later. Marshal Lin Biao who, like most of the Politburo, was opposed to the invasion, had been Mao's first choice but had declined.
- Snoopy, the most famous dog in comic strip history, made his first appearance in the comic strip Peanuts. He would not be identified by name until May 22, 1951. His thoughts would become a regular part of the story starting on May 27, 1952, and he would begin walking upright starting on January 9, 1956.
- Died: Marek Kubliński, 19, Polish student, was executed for anti-Communist activity

== October 5, 1950 (Thursday) ==
- For the first time since the surrender of Germany at the end of World War II, the four Allied Powers allowed German citizens to charter and to fly civilian aircraft, subject to approval of each flight by the Allied Civil Aviation Board at Wiesbaden. For more than five years, West Germany and East Germany had been a "no fly zone" for domestic aircraft.
- Gas explosions at four sewers in the neighborhoods of Greenpoint, Brooklyn, set off rumors that an atomic war had started and set off a panic of thousands of New York City residents. The blasts sent manhole covers as high as five stories above the street and sent blue flames into the air, and emergency calls brought police, emergency and fire department squads to the seven-block area. Nobody was injured.

== October 6, 1950 (Friday) ==
- The United States reassured the United Kingdom that General Douglas MacArthur had been clearly instructed not to attack Manchuria or any other part of China, and that the orders would not change without consultation between the U.S. and its allies.
- Havana Senator Félix Lancís Sánchez became Prime Minister of Cuba, succeeding Manuel Antonio de Varona.
- UNCURK, the United Nations Commission for the Unification and Rehabilitation of Korea, was established by vote of the General Assembly of the United Nations.

== October 7, 1950 (Saturday) ==
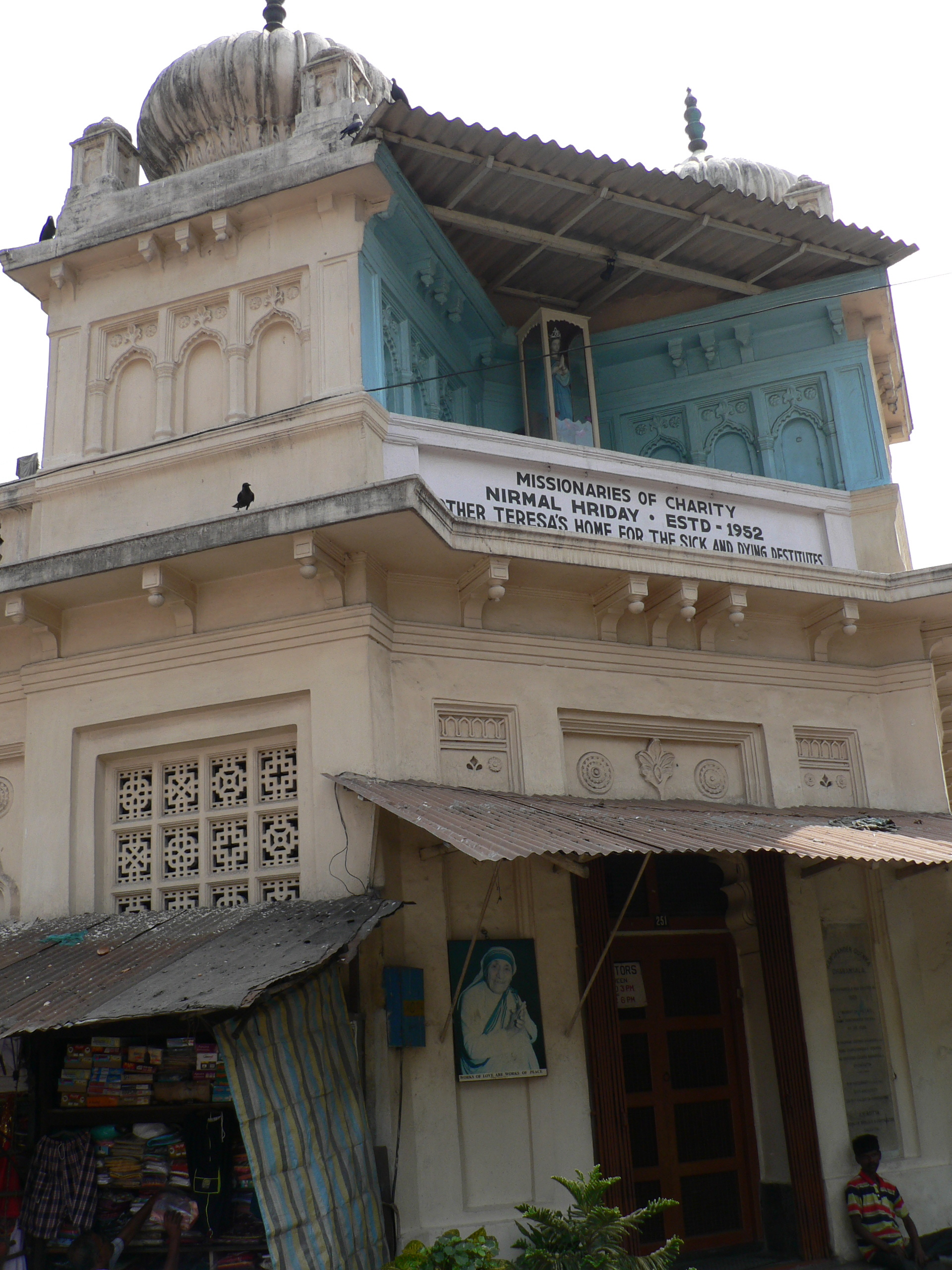
Missionaries of Charity hospice

- The 52nd Division and the 53rd Division of China's People's Liberation Army, with 40,000 troops, invaded Eastern Tibet (Kham), and swiftly overran the "7,000 or 8,000 badly-trained and ill-equipped Tibetan troops", killing 5,700 of them at Chamdo.
- By a vote of 47 to 5, the United Nations General Assembly approved Resolution 376(V), calling for unification of Korea, and authorizing the United Nations forces to cross the 38th Parallel.
- Mother Teresa's Roman Catholic order in India, the Missionaries of Charity, received approval from Pope Pius XII. She would say later that the fact that the document was received (the same day) on the Feast of Our Lady of the Rosary "seemed to be a sign from heaven".
- Baseball's New York Yankees beat the Philadelphia Phillies, 5–2, to win the 1950 World Series in a four-game sweep. The Phils had narrowly lost each of the first three games, 1–0, 2–1, and 3–2.
- The United States Seventh Fleet was given Operation Order 7-50, directing that its units were not to participate in the defense of any coastal islands held by the Republic of China on Taiwan.
- Walter Bedell Smith became the new Director of Central Intelligence.
- Born: Jakaya Kikwete, President of Tanzania 2005–2015; in Msoga, Tanganyika.

== October 8, 1950 (Sunday) ==
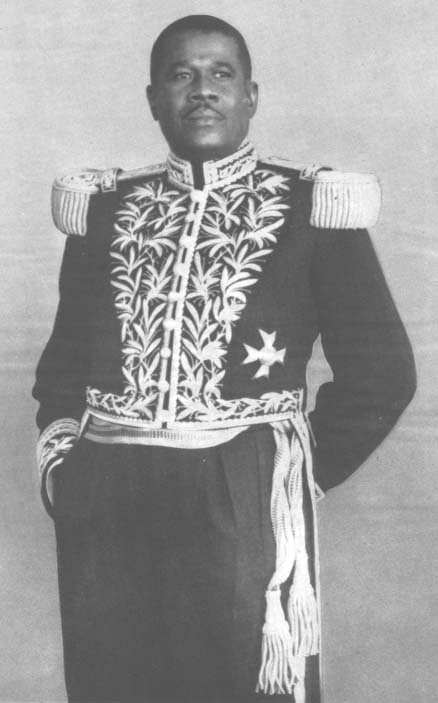
Magloire

- Two United States Air Force F-80 fighter-bombers flew more than 60 miles into the Soviet Union and, at 4:17 pm local time, strafed parked airplanes of the 821st Interceptor Aviation Regiment at the Sukhaya Rechka airbase. Fortunately, there were no injuries, and the regiment commander did not pursue the invaders. The United States formally apologized to the Soviet Union on October 18, and offered to pay for the damage, but no response was made to the offer.
- The day after the United Nations had endorsed the unification of Korea, China's Mao Zedong ordered the creation of the People's Volunteer Army and directed General Peng Dehuai to prepare to invade North Korea.
- In the Haitian general election, Colonel Paul Magloire, recently resigned from the military junta governing the nation, was elected president against token opposition.
- Jogendra Nath Mandal, the Minister of Law and Labour for Pakistan and one of the nation's founders, resigned in protest over the treatment of Hindu minorities, and moved to India. Mandal had been the highest ranking Hindu official in the predominantly Muslim nation.

== October 9, 1950 (Monday) ==
- The Goyang Geumjeong Cave Massacre began. By the end of the month, over 153 unarmed civilians would be killed by police officers in Goyang, in the Gyeonggi-do district of South Korea.
- The Joint Chiefs of Staff sent a telegram to General MacArthur, advising him that "in the event of the open or covert employment anywhere in Korea of major Chinese Communist units, without prior announcement, you should continue the action as long as, in your judgment, action by forces now under your control offers a reasonable chance of success", but added that "you will obtain authorization from Washington prior to taking any military action against objectives in Chinese territory."

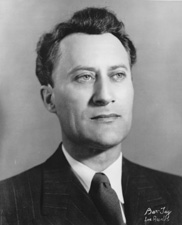
U.S. Senator Taylor

- The government of Prime Minister Clement Attlee announced that the United Kingdom's nationalization of the British iron and steel industry would take effect on February 15, pursuant to legislation that had passed the previous December. The move affected 92 private companies. The Iron and Steel Corporation would be dissolved in the denationalization of 1953, but renationalization would take place effective July 28, 1967.
- The conviction and 180-day jail sentence of incumbent U.S. Senator Glen H. Taylor of Idaho was upheld after the United States Supreme Court declined to review his case. Senator Taylor's crime had been to scuffle with police in Birmingham, Alabama, when he had walked through a door marked "Negro Entrance" in order to attend a meeting of African-American students. Taylor did not serve any time, despite threats by Birmingham's police chief, Bull Connor, to have him extradited from Idaho to Alabama. Senator Taylor did, however, lose his bid for re-election 30 days later. On November 14, he paid off his $200 bond and $28.60 in court costs.
- Outnumbered 10 to 1, several battalions of French army troops in Vietnam were killed, wounded, or taken prisoner by Viet Minh guerrillas after retreating from the garrison at Cao Bằng.
- Born: Jody Williams, American teacher and aid worker, recipient of the 1997 Nobel Peace Prize; in Rutland, Vermont

== October 10, 1950 (Tuesday) ==
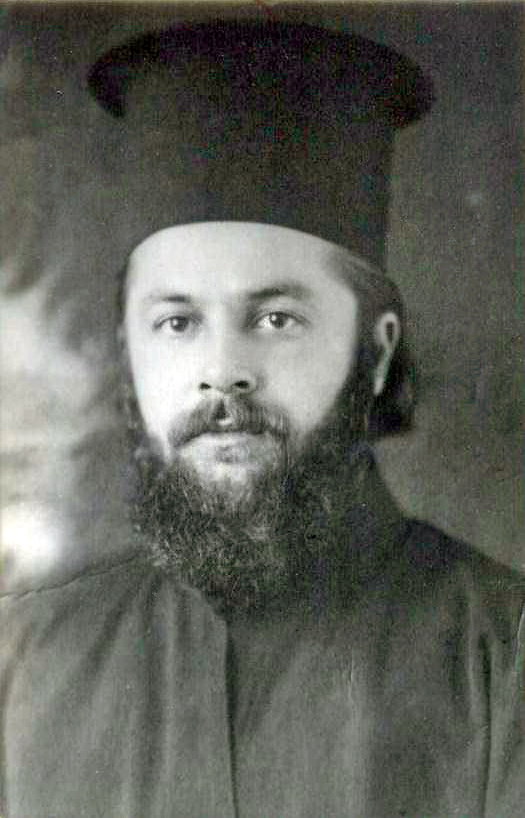
Patriarch Kiril

- The Politburo of Bulgaria's Communist Party issued its Statutes of the Church and declared the Metropolitan Kiril of Plovdiv to be its nominee to serve as the Patriarch of All Bulgaria upon the revision of the Bulgarian Orthodox Church.
- The National Academy of Sciences announced the discovery of keeping bread fresh for several months, without refrigeration, by irradiating it with "a beam of electrons of nearly a million volt power". According to the NAS press release, "The atomic preserver will work for any kind of bread." The statement did not include information about whether the bread would be safe to eat.
- The Boulton Paul P.111 experimental aircraft made its maiden flight, at Boscombe Down, UK.
- Born: Nora Roberts (pen name J. D. Robb), American romance novelist; as Eleanor Robertson in Silver Spring, Maryland
- Died: General Vladimir Kirpichnikov of the Soviet Army, 47, was executed for treason after having been kept as a prisoner of war by Finland until 1944. He had been accused of collaborating with his Finnish captors about the location of Soviet forces in the area.

== October 11, 1950 (Wednesday) ==
- By a vote of 5 to 2, the Federal Communications Commission issued the first license to broadcast television in color, to CBS. The field-sequential color system developed by Hungarian American engineer Dr. Peter Goldmark would become the first color television system to be adopted for commercial use, but would be abandoned a year later, in large part because its signal could not be picked up on ordinary black and white television sets without the purchase of an adapter that would cost at least fifteen dollars (equivalent to almost $150 in 2015 dollars). Initially, the CBS color sets would be priced at a minimum of $200, or $1,980 in 2015.
- General Douglas MacArthur was authorized to organize a civil administration for the Ryukyu Islands of Japan.
- Gustav Heinemann resigned from his post as Federal Minister of the Interior for West Germany, in protest over the rearmament plans of Chancellor Konrad Adenauer. Heinemann, who would found the Emergency Society for the Peace of Europe a year later, would later serve as ceremonial President of West Germany from 1969 to 1974.
- The government of North Korea rejected a demand from the United Nations that it surrender, and a broadcast was made from Pyongyang declaring that army commander Kim Il Sung had asked for "the entire People's Army, partisans and all people to fight until the final day of victory."
- Died: Pauline Lord, 60, American stage actress who starred in the title role of the W. C. Fields film Mrs. Wiggs of the Cabbage Patch, was killed in an automobile accident

== October 12, 1950 (Thursday) ==
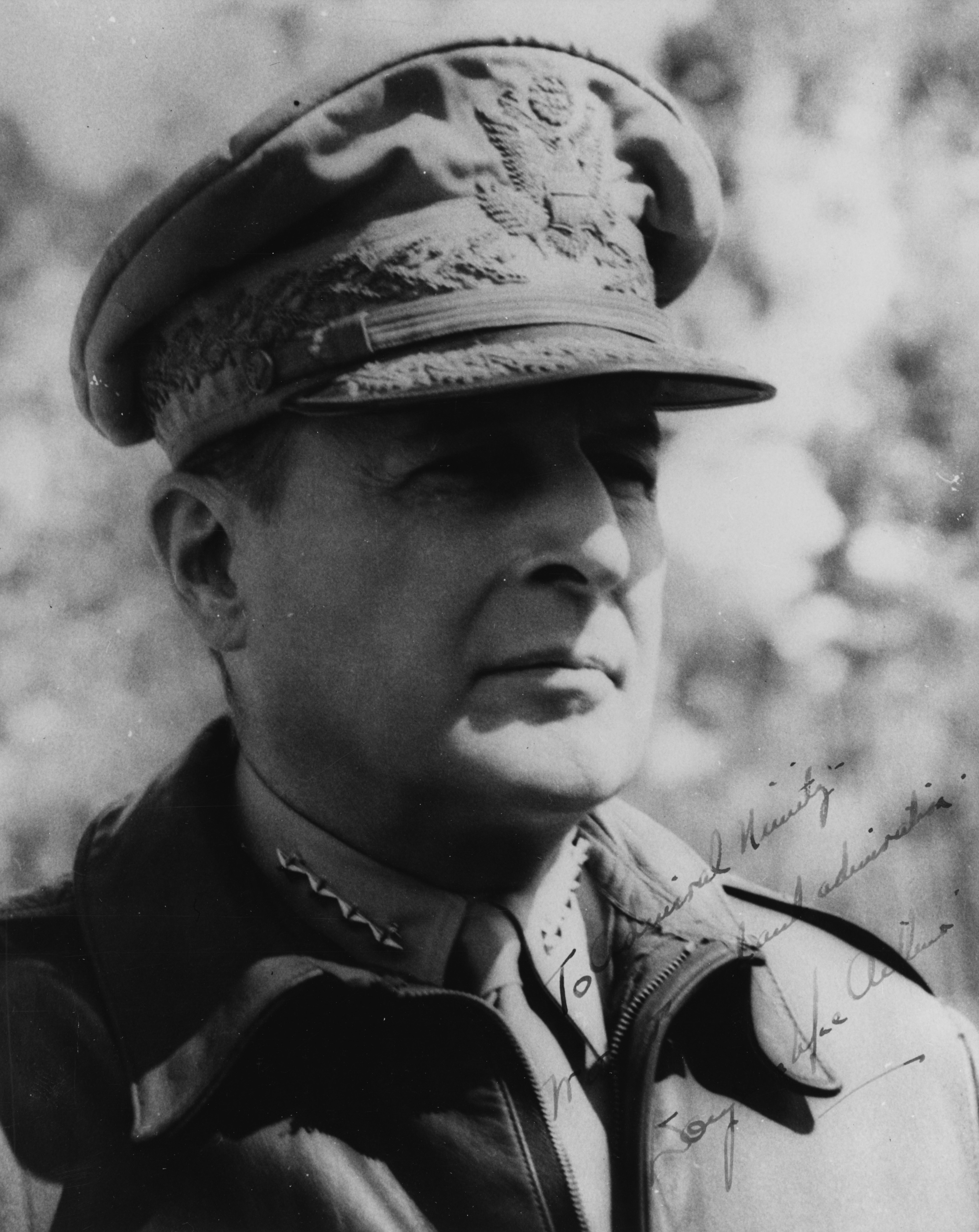
MacArthur, new administrator of occupied North Korea

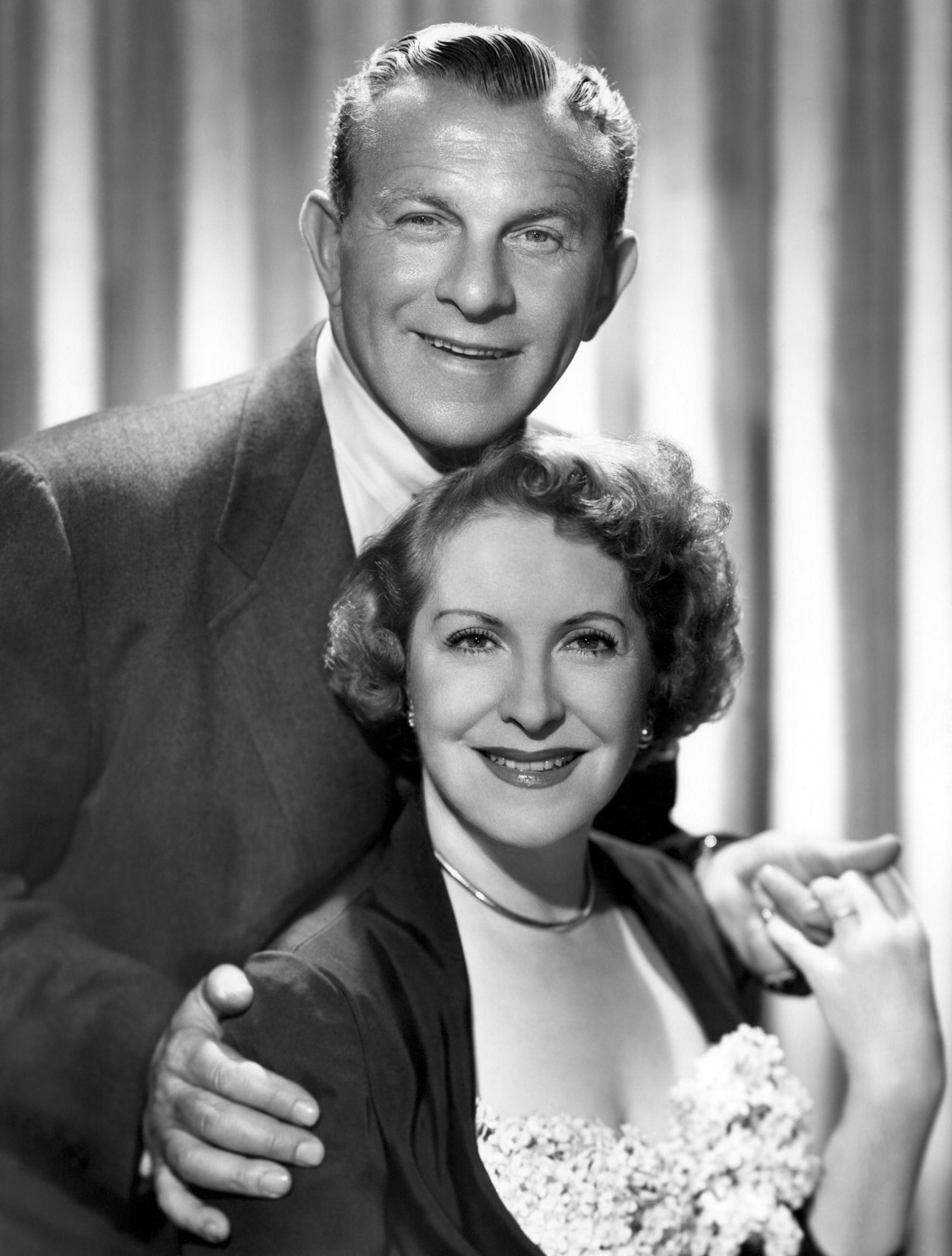
Burns and Allen

- U.S. President Harry S. Truman was provided with a top secret report from the CIA's Office of Research and Estimates. Threat of Full Chinese Intervention in Korea (ORE 58-50) stated that "Despite statements by Chou Enlai, troop movements to Manchuria, and propaganda charges of atrocities and border violations... there are no convincing indications of an actual Chinese Communist intention to resort to full-scale intervention in Korea", and that "such action is not probable in 1950" and that "the most favorable time for intervention in Korea has passed".
- The United Nations General Assembly voted for General MacArthur to be the administrator of all UN held territory in North Korea, while South Korea President Syngman Rhee would continue to have authority over territory below the 38th Parallel.
- Two U.S. Navy minesweepers were sunk in the course of attempting to clear floating sea mines from North Korea's Wonsan Harbor as part of Operation Wonsan, a squadron of U.S. Navy warships came into conflict with Korean People's Army (KPA) batteries. Six U.S. Navy men died, and 43 more were wounded in the blast that sank USS Pirate and USS Pledge. When carrier planes attempted to drop bombs as a method of clearing the mines, it was "discovered that even a 1,000-pound bomb will not set off a mine". The remaining vessels and aircraft silenced the enemy guns.
- Turkey entered the Korean War with the arrival of an advance party of the Turkish Brigade at Pusan. The remaining 5,190 troops arrived five days later.
- The George Burns and Gracie Allen Show premiered on the CBS television network after the husband and wife comedy team became the latest to make a transition from radio. The radio program had run for 13 years as The Burns and Allen Show. Gracie Allen reportedly was "petrified" during the initial live broadcast because she had never had to memorize her lines before; on the radio, she was always able to read from her script without being seen by the home audience.
- Born:
  - Takeshi Kaga, Japanese actor; as Shigekatsu Katsuta in Kanazawa
  - Edward Bloor, American novelist of young adult fiction; in Trenton, New Jersey;
- Died: Bill Cannastra, 29, a central figure in the Beat Generation, was killed in a freak accident when he tried to leave a subway car by climbing through its window. The train departed the Bleecker Street station in New York before Cannastra could complete his exit, and he was killed by his impact with the subway tunnel.

== October 13, 1950 (Friday) ==
- In Japan, the government announced the lifting of restrictions against 10,090 business, governmental and political leaders who had been purged from their positions of power after World War II, including future prime minister Nobusuke Kishi. In the ten months that followed, there would be three more waves of "depurging" of 83,287 more people.
- The Politburo of the Chinese Communist Party held an emergency meeting to reconsider its earlier decision to send Chinese forces into North Korea, in light of news that the Soviet Union was not going to provide its air force for at least a month. Eventually, Peng Dehuai and Gao Gang overcame the objections voiced by Prime Minister Zhou Enlai and the invasion continued.
- The drama film All About Eve starring Bette Davis, Anne Baxter, George Sanders and Celeste Holm was released.
- Died:
  - Master Sergeant John R. Wilson became the first U.S. Counterintelligence Corps officer to be killed in the Korean War. Alerted to an attack by enemy guerrilla forces on the small town of Pangso-ri, Wilson organized his contingent of 30 Korean police and interpreters into a defensive force. Taking with him four Koreans, Wilson personally led an attack on a house containing enemy troops. Wilson would posthumously be awarded the Silver Star.
  - Ernest Haycox, 51, author of Westerns, ten of which were adapted to cowboy films like Stagecoach and Union Pacific

== October 14, 1950 (Saturday) ==
- The Thirteenth Corps of China's People's Volunteer Army marched across the Yalu River that marked the border between China and North Korea, becoming the first of hundreds of thousands of Chinese troops to invade the Korean Peninsula. Dirk Stikker, the Foreign Minister of the Netherlands, received a cable from his chargé d'affaires in Beijing, announcing that four combat divisions had crossed the border. Stikker immediately notified the U.S. Ambassador, Selden Chapin, who reported the news to the U.S. Department of State.
- The second Tacoma Narrows Bridge opened to traffic, replacing the previous span that had collapsed in a storm on November 7, 1940, four months after it had opened. The $18,000,000 structure was the third longest suspension bridge in the world at that time, and was nicknamed "Sturdy Gertie" in contrast to the previous bridge, dubbed "Galloping Gertie".
- Hermann Flade, 18, was caught in the act of posting fliers objecting to the undemocratic nature of the 1950 general election in the German Democratic Republic (GDR), an offence for which he would be tried, convicted, and (initially) sentenced to death.
- In Denmark's parliamentary elections, the Social Democratic Party remained the largest in the Folketing, with 59 of the 151 seats.

== October 15, 1950 (Sunday) ==
- East Germany held its first national elections, with voting to take place for the Parliament and for regional, local and communal legislative bodies. In what was referred to as "the most democratic" elections ever held in Germany, and various political parties were identified, voters were asked to vote "yes" or "no" on a slate of candidates that had been drawn up by the Communist-dominated National Front. The choice was to approve or reject all candidates on the ballot. According to official figures, there was an 87.44% turnout of eligible voters, and 99.72% of them voted "yes" for the candidates. Otto Grotewohl was made the nation's first Prime Minister following the election.
- U.S. President Truman and U.S. Army General MacArthur met for a conference at Wake Island, after Truman's plane arrived at 6:30 in the morning local time (1:30 pm Saturday in Washington). The two posed for photographs, then rode together in "a battered Chevrolet sedan" to the conference site at a "small, new one-story concrete and frame office hut", where they conferred for two hours.
- Appearing as a guest on NBC's Meet the Press, New York Governor Thomas E. Dewey announced that he would never run again for President of the United States, and that he would endorse General Dwight D. Eisenhower as the nominee of the Republican Party, even though Eisenhower had not declared his party affiliation. Dewey had been the nominee for president in both the 1944 and 1948 presidential elections.
- Across the River and into the Trees by Ernest Hemingway topped The New York Times Fiction Best Seller list.

== October 16, 1950 (Monday) ==
- C. S. Lewis's novel The Lion, the Witch and the Wardrobe, the first of The Chronicles of Narnia series, was first published, released by British publisher Geoffrey Bles, followed by Macmillan Publishers in the United States on November 7. Lewis had completed the book at the end of March, 1949.
- At 6:00 pm local time, a reconnaissance team from the 42nd Army of China's People's Volunteers crossed the Ji'an Bridge over the Yalu River and moved 60 miles into Korea, followed by the PVA's 370th regiment of the 124th Division that crossed the river at another bridge at Ji'an-Manpu, advancing 20 miles. Combined, these have been described as "the first Chinese combat troops to enter North Korea."

== October 17, 1950 (Tuesday) ==
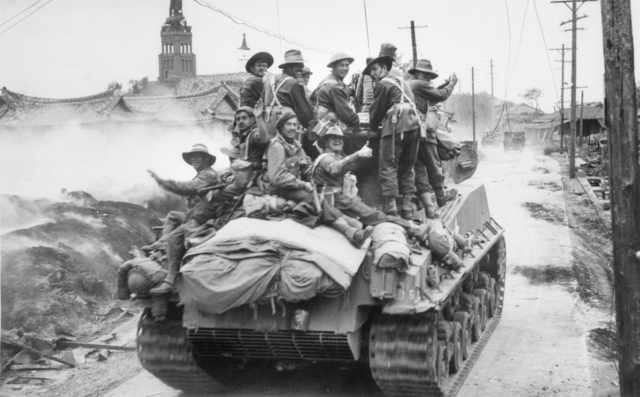
Australian soldiers in Sariwon

- The Battle of Sariwon began in Korea when the 27th British Commonwealth Brigade under Brigadier Basil Coad—–comprising the 1st Battalion, the Argyll and Sutherland Highland Regiment, the 1st Battalion, the Middlesex Regiment and 3rd Battalion, the Royal Australian Regiment—–captured the town of Sariwon. North Korean casualties included 215 killed and more than 3,700 captured, whilst British-Commonwealth losses were 1 killed and 3 wounded (all from the Argylls).
- What North Korea now refers to as the Sinchon Massacre began in the North Korean provincial subdivision of Sinchon. North Korean histories claim that U.S. and United Nations military forces murdered more than 35,000 civilians— about one-fourth of Sinchon's population over the course of 52 days before a counterattack by Chinese and North Korean forces.
- The Battle of Pyongyang began.
- The United States pledged to spend between 1.8 billion and 2.4 billion dollars in military aid to French forces in Europe and Indochina before the end of 1951. The money, agreed to in conferences between the U.S. Department of Defense and the French Ministries of Defense and Finance, would come from a six billion dollar fund that Congress had appropriated to rearm American allies to defend against Communist aggression.
- A British European Airways Douglas DC-3 airplane crashed shortly after takeoff at 3:00 pm, en route from London to Glasgow. The twin-engined plane lost power in the starboard engine and lost altitude as it flew back to Northolt Airport, clipping beech trees and telephone wires before crashing into a garden wall in the London suburb of Mill Hill. All 24 passengers and four of the five member crew were killed.
- Ivor Novello's latest musical, Gay's the Word, was premièred in Manchester, UK.
- Born: Wally Lamb, American novelist, known for She's Come Undone, I Know This Much Is True, and The River Is Waiting; in Norwich, Connecticut

== October 18, 1950 (Wednesday) ==
- The International Convention for the Protection of Birds was signed in Paris. It would come into effect on January 17, 1963.
- The moshav of Bar Giora was founded by Yemeni immigrants to Israel.
- Born:
  - Wendy Wasserstein, American playwright (The Heidi Chronicles); in Brooklyn (d. 2006)
  - Om Puri, Indian film actor; in Patiala, Punjab (d. 2017)

== October 19, 1950 (Thursday) ==
- United Nations troops won the Battle of Pyongyang, as American troops from the United States Army's 1st Cavalry became the first U.S. forces to march into Pyongyang, the capital of North Korea. After fighting a final battle with North Korean forces at Chunghwa, the cavalry drove the remaining ten miles to find that the city was nearly deserted.
- Hours later, General Peng Dehuai, accompanied by an assistant and two bodyguards, traveled across the Yalu River between Dandong, China, and Sinuiju, North Korea, then ordered the bulk of the People's Volunteer Army to advance. As dusk fell at 5:30 p.m., the mass invasion of North Korea from China got underway, with 255,000 Chinese troops crossing the Yalu River over three different bridges.
- Ngabo Ngawang Jigme, the Governor of Eastern Tibet and the commander of Tibetan troops, surrendered the Kham province to China's General Wang Chimi.
- Future Prime Minister Pierre Mendès France made the first of many speeches in the French National Assembly, advocating that France end its war in Vietnam and negotiate a cease fire with the Communists. He would end the French involvement shortly after taking office in 1954 as the premier.
- Died:
  - Edna St. Vincent Millay, 58, American poet
  - Charles Ballantyne, 83, Canadian politician who served as Leader of the Opposition in the Canadian Senate during World War II

== October 20, 1950 (Friday) ==
- Australia passed the Communist Party Dissolution Act, which would later be struck down by the High Court.
- In the first large-scale paratrooper mission of the Korean War, 2,800 men of the U.S. Army's 187th Airborne Regimental Combat Team parachuted into the areas of Sukchon and Sunchon to the north of Pyongyang on a rescue mission, and killed or captured 6,000 North Koreans. A group of 89 American prisoners of war, who had been removed to an area ten miles north of Sunchon, were taken to a cornfield for execution. Twenty-one were able to escape, but another 68 were machine-gunned to death.
- The foreign ministers of the Soviet Union and the other Eastern European nations met in Prague, Czechoslovakia, and proposed a German reunification plan that would have an equal number of delegates for East and West Germany as part of a temporary government. The plan would be rejected by the western nations on December 22.
- Born: Tom Petty, American rock musician; in Gainesville, Florida (d. 2017)
- Died: Henry L. Stimson, 83, U.S. Secretary of State (1929–1933), U.S. Secretary of War (1940–1945), and former Governor-General of the Philippines (1927–1929)

== October 21, 1950 (Saturday) ==
- In the first clash between the armies of Communist China and South Korea, a division of the Chinese 40th Army encountered and overwhelmed a unit of Republic of Korea soldiers near Bukjin.
- The Battle of Yongju began as part of the United Nations offensive towards the Yalu River.
- Various provisions of the Fourth Geneva Convention (for the Amelioration of the Condition of the Wounded and Sick in Armed Forces in the Field; for the Amelioration of the Condition of the Wounded, Sick and Shipwrecked Members of Armed Forces at Sea; and relative to the Protection of Civilian Persons in Time of War) all adopted on August 12, 1949, and eventually adopted by 192 nations, entered into force.
- The Saturday Evening Post ran an investigative report by William L. Worden, entitled "UCLA's Red Cell: Case History of College Communism". While not actually accusing the University of California, Los Angeles (UCLA) of being plagued by Communists, Worden reported that the "poor-boy's college" offered the opportunity for Communist infiltration, and cited student protests against racial discrimination as examples of the red influence. Worden conceded that there were "probably no more than 50 Communist Party members" in the 17,000 member school, but added that "this small group-- call it branch or cell or faction-- has been able to give the entire University a damaging reputation." The report added to calls for investigation of the entire California state university system.
- Born: Ronald McNair, African-American astronaut who was killed in the explosion of the Space Shuttle Challenger; in Lake City, South Carolina (d. 1986)

== October 22, 1950 (Sunday) ==
- On the day that the Internal Security Act of 1950 (popularly known as the McCarran Act) went into effect, the United States Department of Justice began a series of "midnight raids" across the nation, arresting resident aliens who were suspected of subversive activities.
- The Battle of Yongju was won by the United Nations forces.
- The Abuna Basilios (born Gebre Gyorgis Wolde Tsadik) was selected as the first Ethiopian-born Patriarch of the Ethiopian Orthodox Tewahedo Church.
- The 1950 Norwegian Football Cup was won by Fredrikstad FK, for the sixth time.
- Born: Donald Ramotar, President of Guyana 2011–2015; in Caria-Caria, British Guiana

== October 23, 1950 (Monday) ==
- Two surgeons from the University of Toronto College of Medicine, Dr. W. G. Bigelow and Dr. J. C. Callaghan, presented their findings of their successful development of a heart pacemaker that could be implanted into an individual. Their paper was presented in Boston at the annual meeting of the American College of Surgeons.
- Film actor Errol Flynn was served with a criminal summons on the day of his marriage to Patrice Wymore in Monaco, and charged with the rape of a 16-year-old girl a year earlier. The young lady, a resident of Monte Carlo, had accused Flynn of luring her aboard his yacht and then sexually assaulting her. After more than a year, the Monocan court would dismiss the charges after concluding that there was no evidence to support the accusations.

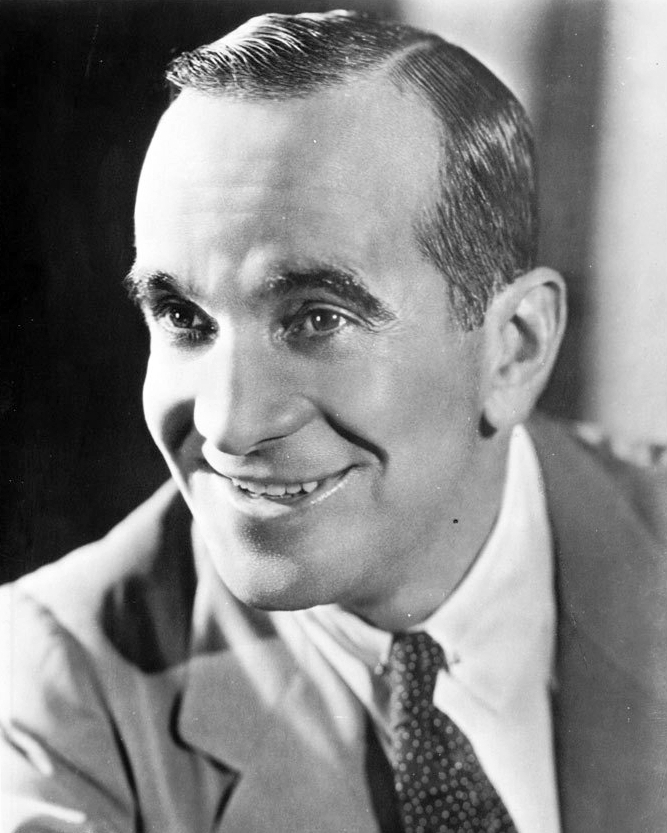
Jolson

- In an address at the United Nations, Soviet Foreign Minister Andrei Y. Vishinsky called upon the world's nations to adopt a resolution outlawing nuclear weapons, as well as a declaration, that the leaders of any government that used the bomb first would be tried as war criminals.
- The government of the People's Republic of China officially accepted an invitation to send a representative to the United Nations Security Council, for the first time since the Communist government had been established at Beijing in 1949. General Wu Xiuquan would speak on behalf of the Communists.
- Died: Al Jolson, 64, American musician once known as "The World's Greatest Actor", best known for starring in the first sound film, The Jazz Singer. A month earlier, Jolson had become the first major entertainer to travel to Korea to boost the morale of U.S. soldiers there. Reportedly, Jolson was playing the card game gin rummy with friends at his suite at the Hotel St. Francis when he suffered his fatal heart attack

== October 24, 1950 (Tuesday) ==
- René Pleven, the Prime Minister of France, addressed the National Assembly in Paris and proposed the creation of a multinational "European Army" as part of what he described as the Communauté européenne de défense (European Defence Community). The "Pleven Plan" would be rejected by the legislators, but in 2004, the various members of the European Union would agree upon cooperation of their nation's armed forces in conjunction with a European Defence Agency.
- Without prior consultation with Washington, and in disregard of the Joint Chiefs of Staff order of September 30, General MacArthur ordered a general advance of the 8th and 10th U.S. Armies toward the border with China.
- The Netherlands entered the Korean War, as an advance party of the Netherlands Battalion arrived, with the remainder joining them on November 23. In all, there were two infantry companies and one heavy weapons company comprising 636 men, and a few nurses (→ Regiment van Heutsz). The Battalion soldiers would be assigned to the U.S. 38th Infantry Regiment in December.
- Daily television broadcasting began in Cuba, as Union Radio TV inaugurated its regular schedule on Channel 4 in Havana. President Carlos Prío Socarrás guided the ceremonies from his office at the Presidential Palace.
- In an Australian government reshuffle, Eric Harrison, MP, moved from Defence to the Interior, changing places with MP Philip McBride.

== October 25, 1950 (Wednesday) ==
- The 7th Regiment of the 6th Division of the Republic of Korea Army (and its American advisor, Lt. Col. Harry Fleming) reached the Yalu River at Ch'osan, becoming the first group from the south to arrive at the border with China. The soldiers began firing artillery shells into Chinese territory after their arrival.
- The Battle of Onjong, the first major battle in the Korean War between the Chinese and United Nations forces, began after Communist Chinese forces encountered a regiment of the 6th Division of the South Korean Army.
- The Festival Ballet, founded by Alicia Markova and Anton Dolin, and later to become the English National Ballet, gave its first public performance.
- The Battle of Kujin and the Battle of Unsan began.

== October 26, 1950 (Thursday) ==
- The United Kingdom House of Commons building was used for the first time since its destruction in a German air raid on May 10, 1941.
- The government of India ruled out military intervention in the Chinese invasion of Tibet, and advised China that it would limit its response to diplomacy.
- The Battle of Kujin ended with the United Nations winning.

== October 27, 1950 (Friday) ==
- Meeting in the territory of a former "princely state" that was claimed by both India and Pakistan after the breakup of British India, the Jammu & Kashmir National Conference approved a resolution for the election of a constituent assembly, elected by voters from both nations, to determine the future of the area. By 1954, the assembly would vote to become a state in India.
- Pedro Albizu Campos, an advocate of the independence of Puerto Rico from the United States, made the decision to begin a planned insurrection after police had rounded up four of his followers and had discovered a Thompson submachine gun, three handguns, and five Molotov cocktails. Campos, leader of the Nationalist Party, spent the rest of the morning ordering the action to begin ahead of schedule, before being arrested at his home.

== October 28, 1950 (Saturday) ==
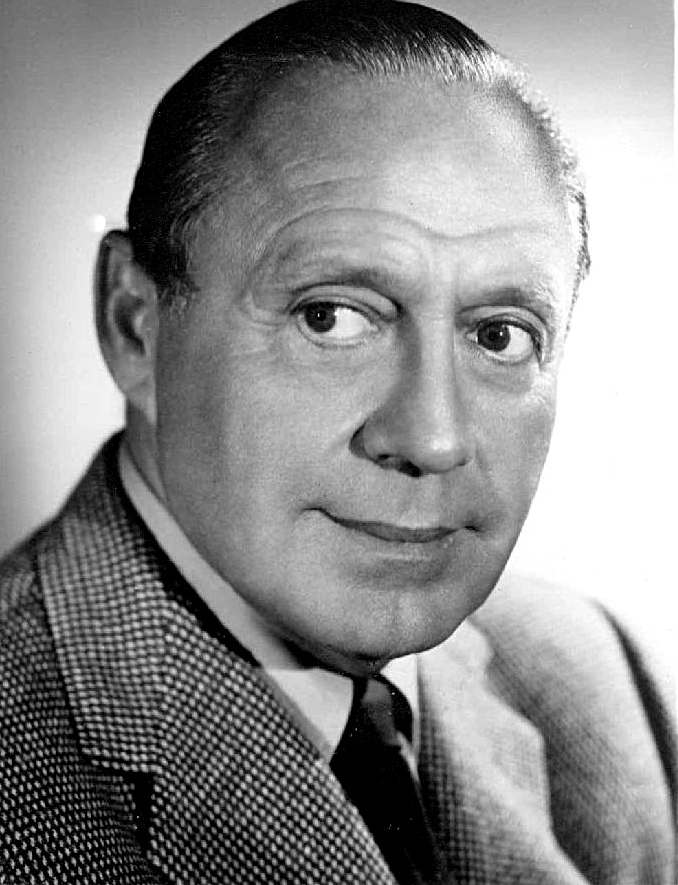
Benny

- Radio and film comedian Jack Benny brought his show to television with the premiere of a live broadcast from New York of The Jack Benny Program, opening with the one-liner "I'd give a million dollars to know what I look like on television." He and his supporting cast would continue the radio show for five more years, and his TV program, sponsored by Lucky Strike cigarettes, would run until 1964, winning eight Emmy awards along the way.
- The Communist government of Poland carried out a currency reform, with every 100 złoty being replaced by one "new złoty" note from the National Bank of Poland. At the same time, prices and wages were adjusted at the rate of three of the new złoty for every 100 old złoty, effectively removing two-thirds of money from circulation.
- Near Bennington, Vermont, Freida Langer became the fifth and last victim in a series of "Bennington Triangle" disappearances of hikers at the base of Glastenbury Mountain. Starting on November 12, 1945, a 75-year-old hunting guide, an 18-year-old Bennington College student, a 65-year-old retired soldier and an 8-year-old boy (who had gone missing on October 12, 1950) vanished, and their bodies were never found. Ms. Langer's decomposed remains would be discovered on May 12, 1951, but the cause of her death would never be determined.
- In the Scottish League Cup Final, Motherwell F.C. defeated favourites Hibernian F.C. 3–0 to win the title for the first time in their history.
- Born: Sihem Bensedrine, Tunisian journalist and women's rights and human rights activist; in La Marsa

== October 29, 1950 (Sunday) ==
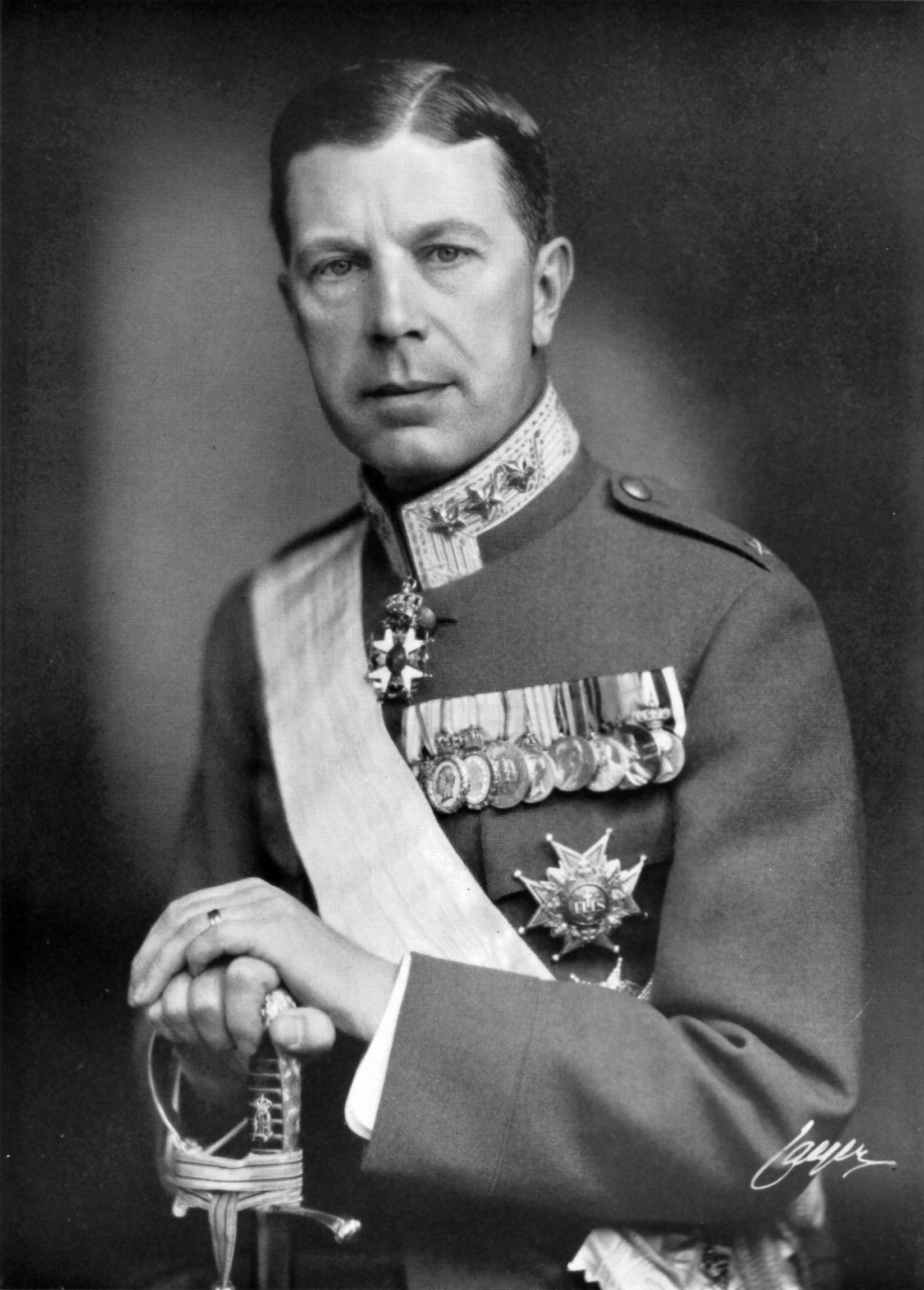
Gustav VI

- Gustav VI Adolf, 68, became King of Sweden on the death of his father.
- Korean War:
- The Battle of Onjong was won by the Chinese over the United Nations forces.
- The Battle of Chongju began as part of the United Nations offensive towards the Yalu River.
- The 1950 NASCAR Grand National Series concluded with Julian Buesink winning the Owners' Championship and Bill Rexford winning the Drivers' Championship.
- Born: Abdullah Gül, President of Turkey 2007 to 2014; in Kayseri
- Died:
  - King Gustav V of Sweden, 92, who reigned for almost 43 years after the 1907 death of his father, King Oscar II He was succeeded by his son, Gustaf VI Adolf.
  - Maurice Costello, 73, American vaudeville and silent film actor

== October 30, 1950 (Monday) ==
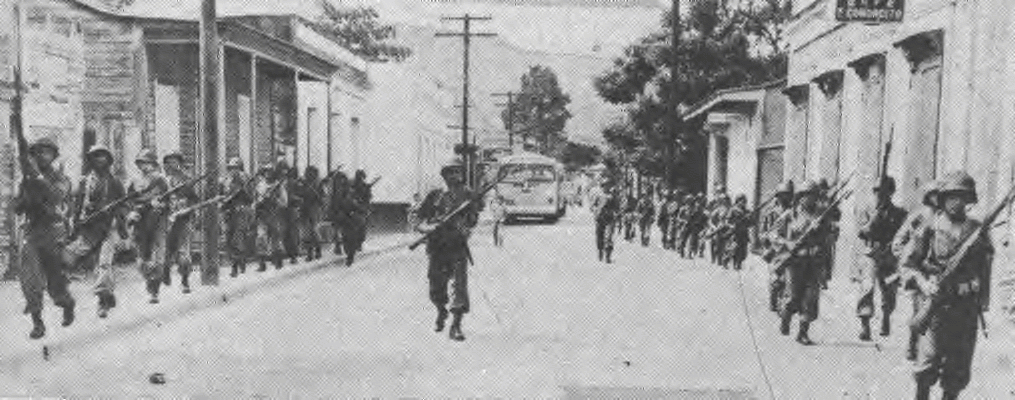
National Guard responds to Jayuya

- The Jayuya Uprising began when Blanca Canales and other members of the Puerto Rican Nationalist Party attacked the police station in the small town of Jayuya, Puerto Rico, killing all six policemen there and then burning down the building and blocking the surrounding roads. Word of the attack set off similar actions in nine other cities in the island territory that was administered by the United States. Police stations in Peñuelas, Ponce, Utuado and Arecibo, with more violence at Naranjito and Mayagüez. Shots were fired at La Fortaleza, the residence of island Governor Luis Muñoz Marín in the capital at San Juan, killing a guard. The Puerto Rican National Guard counter-attacked, with airplanes strafing Jayuya and Utuado. By the end of the week, after 28 people were killed and 22 others wounded, order was restored, and the government arrested 2,000 people who had supported independence.
- The Battle of Chongju concluded, as Australian forces entered the town and cleared out the remaining North Korean troops. Australian commander Lieutenant Colonel Charles Hercules Green died two days later of his wounds.
- Erik Eriksen became the new Prime Minister of Denmark after forming a coalition government of legislators from his Venstre party and the Conservative People's Party of outgoing premier Hans Hedtoft.
- Born: Louise DuArt, American comedian and voice impersonator; in Quincy, Massachusetts

== October 31, 1950 (Tuesday) ==
- Earl Lloyd became the first African-American to play in a National Basketball Association game. One of four black players in the newly integrated NBA, Lloyd played for the Washington Capitols in the opener for the league's fifth season, at Rochester, New York, in the only game scheduled that night. Lloyd scored two field goals and two free throws in the Caps' 78–70 loss to the Rochester Royals.
- For the second time in two weeks, 28 people on a British European Airways flight were killed in an airliner crash at London. In the October 17 crash, 28 of 29 aboard a BEA DC-3 had died shortly after takeoff. Two weeks later, a Vickers 610 Viking with 26 passengers and 4 crew was approaching from Paris during a thick fog. An investigation concluded that the pilot had misjudged the amount of time that he had to abort the landing at London Airport. At 7:54 p.m., the plane struck Runway 28 with its landing gear retracted, became airborne again, then broke apart and exploded after crashing into a pile of iron pipes at the end of the runway. A stewardess and a passenger, both seated at the rear of the plane, were the only survivors.
- United States Secretary of Defense George C. Marshall authorized $50,000,000 for the construction of a secret manufacturing plant for the production of the nerve gas Sarin. Manufacture would begin at the plant, near Muscle Shoals, Alabama, in June, 1952.
- An oil pipeline linking Edmonton, Alberta, Canada, to Sarnia, Ontario, Canada, was completed.
- Born:
  - John Candy, Canadian comedian and actor; in Newmarket, Ontario (died 1994)
  - Jane Pauley, American television broadcaster and journalist on NBC's Today show and Dateline); in Indianapolis
