= 1897 Storrs Aggies football team =

American college football season

1897 Storrs Aggies football
- Conference: Athletic League of New England State Colleges
- Record: 5–2 (1–1 New England)
- Head coach: None
- Captain: N. J. Webb
- Home stadium: Athletic Fields

The 1897 Storrs Aggies football team represented Storrs Agricultural College, now the University of Connecticut, in the 1897 college football season. This was the second year that the school fielded a football team. The Aggies completed the season with a record of 5–2, playing for the first time as a member of the Athletic League of New England State Colleges, which served to facilitate scheduling between Connecticut, the University of Massachusetts Amherst and the University of Rhode Island. The 1897 season marked the first contests against these two rivals.

The team's manager was J. W. Pincus.

== Schedule ==
Date	Opponent	Site	Result	Source
October 2	at Norwich Free Academy*	Norwich, CT	L 4–12	
October 6	Willimantic YMCA*	Athletic Fields; Storrs, CT	W 16–0	
October 9	at New London A. C.*	New London, CT	W 10–8	
October 16	Willimantic High School*	Athletic Fields; Storrs, CT	W 10–4	
October 23	vs. Rhode Island	New London, CT (rivalry)	W 22–8	
October 30	Willimantic YMCA*	Athletic Fields; Storrs, CT	W 30–0	
November 6	at Massachusetts	Alumni Field; Amherst, MA (rivalry)	L 0–36	
*Non-conference game
