= Norwich Free Academy =

The Norwich Free Academy

Location
- 305 Broadway; Norwich, Connecticut 06360; United States; 41°32′13″N 72°04′52″W

Information
- Type: Independent day school
- Motto: Tradition & Innovation
- Established: 1854 (172 years ago)
- CEEB code: 070590
- Head of school: Nathan Quesnel
- Faculty: About 150
- Enrollment: 2,234 (2018–19)
- Colors: Red and white
- Athletics conference: Eastern Connecticut Conference
- Website: www.nfaschool.org

The Norwich Free Academy (NFA), founded in 1854 and in operation since 1856, is a coeducational independent school for students between the 9th and 12th grade. Located in Norwich, Connecticut, the Academy serves as the primary high school for Norwich and the surrounding towns of Canterbury, Bozrah, Voluntown, Sprague, Lisbon, Franklin, Preston, and Brooklyn. It was recognized by the U.S. Department of Education as a National Blue Ribbon School of Excellence in 2001.

Incorporated in 1855 by an act of the Connecticut Legislature, the Academy is an independent school and operates as a privately endowed educational institution that is governed by its board of trustees. One of the state's three endowed, independent academies, the Connecticut State Department of Education refers to the Academy as "a privately governed, endowed, regional independent school."

In addition to serving Norwich and surrounding communities, NFA also educates private tuition students. NFA is a member of the Connecticut Association of Independent Schools.

== History ==
The Norwich Free Academy was founded in 1854 as an alternative to sectarian educational practices of the 19th century. Its goal was to be accessible to both men and women across social classes, done through a blend of private endowment and public support. Construction of the Academy began soon after its founding, with the original building on Chelsea Parade. It began classes in 1856 with instruction in Latin, Greek, mathematics, English literature, history, natural philosophy, and the emerging sciences. There was also a strong emphasis on ethical instruction and civic engagement.

In 2017 the NFA administration protested against a Governor of Connecticut Dannel P. Malloy's Senate Bill 786, which requires trustees of any "incorporated or endowed high school or academy" to publicly post each "schedule, agenda and minutes of each meeting". SB 786 allows for area school districts that send students to NFA to have seats on the NFA board of representatives. It also allows public hearings and reviews by area boards of education of portions of NFA's budget, as well as the auditing the NFA revenues each year. The bill ultimately was modified; it continued to allow area boards of education to review the NFA budget and hold public hearings and requiring annual auditing, but the requirement that area school boards have representatives on the NFA board was removed. On March 24 the Education Committee of the Connecticut General Assembly approved this revised version. The NFA administration expressed satisfaction over this outcome.

== Campus ==
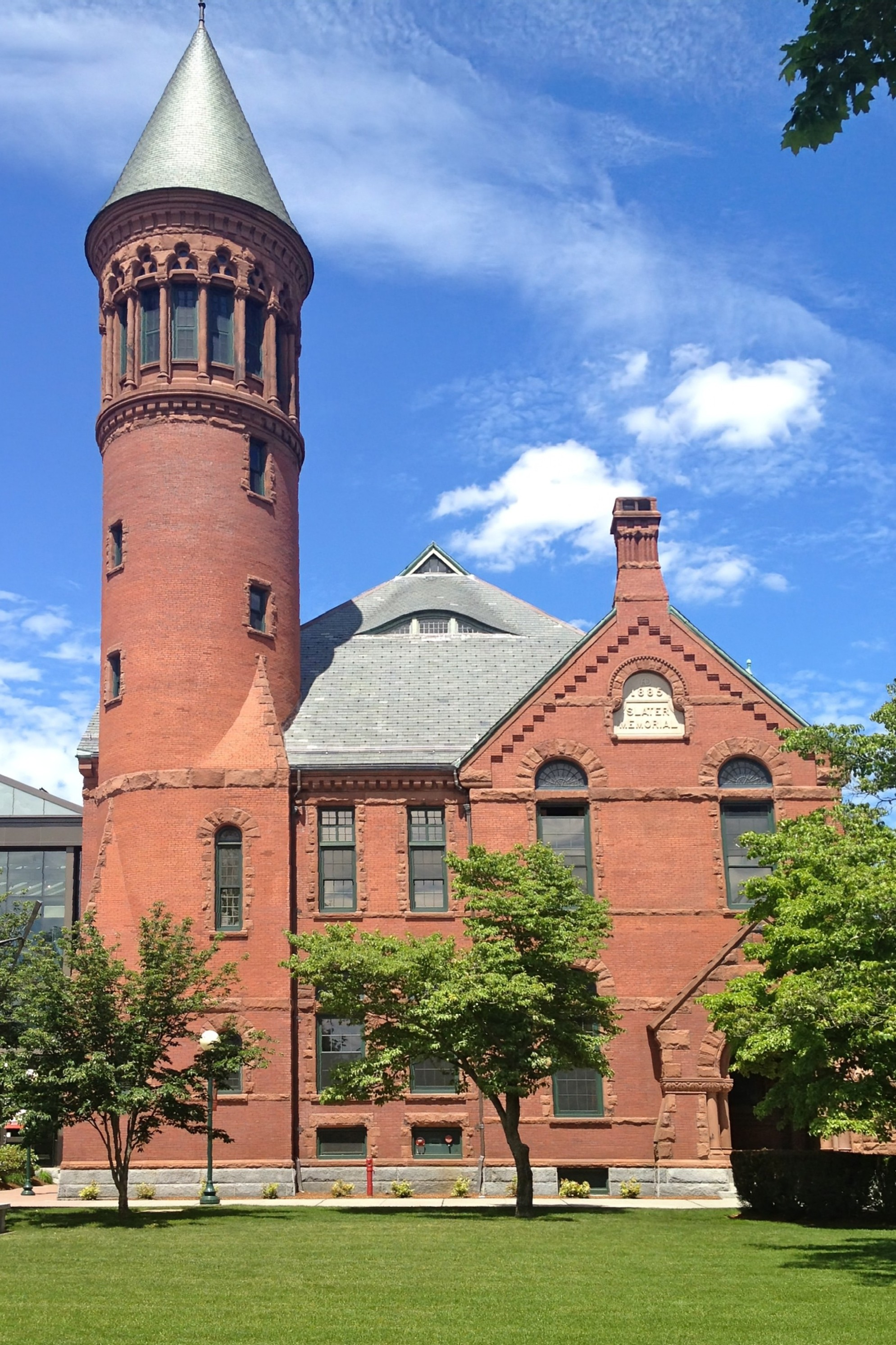
The Slater Memorial Museum in 2014

The 38-acre main campus contains seven buildings that are listed in the National Register of Historic Places, the most prominent being the Slater Memorial Museum.

== Varsity sport teams ==
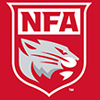
The NFA sports logo

- Baseball
- Basketball
- Cheerleading
- Cross country
- Dance team
- Fencing
- Field hockey
- Football
- Golf
- Hockey
- Lacrosse
- Soccer
- Softball
- Swimming
- Tennis
- Track and field
- Volleyball
- Wrestling

== Football rivalry ==
The oldest high school football rivalry in the United States is between Norwich Free Academy and New London High School. The first meeting between NFA and the Bulkeley School for Boys occurred on May 12, 1875; Bulkeley merged with Chapman Technical High School in 1951 to become New London High School and the rivalry with NFA continued. The games have been noncontinuous, interrupted by World War I and a 2-year hiatus after a brawl in 1951. Some years saw them play against each other more than once a season. The two teams played their 153rd game in November 2014.

== Notable alumni ==
- Dan Dale Alexander (1937) – nutrition quack known as "the Codfather"
- John-Manuel Andriote (1976) – author and journalist
- Allyn L. Brown (1901) – lawyer, judge, and Chief Justice of the Connecticut Supreme Court
- Eric Campbell (2005) – former professional baseball player (Oakland Athletics, Seattle Mariners)
- Andrew Carignan (2004) – former professional baseball player (San Francisco Giants)
- Charles Frederic Chapman (1900) – boater, editor, and writer
- Scott Chiasson (1995) – former professional baseball player
- Charles W. Comstock – Connecticut judge and United States Attorney for the District of Connecticut
- William J. Evans (1942) – Air Force general; former commander-in-chief of United States Air Forces in Europe
- John H. Fanning – lawyer; member and chairman of the National Labor Relations Board
- Sidney Frank (1938) – businessman
- Edwin W. Higgins – U.S. representative from Connecticut
- Henry Jerome (1935) – band leader and record company executive
- Henry Watson Kent – librarian and museum administrator; later became NFA faculty
- Bill Krohn (1976) – professional distance runner
- Wally Lamb (1968) – author (She's Come Undone, I Know This Much Is True)
- Edwin H. Land (1926) – scientist and inventor, co-founder of Polaroid
- Barbara Latham – painter, printer, children's book illustrator
- Dominic Leone (2009) – professional baseball player (San Francisco Giants)
- Joseph S. Longo – associate justice of the Connecticut Supreme Court
- Ida Mae Martinez – professional wrestler and yodeler
- John D. McWilliams – U.S. representative from Connecticut; transferred to Mercersburg Academy
- William J. Mills – jurist and last governor of New Mexico Territory
- Cathy Osten (1973) – Connecticut senator
- Robert J. Papp Jr. (1970) – Coast Guard admiral; former Commandant of the United States Coast Guard
- Don Pardo (1937) – television announcer (Saturday Night Live)
- Dewey H. Perry (1917), US Marshal for Vermont
- Samuel O. Prentice – Chief Justice of the Supreme Court of Connecticut
- Esther Rome – women's health activist, writer
- William Albert Setchell – botanist, marine phycologist
- Matt Shaughnessy (2005) – professional football player (New Orleans Saints)
- Tuzar Skipper (2014) – professional football player (Pittsburgh Steelers)
- William A. Slater – businessperson, art collector, philanthropist
- Maureen Sullivan - librarian, educator, organizational consultant, and 2012-2013 president of the American Library Association
- Dean Trantalis (1971) – mayor of Fort Lauderdale, Florida
- Edmund Asa Ware – educator, president of Atlanta University

== Notable faculty ==
- Paul Faulkner, artist
- Henry Watson Kent, librarian and museum administrator; also NFA alumnus
- Wally Lamb, author
- Alexey von Schlippe, artist

== See also ==
- List of high school football rivalries more than 100 years old

Other Connecticut private academies acting as public high schools:

- Gilbert School
- Woodstock Academy

Private academies in New Hampshire acting as public high schools:

- Coe-Brown Northwood Academy
- Pinkerton Academy

Private high schools in Maine which take students with public funds (from unorganized areas and/or with agreements with school districts):

- Foxcroft Academy
- Lee Academy
- Lincoln Academy
- George Stevens Academy
- Washington Academy
- Waynflete School
