= Henry Watson Kent =

American librarian (1866–1948)

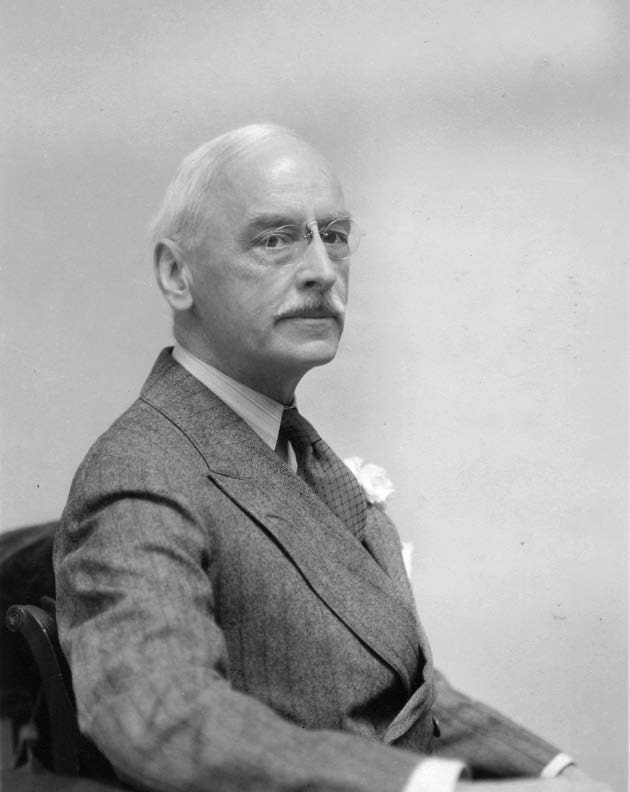
- Kent, c. 1924
- Born: September 28, 1866; Boston, United States
- Died: August 28, 1948 (aged 81)

Henry Watson Kent (September 28, 1866 – August 28, 1948) was an American librarian and museum administrator, "a great pioneer in American museum education and administration".

== Early life and education ==
Henry Watson Kent was born in Boston on September 28, 1866 to Robert Restiaux and Eliza (Watson) Kent. He attended the Boston Latin School and in 1881, the Free Academy of Norwich, Connecticut. During the summer of 1884, worked at the Boston Public Library where his interest in the library arts began.

He attended at Columbia College, where he was taught by Melvil Dewey. In 1920, he was awarded an honorary M.A. from Hamilton College and in 1932, a Doctor of Arts from Brown University.

== Career ==
=== Early career ===
Kent became librarian at the Norwich Free Academy's Peck Library in 1888, and became curator for 12 years at the adjacent Slater Memorial Museum. His techniques in displaying the Slater Museum's collection of casts and reproductions caught the eye of the Metropolitan Museum of Art. And in 1894, was commissioned to install its collection of plaster casts in the recently constructed north wing of the museum. In 1900, Kent started working at the New York Grolier Club, rising from assistant librarian to librarian in 1903. It was at the Grolier Club, where developed an interest in the art of printing.

=== Metropolitan Museum of Art ===
In 1905, Robert W. De Forest recruited Kent to the Metropolitan Museum of Art as Assistant Secretary, and in 1913 became Secretary of the Board of Trustees. When Kent first started at The Met, he found the museum to be lacking in organization and with limited tools or staffing for communication. So as Secretary, he began laying the foundations for the standard museum organization including: cataloging techniques mimicking the Dewey Decimal System; establishing the first photo studio to produce a visual record of each piece of art; conceived and initiated shows; and developed the procedures for the lending art in and out of the museum. He was also interested in graphic arts and communication creating the first Bulletin in 1905; established an editorial department; and installed the first printing press in the museum. The Bulletin began as a quarterly publication, eventually becoming a monthly with a circulation of 16,000. The Bulletin, books, and larger printing jobs were designed created by designers and frequently the museum had titles in the American Institute of Graphic Arts' Fifty Best Books of the Year exhibit. In 1928, the Pierpont Morgan Library arranged an exhibition of the printing work done under Kent's leadership at The Met.

Kent felt that librarians were public servants and was committed to the education of the public through the museum and established the first visitor center; initiated free tours; and guided the public's knowledge of the collections through lectures, talks, and publications that weren't "too scholarly." As the Supervisor of Museum Instruction from 1907 to 1925, he produced annual reports detailing the educational services provided by the museum. He greatly emphasized youth programming and in 1905 the museum began admitting New York City classes for free.

He was greatly interested in American decorative arts and worked with De Forest and his wife to found the American Wing of the Metropolitan Museum of Art.

Kent retired from the Met in 1940 after Francis Henry Taylor became director. Taylor appointed Lawrence S. Harrison to lead the administration and refused to let Kent see the museum reports without Harrison approving, finding Kent's methods to be old-fashioned.

=== Later career ===
Kent was a founding member of the American Association of Museums in 1906 and the American Federation of Arts. In 1923, he directed the restoration of the Glebe House in Woodbury, CT. In 1924, he was invited to join the Arts Advisory Committee for the Carnegie Foundation.

Henry Watson Kent served as president of the American Institute of Graphic Arts from 1936–1938. In 1930 he received the AIGA Medal, the most distinguished in the field of design and visual communication.

== Death ==
Kent died of a heart attack August 28, 1948.

== Works ==
- (ed. with John Cotton Dana) Literature of libraries in the seventeenth and eighteenth centuries, 6 vols., Chicago: A. C. McClure, 1906-7.

- No. 1: The duties & qualifications of a librarian: a discourse ... in the Sorbonne, 1780; by Jean-Baptiste Cotton des Houssayes.
- No. 2: The reformed librarie-keeper ... concerning the place and office of a librarie-keeper; by John Dury (1596-1680).
- No. 3: The life of Sir Thomas Bodley written by himself together with the first draft of the statutes of the public library at Oxon.
- No. 4: Two tracts on the founding and maintaining of parochial libraries in Scotland; by James Kirkwood (d. 1708).
- No. 5: A brief outline of the history of libraries; by Justus Lipsius; transl. from 2nd ed, 1607
- No. 6: News from France or a description of the library of Cardinal Mazarin preceded by The surrender of the library ... two tracts written by Gabriel Naude (1600-1653).

- What I am Pleased To Call My Education, New York: The Grolier Club, 1949.
