= Jabez Bacon House =

Historic house in Connecticut, United States

- U.S. National Register of Historic Places
- U.S. Historic district – Contributing property
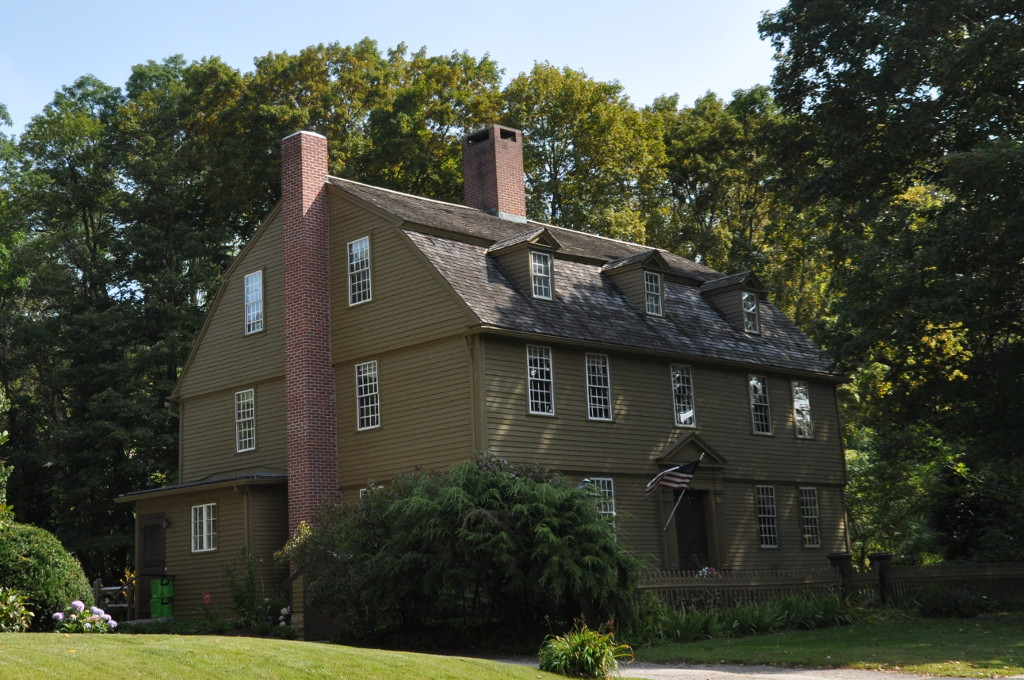

- Location within Connecticut Location within the United States
- Location: Hollow Road near its Junction with Route 6, Woodbury, Connecticut
- Coordinates: 41°32′17″N 73°12′32″W
- Area: 3 acres (1.2 ha)
- Built: 1760
- Built by: Moore, Roswell
- Architectural style: Georgian
- Part of: Woodbury Historic District No. 1 (ID71000908)
- NRHP reference No.: 71000904

Significant dates
- Added to NRHP: April 16, 1971
- Designated CP: March 11, 1971

The Jabez Bacon House is a historic house on Hollow Road in Woodbury, Connecticut. Built in 1760 for a prominent regional merchant, it is a well-preserved example of Georgian architecture. It was listed on the National Register of Historic Places in 1971.

== Description and history ==
The Jabez Bacon House stands near the southern end of Woodbury's main village, on the north side of Hollow Road between Sycamore and Main Streets. It is a 2 3/4-story wood-frame structure, with a dormered gambrel roof, central chimney, and clapboarded exterior. It is five bays wide, with a slightly overhanging second story. The front entry is centered, with a reproduction surround consisting of flanking pilasters and a pedimented gable above. The three roof dormers also exhibit full pediments. The interior of the house follows a typical Georgian central chimney plan, but has a wider than usual entry vestibule with staircase. The interior retains original paneled wall finishes, and many rooms have original flooring. The living room includes a period cabinet, and the chimney includes two surviving period ovens.

The house was built in 1760 by Roswell Moore, a prominent local carpenter. He built it for Jabez Bacon, a merchant and banker who operated a store next door, and sent traders as far west as present-day Ohio. It was later acquired by Daniel Curtiss, who also operated a merchant business. Curtiss notably trained as a salesman Collis Potter Huntington, who later became prominent for his role in construction of the transcontinental railway.

== See also ==
- Glebe House (Woodbury, Connecticut), a house museum nearby on Hollow Road
- National Register of Historic Places listings in Litchfield County, Connecticut
