= John-Manuel Andriote =

American journalist and author

- Born: October 6, 1958 (age 67); New London, Connecticut, U.S.
- Education: Norwich Free Academy; Gordon College; Medill School of Journalism
- Occupations: Journalist; author
- Writing career
- Notable awards: Lambda Literary Award (2000)

John-Manuel Andriote (born October 6, 1958) is an American journalist and author. He has written about health, medicine, politics and culture for The Washington Post, and other newspapers and magazines. He began reporting on HIV and AIDS in 1986.

== Early life and education ==
John-Manuel Andriote was born in New London, Connecticut, on October 6, 1958. He graduated from the Norwich Free Academy in 1976. He earned a bachelor's degree in English from Gordon College in 1980. In 1986 he earned a master's degree from Northwestern University's Medill School of Journalism.

== Career ==
=== Focus on HIV/AIDS ===
Andriote began to focus on HIV/AIDS in 1986. His first article on the subject was titled "Coping with Grief in the Time of AIDS," published in Chicago's Windy City Times.
Andriote's history of the HIV/AIDS epidemic in America, Victory Deferred: How AIDS Changed Gay Life in America, was published by the University of Chicago Press in 1999. The book won the 2000 Lambda Literary Awards "Editors' Choice" award, was an American Library Association Stonewall Nonfiction Awards finalist, and was a finalist for the 2000 Publishing Triangle's Randy Shilts Award for Gay Nonfiction. In 2008, the Smithsonian Institution's National Museum of American History Archive Center created "The John-Manuel Andriote Victory Deferred Collection" of his research materials, correspondence and recorded interviews used to develop the book. In 2011, Andriote independently published an updated and expanded second edition of Victory Deferred to coincide with the thirtieth anniversary of the first reported AIDS cases.

=== Disco and dance music ===
In 2001, HarperEntertainment published Andriote's book Hot Stuff: A Brief History of Disco. Andriote discussed the book on NPR's Kojo Nnamdi Show and in a two-part series on the disco era produced by David Swatling for Radio Netherlands. Andriote has been featured in two BBC television documentaries on the disco era, "When Disco Ruled the World" and a biopic of Chic founder and music producer Nile Rogers called "The Hitmaker." In 2009 the Smithsonian Institution's's National Museum of American History Archive Center created "The John-Manuel Andriote Hot Stuff: A Brief History of Disco Collection" of the interviews and other research materials used to develop the book. In 2012, Andriote updated, retitled, and independently released an e-book edition of the book, Hot Stuff: A Brief History of Disco/Dance Music.

=== Living with HIV ===
Andriote "came out" in 2006 about his October 27, 2005 HIV diagnosis in a firsthand Washington Post story, and NPR interview. He has subsequently written and spoken about his experience of living with HIV, including a 2012 radio profile called "A Life Marked By AIDS" for Deutsche Welle (German Worldwide Radio).

=== Children's author ===
In 2014, Andriote independently published his first illustrated children's picture book, Wilhelmina Goes Wandering, based on the true story of a runaway cow in Milford, CT. He discussed the book with Connecticut television hosts, including Scot Haney on WFSB's "Better Connecticut" and Teresa Dufour on WTNH's "Connecticut Style." The book was profiled in Connecticut Family magazine and served as the basis of a 2015 "Wilhelmina Goes Writing" contest for eastern Connecticut area elementary schools, sponsored by The Day, the daily newspaper of New London, Connecticut.

=== Return to Connecticut ===
In 2015, Andriote independently published Tough Love: A Washington Reporter Finds Resilience, Ruin, and Zombies in His 'Other Connecticut' Hometown. The book is a collection of his writing between 2007 and 2014 focused on eastern Connecticut, including more than 150 of Andriote's weekly columns for The Bulletin, the daily newspaper in Norwich, CT, blogs written for HuffPost, and feature articles about eastern Connecticut. Andriote discussed Tough Love with WTNH "Connecticut Style" host Teresa Dufour, and on NPR's Colin McEnroe Show.

=== Focus on resilience ===
In 2017 Rowman & Littlefield published Andriote's book Stonewall Strong: Gay Men's Heroic Fight for Resilience, Good Health, and a Strong Community. The book is based on Andriote's personal story of living with HIV, nearly 100 original interviews, and new behavioral research focused on gay men. In September 2017, Andriote began a blog titled "Stonewall Strong" for Psychology Today, focused on lessons from gay men's experience of trauma and resilience.

== Additional works ==
Andriote also has contributed chapters and essays to The AIDS Pandemic: Impact on Science and Society (Kenneth H. Mayer, MD, H.F. Pizer, editors, Elsevier/Academic Press, 2005); Creating Change: Sexuality, Public Policy and Civil Rights (John D'Emilio, William Thompson, Urvashi Vaid, editors, St. Martin's Press, 2000); Out in the Workplace (Richard Rasi and Lourdes Rodriguez-Noches, editors, Alyson, 1995); and You Can Do Something About AIDS (Alyson, 1988).

== Works and publications ==
- Victory Deferred. University of Chicago Press. 1999. ISBN 978-0226020495.
- Hot Stuff. Harper Paperbacks. 2001. ISBN 978-0380809073.
- Wilhelmina Goes Wandering. Independent. 2014. ISBN 978-1628902587.
- Tough Love. Independent. 2015. ISBN 978-1634434539.
- Stonewall Strong. Rowman & Littlefield. 2017. ISBN 978-1442258235.
