= Woodbury Historic District No. 2 =

Historic district in Connecticut, United States

- U.S. National Register of Historic Places
- U.S. Historic district
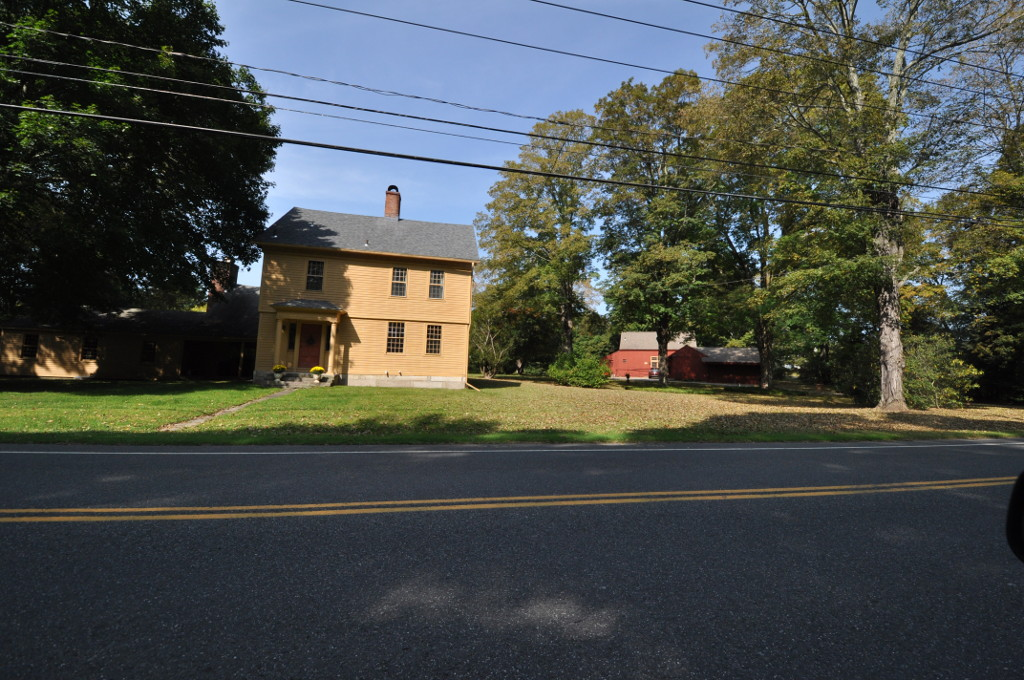

- Location within Connecticut Location within the United States
- Location: Both Sides of Main Street from Woodbury-Southbury Town line to Middle Quarter, Woodbury, Connecticut
- Coordinates: 41°30′56″N 73°12′17″W
- Area: 50 acres (20 ha)
- Built by: Multiple
- NRHP reference No.: 72001326
- Added to NRHP: February 23, 1972

The Woodbury Historic District No. 2 encompasses a linear rural-residential area of Southern Woodbury, Connecticut. It extends along the Town's Main Street (Route 6), from the town line with Southbury in the south to the South Pomperaug Avenue Junction in the North. It contains some of the Town's finest examples of 18th and early 19th-century residential architecture. It was listed on the National Register of Historic Places in 1972.

== Description and history ==
The Town of Woodbury was settled by colonists in 1673, having purchased its land from the Potatuck people. The early settlement was made along a long-standing Native American trail, now roughly followed by Main Street. It was incorporated in 1674, and was the mother town for several surrounding communities, achieving its present municipal bounds by 1807. It was a prosperous agricultural community in the 18th and early 19th century.

The historic district is organized as a basically linear area of about 50 acres (20 ha), stretching from the town line in the south for about 1 mile (1.6 km), almost to the junction with South Pomperaug Avenue. This area is largely rural-residential in character, which continues into the Southbury Historic District No. 1 to the south, and (after passing through a more modern commercial area) into the Woodbury Historic District No. 1. There are 27 houses of historic significance in the district, ranging in construction date from the late 18th to the 20th century. There is only one house that predates 1740; there are six houses from the Federal and Greek Revival periods, including a particularly fine Greek Revival house on the east side of Main Street, featuring a flushboarded gable pediment, corner pilasters, and a Greek Revival entrance surround. Most of the houses in the district post-date the American Civil War.

== See also ==
- Woodbury Historic District No. 1, covering the town center to the north
- National Register of Historic Places listings in Litchfield County, Connecticut
