= Couldn't Keep It to Myself =

- Editor: Wally Lamb
- Authors: Nancy Whiteley; Carolyn Ann Adams; Tabatha Rowley; Nancy Birkla; Brenda Medina; Robin Cullen; Bonnie Foreshaw; Barbara Parsons Lane; Michelle Jessamy; Diane Bartholomew; Dale Griffith
- Subjects: Autobiography; anthology
- Publisher: ReganBooks
- Publication date: 2003
- Pages: 350
- ISBN: 0-06-053429-X
- OCLC: 50920613

Couldn't Keep It to Myself: Testimonies from Our Imprisoned Sisters is a collection of autobiographies by the inmates of the York Correctional Institution.

== Summary ==
For several years, Wally Lamb taught writing skills to inmates at the York Correctional Institution, a women's prison in Niantic, Connecticut. The book contains personal stories written by the inmates dealing with their lives. Most were sexually, physically, or mentally abused, and came from impoverished backgrounds.

== Reception ==
- Allyssa Lee, of Entertainment Weekly, said that the book has 12 riveting, touching autobiographical accounts that look past the bars to lay bare lives that would normally have gone unheard and that the book deserves an audience.
- It was reviewed by Women in Action.
- Pop Matters said that the book's vivid and intimate portrayals remind us that these women are human beings first, inmates second.
- It was reviewed by Inner Lives: Voices of African-American Women in Prison.
- An inmate, Barbara Parsons Lane, won a Pen Literary Award for her contribution to the book.
