= Glebe House (Woodbury, Connecticut) =

Historic house in Connecticut, United States

- U.S. National Register of Historic Places
- U.S. Historic district – Contributing property
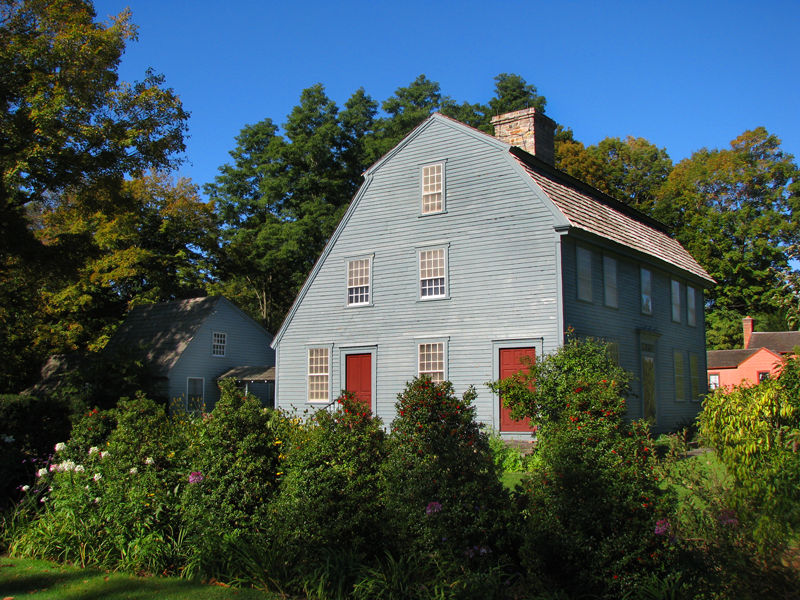

- Location within Connecticut Location within the United States
- Location: 49 Hollow Road, Woodbury, Connecticut
- Coordinates: 41°32′18″N 73°12′38″W
- Area: 2 acres (0.81 ha)
- Built: 1746
- Architectural style: Georgian
- Part of: Woodbury Historic District No. 1 (ID71000908)
- NRHP reference No.: 71000902

Significant dates
- Added to NRHP: March 11, 1971
- Designated CP: March 11, 1971

The Glebe House is a historic house museum at 49 Hollow Road in Woodbury, Connecticut. Built about 1740, it is a prominent local example of Georgian colonial architecture. It is also important as the site of the first Episcopal Church election in the United States.

It was added to the National Register of Historic Places in 1971. It is open for regular tours between May and October, and by appointment.

== Description ==
The Glebe House stands near the southern end of Woodbury's main village, on the south side of Hollow Road near its junction with Connecticut Route 317. It is a 2 1/2-story wood-frame structure, with a modified saltbox profile. Its front roof has two faces in the gambrel form, and the rear face, also gambreled, is slightly curved, extending down to the top of the first floor. It has a five-bay front facade, with a center entrance topped by a transom window and corniced entablature. The building interior retains many original features, including one of the largest known kitchen fireplaces in the state.

== History ==
The Glebe House was built around 1740 for the Rev. John Rutgers Marshall and his wife Sarah as the rectory for St. Paul's Church in Woodbury. The Marshalls lived there from 1771 until 1785. On March 29, 1783, it was the site of the first episcopal election in the United States. Ten clergy met at the house and selected Samuel Seabury and Jeremiah Leaming as candidates for Bishop of Connecticut. Leaming was the first choice of the clergy and Seabury as backup if Leaming declined, which he did, due to age and health.

After the Marshalls left the house, it fell into disrepair by the 1920s. In 1923, the house was purchased by Edward C. Acheson, Bishop Coadjutor of Connecticut, who formed the Seabury Society for the Preservation of Glebe House. Under the direction of Henry Watson Kent, the Secretary of the Metropolitan Museum of Art, the house was restored. In 1926, Gertrude Jekyll was commissioned to design an "old fashioned" garden to enhance the newly created museum. Her design included a hedge with a flower border and path leading to the door; a small, formal garden and six vegetable plots in the rear of the house; and narrow borders flanking the door.

== See also ==
- Jabez Bacon House, located nearby on Hollow Road
- National Register of Historic Places listings in Litchfield County, Connecticut
