= 1897 Rhode Island football team =

American college football season

1897 Rhode Island football
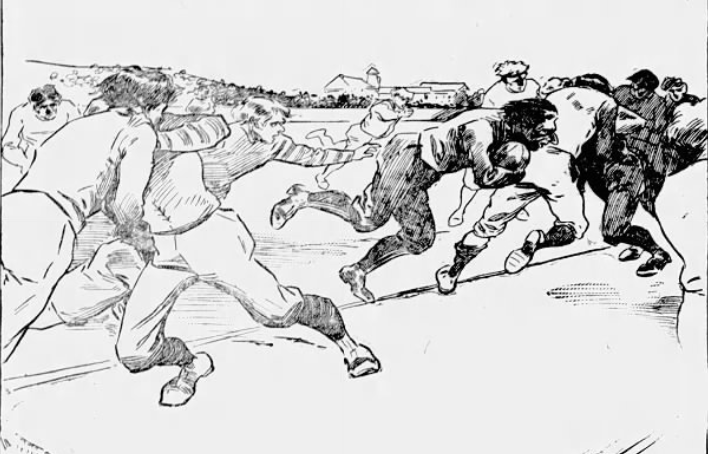
- Conference: Athletic League of New England State Colleges
- Record: 1–2 (0–1 New England)
- Head coach: None
- Captain: Robert S. Doughty

The 1897 Rhode Island football team represented Rhode Island College of Agriculture and the Mechanic Arts, now known as the University of Rhode Island, as a member of the Athletic League of New England State Colleges (commonly referred to as New England League) during the 1897 college football season. The team had no coach. The team compiled an overall record of 1–2, a 0–1 record in conference play, and outscored opponents by a total of 30 to 28. It was the team's third season of intercollegiate football.

In the team's second game, a matchup against Storrs marked the first iteration of the Rhode Island–UConn football rivalry.

== Schedule ==
Date	Opponent	Site	Result	Source
October 16	at New London YMCA*	Black Hall; New London, CT	L 0–6	
October 23	vs. Storrs	New London, CT (rivalry)	L 8–22	
November 13	Pawtucket High School*	Kingston, RI	W 22–0	
*Non-conference game

== Roster ==
Rhode Island 1897 roster
Guards: William F. Harley; Robert E. Grinnell; Tackles: Harry Page Wilson; James R. Emmett	Center: George C. Soule; Ends: Arthur A. Denico; William Clark	Backs: Robert S. Doughty (C); William F. Owen; William C. P. Merrill; M. R. Cross

Reserves were J. J. Fry, H. W. Case, D. N. Newton Jr., and W. S. Bacheller.
