= Wally Lamb =

American novelist (born 1950)

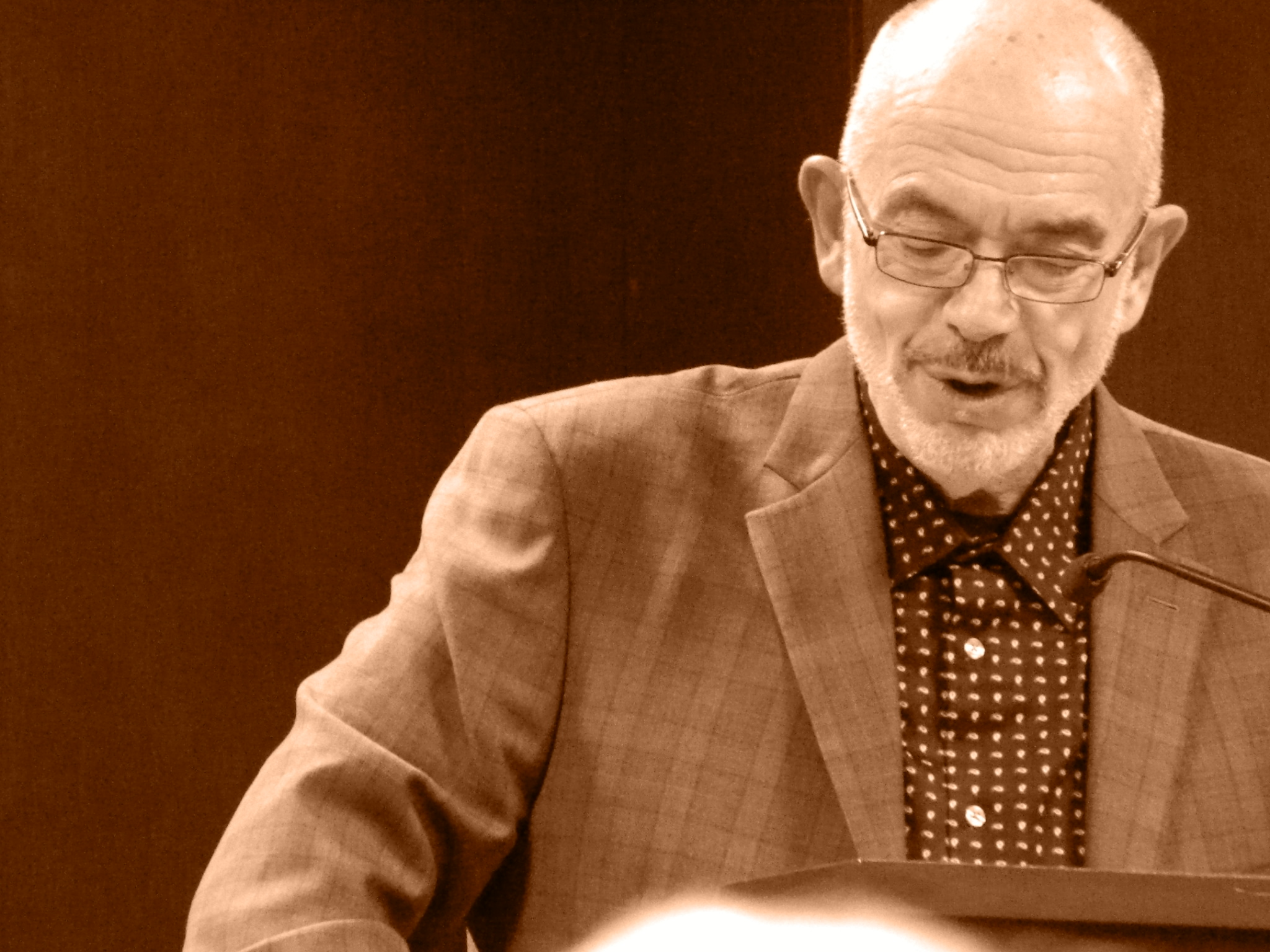
- Lamb at discussion and book signing in New York City 2013
- Born: Walter John Lamb; October 17, 1950 (age 76); Norwich, Connecticut, U.S.
- Education: University of Connecticut (BA, MA); Vermont College of Fine Arts (MFA)
- Occupation: Novelist
- Website: Official website

Wally Lamb (born October 17, 1950) is an American author known as the writer of the novels She's Come Undone, I Know This Much Is True, and The River Is Waiting, all of which were selected for Oprah's Book Club or Oprah's Book Club 2.0. He was the director of the Writing Center at Norwich Free Academy in Norwich from 1989 to 1998 and has taught creative writing in the English Department at the University of Connecticut.

== Early life ==
Lamb was born to a working class Catholic family of German, English and Italian descent in Norwich, Connecticut. His father Walter was superintendent of the Gas Department of Norwich, Department of Public Utilities, while his mother Anna was a homemaker. Three Rivers, the fictional town where several of his novels are set, is based on Norwich and the nearby towns of New London and Willimantic in Connecticut as well as Westerly, Rhode Island. As a child, Lamb loved to draw and create his own comic books—activities which, he says, gave him "a leg up" on the imagery and colloquial dialogue that characterize his stories. He credits his ability to write in female voices, as well as male, with having grown up with older sisters in a neighborhood largely populated by girls.

After graduating from high school, Lamb studied at the University of Connecticut during the turbulent early 1970s era of anti-war and civil rights protests and student strikes. He holds a B.A. and an M.A. in education from the University of Connecticut and a Master of Fine Arts in Writing from Vermont College.

== Writing ==
Lamb began writing in 1981, the year he became a father. Lamb's first published stories were short fictions that appeared in Northeast, a Sunday magazine of the Hartford Courant. "Astronauts," published in The Missouri Review in 1989, won the Missouri Review William Peden Prize and became widely anthologized. His first novel, She's Come Undone, was followed six years later by I Know This Much Is True, a story about identical twin brothers, one of whom develops paranoid schizophrenia. Both novels became number one bestsellers after Oprah Winfrey selected them for her popular Book Club.

Lamb's third novel, The Hour I First Believed, published in 2008, interfaces fiction with such non-fictional events as the Columbine High School shooting, the Iraq War, and, in a story within the story, events of nineteenth-century America. Published the following year, Wishin' and Hopin' was a departure for Lamb: a short, comically nostalgic novel about a parochial school fifth grader, set in 1964. In We Are Water, Lamb returns to his familiar setting of Three Rivers. The novel focuses on art, 1950s-era racial strife, and the impact of a devastating flood on a Connecticut family. His seventh novel, I'll Take You There, revives characters from Wishin' and Hopin' and considers themes of millennial-era popular culture contrasted with figures from the silent film era and the 1950s Miss Rheingold contest.

== Teaching ==
For 25 years, Lamb taught English and writing at the Norwich Free Academy, a regional high school that was his alma mater. In his last years at the school, Lamb designed and implemented the school's Writing Center, where he instructed students in writing across the disciplines. As a result of his work for this program, he was chosen the Norwich Free Academy's first Teacher of the Year and later was named a finalist for the honor of Connecticut Teacher of the Year (1989). From 1997 to 1999, Lamb was an associate professor in the English Department at the University of Connecticut. As the school's Director of Creative Writing, he originated a student-staffed literary and arts magazine, The Long River Review.

== Prison work ==
From 1999 to 2019, Lamb facilitated a writing program for incarcerated women at the York Correctional Institute, Connecticut's only women's prison, in Niantic. Lamb's writing program at York Prison produced two collections of his inmate students' autobiographical writing, Couldn't Keep It to Myself: Testimonies from Our Imprisoned Sisters and I'll Fly Away: Further Testimonies from the Women of York Prison, both of which Lamb edited. A third collection, titled You Don't Know Me: Incarcerated Women Voice Their Truths, was slated for publication in October 2019 but never released.

The publication of the first book became a source of controversy and media attention when, a week before its release, the State of Connecticut unexpectedly sued its incarcerated contributors—not for the six thousand dollars each writer would collect after her release from prison but for the entire cost of her incarceration, calculated at $117 per day times the number of days in her prison sentence. When one of the writers won a PEN/Newman's Own First Amendment Award, given to a writer whose freedom of speech is under attack, the prison destroyed the women's writing and moved to close down Lamb's program. These actions caught the interest of the television show 60 Minutes, and shortly before the show aired an episode about the controversy, the State of Connecticut settled the lawsuit and reinstated the program.

== Influences ==
Lamb says he is influenced by masters of long- and short-form fiction, among them John Updike, Flannery O'Connor, F. Scott Fitzgerald, Willa Cather, Edith Wharton, Raymond Carver, and Andre Dubus. He credits his perennial teaching of certain novels to high school students with teaching him about "the scaffolding" of longer stories. Among these, Lamb lists Harper Lee's To Kill a Mockingbird, Mark Twain's The Adventures of Huckleberry Finn, and J.D. Salinger's The Catcher in the Rye. He says Joseph Campbell's The Hero with a Thousand Faces and other anthropological analyses of the commonalities of ancient myths from diverse world cultures helped him to figure out the ways in which stories, ancient and modern, can illuminate the human condition. Lamb has also stated that he is influenced by pop culture and artists who work in other media. Among these he mentions painters Edward Hopper and René Magritte.

== Honors and awards ==
Lamb's writing awards include grants from the National Endowment for the Arts and the Connecticut Commission on the Arts, the Connecticut Center for the Book's Lifetime Achievement Award, selections by Oprah's Book Club and Germany's Bertelsmann Book Club, the Pushcart Prize, the New England Book Award for Fiction, and New York Times Notable Books of the Year listings. She's Come Undone was a finalist for the Los Angeles Times's Best First Novel Award and one of People magazine's Top Ten Books of the Year. I Know This Much Is True won the Friends of Libraries Readers' Choice Award for best novel of 1998 and the National Alliance for the Mentally Ill's Kenneth Johnson Award for its anti-stigmatizing of mental illness.

Teaching awards for Lamb include a national Apple Computers "Thanks to Teachers" Excellence Award and the Barnes & Noble "Writers Helping Writers" Award for his work with incarcerated women. Lamb has received Honorary Doctoral Degrees from several colleges and universities and was awarded Distinguished Alumni awards from Vermont College of Fine Arts and the University of Connecticut.

== Personal life ==
Lamb is married and has three sons, one of whom Jared, is a principal in Louisiana and Internet personality. He lives in Norwich, Connecticut.

== Bibliography ==
=== Fiction ===
- She's Come Undone (1992)
- I Know This Much Is True (1998)
- The Hour I First Believed (2008)
- Wishin' and Hopin': A Christmas Story (2009) - Made into the 2014 Lifetime film Wishin' and Hopin'
- We Are Water (2013)
- I'll Take You There (2016)
- The River is Waiting (2025)

=== Non-fiction ===
- Couldn't Keep It To Myself: Testimonies from Our Imprisoned Sisters (2003)
- I'll Fly Away: Further Testimonies from the Women of York Prison (2007)

== Sources ==
- Barreca, Regina. Don't Tell Mama: The Penguin Book of Italian American Writing. New York: Penguin Books, 2002.
- Goldberg, Carole. "Lamb for Christmas: Writer Takes Different Tack in Fourth Novel, Lacing It With Much More Humor, Less Pathos." The Hartford Courant November 15, 2009: G6, G8. Print.
- Lamb, Wally. "P.S. Insights, Interviews, and More." The Hour I First Believed, Perennial Edition. New York: HarperCollins, 2009.
- Lamb, Wally. "P.S. Insights, Interviews, and More." I Know This Much Is True, Perennial Edition. New York: HarperCollins, 2008.
- Lamb, Wally. "Revisions and Corrections." I'll Fly Away: Further Testimonies from the Women of York Prison. Ed. Wally Lamb. New York: HarperCollins, 2007.
- Lamb, Wally. "Notes to the Reader" and "Couldn't Keep It To Ourselves." Couldn't Keep It To Myself: Testimonies From Our Imprisoned Sisters. Ed. Wally Lamb. New York: HarperCollins, 2003.
- McClurg, Jocelyn. "'Oprah Effect' Strikes Wally Lamb Again." Hartford Courant June 19, 1998: A1, A14.
- Miceli, Barbara. "Two Fathers: Comparing Italian and American Fatherhood in Wally Lamb's I Know This Much Is True." British and American Studies Journal, Vol 31, 2025: pp. 73–82.
- Shoup, Barbara and Margaret Love Denman. Novel Ideas: Contemporary Authors Share the Creative Process. Indianapolis: Alpha Books, 2001.
