= Jean-Baptiste Cotton des Houssayes =

French librarian and author

Jean-Baptiste Cotton des Houssayes (1727–1783) was a French librarian, author and priest. He first served as a priest in Rouen, in Normandy. Passionate about books and knowledge, he was appointed librarian at the Sorbonne University in 1776. In 1780, he wrote a significant treatise titled The Duties and Qualifications of a Librarian outlining the duties and qualifications of a librarian. According to his treatise, librarians should possess extensive knowledge, be skilled in bibliography, exercise sound judgment in book acquisition and offer great customer service. His works and library collection were donated to the Sorbonne after his death.

== Biography ==
=== Early life ===
He was born in the small town of La Neuville Chant d’Oisel, in Normandy, near Rouen. He chose a clerical career, became an abbé and lived most of his life in Rouen, where he accepted membership in the local academy in 1764, and taught in the city's college from 1764 to 1774. He loved books and reading and educated himself widely and methodically in many branches of learning. In 1755 he began making notes about what he read and studied. In 1776, he was appointed librarian of the Sorbonne. He promised to emulate the great librarians of the past, such as cardinals Angelo Maria Querini (1680-1755) and Domenico Silvio Passionei (1682–1761), who served as librarians of the Vatican, Gabriel Naudé, creator of the Mazarine library, Johann Michel Francke (1717–1775), who created the catalog of the magnificent library of Count Bünau, minister of the king of Saxony; and Ludovico Antonio Muratori (1672–1750), priest, historian, antiquarian and archivist and librarian of the Ducal Palace of Modena, one of the foremost scholars of his age.

=== Writings on librarianship ===
On December 23, 1780, Cotton des Houssayes presented a discourse in Latin to the assembled faculty, entitled Oratio habita in Comitiis Generalibus Societatis Sorbonicae. In this paper he outlined what he considered to be the duties and qualifications of a librarian. This paper has been reprinted several times and is included in several books. Translated into French in 1839 by Pierre Duplessis, the treatise became known as Discours sur les Qualités et les Devoirs du Bibliothécaire. This version has also been repeatedly reissued. The first English translation appeared in 1863; Dana and Kent included it as a classic in their collection of works on librarianship of the seventeenth and eighteenth centuries, published in 1906 by McClure in Chicago. It has been published by other firms under various titles. It is a popular and important document for it expresses the philosophy of librarianship. Cotton des Houssayes deserves the admiration from any librarian for his efforts on behalf of the profession.

Cotton des Houssayes suggests in The Duties and Qualifications of a Librarian that the librarian possess all secular and sacred learning; he must be a professional theologian, and have an array of knowledge of literature, of the arts and the sciences. He must be versed in bibliography, since it is the foundation of all other sciences. The librarian must have sound judgment in book acquisition and have the ability to create a comprehensive collection, but he must practice selection to achieve genuine merit for his library. The librarian must exercise economy; must be imbued with the need for a good classification system; and have a great memory, for he must know every book and its location. A good librarian must welcome all scholars and be their friendly and intelligent guide. When introducing a patron to the library, or if a scholar should ask to see a book, it should be placed before him. The librarian should always be ready with suggestions for other books on the same subject. Finally, the librarian must be polite and offer great service.

Cotton des Houssayes’ ideas from the seventeenth century are just as important in the twenty-first century as when they were first present: a librarian should strive to offer outstanding customer service.

=== Other writings ===
He wrote several other works, among them Éloge Historique de M. Maillet du Boullay, published in octavo in 170 in Rouen; in 1775 appeared his Éloge Historique de l’Abbé de Saas, also in octavo; and in Paris, in 1783, appeared his Éloge Historique de Chamousse, which was published in two volumes in octavo. He also published several articles on botanical subjects in the Journal de Physique in 1780 and delivered several discourses before the Académie de l’Immaculée Conception de la Sainte Vierge de Rouen. He edited the works of Claude-Humbert Piarron de Chamousset, a philanthropist. He spent many years working on a monumental unfinished bibliographic manuscript to be entitled Histoire Littéraire Universelle, ou Bibliothèque Raisonnée, also Traité des Universités de France and Mélanges Bibliographiques.

== Legacy ==
After his death his personal library and literary collection were donated to the Sorbonne.
