= Woodbury Historic District No. 1 =

Historic district in Connecticut, United States

- U.S. National Register of Historic Places
- U.S. Historic district
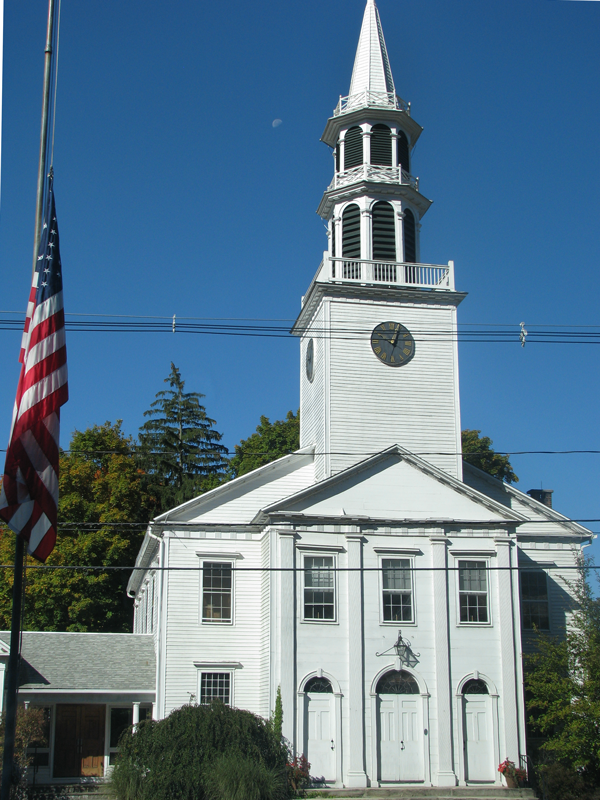
- United Methodist Church in Woodbury

- Location within Connecticut Location within the United States
- Location: Both Sides of Main Street (Route 6) for 2 mile, Radiating Roads, Woodbury, Connecticut
- Coordinates: 41°32′39″N 73°12′31″W
- Area: 200 acres (81 ha)
- Built: 1680
- Built by: Multiple
- Architectural style: Mid 19th Century Revival, Early Republic, Colonial
- NRHP reference No.: 71000908
- Added to NRHP: March 11, 1971

The Woodbury Historic District No. 1 encompasses the linear town center of Woodbury, Connecticut. Extending along Two Miles of Main Street (Route 6), from Flanders Road in the North to Old Sherman Hill Road in the South, the district represents an architectural cross section of the town history, from the late 17th century to the present. It was added to the National Register of Historic Places on March 11, 1971.

== Description and history ==
The town of Woodbury was settled by colonists in 1673, having purchased its land from the Potatuck people. The early settlement was made along a long-standing Native American trail, now roughly followed by Main Street. It was incorporated in 1674, and was the mother town for several surrounding communities, achieving its present municipal bounds by 1807. It was a prosperous agricultural community in the 18th and early 19th century, the period to which much of the town center's architecture dates.

The historic town center stretches for about Two Miles along Main Street, with branching elements along some of the Side Streets. Its Northernmost extent is Flanders Road, and its Southern End is at Old Sherman Hill Road. In an area of more than 200 acres (81 ha), there are 161 historically significant buildings. About half were built before 1830, including thirteen that were built before 1740. The oldest buildings, houses and barns, date to the 1680s. The Glebe House, built in 1740, is also historically important as the site of an early foundational meeting of the Episcopal Church. There are nine churches in the district, including three Federal style buildings erected before 1820. The visually most prominent is the Roman Catholic church, which was built in 1902.

== See also ==
- Woodbury Historic District No. 2, located along Main Street south of the commercial area
- National Register of Historic Places listings in Litchfield County, Connecticut
