= She's Come Undone =

1992 novel by Wally Lamb

- Cover to the first edition
- Author: Wally Lamb
- Language: English
- Genre: Comedy, drama
- Publisher: Simon & Schuster
- Publication date: 24 August 1992
- Publication place: United States
- Media type: Print (hardback & paperback)
- Pages: 368 pp (hardback edition) & 465 pp (paperback edition)
- ISBN: 0-671-71568-2
- OCLC: 29468346

She's Come Undone is the 1992 debut novel by Wally Lamb. The novel was selected as the fourth book for Oprah's Book Club in December 1996. Lamb's novel was named a finalist for the 1992 Los Angeles Book Awards' Art Seidenbaum Prize for first fiction. She's Come Undone has been translated into eighteen languages.

== Plot summary ==
Dolores Price is heartbroken when her father leaves her mother, Bernice, and their middle-class, suburban home for another woman. Dolores and her mother must subsequently move into her overbearing grandmother's house in Easterly, Rhode Island. Dolores' widowed grandmother is a rather old-fashioned, judgmental, and strict Roman Catholic woman who yearns for the days of old. Her grandmother has great difficulty processing the ongoing disintegration of her immediate family and the transformation of her once predominantly white, middle-class neighborhood into a multi-racial, poverty-stricken, and crime-ridden one.

Dolores starts attending St. Anthony's, a Catholic junior high school, and struggles with bullying and loneliness, unable to fit in to the established social hierarchy. After being raped by a neighbor named Jack, who preys on her vulnerable state, Dolores turns to food and television for comfort, leading to extreme weight gain.

Following an accident that causes the death of her mother, Dolores decides to attend the academically underwhelming Merton College in Pennsylvania. There Dolores is ridiculed for her weight and cultivates a secret obsession with her roommate's long-distance boyfriend, Dante, who sends love letters and nude Polaroid photos in the mail. After a humiliating episode of bullying at a school event, she is coerced into a one-night stand with Dottie, the college's lesbian custodian. Dolores then embarks on a long cab ride to Cape Cod, where she witnesses a beached whale dying. She feels kinship with the animal and wades into the water to drown herself.

After her suicide attempt, Dolores is institutionalized for seven years at Gracewood Institute, a private mental hospital in Newport, Rhode Island. Here she begins to work through her issues with the help of her psychotherapist. She makes an emotional breakthrough and loses over 100 pounds, but feels increasingly restricted by the constraints on her freedom as a patient. Upon release from care, she decides to move to Montpelier, Vermont, where she has located Dante, the former object of her infatuation.

Dolores gets a job at a local grocery store and moves into an apartment across the hallway from Dante, who now works as a high school English teacher. The two begin a romantic relationship, and eventually marry. However, Dante begins to manipulate Dolores. Despite Dolores' deep desire to have a child, Dante pressures her into an abortion when she becomes pregnant. After the loss of her baby, Dolores becomes resentful of the control Dante exerts over her life. Later, he is fired from his job due to claims of an inappropriate sexual relationship with a student. He initially conceals the news of his unemployment from Dolores and convinces her that the allegation is untrue. Dolores takes up multiple jobs as Dante spends money recklessly and leads a sedentary lifestyle at home. One day, Dolores discovers Dante in bed with a high school student.

After the sudden death of her grandmother, Dolores reaches an emotional breaking point. She accuses Dante of raping his student and comes clean about her past. Dolores admits that she orchestrated their entire relationship after stealing the love letters he had sent in college and falling in love with someone she perceived as a "sensitive, vulnerable boy". He is outraged and leaves. They divorce and Dolores moves into her late grandmother's house, which she has inherited.

At her grandmother's funeral, Dolores reconnects with several characters from her past, who together form a surrogate family for her in Easterly. They encourage her to pursue her full potential, and she enrolls in college courses while working. Here she meets Thayer, a single father, who is immediately smitten with her despite her troubled past. Initially Dolores rebuffs his advances, but is charmed when he and his teenage son surprise her with a rap performance about how much he likes her. They begin a tentative romance, predicated on Dolores' desire to have a child. Dolores realizes that for the first time, she has a partner whom she can trust and who will treat her as an equal. Thayer supports her as she receives IVF treatment, but they do not have enough money for a second attempt after the first one fails.

By now, Dolores is in her late thirties and is depressed by the idea that she will never be a mother. Thayer, now her husband, takes her on a whale watching trip to lift her spirits. While on the boat, Dolores muses about her past and future. Dolores decides that her life, as it is now, is wonderful and is enough. The novel ends with her being the only one to see a whale breach the ocean, symbolizing her newfound peace.

== Characters ==
- Dolores Price: narrator and protagonist.
- Bernice Price (née Holland) ("Ma"): Dolores' mother, a tollbooth worker.
- Anthony "Tony" Price ("Daddy"): Dolores' father, a property manager.
- Thelma Holland ("Grandma"): Dolores' grandmother, a devout Roman Catholic widow living in Easterly, Rhode Island.
- Roberta Jaskiewicz: Owner of the Peacock Tattoo Emporium across the street from Grandma's house, friend and later housemate of Dolores.
- Jack Speight: A tenant of Grandma's who lives in the third-floor apartment with his wife, Rita.
- Fabio Pucci ("Mr. Pucci"): Dolores' guidance counselor at Easterly High, later her best friend.
- Katherine ("Kippy") Strednicki: Dolores' roommate at Merton College.
- Dante Davis: Kippy's long-distance boyfriend, Dolores' college infatuation, and eventual first husband.
- Dottie: A custodian at Merton College, Dolores' friend and later one-time sexual partner.
- Dr. Shaw: Dolores' psychotherapist at Gracewood Institute.
- Thayer Kitchen: A student at Ocean Point Community College, single father, and Dolores' second husband.

=== Minor characters ===
- LuAnn Masicotte ("Mrs. Masicotte"): A wealthy widow and employer of Dolores' father.
- Jeanette Nord: A childhood friend of Dolores.
- Geneva Sweet: Childhood friend and long-time pen pal of Dolores' mother.
- Eddie Holland ("Uncle Eddie"): Younger brother of Dolores' mother, deceased.
- Rosalie and Stacia Pysyk: Twin girls who live down the street from Grandma's house and Dolores' bullies at St. Anthony's School.
- Norma French: A schoolmate of Dolores at St. Anthony's School.
- Gary: Mr. Pucci's life partner.
- Larry and Ruth Rosenfarb: A hippie couple that Dolores befriends after Grandma hires Larry to install wallpaper in her house.
- Naomi, Rochelle, Veronica: Dolores' dorm-mates at Merton College.
- Eric: A student at Merton College and boyfriend of Kippy.
- Domingos: A taxi driver in the Merton College area.
- Fred Burden: A patient at Project Outreach House, friend and admirer of Dolores.
- Chadley Massey and Marguerite Wing: Dolores' landlord and landlady in Montpelier, Vermont.
- Boomer and Paula: A couple that Dolores befriends in Montpelier. Boomer is a fellow teacher at the school where Dante works.
- Allyson: A student at Ocean Point Community College and later housemate of Dolores.
- Mr. and Mrs. Buchbinder: The couple that owns Buchbinder's Gift and Novelty Shop in Easterly, employers of Dolores.
- Bea Gutwax ("Mrs. Gutwax"): Owner of Gutwax's Bakery in Easterly and employer of Dolores.
- Arthur ("Jemal", "Chilly J") Kitchen: Thayer's teenaged son.

== Awards and nominations ==
- Oprah's Book Club selection for December 1996.
- New York Times notable book of the year.
