= I Know This Much Is True =

Book by Wally Lamb

- Early edition cover with Prize notice
- Author: Wally Lamb
- Cover artist: David Teplica
- Language: English
- Genre: Novel
- Publisher: HarperCollins
- Publication date: June 1998
- Publication place: United States
- Media type: Print (hardback & paperback)
- Pages: 901 pp (first edition, hardback)
- ISBN: 0-06-039162-6 (first edition, hardback)
- OCLC: 39465167
- Dewey Decimal: 813/.54 21
- LC Class: PS3562.A433 I3 1998

I Know This Much Is True is the second novel by Wally Lamb, published in 1998. It was featured in Oprah's Book Club for June 1998.

== Plot summary ==
The novel takes place in Three Rivers, Connecticut, in the early 1990s. Dominick Birdsey's identical twin Thomas has paranoid schizophrenia. With medication, Thomas is able to live his life in relative peace and work at a coffee stand, yet occasionally has severe episodes of illness. Thinking he is making a sacrificial protest that will stop the Gulf War, Thomas cuts off his own hand at a public library. Dominick sees him through the decision not to reattach the hand, and makes efforts on his behalf to free him from the inadequate and depressing hospital for the dangerously mentally ill.

In the process, Dominick contemplates his own difficult life as Thomas's brother, his marriage to his ex-wife, their only child dying of SIDS, and his hostility toward their stepfather. Dominick displays classic symptoms of PTSD as a result of stressors in his adult life. First in Thomas's interests, and then for his own sake, he sees therapist psychologist Rubina Patel, employed by the hospital. She helps Dominick come to understand Thomas's illness better and the family's accommodations to it.

In the course of Thomas's treatment, Dominick is covertly informed of sexual abuse taking place in the hospital and helps to expose the perpetrators. He succeeds in getting his brother released but Thomas soon dies, apparently by suicide. After Thomas's death, Dominick discovers the identity of their birth father; part African American and part Native American. All a secret their mother had shared with Thomas but not him.

In the midst of this, Dominick is reading the autobiography of his grandfather, Italian/Sicilian-born Domenico Tempesta. It discloses details about the legacy of twins in their family. Dominick learns about himself and his mother through his grandfather's writing.

He also discovers that his live-in girlfriend Joy has been seeing a gentleman on the side, who is her bisexual half-uncle. Joy has let the uncle watch her and Dominick during sex. She is HIV-positive, having contracted it from her secret lover. She asks Dominick to raise her baby if she dies. At first he resists, but after having found his way back into a relationship with his ex-wife, Dessa, they decide to remarry and adopt Joy's daughter. The book ends with Dominick able to cope with the considerable loss, failure, and sorrow in his personal and family history.

== Characters ==
- Dominick Birdsey: protagonist.
- Thomas Birdsey: Dominick's identical twin, a man with paranoid schizophrenia.
- Dr. Patel: Thomas's psychologist at Hatch, Dominick's therapist.
- Lisa Sheffer: Thomas's social worker, Dominick's friend.
- Dessa Constantine: Dominick's ex-wife, whom he remarries.
- Angela Birdsey: Dominick's and Dessa's baby daughter, dies of SIDS.
- Concettina Ipolita Tempesta Birdsey: Thomas's and Dominick's mother, daughter of Domenico and Ignazia Tempesta.
- Ray Birdsey: Thomas's and Dominick's stepfather.
- Leo and Angie (Athena Constantine) Blood: Dominick's best friend, Dessa's younger sister.
- Joy: Dominick's live-in girlfriend.
- Tyffanie Rose: Joy's and Thad's biological daughter, and Dominick and Dessa's adopted daughter.
- Thad: Joy's bisexual half-uncle and secret lover, Tyffanie Rose's father and great half-uncle.
- Ralph Drinkwater: Penny Ann Drinkwater's twin and later found to be Thomas and Dominick's cousin.
- Penny Ann Drinkwater: Ralph Drinkwater's twin, murdered as a small girl.
- Domenico Onofrio Tempesta (1880–1949): Thomas's and Dominick's grandfather from Sicily.
- Ignazia Tucci Tempesta (Violetta d'Annunzio): Dominick's beautiful grandmother from Pescara.
- Prosperine Tucci ("The Monkey"): Ignazia's best friend and lover, loathed by Domenico Tempesta.
- Pasquale Tempesta: Domenico Tempesta's younger brother.
- Vincenzo Tempesta: youngest brother of Domenico Tempesta.
- Concettina Ciccia: Dominick's great-grandmother; Domenico's mother.
- Alfio and Maricchia Ciccia: Domenico's maternal grandparents.
- Giacomo Tempesta: Domenico's father.

== TV adaptation ==
In October 2018, HBO announced they were planning a six-episode limited-series TV adaptation with Mark Ruffalo set to appear in the roles of both Dominick and Thomas Birdsey .

On March 1, 2020, HBO released a teaser trailer on YouTube for the limited series.

The series premiered on May 10, 2020.
