= Malcolm Baldrige =

Malcolm Baldrige may refer to:

- Howard M. Baldrige (1894–1985), congressman from Nebraska
- Malcolm Baldrige Jr. (1922–1987), United States Secretary of Commerce
- NOAAS Researcher (R 103), renamed the NOAAS Malcolm Baldrige (R 103) as a ship of the National Oceanic and Atmospheric Association
- The Malcolm Baldrige National Quality Award, named after Malcolm Baldrige, Jr
