= Howard Malcolm Baldrige =

Howard Malcolm Baldrige may refer to:

- Howard M. Baldrige (1894–1985), Nebraska State representative and father to Secretary Howard Malcolm Baldrige
- Howard M. Baldrige Jr. (1922–1987), 26th United States Secretary of Commerce
