= Albert W. Jefferis =

American politician (1868–1942)

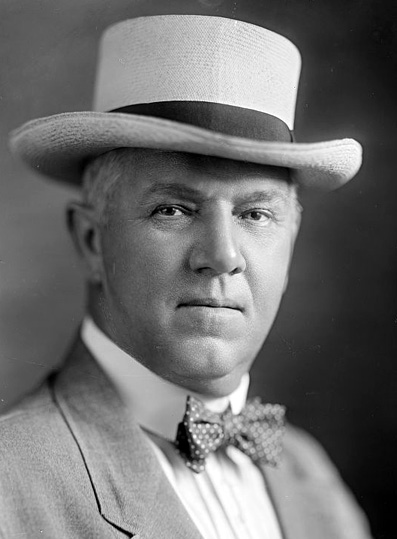

Member of the U.S. House of Representatives from Nebraska's 2nd district
- In office March 4, 1919 – March 3, 1923
- Preceded by: Charles O. Lobeck
- Succeeded by: Willis G. Sears

Personal details
- Born: December 7, 1868 Embreeville, Pennsylvania
- Died: September 14, 1942 (aged 73) Omaha, Nebraska
- Party: Republican
- Education: West Chester University; University of Michigan Law School

Albert Webb Jefferis (December 7, 1868 – September 14, 1942) was an American Republican Party politician.

Born near Embreeville, Pennsylvania, he attended public schools in Romansville, Pennsylvania and the West Chester Normal School for three years. He graduated from the law department of the University of Michigan, at Ann Arbor, Michigan, in 1893 and was admitted to the bar in the same year. He set up practice in Omaha, Nebraska. Jefferis was also the head football coach at Doane College—now known as Doane University—in Crete, Nebraska, for one season, in 1893.

Jefferis was a member of various Republican State and county committees. He was assistant county attorney for Douglas County, Nebraska, from 1896 to 1898. He ran in 1908 for the Sixty-first United States Congress and lost. He then became chairman of the Republican State convention in 1910. He succeeded in being elected to the Sixty-sixth and Sixty-seventh Congresses serving from March 4, 1919, to March 3, 1923. He ran unsuccessfully for the United States Senate in 1922 against Robert Beecher Howell.

Jefferis resumed the practice of law in Omaha. He was elected a delegate at large to the 1924 Republican National Convention. He was also the manager of the Coolidge-Dawes automobile caravan from Plymouth, Vermont, to Bellingham, Washington. He resumed his practice of law in Omaha, running once more unsuccessfully for United States senator in 1940. He failed to get the nomination. He died at Omaha, Nebraska, on September 14, 1942, and is buried in Forest Lawn Cemetery, Omaha.

Jefferis was a member of the Congregationalist Church, as well as a Freemason, an Elk, a Woodmen, and a member of Delta Chi.

== Head coaching record ==
Year	Team	Overall	Conference	Standing	Bowl/playoffs
Doane Tigers (Independent) (1893)
1893	Doane	2–2			
Doane:		2–2			
Total:		2–2			

U.S. House of Representatives
Preceded by Charles O. Lobeck (D)	Member of the U.S. House of Representatives from Nebraska's 2nd congressional district March 4, 1919 – March 3, 1923	Succeeded by Willis G. Sears (R)
