= Willis G. Sears =

American politician (1860–1949)

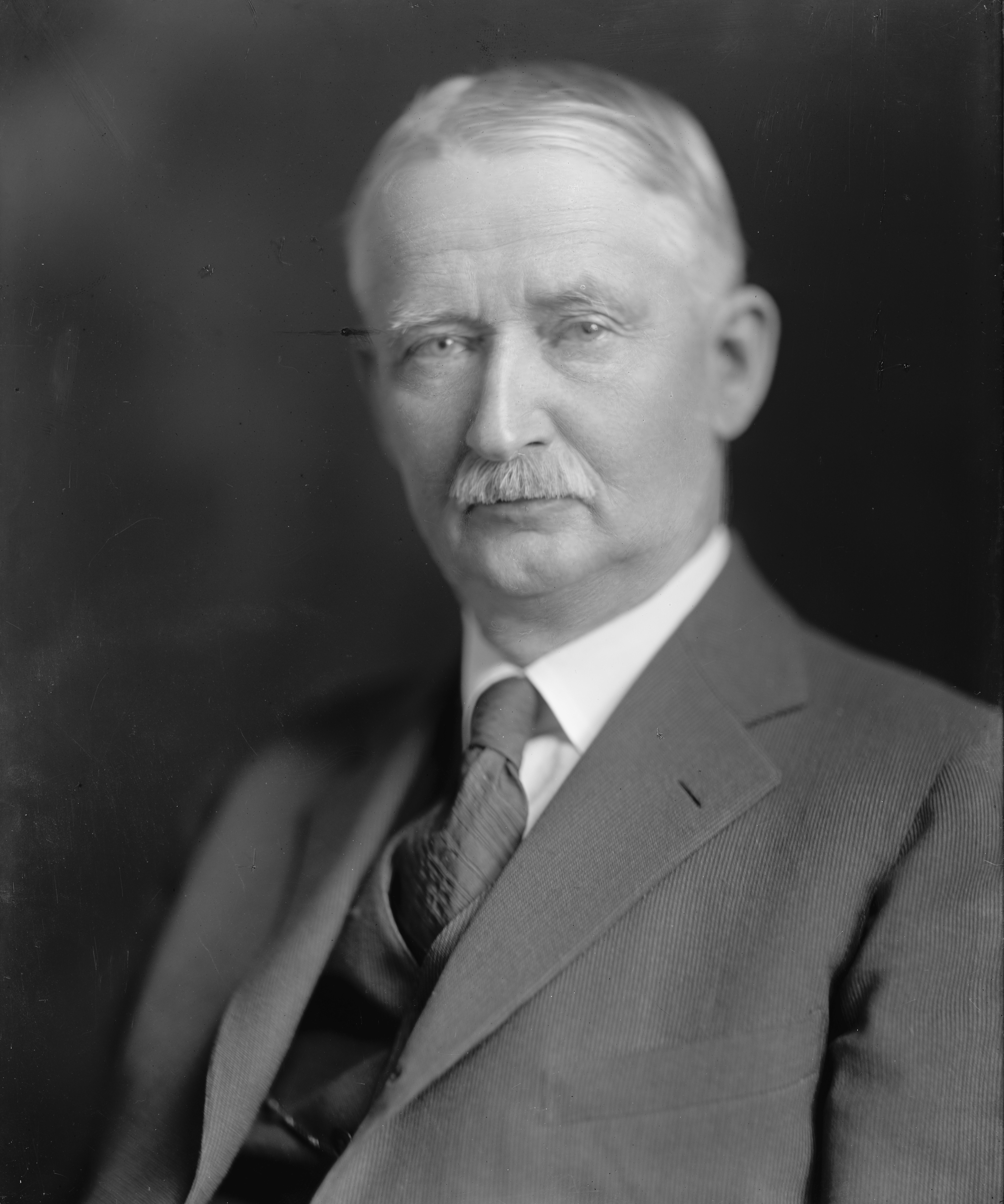

Member of the U.S. House of Representatives from Nebraska's 2nd district
- In office March 4, 1923 – March 3, 1931
- Preceded by: Albert W. Jefferis
- Succeeded by: H. Malcolm Baldrige

Member of the Nebraska House of Representatives
- In office 1901-1905

Personal details
- Born: August 16, 1860 Willoughby, Ohio
- Died: June 1, 1949 (aged 88) Omaha, Nebraska
- Party: Republican

Willis Gratz Sears (August 16, 1860 – June 1, 1949) was an American Republican Party politician.

Born in Willoughby, Ohio on August 16, 1860, Sears moved to Nebraska in 1879. He studied law at the University of Kansas at Lawrence, Kansas and was admitted to the bar in 1884. He set up practice in Tekamah, Nebraska and then became the prosecuting attorney for Burt County from 1895 to 1901.

Sears was elected a member of the Nebraska house of representatives in 1901, serving as speaker for his first year and as a normal representative until 1904. He was elected as judge of the fourth judicial district of Nebraska on November 6, 1903, serving until March 10, 1923, when he resigned having been elected to Congress. He was elected from Nebraska's 2nd district to the Sixty-eighth United States Congress and to the three succeeding Congresses serving from March 4, 1923, to March 3, 1931.

During his time, Sears was elected chairman of the U.S. House Committee on Expenditures in the Justice Department during the Sixty-ninth United States Congress and the chairman of the U.S. House Committee on Elections No. 3 during the Seventy-first United States Congress. He was an unsuccessful candidate for renomination in 1930 to the Seventy-second United States Congress. He resumed the practice of law in Nebraska and again was elected judge of the fourth judicial district of Nebraska serving from 1932 to 1948. He died in Omaha, Nebraska on June 1, 1949, and is buried in Tekamah Cemetery.

U.S. House of Representatives
Preceded by Albert W. Jefferis (R)	Member of the U.S. House of Representatives from Nebraska's 2nd congressional district March 4, 1923 – March 3, 1931	Succeeded by H. Malcolm Baldrige (R)
