= William Verity Jr. =

American businessman (1917–2007)

William Verity
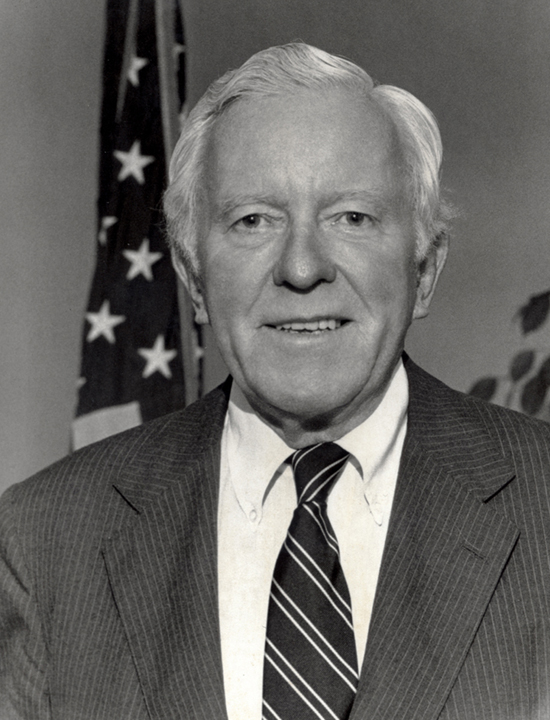
- Verity in 1981

27th United States Secretary of Commerce
- In office October 19, 1987 – January 30, 1989
- President: Ronald Reagan; George H. W. Bush
- Preceded by: Malcolm Baldrige Jr.
- Succeeded by: Robert Mosbacher

Personal details
- Born: Calvin William Verity Jr. January 26, 1917 Middletown, Ohio, U.S.
- Died: January 3, 2007 (aged 89) Beaufort, South Carolina, U.S.
- Party: Republican
- Spouse: Peggy Wymond
- Children: 3
- Education: Yale University (BA)

Military service
- Branch/service: United States Navy
- Years of service: 1942–1945
- Battles/wars: World War II

Calvin William Verity Jr. (January 26, 1917 – January 3, 2007) was an American government official and steel industrialist who served as the 27th United States secretary of commerce between 1987 and 1989, under President Ronald Reagan.

== Early life and education ==
He was born in Middletown, Ohio, on January 26, 1917, to Calvin William Verity and Elizabeth (O'Brien) Verity. He roomed with John F. Kennedy at Choate, a Connecticut boarding school, starting a friendship with the future president. He graduated from Phillips Exeter Academy and earned a Bachelor of Arts degree in economics from Yale University.

== Career ==
After graduating from college, Verity tramped around the world and worked as maître d' at an upscale Manhattan restaurant. He also served in the United States Navy from 1942 to 1945. Verity worked for most of his career at Armco Steel, a corporation founded by his grandfather, George Matthew Verity. He started there in 1940 and retired from Armco in 1982.

=== Secretary of Commerce ===
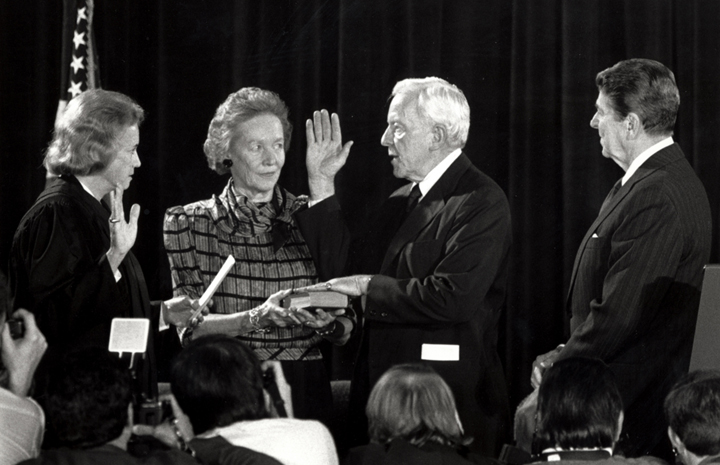
Secretary of Commerce Verity (center) to being sworn into office with the wife, Peggy W. Verity (left), to holder book, and the U.S. President Ronald Reagan (far right).

Between 1980 and 1981, Verity chaired the United States Chamber of Commerce. In 1981, he chaired Reagan's bipartisan task force on Private Sector Initiatives (PSI). In 1983, he was appointed a member of PSI's Advisory Council and later served on PSI's Board of Advisors. Between 1979 and 1984, he co-chaired the U.S.-U.S.S.R. Trade Economic Council, a private sector council of American and Soviet businessmen.

During Verity's time at the U.S. Department of Commerce, he established the Commerce Hall of Fame in 1988 to honor good department employees. In 1988, he also created the Office of Space Commerce to support the National Space Council. That office was an early version of the Office of Space Commercialization, an office created to promote the effective commercial use of outer space. According to Jonathan Chait of The New Republic, Verity kept a passage from Ayn Rand's novel Atlas Shrugged on his desk, including the line "How well you do your work . . . [is] the only measure of human value."

== Personal life ==
Verity's wife, the former Margaret Wymond Verity, known as Peggy, and they had two sons and a daughter together (Peggy Verity Power, Jonathan George Verity, and William Wymond Verity).

He died on January 3, 2007, a complications of pneumonia, in Beaufort, South Carolina, at the age of 89, twenty-three days before his 90th birthday. His wife, Peggy Verity, died on Wednesday, January 20, 1999, at age 81. He is interred in Woodside Cemetery, Middletown, Ohio.

Political offices
Preceded by Malcolm Baldrige	U.S. Secretary of Commerce; Served under: Ronald Reagan; October 19, 1987 – January 30, 1989	Succeeded by Robert Mosbacher
