= Charles O. Lobeck =

American politician

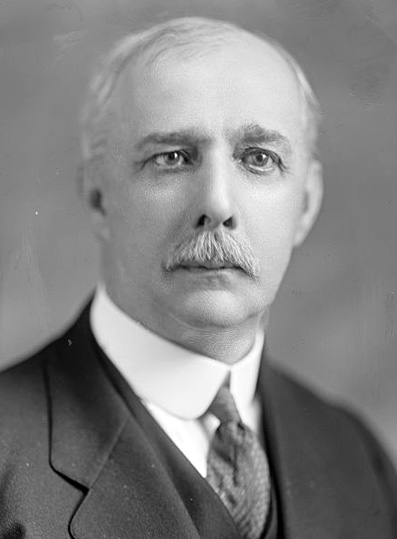

Member of the U.S. House of Representatives from Nebraska's 2nd district
- In office March 4, 1911 – March 3, 1919
- Preceded by: Gilbert Hitchcock
- Succeeded by: Albert W. Jefferis

Member of the Nebraska Senate
- In office 1893

Personal details
- Born: April 6, 1852 Andover, Illinois
- Died: January 30, 1920 (aged 67) Omaha, Nebraska
- Party: Democratic

Charles Otto Lobeck (April 6, 1852 – January 30, 1920) was a Nebraska politician who served four terms as a United States representative.

Born in Andover, Illinois, he attended German Wallace College (now Baldwin-Wallace College) in Berea, Ohio and the Dyhrenfurth Commercial College in Chicago, Illinois. He moved to Dayton, Iowa in 1869 finding a job as a clerk in a general store. He was a commercial traveler in Iowa and Nebraska from 1875 to 1892. In 1892 he engaged in the hardware business in Omaha, Nebraska and worked until 1895.

Also in 1892 he was elected as a Republican to the Nebraska state senate serving in 1893. From 1897 to 1903 he served in the Omaha city council, also selling real estate and insurance on the side. He switched parties to become a Democrat. He was a Presidential Elector for Nebraska in 1900. He served as city controller from 1903 until 1911.

He was elected as a Democrat to the Sixty-second United States Congress and to the three succeeding Congresses serving from March 4, 1911, to March 3, 1919. During his time in the House he became chairman of the U.S. House Committee on Expenditures in the Treasury Department during the Sixty-third through Sixty-fifth Congresses. He unsuccessfully ran for reelection in 1918, and afterward returned to the real estate and insurance business. He died in Omaha and is buried in Prospect Hill Cemetery in Omaha. He was a member of the Methodist church.

U.S. House of Representatives
Preceded by Gilbert Hitchcock (D)	Member of the U.S. House of Representatives from Nebraska's 2nd congressional district March 4, 1911 – March 3, 1919	Succeeded by Albert W. Jefferis (R)
