= Howard M. Baldrige =

American politician

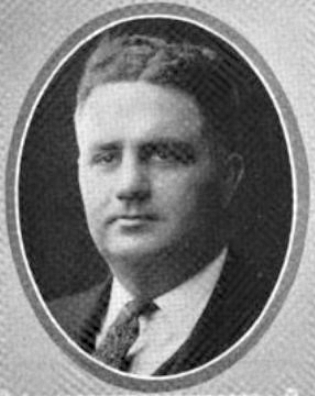

Member of the U.S. House of Representatives from Nebraska's 2nd district
- In office March 4, 1931 – March 3, 1933
- Preceded by: Willis G. Sears
- Succeeded by: Edward R. Burke

Personal details
- Born: Howard Malcolm Baldrige; June 23, 1894 Omaha, Nebraska, U.S.
- Died: January 19, 1985 (aged 90) Southbury, Connecticut, U.S.
- Party: Republican
- Education: Yale University; University of Nebraska College of Law
- Occupation: Lawyer

Military service
- Allegiance: United States
- Branch/service: Army
- Years of service: 1942–1945

Howard Malcolm Baldrige (June 23, 1894 – January 19, 1985) was an American politician. He was a Republican from Nebraska.

== Biography ==
=== Early life and ancestors ===
Baldrige was born on June 23, 1894, in Omaha, Nebraska, the son of Nebraska state senator Howard Hammond Baldrige (1864–1928) and Letitia Blanche Coffey.

=== Education ===
Baldrige graduated from Omaha High School in 1912. He attended Phillips Academy in Andover, Massachusetts, in 1914 and he graduated in 1918 from Yale University in New Haven, Connecticut where he was a member of Skull and Bones and captain of the wrestling team. He was also a member of Psi Upsilon and was a letterman in football at Yale.

In World War I, he served as captain of Battery F, Three Hundred and Thirty-eighth Field Artillery for the United States. In 1921, he graduated from the University of Nebraska College of Law and was admitted to the bar, setting up practice in Omaha.

=== Marriage and family ===
On November 30, 1921, he was married to Regina Katherine Connell at Omaha. She was born at Omaha, Douglas County, Nebraska on September 23, 1896, the daughter of Dr. Ralph Wardlaw Connell and Katherine E Walsh. She was a 1921 graduate of Wellesley College. Her uncle, William James Connell, was a Nebraska Republican politician and served as a member of the United States House of Representatives for Nebraska's 1st congressional district. Her first cousin, Dr. Karl Albert Connell, invented the gas mask used by American troops during World War I.

They were the parents of three children, Howard Malcolm Baldrige, Jr., born October 4, 1922; Robert Connell Baldrige, born November 9, 1924, and Letitia Baldrige, born February 9, 1926.

=== Political career ===
He served in the Nebraska state house of representatives in 1923 and was a delegate to the 1924 Republican National Convention and the 1928 Republican National Convention. He was elected to the Seventy-second United States Congress as a representative for the second district and served from March 4, 1931, to March 3, 1933. He was an unsuccessful candidate for reelection in 1932.

=== Post political career ===
Afterwards, he resumed the practice of law. During the Second World War, he entered the Army on June 10, 1942, and became a major in the United States Army Air Corps. He was discharged as a colonel on October 25, 1945, resuming law practice with offices in New York City and Washington, D.C. He was a resident of Washington, Connecticut, until his death. He died on January 19, 1985, in Southbury, Connecticut. He is buried at Forest Lawn Cemetery in Omaha.

== Notes ==
U.S. House of Representatives
Preceded by Willis G. Sears (R)	Member of the U.S. House of Representatives from Nebraska's 2nd congressional district March 4, 1931 – March 3, 1933	Succeeded by Edward R. Burke (D)
