= 1924 Republican National Convention =

American political convention

- 1924 presidential election
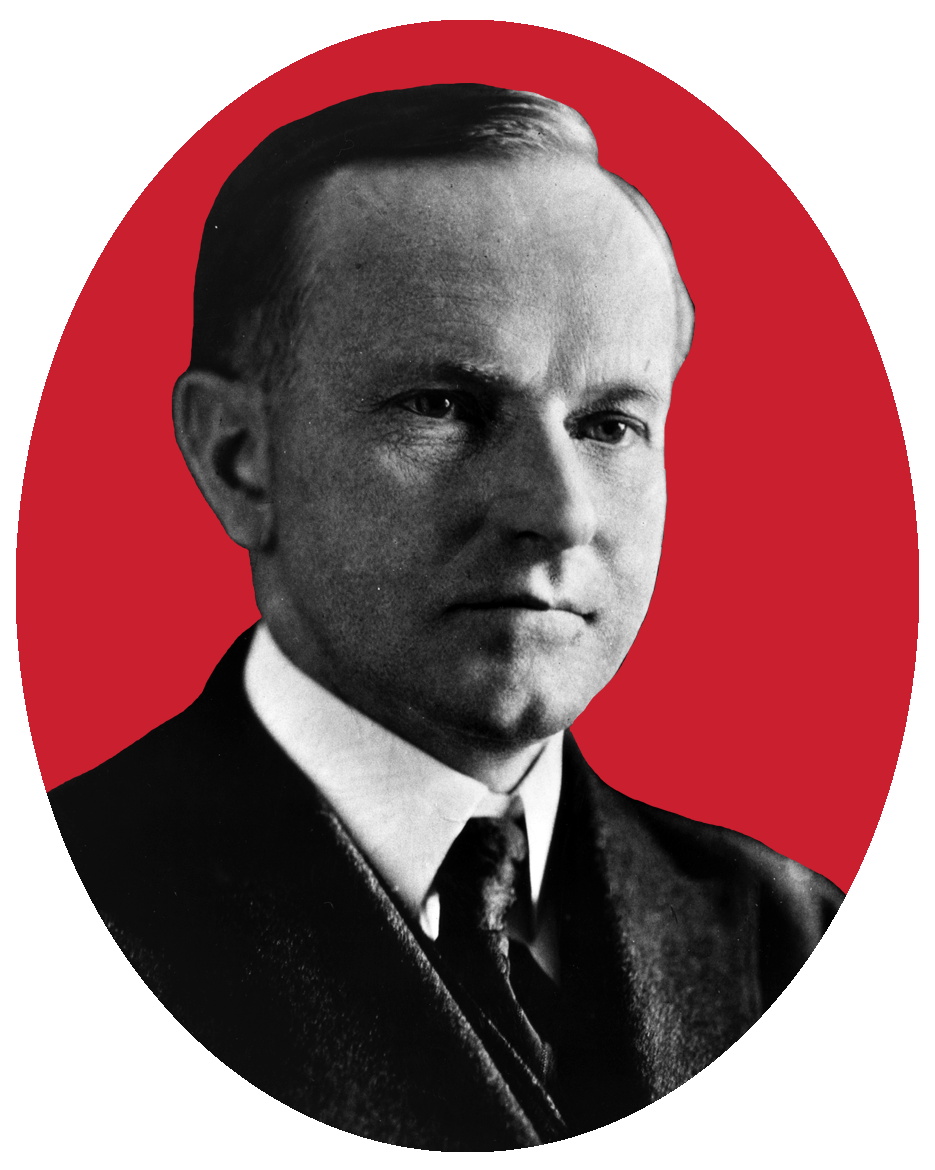
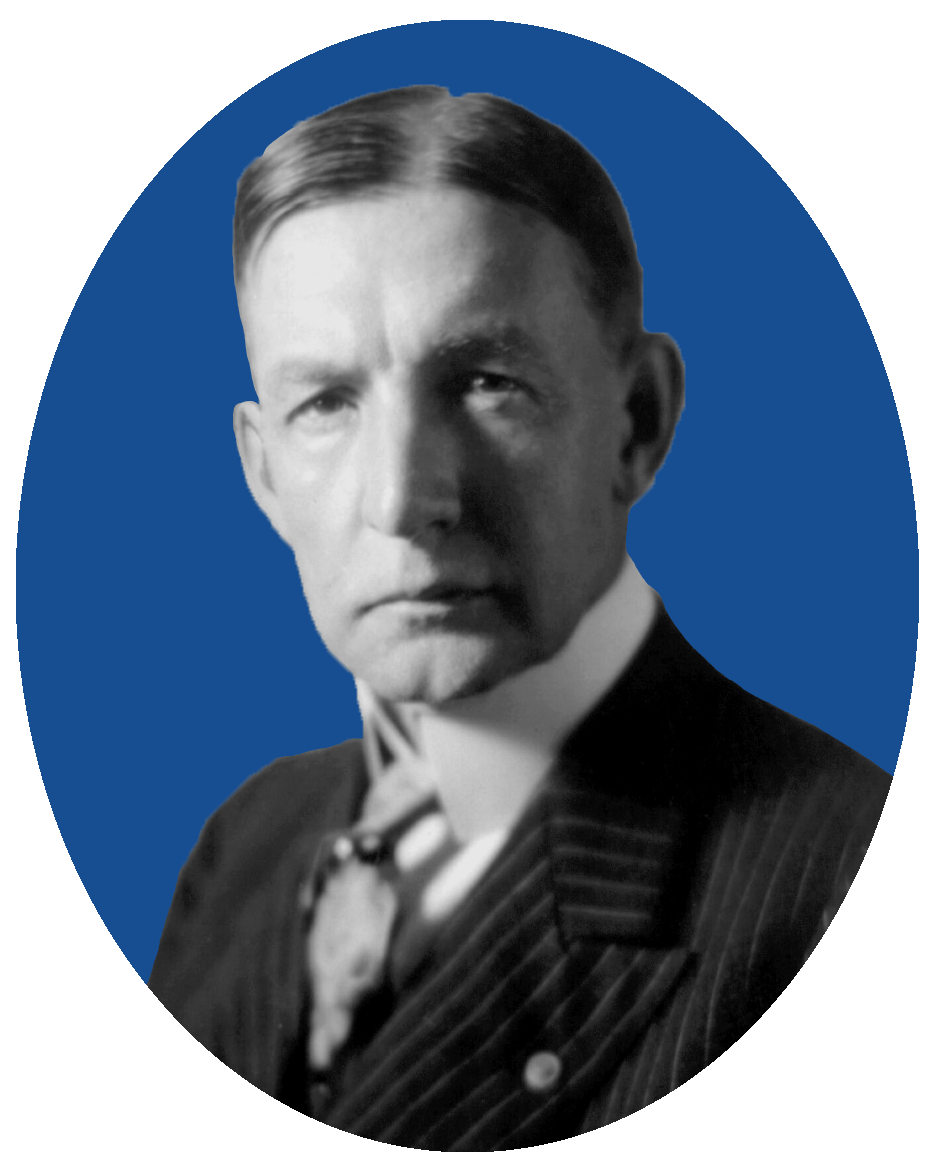
- Nominees; Coolidge and Dawes

Convention
- Dates: June 10–12, 1924
- City: Cleveland, Ohio
- Venue: Public Auditorium

Candidates
- Presidential nominee: Calvin Coolidge of Massachusetts
- Vice-presidential nominee: Charles G. Dawes of Illinois

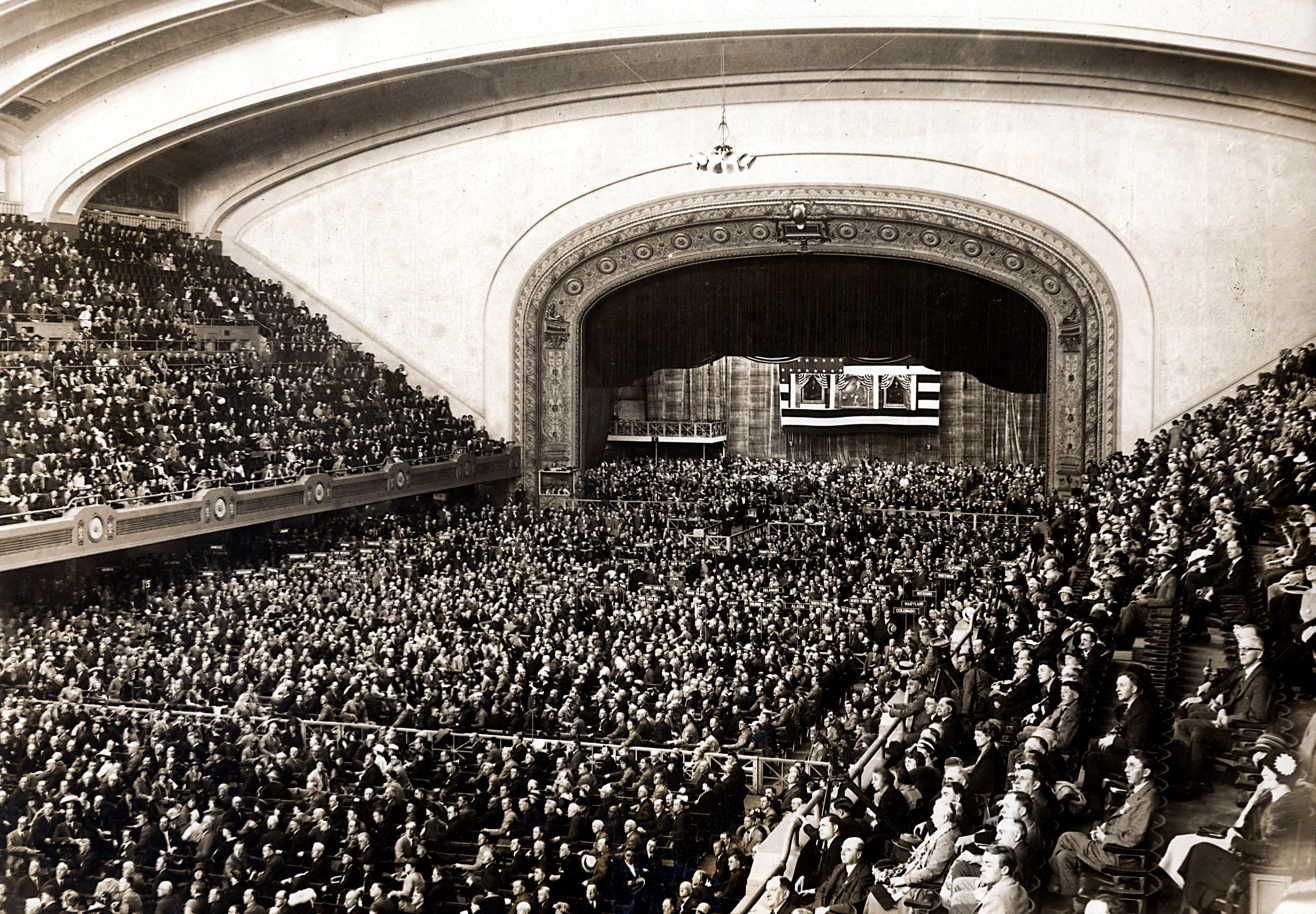
Convention in session

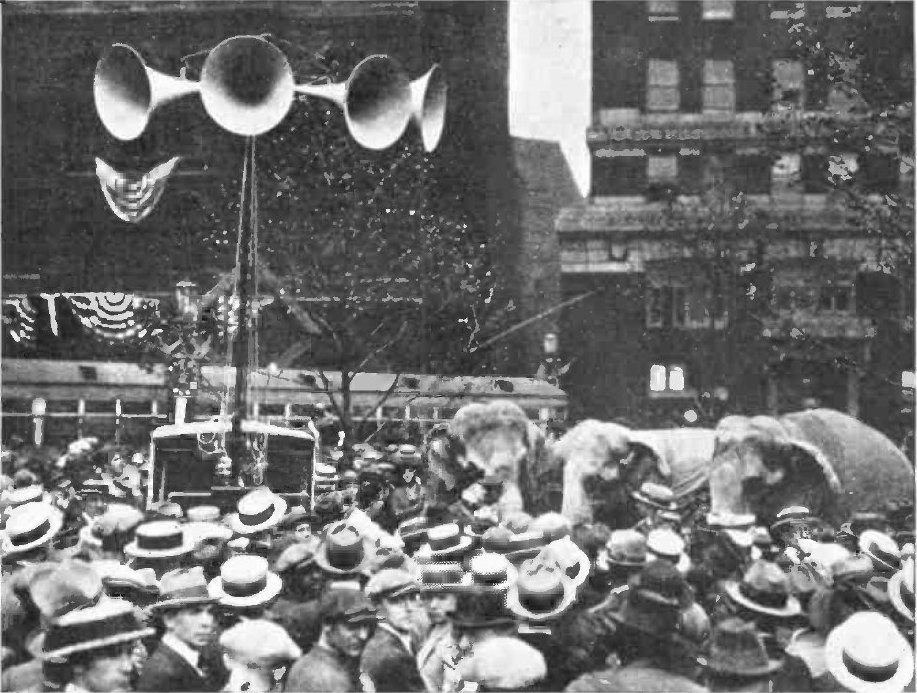
Crowd gathered outside of the Public Auditorium during the convention

The 1924 Republican National Convention was held in Cleveland, Ohio, at the Public Auditorium, from June 10 to 12.

Incumbent President Calvin Coolidge was nominated for a full term and went on to win the general election. The convention nominated former Illinois Governor Frank Orren Lowden for vice president on the second ballot, but he declined the nomination. The convention then selected Charles G. Dawes. Also considered for the nomination was Senator Charles Curtis of Kansas, a future vice president.

== Delegates ==
For this convention the method of allocating delegates changed in order to reduce the overrepresentation of the South. This effort proved only partly successful as Southern delegates proved to be more overrepresented than they had been in 1916 or 1920, though they were not as overrepresented as they had been in 1912 and earlier.

There were 120 female delegates, 11% of the total. (Note: Women's participation in national GOP conventions declined after 1924 and did not reach 11% again until 1952.) The Republican National Committee approved a rule providing for a national committeeman and a national committeewoman from each state.

== Ku Klux Klan presence ==
The head of the Ku Klux Klan, Imperial Wizard Hiram Wesley Evans, was in the city for the convention but maintained a low public profile. Time featured Evans in a cover photograph in conjunction with an article about the organization's role in the Republican convention, dubbing it "the Kleveland Konvention." As with the 1924 Democratic National Convention, some delegates supported adding a condemnation of the Ku Klux Klan by name into the party platform, but they lacked enough support to bring their proposed language to a vote.

== Presidential nomination ==
=== Presidential candidates ===
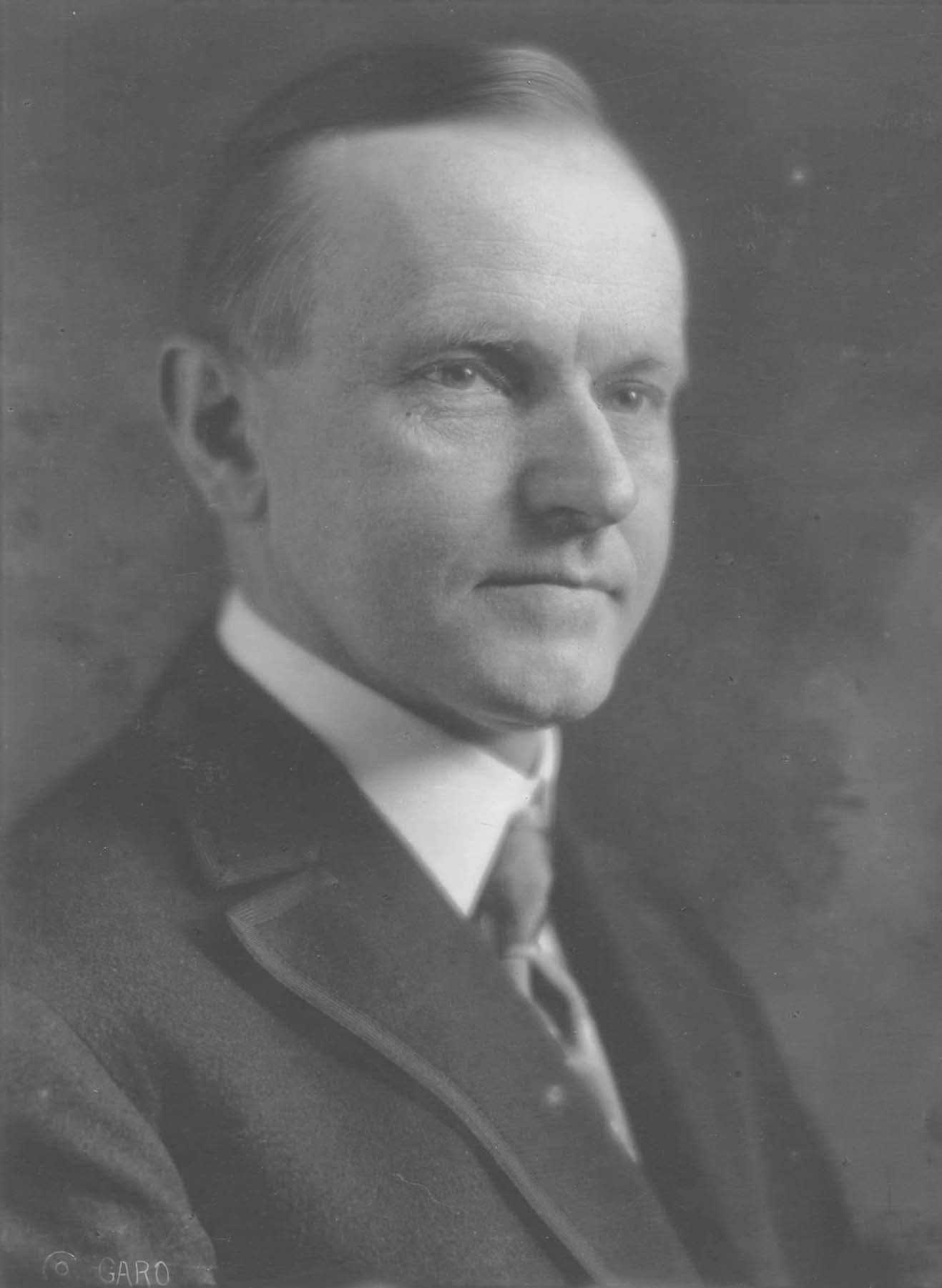
President
Calvin Coolidge
of Massachusetts

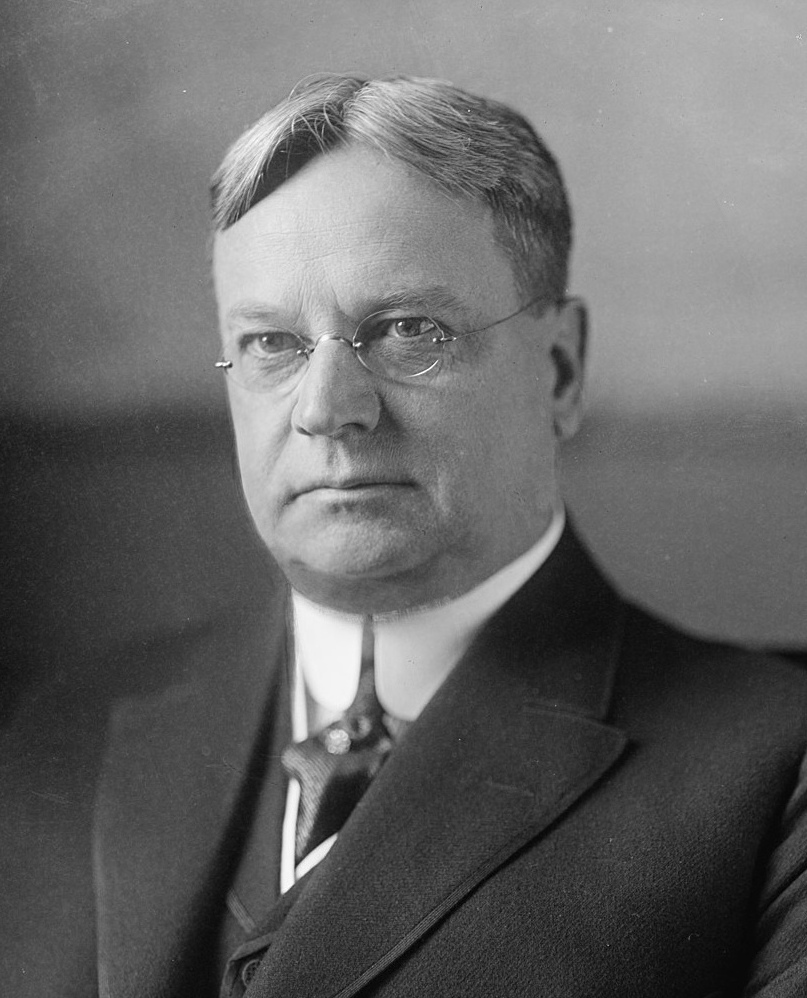
Senator
Hiram Johnson
of California
(Not Nominated)

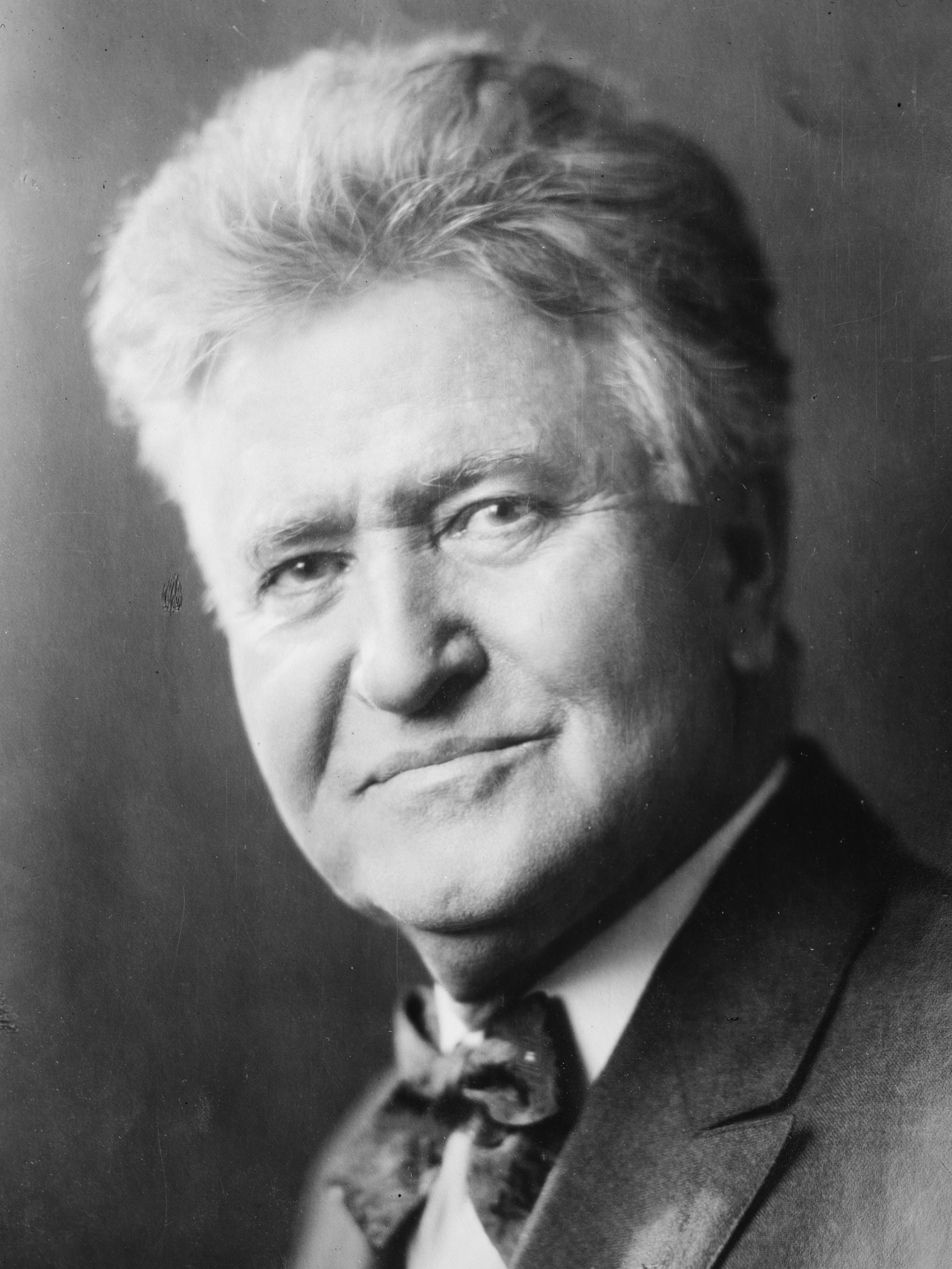
Senator
Robert M. La Follette
of Wisconsin
(Not Nominated)

Coolidge faced a challenge from California Senator Hiram Johnson and Wisconsin Senator Robert M. La Follette in the 1924 Republican primaries. Coolidge fended off his progressive challengers with convincing wins in the Republican primaries, and was assured of the 1924 presidential nomination by the time the convention began. After his defeat in the primaries, La Follette ran a third party candidacy that attracted significant support.

=== Declined to run ===
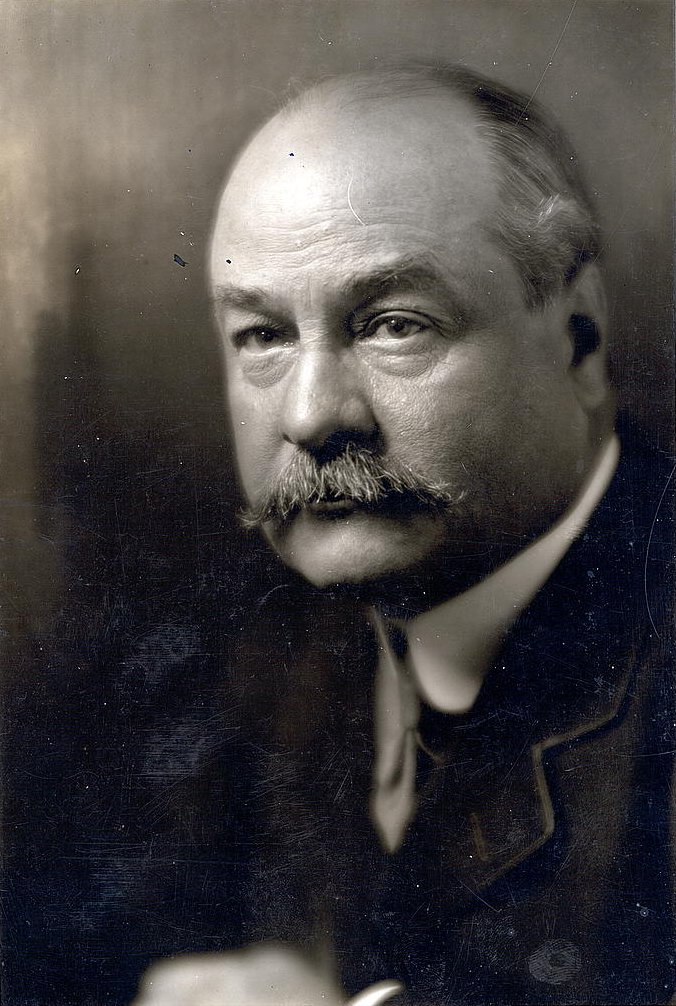
Columbia President
Nicholas Murray Butler
of New York

Secretary of Commerce
Herbert Hoover
of California

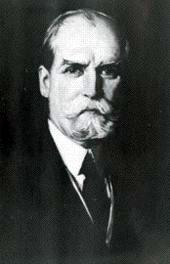
Secretary of State
Charles Evans Hughes
of New York

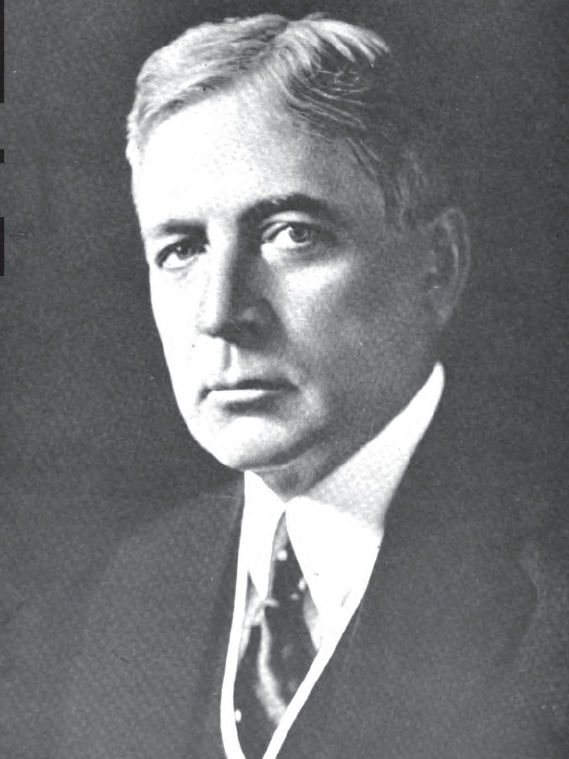
Former Governor
Frank Orren Lowden
of Illinois

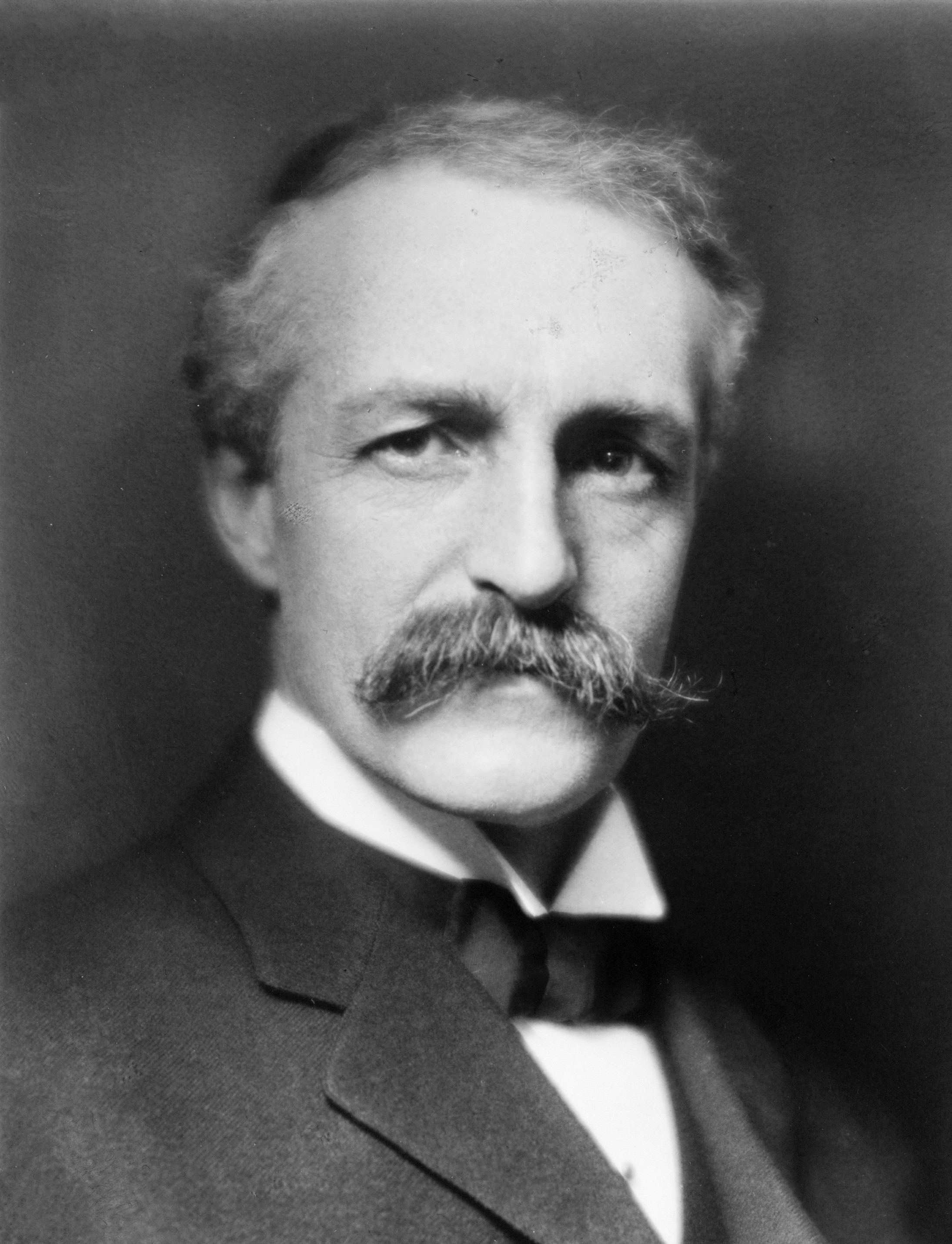
Governor
Gifford Pinchot
of Pennsylvania

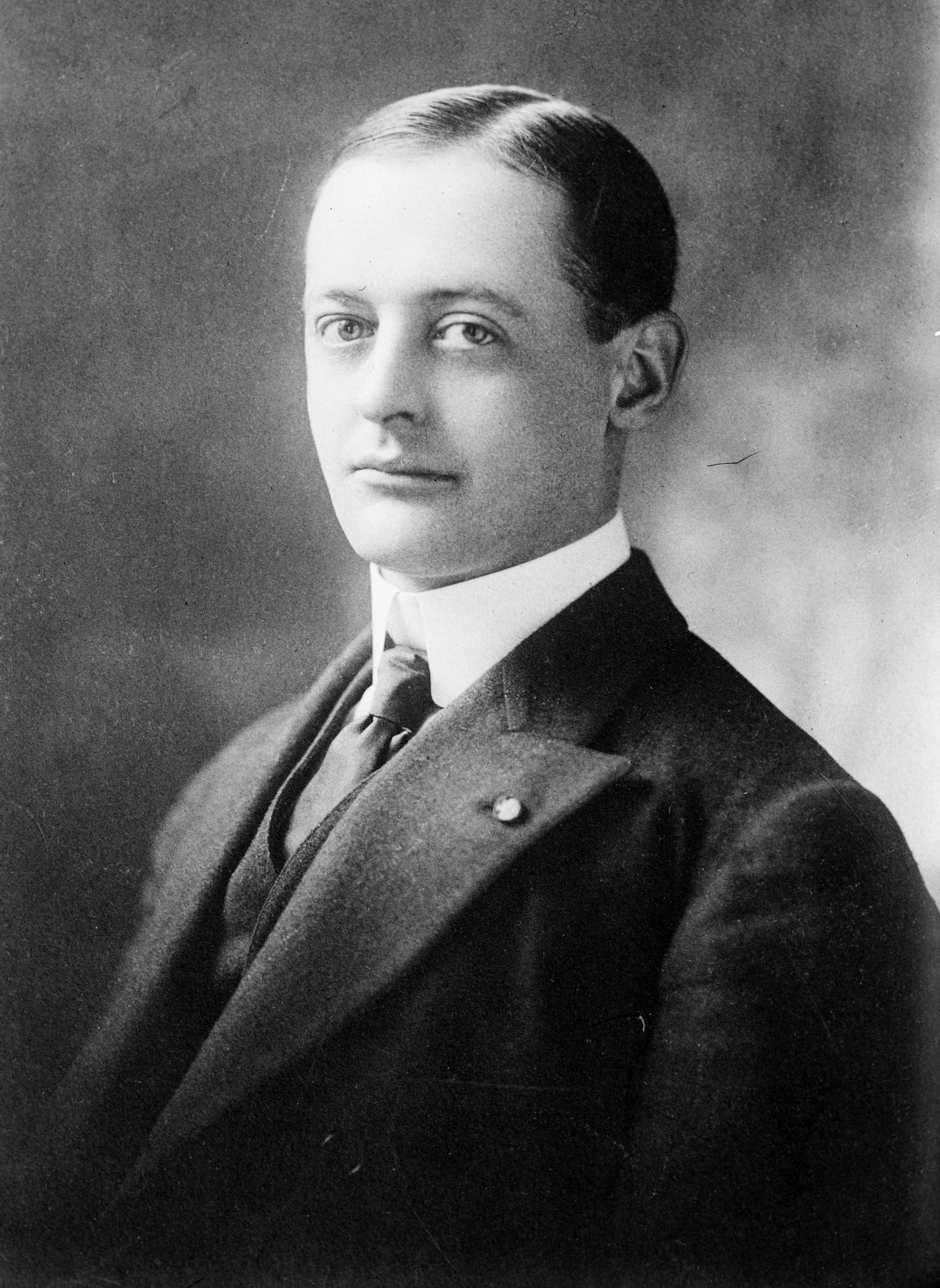
Senator
James Wadsworth Jr.
of New York

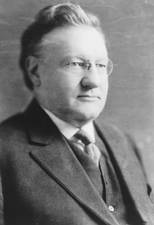
Senator
James E. Watson
of Indiana

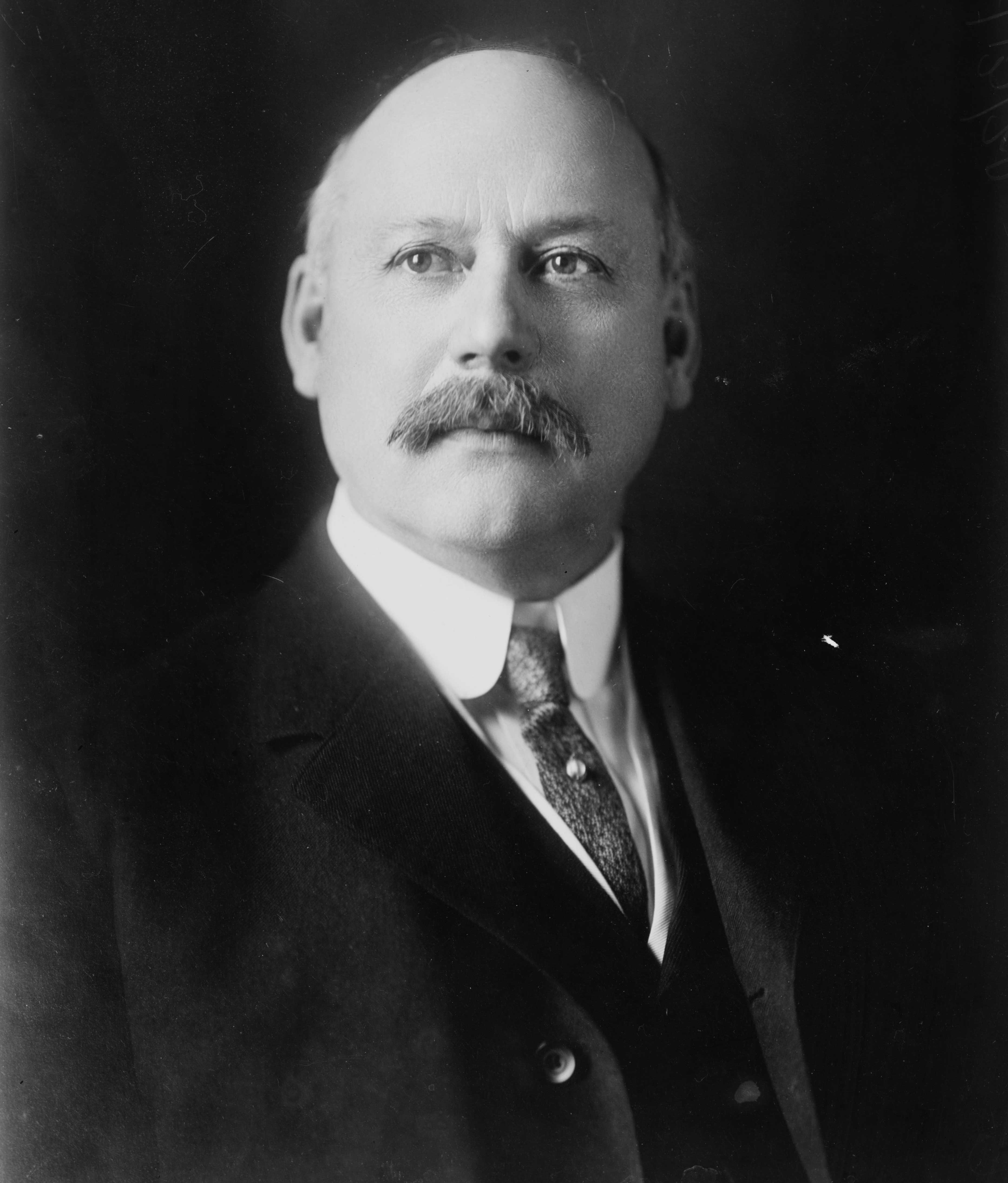
Secretary of War
John W. Weeks
of Massachusetts

Presidential Balloting
Candidate	1st	Unanimous
Coolidge	1,065	1,109
La Follette	34	
Johnson	10	

Presidential Balloting / 3rd Day of Convention (June 12, 1924)

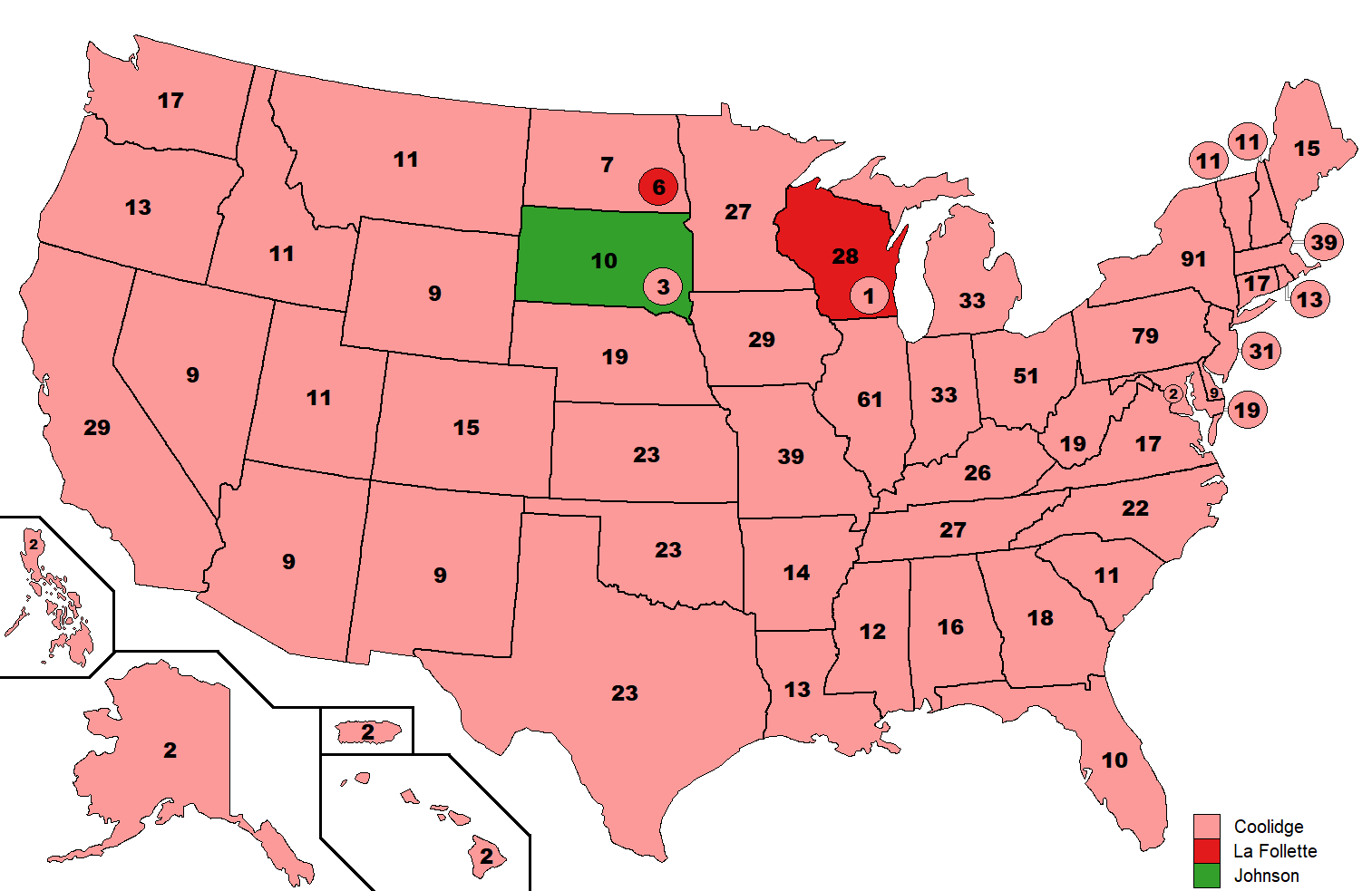
1st Presidential Ballot

== Vice Presidential nomination ==
=== Vice Presidential candidates ===
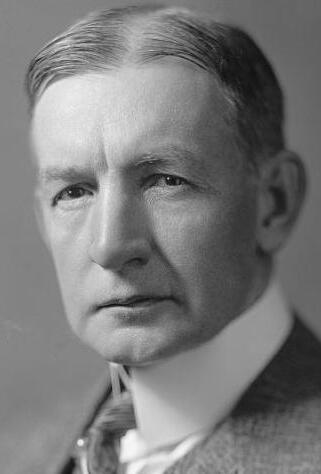
Former Budget Director
Charles G. Dawes
of Illinois

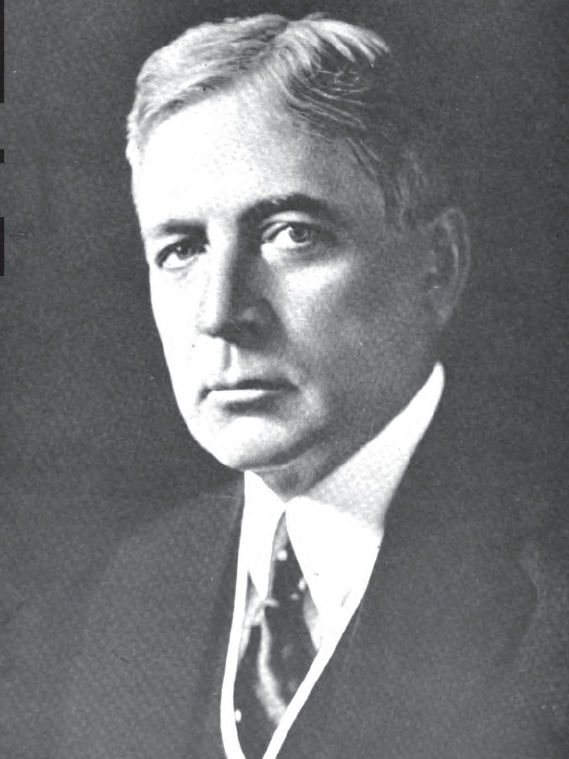
Former Governor
Frank Orren Lowden
of Illinois
(Rejected Nomination)

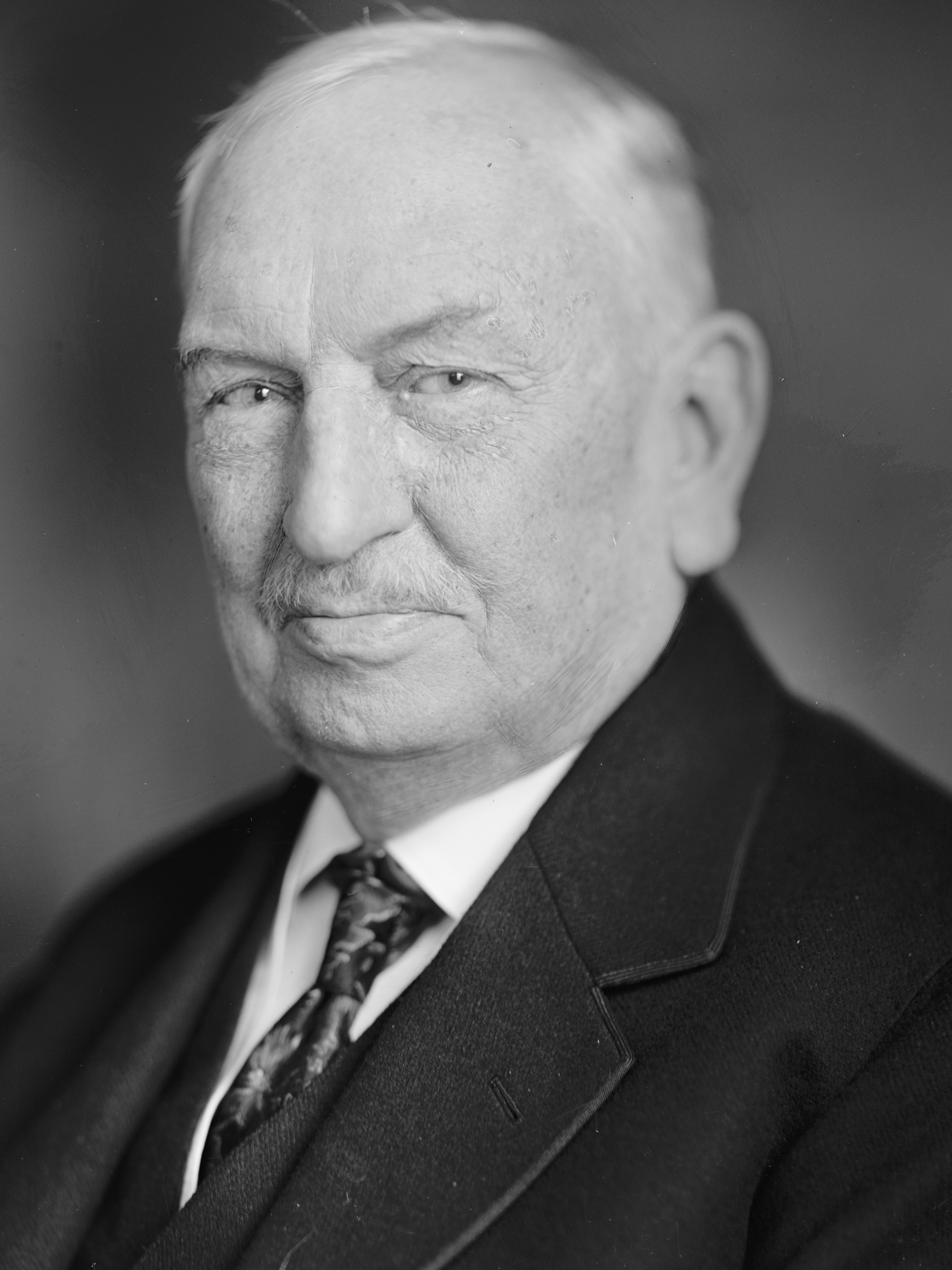
Representative
Theodore E. Burton
of Ohio
(Not Nominated)

Commerce Secretary
Herbert Hoover
of California
(Not Nominated)

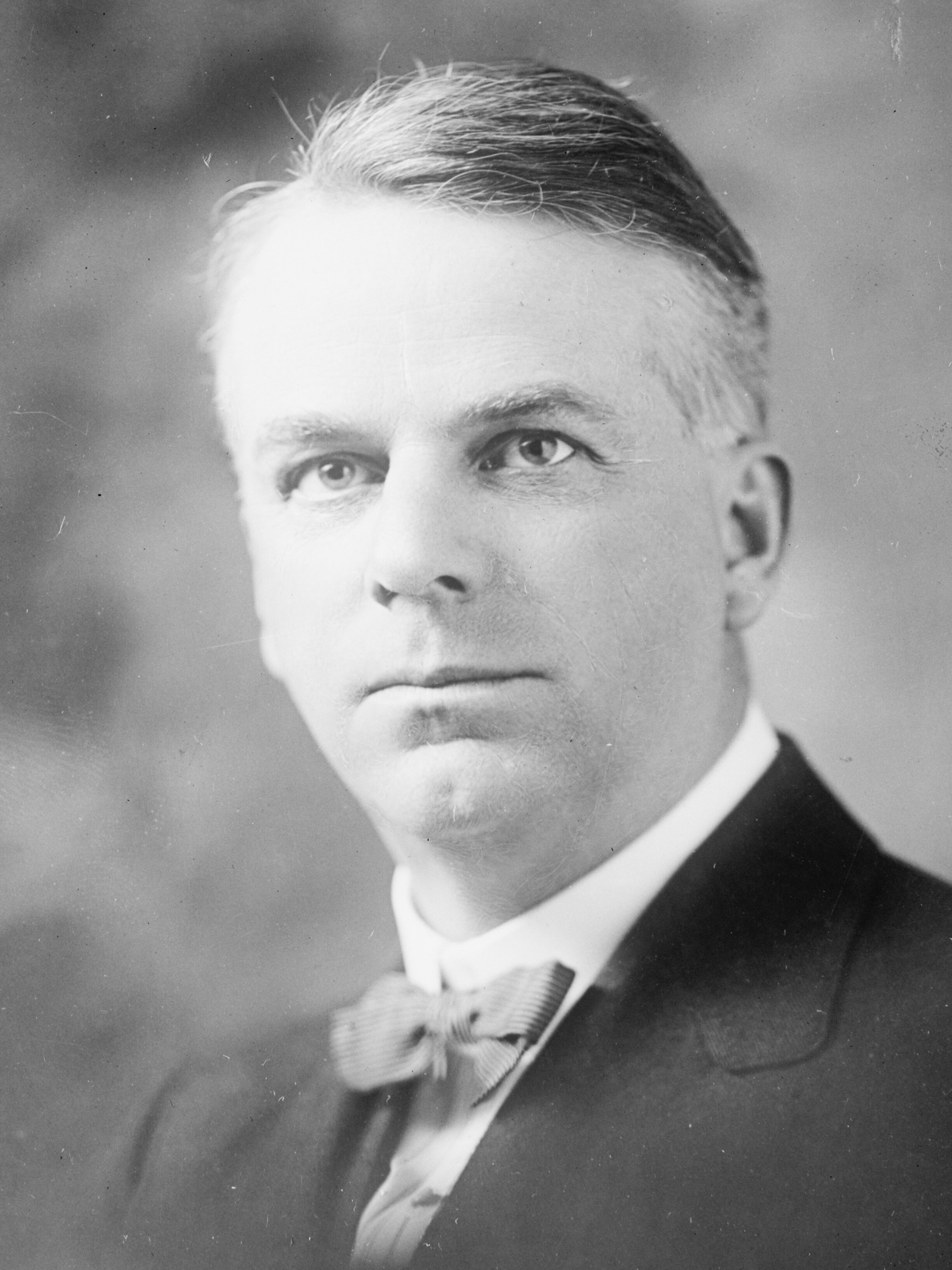
Circuit Court Judge
William S. Kenyon
of Iowa

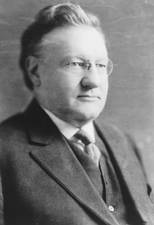
Senator
James E. Watson
of Indiana

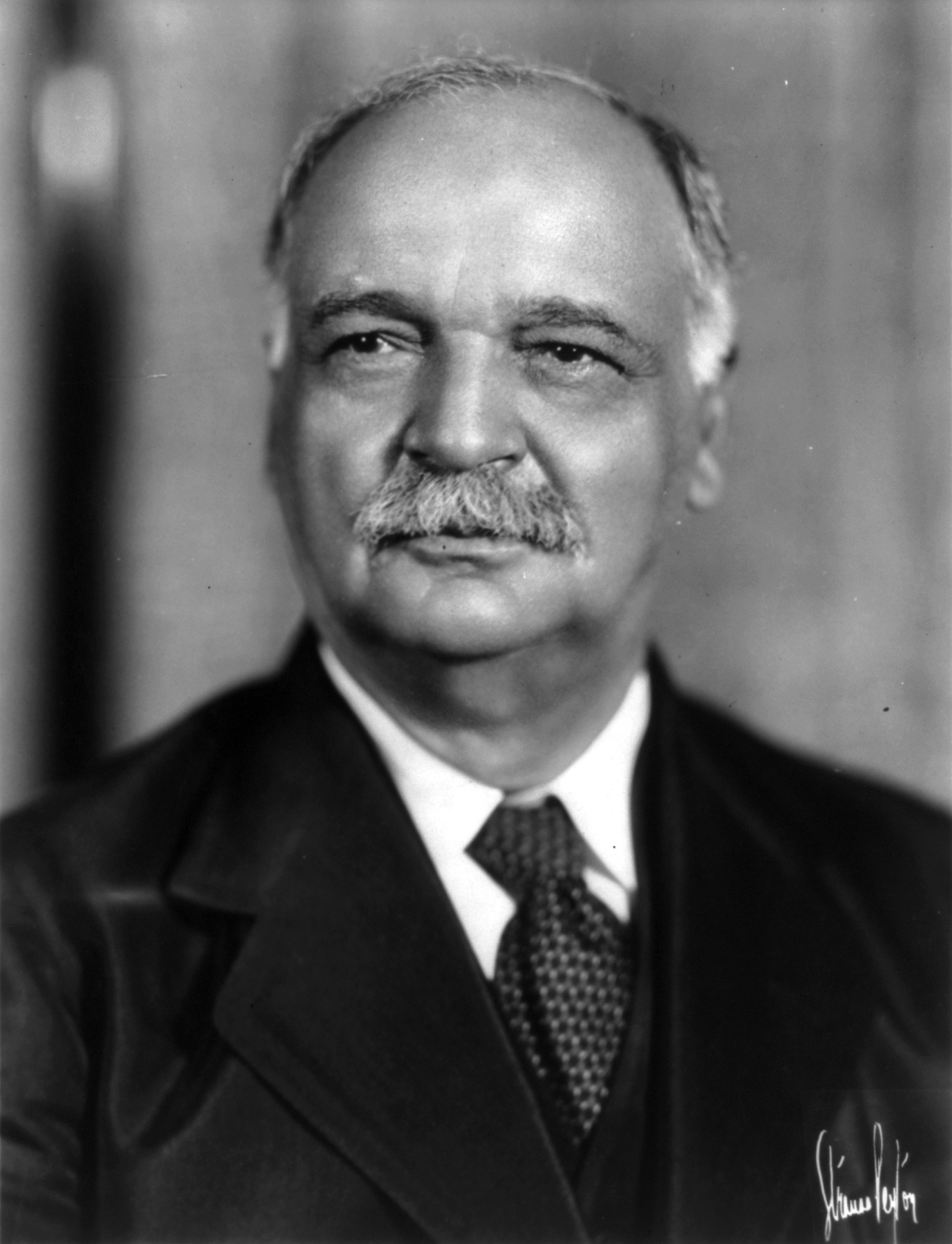
Senate Majority Whip
Charles Curtis
of Kansas

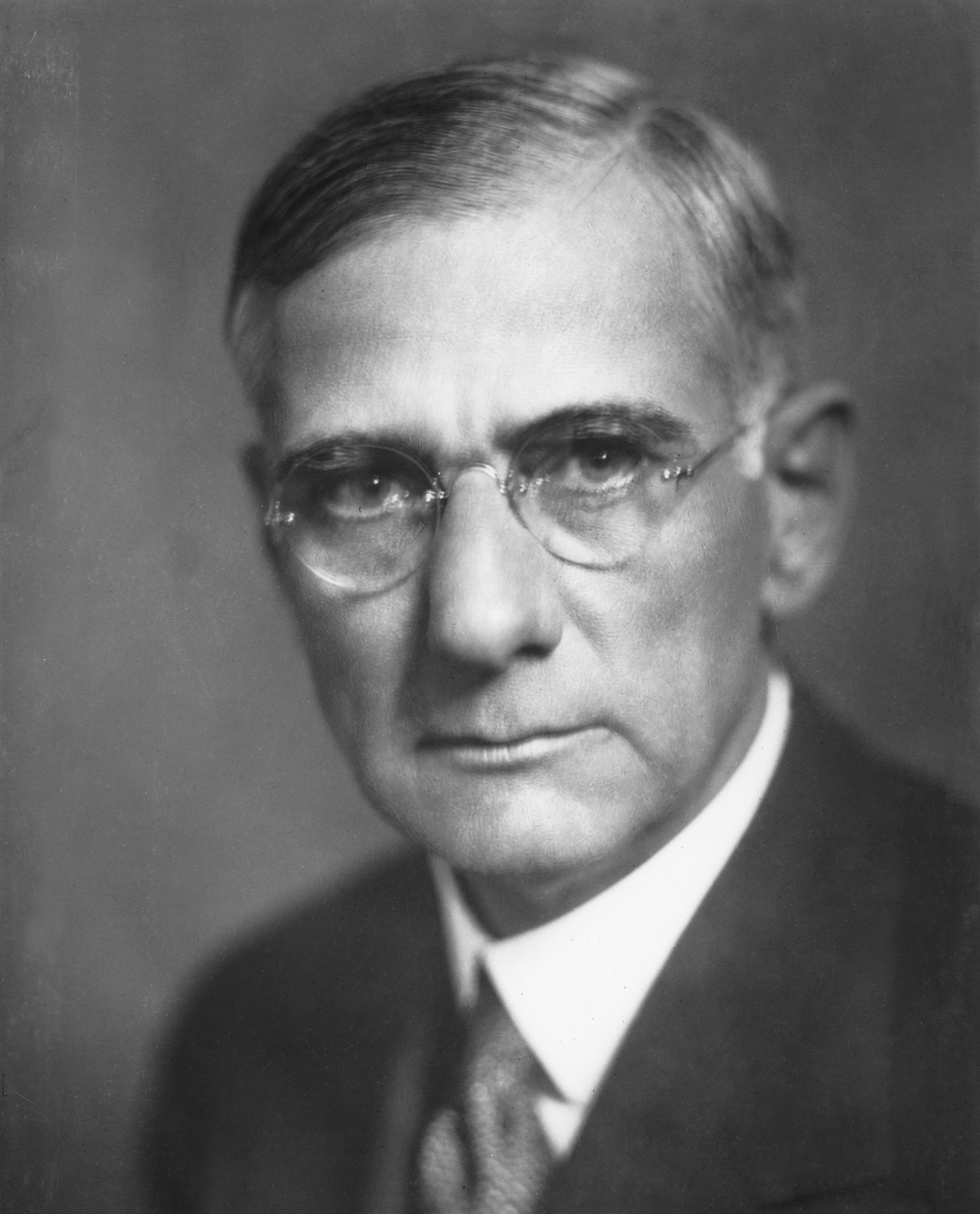
Governor
Arthur M. Hyde
of Missouri

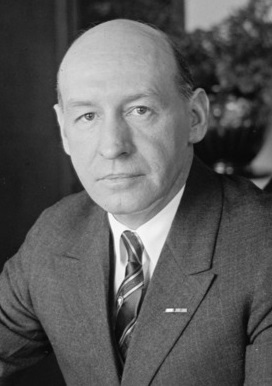
Veterans Director
Frank T. Hines
of Utah

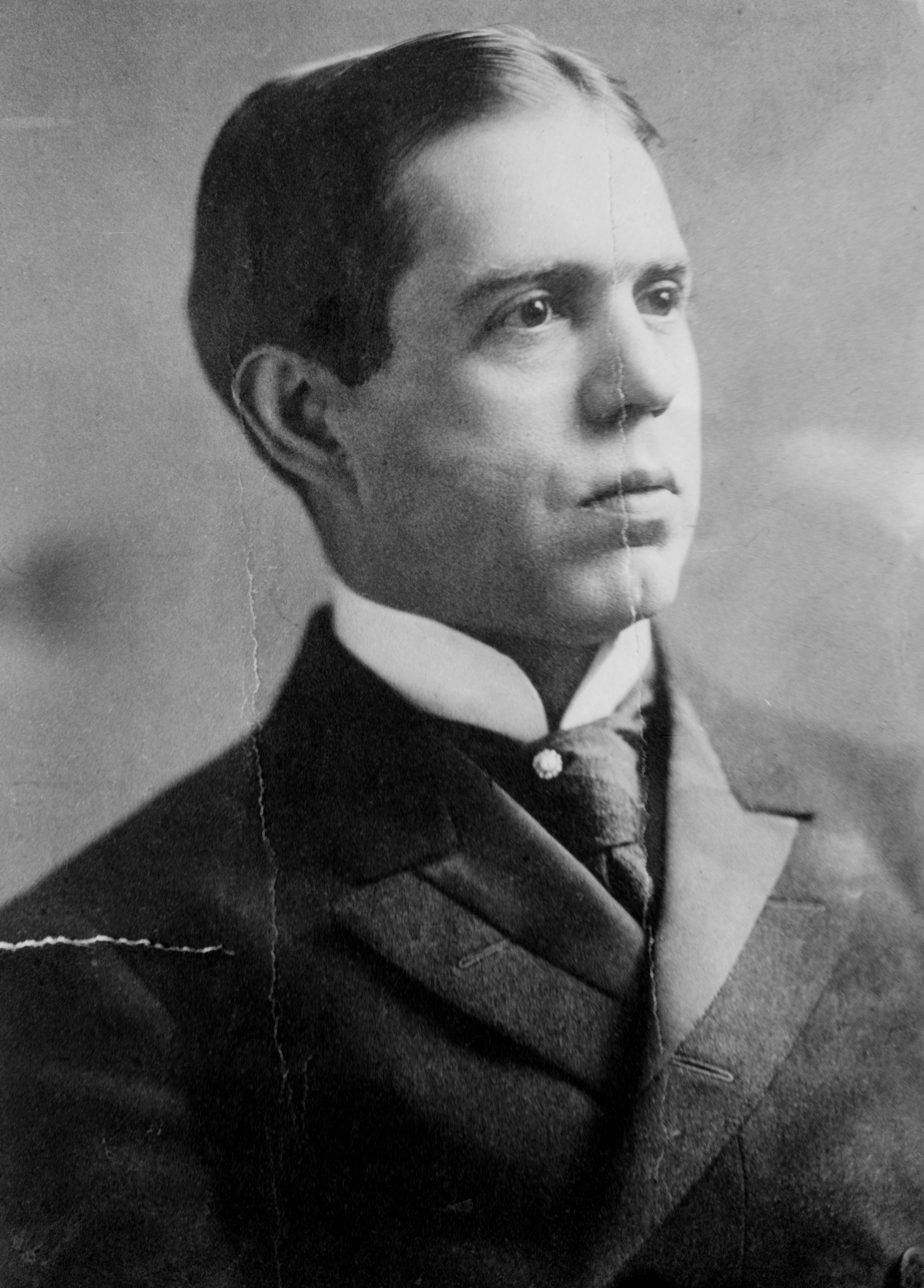
Former Senator
William P. Jackson
of Maryland

As Calvin Coolidge had ascended to the presidency following the death of Warren G. Harding on August 2, 1923, he served the remainder of Harding's term without a vice president as the Twenty-fifth Amendment to the United States Constitution had not yet been passed. With Coolidge having locked up the presidential nomination, most attention was focused on the vice presidential nomination.

Secretary of Commerce Herbert Hoover of California and appellate judge William Kenyon of Iowa were seen as the front-runners for the nomination, as both were popular Western progressives who could provide balance to a ticket led by a conservative from Massachusetts. Coolidge's first choice was reported to be Idaho Senator William E. Borah, also a progressive Westerner, but Borah declined to be considered. Illinois Governor Frank O. Lowden, University of Michigan president Marion Leroy Burton, Ambassador Charles B. Warren of Michigan, Washington Senator Wesley Livsey Jones, college president John Lee Coulter of North Dakota, General James Harbord, and General Charles Dawes also had support as potential running mates. Despite saying that he would not accept the nomination, Lowden was nominated for Vice President on the second ballot over Dawes, Kenyon, and Ohio Representative Theodore E. Burton. However, Lowden declined, an action, that has never been repeated and is now considered unthinkable. The convention then held another ballot, with Coolidge favoring Hoover. However, the delegates picked Dawes, partly as a reaction to the perceived dominance of Coolidge in running the convention.

Vice Presidential Balloting
Candidate	1st	2nd (Before Shifts)	2nd (After Shifts)	Unanimous	3rd	Unanimous
Lowden	222	413	766	1,109	0	
Dawes	149	111	49		682.5	1,109
Burton	139	288	94		0	
Hoover	0	0	0		234.5	
Kenyon	172	95	68		75	
Graham	81	0	0		0	
Watson	79	55	7		45	
Curtis	56	31	24		0	
Hyde	55	36	36		0	
Norris	35	2	2		29	
Brookhart	0	31	31		0	
Hines	29	15	0		0	
March	28	0	0		0	
Taylor	27	0	0		0	
Jackson	23	0	0		0	
Warren	0	23	23		0	
DuPont	0	0	0		11	
Dixon	0	1	1		6	
Sanders	0	0	0		4	
Harbord	3	0	0		0	
Beveridge	2	0	0		0	
Coulter	0	1	1		0	
Wrigley	1	1	1		1	
Not Voting	8	6	6		21	

Vice Presidential Balloting / 3rd Day of Convention (June 12, 1924)

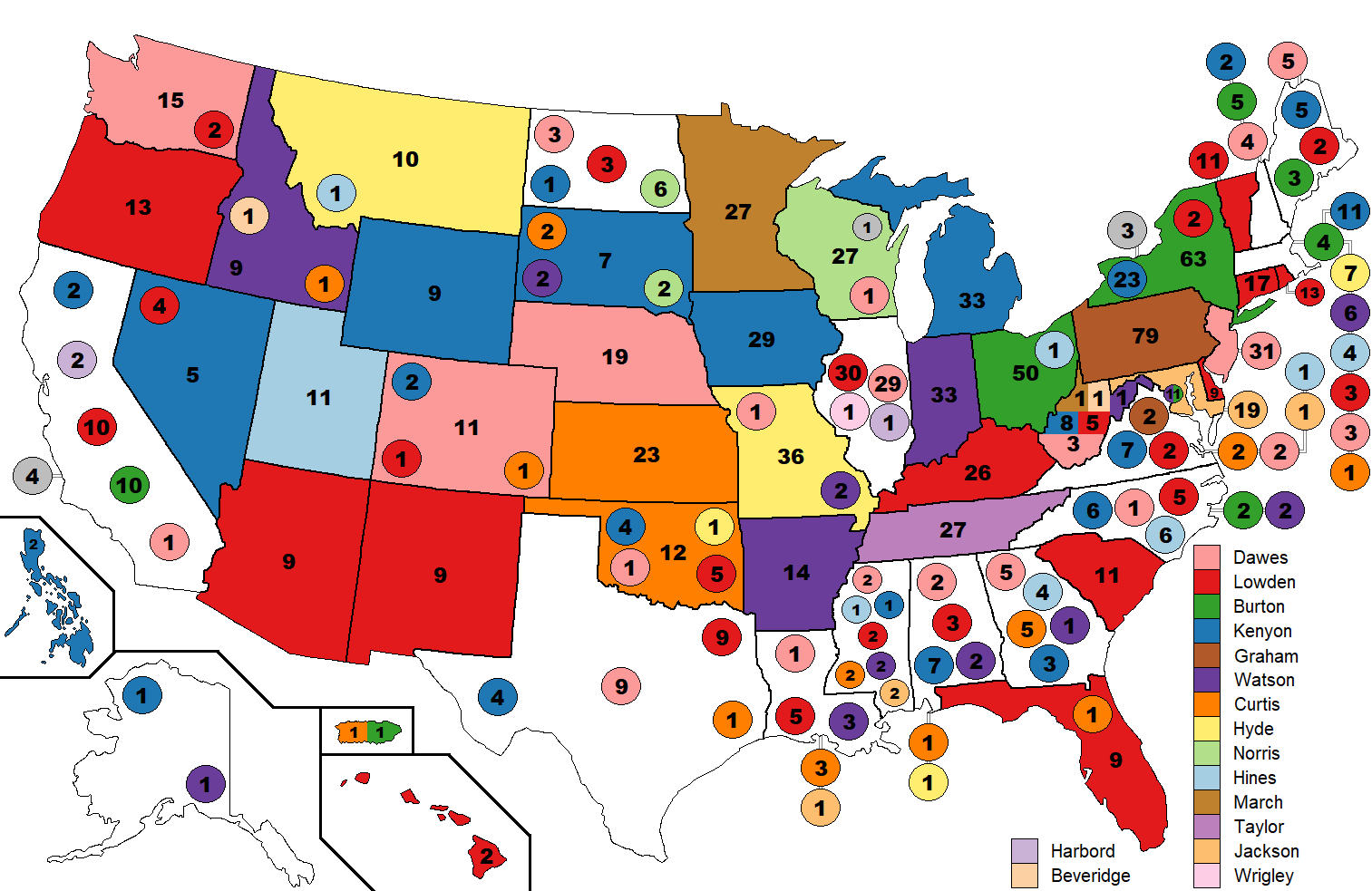
1st
Vice Presidential Ballot

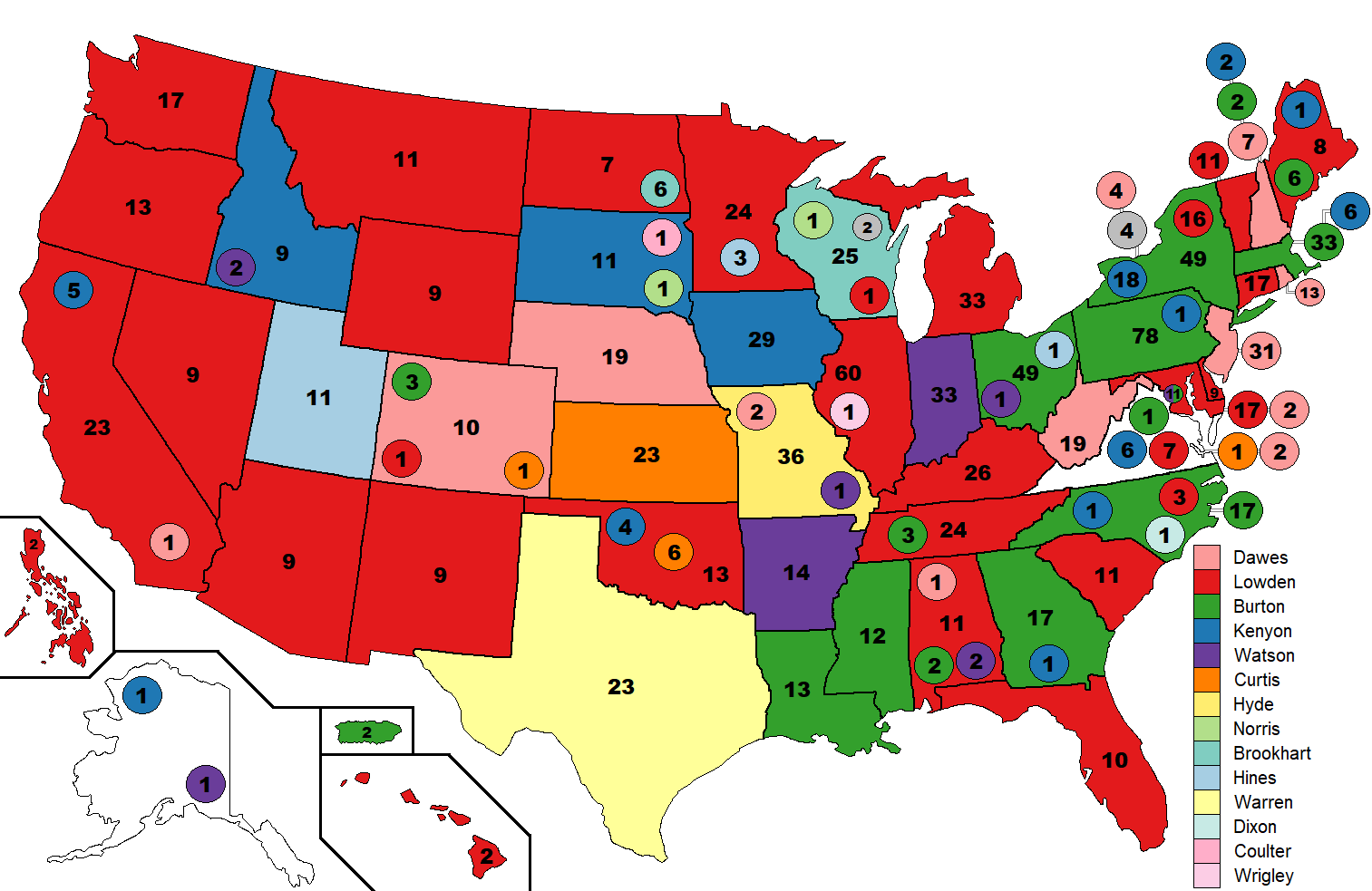
2nd
Vice Presidential Ballot
(Before Shifts)

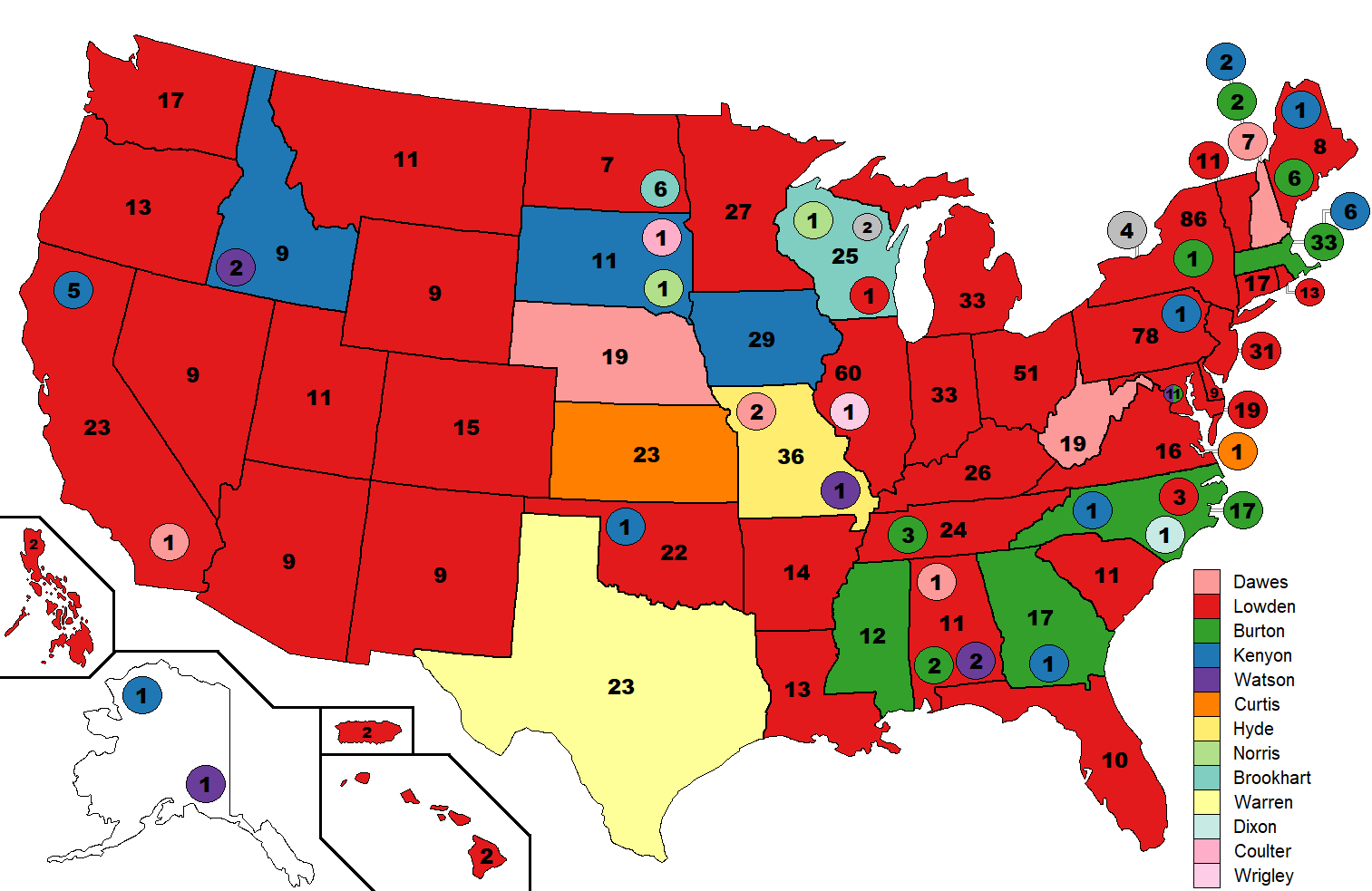
2nd
Vice Presidential Ballot
(After Shifts)

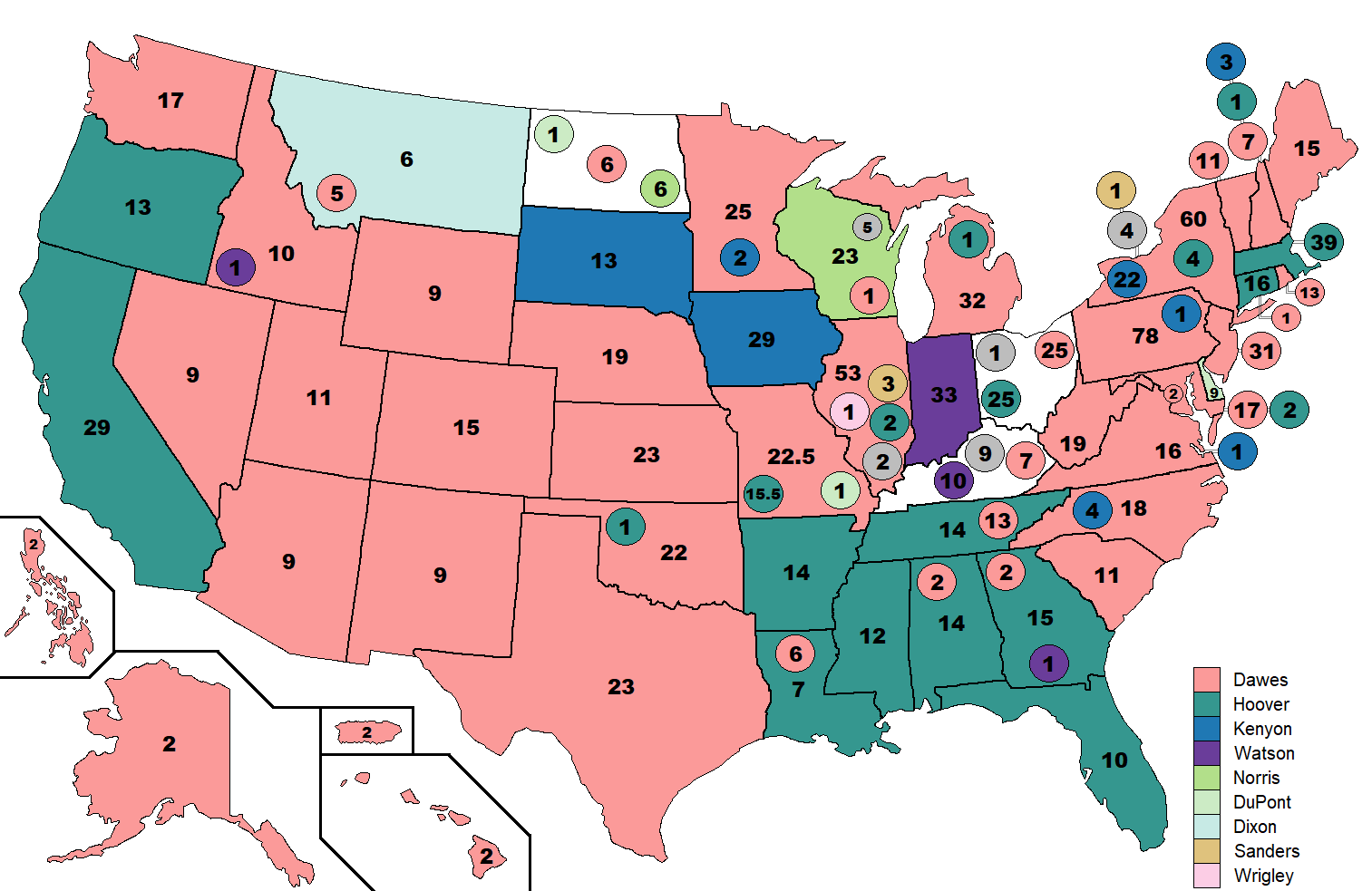
3rd
Vice Presidential Ballot

== Prayers ==
Each of the three days of the convention opened with a lengthy invocation by a different clergymen—one Methodist, one Jewish, one Catholic. Each was listed among the convention officers as an official chaplain.

On June 10, the opening prayer was given by William F. Anderson, Methodist Episcopal bishop of Boston. Among other things, he called for "stricter observance of the law and the preservation of the Constitution of the United States", in other words, for more zealous enforcement of Prohibition.

The next day's session was opened by Rev. Dr. Samuel Schulman, rabbi of Temple Beth-El in New York. Schulman spoke with appreciation for "the Republican Party's precious heritage of the championship of human rights"; he called for "every form of prejudice and misunderstanding" to be "driven forever out of our land". Speaking of Calvin Coolidge, he praised "the integrity, the wisdom, the fearlessness of our beloved President".

On June 12, the final day's invocation was given by Roman Catholic Bishop Joseph Schrembs of Cleveland. Schrembs characterized President Calvin Coolidge as "a chieftain whose record of faithful public service, and whose personality, untarnished and untainted by the pollution of political corruption, will fill the heart of America with the new hope of a second spring".

== See also ==
- History of the United States Republican Party
- List of Republican National Conventions
- United States presidential nominating convention
- 1924 Republican Party presidential primaries
- 1924 United States presidential election
- 1924 Democratic National Convention

== Notes ==
Preceded by 1920; Chicago, Illinois	Republican National Conventions	Succeeded by 1928; Kansas City, Missouri
