= NOAAS Researcher =

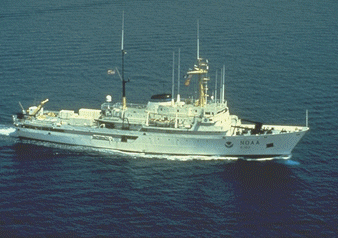

History

United States
- Name: USC&GS Researcher (OSS 03)
- Namesake: A researcher, a person who engages in diligent inquiry or examination to seek or revise facts, principles, theories, etc.
- Operator: United States Coast and Geodetic Survey
- Builder: American Shipbuilding Company, Toledo, Ohio
- Launched: October 1968
- Acquired: 18 June 1970
- Commissioned: Never
- Fate: Transferred to National Oceanic and Atmospheric Administration 3 October 1970

United States
- Name: NOAAS Researcher (R 103)
- Namesake: Previous name retained
- Operator: National Oceanic and Atmospheric Administration
- Acquired: Transferred from U.S. Coast and Geodetic Survey 3 October 1970
- Commissioned: October 1970
- Renamed: NOAAS Malcolm Baldrige (R 103) 1 March 1988
- Namesake: Malcolm Baldrige, Jr., (1922-1987), U.S. Secretary of Commerce 1981-1987
- Decommissioned: 23 August 1996
- Home port: Miami, Florida
- Identification: IMO number: 6901907; Call letters: WTER
- Fate: Sold late 1990s

Comoros
- Name: MV Ushuaia
- Namesake: Ushuaia, a city in Argentina
- Operator: Antarpply Expeditions
- Acquired: Late 1990s
- Home port: Ushuaia, Argentina
- Status: Extant

General characteristics (as NOAA ship in 1989)
- Type: Oceanographic research ship
- Tonnage: 2,802 gross register tons; 946 net register tons
- Displacement: 2,963 tons
- Length: 278.3 ft (84.8 m)
- Beam: 51 ft (16 m)
- Draft: 18.3 ft (5.6 m)
- Installed power: 2 x Detroit Diesel/Delco electric generators, 500 kW; 1 x Detroit Diesel/Delco emergency generator, 125 kW
- Propulsion: 2 x Alco geared diesel engines, 1,600 hp (1,193 kW) each; 2 x 10.5 ft (3.2 m) Bird-Johnson variable-pitch propellers
- Speed: 13 kn (24 km/h; 15 mph) (cruising)
- Range: 11,245 nmi (20,826 km; 12,941 mi)
- Endurance: 36 days
- Boats & landing craft carried: 1 x Hurricane Moddel 7500 24 ft (7.3 m) diesel-powered RHIB; 1 x 21 ft (6.4 m) aluminum open boat, gasoline outboard motor; 1 x Zodiac 13 ft (4.0 m) inflatable boat, gasoline outboard motor
- Complement: 10 NOAA Corps commissioned officers, 4 licensed officers, 46 other crew, up to 28 embarked scientists
- Aviation facilities: Portable helicopter platform

General characteristics (as cruise ship in 2014)
- Type: Cruise ship
- Tonnage: 2,923 gross register tons
- Length: 84.73 m (278.0 ft)
- Beam: 15.41 m (50.6 ft)
- Draft: 5.48 m (18.0 ft)
- Ice class: C
- Propulsion: 2 x Alco geared diesel engines, 1,600 hp (1,193 kW) each
- Speed: 12 kn (22 km/h; 14 mph) (cruising)
- Boats & landing craft carried: 7 x Zodiac inflatable boats
- Capacity: 88 passengers
- Crew: 38

NOAAS Researcher (R 103), was an American oceanographic research vessel in commission in the National Oceanic and Atmospheric Administration (NOAA) from 1970 to 1996. She had been delivered to the United States Coast and Geodetic Survey in 1970 as USC&GS Researcher (OSS 03), but did not enter commission until after her transfer to NOAA later that year. In 1988, Researcher was renamed NOAAS Malcolm Baldrige (R 103).

After her United States Government career came to an end, Malcolm Baldrige became the cruise ship MV Ushuaia, operating between Argentina and Antarctica.

== Construction and commissioning ==
Designed by the Maritime Administration, Researcher was built of welded steel with an ice-strengthened hull as an "ocean survey ship" (OSS) for the U.S. Coast and Geodetic Survey by the American Shipbuilding Company at Toledo, Ohio. Launched in October 1968, she was delivered in June 1970 to the Coast and Geodetic Survey at the Atlantic Maritime Center in Norfolk, Virginia, and accepted there on 18 June 1970 by the Survey, which planned to commission her as USC&GS Researcher (OSS 03). She had not yet been commissioned when the Coast and Geodetic Survey and other United States Government agencies merged to form NOAA on 3 October 1970. Researcher was commissioned that month and became a part of the new NOAA fleet as NOAAS Researcher (OSS 03). In the mid-1970s, her hull number was changed, and she became NOAAS Researcher (R 103).

== Operational career ==
=== U.S. Government ===
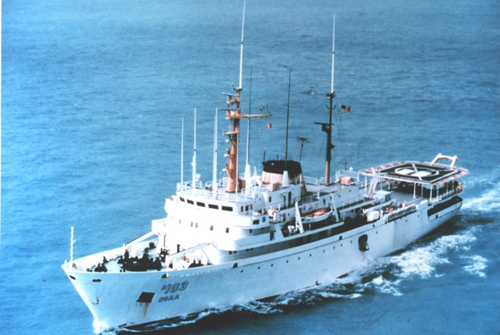

Researcher operated as an all-purpose oceanographic research ship in all the world's oceans, conducting oceanographic and atmospheric research.

In 1987, the long-serving United States Secretary of Commerce, Malcolm Baldrige, Jr., died in office of injuries suffered in a rodeo accident. In his honor, Researcher was renamed NOAAS Malcolm Baldrige (R 103) in a ceremony at Pier 1 at the Washington Navy Yard in Washington, D.C., on 1 March 1988. She was the first ship to be outfitted with an upgraded oceanographic system, the Scientific Computer System (SCS), which consisted of two MicroVAX computer systems that were networked to provide for both data acquisition and data processing functions. One of the MicroVAX systems was dedicated to acquiring, logging, and displaying data in real time and performing real-time data quality assurance functions, while the second MicroVAX was allocated to scientists embarked on the ship for data analysis and direction of their research.

Malcolm Baldrige was the second NOAA ship to circumnavigate the Earth, leaving Miami, Florida, in February 1995, proceeding through the South Atlantic Ocean, Indian Ocean, and Pacific Ocean, and then through the Panama Canal to Norfolk, Virginia, where the voyage ended in early 1996. NOAA decommissioned Malcolm Baldrige on 23 August 1996.

=== Cruise ship ===
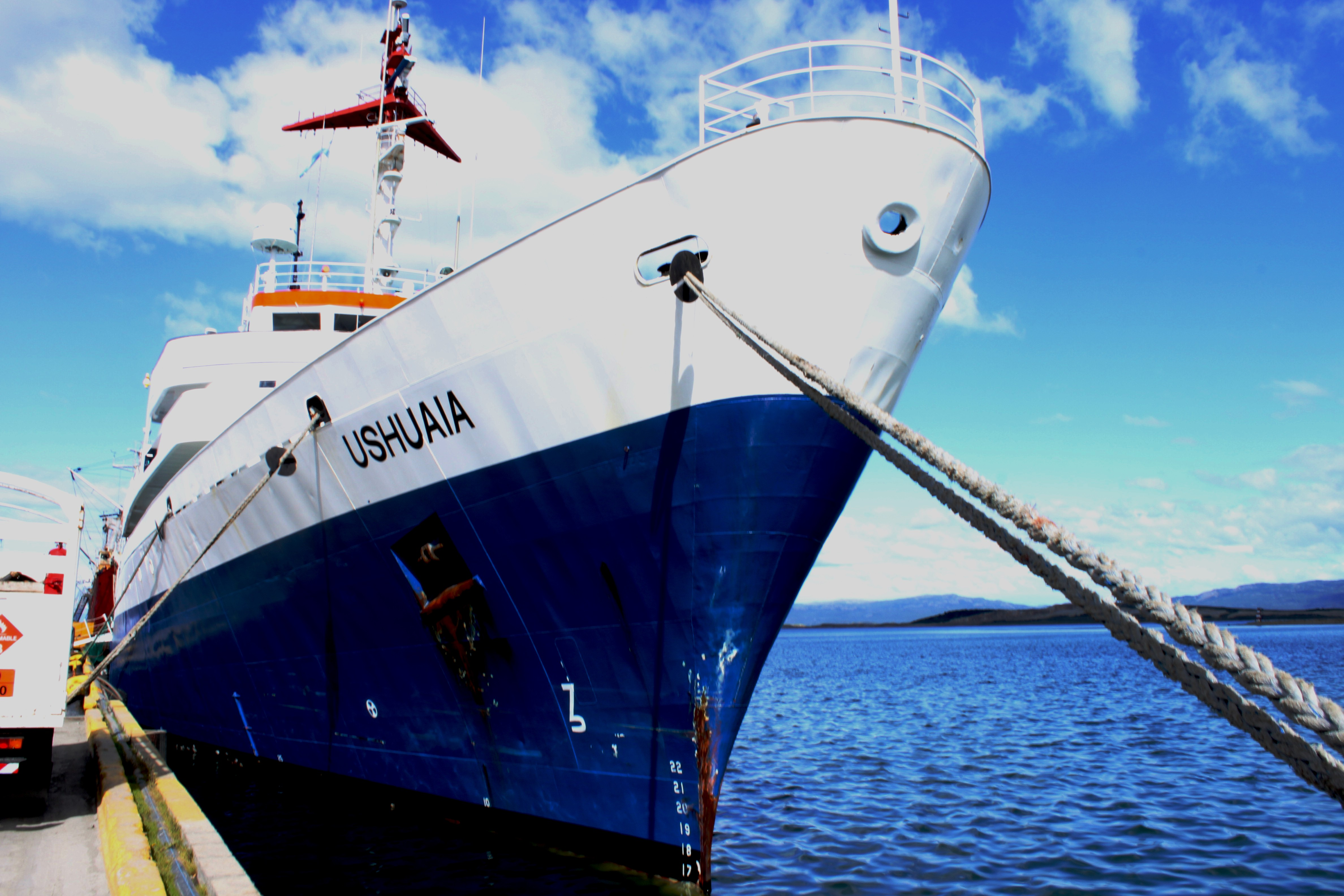
MV Ushuaia on 17 February 2011.

Sometime in the late 1990s, Malcolm Baldrige was sold to a firm in Argentina, Antarpply Expeditions, which converted her into a cruise ship to run tours to Antarctica. Renamed MV Ushuaia and registered in Togo, she is based in the city of Ushuaia on Tierra del Fuego in Argentina on the Beagle Channel near the southern tip of South America. Ushuaia could carry 84 passengers.

On 4 December 2008, Ushuaia hit a rock in Wilhelmina Bay off Antarctica. The Chilean Navy transport Aquiles took off her passengers — 14 Dutch, 12 Americans, 11 Australians, eight Germans, and six Chinese, as well as Canadians, New Zealanders, Britons, Italians, French, Spaniards, Swiss, a Belgian, and a Cypriot — and five Argentine crew members on 5 December 2008 and transported them to the Base Presidente Eduardo Frei Montalva in the South Shetland Islands, from which they were flown to Ushuaia on 6 December 2008 aboard the Argentine Air Force KC-130H Hercules tanker TC-69.

In 2014, Ushuaia underwent renovation and refurbishment, from which she emerged with a capacity of 88 passengers in 44 cabins and suites, a large dining room, a bar, an open-plan observation lounge equipped with multimedia equipment that allows it to double as a lecture room, a library, a changing room, and a small infirmary. She carries seven Zodiac inflatable boats.

== See also ==
- NOAA ships and aircraft
