= John Lee Coulter =

American economist

John Lee Coulter (April 16, 1881 – April 16, 1959) was an American academic. He assumed several roles within the federal government, and served as president of the North Dakota Agriculture College from 1921 to 1929.

Coulter was born in East Grand Forks, Minnesota, on April 16, 1881, and attended the University of North Dakota before earning his doctorate from the University of Wisconsin in 1908. He began teaching at the University of Minnesota later that year. Coulter started working for the federal government in 1910, leading the U. S. Census of Agriculture. He helped establish the system of banks and credit unions for rural use under the provisions of the Federal Farm Loan Act. Coulter was designated an inaugural fellow of the American Statistical Association in 1914, and returned to academia in 1915, as dean of the agricultural college at West Virginia University, and led the school's experimental station. When the United States joined World War I, Coulter was named a member of the War Industries Board. He was later appointed president of the North Dakota Agriculture College, serving from October 1921 to July 1929, when Herbert Hoover named Coulter the chief economist of the United States Tariff Commission. Coulter became the expert assistant to George Peek in July 1934.

He and Phoebe Frost married in Washington, D.C., in 1911. The couple had three sons. He died in Washington, D.C., on April 16, 1959, aged 78.
