= Malcolm Baldrige Jr. =

American businessman (1922–1987)

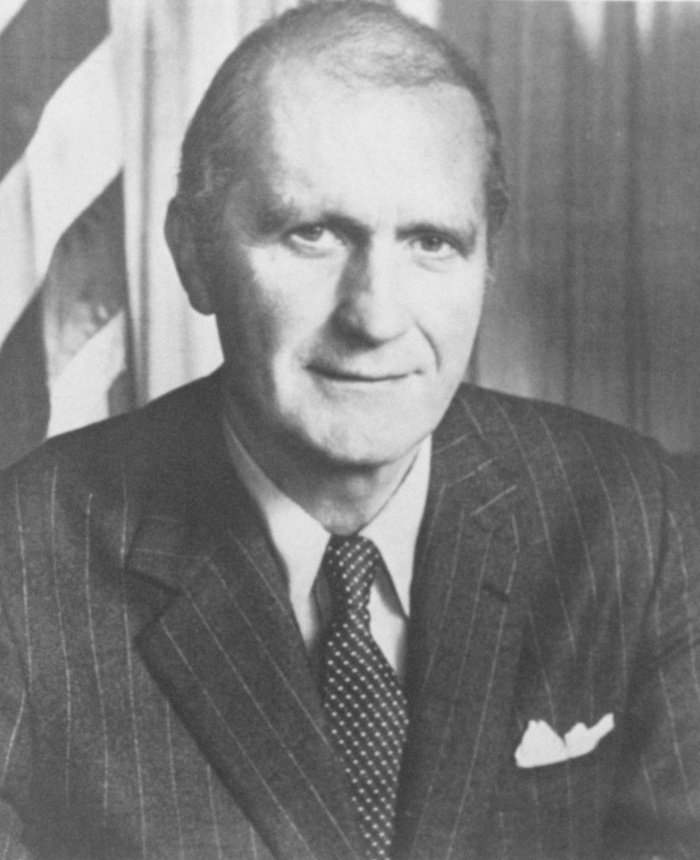

26th United States Secretary of Commerce
- In office January 20, 1981 – July 25, 1987
- President: Ronald Reagan
- Preceded by: Philip Klutznick
- Succeeded by: William Verity

Personal details
- Born: Howard Malcolm Baldrige Jr. October 4, 1922 Omaha, Nebraska, U.S.
- Died: July 25, 1987 (aged 64) Walnut Creek, California, U.S.
- Resting place: North Cemetery in Woodbury, Connecticut, U.S.
- Party: Republican
- Relations: Letitia Baldrige (sister)
- Parent: Howard Malcolm Baldrige, Sr. (father)
- Education: Yale University
- Occupation: Foundryman, Rodeo team roper, businessman
- Profession: Businessman

Military service
- Allegiance: United States
- Branch/service: United States Army
- Rank: Captain
- Battles/wars: World War II

Howard Malcolm "Mac" Baldrige Jr. (October 4, 1922 – July 25, 1987) was an American businessman. He served as the United States secretary of commerce from 1981 until he died in 1987. He was inducted into the ProRodeo Hall of Fame in 1988.

== Biography ==
=== Early life and career ===
Baldrige was born on October 4, 1922, in Omaha, Nebraska. He was the son of H. Malcolm Baldrige, Sr. (1894–1985), a congressman from Nebraska, and the former Regina Katherine Connell (1896–1967). He had a brother, Robert Connell Baldridge (he alone returned the second "d" to his last name, which had been dropped in previous generations), and a sister, Letitia Baldrige.

He attended The Hotchkiss School and Yale University. At Yale, he was a member of a Delta Kappa Epsilon.

Baldrige began his career in the manufacturing industry in 1947 as the foundry hand in an iron company in Connecticut and rose to the presidency of that company by 1960. During World War II, Baldrige served in combat in the Pacific as Captain in the 27th Infantry Division. On March 31, 1951, Baldrige married Margaret "Midge" Trowbridge Murray, with whom he had two daughters.

Before entering the Cabinet, Baldrige was chairman and chief executive officer of Waterbury, Connecticut-based brass company Scovill, Inc. Having joined Scovill in 1962, he is credited with leading its transformation to a highly diversified manufacturer of consumer, housing and industrial goods from a financially troubled brass mill.

=== Secretary of Commerce ===
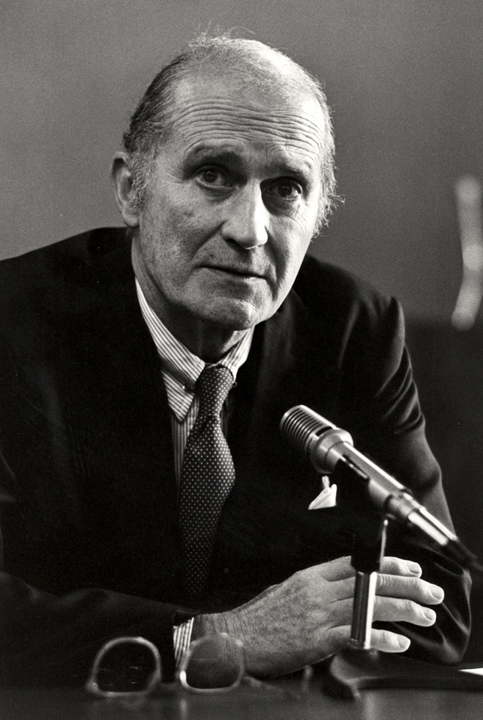
Malcolm Baldrige Jr.

Baldrige was nominated to be Secretary of Commerce by President-elect Ronald Reagan on December 11, 1980, and confirmed by the United States Senate on January 22, 1981. He served from January 20, 1981, until July 25, 1987. He and William C. Redfield served as commerce secretaries for six years. During his tenure, Baldrige played a significant role in developing and carrying out Administration trade policy. He took the lead in resolving difficulties in technology transfers with China and India. Baldrige held the first Cabinet-level talks with the Soviet Union in seven years, which paved the way for increased access for U.S. firms to the Soviet market. The world's most preeminent leaders highly regarded him.

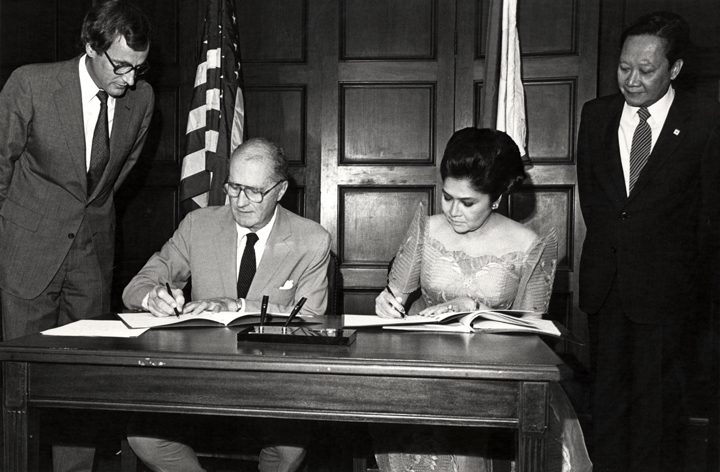
Baldrige with Imelda Marcos

Leading the Administration's ward effort to pass the Export Trading Company Act of 1982, Baldrige was named by the President to chair a Cabinet-level Trade Strike Force to search out unfair trading practices and recommend ways to end those practices. He was the leader in the reform of the nation's antitrust laws.

Baldrige's award-winning managerial excellence contributed to long-term economic improvement, efficiency, and effectiveness in government. Baldrige reduced the budget within the Commerce Department by more than 30% and administrative personnel by 25%.

"How Plain English Works for Business, Twelve Case Studies" was published by the U.S. Department of Commerce with his introduction in 1984. In it were twelve chapters on how "translations" of complex legal wording or bureaucratic jargon could be simplified and made more clear to any reader. In the section on insurance policy language, an example showed the cumbersome nature of "While this policy has a loan value, the owner may obtain an advance from XYZ Company upon assignment of the policy as sole security." It became "You can get a loan from us on your policy while it has a loan value. The policy can be the sole security for the loan."

Baldrige's introduction read, in part, "Talking or writing in plain English is a challenge to both the private and public sectors. In this book of case studies, 12 corporations and trade associations tell how they met this challenge. I am grateful for the efforts their officials have given to this partnership project."

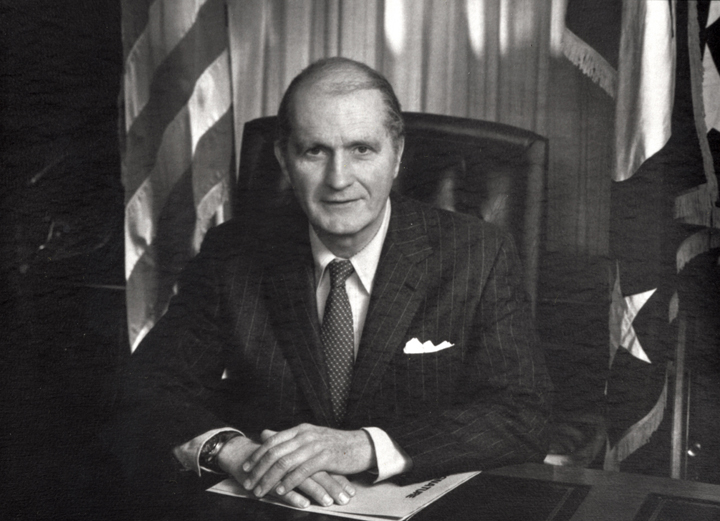
Malcolm Baldrige Jr.

Baldrige worked as a ranch hand during his boyhood and earned several awards as a professional team roper on the rodeo circuit. He was the Professional Rodeo Cowboys Association's Rodeo Man of the Year in 1981; he was installed in the Hall of Great Westerners of the National Cowboy and Western Heritage Museum in Oklahoma City, Oklahoma, in 1984. Baldrige once appeared on the television game show To Tell the Truth pretending to be rodeo tie-down roping champion Dean Oliver. He was inducted into the ProRodeo Hall of Fame in Colorado Springs, Colorado, in 1988, rodeo's highest honor.

=== Death and legacy ===
Secretary of Commerce Baldrige died in Northern California on July 25, 1987, after sustaining internal injuries from a rodeo accident while participating in a calf-roping competition when the horse he was riding fell on him at the Jack Roddy Ranch in Brentwood in east Contra Costa County, 45 miles (70 km) east of San Francisco. Following the accident, Baldrige was flown by helicopter to John Muir Hospital in Walnut Creek, California, but his internal injuries were too severe. Baldrige was buried in North Cemetery in Woodbury, Connecticut.

His service as Secretary of Commerce was one of the longest in history. He and Ron Brown are the only two who died while in office. Baldrige is said to have been possibly the most colorful Secretary of Commerce and one of the most beloved.

Baldrige was a proponent of quality management as a key to his country's prosperity and long-term strength. He took a personal interest in the legislation that became the Quality Improvement Act of 1987 and helped draft one of the early versions. In recognition of his contributions, Congress named the annual award (see Malcolm Baldrige National Quality Award) for product quality in his honor.

After Baldrige's death, the National Oceanic and Atmospheric Administration renamed the oceanographic research ship NOAAS Researcher (R 103) in his honor in a ceremony on March 1, 1988, at the Washington Navy Yard in Washington, D.C., the ship becoming NOAAS Malcolm Baldrige (R 103).

On October 17, 1988, Baldrige was presented posthumously with the Presidential Medal of Freedom by President Ronald Reagan.

== Awards and honors ==
- 1969 – Golden Plate Award of the American Academy of Achievement
- 1981 – Professional Rodeo Cowboys Association's Rodeo Man of the Year
- 1984 – Hall of Great Westerners of the National Cowboy and Western Heritage Museum in Oklahoma City, Oklahoma
- 1987 – Malcolm Baldrige National Quality Award and Program named in his honor by Congress in recognition of his contributions
- 1988 – ProRodeo Hall of Fame
- 1988 – NOAAS Researcher (R 103) renamed in his honor to the NOAAS Malcolm Baldrige (R 103)
- 1988 – Presidential Medal of Freedom

Political offices
Preceded by Philip Klutznick	U.S. Secretary of Commerce; Served under: Ronald Reagan; January 20, 1981 – July 25, 1987	Succeeded by William Verity
