= 1970 United States Senate elections =

- November 3, 1970
- Class 1

35 (Note: 33 Class 1 seats, as well as 1 Class 2 seat and 1 Class 3 seat in the special election.) of the 100 seats in the United States Senate 51 seats needed for a majority
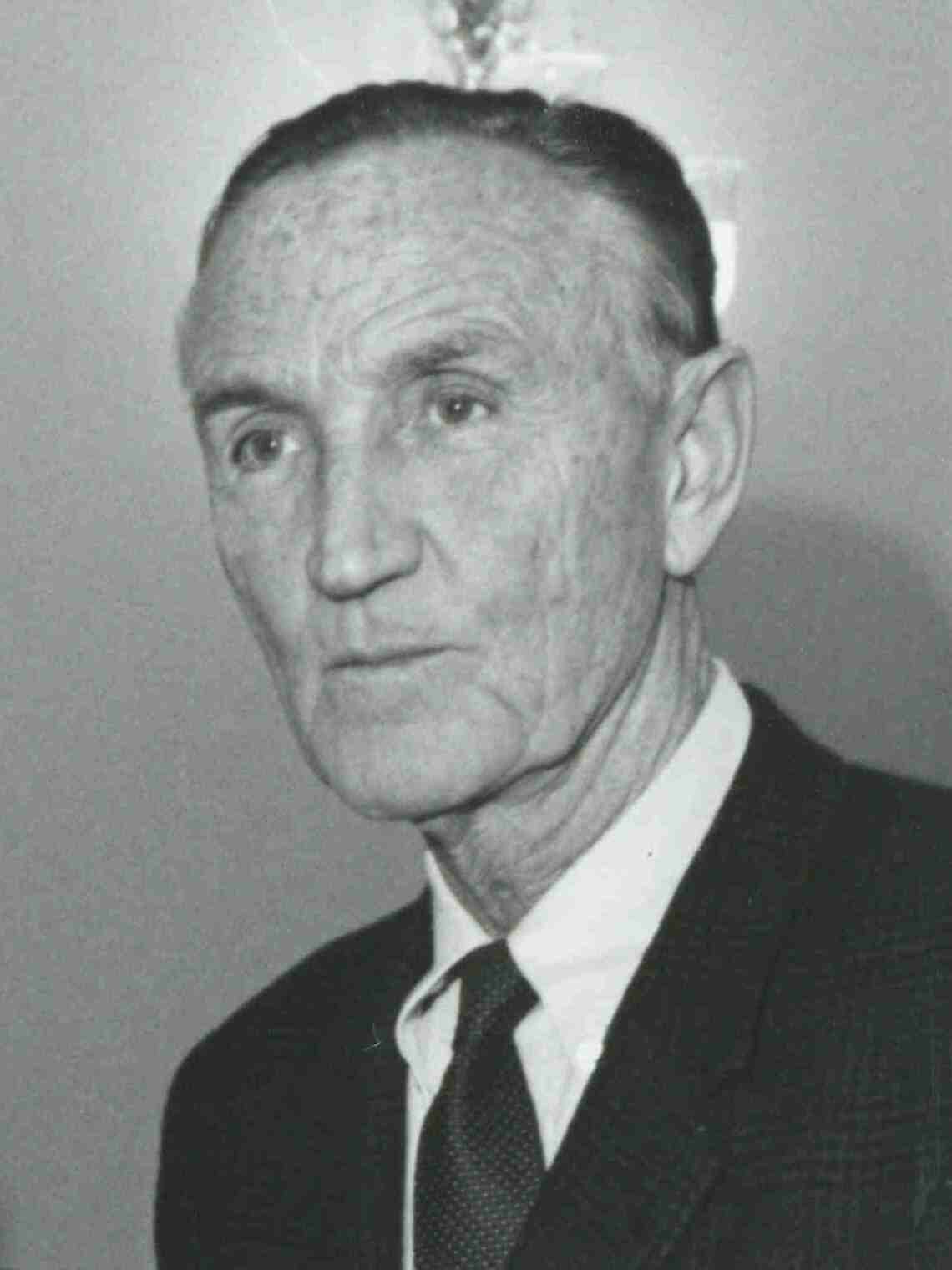

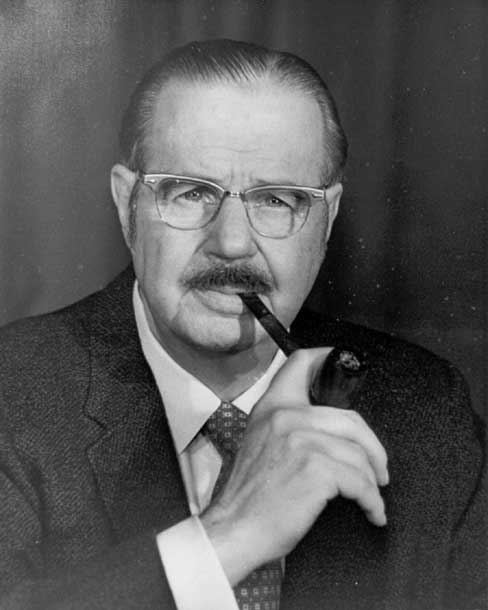
	Majority party	Minority party
Leader	Mike Mansfield	Hugh Scott
Party	Democratic	Republican
Leader since	January 3, 1961	September 24, 1969
Leader's seat	Montana	Pennsylvania
Seats before	57	43
Seats after	54	44
Seat change	▼3	▲1
Popular vote	25,435,247	19,373,972 (Note: The Liberal Party in New York nominated Charles Goodell, a Republican, but the Clerk of the U.S. House of Representatives did not tabulate their votes, totaling 225,793, into the national Republican total.)
Percentage	52.4%	39.9%
Seats up	24	10
Races won	22	11
	Third party	Fourth party
Party	Conservative	Independent
Seats before	0	0
Seats after	1	1
Seat change	▲1	▲1
Popular vote	2,183,572	516,149
Percentage	4.5%	1.1%
Seats up	0	1
Races won	1	1
- Results of the elections: Democratic gain Democratic hold Republican gain Republican hold Independent gain Conservative gain No election
Majority Leader before election
Mike Mansfield
Democratic
Elected Majority Leader
Mike Mansfield
Democratic

The 1970 United States Senate elections was an election for the United States Senate. It took place on November 3, with the 33 seats of Class 1 contested in regular elections. Special elections were also held to fill vacancies. These races occurred in the middle of Richard Nixon's first term as president. The Democrats lost a net of three seats, while the Republicans and the Conservative Party of New York picked up one net seat each, and former Democrat Harry F. Byrd Jr. was re-elected as an independent.

This was the first time that Republicans gained Senate seats while losing House seats, which also occurred in 2018. This also occurred for Democrats in 1914, 1962, and 2022.

This was the most recent election in which a third party won a seat in the Senate until 2006. As of 2026, this is also the most recent cycle in which Democrats won Senate elections in Utah and Wyoming, and the most recent in which Republicans won a Senate election in Hawaii.

Since the deaths of Lowell Weicker and James L. Buckley in 2023, this is the latest Senate election cycle where all first-elected members are deceased.

== Results summary ==
↓
54	1	1	44
Democratic	I	C	Republican

Parties						Total
Parties	Democratic	Republican	Conservative	Independent	Other	Total
Last elections (1968)	58	42	0	0	0	100
Before these elections	57	43	0	0	0	100
Not up	32	33	—	0	—	65
Up	25	10	—	—	—	35
Class 1 (1964→1970)	25	8	—	—	—	33
Special: Class 2	0	1	—	0	—	1
Special: Class 3	0	1	—	0	—	1
Incumbent retired	3	1	—	0	—	4
Held by same party	2	1	—	—	—	3
Replaced by other party	▼1 Democrat replaced by ▲1 Republican		—	—	—	1
Result	2	2	0	0	0	4
Incumbent ran	22 (Note: In Texas, Ralph Yarborough lost renomination for another term, Lloyd Bentsen became the party's new nominee.) (Note: Includes three interim appointees who ran for election.)	9	—	—	—	31
Won re-election	17	6 (Note: Includes the interim appointee who won election to finish the term.)	—	—	—	23
Won re-election but changed party	▼1 Democrat re-elected as an ▲ Independent				—	1
Lost re-election	▼2 Republicans replaced by ▲2 Democrats ▼3 Democrats replaced by ▲3 Republicans ▼1 Republican replaced by ▲1 Conservative			—	—	6
Lost renomination, but held by same party	1	0	—	—	—	1
Result	20	9	1	1	0	31
Total elected	22	11	1	1	0	35
Net gain/loss	▼3	▲1	▲1	▲1	Steady	2
Nationwide vote	25,435,247	19,373,972	2,183,572	516,149	1,049,884	48,558,824
Share	52.38%	39.90%	4.50%	1.06%	2.16%	100%
Result	54	44	1	1	0	100

Source: Office of the Clerk

== Getting out the vote ==
President Nixon said that rather than violent protests, the best way for the American public to get their opinion heard was by voting:

The most powerful four letter word is a clean word, it's the most powerful four letter word in the history of men, it's called vote. V-O-T-E. My friends, I say that the answer to those that engage in disruption, to those that shout their filthy slogans, to those that try to shout down speakers, it's not to answer in kind, but go to the polls in election day, and in the quiet of that ballot box, stand up and be counted, the great silent majority of America.

— Richard Nixon, 1970 Election: 1970 Year in Review

== Gains, losses, and holds ==
=== Retirements ===
One Republican and three Democrats retired instead of seeking re-election.

State	Senator	Replaced by
Delaware	John J. Williams	William Roth
Florida	Spessard Holland	Lawton Chiles
Minnesota	Eugene McCarthy	Hubert Humphrey
Ohio	Stephen M. Young	Robert Taft Jr.

=== Defeats ===
One Republican and four Democrats sought re-election but lost in the primary or general election. One Republican sought election to finish the unexpired term but lost in the special election and one Republican sought election to a full term but lost in the general election.

State	Senator	Replaced by
California	George Murphy	John V. Tunney
Connecticut	Thomas J. Dodd	Lowell Weicker
Illinois	Ralph Tyler Smith	Adlai Stevenson III
Maryland	Joseph Tydings	J. Glenn Beall Jr.
New York	Charles Goodell	James L. Buckley
Tennessee	Albert Gore Sr.	Bill Brock
Texas	Ralph Yarborough	Lloyd Bentsen

=== Independent gain ===
One Democrat ran as an independent in the general election.

State	Senator	Replaced by
Virginia	Harry F. Byrd Jr.	Harry F. Byrd Jr.

=== Post-election changes ===
State	Senator	Replaced by
Georgia	Richard Russell Jr.	David H. Gambrell
Louisiana	Allen J. Ellender	Elaine Edwards
Vermont	Winston L. Prouty	Robert Stafford

== Change in composition ==
=== Before the elections ===
D_{1}	D_{2}	D_{3}	D_{4}	D_{5}	D_{6}	D_{7}	D_{8}	D_{9}	D_{10}
D_{20}	D_{19}	D_{18}	D_{17}	D_{16}	D_{15}	D_{14}	D_{13}	D_{12}	D_{11}
D_{21}	D_{22}	D_{23}	D_{24}	D_{25}	D_{26}	D_{27}	D_{28}	D_{29}	D_{30}
D_{40} Minn. Retired	D_{39} Mich. Ran	D_{38} Mass. Ran	D_{37} Md. Ran	D_{36} Maine; Ran	D_{35} Ind. Ran	D_{34} Fla. Retired	D_{33} Conn. Ran	D_{32}	D_{31}
D_{41} Miss. Ran	D_{42} Mo. Ran	D_{43} Mont. Ran	D_{44} Nev. Ran	D_{45} N.J. Ran	D_{46} N.M. Ran	D_{47} N.D. Ran	D_{48} Ohio; Ran	D_{49} R.I. Ran	D_{50} Tenn. Ran
Majority →									D_{51} Texas; Ran
R_{41} N.Y. Ran	R_{42} Pa. Ran	R_{43} Vt. Ran	D_{51} Va. Ran	D_{56} Wyo. Ran	D_{55} Wis. Retired	D_{54} W.Va. Ran	D_{53} Wash. Ran	D_{52} Utah; Ran	D_{51} Texas; Ran
R_{40} Neb. Ran	R_{39} Ill. (sp); Ran	R_{38} Hawaii; Ran	R_{37} Del. Retired	R_{36} Calif. Ran	R_{35} Ariz. Ran	R_{34} Alaska (sp); Ran	R_{33}	R_{32}	R_{31}
R_{21}	R_{22}	R_{23}	R_{24}	R_{25}	R_{26}	R_{27}	R_{28}	R_{29}	R_{30}
R_{20}	R_{19}	R_{18}	R_{17}	R_{16}	R_{15}	R_{14}	R_{13}	R_{12}	R_{11}
R_{1}	R_{2}	R_{3}	R_{4}	R_{5}	R_{6}	R_{7}	R_{8}	R_{9}	R_{10}

=== After the elections ===
D_{1}	D_{2}	D_{3}	D_{4}	D_{5}	D_{6}	D_{7}	D_{8}	D_{9}	D_{10}
D_{20}	D_{19}	D_{18}	D_{17}	D_{16}	D_{15}	D_{14}	D_{13}	D_{12}	D_{11}
D_{21}	D_{22}	D_{23}	D_{24}	D_{25}	D_{26}	D_{27}	D_{28}	D_{29}	D_{30}
D_{40} Mo. Re-elected	D_{39} Miss. Re-elected	D_{38} Minn. Hold	D_{37} Mich. Re-elected	D_{36} Mass. Re-elected	D_{35} Maine; Re-elected	D_{34} Ind. Re-elected	D_{33} Fla. Hold	D_{32}	D_{31}
D_{41} Mont. Re-elected	D_{42} Nev. Re-elected	D_{43} N.J. Re-elected	D_{44} N.M. Re-elected	D_{45} N.D. Re-elected	D_{46} R.I. Re-elected	D_{47} Texas; Hold	D_{48} Utah; Re-elected	D_{49} Wash. Re-elected	D_{50} W.Va. Re-elected
Majority →									D_{51} Wis. Re-elected
R_{41} Conn. Gain	R_{42} Md. Gain	R_{43} Ohio; Gain	R_{44} Tenn. Gain	C_{1} N.Y. Gain (Note: Appointee defeated)	I_{1} Va. Re-elected/Gain	D_{54} Ill. (sp); Gain	D_{53} Calif. Gain	D_{52} Wyo. Re-elected	D_{51} Wis. Re-elected
R_{40} Vt. Re-elected	R_{39} Pa. Re-elected	R_{38} Neb. Re-elected	R_{37} Hawaii; Re-elected	R_{36} Del. Hold	R_{35} Ariz. Re-elected	R_{34} Alaska (sp); Elected (Note: Appointee elected)	R_{33}	R_{32}	R_{31}
R_{21}	R_{22}	R_{23}	R_{24}	R_{25}	R_{26}	R_{27}	R_{28}	R_{29}	R_{30}
R_{20}	R_{19}	R_{18}	R_{17}	R_{16}	R_{15}	R_{14}	R_{13}	R_{12}	R_{11}
R_{1}	R_{2}	R_{3}	R_{4}	R_{5}	R_{6}	R_{7}	R_{8}	R_{9}	R_{10}

Key:

C_{#}	Conservative (New York)
D_{#}	Democratic
R_{#}	Republican
I_{#}	Independent

== Race summary ==
=== Special elections during the 91st Congress ===
In these special elections, the winner was seated during 1970 or before January 3, 1971; ordered by election date, then state.

State	Incumbent			Results	Candidates
State	Senator	Party	Electoral history	Results	Candidates
Alaska (Class 2)	Ted Stevens	Republican	1968 (Appointed)	Interim appointee elected.	▌ ✓ Ted Stevens (Republican) 59.6%; ▌Wendell P. Kay (Democratic) 40.4%
Illinois (Class 3)	Ralph Tyler Smith	Republican	1969 (Appointed)	Interim appointee lost election. Democratic gain.	▌ ✓ Adlai Stevenson III (Democratic) 57.4%; ▌Ralph Tyler Smith (Republican) 42.2%

=== Elections leading to the next Congress ===
In these general elections, the winners were elected for the term beginning January 3, 1971; ordered by state.

All of the elections involved the Class 1 seats.

State	Incumbent			Results	Candidates
State	Senator	Party	Electoral history	Results	Candidates
Arizona	Paul Fannin	Republican	1964	Incumbent re-elected.	▌ ✓ Paul Fannin (Republican) 56.0%; ▌Sam Grossman (Democratic) 44.0%
California	George Murphy	Republican	1964; 1964 (Appointed)	Incumbent lost re-election. Democratic gain. Incumbent resigned January 1, 1971 to give successor preferential seniority. Winner appointed January 2, 1971.	▌ ✓ John V. Tunney (Democratic) 53.9%; ▌George Murphy (Republican) 44.3%; ▌Robert Scheer (Peace and Freedom) 0.9%; ▌Charles C. Ripley (American Independent) 0.9%
Connecticut	Thomas J. Dodd	Democratic	1958; 1964	Incumbent lost renomination, then ran as an Independent candidate but lost re-election. Republican gain.	▌ ✓ Lowell Weicker (Republican) 41.7%; ▌Joseph Duffey (Democratic) 33.8%; ▌Thomas J. Dodd (Independent) 24.5%
Delaware	John J. Williams	Republican	1946; 1952; 1958; 1964	Incumbent retired. Republican hold. Incumbent resigned December 31, 1970 to give successor preferential seniority. Winner appointed January 1, 1971.	▌ ✓ William Roth (Republican) 58.8%; ▌Jacob Zimmerman (Democratic) 40.1%
Florida	Spessard Holland	Democratic	1946 (Appointed); 1946; 1952; 1958; 1964	Incumbent retired. Democratic hold.	▌ ✓ Lawton Chiles (Democratic) 53.9%; ▌William C. Cramer (Republican) 46.1%
Hawaii	Hiram Fong	Republican	1959; 1964	Incumbent re-elected.	▌ ✓ Hiram Fong (Republican) 51.6%; ▌Cecil Heftel (Democratic) 48.4%
Indiana	Vance Hartke	Democratic	1958; 1964	Incumbent re-elected.	▌ ✓ Vance Hartke (Democratic) 50.1%; ▌Richard L. Roudebush (Republican) 49.9%
Maine	Edmund Muskie	Democratic	1958; 1964	Incumbent re-elected.	▌ ✓ Edmund Muskie (Democratic) 61.9%; ▌Neil S. Bishop (Republican) 38.3%
Maryland	Joseph Tydings	Democratic	1964	Incumbent lost re-election. Republican gain.	▌ ✓ J. Glenn Beall Jr. (Republican) 50.7%; ▌Joseph Tydings (Democratic) 48.1%
Massachusetts	Ted Kennedy	Democratic	1962 (special); 1964	Incumbent re-elected.	▌ ✓ Ted Kennedy (Democratic) 62.1%; ▌Josiah Spaulding (Republican) 37.0%
Michigan	Philip Hart	Democratic	1958; 1964	Incumbent re-elected.	▌ ✓ Philip Hart (Democratic) 66.8%; ▌Lenore Romney (Republican) 32.9%
Minnesota	Eugene McCarthy	DFL	1958; 1964	Incumbent retired. DFL hold.	▌ ✓ Hubert Humphrey (DFL) 57.8%; ▌Clark MacGregor (Republican) 41.6%
Mississippi	John C. Stennis	Democratic	1947 (special); 1952; 1958; 1964	Incumbent re-elected.	▌ ✓ John C. Stennis (Democratic) 88.4%; ▌William R. Thompson (Independent) 11.6%
Missouri	Stuart Symington	Democratic	1952; 1958; 1964	Incumbent re-elected.	▌ ✓ Stuart Symington (Democratic) 51.1%; ▌John Danforth (Republican) 48.1%; Others: ▌Gene Chapman (American Independent) 0.8%; ▌E. J. DiGirolamo (Independent) 0.04%
Montana	Mike Mansfield	Democratic	1952; 1958; 1964	Incumbent re-elected.	▌ ✓ Mike Mansfield (Democratic) 60.5%; ▌Harold E. Wallace (Republican) 39.5%
Nebraska	Roman Hruska	Republican	1954 (special); 1958; 1964	Incumbent re-elected.	▌ ✓ Roman Hruska (Republican) 52.5%; ▌Frank B. Morrison (Democratic) 47.5%
Nevada	Howard Cannon	Democratic	1958; 1964	Incumbent re-elected.	▌ ✓ Howard Cannon (Democratic) 57.7%; ▌William Raggio (Republican) 41.2%
New Jersey	Harrison A. Williams	Democratic	1958; 1964	Incumbent re-elected.	▌ ✓ Harrison A. Williams (Democratic) 54.0%; ▌Nelson G. Gross (Republican) 42.2%
New Mexico	Joseph Montoya	Democratic	1964 (special); 1964	Incumbent re-elected.	▌ ✓ Joseph Montoya (Democratic) 52.3%; ▌Anderson Carter (Republican) 46.6%
New York	Charles Goodell	Republican	1968 (Appointed)	Interim appointee lost election. Conservative gain.	▌ ✓ James L. Buckley (Conservative) 38.8%; ▌Richard Ottinger (Democratic) 36.8%; ▌Charles Goodell (Republican) 24.3%
North Dakota	Quentin Burdick	Democratic-NPL	1960 (special); 1964	Incumbent re-elected.	▌ ✓ Quentin Burdick (Democratic-NPL) 61.3%; ▌Thomas S. Kleppe (Republican) 37.8%
Ohio	Stephen M. Young	Democratic	1958; 1964	Incumbent retired. Republican gain.	▌ ✓ Robert Taft Jr. (Republican) 49.7%; ▌Howard Metzenbaum (Democratic) 47.5%
Pennsylvania	Hugh Scott	Republican	1958; 1964	Incumbent re-elected.	▌ ✓ Hugh Scott (Republican) 51.4%; ▌William Sesler (Democratic) 45.4%
Rhode Island	John Pastore	Democratic	1950 (special); 1952; 1958; 1964	Incumbent re-elected.	▌ ✓ John Pastore (Democratic) 67.5%; ▌John McLaughlin (Republican) 31.5%
Tennessee	Albert Gore Sr.	Democratic	1952; 1958; 1964	Incumbent lost re-election. Republican gain.	▌ ✓ Bill Brock (Republican) 51.3%; ▌Albert Gore Sr. (Democratic) 47.4%
Texas	Ralph Yarborough	Democratic	1957 (special); 1958; 1964	Incumbent lost renomination. Democratic hold.	▌ ✓ Lloyd Bentsen (Democratic) 53.5%; ▌George H. W. Bush (Republican) 46.4%
Utah	Frank Moss	Democratic	1958; 1964	Incumbent re-elected.	▌ ✓ Frank Moss (Democratic) 56.2%; ▌Laurence J. Burton (Republican) 42.5%; ▌Clyde B. Freeman (American Independent) 1.4%
Vermont	Winston L. Prouty	Republican	1958; 1964	Incumbent re-elected.	▌ ✓ Winston L. Prouty (Republican) 58.9%; ▌Philip H. Hoff (Democratic) 40.2%
Virginia	Harry F. Byrd Jr.	Democratic	1965 (Appointed); 1966 (special)	Incumbent ran as an Independent and re-elected. Independent gain.	▌ ✓ Harry F. Byrd Jr. (Independent) 53.5%; ▌George Rawlings (Democratic) 31.2%; ▌Ray Garland (Republican) 15.3%
Washington	Henry M. Jackson	Democratic	1952; 1958; 1964	Incumbent re-elected.	▌ ✓ Henry M. Jackson (Democratic) 82.4%; ▌Charles W. Elicker (Republican) 16.0%; Others: ▌Bill Massey (Socialist Workers) 0.9%; ▌E.S. "Pinky" Fisk (Buffalo) 0.7%
West Virginia	Robert Byrd	Democratic	1958; 1964	Incumbent re-elected.	▌ ✓ Robert Byrd (Democratic) 77.6%; ▌Elmer H. Dodson (Republican) 22.4%
Wisconsin	William Proxmire	Democratic	1957 (special); 1958; 1964	Incumbent re-elected.	▌ ✓ William Proxmire (Democratic) 70.8%; ▌John E. Erickson (Republican) 28.5%
Wyoming	Gale W. McGee	Democratic	1958; 1964	Incumbent re-elected.	▌ ✓ Gale W. McGee (Democratic) 55.8%; ▌John S. Wold (Republican) 44.2%

== Closest races ==
Fourteen races had a margin of victory under 10%:

State	Party of winner	Margin
Indiana	Democratic	0.2%
New York	Conservative (flip)	2.0%
Ohio	Republican (flip)	2.2%
Maryland	Republican (flip)	2.6%
Missouri	Democratic	3.0%
Hawaii	Republican	3.2%
Tennessee	Republican (flip)	3.9%
Nebraska	Republican	5.0%
New Mexico	Democratic	5.7%
Pennsylvania	Republican	6.0%
Texas	Democratic	7.1%
Florida	Democratic	7.8% (Note: Florida was the "tipping-point state".)
Connecticut	Republican (flip)	7.9%
California	Democratic (flip)	9.6%

== Alaska (special) ==
Alaska special election
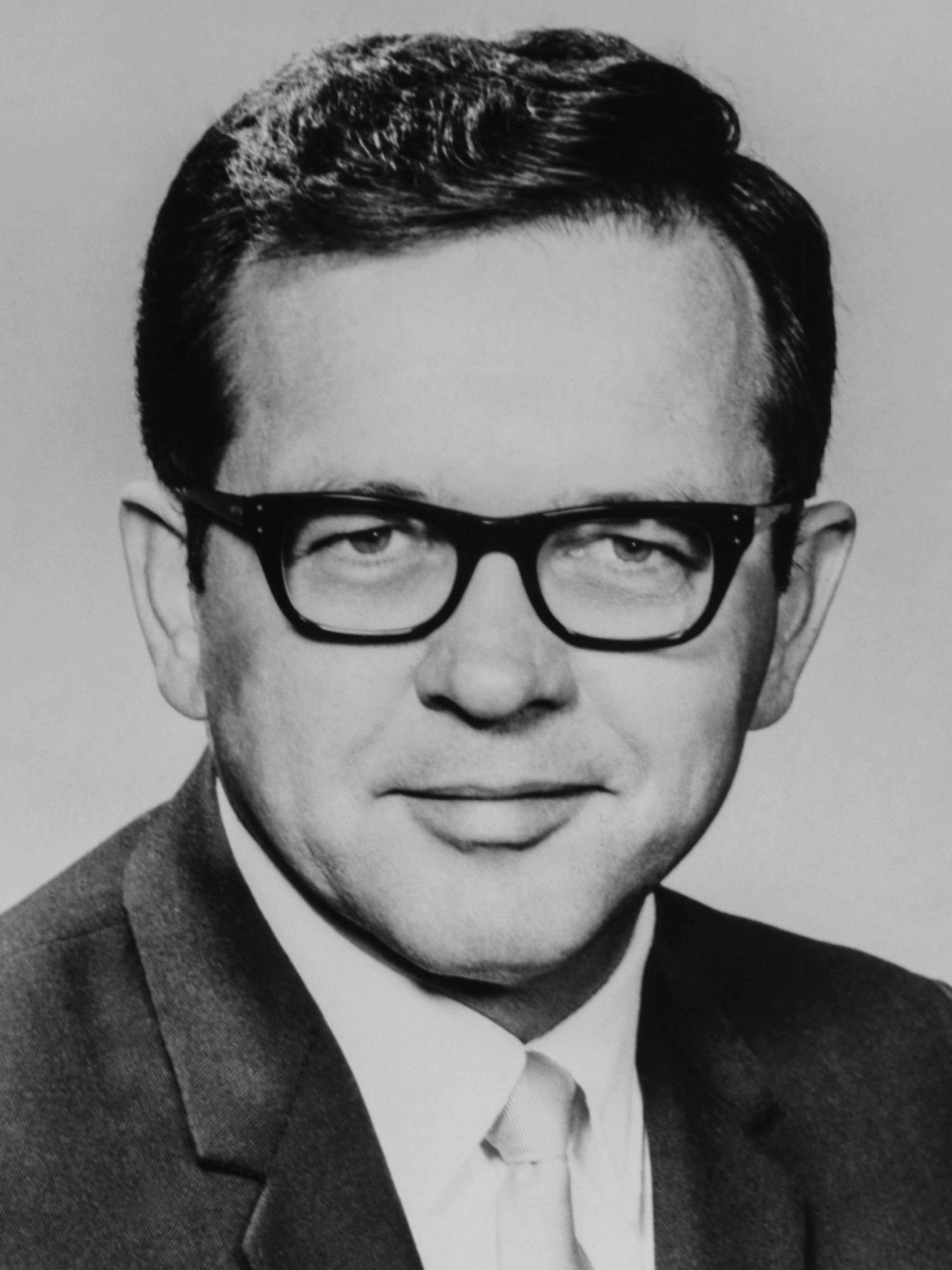

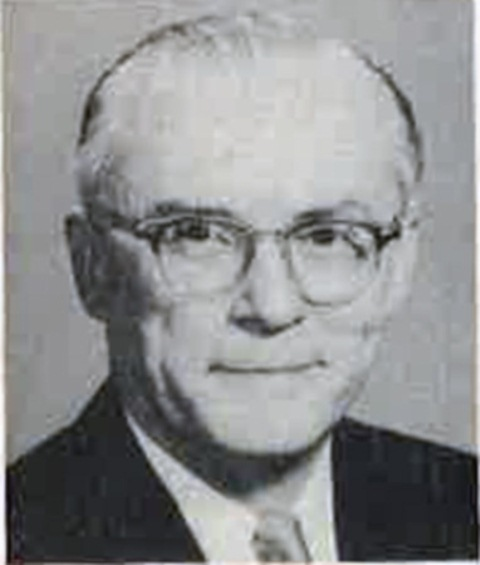
Nominee	Ted Stevens	Wendell P. Kay
Party	Republican	Democratic
Popular vote	47,908	32,456
Percentage	59.61%	40.39%
- Results by state house district Stevens: 50–60% 60–70% 70–80% Kay: 50–60%
U.S. senator before election
Ted Stevens
Republican
Elected U.S. senator
Ted Stevens
Republican

Republican Ted Stevens was appointed December 24, 1968 to finish the term of Democrat Bob Bartlett, who had died in office. The open primary was held August 25, 1970, in which Stevens received 40,411 votes (55.91%), Key received 29,459 votes (23.94%), State senator Joe Josephson received 12,730 votes (18.22%) and Fritz Singer (R) received 1,349 votes (1.93%). In the November 3, 1970 special election to finish the term, he ran against the Democratic Speaker of the Alaska House of Representatives Wendell P. Kay. Stevens easily won with almost 60% of the vote.

1970 United States Senate special election in Alaska
Party	Candidate	Votes	%
Republican	Ted Stevens (Incumbent)	47,908	59.61
Democratic	Wendell P. Kay	32,456	40.39
Majority		14,452	18.22
Turnout		80,364	
Republican hold			

== Arizona ==
Arizona election
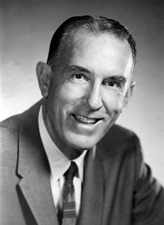

Nominee	Paul Fannin	Sam Grossman
Party	Republican	Democratic
Popular vote	228,284	179,512
Percentage	55.98%	44.02%
- County results Fannin: 50–60% 60–70% Grossman: 50–60% 60–70% 70–80%
U.S. senator before election
Paul Fannin
Republican
Elected U.S. senator
Paul Fannin
Republican

Incumbent Republican Paul Fannin decided to run for re-election to a second term, running unopposed in the Republican primary. Fannin defeated Democratic businessman Sam Grossman in the general election.

Democratic primary results
Party	Candidate	Votes	%
Democratic	Sam Grossman	78,006	65.24
Democratic	John Kruglick, Doctor	27,324	22.85
Democratic	H. L. Kelly	14,238	11.91
Total votes		119,568	100.00

1970 United States Senate election in Arizona
Party	Candidate	Votes	%
Republican	Paul Fannin (Incumbent)	228,284	55.98
Democratic	Sam Grossman	179,512	44.02
Majority		48,772	11.96
Turnout		407,796	
Republican hold			

== California ==
California election
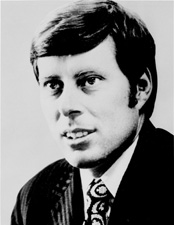

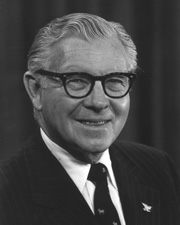
Nominee	John V. Tunney	George Murphy
Party	Democratic	Republican
Popular vote	3,496,558	2,877,617
Percentage	53.86%	44.33%
- County results Tunney: 40–50% 50–60% 60–70% Murphy: 40–50% 50–60%
U.S. senator before election
George Murphy
Republican
Elected U.S. senator
John V. Tunney
Democratic

In 1964, Republican actor George Murphy defeated Democrat and Lyndon B. Johnson's Press Secretary, Pierre Salinger, in a close contest with about 52% of the vote. Murphy faced a primary challenge from billionaire Norton Simon, who took nearly 33% of the vote in the Republican primary. Democrats nominated John V. Tunney after a close-fought contest between Tunney and Representative George Brown Jr. In the general election, Murphy lost re-election to Tunney by nearly ten points. Murphy's recent surgery and staunch support for the lingering Vietnam War worked against him, as did reports that he had continued to receive a salary from Technicolor after taking office. Tunney's successful Senate race in 1970 was reportedly the inspiration for the 1972 Robert Redford film The Candidate.

1970 United States Senate election in California
Party	Candidate	Votes	%
Democratic	John V. Tunney	3,496,558	53.86
Republican	George Murphy (Incumbent)	2,877,617	44.32
Peace and Freedom	Robert Scheer	61,251	0.94
American Independent	Charles C. Ripley	56,731	0.87
Majority		618,941	9.54
Turnout		6,492,157	
Democratic gain from Republican			

== Connecticut ==
Connecticut election
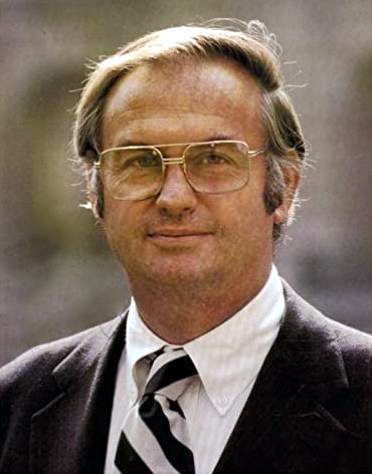

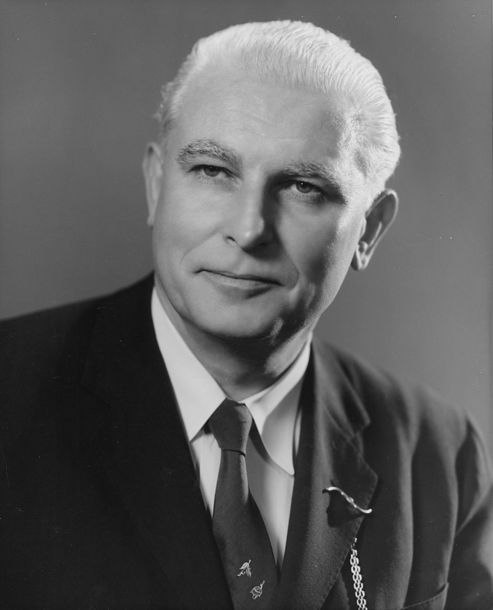
Nominee	Lowell P. Weicker Jr.	Joseph Duffey	Thomas J. Dodd
Party	Republican	Democratic	Independent
Popular vote	454,721	368,111	266,497
Percentage	41.74%	33.79%	24.46%
- Weicker: 30–40% 40–50% 50–60% 60–70% 70–80% Duffey: 30–40% 40–50% Dodd: 30–40% 40–50%
U.S. senator before election
Thomas J. Dodd
Democratic
Elected U.S. senator
Lowell P. Weicker Jr.
Republican

Republican Lowell P. Weicker Jr. defeated Democrat Joseph Duffey and incumbent Thomas J. Dodd who ran this time as an independent. Dodd entered the race at the last minute and split the Democratic vote, allowing Weicker to win with only 42% of the vote.

Connecticut general election
Party	Candidate	Votes	%
Republican	Lowell P. Weicker Jr.	454,721	41.74
Democratic	Joseph Duffey	368,111	33.79
Independent	Thomas J. Dodd (Incumbent)	266,497	24.46
Majority		86,610	7.95
Turnout		1,089,329	
Republican hold			

== Delaware ==
1970 United States Senate election in Delaware
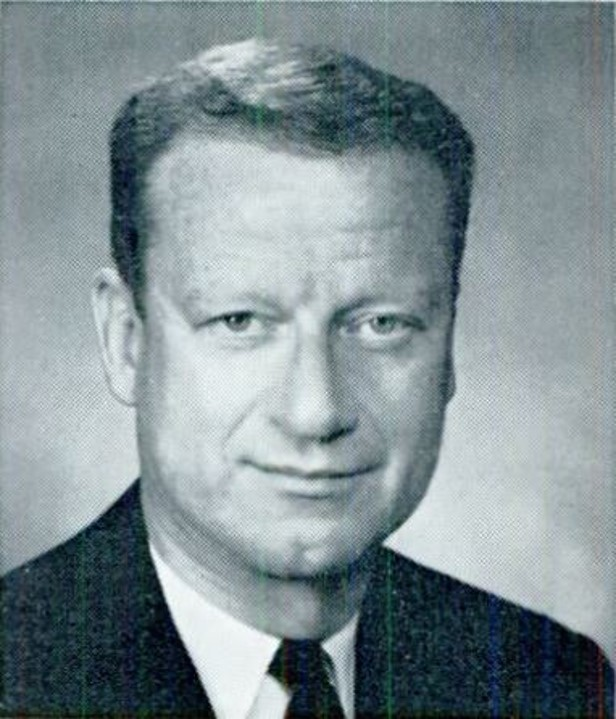

Nominee	William Roth	Jacob W. Zimmerman
Party	Republican	Democratic
Popular vote	94,979	64,740
Percentage	58.83%	40.10%
- County Results; Roth: 50-60% 60-70%
U.S. senator before election
John J. Williams
Republican
Elected U.S. senator
William Roth
Republican

Republican John J. Williams was originally elected in 1946 to the U.S. Senate. Williams was easily re-elected three more times but decided to retire in 1971. Republican Representative William Roth faced Democrat potato farmer Jacob Zimmerman in the general election. Roth defeated Zimmerman by a landslide eighteen percentage points in the general election. He was re-elected in 1976, 1982, 1988, and 1994 before losing re-election to Democrat Tom Carper in 2000. This was despite the state trending Democratic; Roth himself served most of his tenure with future President Joe Biden. Four-term Republican John J. Williams decided to retire, rather than run for re-election. Republican William Roth easily defeated Democrat Jacob Zimmerman by a margin of eighteen percentage points, and went on to serve thirty years in the Senate.

1970 United States Senate election in Delaware
Party	Candidate	Votes	%
Republican	William Roth	94,979	58.83
Democratic	Jacob W. Zimmerman	64,740	40.10
American Independent	Donald G. Gies	1,720	1.07
Majority		30,239	18.73
Turnout		161,439	
Republican hold			

== Florida ==
1970 United States Senate election in Florida
- November 3, 1970
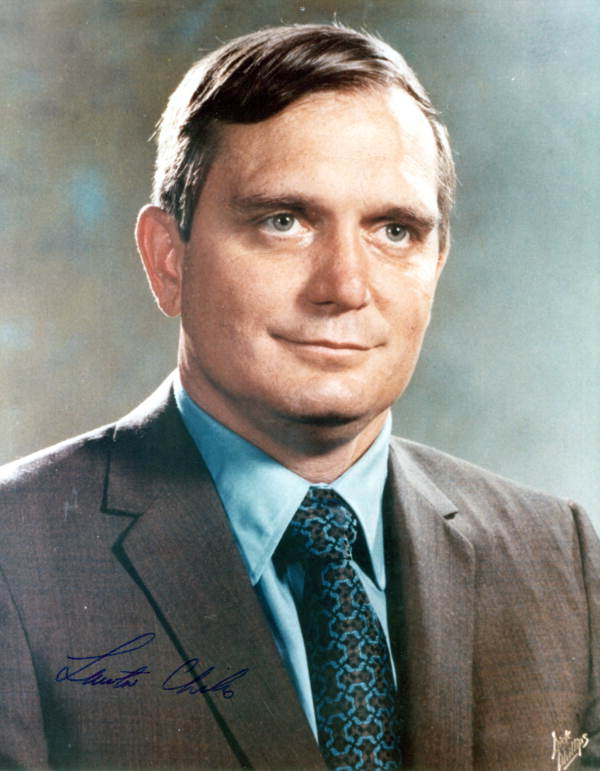

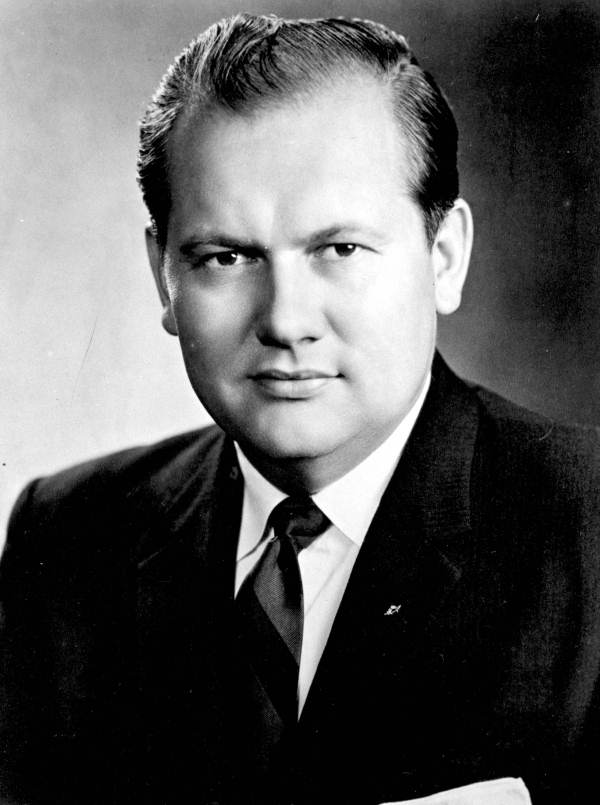
Nominee	Lawton Chiles	Bill Cramer
Party	Democratic	Republican
Popular vote	902,438	772,817
Percentage	53.9%	46.1%
- County results Chiles: 50–60% 60–70% 70–80% 80–90% Cramer: 50–60% 60–70%
U.S. senator before election
Spessard Holland
Democratic
Elected U.S. Senator
Lawton Chiles
Democratic

Incumbent Democrat Spessard Holland retired instead of seeking a fifth term. During the Democratic primary, former Governor C. Farris Bryant and State senator Lawton Chiles advanced to a run-off, having received more votes than Speaker of the Florida House of Representatives Frederick H. Schultz, attorney Alcee Hastings, and State Representative Joel T. Daves, III. Chiles soundly defeated Bryant in the run-off election, scoring a major upset due to his comparatively small name recognition prior to the election. To acquire name recognition and media coverage, Chiles walked about 1,003 miles (1,614 km) across the state of Florida and was given the nickname "Walkin' Lawton".

The Republican primary exposed an in-party feud between Governor Claude R. Kirk Jr. and U.S. Representative William C. Cramer. In the election, Cramer handily defeated G. Harrold Carswell and body shop owner George Balmer; the former was a Fifth Circuit Court of Appeals judge favored by Kirk and had been rejected as a Supreme Court of the United States nominee a few months prior to the primary. Chiles won the election by a relatively small margin of 7.8%, receiving 902,438 votes against Cramer's 772,817 votes.

Incumbent Spessard Holland, who served in the Senate since 1946, decided to retire rather than seek a fifth term. Although the Democratic Party had dominated state elections since the Reconstruction Era, Claude R. Kirk Jr. and Edward Gurney, both Republicans, were elected senator and Governor in 1966 and 1968, respectively.

Democratic Party primary results
Party	Candidate	Votes	%
Democratic	C. Farris Bryant	240,222	32.90
Democratic	Lawton Chiles	188,300	25.79
Democratic	Frederick H. Schultz	175,745	24.07
Democratic	Alcee Hastings	91,948	12.59
Democratic	Joel Daves	33,939	4.65
Total votes		730,154	100.00

Democratic Party primary runoff results
Party	Candidate	Votes	%
Democratic	Lawton Chiles	474,420	65.74
Democratic	Farris Bryant	247,211	34.26
Total votes		721,631	100.00

Republican Primary results
Party	Candidate	Votes	%
Republican	William C. Cramer	220,553	62.52
Republican	G. Harrold Carswell	121,281	34.38
Republican	George Balmer, body shop owner	10,947	3.10
Total votes		352,781	100.00

1970 United States Senate election in Florida
Party	Candidate	Votes	%	±%
Democratic	Lawton Chiles	902,438	53.87	−10.09%
Republican	William C. Cramer	772,817	46.13	+10.09%
Majority		129,621	7.74	−20.17%
Turnout		1,675,255	[?]	[?]
Democratic hold		Swing		

== Hawaii ==
1970 United States Senate election in Hawaii
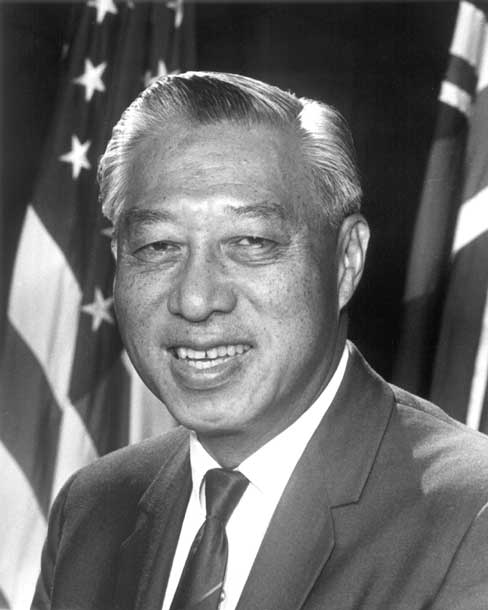

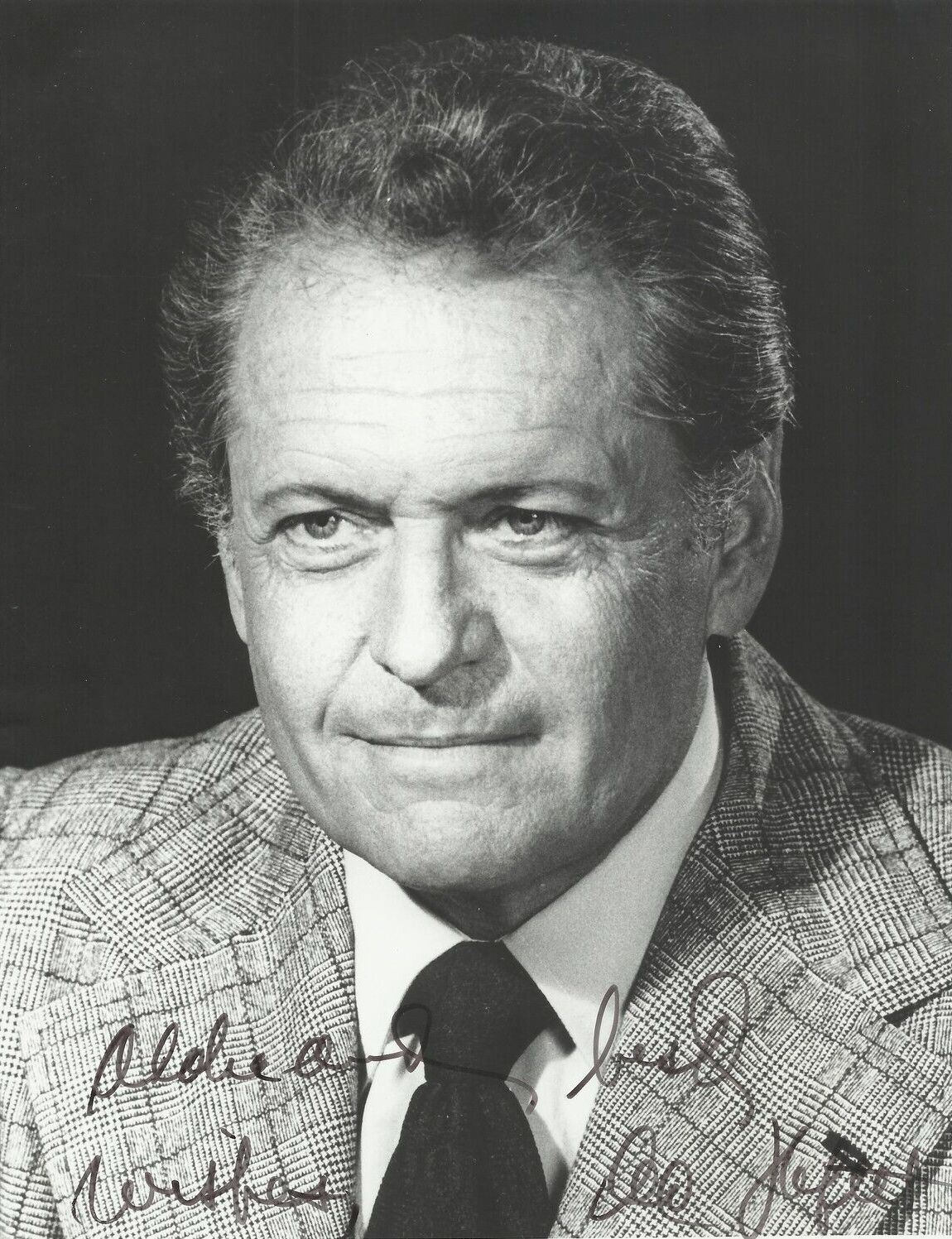
Nominee	Hiram Fong	Cec Heftel
Party	Republican	Democratic
Popular vote	124,163	116,597
Percentage	51.57%	48.43%
- Fong: 50–60%
U.S. senator before election
Hiram Fong
Republican
Elected U.S. senator
Hiram Fong
Republican

Republican Hiram Fong had served as the inaugural Class 1 senator from the state of Hawaii since 1959. From the state's admission into the union, voters tended to lean Democratic, and this trend only continued over time. Fong initially won election to each of his first two terms with 53% of the vote, but in 1970 he faced backlash from voters for his support of the Vietnam War. Cecil Heftel, owner of a radio conglomerate, won the Democratic nomination. Fong was narrowly re-elected over Heftel with 52% of the vote in what would prove to be the closest election of his career. This would ultimately mark the last time that Republicans won a U.S. Senate seat in the state of Hawaii or win more than 44% of the vote.

1970 United States Senate election in Hawaii
Party	Candidate	Votes	%
Republican	Hiram Fong (Incumbent)	124,163	51.57
Democratic	Cecil Heftel	116,597	48.43
Majority		7,566	3.14
Turnout		240,760	
Republican hold			

== Illinois (special) ==
Illinois special election
- Turnout: 67.43%
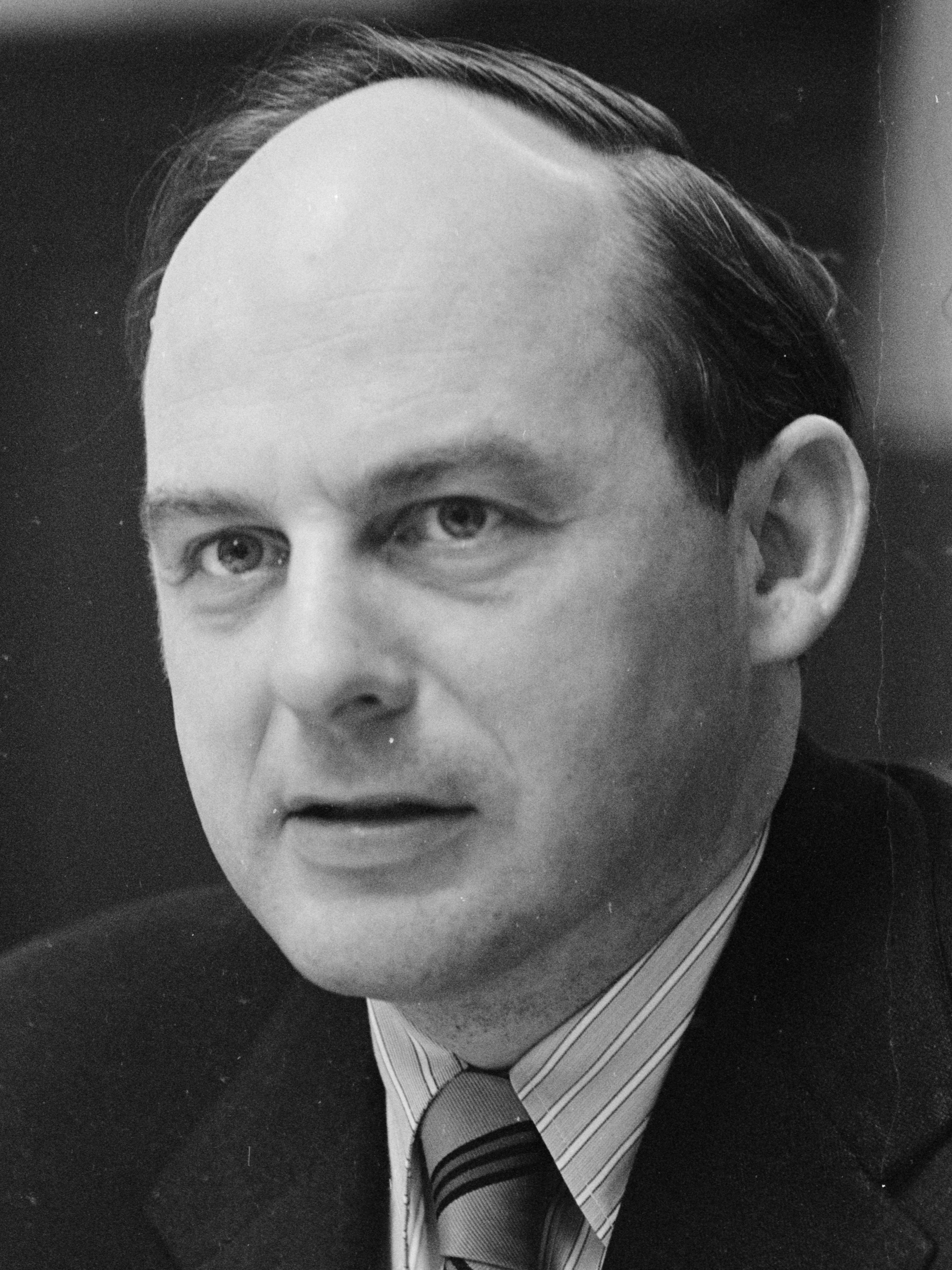

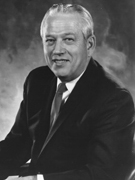
Nominee	Adlai Stevenson III	Ralph Tyler Smith
Party	Democratic	Republican
Popular vote	2,065,054	1,519,718
Percentage	57.37%	42.22%
- County Results; Stevenson: 50–60% 60–70% Smith: 50–60% 60–70%
U.S. senator before election
Ralph Tyler Smith
Republican
Elected U.S. senator
Adlai Stevenson III
Democratic

A special election was held to fill the remainder of the term of Republican Everett Dirksen, who had died in office. Republican Ralph Tyler Smith had been appointed to fill the seat after Dirksen's death, and he lost the special election to Democrat Adlai Stevenson III.

1970 United States Senate special election in Illinois
Party	Candidate	Votes	%
Democratic	Adlai Stevenson III	2,065,054	57.37
Republican	Ralph Tyler Smith (Incumbent)	1,519,718	42.22
Socialist Workers	Lynn Henderson	8,859	0.25
Socialist Labor	Louis Fisher	5,564	0.15
None	Scattering	77	0.00
Majority		545,336	15.15
Turnout		3,599,272	
Democratic gain from Republican			

== Indiana ==
Indiana election
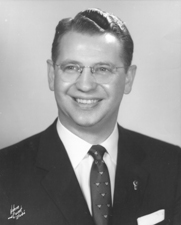

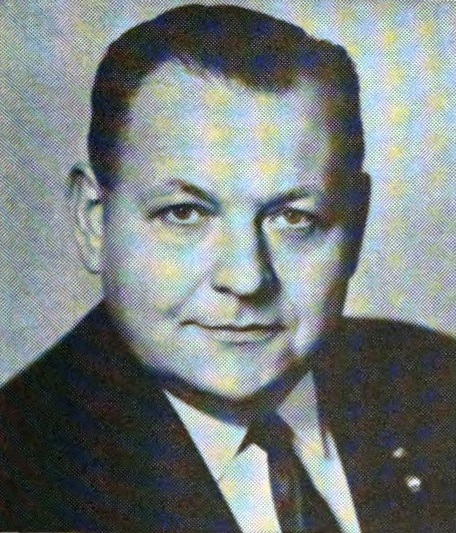
Nominee	Vance Hartke	Richard Roudebush
Party	Democratic	Republican
Popular vote	870,990	866,707
Percentage	50.12%	49.88%
- County Results; Hartke: 50–60% 60–70% Roudebush: 50–60% 60–70% 70–80%
U.S. senator before election
Vance Hartke
Democratic
Elected U.S. Senator
Vance Hartke
Democratic

Democrat Vance Hartke was first elected in 1958 over Republican Harold W. Handley with 56% of the vote. He won re-election in 1964 (a landslide year for Democrats) with a lower share of 54%.

In 1970, he faced his closest contest to date against Republican Representative Richard L. Roudebush. Unlike voters in Hawaii, Indiana voters generally supported the Vietnam War, but Hartke opposed the war. This led Roudebush to run a close race that ultimately was decided after a recount. Hartke won by just about 4,200 votes.

This would be Hartke's last win in a U.S. Senate election. In 1976, he was defeated by Republican Richard Lugar.

1970 United States Senate election in Indiana
Party	Candidate	Votes	%
Democratic	Vance Hartke (Incumbent)	870,990	50.12
Republican	Richard L. Roudebush	866,707	49.88
Majority		4,283	0.24
Turnout		1,737,697	
Democratic hold			

== Maine ==
Maine election
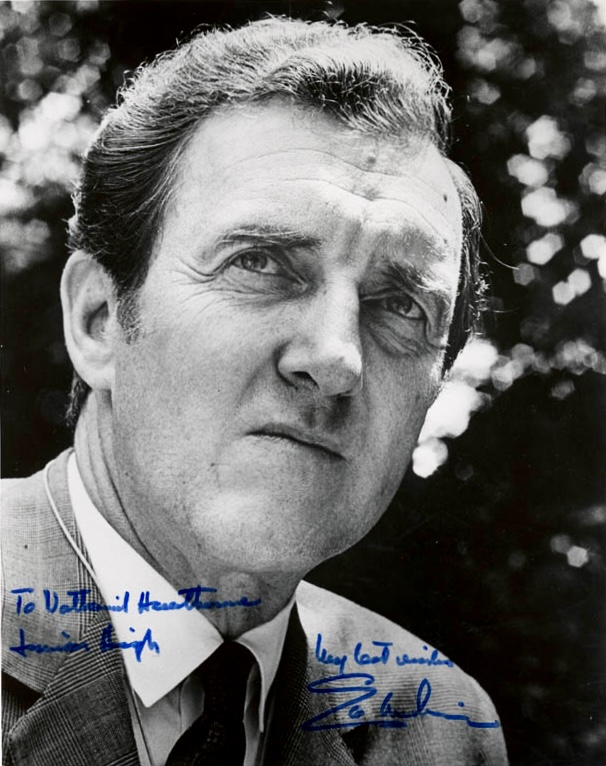

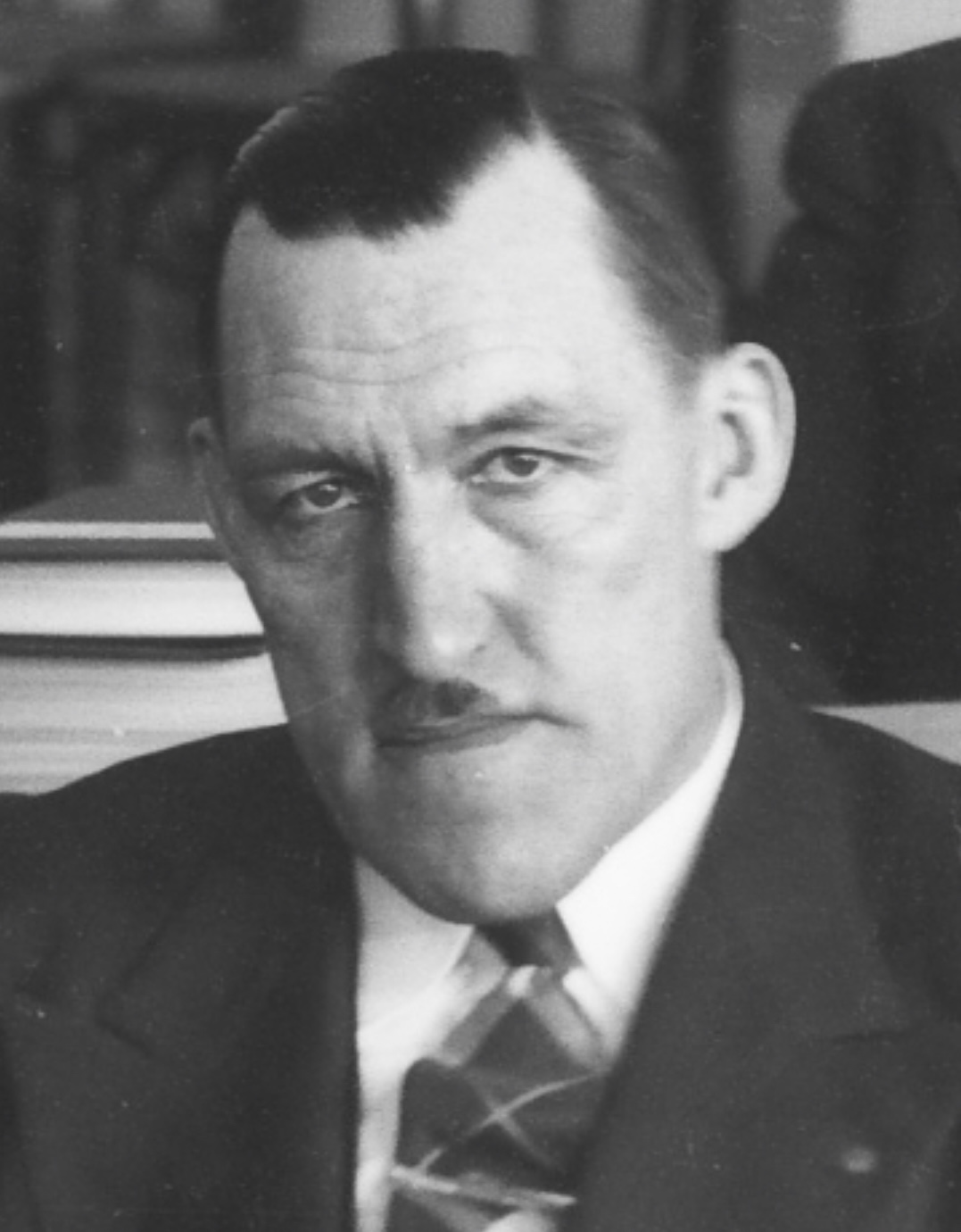
Nominee	Edmund Muskie	Neil S. Bishop
Party	Democratic	Republican
Popular vote	199,954	123,906
Percentage	61.74%	38.26%
- County results Muskie: 50–60% 60–70% 70–80% Bishop: 50–60%
U.S. senator before election
Edmund Muskie
Democratic
Elected U.S. Senator
Edmund Muskie
Democratic

1970 United States Senate election in Maine
Party	Candidate	Votes	%
Democratic	Edmund S. Muskie (Incumbent)	199,954	61.74
Republican	Neil S. Bishop	123,906	38.26
Majority		76,048	23.48
Turnout		323,860	
Democratic hold			

== Maryland ==
Maryland election
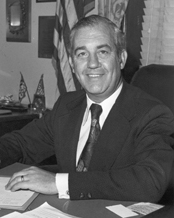

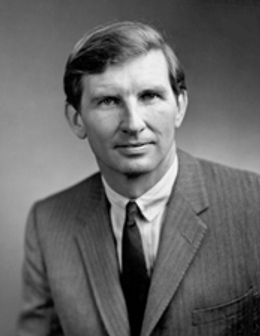
Nominee	J. Glenn Beall Jr.	Joseph Tydings
Party	Republican	Democratic
Popular vote	484,960	460,422
Percentage	50.71%	48.14%
- County results Beall: 50–60% 60–70% 70–80% Tydings: 50–60% 60–70%
U.S. senator before election
Joseph Tydings
Democratic
Elected U.S. Senator
J. Glenn Beall Jr.
Republican

In 1970, Republican J. Glenn Beall ran for re-election to a third term in the U.S. Senate but was defeated by Democrat Joseph Tydings in a landslide, 63-37%. Tydings ran for re-election to a second term in 1970. Republicans nominated Representative J. Glenn Beall Jr., the son of J. Glenn Beall. Tydings faced a primary challenge from segregationist George P. Mahoney but won with 53% of the vote. However, Republican Glenn Beall Jr. won the general election with nearly 51% of the vote to 48% for Tydings. He would serve just one term, losing in 1976 to Democrat Paul Sarbanes.

1970 United States Senate election in Maryland
Party	Candidate	Votes	%
Republican	John Glenn Beall Jr.	484,960	50.71
Democratic	Joseph D. Tydings (Incumbent)	460,422	48.14
American Independent	Harvey Wilder	10,988	1.15
Majority		24,538	2.57
Turnout		956,370	
Republican gain from Democratic			

== Massachusetts ==
Massachusetts election
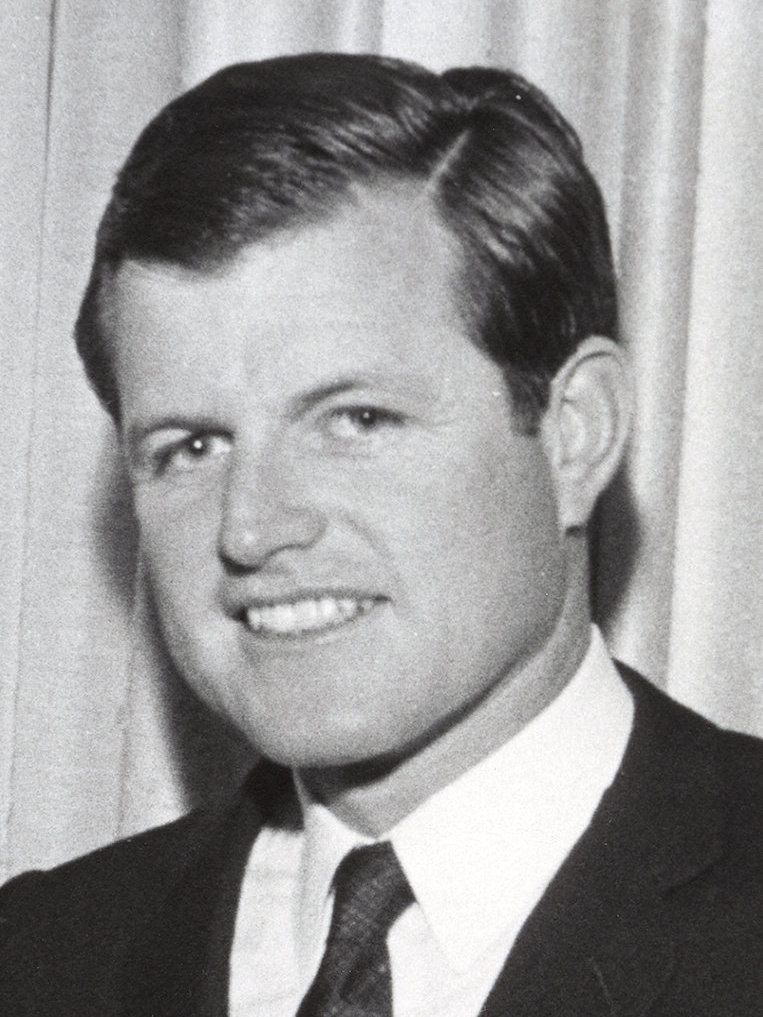

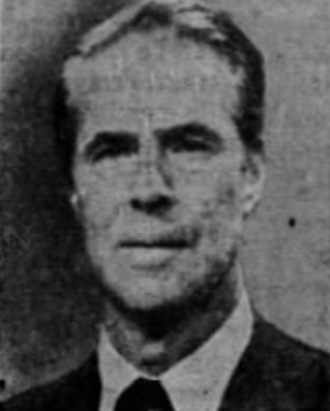
Nominee	Ted Kennedy	Josiah Spaulding
Party	Democratic	Republican
Popular vote	1,202,856	715,978
Percentage	62.2%	37.0%

Kennedy
40–50%
50–60%
60–70%
70–80%
80–90%
Spaulding
40–50%
50–60%
60–70%
70–80%
80–90%
U.S. senator before election
Ted Kennedy
Democratic
Elected U.S. senator
Ted Kennedy
Democratic

Incumbent Democrat Ted Kennedy defeated his challengers. This was Kennedy's first election run since the 1969 Chappaquiddick incident. Kennedy won 62.2%, down from 74.3% that he won in the previous election in 1964; this decrease was due to numerous factors including Chappaquiddick and a far more favorable environment for the Republicans than the Democratic landslide year of 1964.

The Republican nominee was Josiah Spaulding, a businessman and Republican leader in Massachusetts. He led a group of delegates at the 1968 Republican National Convention who unsuccessfully sought to nominate Nelson A. Rockefeller over Richard Nixon.

Other candidates were Lawrence Gilfedder (Socialist Labor) and Mark R. Shaw (Prohibition), a former Prohibition Party candidate for U.S. senator from Massachusetts in 1946, 1952, 1958, 1969, 1962, and 1966. He was the party's candidate for governor of Massachusetts in 1948 and 1956. In 1964, he was the Prohibition Party's candidate for vice-president of the United States.

General election
Party	Candidate	Votes	%	±%
Democratic	Edward M. Kennedy (Incumbent)	1,202,856	62.16	−12.1
Republican	Josiah Spaulding	715,978	37.00	+11.58
Socialist Labor	Lawrence Gilfedder	10,378	0.54	+0.33
Prohibition	Mark R. Shaw	5,944	0.31	+0.19
None	Scattering	451	0.02	+0.02
Majority		486,878	25.16	
Turnout		1,935,607		
Democratic hold		Swing		

== Michigan ==
1970 United States Senate election in Michigan
- November 3, 1970
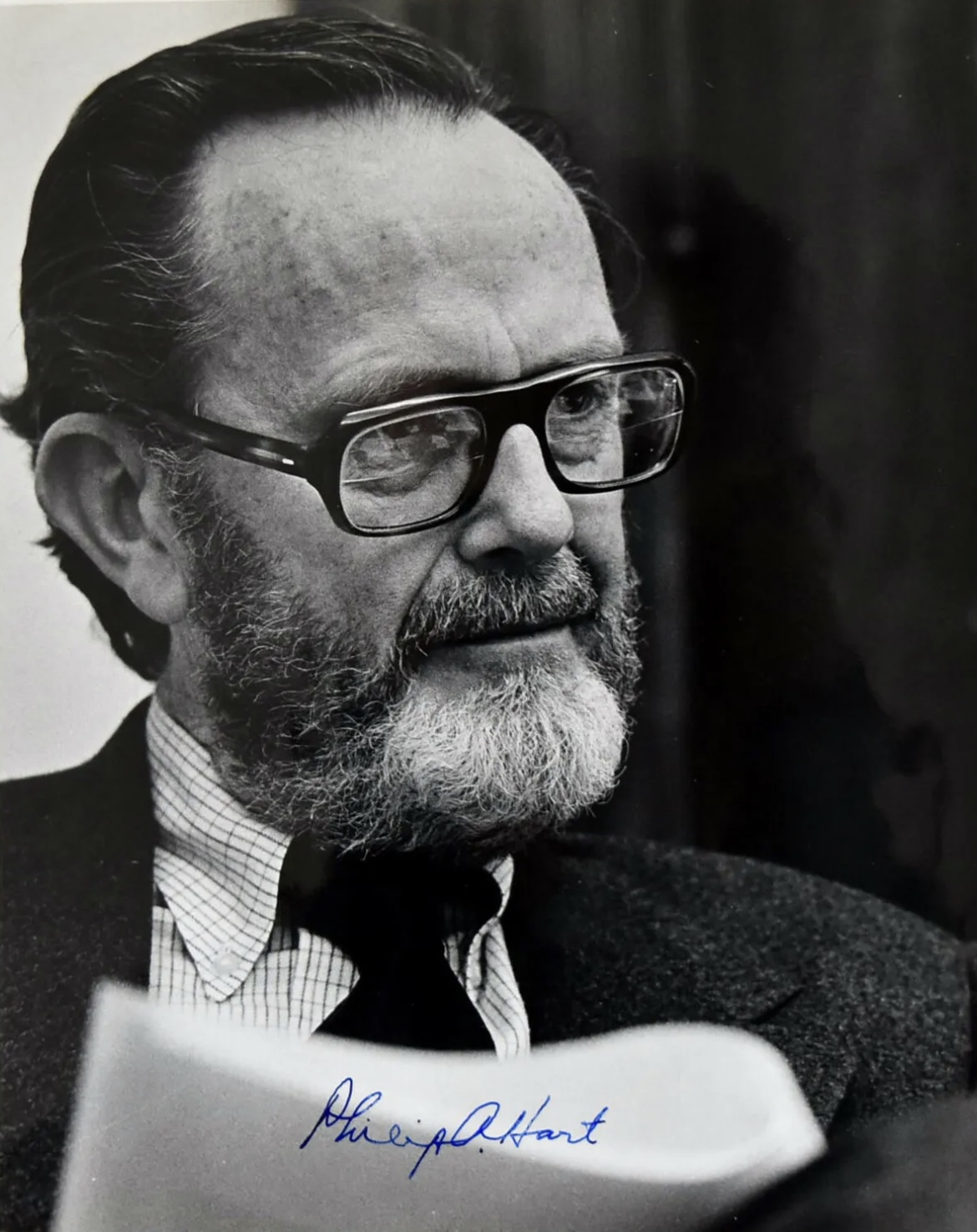

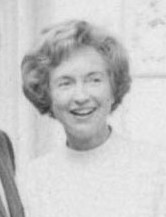
Nominee	Philip Hart	Lenore Romney
Party	Democratic	Republican
Popular vote	1,744,672	858,438
Percentage	66.84%	32.89%
- County results Hart: 40–50% 50–60% 60–70% 70–80% Romney: 50–60%
U.S. senator before election
Philip Hart
Democratic
Elected U.S. Senator
Philip Hart
Democratic

1970 United States Senate election in Michigan
Party	Candidate	Votes	%
Democratic	Philip Hart (Incumbent)	1,744,672	66.83
Republican	Lenore Romney	858,438	32.88
Socialist Workers	Paul Ludieu	3,861	0.15
Socialist Labor	James Sim	3,254	0.12
None	Scattering	538	0.02
Majority		886,234	33.95
Turnout		2,610,763	
Democratic hold			

== Minnesota ==
1970 United States Senate election in Minnesota
- November 3, 1970
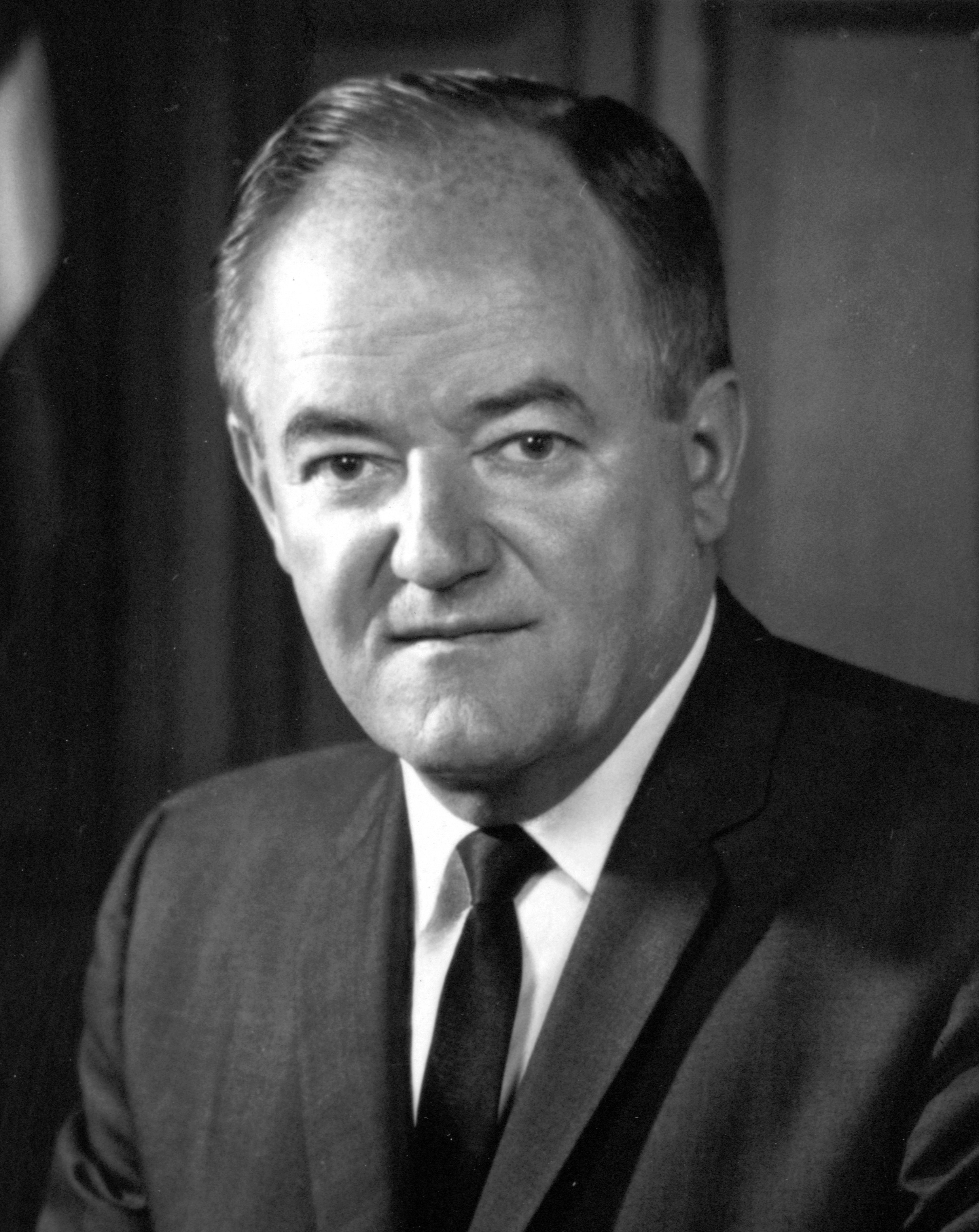

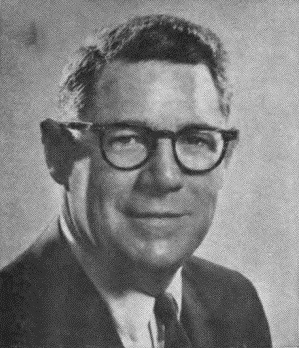
Nominee	Hubert H. Humphrey	Clark MacGregor
Party	Democratic (DFL)	Republican
Popular vote	788,256	568,025
Percentage	57.75%	41.62%
- County results Humphrey: 40-50% 50–60% 60–70% 70–80% MacGregor: 50-60%
U.S. senator before election
Eugene J. McCarthy
Democratic (DFL)
Elected U.S. Senator
Hubert H. Humphrey
Democratic (DFL)

Incumbent Democrat Eugene McCarthy retired instead of seeking a third term. Former Democratic U.S. senator, Vice President and 1968 presidential nominee Hubert Humphrey defeated Republican U.S. Representative Clark MacGregor.

Democratic primary election results
Party	Candidate	Votes	%
Democratic (DFL)	Hubert H. Humphrey	338,705	79.25
Democratic (DFL)	Earl D. Craig	88,709	20.76

Republican primary election results
Party	Candidate	Votes	%
Republican	Clark MacGregor	220,353	93.31
Republican	John D. Baucom	15,797	6.69

General election results
Party	Candidate	Votes	%
Democratic (DFL)	Hubert H. Humphrey	788,256	57.75
Republican	Clark MacGregor	568,025	41.62
Socialist Workers	Nancy Strebe	6,122	0.45
Industrial Government	William Braatz	2,484	0.18
Majority		220,231	16.13
Turnout		1,364,887	
Democratic (DFL) hold			

== Mississippi ==
1970 United States Senate election in Mississippi
- November 3, 1970
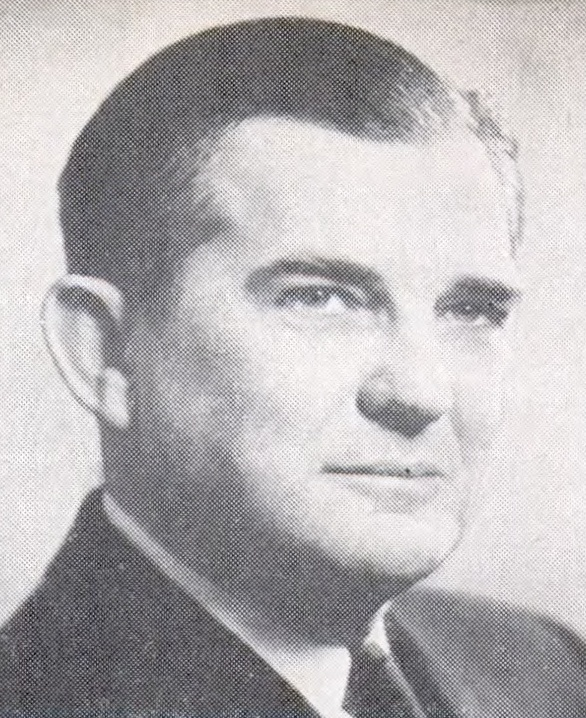

Nominee	John C. Stennis	William Richard Thompson
Party	Democratic	Independent
Popular vote	286,622	37,593
Percentage	88.40%	11.60%
- County results Stennis: 50–60% 60–70% 70–80% 80–90% >90%
U.S. senator before election
John C. Stennis
Democratic
Elected U.S. Senator
John C. Stennis
Democratic

1970 United States Senate election in Mississippi
Party	Candidate	Votes	%
Democratic	John C. Stennis (Incumbent)	286,622	88.40
Independent	William Richard Thompson	37,593	11.60
Majority		249,029	76.80
Turnout		324,215	
Democratic hold			

== Missouri ==
1970 United States Senate election in Missouri
- November 3, 1970
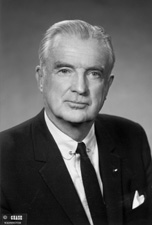

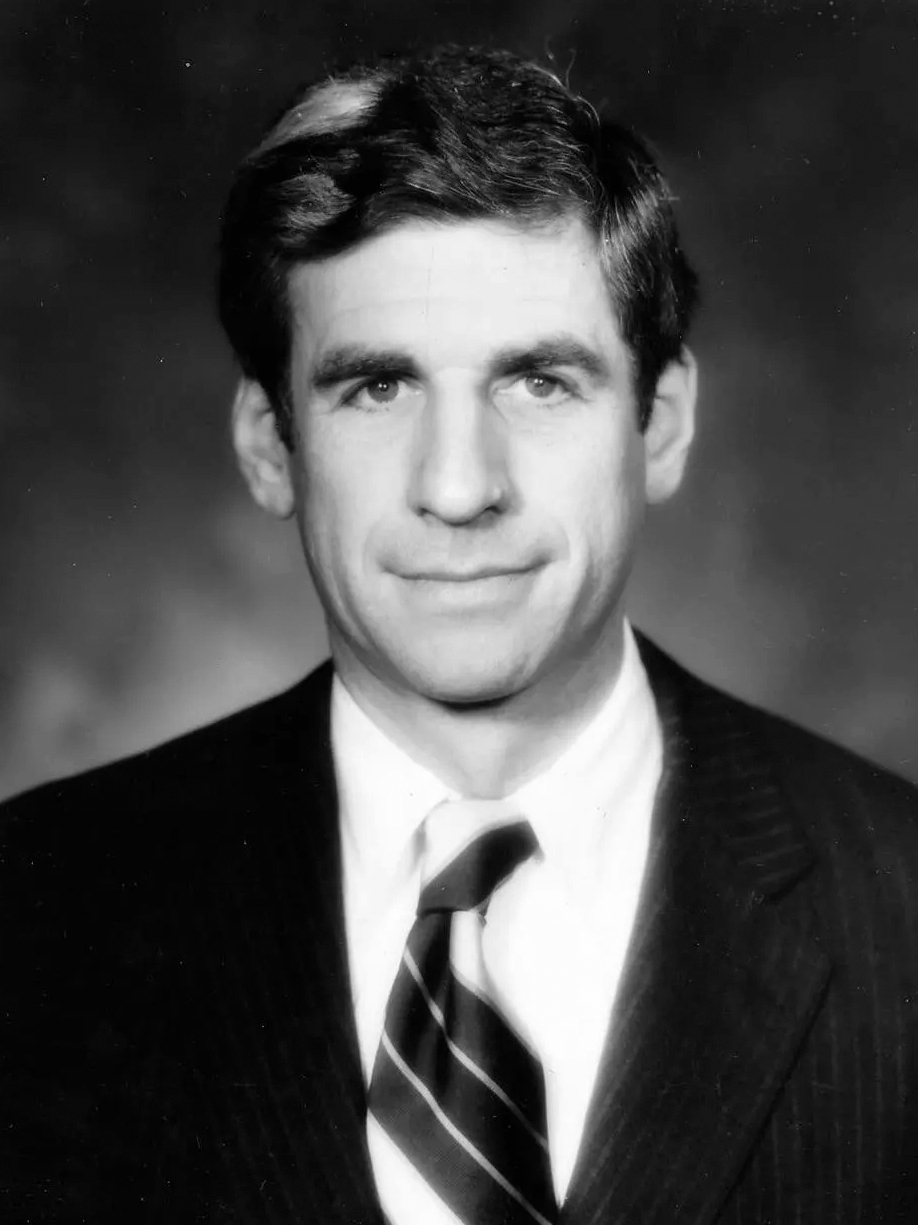
Nominee	Stuart Symington	John Danforth
Party	Democratic	Republican
Popular vote	1,090,067	813,571
Percentage	51.03%	48.15%
- County Results; Symington: 40–50% 50–60% 60–70% 70–80% Danforth: 50-60% 60-70% 70-80%
U.S. senator before election
Stuart Symington
Democratic
Elected U.S. Senator
Stuart Symington
Democratic

Incumbent Democrat Stuart Symington was originally elected in 1952 over Republican James P. Kem with 54% of the vote. He won re-election in landslide victories with 66% of the vote in 1958 and 1964. He ran for a fourth term in 1970. Symington faced little primary opposition. Republican Missouri Attorney General John Danforth won the Republican primary. In the general election, Symington led in polling, but Danforth closed the gap during the campaign and ran closely against Symington. Symington defeated Danforth 51-48%. This would be Symington's closest election to the U.S. Senate, and Danforth would succeed him in 1976, serving for three terms.

1970 United States Senate election in Missouri
Party	Candidate	Votes	%
Democratic	Stuart Symington (Incumbent)	654,831	51.03
Republican	John C. Danforth	617,903	48.15
American Independent	Gene Chapman	10,065	0.78
Independent	E. J. DiGirolamo	513	0.04
Majority		36,928	2.88
Turnout		1,283,312	
Democratic hold			

== Montana ==
1970 United States Senate election in Montana
- November 3, 1970
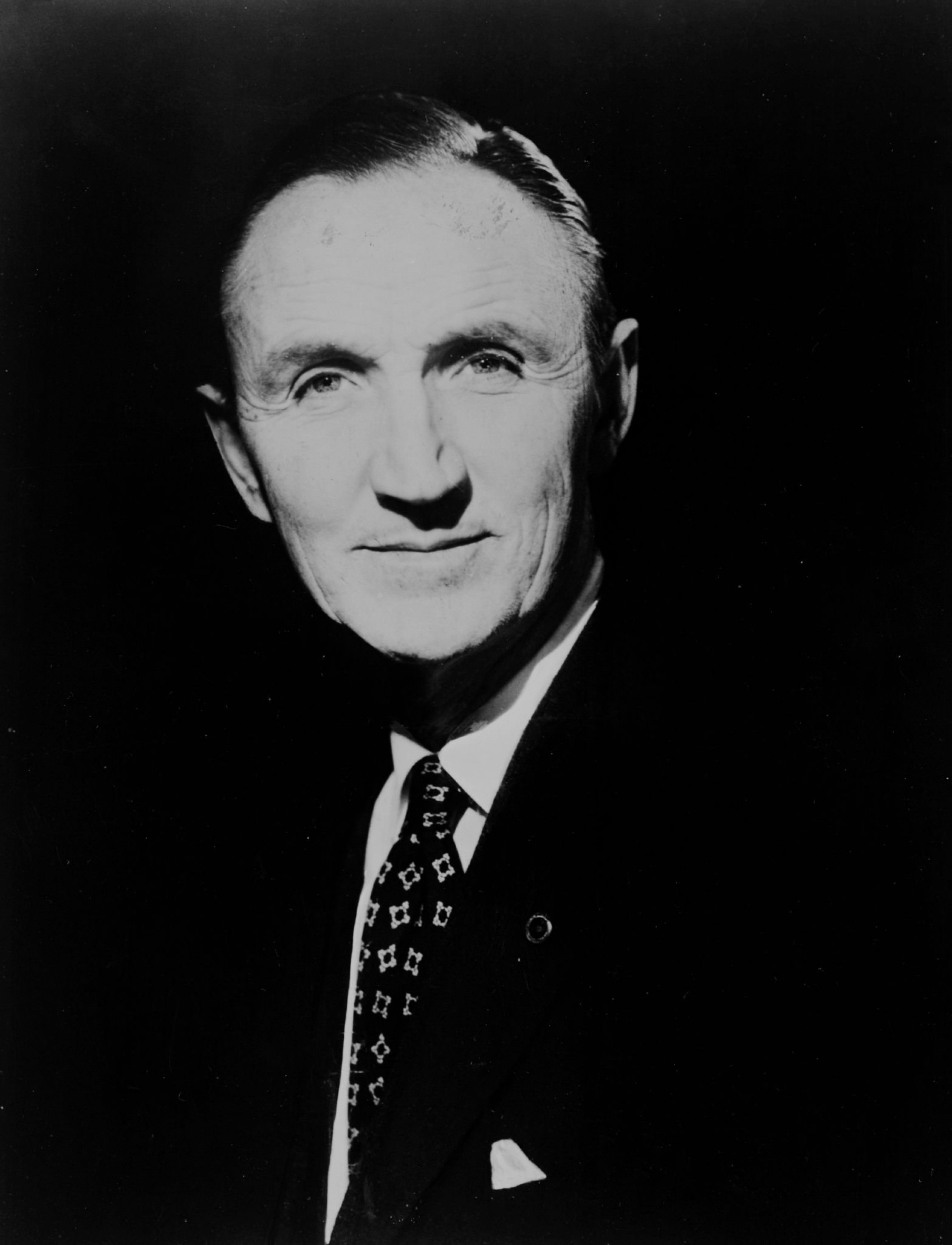

Nominee	Mike Mansfield	Harold E. Wallace
Party	Democratic	Republican
Popular vote	150,060	97,809
Percentage	60.54%	39.46%
- County results Mansfield: 50–60% 60–70% 70–80% Wallace: 50-60% 60-70%
U.S. senator before election
Mike Mansfield
Democratic
Elected U.S. Senator
Mike Mansfield
Democratic

Democratic incumbent Mike Mansfield, the Senate Majority Leader who was first elected to the Senate in 1952, and was re-elected in 1958 and 1964, ran for re-election. Mansfield won the primary against several opponents, and advanced to the general election, where he was opposed by Harold E. Wallace, a sporting goods salesman and the Republican nominee. While his margin of victory decreased slightly from 1964, Mansfield still managed to defeat Wallace overwhelmingly, winning his fourth and (what would turn out to be his) final term in the Senate.

Democratic Party primary results
Party	Candidate	Votes	%
Democratic	Mike Mansfield (Incumbent)	68,146	77.17
Democratic	Tom McDonald	10,773	12.20
Democratic	John W. Lawlor	19,384	10.63
Total votes		88,303	100.00

Republican Primary results
Party	Candidate	Votes	%
Republican	Harold E. Wallace	45,549	100.00
Total votes		45,549	100.00

1970 United States Senate election in Montana
Party	Candidate	Votes	%	±%
Democratic	Mike Mansfield (Incumbent)	150,060	60.54	−3.97%
Republican	Harold E. Wallace	97,809	39.46	+3.97%
Majority		52,251	21.08	−7.95%
Turnout		247,869		
Democratic hold		Swing		

== Nebraska ==
1970 United States Senate election in Nebraska
- November 3, 1970
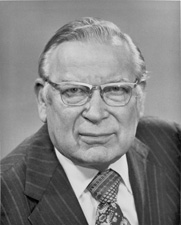

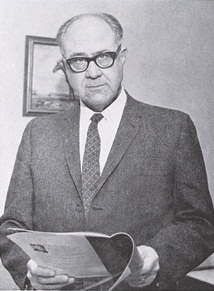
Nominee	Roman Hruska	Frank B. Morrison
Party	Republican	Democratic
Popular vote	240,894	217,681
Percentage	52.49%	47.43%
- County results Hruska: 50–60% 60–70% 70–80% Morrison: 50–60% 60–70%
U.S. senator before election
Roman Hruska
Republican
Elected U.S. Senator
Roman Hruska
Republican

The incumbent Republican Roman Hruska was re-elected.

1970 United States Senate election in Nebraska
Party	Candidate	Votes	%
Republican	Roman Hruska (Incumbent)	240,894	52.49
Democratic	Frank B. Morrison	217,681	47.43
None	Scattering	391	0.09
Majority		23,213	5.06
Turnout		458,966	
Republican hold			

== Nevada ==
Nevada election
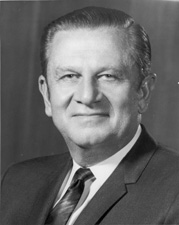

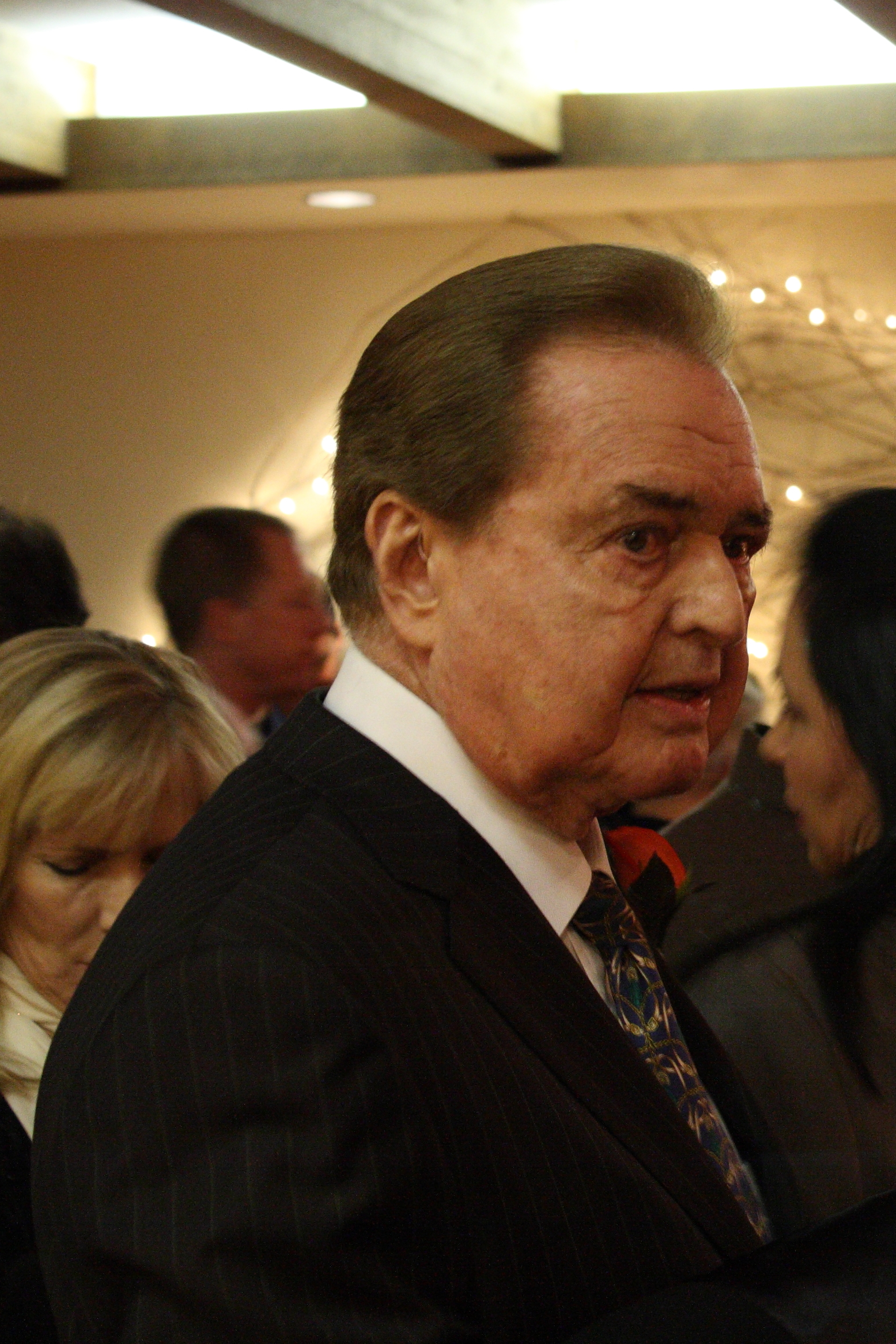
Nominee	Howard Cannon	William Raggio
Party	Democratic	Republican
Popular vote	85,187	60,838
Percentage	57.7%	41.2%
- County results Cannon: 40–50% 50–60% 60–70% Raggio: 50–60% 60–70%
U.S. senator before election
Howard Cannon
Democratic
Elected U.S. senator
Howard Cannon
Democratic

Democrat Howard Cannon, the incumbent since 1959, won re-election to a third term over William Raggio, the Washoe County District Attorney.

In the Senate, Cannon was known as a moderate in the Democratic Party. He served as chairman of several committees, including the rules committee and the inaugural arrangements committee. Cannon was nearly defeated for re-election in 1964 by Republican Lieutenant Governor Paul Laxalt in one of the closest election in history. However, he became more popular over the next few years and defeated D.A. William Raggio, whose 1970 senate campaign began his long political career. Raggio ran for the Nevada Senate in 1972 and won. He then served there for decades to come.

General election results
Party	Candidate	Votes	%	±%
Democratic	Howard Cannon (Incumbent)	85,187	57.65	+7.63%
Republican	William Raggio	60,838	41.17	−8.81%
American Independent	Harold G. DeSellem	1,743	1.18	
Majority		24,349	16.48	+16.44%
Turnout		147,768		
Democratic hold		Swing		

== New Jersey ==
New Jersey election
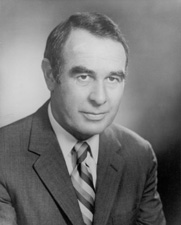

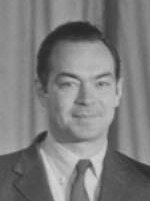
Nominee	Harrison A. Williams	Nelson G. Gross
Party	Democratic	Republican
Popular vote	1,157,074	903,026
Percentage	54.02%	42.16%
- County Results; Williams: 40–50% 50–60% 60–70% Gross: 40–50% 50-60%
U.S. senator before election
Harrison A. Williams
Democratic
Elected U.S. senator
Harrison A. Williams
Democratic

1970 United States Senate election in New Jersey
Party	Candidate	Votes	%
Democratic	Harrison A. Williams (Incumbent)	1,157,074	56.17
Republican	Nelson G. Gross	903,026	43.83
Majority		254,048	12.34
Turnout		2,060,100	
Democratic hold			

== New Mexico ==
New Mexico election
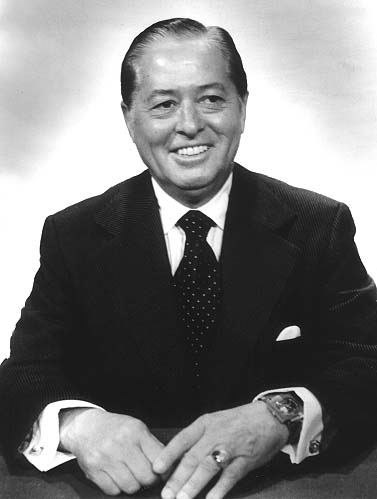

Nominee	Joseph Montoya	Anderson Carter
Party	Democratic	Republican
Popular vote	151,486	135,004
Percentage	52.3%	46.6%
- County results Montoya: 50–60% 60–70% Carter: 40–50% 50–60% 60–70%
U.S. senator before election
Joseph Montoya
Democratic
Elected U.S. senator
Joseph Montoya
Democratic

Incumbent Democrat Joseph Montoya successfully ran for re-election to a second term, defeating Republican Anderson Carter.

Democratic primary results
Party	Candidate	Votes	%
Democratic	Joseph Montoya, Incumbent	85,285	73.10
Democratic	Richard B. Edwards	31,381	26.90
Majority		53,904	46.20
Total votes		116,666	100.00

Republican primary results
Party	Candidate	Votes	%
Republican	Anderson Carter	32,122	57.76
Republican	David Cargo, Governor of New Mexico	16,951	32.28
Republican	Harold G. Thompson	5,544	9.97
Majority		14,171	25.48
Total votes		55,617	100.00

General election results
Party	Candidate	Votes	%
Democratic	Joseph Montoya, Incumbent	151,486	52.26
Republican	Anderson Carter	135,004	46.57
People's Constitutional	William Higgs	3,382	1.17
Majority		16,482	5.69
Total votes		289,872	100.00
Democratic hold			

== New York ==
New York election
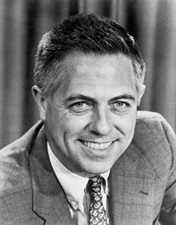

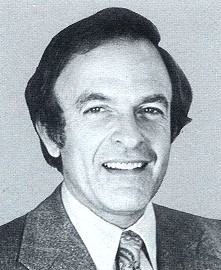

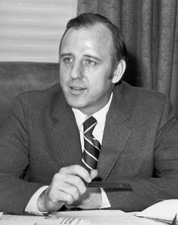
Nominee	James L. Buckley	Richard Ottinger	Charles Goodell
Party	Conservative	Democratic	Republican
Popular vote	2,288,190	2,171,232	1,404,472
Percentage	38.95%	36.96%	23.91%
- County results Buckley: 30–40% 40–50% 50–60% 60–70% Ottinger: 30–40% 40–50% Goodell: 30–40% 40–50% 50–60%
U.S. senator before election
Charles Goodell
Republican
Elected U.S. senator
James L. Buckley
Conservative

Incumbent Republican Charles Goodell, who was recently appointed to the seat by Governor Nelson Rockefeller after senator Bobby Kennedy (D) was assassinated, ran for a full term, but was defeated by the Conservative Party of New York nominee James L. Buckley. Other candidates included: Richard Ottinger, U.S. Congressman (1965–1971, 1975–1985), Kevin P. McGovern, Paul O'Dwyer, Former New York City Council Member from Manhattan, Ted Sorensen, Former Advisor and Speechwriter to President John F. Kennedy, Richard D. McCarthy, U.S. Congressman (1965–1971).

Conservative Party Convention results
Party	Candidate	Votes	%
Conservative	James L. Buckley	37,940	91.38
Conservative	Kevin P. McGovern	3,580	8.62
Total votes		41,520	100.00

Democratic Party Primary results
Party	Candidate	Votes	%
Democratic	Richard Ottinger	366,789	39.61
Democratic	Paul O'Dwyer	302,438	32.66
Democratic	Ted Sorensen	154,434	16.68
Democratic	Richard D. McCarthy	102,224	11.04
Total votes		925,885	100.00

Republican Party Convention results
Party	Candidate	Votes	%
Republican	Charles Goodell (Incumbent)	311	86.39
	Abstaining	49	13.61
Total votes		360	100.00

Liberal Party Convention results
Party	Candidate	Votes	%
Liberal	Charles Goodell (Incumbent)	201	67.00
Liberal	Paul O'Dwyer	48	16.00
Liberal	Richard D. McCarthy	33	11.00
Liberal	Richard Ottinger	12	4.00
Liberal	Ted Sorensen	6	2.00
Total votes		300	100.00

General election results
Party	Candidate	Votes	%
Conservative	James L. Buckley	2,288,190	38.95
Democratic	Richard Lawrence Ottinger	2,171,232	36.96
Republican	Charles Goodell (Incumbent)	1,178,679	
Liberal	Charles Goodell (Incumbent)	225,793	
Republican + Liberal Party	Charles Goodell (Incumbent)	1,404,472	23.91
Communist	Arnold Johnson	4,097	0.07
Socialist Workers	Kipp Dawson	3,549	0.06
Socialist Labor	John Emanuel	3,204	0.06
Majority		116,958	1.99
Turnout		5,904,744	
Conservative gain from Republican			

== North Dakota ==
North Dakota election
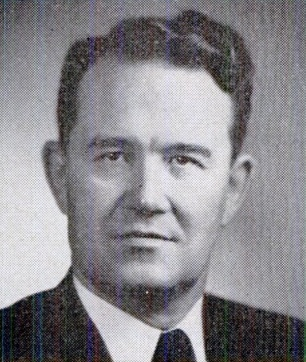

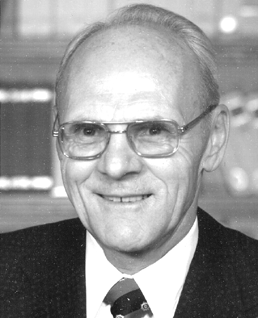
Nominee	Quentin Burdick	Thomas Kleppe
Party	Democratic–NPL	Republican
Popular vote	134,519	82,996
Percentage	61.27%	37.80%
- County results Burdick: 50–60% 60–70% 70–80% Kleppe: 50–60% 60–70%
U.S. senator before election
Quentin Burdick
Democratic–NPL
Elected U.S. Senator
Quentin Burdick
Democratic–NPL

Incumbent Democratic-NPL Party Senator Quentin N. Burdick was re-elected to his third term, defeating Republican candidate Thomas S. Kleppe, who later became the United States Secretary of the Interior.

Only Burdick filed as a Dem-NPLer, and the endorsed Republican candidate was Thomas S. Kleppe, who was finishing his second and final term as a Representative for North Dakota's second congressional district. Burdick and Kleppe won the primary elections for their respective parties.

One independent candidate, Russell Kleppe, also filed before the deadline.

1970 United States Senate election in North Dakota
Party	Candidate	Votes	%
Democratic–NPL	Quentin Burdick (Incumbent)	134,519	61.27
Republican	Thomas S. Kleppe	82,996	37.80
Independent	Russell Kleppe	2,045	0.93
Majority		51,523	23.47
Turnout		219,560	
Democratic hold			

== Ohio ==
Democrat Stephen M. Young had served in the U.S. Senate since 1958 after defeating Republican John W. Bricker in a close election. Young was re-elected in 1964 over Republican Representative Robert Taft Jr., whose father Robert A. Taft represented Ohio in the U.S. Senate from 1939 until his death in 1953. Young opted to retire in 1971.

Taft Jr. faced a tough primary challenge against Ohio governor Jim Rhodes. He won a bitterly-fought primary by just under 6,000 votes to advance to the general election. Democrat Howard Metzenbaum competed in an equally-competitive primary, defeating former astronaut John Glenn. Metzenbaum and Glenn would both later represent Ohio in the U.S. Senate.

Taft Jr. defeated Metzenbaum in a close election, taking nearly 50% of the vote to just above 47% for Metzenbaum. Metzenbaum would defeat Taft Jr. in a rematch election in 1976, serving until 1995 alongside Glenn.

1970 United States Senate election in Ohio
- November 3, 1970
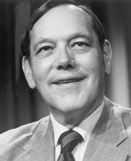

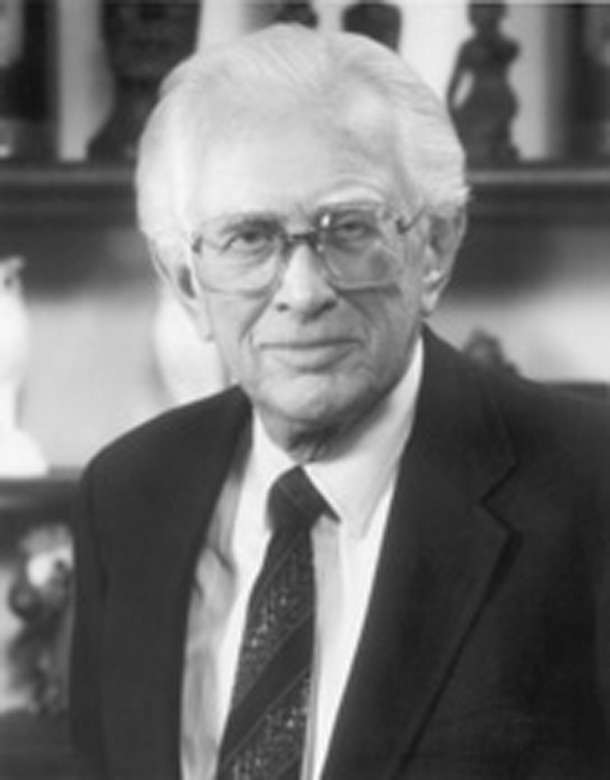
Nominee	Robert Taft Jr.	Howard Metzenbaum
Party	Republican	Democratic
Popular vote	1,565,682	1,495,262
Percentage	49.68%	47.52%
- County results Taft: 40–50% 50–60% 60–70% Metzenbaum: 40–50% 50–60%
U.S. senator before election
Stephen M. Young
Democratic
Elected U.S. Senator
Robert Taft Jr.
Republican

1970 United States Senate election in Ohio
Party	Candidate	Votes	%
Republican	Robert Taft Jr.	1,565,682	49.68
Democratic	Howard M. Metzenbaum	1,495,262	47.45
American Independent	Richard B. Kay	61,261	1.94
Socialist Labor	John O'Neill	29,069	0.92
Majority		70,420	2.23
Turnout		3,151,274	
Republican gain from Democratic			

== Pennsylvania ==
Pennsylvania election
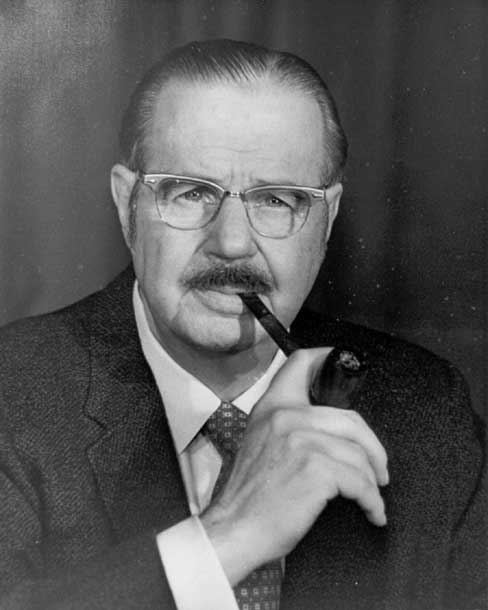

Nominee	Hugh Scott	William Sesler
Party	Republican	Democratic
Popular vote	1,874,106	1,653,774
Percentage	51.4%	45.4%
- County results Scott: 40–50% 50-60% 60-70% 70–80% Sesler: 40–50% 50–60%
U.S. senator before election
Hugh Scott
Republican
Elected U.S. senator
Hugh Scott
Republican

Incumbent Republican Hugh Scott won re-election, defeating Democratic nominee State senator William Sesler.

General election results
Party	Candidate	Votes	%	±%
Republican	Hugh Scott (Incumbent)	1,874,106	51.43	+0.84%
Democratic	William Sesler	1,653,774	45.38	−3.74%
Constitution	Frank W. Gaydosh	85,813	2.36	+2.36%
American Independent	W. Henry McFarland	18,275	0.50	+0.50%
Socialist Labor	Herman A. Johnson	4,375	0.12	−0.02%
Socialist Workers	Robin Maisel	3,970	0.11	−0.04%
Consumer	William R. Mimms	3,932	0.11	+0.11%
N/A	Other	60	0.00	N/A
Majority		220,332	6.05	
Turnout		3,644,305		
Republican hold		Swing		

== Rhode Island ==
Rhode Island election
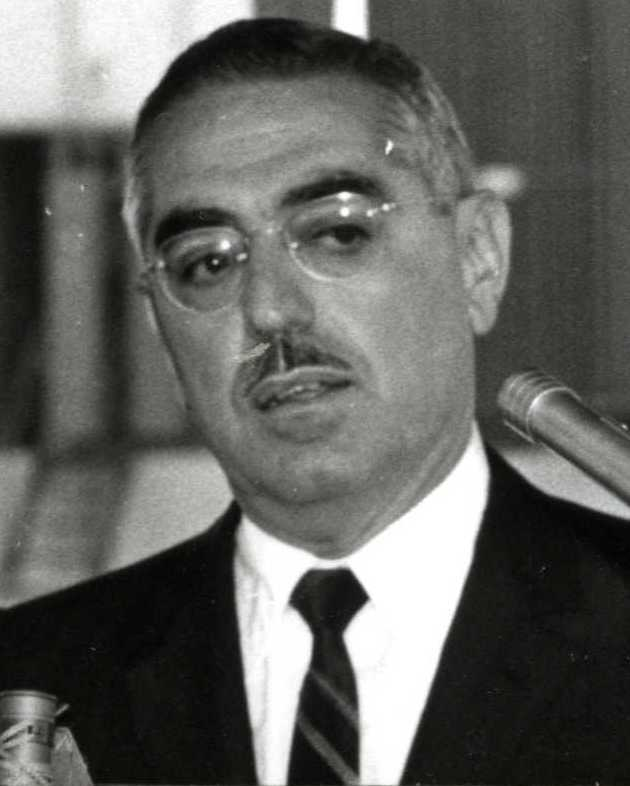

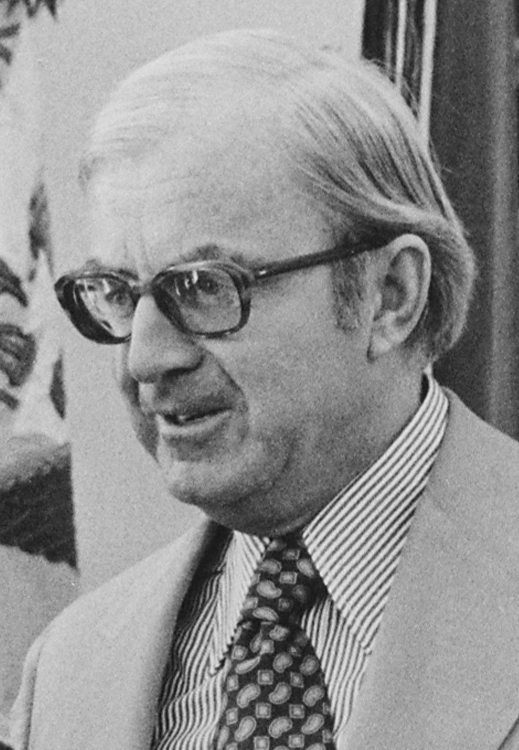
Nominee	John Pastore	John McLaughlin
Party	Democratic	Republican
Popular vote	230,469	107,351
Percentage	67.5%	31.5%
- Pastore: 50–60% 60–70% 70–80% McLaughlin: 50–60%
U.S. senator before election
John Pastore
Democratic
Elected U.S. Senator
John Pastore
Democratic

1970 United States Senate election in Rhode Island
Party	Candidate	Votes	%
Democratic	John O. Pastore (Incumbent)	230,469	67.54
Republican	John McLaughlin	107,351	31.46
Peace and Freedom	David N. Fenton	2,406	0.71
Socialist Workers	Daniel B. Fein	996	0.29
Majority		123,118	36.08
Turnout		341,222	
Democratic hold			

== Tennessee ==
1970 United States Senate election in Tennessee
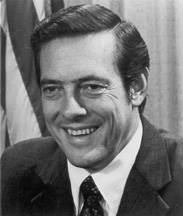

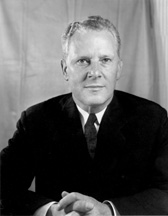
Nominee	Bill Brock	Albert Gore Sr.
Party	Republican	Democratic
Popular vote	562,645	519,858
Percentage	51.29%	47.39%
- County results Brock: 50–60% 60–70% 70–80% 80–90% Gore: 50–60% 60–70% 70–80% 80–90%
U.S. senator before election
Albert Gore Sr.
Democratic
Elected U.S. senator
Bill Brock
Republican

Republican Bill Brock defeated incumbent senator Albert Gore Sr.

1970 United States Senate election in Tennessee
Party	Candidate	Votes	%
Republican	Bill Brock	562,645	51.29
Democratic	Albert Gore Sr. (Incumbent)	519,858	47.39
American Independent	Cecil Pitard	8,691	0.79
Independent	Dan R. East	5,845	0.53
None	Scattering	2	0.00
Majority		42,787	3.90
Turnout		1,097,041	
Republican hold			

== Texas ==
1970 United States Senate election in Texas
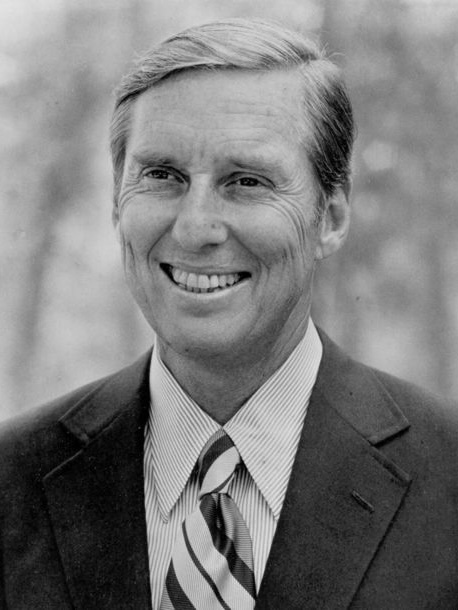

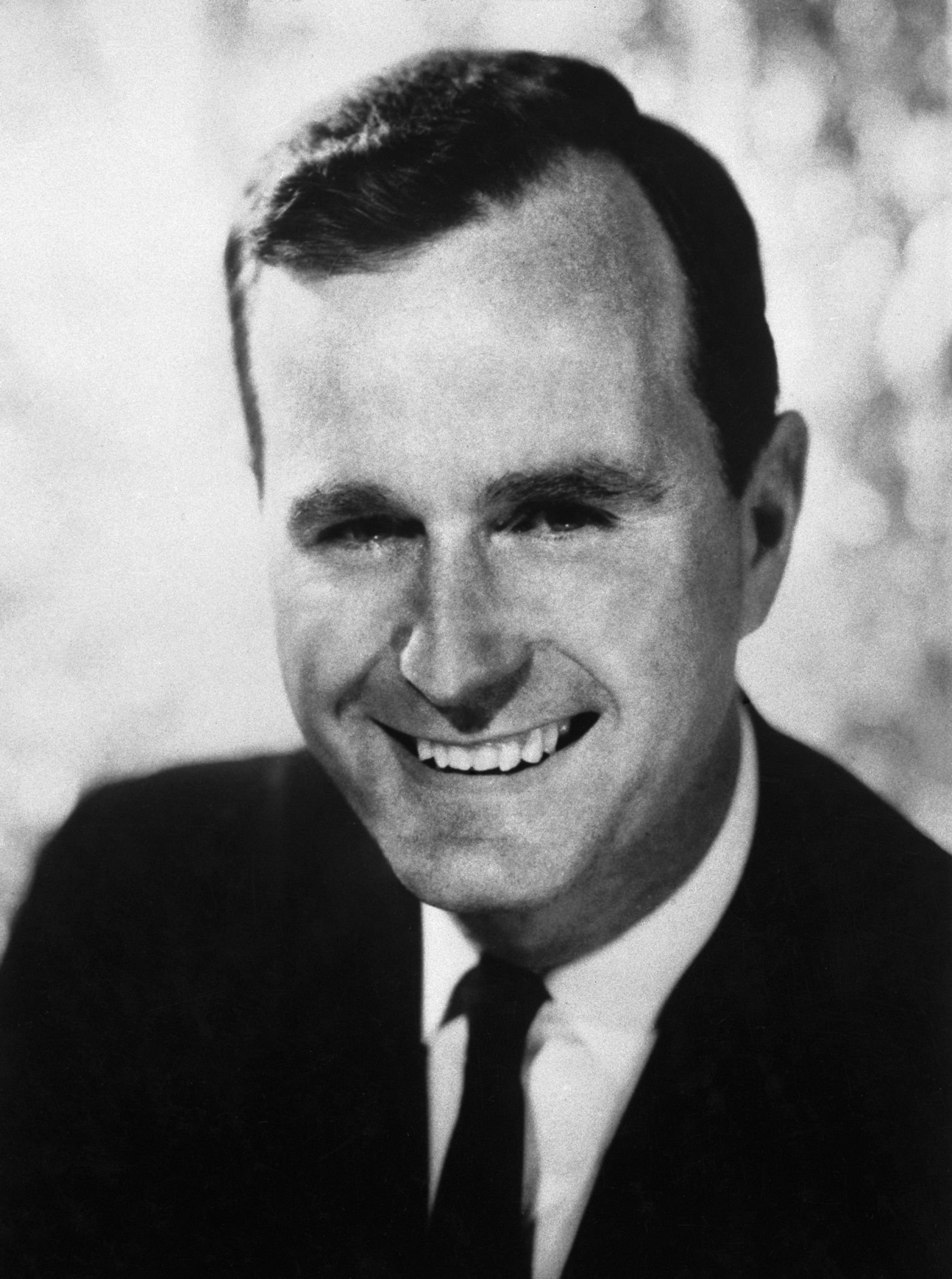
Nominee	Lloyd Bentsen	George H. W. Bush
Party	Democratic	Republican
Popular vote	1,194,069	1,035,794
Percentage	53.3%	46.6%
- Bentsen: 50–60% 60–70% 70–80% 80–90% >90% Bush: 50–60% 60–70%
U.S. senator before election
Ralph Yarborough
Democratic
Elected U.S. senator
Lloyd Bentsen
Democratic

Incumbent Democrat Ralph Yarborough was defeated by former Representative Lloyd Bentsen in the Democratic primary. Bentsen then defeated Representative George H. W. Bush in the general election. When Bush was running for president in 1988, his Democratic opponent, Massachusetts Governor Michael Dukakis, selected Bentsen as his vice presidential running mate.

1970 United States Senate election in Texas
Party	Candidate	Votes	%
Democratic	Lloyd Bentsen	1,226,568	53.34
Republican	George H. W. Bush	1,071,234	46.58
None	Scattering	1,808	0.08
Majority		155,334	6.76
Turnout		2,299,610	
Democratic hold			

== Utah ==
1970 United States Senate election in Utah
- November 3, 1970
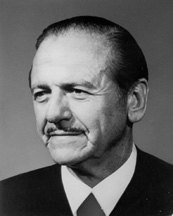

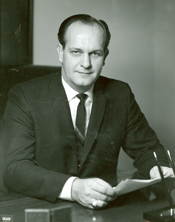
Nominee	Frank Moss	Laurence J. Burton
Party	Democratic	Republican
Popular vote	210,207	159,004
Percentage	56.16%	42.48%
- County results Moss: 50–60% 60–70% 70–80% Burton: 40–50% 50-60% 60-70%
U.S. senator before election
Frank Moss
Democratic
Elected U.S. Senator
Frank Moss
Democratic

1970 United States Senate election in Utah
Party	Candidate	Votes	%
Democratic	Frank Moss (Incumbent)	210,207	56.16
Republican	Laurence J. Burton	159,004	42.48
American Independent	Clyde B. Freeman	5,092	1.36
Majority		51,203	13.68
Turnout		374,303	
Democratic hold			

== Vermont ==
Vermont election
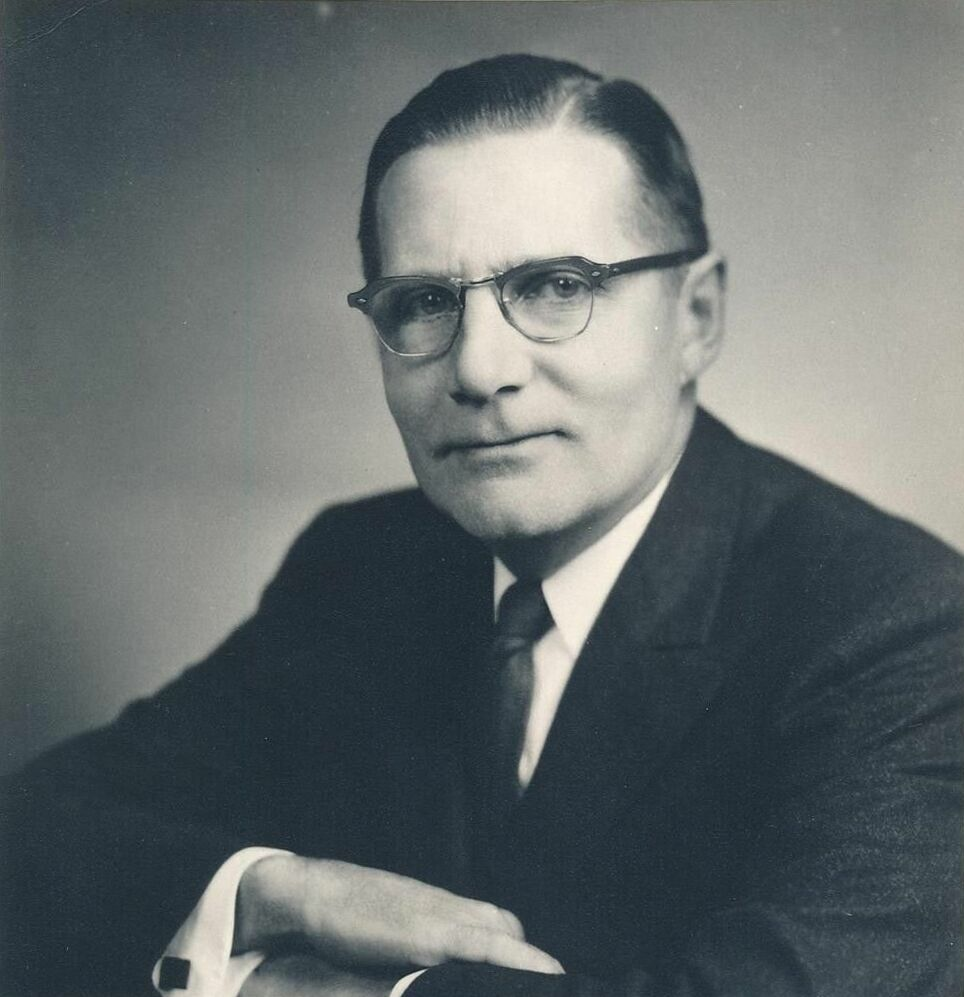

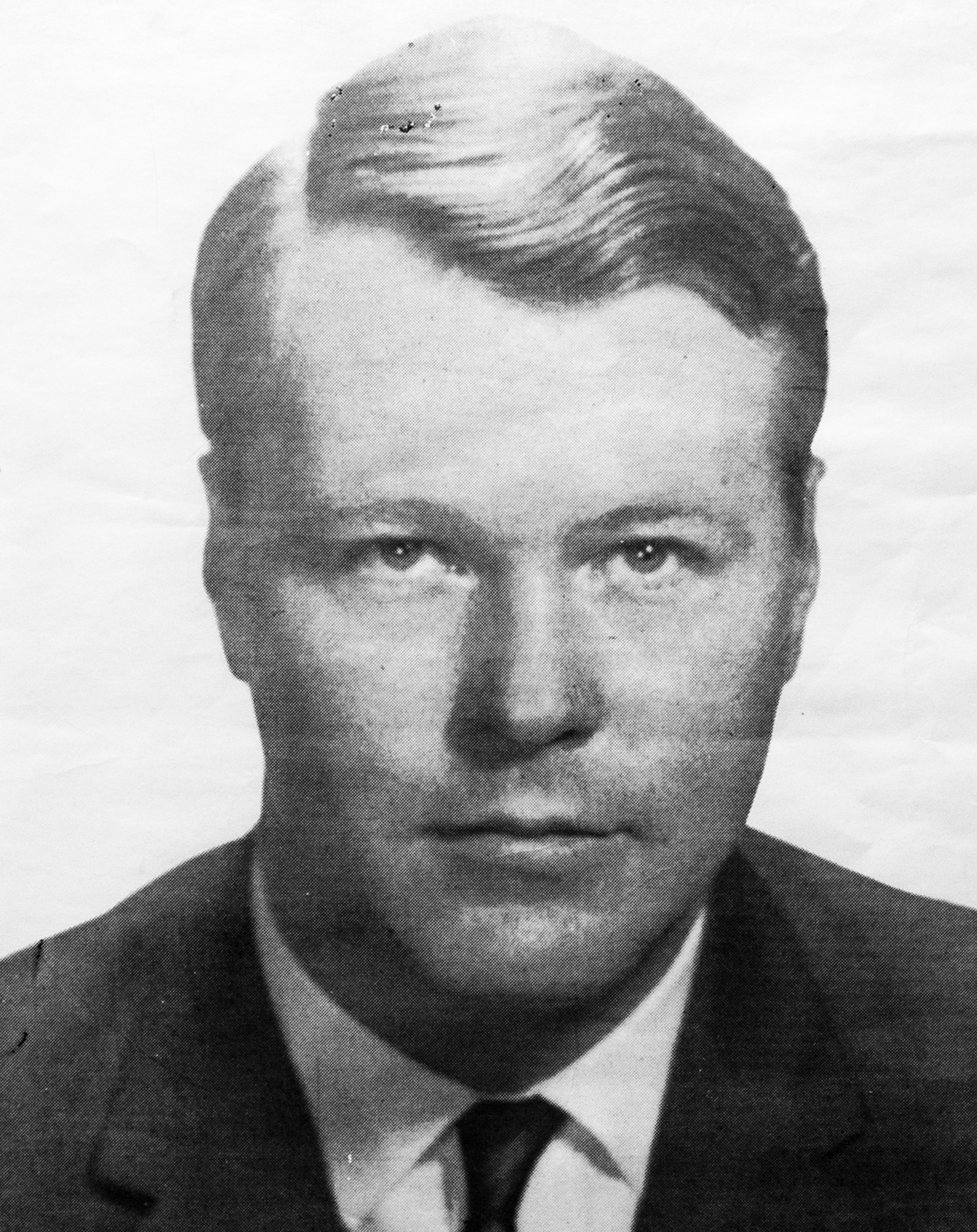
Nominee	Winston L. Prouty	Philip H. Hoff
Party	Republican	Democratic
Popular vote	91,198	62,271
Percentage	58.9%	40.2%
- County results Prouty: 50–60% 60–70% 70–80%
U.S. senator before election
Winston L. Prouty
Republican
Elected U.S. Senator
Winston L. Prouty
Republican

Republican Winston L. Prouty was first elected in 1958, succeeding Republican Ralph Flanders. He was re-elected in 1964 in a realigning period for Vermont politics. Democrat Philip H. Hoff became the state's first Democratic governor since 1853, while William H. Meyer succeeded Prouty in the House of Representatives. Prouty faced a more difficult challenge in 1964 and won with just 53% of the vote. In 1970, Prouty faced Hoff and Meyer in the general election, with Meyer nominated by the Liberty Union party. Prouty prevailed with 59% of the vote to 40% for Hoff and just 1% for Meyer. He would not serve the full term, as he died in 1971 and was succeeded by Republican Robert Stafford.

1970 United States Senate election in Vermont
Party	Candidate	Votes	%
Republican	Winston L. Prouty (Incumbent)	91,198	58.88
Democratic	Philip H. Hoff	62,271	40.20
Liberty Union	William H. Meyer	1,416	0.91
None	Scattering	14	0.01
Majority		28,927	18.68
Turnout		154,899	
Republican hold			

== Virginia ==
Virginia election
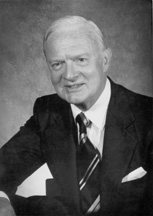

Nominee	Harry F. Byrd Jr.	George Rawlings
Party	Independent	Democratic
Popular vote	506,237	294,582
Percentage	53.5%	31.2%
Nominee	Ray L. Garland
Party	Republican
Popular vote	144,765
Percentage	15.3%
- County and Independent City Results; Byrd: 30-40% 40-50% 50-60% 60-70% 70-80% 80-90% Rawlings: 30-40% 40-50% 50-60% 70-80% Garland: 30-40% 40-50% 50-60%
U.S. senator before election
Harry F. Byrd Jr.
Democratic
Elected U.S. senator
Harry F. Byrd Jr.
Independent

Incumbent Harry F. Byrd Jr. was re-elected to his first full term after winning a race 4 years earlier to finish the remainder of his father's term. He beat George C. Rawlings Jr. (D), a former member of the Virginia House of Delegates, and Ray L. Garland (R), a member of Virginia House of Delegates.

1970 United States Senate election in Virginia
Party	Candidate	Votes	%	±%
Independent	Harry F. Byrd Jr. (Incumbent)	506,237	53.54	+53.54%
Democratic	George Rawlings	294,582	31.15	−22.15%
Republican	Ray L. Garland	144,765	15.31	−22.07%
Write-ins		30	<0.01	−0.02%
Majority		211,655	22.38	+6.46%
Turnout		945,614		
Independent gain from Democratic				

== Washington ==
Washington Election
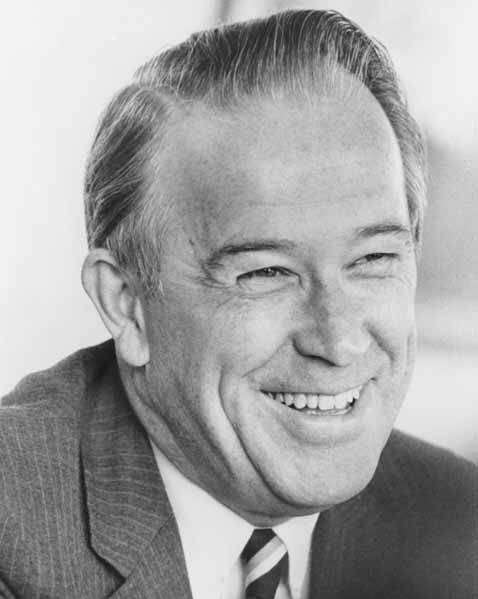

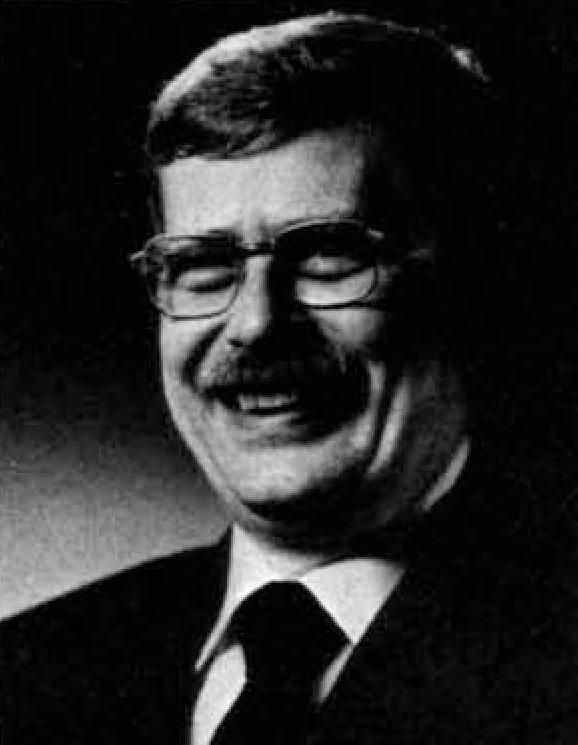
Nominee	Henry M. Jackson	Charles W. Elicker
Party	Democratic	Republican
Popular vote	879,385	170,790
Percentage	82.43%	16.01%
- County results Jackson: 60–70% 70–80% 80–90% >90%
U.S. senator before election
Henry M. Jackson
Democratic
Elected U.S. senator
Henry M. Jackson
Democratic

1970 United States Senate election in Washington
Party	Candidate	Votes	%
Democratic	Henry M. Jackson (Incumbent)	879,385	82.43
Republican	Charles W. Elicker	170,790	16.01
Socialist Workers	Bill Massey	9,255	0.87
Buffalo	Edison S. 'Pinky' Fisk	7,377	0.69
Majority		708,595	66.42
Turnout		1,066,807	
Democratic hold			

== West Virginia ==
1970 United States Senate election in West Virginia
- November 3, 1970
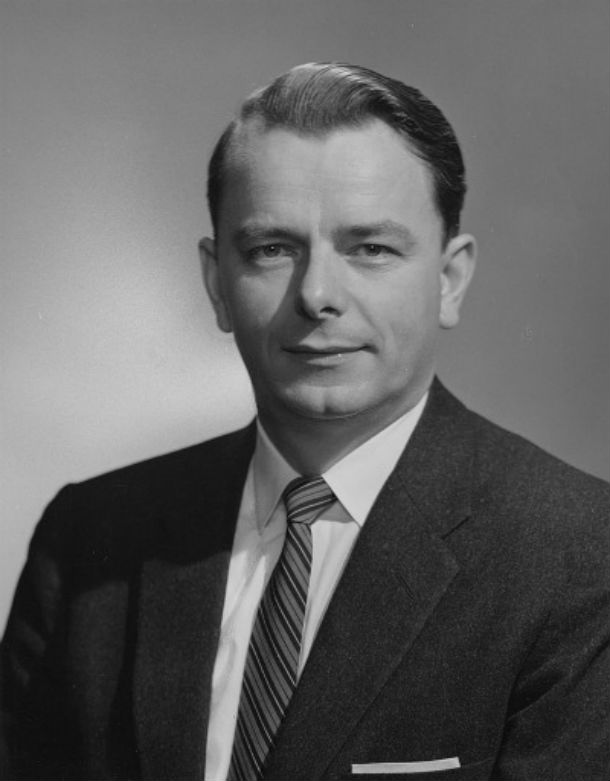

Nominee	Robert Byrd	Elmer Dodson
Party	Democratic	Republican
Popular vote	345,965	99,658
Percentage	77.64%	22.36%
- County results Byrd: 60–70% 70–80% 80–90%
U.S. senator before election
Robert Byrd
Democratic
Elected U.S. Senator
Robert Byrd
Democratic

1970 United States Senate election in West Virginia
Party	Candidate	Votes	%
Democratic	Robert C. Byrd (Incumbent)	345,965	77.64
Republican	Elmer H. Dodson	99,658	22.36
Majority		246,307	54.28
Turnout		445,623	
Democratic hold			

== Wisconsin ==
1970 United States Senate election in Wisconsin
- November 3, 1970
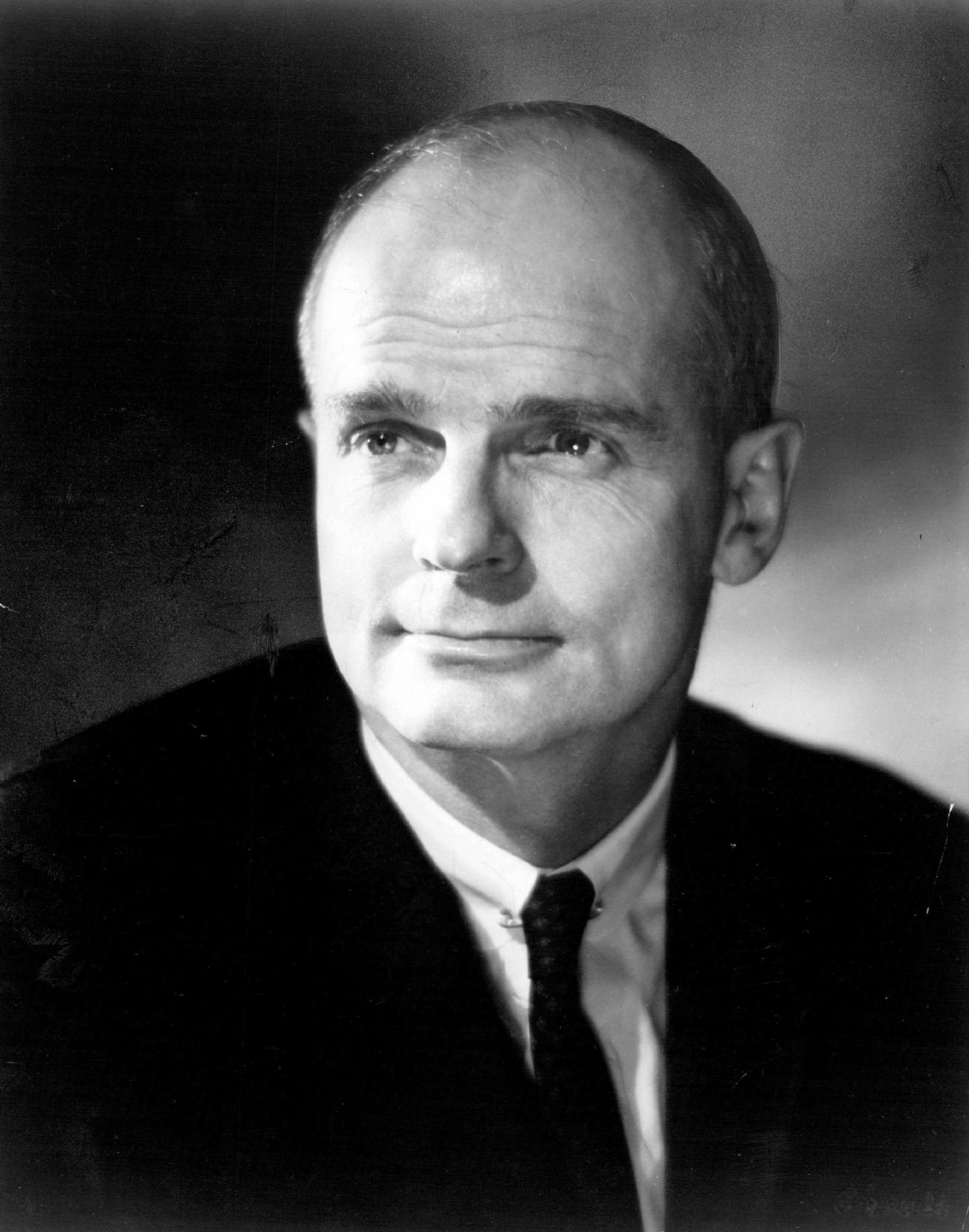

Nominee	William Proxmire	John E. Erickson
Party	Democratic	Republican
Popular vote	948,445	381,297
Percentage	70.83%	28.48%
- County results Proxmire: 50–60% 60–70% 70–80% 80–90%
U.S. senator before election
William Proxmire
Democratic
Elected U.S. Senator
William Proxmire
Democratic

1970 United States Senate election in Wisconsin
Party	Candidate	Votes	%
Democratic	William Proxmire (Incumbent)	948,445	70.83
Republican	John E. Erickson	381,297	28.48
American Independent	Edmond E. Hou-Seye	6,137	0.46
Independent	Elizabeth (Betty) Boardman	2,022	0.15
Socialist Workers	Martha M. Quinn	580	0.04
Socialist Labor	Adolf Wiggert	428	0.03
None	Scattering	58	0.00
Majority		567,148	42.35
Turnout		1,338,967	
Democratic hold			

== Wyoming ==
1970 United States Senate election in Wyoming
- November 3, 1970
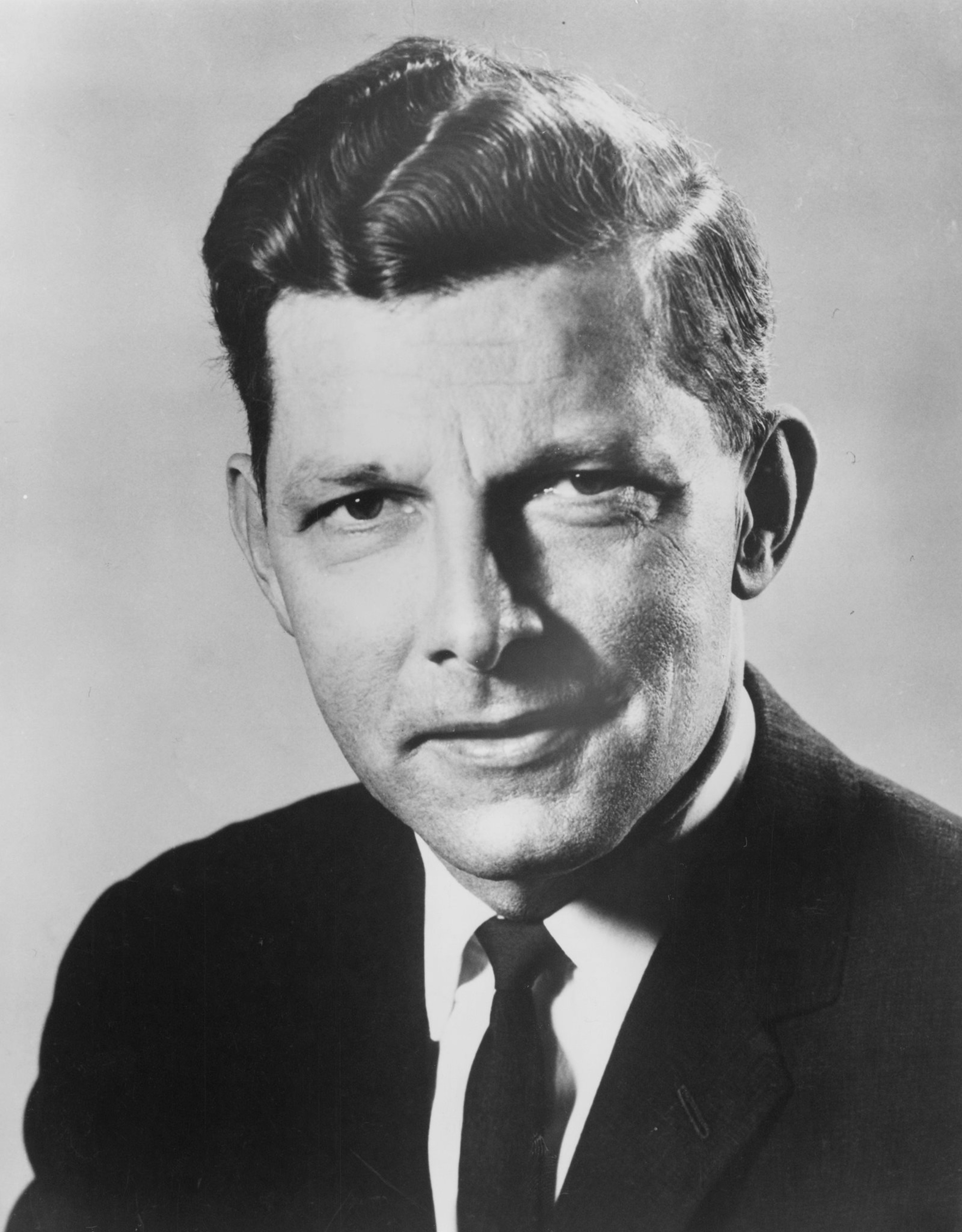

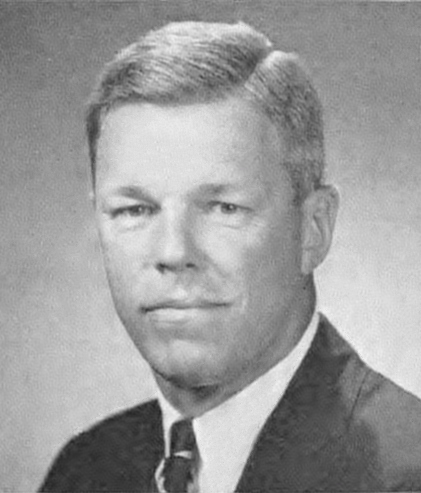
Nominee	Gale W. McGee	John S. Wold
Party	Democratic	Republican
Popular vote	67,207	53,279
Percentage	55.78%	44.22%
- County results McGee: 50–60% 60–70% Wold: 50–60% 60–70%
U.S. senator before election
Gale W. McGee
Democratic
Elected U.S. Senator
Gale W. McGee
Democratic

1970 United States Senate election in Wyoming
Party	Candidate	Votes	%
Democratic	Gale W. McGee (Incumbent)	67,207	55.78
Republican	John S. Wold	53,279	44.22
Majority		13,928	11.56
Turnout		120,486	
Democratic hold			

== See also ==
- 1970 United States elections
  - 1970 United States gubernatorial elections
  - 1970 United States House of Representatives elections
- 91st United States Congress
- 92nd United States Congress
- 1970 in the United States
