= 1970 United States Senate election in New Mexico =

- November 3, 1970
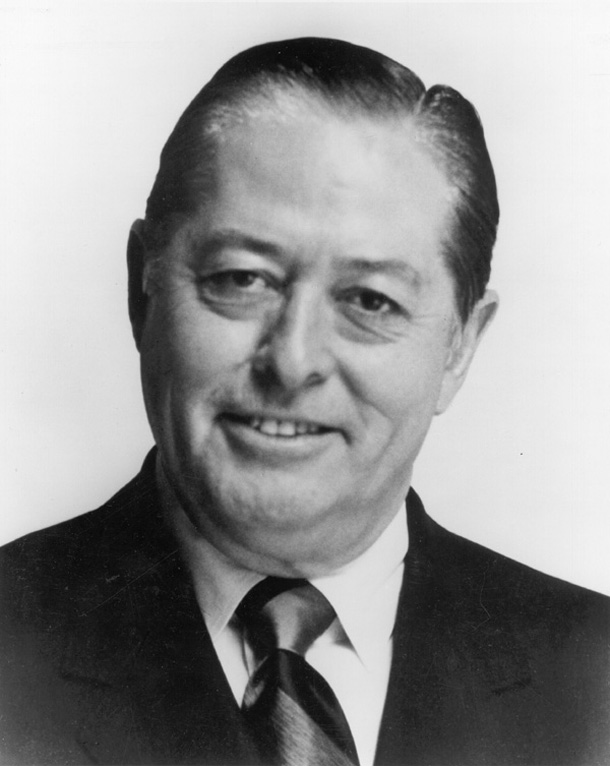

Nominee	Joseph Montoya	Anderson Carter
Party	Democratic	Republican
Popular vote	151,486	135,004
Percentage	52.26%	46.57%
- County results Montoya: 50–60% 60–70% Carter: 40–50% 50–60% 60–70%
U.S. senator before election
Joseph Montoya
Democratic
Elected U.S. Senator
Joseph Montoya
Democratic

The 1970 United States Senate election in New Mexico took place on November 3, 1970. Incumbent Democratic U.S. Senator Joseph Montoya successfully ran for re-election to a second term, defeating Republican Anderson Carter.

== Democratic primary ==
=== Candidates ===
- Joseph Montoya, incumbent U.S. Senator
- Richard B. Edwards

=== Results ===
Democratic primary results
Party	Candidate	Votes	%
Democratic	Joseph Montoya, Incumbent	85,285	73.10
Democratic	Richard B. Edwards	31,381	26.90
Majority		53,904	46.20%
Total votes		116,666	100.00

== Republican primary ==
=== Candidates ===
- Anderson Carter
- David Cargo, Governor of New Mexico
- Harold G. Thompson

=== Results ===
Republican primary results
Party	Candidate	Votes	%
Republican	Anderson Carter	32,122	57.76
Republican	David Cargo	16,951	32.28
Republican	Harold G. Thompson	5,544	9.97
Majority		14,171	25.48%
Total votes		55,617	100.00

== General election ==
=== Results ===
General election results
Party	Candidate	Votes	%
Democratic	Joseph Montoya, Incumbent	151,486	52.26
Republican	Anderson Carter	135,004	46.57
People's Constitutional	William Higgs	3,382	1.17
Majority		16,482	5.69%
Total votes		289,872	100.00
Democratic hold			

== See also ==
- United States Senate elections, 1970
