= Anderson Carter =

American politician (1926–2000)

Member of the New Mexico House of Representatives
- In office 1953–1960

Personal details
- Born: October 10, 1926 Roswell, New Mexico, U.S.
- Died: October 13, 2000 (aged 74)
- Party: Democratic; Republican (1961–???)
- Education: Eastern New Mexico University

Anderson Carter (October 10, 1926 – October 13, 2000) was an American politician. He served as a Democratic member of the New Mexico House of Representatives, but switched parties and was twice the Republican nominee for the United States Senate.

== Life and career ==
Carter was born in Roswell, New Mexico in 1926. He attended Eastern New Mexico University.

He served in the New Mexico House of Representatives from 1953 to 1960 as a Democrat, but later left the Democratic Party and became a Republican. Carter led the Barry Goldwater presidential campaign in New Mexico in 1964.

He ran unsuccessfully for the U.S. Senate twice as the Republican nominee, both times against Democratic incumbents: Clinton Anderson in 1966, and Joseph Montoya in 1970.

Carter died on October 13, 2000, at the age of 74.
