= John Richardson =

John Richardson may refer to:

== Arts ==
- John Richardson (1766–1836), actor who founded the travelling Richardson's Theatre in 1798
- John Richardson (actor) (1934–2021), English actor
- John Richardson (art historian) (1924–2019), Picasso biographer
- John Richardson (author) (1796–1852), Canadian novelist
- John Richardson (drummer) (born 1964), American rock drummer from Illinois
- John Richardson (poet) (1817–1886), English poet
- John Richardson (special effects designer) (born 1946), British designer of visual effects
- John Richardson (born 1947), a.k.a. Jayadev Das, drummer for The Rubettes

== Business and industry ==
- John Richardson (businessman) (c. 1754–1831), Canadian businessman
- John Grubb Richardson (1813–1891), major Irish industrialist who founded the model village of Bessbrook near Newry
- John Wigham Richardson (1837–1908), British shipbuilder on Tyneside
- John Kobina Richardson (1936–2010), Ghanaian industrialist

== Military ==
- John M. Richardson (admiral) (born 1960), American naval admiral, Chief of Naval Operations
- John Soame Richardson (1836–1896), British army Major-General, Commander of the Forces New South Wales
- John Richardson (Australian Army officer) (1880–1954)
- John B. Richardson IV (born 1968), US Army general
- John H. Richardson (CIA officer) (born 1913), senior CIA officer and station chief

== Politics ==
- John Richardson (colonial administrator) (1679–1741), deputy governor of Anguilla
- John Peter Richardson II (1801–1864), governor of South Carolina
- John Richardson (New Zealand politician) (1810–1878), speaker of the New Zealand Legislative Council, 1868–1879
- John Richardson (New South Wales politician) (1810–1888), Australian pastoralist, store keeper and politician
- John S. Richardson (1828–1894), US congressman from South Carolina, 1879–1883
- John Peter Richardson III (1831–1899), governor of South Carolina
- John Richardson (Ontario MPP) (1844–1915), Ontario farmer and politician
- John Richardson (born 1886) (1886–1976), American attorney and political figure
- John Richardson (Canadian MP) (1932–2010), Canadian politician
- John Richardson (Australian politician) (born 1938), member of the Victorian Legislative Assembly
- John G. Richardson (1957–2020), speaker of the Maine House and candidate for governor
- John Richardson Jr. (1921–2014), US Assistant Secretary of State for Educational and Cultural Affairs (1969–1977)

== Religion ==
- John Richardson (bishop of Ardagh) (1580–1654), English bishop of the Church of Ireland
- John Richardson (Quaker) (1667–1753), English Quaker minister and autobiographer
- John Richardson (Archdeacon of Southwark) (1817–1904), Anglican priest
- John Richardson (Archdeacon of Nottingham) (1849–1924), priest in the Church of England
- John Richardson (archbishop of Fredericton) (1868–1938), Anglican Church of Canada bishop
- John Richardson (bishop of Car Nicobar) (1896–1978), Anglican bishop in India, also M.P.
- John Richardson (bishop of Bedford) (born 1937), Church of England bishop
- John Richardson (Dean of Bradford) (born 1950), priest in the Church of England
- John Richardson (Archdeacon of Derby) (1905–1991)
- John Richardson (Archdeacon of Cleveland) (1676–1735)
- John Richardson (dean of Kilmacduagh) (1669–1747)

== Science ==
- John Richardson (translator) (1564–1625), Master of Trinity College, Cambridge, 1615–1625
- John Richardson (orientalist) (1740/1–1795), Oxford editor of A Dictionary; Persian, Arabic and English, 1777
- Sir John Richardson (naturalist) (1787–1865), Arctic explorer and naturalist
- John Richardson (convict) (1797–1882), Australian convict who accompanied several exploring expeditions as botanical collector
- John Richardson (philosopher) (born 1951), professor of philosophy at New York University
- John Henry Richardson (1890–1970), British economics professor
- John M. Richardson (professor) (born 1938), American university professor, system dynamics and Sri Lanka scholar
- John Reginald Richardson (1912–1997), Canadian-American physicist
- John T. Richardson (1923–2022), American academic administrator and priest at DePaul University
- John V. Richardson Jr., American professor of information studies
- John S. Richardson (zoologist), Canadian zoologist and academic

== Sports ==
- John Maunsell Richardson (1846–1912), English cricketer, Member of Parliament and twice winner of the English Grand National
- John Richardson (Derbyshire cricketer) (1856–1940), English cricketer for Derbyshire County Cricket Club
- John Richardson (tennis) (1873–1???), South African Olympic tennis player
- Mick Richardson (John Mettham Richardson, 1874–1920), English footballer active in the 1890s
- John Richardson (Yorkshire cricketer) (1908–1985), English cricketer for Yorkshire County Cricket Club
- John Richardson (South African cricketer) (1935–2020), played for North Eastern Transvaal
- Jock Richardson (1906–1986), Scottish footballer
- John Richardson (American football) (born 1945), played for the Miami Dolphins
- JP Richardson (John Paul Richardson, born 2002), American football wide receiver
- John Richardson (baseball), American baseball player
- John Richardson (footballer, born 1945) (1945–2017), English football player for Derby County and Notts County
- John Richardson (footballer, born 1949) (1949–1984), English football player for Brentford, Fulham and Aldershot
- John Richardson (footballer, born 1966), English football player for Colchester
- John Richardson (rower) (born 1944), Canadian rower who competed in the 1968 Summer Olympics
- John Richardson (rugby union) (1947–2019), Welsh rugby union player
- John Richardson (squash player) (born 1949), English squash player

== Others ==
- John Richardson (judge) (1771–1841), English lawyer and judge in the Court of Common Pleas
- John Richardson, Baron Richardson (1910–2004), British physician

== See also ==
- Jonathan Richardson (disambiguation)
- Jon Richardson (disambiguation)
