= Lewis Pugh Williamson =

American politician (1801–1865)

Member of the North Carolina House of Representatives from the Northampton County district
- In office 1822–1824 Serving with Roderick B. Gary
- Preceded by: Roderick B. Gary and Thomas Peete
- Succeeded by: Roderick B. Gary and Thomas Bynum

Personal details
- Born: April 23, 1801 Northampton County, North Carolina, U.S.
- Died: October 14, 1865 (aged 64) Memphis, Tennessee, U.S.
- Spouse: Mary E. Littlejohn (m. 1824)
- Children: 11
- Education: Yale University
- Occupation: Politician; planter

Lewis Pugh Williamson (April 23, 1801 – October 14, 1865) was an American politician and planter from North Carolina. He later moved to Somerville, Tennessee, to work as a planter.

== Early life ==
Lewis Pugh Williamson was born on April 23, 1801, in Northampton County, North Carolina. He graduated from Yale University in 1821. He was a founder of the Calliopean Society at Yale.

== Career ==
In 1822, Williamson was elected to the North Carolina House of Commons. He represented Northampton County in the House of Commons from 1822 to 1824. In 1827, he moved to Somerville, Tennessee, and remained there until his death.

Williamson was a planter. He was involved in the temperance movement. He also served in the Tennessee Legislature.

== Personal life ==
Williamson married Mary E. Littlejohn, daughter of Anne Maria (née Jones) and Joseph Blount Littlejohn, of North Carolina in 1824. They had 11 children, Joseph A., Mary McCullock, Benjamin W., Martha, Lewis P., Priscilla A., Annie Maria, Sallie B., William L., Margaret Eugenia, and Edward W. He was a Methodist.

Williamson died on October 14, 1865, at the home of his daughter in Memphis.
