= Lucius D. Battle =

American diplomat

Lucius Battle
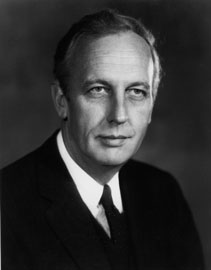

8th Assistant Secretary of State for Near Eastern and South Asian Affairs
- In office April 5, 1967 – September 30, 1968
- President: Lyndon B. Johnson
- Preceded by: Raymond A. Hare
- Succeeded by: Parker T. Hart

United States Ambassador to Egypt
- In office September 22, 1964 – March 5, 1967
- President: Lyndon B. Johnson
- Preceded by: John S. Badeau
- Succeeded by: Richard H. Nolte

2nd Assistant Secretary of State for Educational and Cultural Affairs
- In office June 5, 1962 – August 20, 1964
- Preceded by: Philip H. Coombs
- Succeeded by: Harry McPherson

1st Executive Secretary of the United States Department of State
- In office March 16, 1961 – May 2, 1962
- Succeeded by: William H. Brubeck

Personal details
- Born: Lucius Durham Battle; June 1, 1918 Dawson, Georgia, U.S.
- Died: May 13, 2008 (aged 89) Washington, D.C., U.S.
- Spouse: Betty Davis Battle
- Education: University of Florida
- Profession: Diplomat

Lucius Durham Battle (June 1, 1918 – May 13, 2008) was a career Foreign Service officer who served with distinction in Washington, Europe and Southwest Asia.

== Early life ==
Battle was born on June 1, 1918, in Dawson, Georgia, and his family later moved to Bradenton, Florida when he was 8 years old being one of six children in the family with one dying. He attended Bradenton High School being the sophomore class president, Macohi yearbook editor, playing tennis, swim along with being active in drama playing the violin. He received his undergraduate A.B. (1939) and law (1946) degrees from the University of Florida.

World War II would interrupt his education and initially served at the War Department's civilian personnel office for a year. He spent World War II in the Navy starting in 1943 serving as an associate administrative analyst from 1942-43 being in the Pacific Theatre serving on the staff of COMSERONSOPAC and CINCPAC. Lucius said in an interview while serving in World War II he became interested in international affairs and said he became concerned about the possibility of another world war. Lucius continued to serve in the Navy until being discharged in 1946.

== State Department career ==
After the war, Battle moved to Washington with the goal of joining the foreign service. He had no prior connections and no Ivy league credentials, but with persistence he was finally hired to the Canada desk of the United States Department of State in 1946, during the administration of President Harry S. Truman. A chance encounter with Dean Acheson led to his being elevated to the position of Special Assistant to the Secretary of State. He traveled with Acheson, served as his right-hand man, attended meetings, and saw every piece of paper that entered or left the Secretary's office. Acheson grew quite fond of his "indispensable aide," once noting with a nod toward Battle, that a successful diplomat needs "an assistant with nerves of steel, a sense of purpose, and a Southern accent." The two men would remain close friends for the rest of Acheson's life.

As Acheson's tenure was coming to a close, Battle moved overseas to serve as First Secretary from 1953 to 1955 at the American Embassy in Copenhagen. He would be the embassy's Chief of the Political Section along with being a member of the US Education Foundation which oversaw the Fulbright Program for Denmark starting in 1953. From 1955 to 1956 he would be the Deputy Executive Secretary of the North Atlantic Treaty Organization serving under Secretary General, Lord Ismay before he resigned in 1956 from the Foreign Service to serve as the Vice President of Colonial Williamsburg which he did until 1964.

After the election of President John F. Kennedy in 1960, Battle returned to Washington to rejoin the State Department as its first Executive Secretary being appointed on March 16, 1961 serving until May 2, 1962).

He would also be a member of the United States delegation to the Treaty of San Francisco, to the Council on Foreign Ministers in 1949, several sessions of the United Nations General Assembly, North Atlantic Council and chaired the United States delegation for UNESCO during one year.

=== Assistant Secretary of State for Education and Culture ===
After serving as the Executive Secretary, he would be appointed on May 29, 1962 as the United States Assistant Secretary of State for Education and Culture beginning his service on June 5. He would leave his position on August 20, 1964. One of the first decisions done by Battle would be to carry out a planned reorganization of the Bureau of Educational and Cultural Affairs abolishing the director position putting the Assistant Secretary in charge. He would help to coordinate cultural events in Washington and worked with Senator J. William Fulbright on the Fulbright Scholars program.

=== Ambassador to Egypt ===
Battle would be appointed as the United States Ambassador to Egypt on July 31, 1964 and presented his credentials on September 22. During an interview Battle said that he did not have any interest in serving abroad when he was approached about being an ambassador to Egypt but did end up taking it anyways. Prior to being appointed he did not have any previous experience in the Middle East but while serving as the Assistant Secretary of State for Educational and Cultural Affairs he did try to secure approval from Congress for projects such as Abu Simbel.

In Cairo, he faced a number of challenges. One was including an attack on the recently dedicated JFK Library, which was burned to the ground by a group of students protesting U.S. policies in the Congo on Thanksgiving Day in 1964, specifically about American support of Moïse Tshombe who was leading Katangan rebels with the Egyptian police standing by and not intervening with the library being burned down. Battle would ask Nassar for an apology.

Later on December 18 that year, a Texas oilman named John Mecom who was friends with President Johnson and one of his biggest financial backers had his plane shot down which the Egyptians said was by accident. Battle responded to Egyptian President Gamal Abdel Nasser saying that "because first you burn his libraries, then you kill his friends." that the country would not be receiving aid in response. At the time of the incident Battle was watching a play at Cairo's American University and learned about it learned about it only when he got to his home in Cairo. As President Nassar was worried food aid may not come as he sent the Minister of Supply, Ramsey Stino to meet with which took place a few hours after he had returned from the site of the wreckage. Battle was angry and distraught over the crash with Stino offering him orange juice followed by coffee to calm him down he refused saying he did not feel he could talk about it but thought the food program would make it. Battle was effective and well regarded by his Egyptian counterparts, despite increasing tensions between Gamal Abdel Nasser and U.S. officials.

=== Assistant Secretary of State for the Near East and North Africa ===
On March 5, 1967, Battle left Egypt to return to Washington to take up the position of Assistant Secretary of State for the Near East and North Africa. (He has the rare distinction among Foreign Service officers of having held the position of Assistant Secretary twice.) Within weeks, Israel attacked Egypt and the Six-Day War began. During the Six-Day War, Israeli aerial and naval forces attacked the USS Liberty as she was in international waters. The Israeli government claimed the attack was a case of mistaken identity. Survivors of the attack were ordered to not discuss the attack with anyone, including their families. Battle described the attack as “incomprehensible” and observed that “We failed to let it all come out publicly at the time. We really ignored it for all practical purposes, and we shouldn’t have…Most of us knew that they were guilty of a deliberate attack.” These comments have lent credibility to the theory that the attack was deliberate.

== Later career ==
In 1968, Battle resigned from the Foreign Service to work as Vice President of Communications Satellite Corporation (COMSAT).

Battle turned down two Ambassadorial posts: to Vietnam in the Johnson administration and to Iran in 1977, thereby avoiding captivity during the Iran hostage crisis.

He became president of the Middle East Institute, from June 1973 to 1975 before returning to Comsat until 1980. Next he started the Foreign Policy Institute at the Johns Hopkins School of Advanced International Studies in 1980, and finished his career as president of the Middle East Institute from 1986 until his retirement in 1990.

In 1984, Ambassador Battle was awarded the Foreign Service Cup, an award given annually to a retired Foreign Service officer by Diplomatic and Consular Officers, Retired.

== Personal life ==
Lucius was known to enjoy reading.

His wife, Betty Davis Battle (1924–2004), was a Stanford-educated political scientist, attorney, and arts foundation official at the Woodward Foundation, which placed works by American artists in embassies around the world.

== Affiliations ==
Battle served on the board of directors of a number of institutions, including:

- Trustee of the John F. Kennedy Center for the Performing Arts
- Trustee, Washington Gallery of Modern Art
- President of the American Foreign Service Association
- Vice Chairman of Meridian House International
- Chairman of Governing Board at St. Albans School
- Member of the Chapter of the Washington National Cathedral
- President of Bacon House Foundation
- Trustee of the George C. Marshall Foundation
- Director of the Foreign Policy Association and the World Affairs Council
- National Board of the Smithsonian Associates
- Board of Governors of the Metropolitan Club
- American Academy of Diplomacy
- First chairman of the Johns Hopkins Foreign Policy Institute
- Trustee of the American University in Cairo
- Chairman of the Visiting Committee for the Center for Middle Eastern Studies of Harvard College
- Member of the Advisory Board of the Center for Contemporary Arab Studies of Georgetown University
- Advisory Committee, American Near East Refugee Aid

== Writings ==
- Communications and the Economy: Communications and Peace, by Lucius D. Battle, 1975
- "Peace: Inshallah", article in Foreign Policy, No. 14, Spring 1974.
- Reminiscences of Lucius D. Battle, Oral History. 51 pp., 1974

Government offices
Preceded by Philip Hall Coombs	Assistant Secretary of State for Educational and Cultural Affairs; June 5, 1962 – August 20, 1964	Succeeded by Harry McPherson
Preceded by Raymond A. Hare	Assistant Secretary of State for Near Eastern and South Asian Affairs; April 5, 1967 – September 30, 1968	Succeeded by Parker T. Hart
Preceded by John S. Badeau	United States Ambassador to Egypt; September 22, 1964 – March 5, 1967	Succeeded by Richard H. Nolte
