= Museum education =

Field devoted to developing the education role of museums

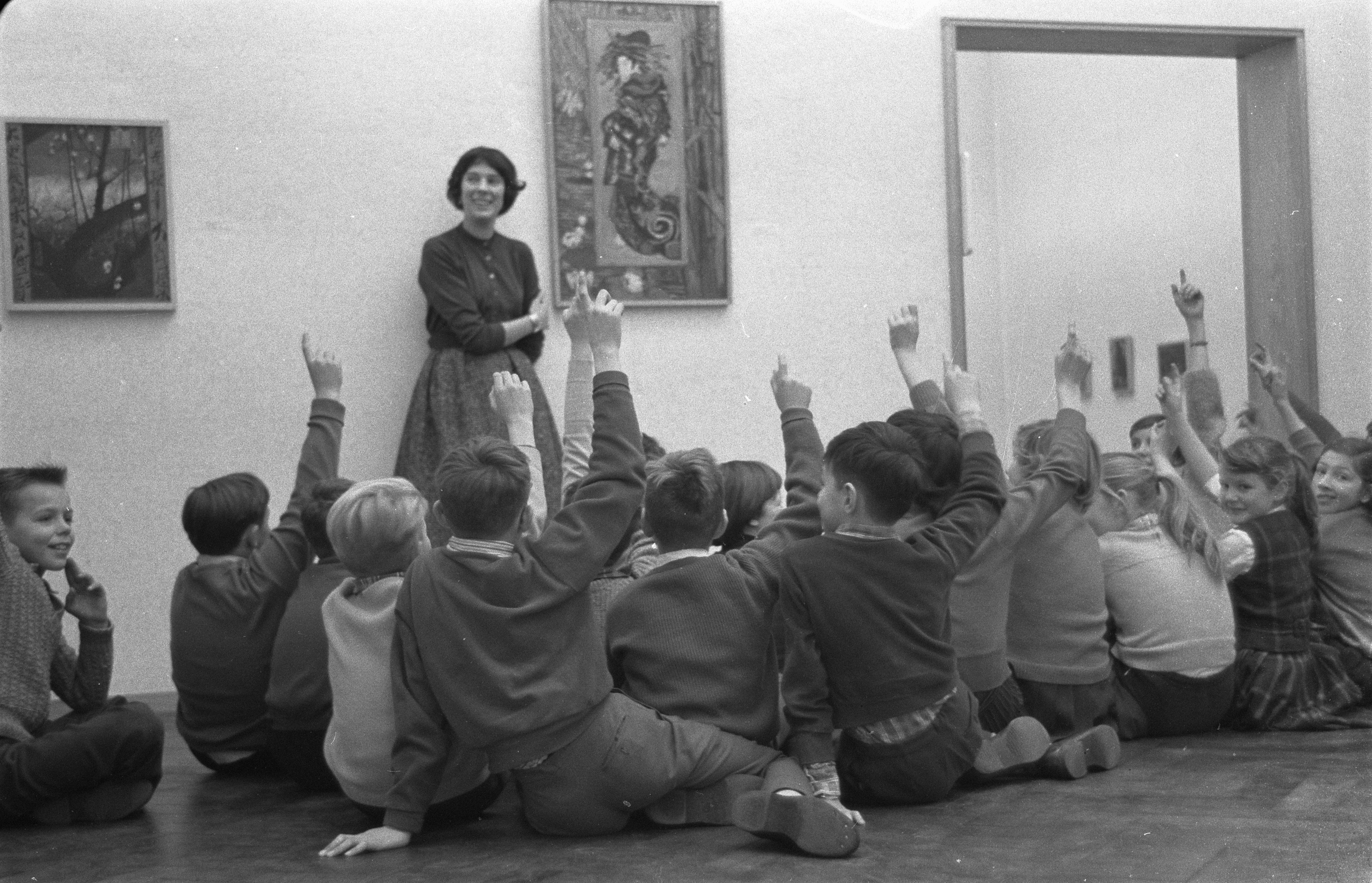
Children during a museum lesson at the Stedelijk Museum Amsterdam in 1960

Museum education is a specialized field devoted to developing and strengthening the education role of informal education spaces and institutions such as museums.

In a critical report called Excellence and Equity published in 1992 by the American Association of Museums, the educational role of museums was identified as the core to museums' service to the public. As museum education has developed as a field of study and interest in its own right, efforts have been made to record its history and to establish a research agenda to strengthen its position as a discipline in the wider work of museums.

Educational concepts have grown from informal structures to dedicated departments in museum spaces, placing greater importance on learning and engagement strategies. Educators in museum spaces were originally docents, serving as guides before these institutions restructured their education systems to include specific paid positions. Museum education departments are also responsible for the development of different tools and strategies to adapt to a wide range of individuals and their various needs in museum spaces.

== Description ==
Museum education falls under the broad category of informal education. Informal education is defined as "...any organized educational activity outside the established formal system—whether operating separately or as an important feature of some broader activity—that is intended to serve identifiable learning clienteles and learning objective".

This definition was later broadened to include the idea that non-formal education is any systematic educative activity, organized outside from the official framework to facilitate educative experiences for all people, regardless of age, genre, nationality, social, economic or health situation.

Informal education expands the definition of educational spaces to include learning that occurs in places like the home, national parks, zoos, and museums. Museum education has been set apart from other informal education largely due to education made available to museum educators and the specific learning objectives of the museums themselves.

== History ==
=== Beginnings in art museums of the United States ===
At the turn of the twentieth century, art museums were very new institutions to the average visitor, who was seen wandering with no clear direction through the galleries, and with no clear idea on how to appreciate and study the exhibitions. In 1906, architect J. Randolph Coolidge Jr. was appointed the temporary director of the Boston Museum of Fine Arts. He experimented with a guiding system in the galleries, to help visitors orient themselves throughout their walk across the exhibitions.

=== Art Museum Volunteers as Museum Educators ===
An article published in the June bulletin of the Museum of Fine Arts, Boston in 1906 features one of the first uses of the term docent and the description of its functions. It said,

"It has been proposed to the Trustees to consider the permanent appointment of one or more persons of intelligence and education who could act as intermediaries between Curators and the many who would be glad to avail themselves of trained instruction in our galleries. Through these docents, as it has been proposed to call them, the heads of departments could instruct many more persons than it would be possible for them to accompany through the galleries; and illustrated lectures upon the collections prepared in the departments might be regularly given by these specially qualified aids both in the Museum and in the classrooms of neighboring schools and colleges."

After the conclusion of WWII, art museums' priorities shifted once again to an increased focus on education. Schools across the country began making field trips to museums for educational programs, and at the same time a greater emphasis was being placed on collecting and volunteerism. This emphasis on volunteerism, combined with the increase in student attendance, led to a greater level of importance given to museum education and museum educators. By 1946, museum leaders like Otto Wittmann, the then associate director at the Toledo Museum of Art, were advocating for the use of volunteers (docents), and the development of museum educator training, for expanding education programs. Speaking on his conceptualization of the perfect museum volunteer educator candidate, Wittmann said,

“She is a married woman, thirty to thirty-five years old, with one or two children in school, and a husband in an executive position. She has attended exhibitions quite regularly for several years and has for some time brought her children to your classes and special events. She has some years of college education but is not always a graduate. She seldom has formal training related to her volunteer job but may have developed useful skills in other activities. She works well with her hands, likes people (especially children), and is at ease and talks easily with them. Most important — she has a curiosity, imagination, and enthusiasm, and she believes in the importance of your organization to the community”

=== WWII impacts on informal education ===
In 1968, in his first report as the first Assistant Secretary of State for Education and Culture, Philip H. Coombs emphasized the increment of the educative needs of the world's population after World War II. In it, he mentions the diversity of informal education activities that constitute, or should constitute, an important complement to formal education to the total educational efforts of any country. To Coombs, informal education had the potential to satisfy the learning demands of individuals and collectivities because unlike the more rigid traditional education, informal education is flexible and takes into consideration local culture, economy and society, which counteracts the tendency of developing countries to imitate education models of developed countries.

Throughout his career, Coombs encouraged and impulsed the professional development of people responsible of non-formal education, which will be determining for the development and professionalization of the educative areas in institutions devoted to non-formal education.

=== Museum education workers ===
A 2019 demographic study demonstrated a long-standing homogeneity among art museum educators, who tend to be White, heterosexual, cisgender women between the ages of 26-40 with spouses but without care-taking responsibilities. These demographics point to historical conditions of low pay and pervasiveness of unpaid internships, which limit participation to those with access to other sources of income. Unpaid internships have become prerequisites to securing future employment in the field, as they offer opportunities for networking and demonstrating one's employability, creating a “cruel paradox” in the field in which paid employment is restricted to those with the economic resources to contribute unpaid labor.

Due to changes in the workforce throughout the decades, the ideal docent reflects an outdated model of a museum educator. Institutions began disbanding docent programs in favour of introducing more diversity and paid career opportunities in the field. In 2021, the Art Institute of Chicago was involved in a dispute surrounding the disbanding of its docent program in order to do just that and emphasise its values of promoting diverse perspectives.

Conversations between industry professionals also found that, due to docents being primarily long-term volunteers lacking formal training in the field, their knowledge was at times outdated or inaccurate, and failed to align with modern practices in fast-changing environments. In 2015, The Wall Street Journal published an article titled “Docents Gone Wild” detailing testimonies from museum visitors who experienced inappropriate behaviour from docents aged over 65. With claims such as “docents flouting their supervisors, misstating facts, touching the art, and other infractions.”

The role and title of docent was retired and replaced with diverse paid positions in education departments under a variety of names such as interpreters, animators, facilitators, or guides, among others, which function similarly to a traditional docent, but with an increase in specialised training in the field and knowledge of their respective institutions' artifacts.

Changes in how people learn also played a role in the restructuring of many museums' educational formats to better align with modern learning strategies. The phrase “From Sage on the Stage to Guide on the Side,” coined by Alison King, illustrates this shift in mindset from the perspective of both educators in and outside of traditional educational institutions. Traditional museum education relied on the lecture-style format, while modern interpretation emphasises participatory and engaging learning processes.

The titles of museum educators are important for two reasons. One reason is that they evidence the field's struggle for vocabulary to define what it is museum educators do. The second reason is that these job titles may reflect differences in the positions themselves, and growing differences in the roles of education departments across museums. Including Director/Chair of Education, Director of Education and Public Programs, Curator of Education, Education and Interpretation Supervisor, Head of Interpretation and Participatory Experiences, Director of Education and Curator of Public Practices, etc.

There is a growing number of graduate programs in museum education, including: a Master's and PhD in Arts Administration, Education, & Policy from Ohio State University; a Master's from Bank Street College of Education; and a Master's from Tufts University in Museum Studies; and others.

=== Effects of COVID-19 Pandemic ===
In 2020, The American Alliance of Museum and Wilkening Consulting released a survey snap shot of COVID-19 Impact on United States Museums

The survey includes information on museum closures, visitation numbers, furloughs and lost revenue. The staff positions most affected by layoffs and furloughs due to COVID19 at the surveyed institutions were Guest Services/Admissions/Front of House/Retail (68%) followed by Education (40%). 67% of surveyed museums reported needing to cut back on education, programming, and other public service due to budget shortfalls and/or staff reductions.

Due to the COVID-19 pandemic, almost 95% of museums worldwide had to close their doors for at least part of 2020. The widespread impact of COVID-19 is further illustrated by the fact that 99% of arts organizations of all kinds in the U.S. had to cancel events in 2020. Due to these forced closures and out of the interest of abiding by pandemic safety guidelines, museums began turning to the digital realm for programming and educational efforts. Many museums created or added onto virtual education programs, including; Zoom or video-conferenced events, new social media channels and groups, take-home art activities, virtual tours, and more, which continue to be utilised ressources.

== Accessibility ==
Museum education departments are responsible for creating programming aimed at visitors of all ages. They are also responsible for adapting them to a wide range of audiences’ needs. They are tasked with developing specific tools and strategies to improve the experiences of individuals with particular or special needs, or physical impairments, such as low-vision or blindness.

Certain museums have implemented quiet hours, periods in which the stimuli are lowered, there is a reduced number of visitors, more quiet spaces, among other possible accommodations to promote wellness and create a comfortable and safe space for neurodivergent visitors and all those who prefer a peaceful visit. Museums may also provide access to sensory and tactile items to support and improve museum experiences for neurodiverse visitors.

There are specialised programs developed in order to support blind or low-vision individuals in museums. These programs allow for the visitors to experience the museum through different senses, such as touch or smell. They make use of different tactile tools such as three dimensional models, braille, orientation tools, among others. They may also offer more detailed visual descriptions.

In 2024, the “Accessible Museums for Persons with Disabilities" project launched in China, in association with the United Nations Partnership on the Rights of Persons with Disabilities (UNPRPD). The project aims to make museums more accessible and improve the experience for all visitors, as well as raise awareness of the importance of these practices and encourage other museums to improve their own accessibility measures and resources globally.

== Theory & Practice ==
Museum pedagogy is influenced by constructivism, postmodernism, and critical multiculturalism. Museum educators employ different teaching strategies, including Visual Thinking Strategies (VTS) and the dialogical model of art interpretation. This can culminate into many different end products including brightly colored museum displays, interactive display elements, and informational books and pamphlets. Other pedagogical strategies include Feldman's Model of Art Criticism, aesthetic scanning, and FTC Palette

== Publications ==
- Excellence in Practice: Museum Education Principles and Standards was developed by the Education Committee of the American Association of Museums to help guide and inform the practice of Museum Education.
- The Journal of Museum Education (JME) is a journal covering the theory, training and practice of the museum education field from the Museum Education Roundtable. Articles are written by museum, education, and research professionals.
- The Museum Education Monitor was a monthly email newsletter that tracked and recorded research and resources in museum education worldwide. Publication of the Museum Education Monitor ended in 2015.
- Art Museum Teaching is a digitally published resource and collaborative online forum for reflecting on issues of teaching, learning, and experimental practice in the field of art museum education.
- Viewfinder: Reflecting on Museum Education is a peer-reviewed digital publication from the National Art Education Association.
- Studies in Art Education is a quarterly journal that reports quantitative, qualitative, historical, and philosophical research in art education.
- Journal of Cultural Research in Art Education (jCRAE) is an annual publication of the United States Society for Education through Art and is completely accessible online.

== Professional Organizations ==
The Museum Education Division of the National Art Education Association (NAEA) has over 620 members across North America, working through regional representatives and task forces. The division also hosts a Museum Education Preconvention before the NAEA annual conference.

The Museum Education Roundtable provides scholarship and professional learning for museum educators through regional networks and producing the publication The Journal of Museum Education.

The American Alliance of Museums (AAM) and the International Council of Museums (ICOM) are both open for membership to museum professionals. AAM and ICOM each maintain codes of ethics for museums, which detail expectations for professional conduct.

== See also ==
- Biographical museum
- Exhibit design
- International Museum Day
- Museology
- Museums
- Art education
- Category:Art museums and galleries in the United States by state or territory
