= Leah Libresco Sargeant =

American writer and policy analyst

Leah Libresco Sargeant is an American writer and journalist whose work focuses on religion, feminism, family policy, and social dependence. She is the author of Arriving at Amen (2017), Building the Benedict Option (2018), and The Dignity of Dependence: A Feminist Manifesto (2025).

Sargeant currently works as editorial director at the Institute for Progress. She previously worked as a senior policy analyst at the Niskanen Center. She is also known for her independent online writing projects, including the Substack newsletter Other Feminisms.

== Early life and conversion to Catholicism ==
Sargeant was raised on Long Island, New York, in a nonreligious household and has described herself as an atheist during her adolescence and early adulthood. Her parents were academics involved in social justice causes; her mother was from a Jewish background and her father a Catholic background.

She attended Yale University, where she earned a Bachelor of Arts degree in political science in 2011. She then worked for the Center for Applied Rationality in California.

In 2012, while writing publicly as an atheist blogger, Libresco Sargeant converted to Roman Catholicism. She was received into the Catholic Church on November 18, 2012, a date she documented in a contemporaneous blog post.

== Arriving at Amen and Building the Benedict Option ==
Sargeant's first book, Arriving at Amen: Seven Catholic Prayers That Even I Can Offer (2017), explores traditional Catholic prayer practices through the perspective of an adult convert.

Her second book, Building the Benedict Option: A Guide to Gathering Two or Three Together in His Name (2018), provided practical guidance for forming small Christian communities and responding to social fragmentation. The book engaged with wider debates surrounding the "Benedict Option" concept in contemporary Christian discourse.

In 2019, Libresco Sargeant further addressed these themes in her essay "Fear and the Benedict Option", published by First Things.

== Continued online journalism and commentary ==
Sargeant has maintained a diverse writing career across journalism, nonprofit policy work, and independent publishing. FiveThirtyEight lists her as a former news writer for the site, and the Niskanen Center credits her work with a focus on family economic security and caregiving policy.

She publishes the Substack newsletter Other Feminisms, which examines feminist theory, dependency, and care from a perspective critical of autonomy-centered frameworks. She also runs Tiny Book Club, a Substack-based reading project centered on short works and essays.

Sargeant contributed to the Breaking Ground project, a collaborative writing initiative launched during the COVID-19 pandemic that encouraged writers to respond with intellectual and moral sensitivity to the social disruptions caused by the crisis.

She has also participated in politics-adjacent civic organizations. Sargeant serves on the Board of Advisors of the American Solidarity Party, and has appeared in party programming, including a keynote address released publicly by the party. She also worked for the organization Braver Angels facilitating college campus debates.

In 2025, Sergeant argued that anti-abortion laws were not at fault for the deaths of several women that received significant attention during the 2024 election cycle.

Sargeant has contributed commentary and opinion pieces to Deseret News.

== The Dignity of Dependence and New York Times podcast debate ==
In 2025, the University of Notre Dame Press published The Dignity of Dependence: A Feminist Manifesto, in which Libresco Sargeant argues for social recognition of human dependency, caregiving labor, and vulnerability as central rather than marginal features of human life.

The book received attention from mainstream and religious media. Christianity Today named The Dignity of Dependence one of its Books of the Year in 2025. It was also reviewed by The Washington Post.

In November 2025, Libresco Sargeant appeared on Interesting Times with Ross Douthat, a podcast associated with The New York Times, in an episode framed as a debate with Helen Andrews about feminism, workplace norms, and dependency. The episode generated commentary in outlets including The Guardian and Vanity Fair.

== Personal life ==
Libresco Sargeant is married to Alexi Sargeant, a writer and creative professional. She has written and spoken publicly about experiences related to infertility, pregnancy loss, and motherhood, particularly in Catholic media contexts.

Her official biography states that she lives in Maryland with her husband and children.

== Works ==
- Arriving at Amen: Seven Catholic Prayers That Even I Can Offer (2017)
- Building the Benedict Option: A Guide to Gathering Two or Three Together in His Name (2018)
- The Dignity of Dependence: A Feminist Manifesto (2025)
