= Larry E. Temple =

American lawyer

Larry Temple

White House Counsel
- In office October 26, 1967 – January 20, 1969
- President: Lyndon B. Johnson
- Preceded by: Harry McPherson
- Succeeded by: John Ehrlichman

Personal details
- Born: December 26, 1935 (age 90) Plainview, Texas, U.S.
- Party: Democratic
- Education: University of Texas, Austin (BA, LLB)

Larry Eugene Temple (born December 26, 1935) is an American attorney who served as the White House Counsel to President Lyndon B. Johnson from 1967 to 1969. From 1963 to 1967, he was the Executive Assistant to Texas Governor John Connally.

In 1957, Temple graduated with a Bachelor of Business Administration degree from the University of Texas. In 1959, he earned a LL.B. degree from the University of Texas School of Law, and graduated Order of the Coif. From 1959 to 1960, he was a law clerk to U.S. Supreme Court Justice Tom C. Clark.

Currently, Temple is chairman of the board of trustees of the LBJ Foundation. Together with his wife Louann Atkins Temple, and members of his family, he works closely with University of Texas students who have been awarded the Larry Temple Scholarship, an award endowed by The University of Texas System Board of Regents in 1990.

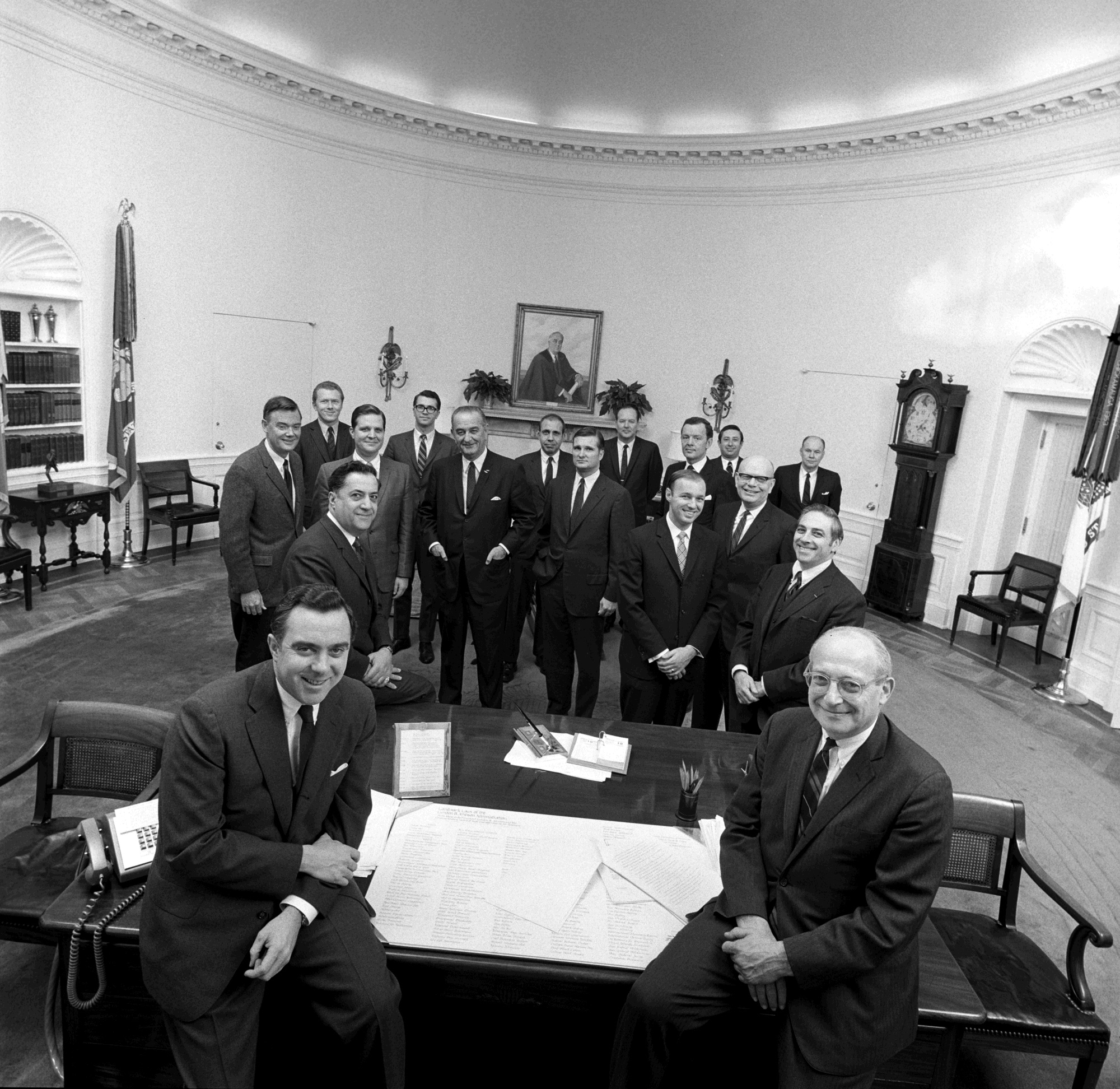
President Johnson posing with staff 1969. Larry Temple standing 2nd row, 2nd from left.

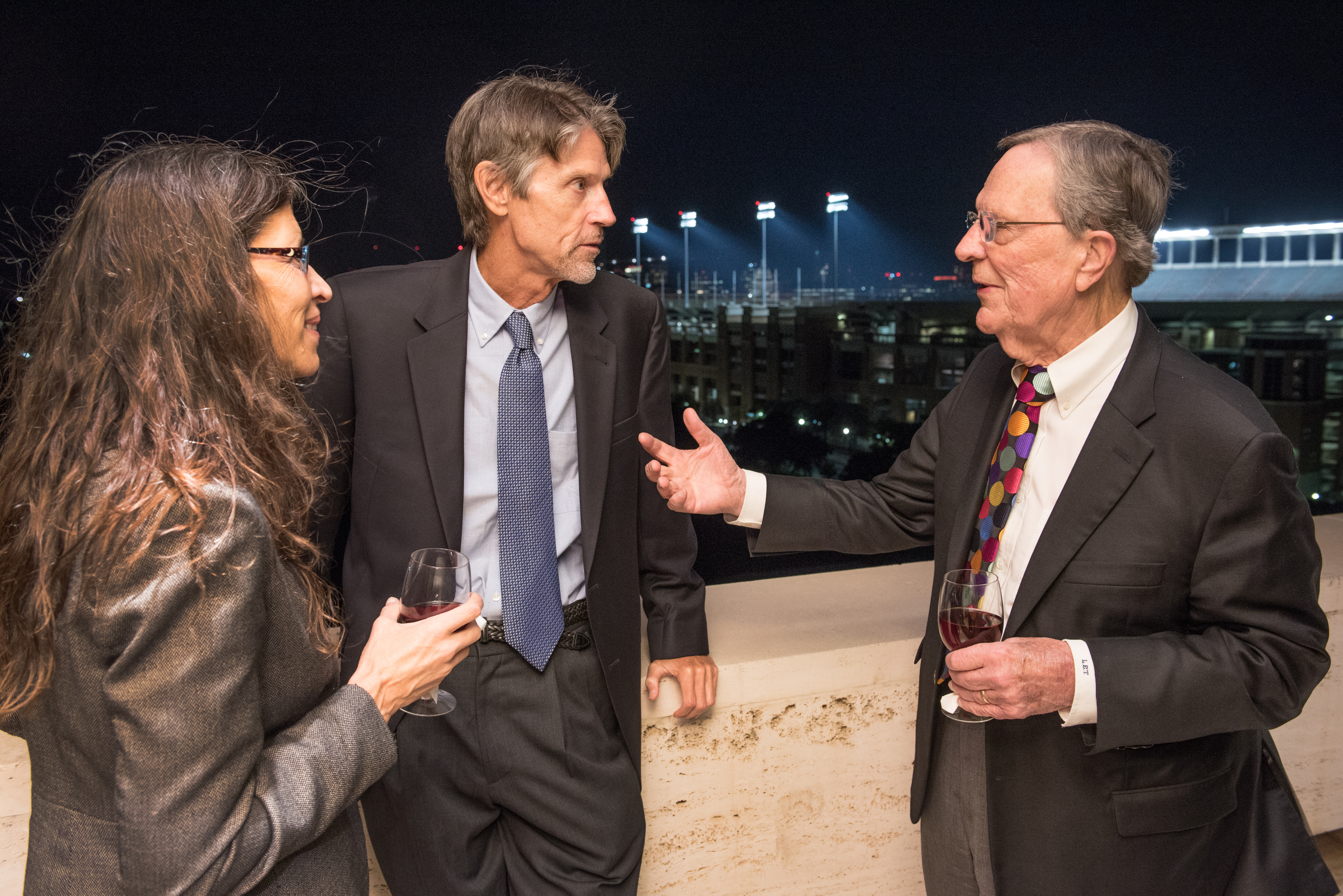
Left to right: Julie Gold, H.W. Brands and Larry Temple at LBJ Library, 2015.

== See also ==
- List of law clerks for the tenth seat of the Supreme Court of the United States

Legal offices
Preceded by Harry McPherson	White House Counsel; 1967–1969	Succeeded by John Ehrlichman
