= Rexall =

Chain of American drugstores

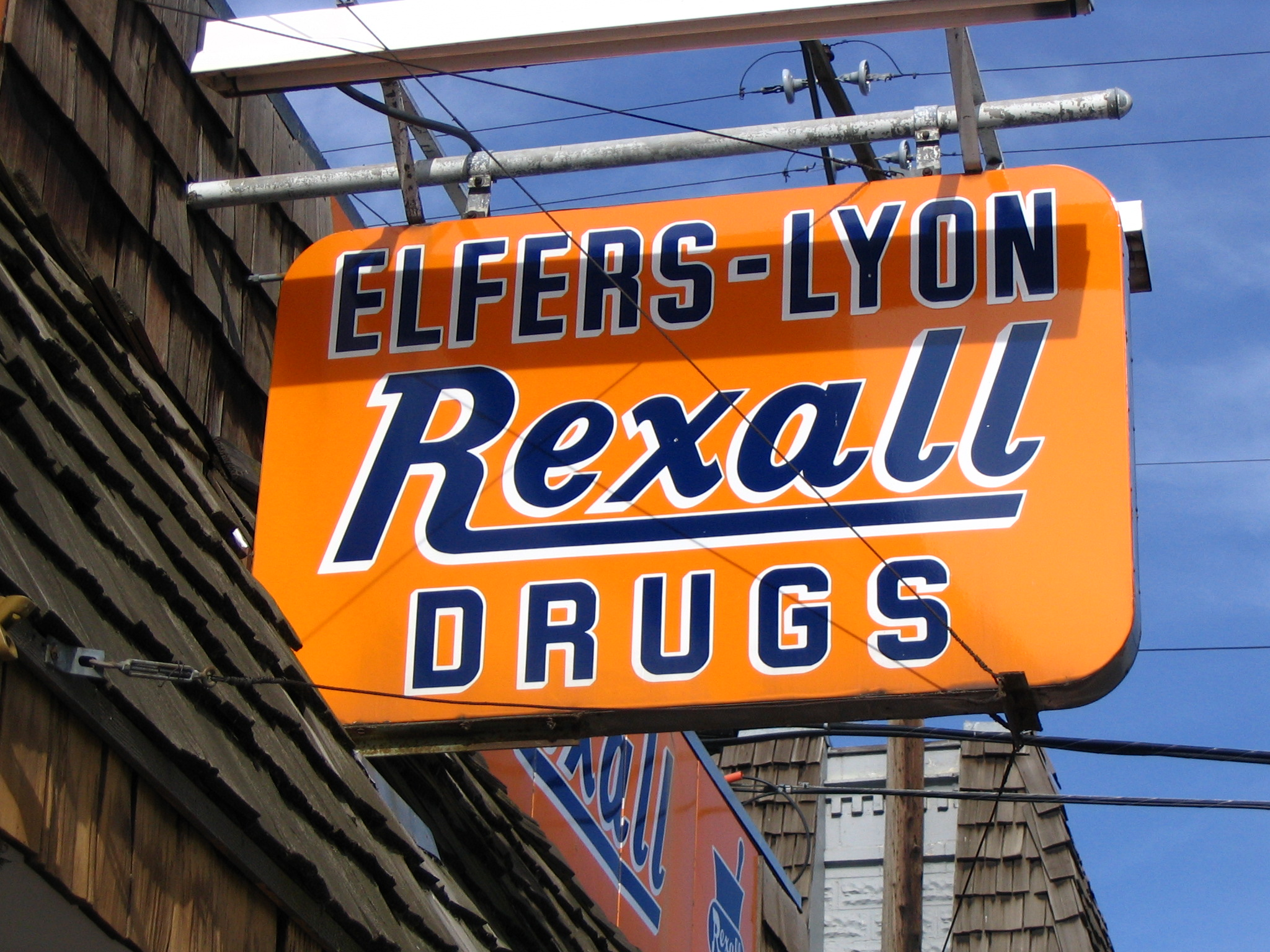
- Type: Private
- Industry: Pharmaceuticals
- Founded: 1903; 123 years ago, in Boston, Massachusetts, U.S.
- Headquarters: Boston, Massachusetts
- Website: rexall.com

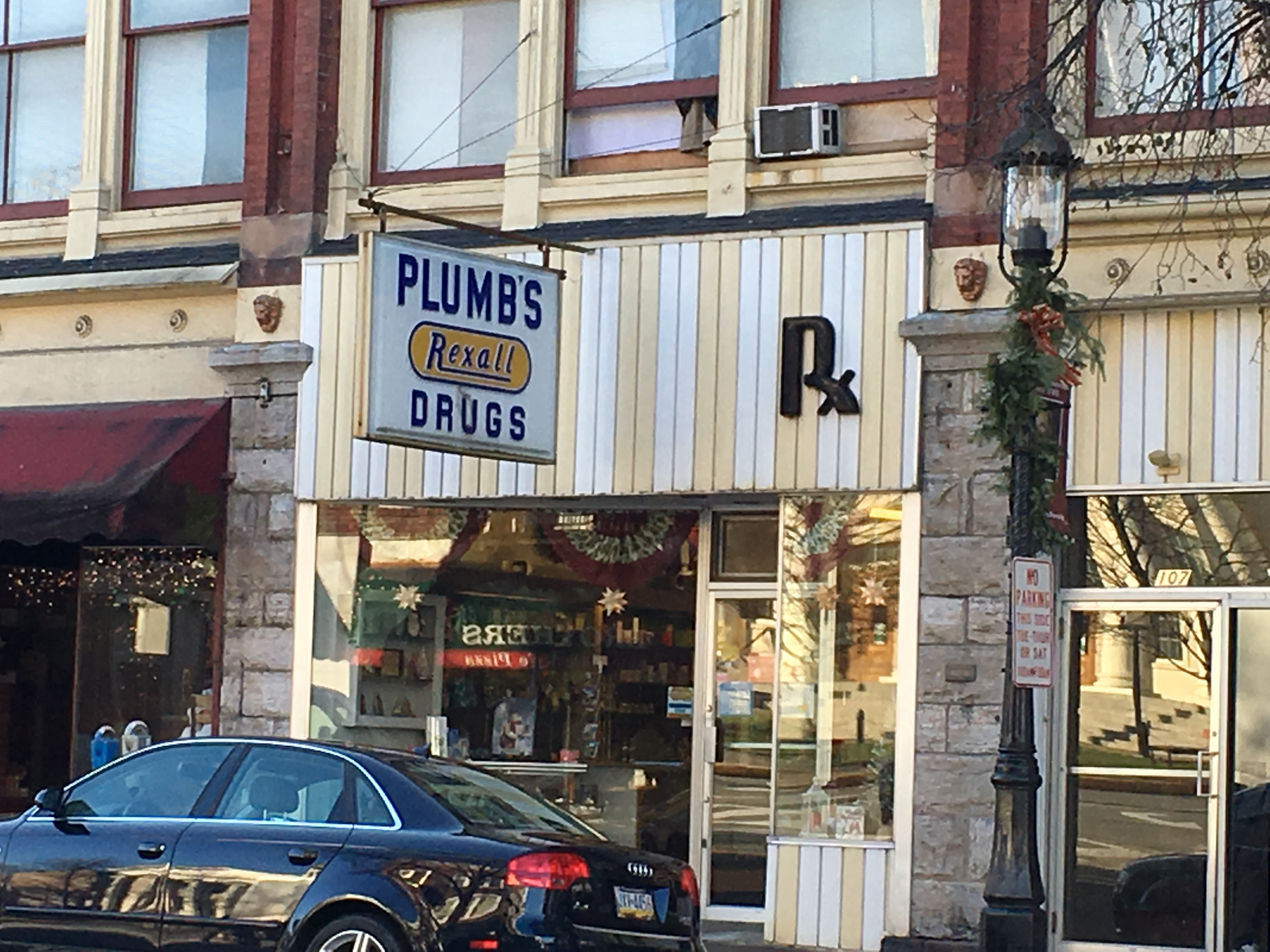
Plumb's Drugs, Rexall in Bellefonte, Pennsylvania

Rexall was a chain of American drugstores, and the name of their store-branded products. The stores, having roots in the federation of United Drug Stores starting in 1903, licensed the Rexall brand name to as many as 12,000 drug stores across the United States from 1920 to 1977.

== Founding ==
In 1903, Louis K. Liggett persuaded 40 independent drug stores to invest $4,000 (~$111,786 in 2024) in a retailers' cooperative called United Drug Stores, which sold products under the Rexall name. After World War I, the cooperative established a franchise arrangement whereby independently owned retail outlets adopted the Rexall trade name and sold Rexall products. The company was based in Boston, in an area now occupied by Northeastern University.

== Rexall Train ==
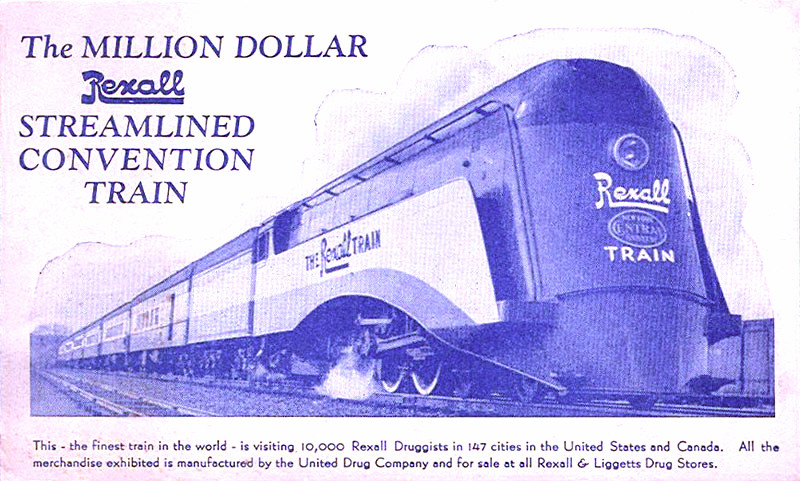
Postcard photo of the Rexall Train

The Rexall Train of March to November 1936 toured the United States and Canada to promote Rexall drug store products, and to provide the equivalent of a national convention for local Rexall druggists without the cost of travel. Free tickets for locals to see displays of Rexall products were available at local Rexall drug stores. The 29,000 mile tour visited 47 of the 48 contiguous states (omitting Nevada) and parts of Canada.

A streamlined steam-powered 4-8-2 Mohawk locomotive (No. 2873) from the New York Central Railroad hauled the similarly streamlined blue-and-white train of twelve air-conditioned Pullman cars. Four of the cars contained displays, four contained convention facilities and one housed a dining car. The train was the million-dollar brainchild of Louis Liggett, who traveled in an observation car at its rear.

== Growth ==
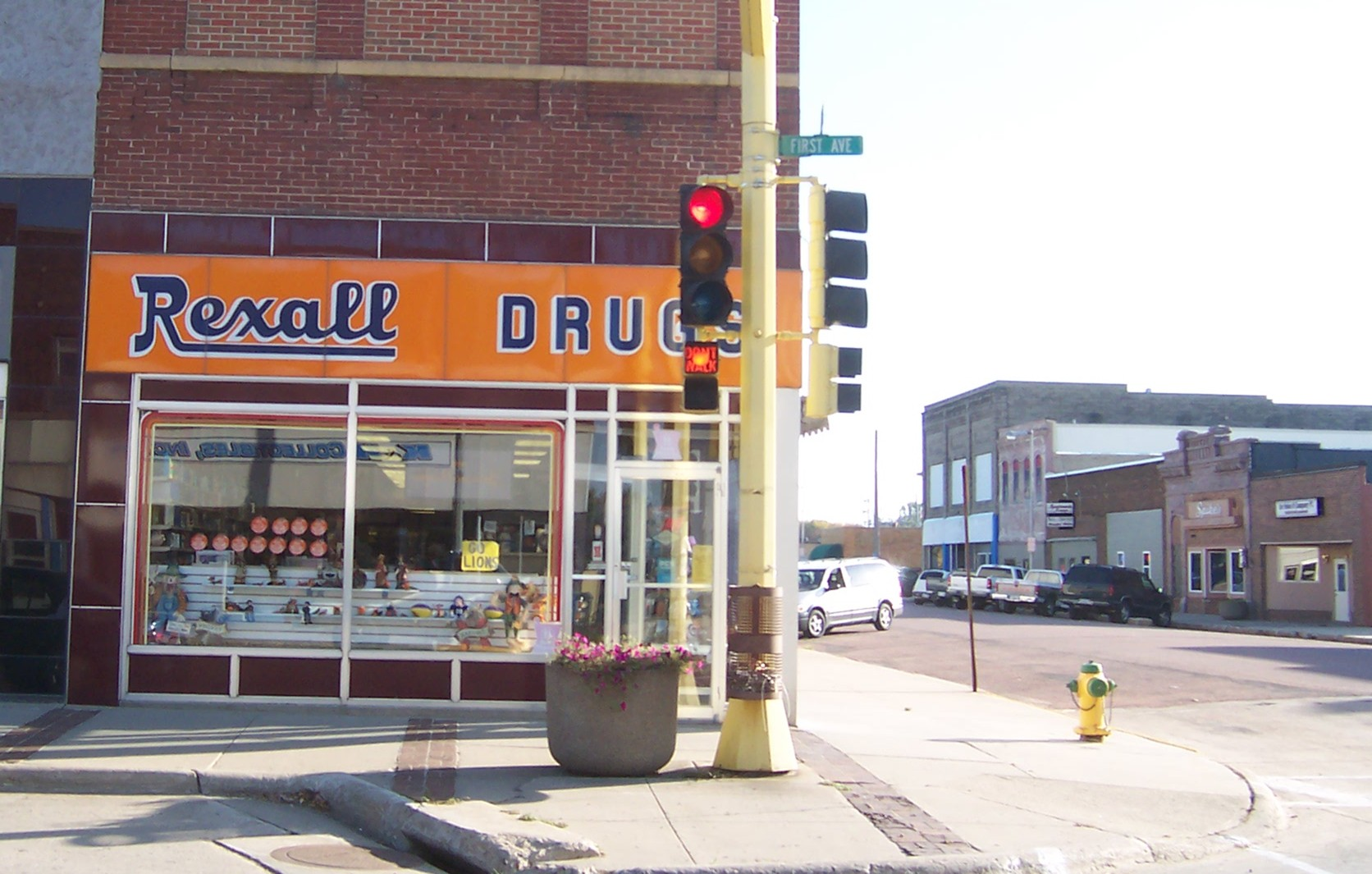
Rexall Drug Store at Rock Rapids, Iowa (2006)

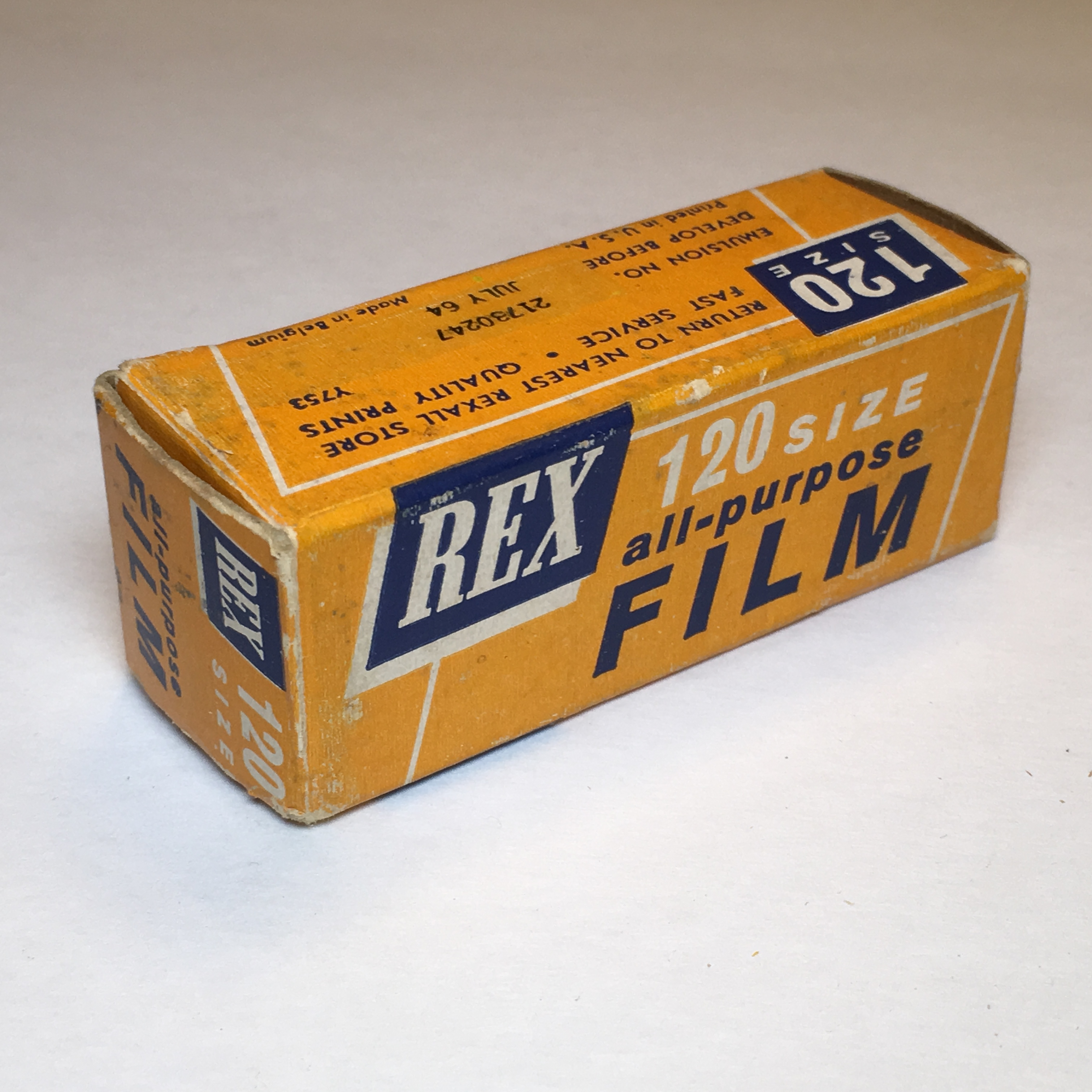
Rexall Drug 120 Panchromatic High Speed Film (1960s)

Justin Whitlock Dart, formerly of the Walgreens drugstore chain, took control of Boston-based United Drug Company in 1943. The chain operated with the Liggett, Owl, Sonta, and Rexall brands, which Dart rebranded under the Rexall name.

Rexall gained national exposure through its sponsorship of two famous classic American radio programs of the 1940s and 1950s: Amos and Andy and The Phil Harris-Alice Faye Show. Both shows were often opened by an advertisement from an actor (Griff Barnett) portraying "your Rexall family druggist", and included the catch phrase "Good health to all from Rexall." They also sponsored the Jimmy Durante Show and references are made by the character Mr. Peavey in some of The Great Gildersleeve radio shows. Rexall also sponsored Richard Diamond, Private Detective starring Dick Powell from April 1950 until Camel cigarettes replaced Rexall as the sponsor after the December 6, 1950, broadcast.

In 1946, United-Rexall Drug Inc. purchased the Renfro chain in Texas, and Lane Drug Stores which had 58 stores throughout the Southeast. It also started the Owl Superstores chain. In 1947, the company held a gala opening for their new headquarters and the first store in Los Angeles, California. The new Hollywood Owl was reported in Life magazine as 'the World's Biggest Drugstore'. In 1958, the Rexall Drug Company was the largest U.S. drug store franchise, with 11,158 stores. By comparison, fewer than 12,000 McDonald's restaurants are in the U.S. today. Time magazine noted that two-thirds of its stores were in areas where one-third of the population lived. However, this comprised more than 20% of all drug stores in the United States.

Also in 1958, Rexall employee Joe Coulombe was asked to test the start of Pronto Markets, a store brand to compete against 7-Eleven. After running six Pronto Markets in the Los Angeles area, Rexall asked Coulombe to close them down. Coulombe decided to buy them out instead, and eventually renamed the chain "Trader Joe's".

Dart sold his stake in Rexall in 1978. He had acquired stakes in West Bend, Duracell, Hobart Corporation, Tupperware, Ralph Wilson Plastics, and Archer Glass, which were collectively known as Dart Industries.

== Decline ==
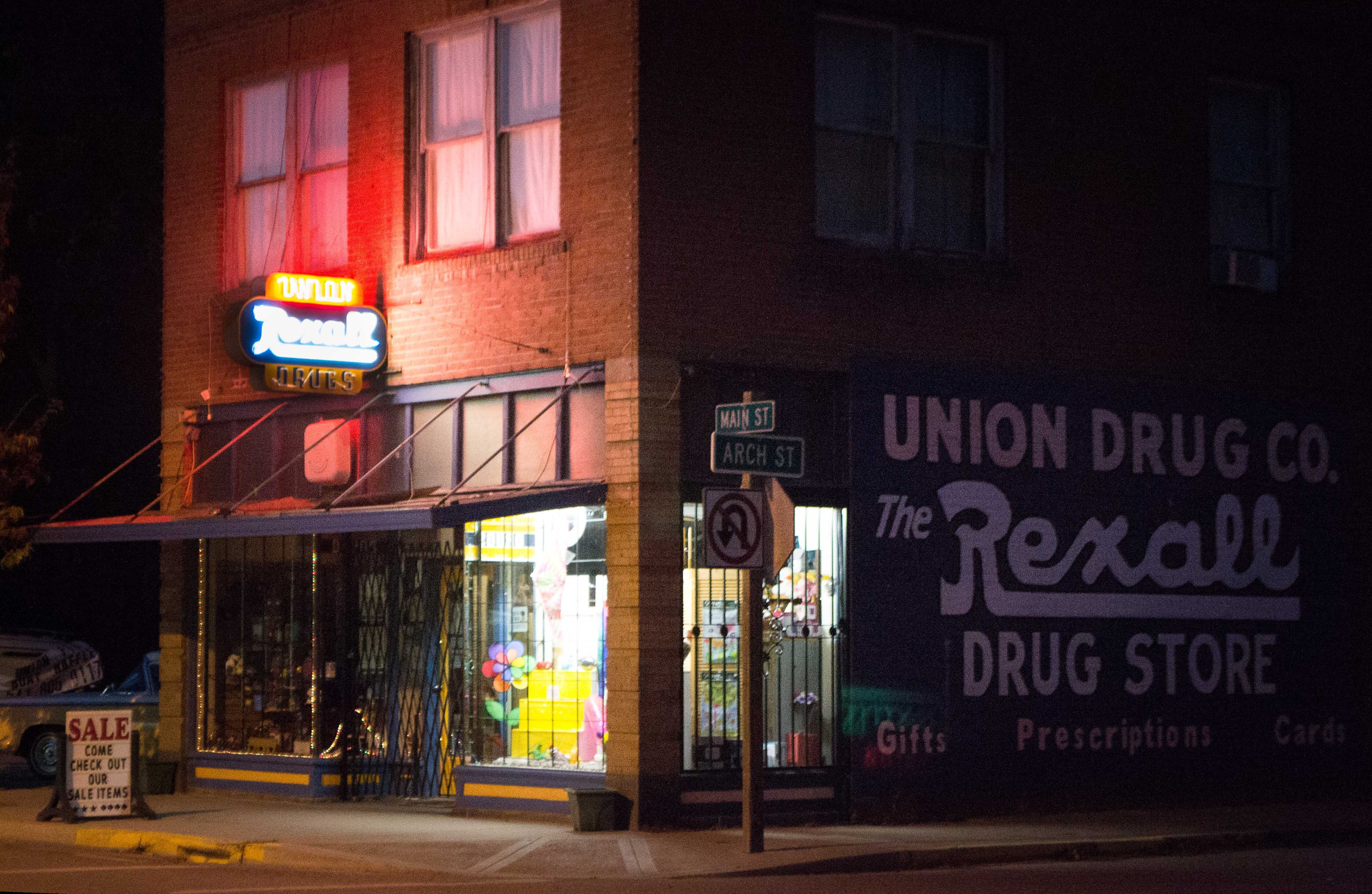
Night falls on Rexall in Union, Oregon (2012)

By the late 1950s, Rexall's business model of unitary franchised stores, with each store owned independently by the local pharmacist, was already coming under attack by the discount chains, such as Thrifty Drug and Eckerd, and later in the 1960s, CVS Pharmacy. These well-financed corporate entities were able to reduce costs with block purchasing, and were focused on growth. By 1977, the value of the Rexall business had deteriorated to the point that it was sold to private investors for $16 million (~$64.5 million in 2024). The investors divested the company-owned stores, though existing franchise retailers were able to keep the Rexall name. These tended to be weaker stores, and few kept the name as time progressed. The company continued to distribute vitamins, health foods, and plastic items. Across the U.S., some franchise retailers still use the Rexall name.

== Rexall-Sundown ==
Sundown, a maker of sunscreens, acquired the Rexall trademark in 1985, in a hostile takeover, and continued to produce nutritional supplements and remedies under the new name Rexall-Sundown, with no relationship to the remaining chain of Rexall drugstores, nor to the Canadian maker of medicines and sundries. Numico acquired Rexall Sundown in 2000. Numico split up the Rexall divisions and divested them in 2003, selling the name Rexall-Sundown to NBTY, a US vitamin company, and the Unicity Network division was to be sold to Activated Holdings, a privately held company. The deal fell through, and Unicity Network was sold to its management. Nestle was later assigned all trademarks of Rexall Sundown. As of 2025 all rights were transferred to Dollar General.

== Dollar General and Rexall ==
In March 2010, Dollar General licensed the Rexall name from healthcare giant McKesson Corporation (which acquired Rexall (Canada) in 2016), and announced that it would be the exclusive retailer for Rexall-branded products. Rexall products are in several of the retailer's categories, including over-the-counter medication, dental care, vitamins and supplements, foot care, and first aid.

== See also ==
- Dockum Drug Store sit-in
