= Tiffany P. Cunningham =

American judge (born 1976)

Tiffany Cunningham
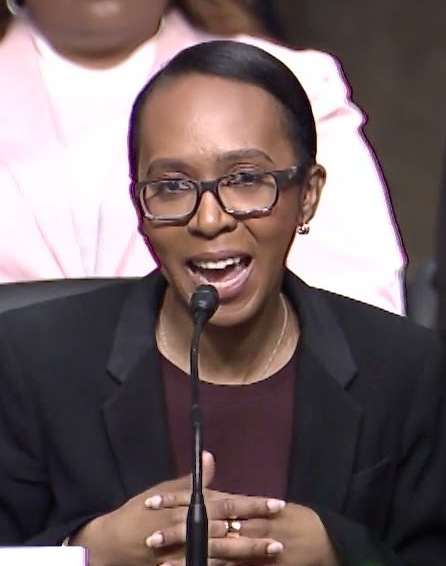

Judge of the United States Court of Appeals for the Federal Circuit
- Incumbent
- Assumed office August 6, 2021
- Appointed by: Joe Biden
- Preceded by: Evan Wallach

Personal details
- Born: May 27, 1976 (age 50) Detroit, Michigan, U.S.
- Education: Massachusetts Institute of Technology (BS); Harvard University (JD)

Tiffany Patrice Cunningham (born May 27, 1976) is a United States circuit judge of the United States Court of Appeals for the Federal Circuit.

== Education ==
After graduating from the Roeper School in Bloomfield Hills, Michigan, Cunningham received her Bachelor of Science degree in chemical engineering from the Massachusetts Institute of Technology (MIT) in 1998 and her Juris Doctor from Harvard Law School in 2001.

== Career ==
Cunningham began her legal career as a law clerk to Judge Timothy B. Dyk of the United States Court of Appeals for the Federal Circuit from 2001 to 2002. In 2002, she joined the Chicago office of Kirkland & Ellis as an associate, and was elevated to partner in 2007, where she remained until 2014. From 2014 to 2021, she was a partner at Perkins Coie in Chicago, where she was a member of the patent litigation practice and served on the 17-member executive committee of the firm. She is also a registered patent attorney before the United States Patent and Trademark Office.

=== Federal judicial service ===
On March 30, 2021, President Joe Biden announced his intent to nominate Cunningham to serve as a United States circuit judge for the United States Court of Appeals for the Federal Circuit. On April 19, 2021, her nomination was sent to the United States Senate. President Biden nominated Cunningham to the seat vacated by Judge Evan Wallach, who assumed senior status on May 31, 2021. On May 26, 2021, a hearing on her nomination was held before the Senate Judiciary Committee. On June 17, 2021, her nomination was favorably reported by the committee by a 16–6 vote. On July 12, 2021, Majority Leader Chuck Schumer filed cloture on her nomination. On July 15, 2021, the Senate invoked cloture on her nomination by a 63–34 vote. On July 19, 2021, her nomination was confirmed by a 63–33 vote. She received her judicial commission on August 6, 2021. She was sworn into office on September 1, 2021. Cunningham is the first African American judge to ever sit on the Federal Circuit. On January 28, 2022, following Justice Stephen Breyer's announcement of his intention to retire as an associate justice of the United States Supreme Court, Cunningham was mentioned as one of the potential nominees for a Supreme Court appointment by President Joe Biden.

== Notable cases ==
On August 29, 2025, Cunningham voted to strike down Trump's tariffs in V.O.S. Selections, Inc. v. Trump. Cunningham wrote a concurring opinion arguing that the power of taxation belongs to Congress alone.

== See also ==
- List of African American federal judges
- List of African American jurists
- Joe Biden Supreme Court candidates

Legal offices
Preceded by Evan Wallach	Judge of the United States Court of Appeals for the Federal Circuit; 2021–present	Incumbent
