= Evan Wallach =

American judge (born 1949)

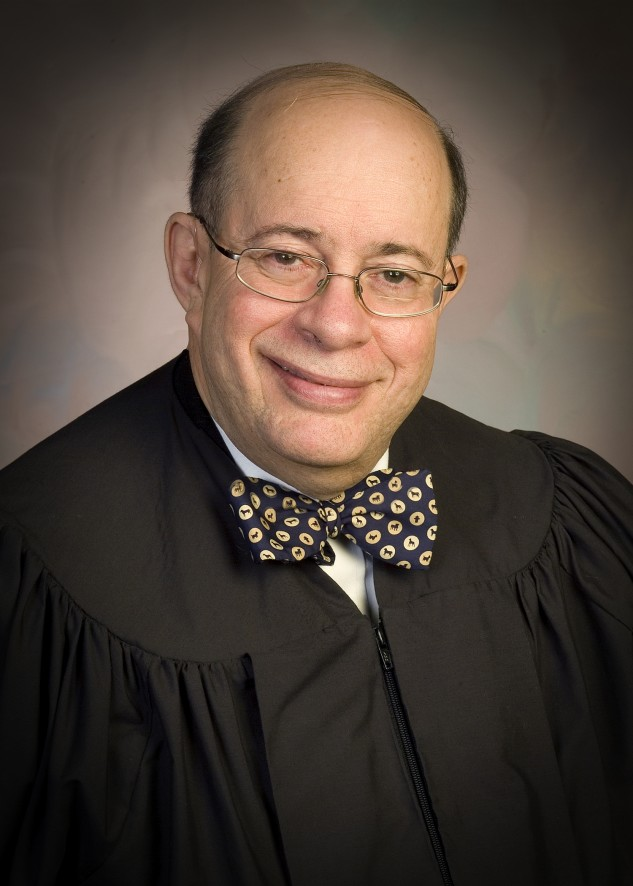

Senior Judge of the United States Court of Appeals for the Federal Circuit
- Incumbent
- Assumed office May 31, 2021

Judge of the United States Court of Appeals for the Federal Circuit
- In office November 18, 2011 – May 31, 2021
- Appointed by: Barack Obama
- Preceded by: Arthur J. Gajarsa
- Succeeded by: Tiffany P. Cunningham

Judge of the United States Court of International Trade
- In office August 14, 1995 – November 18, 2011
- Appointed by: Bill Clinton
- Preceded by: Edward D. Re
- Succeeded by: Claire R. Kelly

Personal details
- Born: Evan Jonathan Wallach; November 11, 1949 (age 77) Superior, Arizona, U.S.
- Education: Diablo Valley College; University of Arizona (BA); University of California, Berkeley (JD); Hughes Hall, Cambridge (LLB)

Military service
- Allegiance: United States
- Branch/service: United States Army
- Years of service: 1969–1971; 1989–1995
- Rank: Major
- Unit: Nevada National Guard
- Battles/wars: Vietnam War
- Awards: Bronze Star; Air Medal; Meritorious Service Medal (2); Nevada Medal of Merit; Vietnam Campaign Medal (3 battle stars); Gallantry Cross with palm

Evan Jonathan Wallach (born November 11, 1949) is an American lawyer and senior United States circuit judge of the United States Court of Appeals for the Federal Circuit. A former judge of the United States Court of International Trade, he is one of the nation's foremost experts on war crimes and the law of war.

== Early life, education, and career ==
Wallach was born in Superior, Arizona, the son of Albert Wallach, a millworker at the Magma Copper Company, and Sara Wallach, a local artist who helped run the town library and Little Theater group. Wallach was decorated for his service in the United States Army during the Vietnam War, and received a Bachelor of Arts degree at the University of Arizona in 1973, followed by a Juris Doctor at the University of California Berkeley in 1976. Wallach joined the firm of Lionel Sawyer & Collins in Las Vegas, Nevada, as an associate, in 1976. He received a Bachelor of Laws with honors in International Law from Hughes Hall, Cambridge in 1981. He became a partner at Lionel Sawyer & Collins in 1982, remaining in that position until 1995.

He was able to take a leave from the firm to continue providing service to the U.S. military. He attended the Judge Advocate General's Legal Center and School at the University of Virginia and served in the United States Army Judge Advocate General's Corps in the International Affairs Division of the Office of TJAG at The Pentagon during the Gulf War, where he assisted in advising on the law of war and investigating war crimes allegedly committed by Iraqi leaders. He has taken JAG Officer's Basic and Advanced Courses.

== Work on the law of war ==
As an adjunct law professor Wallach specializes in the law of war. From 1989 to 1995 he served as Judge Advocate General in the Nevada Army National Guard, with the rank of major. His responsibilities included giving annual lectures to Military Police regarding their legal obligations on treatment of prisoners. During the Gulf War he served at the Pentagon in the International Affairs Division of the Office of The Judge Advocate of the Army, where he assisted in advising on the law of war and investigating war crimes allegedly committed by Iraqi leaders.

From 1997 to 2011 he was an adjunct professor in Law of War at both New York Law School and Brooklyn Law School. From 2001 to 2012 he was a visiting professor in Law of War at the University of Münster. Since 2012 he has been an adjunct professor at the George Washington University Law School and currently teaches a course called "The Law Governing Fully Autonomous Fighting Vehicles."

Wallach is a member of the International Law of War Association, which is a "loose confederation of military lawyers, academics, and government officials including members of the judiciary, who are interested in the advancement of a legal regime to ameliorate suffering and for the regulation of the use of armed force in armed conflicts". He is also a member of the American Law Institute and the Council on Foreign Relations.

== Federal judicial service ==
On June 27, 1995, President Bill Clinton nominated Wallach to serve as a judge of the United States Court of International Trade, to the seat vacated by Judge Edward D. Re. He was confirmed by the Senate on August 11, 1995, and received his commission on August 14, 1995. He served on that court until his elevation to the court of appeals on November 18, 2011.

President Barack Obama nominated him on July 28, 2011, to serve on the United States Court of Appeals for the Federal Circuit. His nomination was reported out of the Senate Judiciary Committee on October 6, 2011, by a voice vote. On November 8, 2011, his nomination was confirmed by the Senate by a 99–0 vote. He received his commission on November 18, 2011. He assumed senior status on May 31, 2021.

== Publications ==
Wallach has had articles published both in mainstream media and legal journals, and has been widely cited in the media. Some of these include:

- Outline of the law of war.
- Waterboarding Used to Be a Crime.
- Afghanistan, Quirin, and Uchiyama: Does the Sauce Suit the Gander?
- The Logical Nexus Between The Decision To Deny Application of The Third Geneva Convention To The Taliban and al Qaeda, and the Mistreatment of Prisoners in Abu Ghraib.
- The Procedural and Evidentiary Rules of the Post World War II War Crimes Trials: Did They Provide an Outline for International Legal Procedure?
- Drop by Drop: Forgetting the History of Water Torture in U.S. Courts.
- A Tiny Problem With Huge Implications - Nanotech Agents as Enablers or Substitutes for Banned Chemical Weapons: Is a New Treaty Needed?
- Pray Fire First Gentlemen of France: Has 21st Century Chivalry Been Subsumed by Humanitarian Law?
- The Economic Calculus of Fielding Autonomous Fighting Vehicles Compliant with the Laws of Armed Conflict.

He is also the author of "Jake and Me," a coming of age novel about a young man in the 1920s Arizona mountains.

Legal offices
Preceded by Edward D. Re	Judge of the United States Court of International Trade; 1995–2011	Succeeded by Claire R. Kelly
Preceded by Arthur J. Gajarsa	Judge of the United States Court of Appeals for the Federal Circuit; 2011–2021	Succeeded by Tiffany P. Cunningham
