= Edward D. Re =

American judge

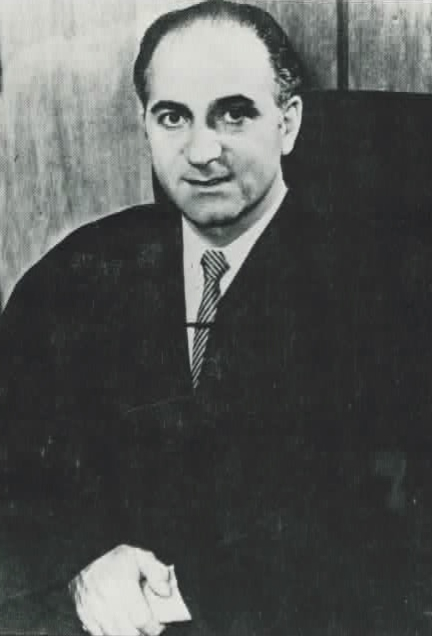

Chief Judge of the United States Court of International Trade
- In office 1980–1991
- Preceded by: Office established
- Succeeded by: Dominick L. DiCarlo

Judge of the United States Court of International Trade
- In office November 1, 1980 – April 30, 1991
- Appointed by: operation of law
- Preceded by: Seat established by 94 Stat. 1727
- Succeeded by: Evan Wallach

Chief Judge of the United States Customs Court
- In office 1977–1980
- Preceded by: Nils Boe
- Succeeded by: Office abolished

Judge of the United States Customs Court
- In office October 4, 1968 – November 1, 1980
- Appointed by: Lyndon B. Johnson
- Preceded by: Lindley Beckworth
- Succeeded by: Seat abolished

5th Assistant Secretary of State for Educational and Cultural Affairs
- In office February 28, 1968 – January 9, 1969
- Preceded by: Charles Frankel
- Succeeded by: John Richardson Jr.

Personal details
- Born: Edward Domenic Re; October 14, 1920 Santa Marina Salina, Italy
- Died: September 17, 2006 (aged 85) New York City, New York, U.S.
- Education: St. John's University (BS); St. John's University School of Law (LLB); New York University School of Law (JSD)

Edward Domenic Re (October 14, 1920 – September 17, 2006) was a judge of the United States Court of International Trade.

== Education and career ==
Born on October 14, 1920, in Santa Marina Salina, Italy, Re received a Bachelor of Science degree in 1941 from the School of Commerce at St. John's University in New York City, New York and a Bachelor of Laws in 1943 from St. John's University School of Law. He served as a United States Air Force lieutenant from 1943 to 1947. In 1950, he received a Doctor of Juridical Science from New York University School of Law. He was a faculty member at St. John's University School of Law from 1947 to 2004, as a professor of law from 1947 to 1969, as an adjunct professor of law from 1969 to 1980, and again as a professor of law from 1980 to 2004. He was a professor of law at Pratt Institute from 1947 to 1948. He was a hearing officer with the United States Department of Justice from 1958 to 1969. He was a member of the New York City Board of Higher Education (now City University of New York) from 1958 to 1969. He was Chairman of the Foreign Claims Settlement Commission at the United States Department of Justice from 1961 to 1968. He was a Visiting Professor of Law at Georgetown University from 1962 to 1967. He was the Assistant Secretary of State for Educational and Cultural Affairs at the United States Department of State from 1968 to 1969. He was an adjunct and visiting professor of law at New York Law School from 1972 to 1990.

== Federal judicial service ==
Re was nominated by President Lyndon B. Johnson on September 12, 1968, to a seat on the United States Customs Court vacated by Lindley Beckworth. He was confirmed by the United States Senate on October 2, 1968, and received his commission on October 4, 1968. He served as Chief Judge from 1977 to 1980. He was reassigned by operation of law to the United States Court of International Trade on November 1, 1980, to a new seat authorized by 94 Stat. 1727. He served as Chief Judge from 1980 to 1991.

Re was a fierce critic of Richard Serra's sculpture, Tilted Arc, which had been installed on Foley Square outside his courthouse, and advocated for its removal. Re was a member of the Judicial Conference of the United States from 1990 to 1991. Judge Re's service terminated on April 30, 1991, due to his retirement. He died on September 17, 2006, in New York City.

== Sources ==
- The Italian American Experience: An Encyclopedia (Garland Publishing, 2000), p. 535
- "Paid Notice: Deaths RE, JUDGE EDWARD D." The New York Times. September 19, 2006.

Government offices
Preceded by Charles Frankel	Assistant Secretary of State for Educational and Cultural Affairs; 1968–1969	Succeeded by John Richardson Jr.
Preceded by Lindley Beckworth	Judge of the United States Customs Court; 1968–1980	Succeeded by Seat abolished
Preceded by Nils Boe	Chief Judge of the United States Customs Court; 1977–1980	Succeeded by Office abolished
Preceded by Seat established by 94 Stat. 1727	Judge of the United States Court of International Trade; 1980–1991	Succeeded by Evan Wallach
Preceded by Office established	Chief Judge of the United States Court of International Trade; 1980–1991	Succeeded by Dominick L. DiCarlo
