= Mark Taplin =

American diplomat

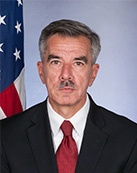
Mark Taplin (2016)

Mark Taplin was Assistant Secretary of State for Educational and Cultural Affairs with the rank of Minister-Counselor. He was appointed on May 3, 2016. Taplin was also Deputy Chief of Mission and Chargé d'Affaires at the U.S. Embassy in France from 2010 until 2014. He also held the same posts in Romania from 2005 until 2008.

Before posting to France, Taplin was a Public Diplomacy Fellow at the George Washington University School of Media and Public Affairs, where he taught and conducted research.

Taplin earned a bachelor's degree in humanities and international affairs from the Georgetown University School of Foreign Service and a master's degree in strategic studies from the University College of Wales (Aberystwyth).
