= John Richardson (born 1886) =

American lawyer

John Richardson (September 30, 1886 – January 24, 1976) was an American attorney and political figure from Massachusetts.

== Early life ==
Richardson was born on September 30, 1886, in Chestnut Hill, Massachusetts, to John and Louisa Storrow (Cabot) Richardson. He attended Noble and Greenough School, Harvard College (A.B. 1908), and Harvard Law School (LL.B. 1911). While at Harvard, Richardson was captain of the Harvard crew and was elected to the Harvard Varsity Club's Hall of Fame.

On September 7, 1909, Richardson married Hope Hemenway, the daughter of Augustus and Harriet Hemenway. They had five children, including John Richardson, Jr., who was United States Assistant Secretary of State for Educational and Cultural Affairs from 1969 to 1977.

== Legal career ==
From 1911 until his retirement 1970s, Richardson worked for the Boston law firm of Ropes & Gray. For most of that time he specialized in corporate and trustee work and was also responsible for hiring young lawyers to join the firm.

== Military service ==
Richardson served in the United States Army during World War I, rising from the rank to private to captain. He also worked in the United States Food Administration under the direction of Herbert Hoover.

== Politics ==
Richardson worked for Herbert Hoover's nomination for President of the United States at the 1920, 1924, and 1928 Republican National Conventions. When White House Press Secretary George E. Akerson resigned in 1931, Richardson was considered a likely successor for the position, however he chose to work for Hoover's reelection campaign instead.

On June 13, 1932, Richardson was elected to the Republican National Committee over former United States Senator and Republican National Committee Chairman William M. Butler by a vote of 18 to 15. Richardson's support came from by the younger members of the party, led by President of the Massachusetts Senate Gaspar G. Bacon, Speaker of the Massachusetts House of Representatives Leverett Saltonstall, Carl A. Terry, and Christian Herter. At the 1932 Republican National Convention, Richardson and the Massachusetts delegation supported Alvan T. Fuller for Vice President. Vice President Charles Curtis was renominated.

In 1933, the Massachusetts Republican Party became split over the position of chairman of the Republican State Committee. Richardson supported Carl A. Terry, who defeated Charles Hiller Innes. The following year, Richardson supported George G. Tarbell to succeed Terry as chairman.

In 1936, Richardson chose not to run for reelection and Congressman Joseph W. Martin was elected unopposed to succeed him as the Massachusetts member of the Republican National Committee.

== Other work and death ==
From 1926 to 1968, Richardson served as president of the Boston Better Business Bureau. He also served as moderator of the Canton town meeting for over 40 years and was chairman of the board of trustees of the Noble and Greenough School.

Richardson died on January 24, 1976, at his home in Canton.

Party political offices
Preceded by Louis K. Liggett	Republican National Committeeman from Massachusetts; 1932–1936	Succeeded by Joseph William Martin Jr.
