= Harry McPherson =

American lawyer (1929–2012)

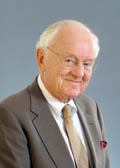

White House Director of Speechwriting
- In office October 26, 1967 – January 20, 1969
- President: Lyndon B. Johnson
- Preceded by: Stephen Harmelin
- Succeeded by: Jim Keogh

White House Counsel
- In office February 11, 1966 – October 26, 1967
- President: Lyndon B. Johnson
- Preceded by: Lee White
- Succeeded by: Larry Temple

3rd Assistant Secretary of State for Educational and Cultural Affairs
- In office August 23, 1964 – August 14, 1965
- President: Lyndon B. Johnson
- Preceded by: Lucius Battle
- Succeeded by: Charles Frankel

Personal details
- Born: Harry Cummings McPherson Jr. August 22, 1929 Tyler, Texas, U.S.
- Died: February 16, 2012 (aged 82) Bethesda, Maryland, U.S.
- Party: Democratic
- Education: Southern Methodist University (attended); University of the South (BA); Columbia University (MA); University of Texas, Austin (LLB)

Harry Cummings McPherson Jr. (August 22, 1929 – February 16, 2012) served as counsel and special counsel to President of the United States Lyndon B. Johnson from 1965 to 1969 and was Johnson's chief speechwriter from 1966 to 1969. McPherson's A Political Education, 1972, is a classic insider's view of Washington and an essential source for Johnson's presidency. A prominent Washington lawyer and lobbyist since 1969, McPherson was awarded American Lawyer magazine's Lifetime Achievement Award in 2008. He died February 16, 2012, in Bethesda, Maryland.

== Early life, education, military service ==
McPherson was born and raised in Tyler, Texas. He attended Southern Methodist University and received his B.A. in 1949 from the University of the South. Intending to be a poet and a writer, he enrolled at Columbia University for a master's degree in English literature. When the Korean War broke out in 1950, however, he enlisted in the Air Force. McPherson served in Germany as an intelligence officer, studying Russian troop deployments and plotting targets.

As soon as the Korean War ended, McPherson enrolled at the University of Texas School of Law.

This was the era when McCarthyism was at its peak. I was very upset about Joe McCarthy and decided that I wanted to be a lawyer to defend people against the likes of McCarthy. I was worried that he was going to usher a period of totalitarianism in the United States. I wanted to fight that.

He received his LL.B. in 1956. Shortly afterwards, he was invited to Washington by a cousin who worked for Lyndon Baines Johnson. Johnson, who was at the time the Senate majority leader, was seeking a young lawyer from Texas to work for the Democratic Policy Committee, which Johnson chaired.

== Early public service in Washington ==
McPherson served as assistant general counsel (1956–1959), associate counsel (1959–1961) and general counsel (1961–1963) to the Democratic Policy Committee, the Democratic Party's key legislative policy organ on the Senate side. His duties included summarizing bills coming before the Senate for members of the Calendar Committee. An outspoken advocate for civil rights, he helped draft legislation that became the Civil Rights Act of 1957, whose goal was to ensure that all African Americans could exercise their right to vote. After Kennedy was elected with Johnson as his vice president, McPherson continued to serve as counsel to the Democratic Policy Committee under Senator Mike Mansfield.

From 1963 to 1964, McPherson served as deputy under secretary of the Army for international affairs and special assistant to the secretary for civil functions. His responsibilities included settling civilian disputes in the Panama Canal Zone and Okinawa, and overseeing the Army Corps of Engineers.

The following year (August 1964-August 1965) he served as assistant secretary of state in the Bureau of Educational and Cultural Affairs, which arranged for thousands of foreigners to study at American universities, for foreign officials and cultural groups to visit the United States, and for American orchestras and dance companies to travel abroad.

== Counsel to President Lyndon B. Johnson ==
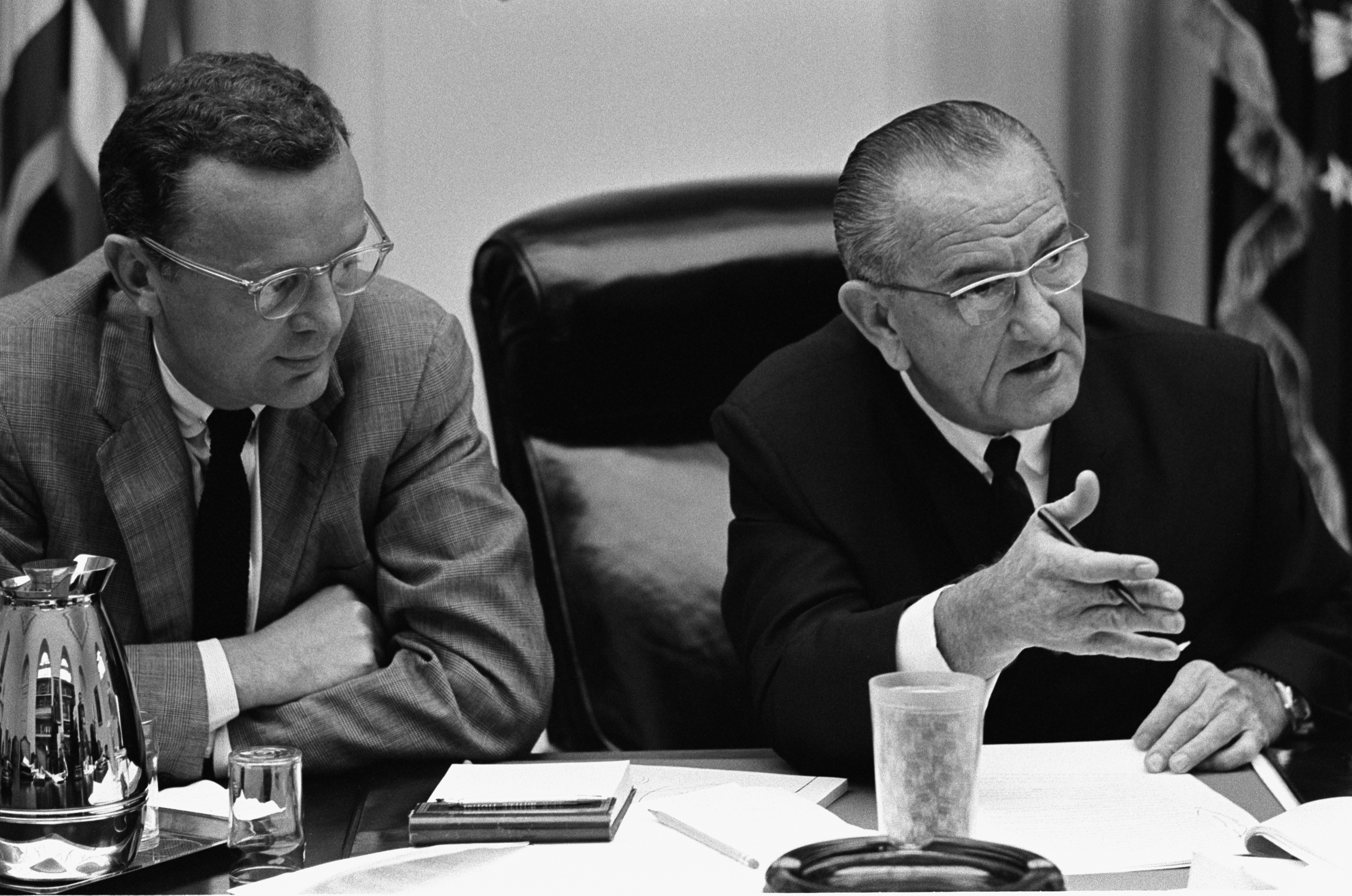
McPherson with President Johnson. Photo courtesy Lyndon Baines Johnson Library and Museum.

In August 1965, McPherson became special assistant and counsel to the president, and then special counsel to the president (1966–1969). McPherson was one of Johnson's most trusted advisers, influencing his support for equal employment and Medicare legislation. In Flawed Giant, his massive biography of Johnson, Robert Dallek notes:

Though he worked as the President's personal lawyer for the next two years, he principally served as Johnson's top speech writer. An evocative writer with a keen feel for Johnson's style of speaking and desire for terse, spare prose that included "a little poetry" and some alliteration, McPherson crafted all the President's major addresses beginning in the summer of 1966.

In 1966, McPherson and his colleague Berl Bernhard organized the White House Conference on Civil Rights, whose 2,400 participants included Dr. Martin Luther King Jr., Thurgood Marshall, and representatives of almost every major civil rights group. According to Kevin L. Yuill, "This conference, promised in Johnson's famous Howard University speech in 1965, was to be the high point of Johnson's already considerable efforts on civil rights."

McPherson came to believe the Vietnam War was unwinnable, and along with Secretary of Defense Clark Clifford helped persuade Johnson to scale back the bombing of North Vietnam. McPherson drafted Johnson's landmark televised address of March 31, 1968, announcing the policy turnaround in Vietnam as well as the fact that he would not seek reelection.

McPherson's A Political Education, covering the years 1956 to 1969, concludes as follows:

Perhaps the most serious question of all was whether we could learn from our experience and shorten the lag between events and our response to them. Nearly twenty years passed from the time black Americans began leaving the South, until the national government began to respond to their unique problems in the Northern and Western cities. Our apprehension of the danger to us in the unification of Vietnam under Hanoi's rule was the same in 1963 as it had been in 1954. Our political leaders, like the rest of us, dealt with new phenomena on the basis of prevailing assumptions. Usually the assumptions were changed only by bitter experience, not by analysis and foresight. The public's reluctance to think new thoughts had much to do with that; so did their faith, which their leaders shared, that as a nation we were immune to history. We believed we could afford the lag, with our cushion of power, wealth, and resourcefulness. Detroit and Tet told us otherwise. It was Lyndon Johnson's fate to be President at a time when the cost of the lag came home. On the whole, he paid it bravely. ... He finished the old agenda, and by painful example taught us something about the new.

In a 1981 interview, McPherson called Johnson "a vehement, dominant, brilliant man – not intellectually brilliant in the sense of having a vast store of reading and knowledge about world history, certainly not the historian that Harry Truman was. But brilliant in sheer wit, in sheer intellectual mental horsepower. The smartest man I ever saw." He reiterated this admiration in 1999: "To this day, Johnson is still the smartest man I've ever met, although maybe not the wisest."

== Private law practice in Washington, D.C. ==
Soon after Johnson left office, McPherson joined the Washington-based law firm Verner, Liipfert, and Bernhard, which he helped turn into one of the capital's best-known lobbying firms. (In 2002 the firm merged with DLA Piper.) McPherson counseled businesses, nonprofit organizations, foreign governments, and individuals on a range of matters involving Congress, the executive branch, and regulatory agencies. Notable cases included:

- Represented a major television network in the successful struggle to repeal the Financial Interest and Syndication Rules (the "fin-syn" rule), imposed by the FCC in 1970 and abolished in 1993, which prevented major television networks from owning any of the programming aired in primetime.
- Brokered the Tobacco Master Settlement Agreement in 1998 between Big Tobacco and 46 states, which gave tobacco companies some immunity from class action suits in exchange for limiting nicotine levels and paying antismoking groups about $250 billion.
- Represented more than 2,500 Czech-Americans in obtaining compensation for assets seized by the Communist government of Czechoslovakia.

McPherson served on several presidential commissions. President Jimmy Carter appointed him to the President's Commission on the Accident at Three Mile Island (1979). President Ronald Reagan appointed him vice chairman of the United States Cultural and Trade Center Commission, which planned a 600,000-square-foot (56,000 m^{2}) facility in the Federal Triangle. Presidents George H. W. Bush and Bill Clinton appointed him a member of the 1993 U.S. Base Realignment and Closure Commission.

He was active in cultural, civic, and political organizations. From 1969 to 1974 he was a member of the board of trustees of the Woodrow Wilson International Center for Scholars, Smithsonian Institution. He was on the board of directors of the Council on Foreign Relations from 1974 to 1977, and was chairman of the Democratic Advisory Council of Elected Officials Task Force on Democratic Policy (1974–76). After serving as vice-chairman of the John F. Kennedy Center for the Performing Arts, he served from 1976 to 1991 as its general counsel. From 1983 to 1988 he was president of the Federal City Council, a civic organization of business, professional and cultural leaders in Washington. From 1992 to 1999, he served as president of the Economic Club of Washington.

McPherson helped the board of DLA Piper's international pro bono division institute a program that sends Northwestern University Law School professors to teach at Ethiopia's underfunded Addis Ababa University School of Law.

McPherson married Clayton Reid in 1952; the couple had two children, Coco and Peter. He was divorced in 1981 and married in 1981 to Mary Patricia DeGroot, with whom he had a son, Samuel.

== Publications and awards ==
A Political Education (originally published 1972) is McPherson's insider view of the nation's capital from 1956 to 1969. Anatole Broyard of The New York Times described the book as "fascinating to read" and McPherson as "refreshingly candid in both his praises and his criticisms." A Political Education has become a political classic and is considered essential reading for understanding of LBJ and the Johnson administration. It is frequently cited in two definitive biographies of Johnson, Caro's Master of the Senate and Dallek's Flawed Giant.

McPherson was the author of numerous articles on foreign policy and political issues published in The New York Times, the Washington Post, and elsewhere. He served on the Editorial Advisory Board of Foreign Affairs and the Publications Committee of The Public Interest.

In 1994, McPherson was recipient of the Judge Learned Hand Human Relations Award. In 2008, he was honored with a Lifetime Achievement Award by American Lawyer magazine.

Political offices
| Preceded by Lucius Battle | Assistant Secretary of State for Educational and Cultural Affairs; 1964–1965 | Succeeded by Charles Frankel |
Legal offices
| Preceded by Lee White | White House Counsel; 1966–1967 | Succeeded by Larry Temple |
