= Jon Richardson (disambiguation) =

Jon Richardson (born 1982) is an English comedian.

Jon Richardson may also refer to:

- Jon Richardson (footballer) (born 1975), English footballer

== See also ==
- John Richardson (disambiguation)
- Jonathan Richardson (disambiguation)
