= James Keogh (speechwriter) =

American journalist

Jim Keogh

Director of the United States Information Agency
- In office February 8, 1973 – November 30, 1976
- President: Richard Nixon; Gerald Ford
- Preceded by: Frank Shakespeare
- Succeeded by: John Reinhardt

White House Director of Speechwriting
- In office January 20, 1969 – December 31, 1970
- President: Richard Nixon
- Preceded by: Harry McPherson
- Succeeded by: Ray Price

Personal details
- Born: October 28, 1916 Platte County, Nebraska, U.S.
- Died: May 10, 2006 (aged 89) Greenwich, Connecticut, U.S.
- Party: Republican
- Education: Creighton University (BA)

James Keogh (October 28, 1916 – May 10, 2006) was an American magazine editor and political advisor who worked as the executive editor of Time magazine and the head of the White House speechwriting staff under Richard Nixon.

== Early life and education ==
Keogh was born in Platte County, Nebraska and graduated from Creighton University in Omaha in 1938.

== Career ==
He worked for the Omaha World-Herald in Omaha before working at Time magazine. He worked as an affairs reporter at Time in 1951, and was the assistant managing editor from 1961 to 1968.

Keogh worked as a special assistant to President Nixon in 1969, and became his head speechwriter in 1970. He was the director of the United States Information Agency from 1973 to 1977. Keogh also wrote two books, This Is Nixon in 1956, and President Nixon and the Press in 1972.

== Death ==
Keogh died on May 10, 2006, in Greenwich, Connecticut at the age of 89. The cause of death was respiratory failure.
