= Louis K. Liggett =

American drug store magnate

Louis Kroh Liggett
- Liggett in 1920
- Born: April 4, 1875; Detroit, Michigan
- Died: June 5, 1946 (aged 71); Brookline, Massachusetts
- Resting place: Newton Cemetery; Newton, Massachusetts
- Political party: Republican
- Spouse: Musa Bence (m. 1895–1931)

Louis Kroh Liggett (April 4, 1875 – June 5, 1946) was an American drug store magnate who founded L.K. Liggett Drug Company and then Rexall. He was later chairman of United Drug Company. He was a member of the Republican National Committee for Massachusetts.

== Biography ==
He was born in Detroit, Michigan, on April 4, 1875. His parents were John Templeton Liggett and Julia A. Kroh.

In 1936 he toured America and parts of Canada with the Rexall Train to promote Rexall stores and products. In 1937 Louis Liggett moved to 170 Ivy Street, in Brookline, Massachusetts.

He died on June 5, 1946, in Brookline, Massachusetts. He was entombed in the Liggett Mausoleum in Newton Cemetery in Newton.

=== Estate in Chestnut Hill Newton ===
From 1916 to 1937, Louis Liggett owned and occupied a 9-acre (36,000 m^{2}) estate at 185 Hammond Street in the village of Chestnut Hill in Newton, Massachusetts. The main house, built in 1895, was modeled on Gwydr Hall in Wales. Musa Liggett died in 1931. The estate was donated in 1937 to Cardinal William Henry O'Connell, Archbishop of Boston, who in 1941 donated it to Boston College, which used it to create its Upper Campus. The main house is now known as O'Connell House and is the center of the Upper Campus. On April 22–23, 1938, the furniture and other property of the late Musa Bence Liggett were sold at auction by Louis K. Liggett's order at American Art Association-Anderson Galleries in New York City.

== Personal life ==
On June 26, 1895, Liggett married Musa Bence. She was born in Michigan on March 19, 1873, to Lavinia and George W. Bence. Liggett and Bence had three children. Musa died on September 7, 1931, in Plymouth, Massachusetts.

== Resources ==
- The Rexall Story: A History of Genius and Neglect by Mickey C. Smith ISBN 0-7890-2472-1

Party political offices
Preceded by William M. Butler	Republican National Committeeman from Massachusetts; 1928–1932	Succeeded by John Richardson
