= Claire R. Kelly =

American judge (born 1965)

Claire Kelly
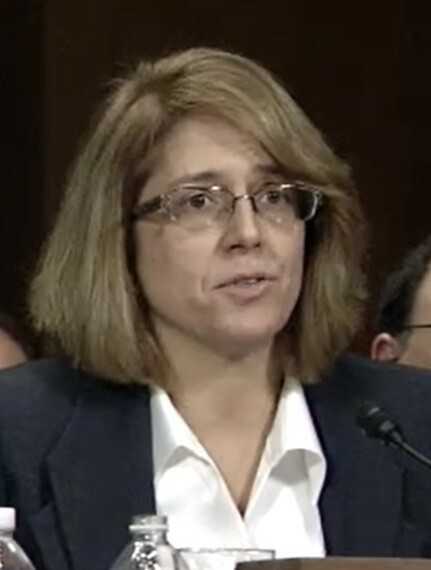

Judge of the United States Court of International Trade
- Incumbent
- Assumed office May 28, 2013
- Appointed by: Barack Obama
- Preceded by: Evan Wallach

Personal details
- Born: 1965 (age 60–61) New York City, New York, U.S.
- Education: Barnard College (BA); Brooklyn Law School (JD)

Claire Rita Kelly (born 1965) is a United States judge of the United States Court of International Trade.

== Biography ==
Kelly was born in 1965 in New York City. She attended Sacred Heart Academy and graduated with a Bachelor of Arts degree, cum laude, in 1987 from Barnard College. She received her Juris Doctor, magna cum laude, in 1993 from Brooklyn Law School. From 1993 to 1997, she worked as an associate at Coudert Brothers in New York City. From 1997 to 2013, she was a Professor of Law at Brooklyn Law School and focused her scholarship on international trade and financial law issues. She served as co-director for the Dennis J. Block Center for the Study of International Business Law. She served on the board of directors of the Customs and International Trade Bar Association and chaired its subcommittee on trade adjustment assistance.

== Trade Court service ==
On November 14, 2012, President Barack Obama nominated Kelly to serve as a United States Judge for the United States Court of International Trade, to the seat vacated by Judge Evan Wallach, who was elevated to the United States Court of Appeals for the Federal Circuit on November 18, 2011. On January 2, 2013, her nomination was returned to the President, due to the sine die adjournment of the Senate. On January 3, 2013, she was renominated to the same office. Her nomination was reported by the Senate Judiciary Committee on February 14, 2013, by voice vote. Her nomination was confirmed on May 23, 2013, by voice vote. She received her commission on May 28, 2013.

Legal offices
Preceded by Evan Wallach	Judge of the United States Court of International Trade; 2013–present	Incumbent
