= Jonathan Richardson (disambiguation) =

Jonathan Richardson or Johnathan Richardson, the Elder (1667–1745) was an English artist.

Jonathan Richardson may also refer to:

- Jonathan Richardson (MP) (1804–?), Irish politician
- Jonathan Joseph Richardson (died 1876), Irish politician
- Jonathan Richardson the Younger (1694–1771), painter, son of artist Jonathan Richardson
- Jonathan Richardson, 2011 winner of the motorcycle trial Scott Trial

== See also ==
- Jon Richardson (disambiguation)
- John Richardson (disambiguation)
