= Charles Frankel =

American philosopher (1917–1979)

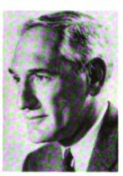

4th Assistant Secretary of State for Educational and Cultural Affairs
- In office September 15, 1965 – December 31, 1967
- Preceded by: Harry McPherson
- Succeeded by: Edward D. Re

Personal details
- Born: December 13, 1917 New York City, U.S.
- Died: May 10, 1979 (aged 61) Bedford Hills, New York, U.S.
- Spouse: Helen Beatrice Lehman
- Children: 2
- Education: Columbia University (BA, PhD); Mercer University (JD)
- Occupation: Diplomat, philosopher

Charles Frankel (December 13, 1917 – May 10, 1979) was an American philosopher, Assistant U.S. Secretary of State, professor and founding director of the National Humanities Center.

== Early life and personal life ==
Born into a Jewish family in New York City, he was the son of Abraham Philip and Estelle Edith (Cohen) Frankel. After attending Cornell University, Frankel received Bachelor of Arts with honors in English and philosophy from Columbia University in 1937. He then continued his education at the same university, earning a Doctor of Philosophy in 1946. During World War II, Frankel served as lieutenant in the United States Navy and in 1968 graduated from Mercer with a degree in law.

Frankel married Helen Beatrice Lehman on August 17, 1941. Together they raised two children, Susan and Carl. He was a member of the American Philosophical Association, the American Association of University Professors (chair of committee on professional ethics), the Institut International de Philosophie Politique, the Authors Guild, the Century Association, and Phi Beta Kappa.

== Career ==
Frankel joined the faculty of Columbia University in 1939 where in 1956, he attained position of full professor of philosophy. Prior to the position, he was awarded Guggenheim Fellowship in 1953 and in 1954 became visiting professor at the University of Paris on a Fulbright Scholarship. The same year he was awarded Fulbright Scholarship, Frankel served as Donnellan lecturer at Trinity College Dublin, and following it, served as a lecturer at Bennington and Bowdoin Colleges, as well as at Ohio University and the New York University Silver School of Social Work.

In 1960, Frankel became chief consulting editor of Current and the same year became a member of board of directors of the Civil Liberties Union of New York State (where he would remain until 1965). He became a member of the National Assembly for the Teaching of Principles of the Bill of Rights in 1962, and following it became a fellow of the Conference of Science, Philosophy and Religion.

On August 22, 1965, Frankel replaced Harry McPherson as Assistant Secretary of State for Educational and Cultural Affairs. He wrote on value theory, social philosophy and philosophy of history. The New York Times reported that as Assistant Secretary of State, he advocated for "major changes in our international educational and cultural programs." Frankel wanted to create a service of 'education officers' who would be sent abroad. In 1966, he led the American delegation to the UNESCO General Conference. Frankel resigned from his position in December 1967 in protest of the Vietnam War and intended to return to teaching at Columbia University. Immediately after retirement, he traveled to the Aspen Institute to write a book.

From 1973 to his death, he chaired the International Council on the Future of the University. In 1978 Frankel became the first president and founding director of the National Humanities Center in Research Triangle Park, North Carolina. At the time of his death, he was on leave as Columbia University's Old Dominion Professor of Philosophy and Public Affairs.

== Death ==
Frankel and his wife were fatally shot during a robbery of their home in Bedford Hills, New York, U.S. on May 10, 1979.

== Accolades and recognition ==
In recognition of his efforts, the National Endowment for the Humanities (NEH) awarded the Charles Frankel Prize from 1989 to 1996 to individuals making "outstanding contributions to the public's understanding of the humanities." A list of honorees can be found at the NEH website. In 1997 the prize was renamed The National Humanities Medal.

== Bibliography ==
- The Faith of Reason (1948)
- The Case for Modern Man (1956)
- The Democratic Prospect (1964)
- High on Foggy Bottom : an outsider's inside view of the Government (1969)
- Religion—Within Reason (1969)

== See also ==
- American philosophy

Government offices
Preceded by Harry McPherson	Assistant Secretary of State for Educational and Cultural Affairs; September 15, 1965 – December 31, 1967	Succeeded by Edward D. Re
