= Ray Price (speechwriter) =

American speechwriter (1930–2019)

White House Director of Speechwriting
- In office December 31, 1970 – February 6, 1973
- President: Richard Nixon
- Preceded by: Jim Keogh
- Succeeded by: David Gergen

Personal details
- Born: Raymond Kissam Price Jr. May 6, 1930 New York City, U.S.
- Died: February 13, 2019 (aged 88) New York City, U.S.
- Party: Republican
- Education: Yale University (BA)

Raymond Kissam Price Jr. (May 6, 1930 – February 13, 2019) was an American writer who was the chief speechwriter for U.S. President Richard Nixon, working on both inaugural addresses, his resignation speech, and Gerald Ford's pardon speech. After leaving politics, he was the long-time president of the Economic Club of New York, and worked as a consultant.

== Life and career ==
Price was born in Bay Ridge, Brooklyn to Raymond and Beth Price, née Porter. His father was a stockbroker. He was raised in Morris Plains, New Jersey, where he started an amateur newspaper. Price graduated from Yale University in 1951. There, he was a member of the Conservative Party of the Yale Political Union, belonged to Skull and Bones, and was one of the founding members of the reconstituted Calliopean Society. While at Yale, he also served as a research assistant to William F. Buckley Jr. during the latter's writing of God and Man at Yale and on Prescott Bush's unsuccessful 1950 Senate campaign.

Price served in the Navy during the Korean War. He began his journalism career at Collier's magazine in New York City, where he served as assistant to the editor from 1955 to 1957.

He then worked briefly as a reporter for Life magazine in 1957 before joining the New York Herald Tribune, also in New York City, where he was a member of the editorial staff from 1957 to 1964 and subsequently served as editor of the editorial page from 1964 to 1966.

Price became assistant to Richard M. Nixon in 1967, serving in that capacity through 1969, then as special assistant from 1969 to 1973, and as special consultant in 1973–1974 and again in 1980. He served as chief speechwriter for President Nixon throughout this period. During Nixon's presidential campaign of 1968, the candidate made use of the contrasting style of two speechwriters (the other being Pat Buchanan) with Price becoming known to colleagues as "Mr Outside" because his work was aimed at broadening Nixon's appeal. Price was renowned for his loyalty to Nixon, despite being a political moderate and an erstwhile supporter of Lyndon B. Johnson.

Price wrote a retrospective on the presidency titled With Nixon and assisted Nixon in the writing of several books. John Dean mentioned Price as one person suspected (falsely) of having been Deep Throat. For 19 years, Price was the president of the Economic Club of New York. After leaving the White House, he worked as an assistant to William S. Paley, operated a consulting firm, and served on a number of presidential commissions. He also was a Fellow at the John F. Kennedy Institute of Politics at Harvard University in 1977, and a visiting fellow at the American Enterprise Institute that same year. In 1978, he served as Nixon Professor at Whittier College in Whittier, California.

In 1992, Price briefly returned to speechwriting to pen George H.W. Bush's acceptance speech for the 1992 Republican nomination. he died of a stroke on February 13 2019 in new York at age 88

== Memberships ==
- Aurelian Honor Society
- Economic Club of New York
- Federal City Club
- Metropolitan Club
- Overseas Press Club of America
- Skull and Bones
- Calliopean Society
- Yale Club of New York City
- Union League Club of New York City
