= Philip H. Coombs =

American educator

1st Assistant Secretary of State for Educational and Cultural Affairs
- In office March 23, 1961 – June 4, 1962
- Preceded by: Position established
- Succeeded by: Lucius D. Battle

Personal details
- Born: 1915 Holyoke, Massachusetts
- Died: February 15, 2006 (aged 90–91) Chester, Connecticut
- Spouse: Helena (nee Brooks)
- Children: 2
- Education: Amherst College; University of Chicago

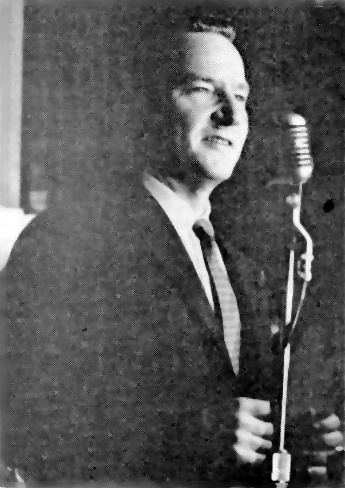
Coombs speaks at the Dance Magazine annual award ceremony, April 28, 1961.

Philip Hall Coombs (1915 at Holyoke, MA – February 15, 2006 in Chester, CT), was an American teacher. An undergraduate study was at Amherst College and post-grad work was at the University of Chicago. He taught economics at Williams College and was a program director for education at the Ford Foundation.

Coombs was appointed by President John F. Kennedy to be the first Assistant Secretary of State for Education and Culture in February, 1961. He was an advocate for overhauling the educational system, saying that every school district should put 2% of its money into educational research and hire a "Vice President in charge of heresy." During his stint in this post, he went to live in Paris, organizing the UNESCO International Institute for Educational Planning. This UNESCO-created group advised countries on improvements to their systems of education. Being dissatisfied with the pace of change, he resigned from the U.S. State Department in 1962 and, from 1963 to 1968, held the post of Director of the International Council of Economic Development (ICED). He served as vice-chair and chair of the ICED until 1992, when he retired.

During his career he wrote several books on foreign policy and education. He was married to Helena Brooks for 65 years and had two children, Peter B. Coombs and Helena H. Weeks.

== Published works ==
- Problems of economic mobilization (Industrial College of the Armed Forces, Washington, D.C. Economic mobilization course), by Philip H Coombs, 1947
- Education and Foreign Aid: Ways to Improve United States Foreign Educational Aid (from the Burton Lectures) by Philip H. Coombs, 1965
- The World Educational Crisis: A Systems Analysis, Oxford University Press, 1968
- Managing Educational Costs, by Philip H. Coombs and Jacques Hallak. 1972
- Attacking Rural Poverty: How Nonformal Education Can Help, A research report for the World Bank. Edited by Barbara Baird Israel, by Philip H. Coombs with Manzoor Ahmed, 1974
- Education for Rural Development (Praeger special studies in international economics and development) by Manzoor Ahmed and Philip H. Coombs, 1975
- Meeting the Basic Needs of the Rural Poor: The Integrated Community-Based Approach (Pergamon policy studies on international development), by Philip H. Coombs, 1980
- The World Crisis in Education: The View from the Eighties, by Philip H. Coombs, 1985
- Education and Foreign Aid: Ways to Improve United States Foreign Educational Aid (Burton Lectures) by Philip H. Coombs, 1988
- Fourth Dimension of Foreign Policy, by Philip H Coombs, 1990

Government offices
Preceded by New Office	Assistant Secretary of State for Educational and Cultural Affairs; March 23, 1961 – June 4, 1962	Succeeded by Lucius D. Battle
