= Richard Nolte =

American diplomat

Richard H. Nolte
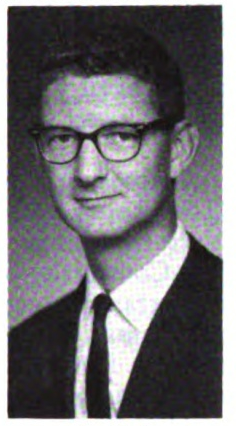
- Born: December 27, 1920; Duluth, Minnesota
- Died: November 22, 2007 (aged 86)
- Education: Yale University
- Occupation(s): Middle East expert and diplomat
- Spouse: Jeanne McQuarrie Nolte
- Children: four sons
- Parent(s): Julius and Mildred Miller Nolte

Richard H. Nolte (December 27, 1920 – November 22, 2007) was an American Middle East expert and diplomat. Nolte was the second director of the Institute of Current World Affairs. He was appointed ambassador to the United Arab Republic, which was the name of Egypt at the time, but never served due to the Six-Day War.

== Early life ==
Nolte was born on December 27, 1920, in Duluth, Minnesota, to Julius and Mildred Miller Nolte. He earned a bachelor's degree in European Studies at Yale University in 1943.

He served as a U.S. Navy pilot in World War II from 1943 to 1945 following his graduation. He returned to Yale following his discharge from the Navy and earned a master's degree in international relations in 1947. He earned a Rhodes Scholarship and began studying Arabic, Arab history and Islamic law at Oxford University in 1947.

== Career ==
Nolte and his wife lived in Beirut, Lebanon, from 1951 until 1957 thanks to a grant from the Institute of Current World Affairs. He also taught at Dartmouth College in the late 1950s before serving as a Middle East specialist for the American Universities Field Staff.

Nolte was appointed as the second executive director of the Institute of Current World Affairs in 1959, a position he held until 1978. (The ICWA was founded in 1925 by Walter Rogers). He often awarded fellowships not just to the traditional fields of diplomacy and journalism, but also to a wide array of disciplines such as music (Roger Reynolds) and dieticians (Andrew Weil). He was best known at the Institute for appointing its first woman fellow, Barbara Bright, a journalist who studied in Germany.

In 1963, Nolte published "The Modern Middle East." He wrote numerous articles on the Middle East in addition to this book.

U.S. President Lyndon Johnson named Nolte as the U.S. ambassador to Egypt in 1967 because of his expertise in Middle Eastern affairs. He arrived in Cairo on May 21, 1967. However, the Six-Day War broke out just two hours before Nolte was due to present his diplomatic credentials to Egyptian President Gamal Abdel Nasser on June 5, 1967. Nolte instead spent his first week in Cairo, Egypt, helping to arrange passage home for Americans stranded in Egypt by the war.

Nasser had refused to meet with Nolte because the United States had allied with Israel during the war. He was expelled from Egypt on June 10, 1967, just one day before the ceasefire which halted the war. The Washington Post later called Nolte's short three week term as ambassador "one of the shortest and most hectic diplomatic careers on record." Nolte reportedly expected to be offered another ambassadorship somewhere in the Middle East, but U.S. Secretary of State Dean Rusk refused to offer Nolte another position because he viewed Nolte as an Arabist.

Ironically, Nolte supported Nasser specifically and the Arab side of the conflict with Israel in general by producing diplomatic cables that argued the U.S. should ignore its pledge to Israel not to allow Egypt to cut off the Sinai Peninsula via the Straits of Tiran to Israeli vessels. According to Benjamin Foldy, when Egyptian officials suddenly agreed to meet with the U.S. and opened up an official embassy channel to get their demands to Washington, Nolte held talks with Egyptian government representatives on providing a "pro-Arab" response from Washington (providing recognition of the Egypt-Syrian United Arab Republic, declaring Israel to be the aggressor in the conflict, and drafting a UN Security Council resolution to force Israel to withdraw from any territories they had won in the conflict) to the disastrous results for Cairo as Egyptian forces were routed by Israelis. However, his recommendations to the State Department were completely ignored, as the incompetent work of Arabist diplomats before the war had left the Lyndon Johnson administration uninterested in listening to any of their suggestions.

Nolte served as the chairman of the American Geographical Society from 1988 to 1996. The American Geographical Society, founded in 1851, provides geographic consulting to American foreign policymakers. Nolte led the Society's 1978 negotiations with the University of Wisconsin–Madison, when the AGS transferred ownership of its maps and artifacts to the school.

He also served as a member of a number of other organizations concerned with international relations. Nolte served on the board of directors and as a past president of the Near East Foundation. He was also a member of the National Geographic Society, the Council on Foreign Relations, the Arctic Institute of North America and the Alicia Patterson Foundation. He also became an active board member of the National Aphasia Association after his wife, Jeanne McQuarrie Nolte, suffered a stroke and lost her ability to speak.

Nolte and 16 other former American diplomats wrote a letter to President George W. Bush in May 2004 to urge the President's administration to change its foreign policy in the Middle East. The letter criticized the George W. Bush administration for placing U.S. troops, diplomats and civilians "in an untenable and even dangerous position."

== Death ==
Richard Nolte died of complications from a stroke at his home in Hanover, New Hampshire, on November 22, 2007. He was 86 years old and was survived by his wife, Jeanne McQuarrie Nolte, and four sons.
