= Helen Andrews =

American political commentator

Helen Andrews (née Rittelmeyer) is an American conservative political commentator and author.

== Education ==
Andrews received a Bachelor of Arts in Religious studies from Yale University. At Yale, Andrews was a member of the Calliopean Society.

== Career ==
Andrews is a former senior editor at The American Conservative and the former managing editor of the Washington Examiner. While working at First Things, Andrews began writing Boomers, a book with the thesis that members of the "Baby Boomer" generation harmed American culture. The book chooses as its six examples Steve Jobs, Aaron Sorkin, Jeffrey Sachs, Camille Paglia, Al Sharpton, and Sonia Sotomayor.

From 2012-2017 she was a think tank researcher at Center for Independent Studies in Australia. She also won a Sydney Award in 2018 for her essay "Shame Storm" which explored online dynamics and cancel culture through a personal lens.

In January 2025 Commonplace magazine announced that they had brought Helen on as "our new features editor." Commonplace is a magazine launched by American Compass and is focused on right-of-center political, economic and cultural issues.

In September 2025, Andrews gave a speech at the National Conservatism Conference that was later turned into a widely discussed essay for Compact magazine. The essay argued that wokeness in American culture was driven by a "great feminization" as woman entered important positions in American society. She wrote that wokeness is fundamentally female, as it prioritizes "empathy over rationality, safety over risk, cohesion over competition."

== Critical reception ==
Richard Hanania said: "I like some of her stuff. I think that some of the stuff has the flaws of right-wing, starting with the conclusion and then looking for the story."

== Bibliography ==
- Rittelmeyer, Helen (2010). "The Smoker's Code". In Goldberg, Jonah (ed.). Proud to Be Right: Voices of the Next Conservative Generation. HarperCollins. ISBN 0061965731.
- Boomers: The Men and Women Who Promised Freedom and Delivered Disaster (Sentinel, 2021)
