= John Richardson Jr. =

American governmental official

6th Assistant Secretary of State for Educational and Cultural Affairs
- In office July 15, 1969 – March 7, 1977
- Preceded by: Edward D. Re
- Succeeded by: Joseph D. Duffey

Personal details
- Born: February 4, 1921 Boston, Massachusetts, U.S.
- Died: December 26, 2014 (aged 93) Bethesda, Maryland, U.S.
- Relations: Augustus Hemenway (maternal grandfather); Harriet Hemenway (maternal grandmother)
- Parent(s): John Richardson; Hope Richardson (nee Hemenway)
- Education: Harvard University

John Richardson Jr. (February 4, 1921 – December 26, 2014) was United States Assistant Secretary of State for Educational and Cultural Affairs from 1969 to 1977.

== Biography ==
John Richardson Jr. was born and raised in Boston, Massachusetts and educated at Harvard University. His parents were John Richardson, an attorney and Republican political figure and Hope Hemenway Richardson, the daughter of Augustus and Harriet Hemenway.

During World War II, Richardson served in the United States Army as a paratrooper. After the war, he became a lawyer at the Wall Street law firm of Sullivan & Cromwell. In 1955, he became an investment banker at Paine Webber. He joined the International Rescue Committee later in 1955, staying there until 1961. From 1961 to 1968, he was president of the National Committee for a Free Europe.

In 1969, President of the United States Richard Nixon nominated Richardson to be Assistant Secretary of State for Educational and Cultural Affairs and, after Senate confirmation, Richardson held that office from July 15, 1969, until March 7, 1977.

Upon leaving the United States Department of State in 1977, Richardon initially took a position with the Center for Strategic and International Studies, then served as president of Youth For Understanding from 1977 to 1986. In 1986, he became president of the United States Institute of Peace, holding that position until his retirement in 1989.

== Death ==
On December 26, 2014, Richardson died at the age of 93 in Bethesda, Maryland. His wife, Thelma, had died less than a month prior. He was survived by his daughters, grandchildren, and great-grandchildren.

== Other Resources ==
Interview from the Association for Diplomatic Studies and Training Foreign Affairs Oral History Project

Government offices
| Preceded by Edward D. Re | Assistant Secretary of State for Educational and Cultural Affairs; July 15, 1969 – March 7, 1977 | Succeeded by Joseph D. Duffy |
