= Calliopean Society =

Literary fraternity at Yale University, US

- ΦΕΜ
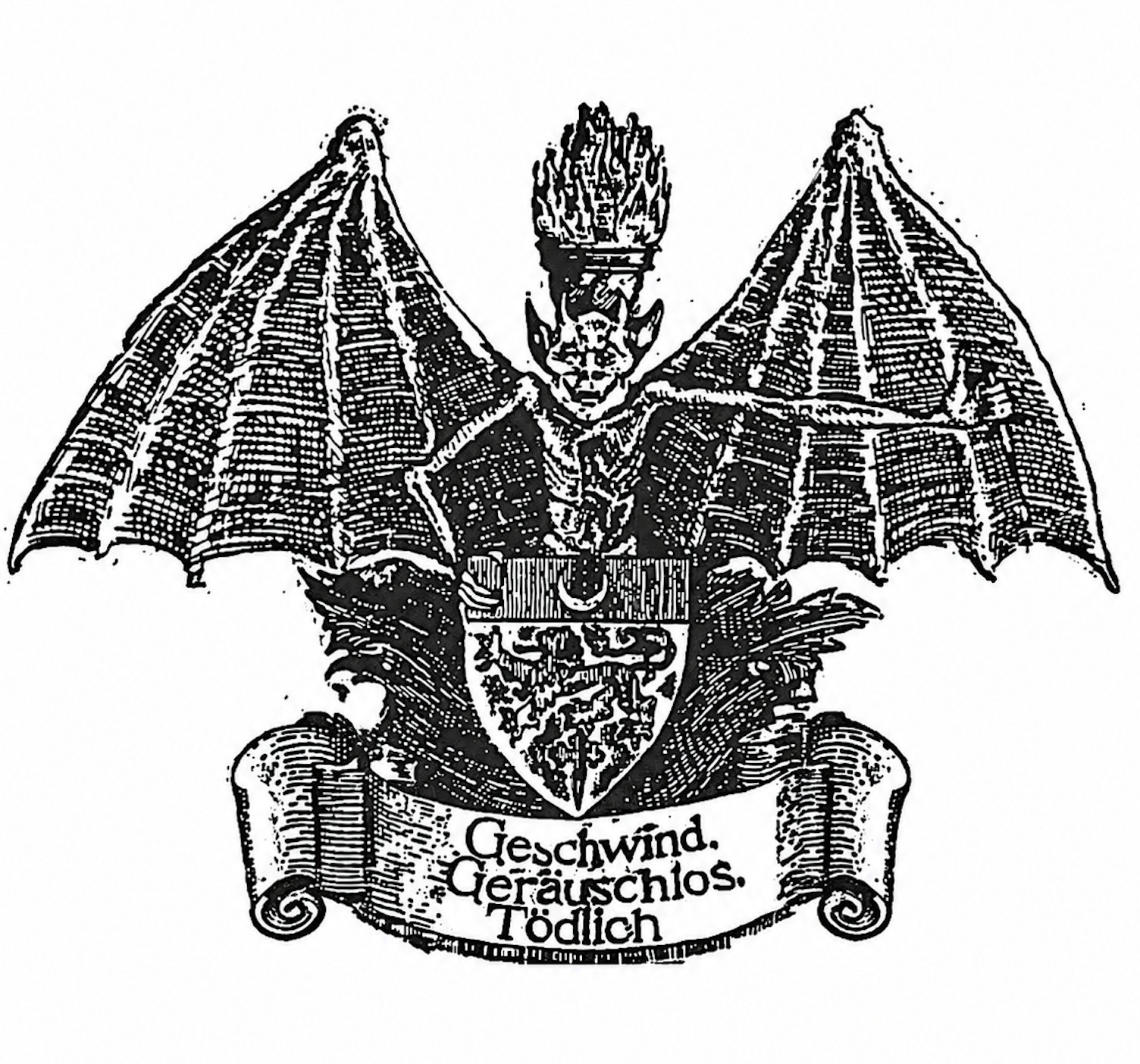
- 19th-century Calliopean Society emblem
- Founded: 1819; 207 years ago; revived 1950; Yale University
- Type: Secret
- Affiliation: Independent
- Status: Active
- Emphasis: Debate
- Scope: Local
- Motto: Geschwind, Geräuschlos, Tödlich.
- Patron Greek deity: Calliope
- Chapters: 1
- Other name: Fraternity of Phi Epsilon Mu
- Headquarters: 348 Elm Street; New Haven, Connecticut 06511; United States
- Website: www.calliopean.com

The Calliopean Society, also known as the Fraternity of Phi Epsilon Mu, is a secret society at Yale University in New Haven, Connecticut. It was established at Yale College in 1819 as a literary and debating society. It disbanded in 1853, and revived in 1950 as an discussion venue for conservative students. Its name refers to Calliope, the Greek muse of epic poetry.

== History ==
=== First incarnation: 1819–1853 ===
Calliopean was founded in 1819 by a group of members of Linonia dissatisfied with the result of an election for the presidency of the latter society. Another literary society of the same name had been formed in Bermuda in 1790 by George Tucker, at that time under the tutelage of Josiah Meigs, who later became professor of moral philosophy at Yale.

The Yale society held weekly debates, oratorial displays, and dramatic performances. Questions debated in the society's first two decades included “would it be beneficial to the United States to colonize the blacks?”, “should the tarif [sic] be abolished?”, and “ought negroes be permitted to vote?” Calliope established a library that grew to 6,000 volumes.

It was distinguished from rival societies Linonia and Brothers-In-Unity by a large proportion of membership from Southern states, along with a handful of members from slave societies further afield (such as Brazil). Several of its members owned slaves. Increasing sectional tensions, along with debt and membership issues, are thought to have caused Calliopean to disband in 1853.

=== Second incarnation: 1950 to date ===
The Calliopean Society was revived in 1950 as a forum for discussions of classics, culture, and contemporary social thought, and as a conservative alternative to liberal and left-wing viewpoints at Yale. Time identified the refounded Society, "nurtured [...] by William F. Buckley Jr." as a prominent player in the nascent campus conservative movement.

From the 1950s through the early 1960s, the Calliopean Society conducted a program of debates and meetings, featuring guest speakers. In 1974, it unsuccessfully arranged a debate between white nationalist William Shockley and black activist Roy Innis. The society also experienced a brief period where it served as a senior honorary society, modelled after the Aurelian Honor Society and Torch Honor Society. Traditionally, membership was limited to graduate students and undergraduate seniors.

For decades, the Calliopean Society had no physical location. During much of the 1970s and 1980s, the university gave the society use of a locked library located on the upper-levels of Bingham Hall.

The society is said to have continued in largely uninterrupted succession since its revival in 1950, its membership transmitted from one generation of students to the next. Beyond this, very little is known. Its current purposes remain obscure.

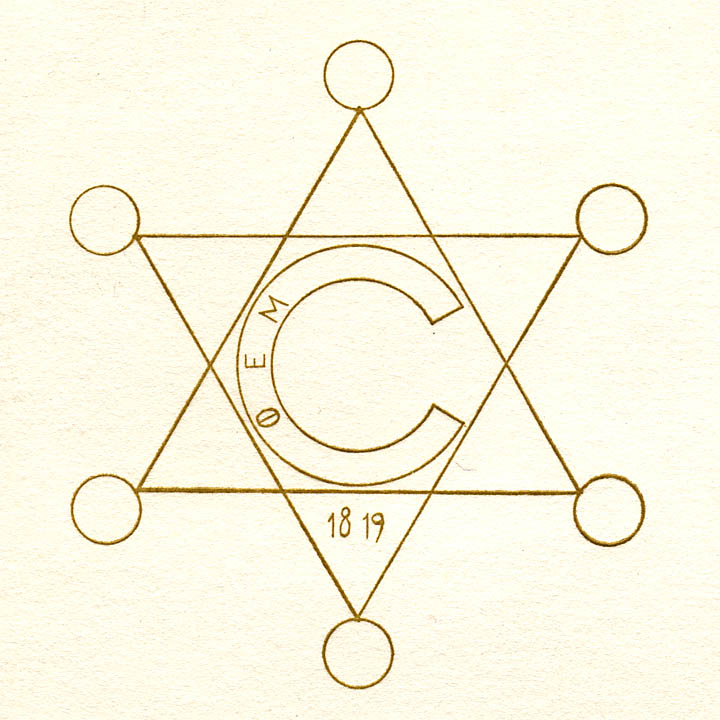
A historic emblem of the Calliopean Society

== Symbols ==
The society's name comes from Calliope, the Greek muse of epic poetry. The earliest symbol of the Calliopean Society was a hexagram with a "C" containing the Greek letters ΦΕΜ at its center. Another, later emblem showed the arms of Timothy Dwight IV supported by a torch and a devil-like figure holding a knife, with the German motto Geschwind. Geräuschlos. Tödlich ("Quick. Silent. Deadly"). It published The Mirror, which included stories and poetry written by its members.

== Legacy ==
Calliope is commemorated on the Yale University campus by Calliope Court, one of three small courtyards within Branford College.

== Notable members (second iteration) ==
- Helen Andrews, author and senior editor at The American Conservative
- Richard S. Arnold, former judge for the United States Court of Appeals for the Eighth Circuit
- Richard Brookhiser, author and senior editor at National Review
- Brian Carney, member of the editorial board at The Wall Street Journal
- Paul Gottfried, former professor at Elizabethtown College
- Peter Keisler, co-founder of the Federalist Society
- Walter Olson, senior fellow at the Cato Institute
- Eugene B. Meyer, president of the Federalist Society
- George Pataki, former governor of New York
- Robert Pollock, member of the editorial board at The Wall Street Journal
- Raymond Price, chief speechwriter for Richard Nixon
- Grover J. Rees III, U.S. ambassador to the Democratic Republic of East Timor
- Jerry Smith, judge for the United States Court of Appeals for the Fifth Circuit
- Matthias Storme, legal scholar and professor of law at Catholic University of Leuven

== See also ==
- Berkeley Forum
- Cambridge Union Society
- The Durham Union Society
- List of senior societies
- Oxford Union Society
- Queen's Debating Union
- Yale Debate Association
