= Assistant Secretary of State for Educational and Cultural Affairs =

U.S. government position

United States Assistant Secretary of State for Educational and Cultural Affairs
- Seal of the United States Department of State

- Flag of an assistant secretary of state

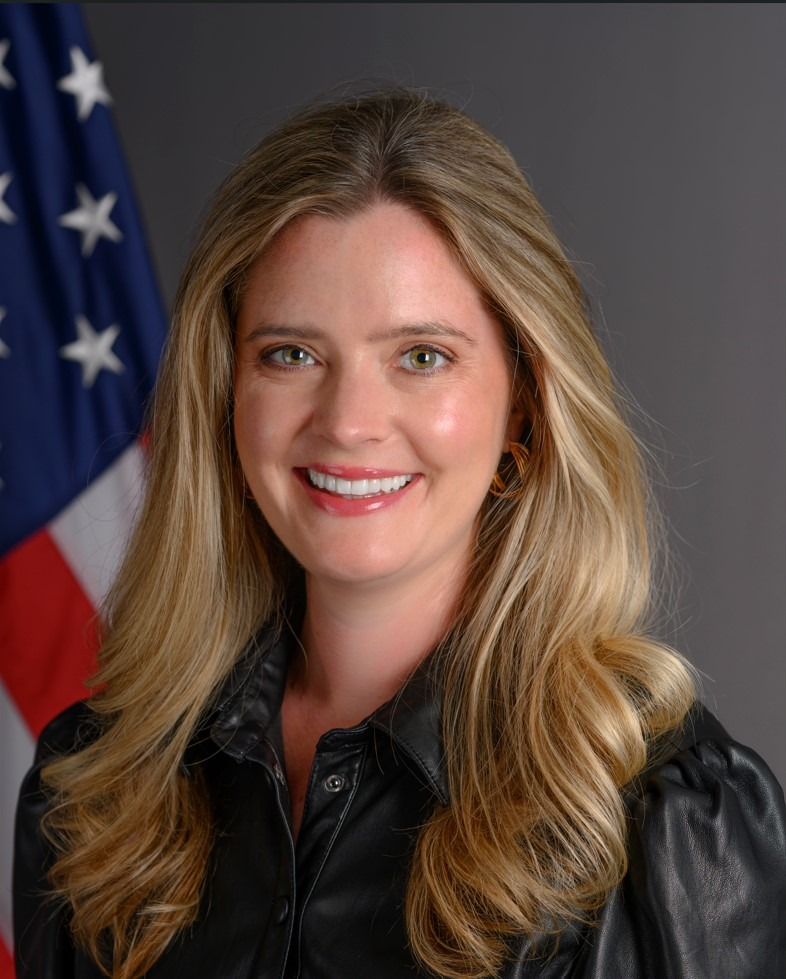
- Incumbent; Catherine Dillon since May 18, 2026
- Reports to: The under secretary for public diplomacy and public affairs
- Nominator: The president of the United States
- Inaugural holder: Philip Hall Coombs
- Formation: 1961
- Website: Official website

The assistant secretary of state for educational and cultural affairs is the head of the Bureau of Educational and Cultural Affairs, a bureau within the United States Department of State. The assistant secretary of state for educational and cultural affairs reports to the under secretary of state for public diplomacy and public affairs.

== Assistant secretaries of state for educational and cultural affairs, 1961—present ==
Note: the post had been abolished from 1978 to 1999. In 1978 the Bureau was abolished and its functions transferred to the International Communications Agency (subsequently the United States Information Agency) under Reorganization Plan No. 2 (91 Stat. 1637). On October 1, 1999, pursuant to the integration of the U.S. Information Agency into the Department of State this position was revived.

#	Name	Assumed office	Left office	President(s) served under
1	Philip Hall Coombs	March 23, 1961	June 4, 1962	John F. Kennedy
2	Lucius D. Battle	June 5, 1962	August 20, 1964	John F. Kennedy, Lyndon B. Johnson
3	Harry McPherson	August 23, 1964	August 14, 1965	Lyndon B. Johnson
4	Charles Frankel	September 15, 1965	December 31, 1967	Lyndon B. Johnson
5	Edward D. Re	February 28, 1968	January 9, 1969	Lyndon B. Johnson
6	John Richardson Jr.	July 15, 1969	March 7, 1977	Richard Nixon, Gerald Ford
7	Joseph D. Duffey	April 8, 1977	March 21, 1978	Jimmy Carter
8	Alice Stone Ilchman	March 22, 1978	March 31, 1978	Jimmy Carter
-	Position abolished			
9	William B. Bader	November 18, 1999	January 20, 2001	Bill Clinton
10	Patricia Harrison	October 2, 2001	July 1, 2005	George W. Bush
11	Dina Powell	July 11, 2005	June 7, 2007	George W. Bush
12	Goli Ameri	March 19, 2008	January 20, 2009	George W. Bush
13	Ann Stock	June 23, 2010	August 16, 2013	Barack Obama
14	Evan Ryan	September 26, 2013	January 6, 2017	Barack Obama
-	Mark Taplin (acting)	January 2017	August 2017	Donald Trump
-	Jennifer Zimdahl Galt (acting)	November 13, 2017	March 29, 2018	Donald Trump
15	Marie Royce	March 30, 2018	January 20, 2021	Donald Trump
-	Matthew Lussenhop (acting)	January 20, 2021	November 22, 2021	Joe Biden
16	Lee Satterfield	November 23, 2021	January 20, 2025	Joe Biden
-	Scott Weinhold (acting)	January 20, 2025	February 4, 2025	Donald Trump
-	Darren Beattie (acting)	February 4, 2025	May 18, 2026	Donald Trump
17	Catherine Dillon	May 18, 2026	Present	Donald Trump
