= John S. Richardson (zoologist) =

Canadian zoologist and academic

- Occupations: Scientist and an academic

Academic background
- Education: B.Sc., Zoology; M.Sc., Zoology; Ph.D., Zoology
- Alma mater: University of Toronto; University of Alberta; University of British Columbia

Academic work
- Institutions: University of British Columbia

John S. Richardson is a Canadian scientist and an academic. He is an Emeritus Professor at the University of British Columbia.

Richardson is known for his research on meta-ecosystems, stream and riparian area ecology, community and population ecology, and the biology of benthic invertebrates, amphibians, and fish. Moreover, his works have been published in academic journals such as Ecology, Journal of Applied Ecology, and BioScience.

== Education ==
Richardson earned his B.Sc. in Zoology from the University of Toronto in 1979. He went on to receive his M.Sc. in Zoology from the University of Alberta in 1983, followed by a Ph.D. in Zoology from the University of British Columbia in 1989.

== Career ==
Richardson began his career as an NSERC Postdoctoral Fellow at Simon Fraser University from 1989 to 1991. In 1992, he held a limited-term appointment as Assistant Professor at the same institution before serving as a Visiting Scientist with the Department of Fisheries and Oceans in 1993. He rejoined the University of British Columbia in 1994 as a Research Associate. He was appointed Assistant Professor in 1996, promoted to Associate Professor in 2002, and advanced to Professor in 2007, serving in that capacity until 2023. He has been on many committees, most notably COSEWIC (2014 to present). Since 2004, he has been an Associate of the Peter Wall Institute for Advanced Studies. In 2023, he was appointed Professor Emeritus.

== Research ==
Richardson has studied the controls on processes linking adjacent ecosystems, using small streams and their riparian zones as a model system. This included experiments to determine if seasonal leaf litter input affected stream detritivores and found that increased food boosted shredder density, growth, and biomass, confirming that food limitation influenced productivity and community structure. His work with colleagues has also examined how hydraulic conditions and sediment characteristics in the Fraser River and smaller streams influenced macroinvertebrate distribution, showing species aligned with physical habitat gradients shaped by flow dynamics, sediment texture, and organic matter availability. In a collaborative study with Takashi Gomi and others, he explored the ecological and hydrological significance of headwater systems, highlighted their roles in nutrient cycling, biodiversity, and habitat provision, and emphasized the need to better understand their spatial and temporal dynamics.

Richardson's work has extended to studying the effects of land use, including forestry and urbanization, on small streams and riparian areas. In a watershed-scale experiment of how riparian buffer widths affected stream ecosystems after logging, he and his colleagues found that narrower buffers increased light, temperature, algae, and insect abundance. In contrast, 30-meter buffers helped protect ecological integrity. In another study, his research team and Richardson analyzed 115 data sets to assess how cross-habitat resource subsidies affected consumer populations, finding inconsistent responses but highlighting the subsidy-to-local-resource ratio as a better predictor than habitat productivity. While investigating how warming, nutrient enrichment, and predators interacted to affect energy and organism flow between aquatic and terrestrial ecosystems, his team showed that these factors jointly influenced emergence, decomposition, phenology, and carbon cycling. In 2025, Richardson and his colleagues examined ecological roles of scavengers in freshwater ecosystems, focusing on their contributions to energy and water transfer, water quality, and ecosystem functioning. They further examined how human activities affect scavenger communities, identifying management strategies to help in mitigating these impacts.

Richardson contributed to a global river carbon processing study using a standardized experiment at 1000+ sites, revealing latitude-based patterns driven by temperature and nutrients. Furthermore, they reviewed major inland freshwater habitat types, highlighting their biodiversity, ecological features, human impacts, and conservation challenges, while emphasizing resilience, climate threats, and ecosystem connectivity for effective biodiversity stewardship. Moreover, he also participated in a global plant matter decomposition experiment in streams using cellulose assays across 514 sites, identified key drivers, predicted decomposition with high accuracy, and mapped rates showing rapid breakdown in human-impacted regions.

== Selected articles ==
- Addicott, J. F., Aho, J. M., Antolin, M. F., Padilla, D. K., Richardson, J. S., & Soluk, D. A. (1987). Ecological neighborhoods: scaling environmental patterns. Oikos, 340-346.
- Gomi, T., Sidle, R. C., & Richardson, J. S. (2002). Understanding processes and downstream linkages of headwater systems: headwaters differ from downstream reaches by their close coupling to hillslope processes, more temporal and spatial variation, and their need for different means of protection from land use. BioScience, 52(10), 905-916.
- Kiffney, P. M., Richardson, J. S., & Bull, J. P. (2003). Responses of periphyton and insects to experimental manipulation of riparian buffer width along forest streams. Journal of Applied Ecology, 40(6), 1060-1076.
- Marczak, L. B., Thompson, R. M., & Richardson, J. S. (2007). Meta‐analysis: trophic level, habitat, and productivity shape the food web effects of resource subsidies. Ecology, 88(1), 140-148.
- Wipfli, M. S., Richardson, J. S., & Naiman, R. J. (2007). Ecological linkages between headwaters and downstream ecosystems: Transport of organic matter, invertebrates, and wood down headwater channels 1. JAWRA Journal of the American Water Resources Association, 43(1), 72-85.
