= 1970 United States Senate election in Montana =

- November 3, 1970
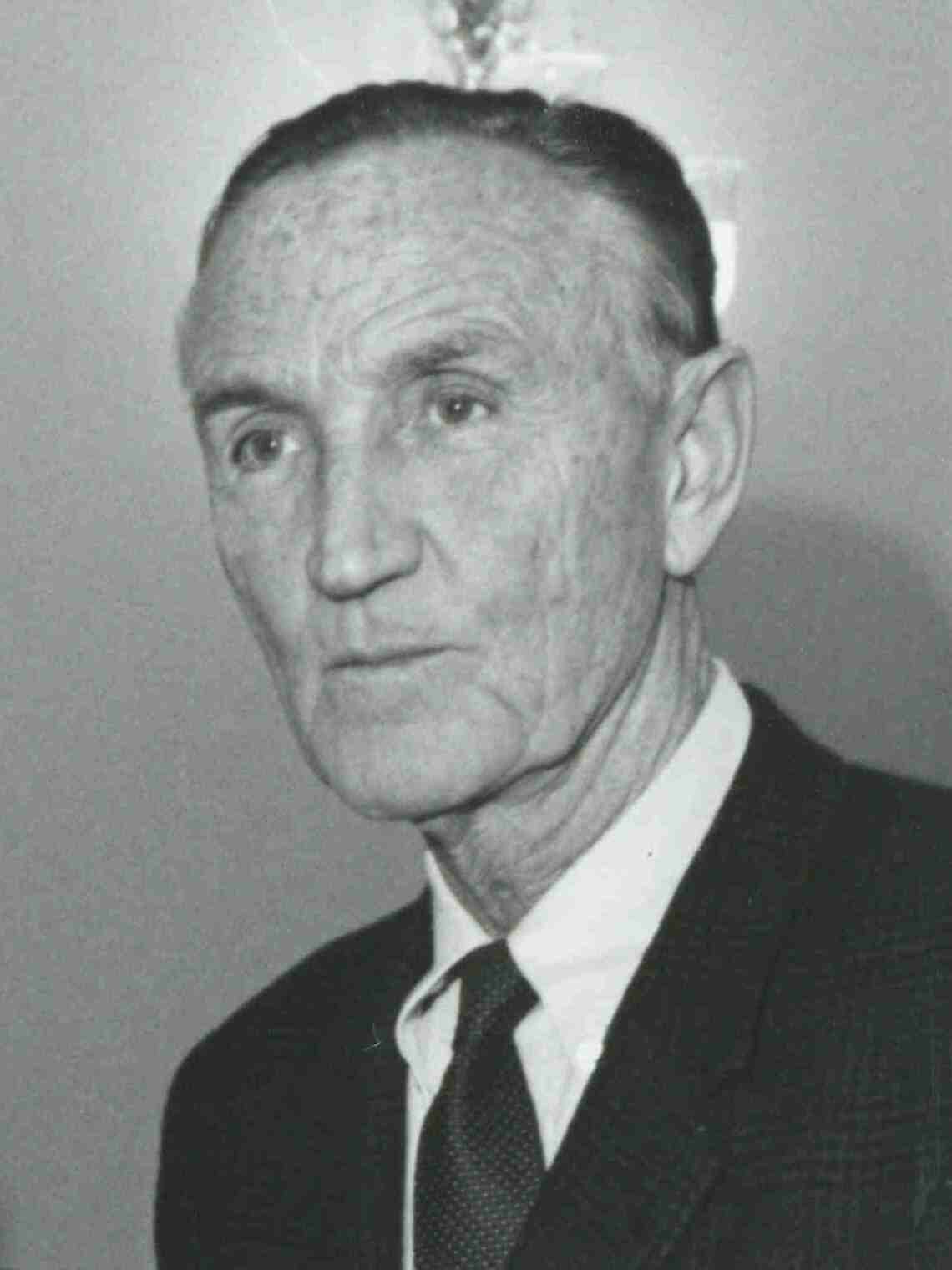

Nominee	Mike Mansfield	Harold E. Wallace
Party	Democratic	Republican
Popular vote	150,060	97,809
Percentage	60.54%	39.46%
- County results Mansfield: 50–60% 60–70% 70–80% Wallace: 50–60% 60–70%
U.S. senator before election
Mike Mansfield
Democratic
Elected U.S. Senator
Mike Mansfield
Democratic

The 1970 United States Senate election in Montana took place on November 3, 1970. Incumbent U.S. Senator Mike Mansfield, the sitting Senate majority leader who was first elected to the Senate in 1952 and was re-elected in 1958 and 1964, ran for re-election. Mansfield won the Democratic primary against several opponents, and advanced to the general election, where he was opposed by Harold E. Wallace, a sporting goods salesman and the Republican nominee. While his margin of victory decreased slightly from 1964, Mansfield still managed to defeat Wallace in a landslide, winning his fourth and final term in the Senate.

== Democratic primary ==
=== Candidates ===
- Mike Mansfield, incumbent United States Senator
- Tom McDonald
- John W. Lawlor, rancher

=== Results ===
Democratic Party primary results
Party	Candidate	Votes	%
Democratic	Mike Mansfield (incumbent)	68,146	77.17
Democratic	Tom McDonald	10,773	12.20
Democratic	John W. Lawlor	19,384	10.63
Total votes		88,303	100.00

== Republican primary ==
=== Candidates ===
- Harold E. Wallace, sporting goods salesman

=== Results ===
Republican Primary results
Party	Candidate	Votes	%
Republican	Harold E. Wallace	45,549	100.00
Total votes		45,549	100.00

== General election ==
=== Results ===
United States Senate election in Montana, 1970
Party	Candidate	Votes	%	±%
Democratic	Mike Mansfield (incumbent)	150,060	60.54	▼3.97
Republican	Harold E. Wallace	97,809	39.46	▲3.97
Majority		52,251	21.08	▼7.95
Turnout		247,869		
Democratic hold		Swing	▼3.97	

== See also ==
- United States Senate elections, 1970
