= Oculus =

Oculus (a term from Latin oculus, meaning 'eye'), may refer to the following:

== Architecture ==
- Oculus (architecture), a circular opening in the centre of a dome or in a wall

== Arts, entertainment, and media ==
- Oculus (film), a 2013 American supernatural psychological horror film directed by Mike Flanagan
- Oculus (perspective), the point in space where a viewer sees a scene to be depicted in a picture plane
- Oculus, art installation by Kristin Jones and Andrew Ginzel at the Chambers Street–World Trade Center/Park Place subway station in Lower Manhattan, New York City
- Occulus, a fictional super-villain in Marvel Comics

== New York City transit stations ==
In Lower Manhattan, New York City, the Oculus is the name of the head houses for the following transit stations:

- Fulton Center
- World Trade Center Transportation Hub
  - Westfield World Trade Center, a mall within the World Trade Center Transportation Hub, also referred to as the Oculus

== Technology ==
- Oculus (brand), a division of Meta Platforms that develops the Oculus Rift device and related technologies
  - Oculus Rift, a PC based virtual reality device
  - Oculus Rift S, a PC based virtual reality device, successor to the Oculus Rift
  - Oculus Quest, a standalone virtual reality device
  - Meta Quest 2, launched as Oculus Quest 2, a standalone virtual reality device, successor to the Oculus Quest
  - Meta Quest 3, a successor to the Oculus Quest 2
  - Meta Quest 3S, an entry level model, part of the third generation of the Meta Quest line

== See also ==
- Eye, an organ of the visual system
- Occult, the study of a deeper spiritual reality that extends beyond pure reason and the physical sciences
- Ocular (disambiguation)
