= Radicalism in the United States =

Historical American ideology

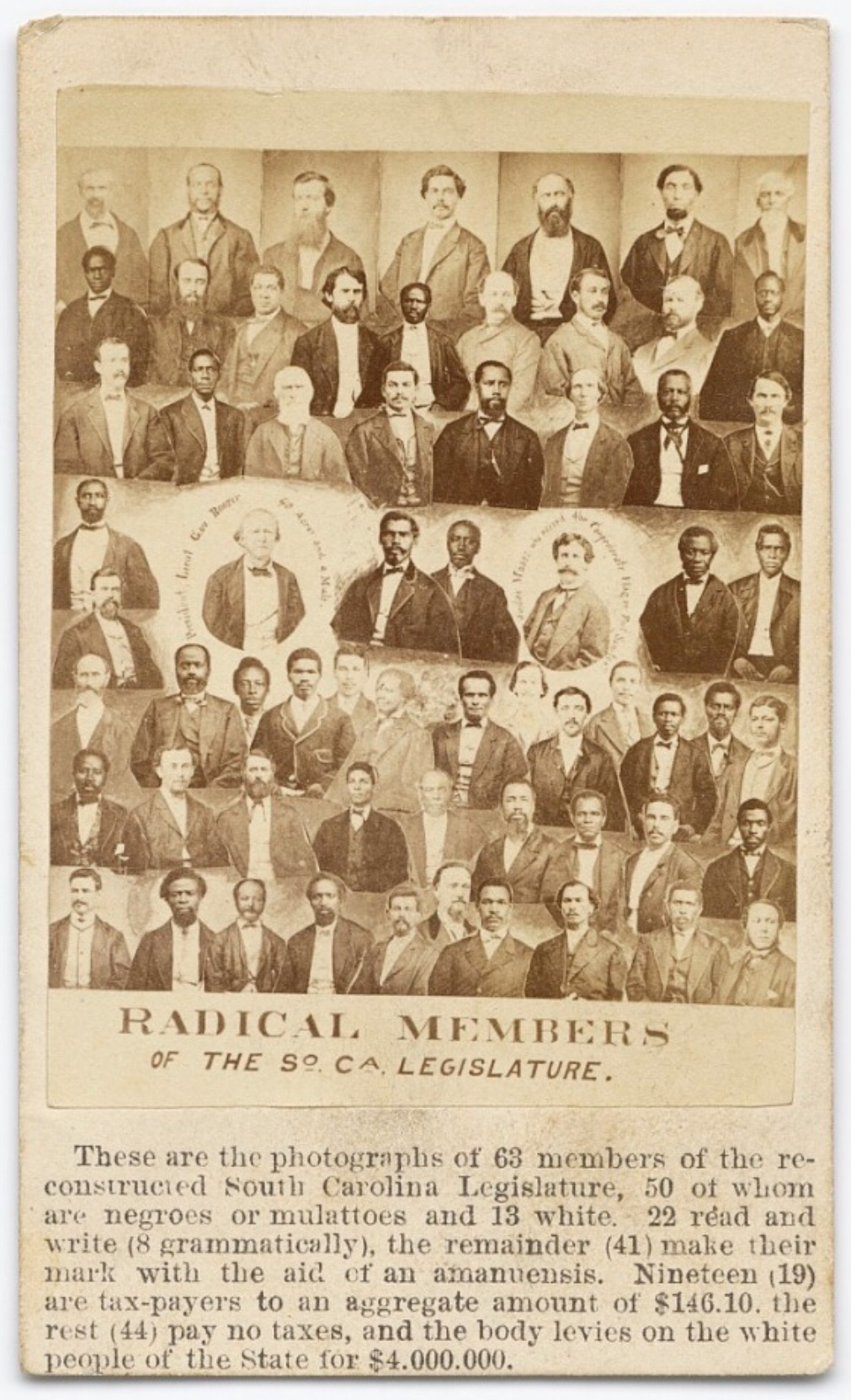
A composite image of 63 "Radical Republicans" in the South Carolina Legislature in 1868 including 50 "negroes or mullatoes"

"Radicalism" or "radical liberalism" was a political ideology in the 19th century United States aimed at increasing political and economic equality. The ideology was rooted in a belief in the power of the ordinary man, political equality, and the need to protect civil liberties.

== Overview ==
Upon the founding of the United States, many ideas later associated with Radicalism were staples of American political life, though not to the same degree. For example, while separation of church and state was enshrined in the first amendment, many states continued not allowing "blasphemers" to run for office and paid churches out of the public treasury. This is primarily due to the fact that before the passage of the 14th Amendment after the civil war, the Bill of Rights was widely considered to only restrict the actions of the Federal Government rather than being rights that applied equally to every citizen in all cases. Additionally, many states had wealth and property requirements for voting. Most property requirements were done away with by the 1820s, with North Carolina being the last state to do so in 1856. Most importantly, slavery was an important facet of the American economy, something unacceptable to most Radicals.

A founding father widely considered to be Radical is Thomas Paine, the writer of the pamphlets Common Sense and The American Crisis who would later go on to play an important role in the French Revolution.

One of the first major factions that might be characterized as radical are the Jeffersonian Republicans, and by extension the various Democratic-Republican Societies and the Democratic-Republican Party that rallied behind Thomas Jefferson. The party believed in expansionism, social mobility, frequently defended the French Revolution until Napoleon took power, and, though open to some redistributive measures, saw a strong centralized government as a threat to freedom.

The Radical faction of the Democratic-Republican party eventually became the Democrats, a populist political movement that advocated for the political equality of white men. A faction of the Democrats that could be characterized as Radical is the Locofocos, originally known as the Equal Rights Party. They were vigorous advocates for laissez-faire economics and trade unionism, and were opposed to state banks and monopolies.

While Slavery was becoming a more divisive issue among Americans, the term "Radical" eventually became synonymous with Northerners opposed to Slave Power. Many abolitionist Democrats, called "Barnburners" in New York, began leaving the party in favor of others, such as the Free Soil Party, during this period. These abolitionist Democrats, Conscience Whigs and European Revolutionaries, fleeing after the largely unsuccessful Revolutions of 1848, eventually formed the backbone of the Radical faction of the Republican party.

While Radical Republicans were not unified in regards to many issues in their early years, they were unified in their desire for the immediate complete abolition of slavery, belief in the predominance of Free Labor (both agricultural and industrial) over Slave Labor, support of Land Reform, suffrage expansion, opposition to the Southern Aristocracy, and belief in civil rights for emancipated slaves.

The ideology reached its peak relevance during the Reconstruction period following the Civil War. Radical Republicans sought to guarantee civil rights for African Americans, ensure that the former Confederate states had limited power in the federal government, and promote free market capitalism in the South in place of a slave based economy. Many Radical Republicans were also supportive of Labor Unions, though this element would fade over time. Many liberal Radical Republicans, (Liberal in this case meaning pro-free trade, civil service reform, federalism, and generally soft money) such as Charles Sumner and Lyman Turnbull, eventually began to leave the faction for other parties and Republican factions as Reconstruction wore on to a point considered excessive and the corruption of many hardliners became evident. These Liberal Republicans would try to appeal to racists, and their successors would abandon racial equality altogether.

The remaining radicals after this came to be referred to as the Stalwarts, and were from thereon marked primarily their advocacy of spoils system politics and African-American civil rights. It was eventually succeeded as a liberal egalitarian left leaning ideology by Populism and later Progressivism.

According to Gene Clanton's study of Kansas from 1880s to 1910s, populism and progressivism in Kansas had similarities but different policies and distinct bases of support. Both opposed corruption and trusts. Populism emerged earlier and came out of the farm community. It was radically egalitarian in favor of the disadvantaged classes; it was weak in the towns and cities except in labor unions. Progressivism, on the other hand, was a later movement. It emerged after the 1890s from the urban business and professional communities. Most of its activists had opposed populism. It was elitist, and emphasized education and expertise. Its goals were to enhance efficiency, reduce waste, and enlarge the opportunities for upward social mobility. However, some former Populists changed their emphasis after 1900 and supported progressive reforms.

Theodore Roosevelt and Woodrow Wilson were referred to as radicalist because they supported social-liberal reforms.

== Timeline ==
1824: The Jacksonian faction of the Democratic-Republicans is formed after the Presidential Election of that year.

1826: The Jacksonian Democratic Party is formed.

1828: Andrew Jackson wins the 1828 Presidential Election. This is the first election in which non-property-owning white males can vote in most states.

1832: Andrew Jackson is re-elected.

1833: The American Anti-Slavery Society is founded by William Lloyd Garrison, Arthur Tappan, and Frederick Douglass.

1835: The Locofoco faction of the Democratic Party is established.

1836: Andrew Jackson's secretary of state, Martin Van Buren, wins the 1836 Presidential Election.

1840: The abolitionist Liberty Party is formed.

1848: The Mexican–American War is won, making the westward expansion of slavery a prominent political issue. The Free Soil Party, opposed to the expansion of slavery, is formed, attracting the votes of many anti-slavery Democrats.

1850: The Compromise of 1850 is passed, temporarily settling the issue of slavery, but infuriating many who were pro-slavery and anti-slavery.

1854: The Kansas–Nebraska Act is passed, leading to Bleeding Kansas and the breakup of the Whig Party. The Republican Party, and by extension the Radical Republican faction, is formed.

1860: Republican abolitionist Abraham Lincoln wins the Presidential Election, serving as the catalyst for the Civil War.

1864: The Radical Democratic Party forms to oppose Lincoln in the 1864 election, but later drops out due to not wanting to act as a spoiler. Abraham Lincoln is re-elected.

1865: Passage of the Thirteenth Amendment. Abraham Lincoln is assassinated, with the Thirteenth being ratified after his death. His vice president, Southern Unionist Andrew Johnson, is sworn into office. The Civil War ends.

1867: The National Grange of the Order of Patrons of Husbandry is formed.

1868: Republican Ulysses S. Grant, aligned with the Radical Republicans, wins the presidential election. The Radical-controlled Congress passes the Fourteenth Amendment.

1869: Tennessee's Reconstruction government collapses as DeWitt Clinton Senter is elected governor; Virginia's Reconstruction government collapses as Gilbert C. Walker is elected governor.

1870: Republicans disillusioned with the extent of Reconstruction and the corruption of the Republicans form the Liberal Republican Party. The Fifteenth Amendment, giving African Americans the right to vote, is ratified. The Enforcement Act of 1870 is passed to protect the new voting rights of African Americans and fight white supremacist paramilitary groups like the Ku Klux Klan.

1871: Georgia's Reconstruction government collapses as Democratic nominee James M. Smith is elected governor.

1872: Grant is re-elected by a landslide, causing the Liberal Republicans to disband.

1873: The Anti-Monopoly Party is formed. Texas's Reconstruction government collapses as Democratic nominee Richard Coke is elected governor.

1874: The Greenback Party is formed. Arkansas's Reconstruction government collapses as Democratic nominee Augustus H. Garland is elected governor; Alabama's Reconstruction government collapses as Democratic nominee George S. Houston is elected governor.

1875: The Southern Farmers' Alliance is formed.

1876: Mississippi's Reconstruction government collapses as Democrat John Marshall Stone becomes governor; North Carolina's Reconstruction government collapses as Democratic nominee Zebulon B. Vance is elected governor; Florida's Reconstruction government collapses as Democratic nominee George Franklin Drew is elected governor.

1877: The Northern Farmers' Alliance is formed. Louisiana's Reconstruction government collapses as Democrat Francis T. Nicholls becomes governor. South Carolina's Reconstruction government collapses as Democrat Wade Hampton III becomes governor. Rutherford B. Hayes is sworn into office, and with the Democratic Party holding the House of Representatives, Reconstruction and federal protection of the African American population in the South come to an end.

1880: Ulysses S. Grant fails to win a third Republican nomination.

1881: The Readjuster Party is formed.

1886: The Colored Farmers' Alliance is formed.

1890: The Sherman Antitrust Act is signed into law, making cartels and certain anti-competitive actions illegal.

1892: The Farmers' Alliances form a third party, the People's Party, also known as the Populist Party. While it initially tries to win the black vote from the Republicans, much of it would eventually gain a more white supremacist character. They would go on to win 11 House seats, 3 Senate seats, and the Colorado governorship in the following midterms.

1894: The Republican and Populist parties of North Carolina begin collaborating via electoral fusion. This coalition included African Americans, causing significant gains for civil rights in the state.

1896: The Populist Party nominates Democratic nominee William Jennings Bryan for President after his Cross of Gold speech, though with a different vice president. This proves to be disastrous for the party, with the Democrats significantly sapping away at the base of the Populists. The Populists would never recover from this and would be a shadow of their former selves.

1898: The Democrats launch a white supremacy campaign against the biracial fusionist North Carolina government, culminating in the massacre of Wilmington's black population and overthrow of the local government.

1900: The first President of the Progressive Era, William McKinley, is elected.

1901: William McKinley is assassinated, and his progressive vice president, Theodore Roosevelt, enters office.

1903: Passage of the Elkins Act to enable the imposition of heavy fines upon railways. W.E.B. Du Bois openly criticizes Booker T. Washington for his accommodationist philosophy.

1904: Theodore Roosevelt is re-elected.

1905: Theodore Roosevelt tours the South as part of his appeal to the Solid South, in conjunction with a decrease in African-American patronage by the Republican Party in the South.

1906: Passage of the Pure Food and Drug Act, the first of a series of consumer protection laws. The 1906 Atlanta race massacre sees Roosevelt take little action to stop the racial violence, believing both sides were to blame.

1908: Theodore Roosevelt's hand-picked successor, William Howard Taft, is elected president.

1910: The United States Postal Savings System is established.

1912: Theodore Roosevelt, perceiving the Republican Party as not progressive enough, forms the Progressive Party, but, alongside incumbent Taft, loses in a landslide to progressive Democrat Woodrow Wilson in the 1912 election. Eugene V. Debs wins 6.0% of the popular vote.

1913: Beginning of The New Freedom; the Sixteenth Amendment is ratified, allowing a federal-level progressive income tax. The Seventeenth Amendment is ratified, making senators directly elected. Albert S. Burleson, William Gibbs McAdoo, and Josephus Daniels segregate the Post Office, Treasury, and Navy Departments, respectively.

1914: The Clayton Antitrust Act and Federal Trade Commission Act of 1914 are passed, outlawing certain unfair trade practices and monopolies; passage of the La Follette–Peters Act, regulating female working times to eight hours in the District of Columbia.

1916: Passage of the Keating–Owen Act, regulating child labour until being struck down in Hammer v. Dagenhart; Woodrow Wilson is re-elected.

1918: Woodrow Wilson urges Congress to pass the female suffrage amendment.

1919: The Nineteenth Amendment is passed, granting women the right to vote, though it would not be ratified until 1920.

1920: Passage of the Women's Bureau Act of 1920 to "formulate standards and policies which shall promote the welfare of wage-earning women, improve their working conditions, increase their efficiency, and advance their opportunities for profitable employment." Progressive Democrat James M. Cox is defeated in a landslide by conservative Warren G. Harding in the 1920 election. Eugene V. Debs wins 3.41% of the vote, though imprisoned at the time.

1920s: Incorporation of the Bill of Rights begins, making state and local governments required to respect constitutional rights.

1924: Robert M. La Follette runs under the Progressive Party name, but comes in third place incumbent Republican President Calvin Coolidge and Democratic presidential candidate John W. Davis in the 1924 election.

1928: Al Smith becomes the first Catholic nominee for President, though he faces attacks on his faith and loses in a landslide to Herbert Hoover in the 1928 election. Left-wing populist Huey Long is elected governor of Louisiana.

1930: Huey Long is elected senator from Louisiana.

1932: Franklin Roosevelt defeats incumbent Herbert Hoover in an overwhelming landslide in the 1932 election, though the tradition of western and populist radicalism begins to decline through the creation of the institutional New Deal Coalition and the rise of the conservative coalition.

1934: The Share Our Wealth agenda is proposed in a national broadcast by Huey Long.

1935: Huey Long is assassinated by Carl Weiss.

1938: Wisconsin Progressive Philip La Follette is defeated by Republican Julius P. Heil in the Wisconsin gubernatorial election.

1942: Independent George W. Norris is defeated by Republican Kenneth S. Wherry in the Nebraska Senate election.

1946: Republican Joseph McCarthy is elected after primarying Robert La Follette Jr. in the Wisconsin Senate election. Burton K. Wheeler is primaried by Leif Erickson, who goes on to lose to Republican Zales Ecton in the Montana Senate election.

1948: Henry A. Wallace runs third-party Progressive in the 1948 election, but loses and only garners 2.37% of the vote.

1952: Progressive Republican Wayne Morse becomes an Independent following the election of Dwight D. Eisenhower in 1952. The tradition of western and populist radicalism comes to an end, though the fight for civil rights and economic progressivism continues.

== Sources ==
- Brown, David (1999). "Jeffersonian Ideology and the Second Party System". The Historian. 62 (1): 17–30. doi:10.1111/j.1540-6563.1999.tb01431.x. JSTOR 24450533.
- Engerman, Stanley L.; Sokoloff, Kenneth L. (February 2005). "The Evolution of Suffrage Institutions in the New World" (PDF). Yale Workshops and Seminars.
- Reichley, A. James (2000) [1992]. The Life of the Parties: A History of American Political Parties (Paperback ed.). Rowman & Littlefield Publishers. ISBN 0-7425-0888-9.
- Summers, Mark Wahlgren (1994). The Press Gang: Newspapers and Politics, 1865-1878. University of North Carolina Press. ISBN 978-0807844465.
- Wilentz, Sean (2005). The Rise of American Democracy: Jefferson to Lincoln. W. W. Norton & Company. ISBN 0-393-05820-4.
