= Maureen and Mike Mansfield Library =

University of Montana library

Coordinates: 46.8593°N 113.983°W

Maureen and Mike Mansfield Library University of Montana
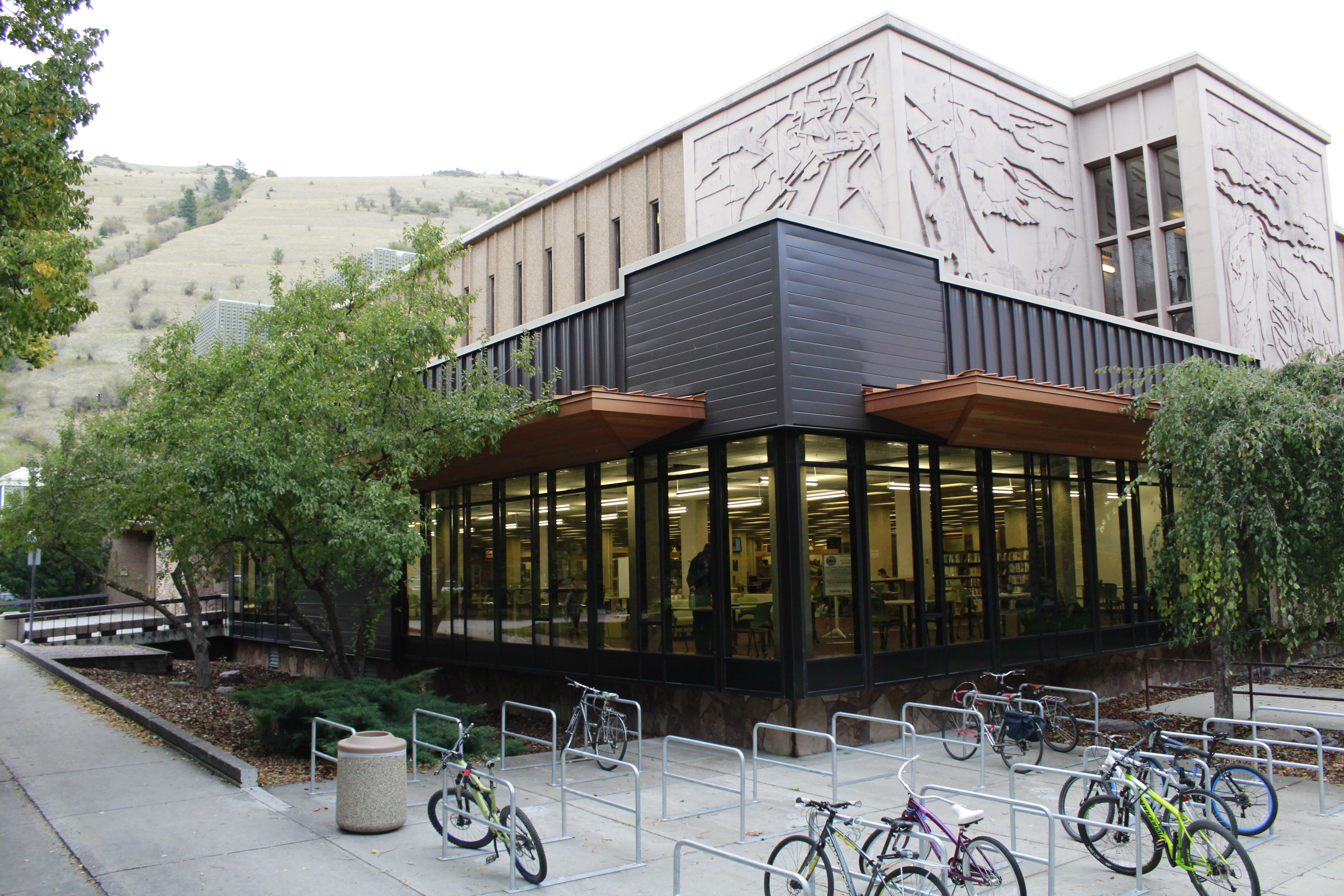
- Corner of the Mansfield Library, 2019
- Location: University of Montana; Missoula, Montana, United States
- Type: Academic library
- Established: 1895, 1978 (current)

Collection
- Size: 1.5 million volumes+
- Legal deposit: Federal Depository Library; Regional Depository Library for Montana

Other information
- Director: Barry Brown, Interim
- Website: www.lib.umt.edu

The Maureen and Mike Mansfield Library is the campus library at the University of Montana in Missoula, Montana. Completed in 1978 on the east side of campus, the five-story library was funded by the U.S. Department of Commerce.

In 1979, it was dedicated to Ambassador Mike Mansfield (1903–2001) and his wife Maureen. Previously a four-term U.S. Senator, alumnus Mansfield was the Senate's longest-serving majority leader (1961–1977). The library is home to the earliest authorized edition of the Lewis and Clark journals.

== History ==
The University of Montana library was established in 1895, two years after the establishment of the University of Montana. The library was temporarily housed in the old Willard School on Sixth Street in Missoula before a permanent structure was built on the UM campus. After one year at the old Willard School, library holdings totaled at 1,369 volumes, 19 periodicals, and 20 newspapers.

Today, the library features state-of-the-art electronic access to information. It is a Federal Government Depository Collection and has an extensive Maps Collection.

== Location ==
The University of Montana library has moved several times as the collection size expanded beyond the location's available capacity. Note:(The current names of the buildings are listed here.)

- 1895 - old Willard School
- 1899 - University Hall
- 1908 - Jeannette Rankin Hall
  - library designated as a depository for government documents
- 1921 - Social Science Building
- 1974 - Maureen and Mike Mansfield Library
  - construction was completed in 1978, on the southern portion of the first Dornblaser Field (1912–1967)

== About the Library ==
The Maureen and Mike Mansfield Library has the largest library collection of books and media in Montana and comprises the heart of The University of Montana's library system. Collections exceed 1.5 million volumes, 125,000 maps, 100,000 archival photographs, 77,000 electronic books, 50,000 media items, 12,000 theses, dissertations and graduate professional papers, and over 11,000 linear feet of archival manuscripts. It also houses more than 5,000 rare and valuable books. Combined collections within the Montana Public Access Catalog of the Affiliated Libraries of The University of Montana exceed 1.9 million volumes. Over the last 10 years, the Mansfield Library has greatly increased access to electronic journal literature and now has over 30,000 print and electronic journals and hundreds of electronic databases.

The library has roughly 100 computer workstations for students, staff and faculty, and has seven for the general public. Additionally, there are two video recording studios, including one combined audio recording station, two Alienware computer stations dedicated for video editing and 3D rendering, and an Occulus Rift virtual reality computer station.

The library houses one of the university's two printing shops, the Paw Print, which offers various printing services including large scale printing. The Paw Print also features three 3D printers and laser cutters.

The library takes up roughly five acres, and has five floors in total, with three above ground floors and two basement levels, all of which are open to the public.

The library is a member of the TRAILS consortium of Montana academic libraries. The Mansfield Library joined in 2015 upon formation of the consortium.

== Mansfield Center ==
The Maureen and Mike Mansfield Center of the Mansfield Library is dedicated to improving understanding of Asian and U.S. foreign relations, ethics and public affairs.

"The Center houses programs that embody the core interests and characteristics of Senator Mansfield's career, namely, Modern Asian Affairs and Ethics in Public Affairs. The Center has broadened its original focus on East and Northeast Asia to include South and Southeast Asia, an evolution that reflects growing American interests in these sub-regions of a dynamic continent with ever-growing links to the United States."

The Mansfield Center also works closely with The Maureen and Mike Mansfield Foundation (est. 1983) to "promote understanding and cooperation among the nations and peoples of Asia and the United States." The Foundation maintains offices in Washington, D.C.; Tokyo, Japan; Missoula, Montana; and a joint office in Beijing, China, with The Maureen and Mike Mansfield Center at The University of Montana.

== Affiliates ==
- College of Technology of The University of Montana
- Montana Tech of the University of Montana
- Helena College University of Montana
- The University of Montana Jameson Law Library
- University of Montana Western
