= 1964 United States Senate election in Montana =

- November 3, 1964
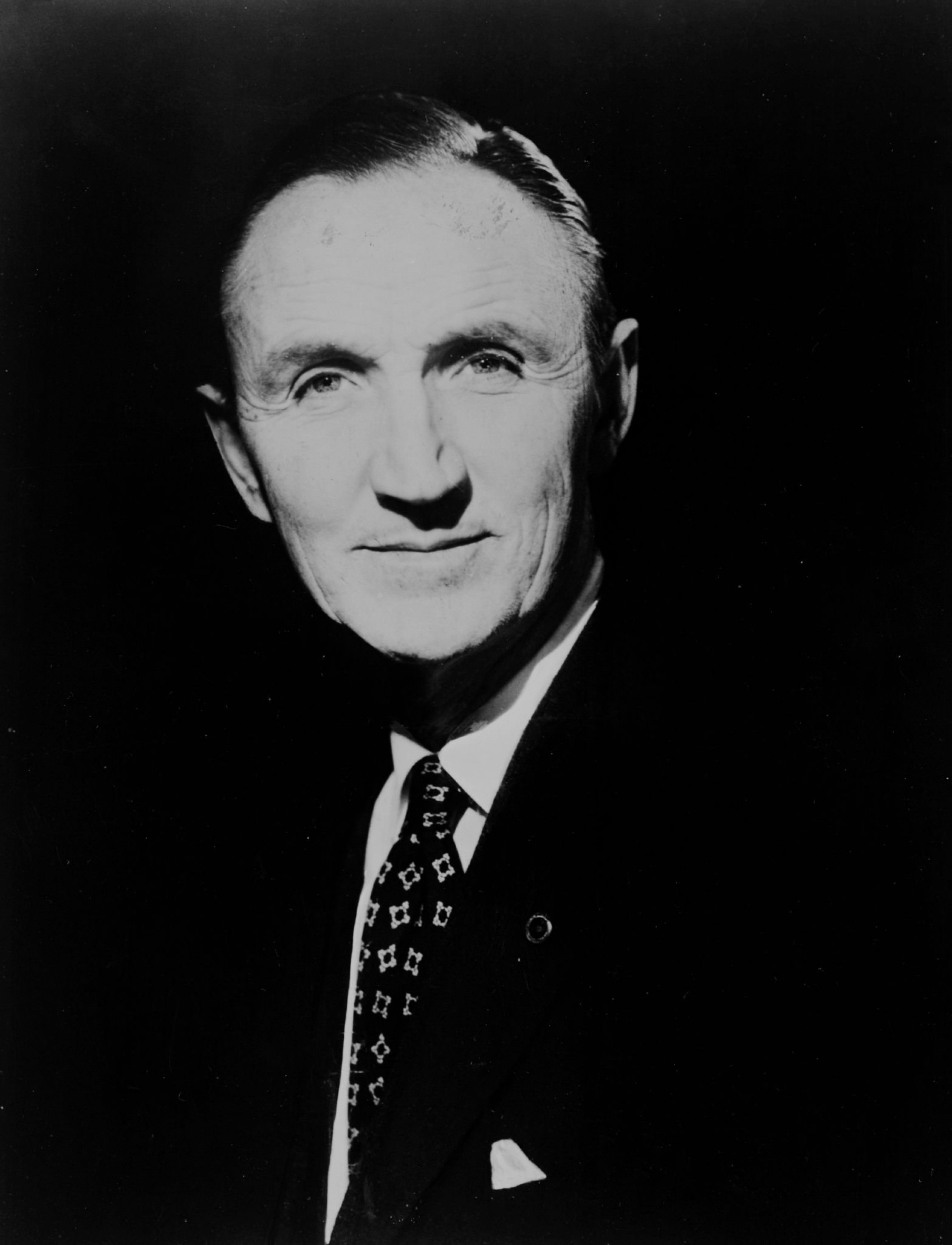

Nominee	Mike Mansfield	Alex Blewett
Party	Democratic	Republican
Popular vote	180,643	99,367
Percentage	64.51%	35.49%
- County results Mansfield: 50–60% 60–70% 70–80% Blewett: 50–60%
U.S. senator before election
Mike Mansfield
Democratic
Elected U.S. Senator
Mike Mansfield
Democratic

The 1964 United States Senate election in Montana took place on November 3, 1964. Incumbent United States Senator Mike Mansfield, who was first elected to the Senate in 1952 and was re-elected in 1958, ran for re-election. Mansfield won the Democratic primary in a landslide, and advanced to the general election, where he faced Alex Blewett, the Majority Leader of the Montana House of Representatives and the Republican nominee. Though Mansfield's margin was quite reduced from 1958, he still overwhelmingly defeated Blewett and won his third term in the Senate in a landslide.

== Democratic primary ==
=== Candidates ===
- Mike Mansfield, incumbent United States Senator
- Joseph P. Monaghan, former United States Congressman from Montana's 1st congressional district, 1936 independent candidate for the United States Senate

=== Results ===
Democratic Party primary results
Party	Candidate	Votes	%
Democratic	Mike Mansfield (inc.)	109,904	85.51
Democratic	Joseph P. Monaghan	18,630	14.49
Total votes		128,534	100.00

== Republican primary ==
=== Candidates ===
- Alex Blewett, Majority Leader of the Montana House of Representatives
- Lyman Brewster, rancher
- Antoinette F. Rosell, State Representative

=== Results ===
Republican Primary results
Party	Candidate	Votes	%
Republican	Alex Blewett	31,934	59.37
Republican	Lyman Brewster	12,375	23.01
Republican	Antoinette F. Rosell	9,480	17.62
Total votes		53,789	100.00

== General election ==
=== Results ===
United States Senate election in Montana, 1964
Party	Candidate	Votes	%	±%
Democratic	Mike Mansfield (inc.)	180,643	64.51%	−11.71%
Republican	Alex Blewett	99,367	35.49%	+11.71%
Majority		81,276	29.03%	−23.41%
Turnout		280,010		
Democratic hold		Swing		
