= List of United States senators from Montana =

Current delegation

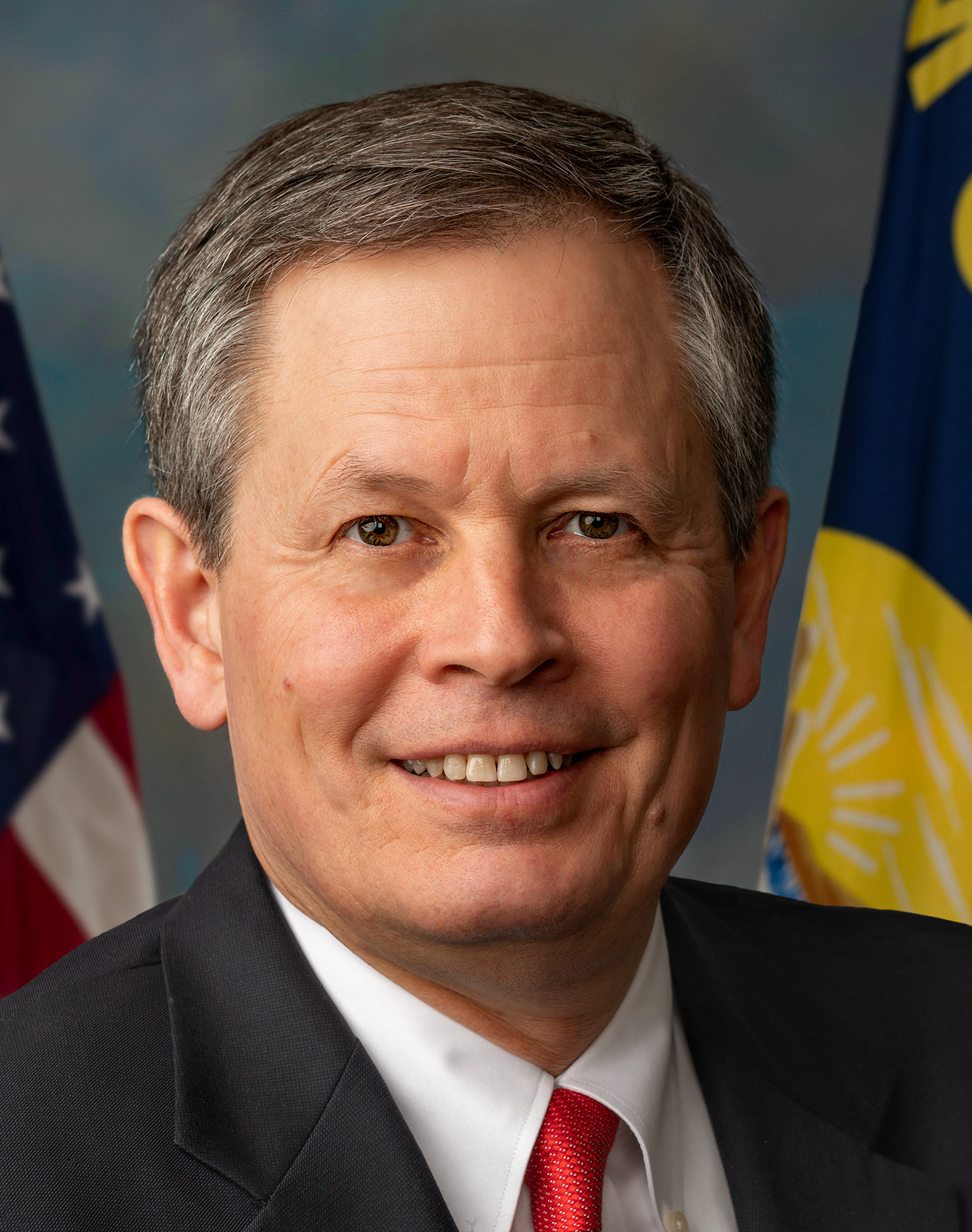
Steve Daines (R)

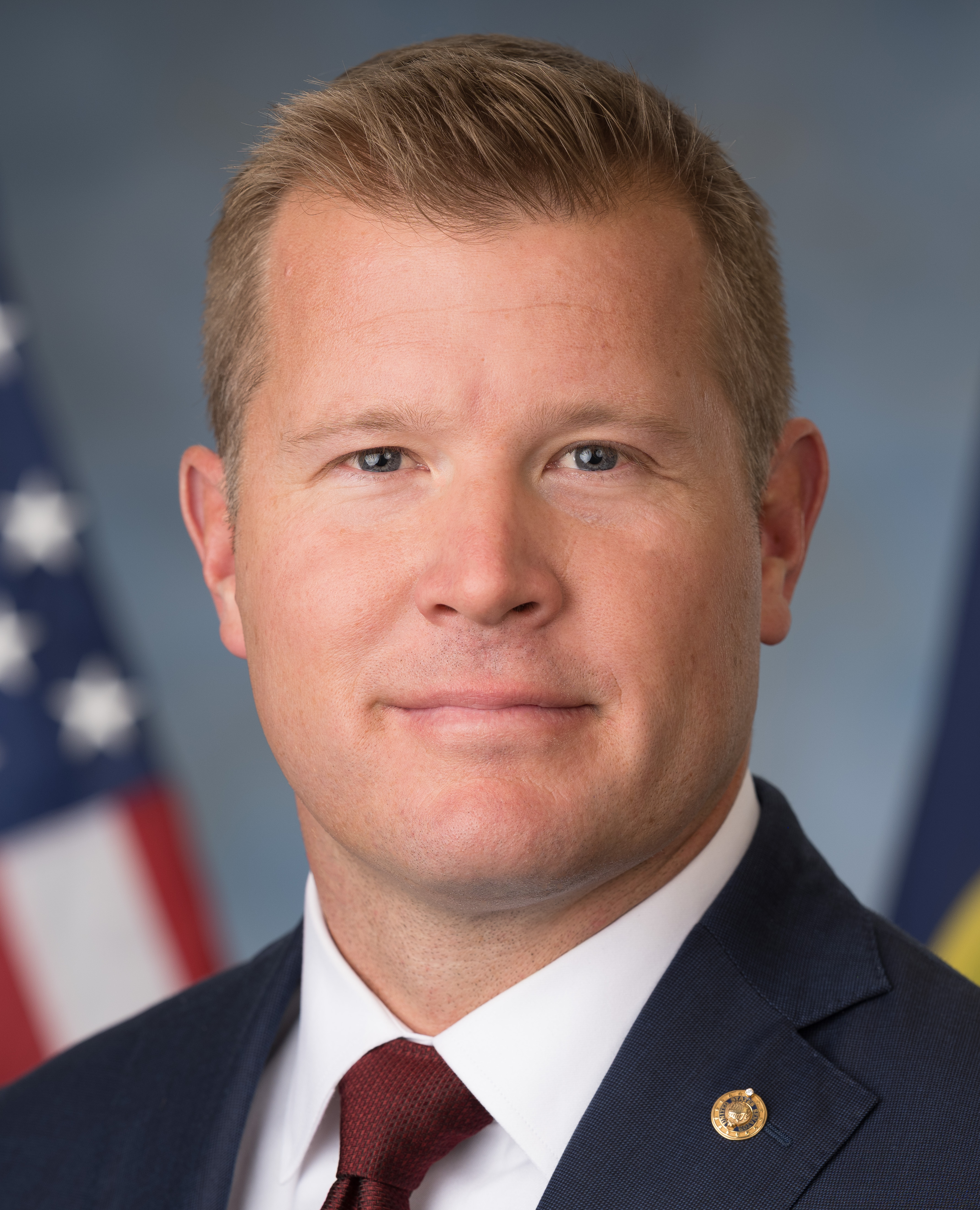
Tim Sheehy (R)

(ordered by seniority)

Montana was admitted to the Union on November 8, 1889, and elects U.S. senators to classes 1 and 2. Its current U.S. senators are Republicans Steve Daines (serving since 2015) and Tim Sheehy (serving since 2025). Democrat Max Baucus is the state's longest serving senator, serving from 1978 to 2014.

== List of senators ==
Class 1 Class 1 senators belong to the electoral cycle that most recently had regular elections in 2006, 2012, 2018, and 2024. The next election will be in 2030.						C	Class 2 Class 2 senators belong to the electoral cycle that most recently had regular elections in 2008, 2014, 2020, and 2026. The next election will be in 2032.					
#	Senator	Party	Dates in office	Electoral history	T	C	T	Electoral history	Dates in office	Party	Senator	#
Vacant			Nov 8, 1889 – Jan 1, 1890	Montana elected its first senators two months after admission to the Union.	1	51st	1	Montana elected its first senators two months after admission to the Union.	Nov 8, 1889 – Jan 2, 1890	Vacant		
1	Wilbur F. Sanders (Helena)	Republican	Jan 1, 1890 – Mar 3, 1893	Elected in 1890. Lost re-election.	1	51st	1	Elected in 1890. Retired.	Jan 2, 1890 – Mar 3, 1895	Republican	Thomas C. Power (Helena)	1
1	Wilbur F. Sanders (Helena)	Republican	Jan 1, 1890 – Mar 3, 1893	Elected in 1890. Lost re-election.	1	52nd	1	Elected in 1890. Retired.	Jan 2, 1890 – Mar 3, 1895	Republican	Thomas C. Power (Helena)	1
Vacant			Mar 3, 1893 – Jan 16, 1895	Legislature failed to elect.	2	53rd	1	Elected in 1890. Retired.	Jan 2, 1890 – Mar 3, 1895	Republican	Thomas C. Power (Helena)	1
2	Lee Mantle (Butte)	Republican	Jan 16, 1895 – Mar 3, 1899	Elected to finish vacant term. Lost renomination.	2	53rd	1	Elected in 1890. Retired.	Jan 2, 1890 – Mar 3, 1895	Republican	Thomas C. Power (Helena)	1
2	Lee Mantle (Butte)	Republican	Jan 16, 1895 – Mar 3, 1899	Elected to finish vacant term. Lost renomination.	2	54th	2	Elected in Jan 1895. Lost re-election.	Mar 4, 1895 – Mar 3, 1901	Republican	Thomas H. Carter (Helena)	2
2	Lee Mantle (Butte)	Silver; Republican	Jan 16, 1895 – Mar 3, 1899	Elected to finish vacant term. Lost renomination.	2	55th	2	Elected in Jan 1895. Lost re-election.	Mar 4, 1895 – Mar 3, 1901	Republican	Thomas H. Carter (Helena)	2
3	William Clark (Butte)	Democratic	Mar 4, 1899 – May 15, 1900	Elected in 1899. Resigned to avoid claim of election fraud.	3	56th	2	Elected in Jan 1895. Lost re-election.	Mar 4, 1895 – Mar 3, 1901	Republican	Thomas H. Carter (Helena)	2
Vacant			May 15, 1900 – Mar 7, 1901	Clark was appointed to continue his term, but did not qualify.	3	56th	2	Elected in Jan 1895. Lost re-election.	Mar 4, 1895 – Mar 3, 1901	Republican	Thomas H. Carter (Helena)	2
Vacant			May 15, 1900 – Mar 7, 1901	Clark was appointed to continue his term, but did not qualify.	3	57th	3	Elected in 1901. Retired.	Mar 4, 1901 – Mar 3, 1907	Democratic	William Clark (Butte)	3
4	Paris Gibson (Great Falls)	Democratic	Mar 7, 1901 – Mar 3, 1905	Elected to finish Clark's term. Retired.	3	57th	3	Elected in 1901. Retired.	Mar 4, 1901 – Mar 3, 1907	Democratic	William Clark (Butte)	3
4	Paris Gibson (Great Falls)	Democratic	Mar 7, 1901 – Mar 3, 1905	Elected to finish Clark's term. Retired.	3	58th	3	Elected in 1901. Retired.	Mar 4, 1901 – Mar 3, 1907	Democratic	William Clark (Butte)	3
5	Thomas H. Carter (Helena)	Republican	Mar 4, 1905 – Mar 3, 1911	Elected Jan 16, 1905. Lost re-election.	4	59th	3	Elected in 1901. Retired.	Mar 4, 1901 – Mar 3, 1907	Democratic	William Clark (Butte)	3
5	Thomas H. Carter (Helena)	Republican	Mar 4, 1905 – Mar 3, 1911	Elected Jan 16, 1905. Lost re-election.	4	60th	4	Elected Jan 16, 1907. Lost re-election as a Progressive.	Mar 4, 1907 – Mar 3, 1913	Republican	Joseph M. Dixon (Missoula)	4
5	Thomas H. Carter (Helena)	Republican	Mar 4, 1905 – Mar 3, 1911	Elected Jan 16, 1905. Lost re-election.	4	61st	4	Elected Jan 16, 1907. Lost re-election as a Progressive.	Mar 4, 1907 – Mar 3, 1913	Republican	Joseph M. Dixon (Missoula)	4
6	Henry L. Myers (Hamilton)	Democratic	Mar 4, 1911 – Mar 3, 1923	Elected Mar 2, 1911.	5	62nd	4	Elected Jan 16, 1907. Lost re-election as a Progressive.	Mar 4, 1907 – Mar 3, 1913	Republican	Joseph M. Dixon (Missoula)	4
6	Henry L. Myers (Hamilton)	Democratic	Mar 4, 1911 – Mar 3, 1923	Elected Mar 2, 1911.	5	63rd	5	Elected Jan 14, 1913.	Mar 4, 1913 – Mar 2, 1933	Democratic	Thomas J. Walsh (Helena)	5
6	Henry L. Myers (Hamilton)	Democratic	Mar 4, 1911 – Mar 3, 1923	Elected Mar 2, 1911.	5	64th	5	Elected Jan 14, 1913.	Mar 4, 1913 – Mar 2, 1933	Democratic	Thomas J. Walsh (Helena)	5
6	Henry L. Myers (Hamilton)	Democratic	Mar 4, 1911 – Mar 3, 1923	Re-elected in 1916. Retired.	6	65th	5	Elected Jan 14, 1913.	Mar 4, 1913 – Mar 2, 1933	Democratic	Thomas J. Walsh (Helena)	5
6	Henry L. Myers (Hamilton)	Democratic	Mar 4, 1911 – Mar 3, 1923	Re-elected in 1916. Retired.	6	66th	6	Re-elected in 1918.	Mar 4, 1913 – Mar 2, 1933	Democratic	Thomas J. Walsh (Helena)	5
6	Henry L. Myers (Hamilton)	Democratic	Mar 4, 1911 – Mar 3, 1923	Re-elected in 1916. Retired.	6	67th	6	Re-elected in 1918.	Mar 4, 1913 – Mar 2, 1933	Democratic	Thomas J. Walsh (Helena)	5
7	Burton K. Wheeler (Butte)	Democratic	Mar 4, 1923 – Jan 3, 1947	Elected in 1922.	7	68th	6	Re-elected in 1918.	Mar 4, 1913 – Mar 2, 1933	Democratic	Thomas J. Walsh (Helena)	5
7	Burton K. Wheeler (Butte)	Democratic	Mar 4, 1923 – Jan 3, 1947	Elected in 1922.	7	69th	7	Re-elected in 1924.	Mar 4, 1913 – Mar 2, 1933	Democratic	Thomas J. Walsh (Helena)	5
7	Burton K. Wheeler (Butte)	Democratic	Mar 4, 1923 – Jan 3, 1947	Elected in 1922.	7	70th	7	Re-elected in 1924.	Mar 4, 1913 – Mar 2, 1933	Democratic	Thomas J. Walsh (Helena)	5
7	Burton K. Wheeler (Butte)	Democratic	Mar 4, 1923 – Jan 3, 1947	Re-elected in 1928.	8	71st	7	Re-elected in 1924.	Mar 4, 1913 – Mar 2, 1933	Democratic	Thomas J. Walsh (Helena)	5
7	Burton K. Wheeler (Butte)	Democratic	Mar 4, 1923 – Jan 3, 1947	Re-elected in 1928.	8	72nd	8	Re-elected in 1930. Died.	Mar 4, 1913 – Mar 2, 1933	Democratic	Thomas J. Walsh (Helena)	5
7	Burton K. Wheeler (Butte)	Democratic	Mar 4, 1923 – Jan 3, 1947	Re-elected in 1928.	8	72nd	8		Mar 2, 1933 – Mar 13, 1933	Vacant		
7	Burton K. Wheeler (Butte)	Democratic	Mar 4, 1923 – Jan 3, 1947	Re-elected in 1928.	8	73rd	8		Mar 2, 1933 – Mar 13, 1933	Vacant		
7	Burton K. Wheeler (Butte)	Democratic	Mar 4, 1923 – Jan 3, 1947	Re-elected in 1928.	8	73rd	8	Appointed to continue Walsh's term. Lost nomination to finish Walsh's term.	Mar 13, 1933 – Nov 6, 1934	Democratic	John E. Erickson (Kalispell)	6
7	Burton K. Wheeler (Butte)	Democratic	Mar 4, 1923 – Jan 3, 1947	Re-elected in 1928.	8	73rd	8	Elected to finish Walsh's term.	Nov 7, 1934 – Jan 3, 1961	Democratic	James E. Murray (Butte)	7
7	Burton K. Wheeler (Butte)	Democratic	Mar 4, 1923 – Jan 3, 1947	Re-elected in 1934.	9	74th	8	Elected to finish Walsh's term.	Nov 7, 1934 – Jan 3, 1961	Democratic	James E. Murray (Butte)	7
7	Burton K. Wheeler (Butte)	Democratic	Mar 4, 1923 – Jan 3, 1947	Re-elected in 1934.	9	75th	9	Re-elected in 1936.	Nov 7, 1934 – Jan 3, 1961	Democratic	James E. Murray (Butte)	7
7	Burton K. Wheeler (Butte)	Democratic	Mar 4, 1923 – Jan 3, 1947	Re-elected in 1934.	9	76th	9	Re-elected in 1936.	Nov 7, 1934 – Jan 3, 1961	Democratic	James E. Murray (Butte)	7
7	Burton K. Wheeler (Butte)	Democratic	Mar 4, 1923 – Jan 3, 1947	Re-elected in 1940. Lost renomination.	10	77th	9	Re-elected in 1936.	Nov 7, 1934 – Jan 3, 1961	Democratic	James E. Murray (Butte)	7
7	Burton K. Wheeler (Butte)	Democratic	Mar 4, 1923 – Jan 3, 1947	Re-elected in 1940. Lost renomination.	10	78th	10	Re-elected in 1942.	Nov 7, 1934 – Jan 3, 1961	Democratic	James E. Murray (Butte)	7
7	Burton K. Wheeler (Butte)	Democratic	Mar 4, 1923 – Jan 3, 1947	Re-elected in 1940. Lost renomination.	10	79th	10	Re-elected in 1942.	Nov 7, 1934 – Jan 3, 1961	Democratic	James E. Murray (Butte)	7
8	Zales Ecton (Manhattan)	Republican	Jan 3, 1947 – Jan 3, 1953	Elected in 1946. Lost re-election.	11	80th	10	Re-elected in 1942.	Nov 7, 1934 – Jan 3, 1961	Democratic	James E. Murray (Butte)	7
8	Zales Ecton (Manhattan)	Republican	Jan 3, 1947 – Jan 3, 1953	Elected in 1946. Lost re-election.	11	81st	11	Re-elected in 1948.	Nov 7, 1934 – Jan 3, 1961	Democratic	James E. Murray (Butte)	7
8	Zales Ecton (Manhattan)	Republican	Jan 3, 1947 – Jan 3, 1953	Elected in 1946. Lost re-election.	11	82nd	11	Re-elected in 1948.	Nov 7, 1934 – Jan 3, 1961	Democratic	James E. Murray (Butte)	7
9	Mike Mansfield (Missoula)	Democratic	Jan 3, 1953 – Jan 3, 1977	Elected in 1952.	12	83rd	11	Re-elected in 1948.	Nov 7, 1934 – Jan 3, 1961	Democratic	James E. Murray (Butte)	7
9	Mike Mansfield (Missoula)	Democratic	Jan 3, 1953 – Jan 3, 1977	Elected in 1952.	12	84th	12	Re-elected in 1954. Retired.	Nov 7, 1934 – Jan 3, 1961	Democratic	James E. Murray (Butte)	7
9	Mike Mansfield (Missoula)	Democratic	Jan 3, 1953 – Jan 3, 1977	Elected in 1952.	12	85th	12	Re-elected in 1954. Retired.	Nov 7, 1934 – Jan 3, 1961	Democratic	James E. Murray (Butte)	7
9	Mike Mansfield (Missoula)	Democratic	Jan 3, 1953 – Jan 3, 1977	Re-elected in 1958.	13	86th	12	Re-elected in 1954. Retired.	Nov 7, 1934 – Jan 3, 1961	Democratic	James E. Murray (Butte)	7
9	Mike Mansfield (Missoula)	Democratic	Jan 3, 1953 – Jan 3, 1977	Re-elected in 1958.	13	87th	13	Elected in 1960.	Jan 3, 1961 – Jan 12, 1978	Democratic	Lee Metcalf (Helena)	8
9	Mike Mansfield (Missoula)	Democratic	Jan 3, 1953 – Jan 3, 1977	Re-elected in 1958.	13	88th	13	Elected in 1960.	Jan 3, 1961 – Jan 12, 1978	Democratic	Lee Metcalf (Helena)	8
9	Mike Mansfield (Missoula)	Democratic	Jan 3, 1953 – Jan 3, 1977	Re-elected in 1964.	14	89th	13	Elected in 1960.	Jan 3, 1961 – Jan 12, 1978	Democratic	Lee Metcalf (Helena)	8
9	Mike Mansfield (Missoula)	Democratic	Jan 3, 1953 – Jan 3, 1977	Re-elected in 1964.	14	90th	14	Re-elected in 1966.	Jan 3, 1961 – Jan 12, 1978	Democratic	Lee Metcalf (Helena)	8
9	Mike Mansfield (Missoula)	Democratic	Jan 3, 1953 – Jan 3, 1977	Re-elected in 1964.	14	91st	14	Re-elected in 1966.	Jan 3, 1961 – Jan 12, 1978	Democratic	Lee Metcalf (Helena)	8
9	Mike Mansfield (Missoula)	Democratic	Jan 3, 1953 – Jan 3, 1977	Re-elected in 1970. Retired.	15	92nd	14	Re-elected in 1966.	Jan 3, 1961 – Jan 12, 1978	Democratic	Lee Metcalf (Helena)	8
9	Mike Mansfield (Missoula)	Democratic	Jan 3, 1953 – Jan 3, 1977	Re-elected in 1970. Retired.	15	93rd	15	Re-elected in 1972. Died.	Jan 3, 1961 – Jan 12, 1978	Democratic	Lee Metcalf (Helena)	8
9	Mike Mansfield (Missoula)	Democratic	Jan 3, 1953 – Jan 3, 1977	Re-elected in 1970. Retired.	15	94th	15	Re-elected in 1972. Died.	Jan 3, 1961 – Jan 12, 1978	Democratic	Lee Metcalf (Helena)	8
10	John Melcher (Forsyth)	Democratic	Jan 3, 1977 – Jan 3, 1989	Elected in 1976.	16	95th	15	Re-elected in 1972. Died.	Jan 3, 1961 – Jan 12, 1978	Democratic	Lee Metcalf (Helena)	8
10	John Melcher (Forsyth)	Democratic	Jan 3, 1977 – Jan 3, 1989	Elected in 1976.	16	95th	15		Jan 12, 1978 – Jan 22, 1978	Vacant		
10	John Melcher (Forsyth)	Democratic	Jan 3, 1977 – Jan 3, 1989	Elected in 1976.	16	95th	15	Appointed to finish Metcalf's term. Lost nomination to full term. Resigned early to give successor preferential seniority.	Jan 22, 1978 – Dec 14, 1978	Democratic	Paul G. Hatfield (Great Falls)	9
10	John Melcher (Forsyth)	Democratic	Jan 3, 1977 – Jan 3, 1989	Elected in 1976.	16	95th	15		Dec 14, 1978 – Dec 15, 1978	Vacant		
10	John Melcher (Forsyth)	Democratic	Jan 3, 1977 – Jan 3, 1989	Elected in 1976.	16	95th	15	Appointed early to finish Metcalf's term, having already been elected to the next term.	Dec 15, 1978 – Feb 6, 2014	Democratic	Max Baucus (Helena)	10
10	John Melcher (Forsyth)	Democratic	Jan 3, 1977 – Jan 3, 1989	Elected in 1976.	16	96th	16	Elected in 1978.	Dec 15, 1978 – Feb 6, 2014	Democratic	Max Baucus (Helena)	10
10	John Melcher (Forsyth)	Democratic	Jan 3, 1977 – Jan 3, 1989	Elected in 1976.	16	97th	16	Elected in 1978.	Dec 15, 1978 – Feb 6, 2014	Democratic	Max Baucus (Helena)	10
10	John Melcher (Forsyth)	Democratic	Jan 3, 1977 – Jan 3, 1989	Re-elected in 1982. Lost re-election.	17	98th	16	Elected in 1978.	Dec 15, 1978 – Feb 6, 2014	Democratic	Max Baucus (Helena)	10
10	John Melcher (Forsyth)	Democratic	Jan 3, 1977 – Jan 3, 1989	Re-elected in 1982. Lost re-election.	17	99th	17	Re-elected in 1984.	Dec 15, 1978 – Feb 6, 2014	Democratic	Max Baucus (Helena)	10
10	John Melcher (Forsyth)	Democratic	Jan 3, 1977 – Jan 3, 1989	Re-elected in 1982. Lost re-election.	17	100th	17	Re-elected in 1984.	Dec 15, 1978 – Feb 6, 2014	Democratic	Max Baucus (Helena)	10
11	Conrad Burns (Billings)	Republican	Jan 3, 1989 – Jan 3, 2007	Elected in 1988.	18	101st	17	Re-elected in 1984.	Dec 15, 1978 – Feb 6, 2014	Democratic	Max Baucus (Helena)	10
11	Conrad Burns (Billings)	Republican	Jan 3, 1989 – Jan 3, 2007	Elected in 1988.	18	102nd	18	Re-elected in 1990.	Dec 15, 1978 – Feb 6, 2014	Democratic	Max Baucus (Helena)	10
11	Conrad Burns (Billings)	Republican	Jan 3, 1989 – Jan 3, 2007	Elected in 1988.	18	103rd	18	Re-elected in 1990.	Dec 15, 1978 – Feb 6, 2014	Democratic	Max Baucus (Helena)	10
11	Conrad Burns (Billings)	Republican	Jan 3, 1989 – Jan 3, 2007	Re-elected in 1994.	19	104th	18	Re-elected in 1990.	Dec 15, 1978 – Feb 6, 2014	Democratic	Max Baucus (Helena)	10
11	Conrad Burns (Billings)	Republican	Jan 3, 1989 – Jan 3, 2007	Re-elected in 1994.	19	105th	19	Re-elected in 1996.	Dec 15, 1978 – Feb 6, 2014	Democratic	Max Baucus (Helena)	10
11	Conrad Burns (Billings)	Republican	Jan 3, 1989 – Jan 3, 2007	Re-elected in 1994.	19	106th	19	Re-elected in 1996.	Dec 15, 1978 – Feb 6, 2014	Democratic	Max Baucus (Helena)	10
11	Conrad Burns (Billings)	Republican	Jan 3, 1989 – Jan 3, 2007	Re-elected in 2000. Lost re-election.	20	107th	19	Re-elected in 1996.	Dec 15, 1978 – Feb 6, 2014	Democratic	Max Baucus (Helena)	10
11	Conrad Burns (Billings)	Republican	Jan 3, 1989 – Jan 3, 2007	Re-elected in 2000. Lost re-election.	20	108th	20	Re-elected in 2002.	Dec 15, 1978 – Feb 6, 2014	Democratic	Max Baucus (Helena)	10
11	Conrad Burns (Billings)	Republican	Jan 3, 1989 – Jan 3, 2007	Re-elected in 2000. Lost re-election.	20	109th	20	Re-elected in 2002.	Dec 15, 1978 – Feb 6, 2014	Democratic	Max Baucus (Helena)	10
12	Jon Tester (Big Sandy)	Democratic	Jan 3, 2007 – Jan 3, 2025	Elected in 2006.	21	110th	20	Re-elected in 2002.	Dec 15, 1978 – Feb 6, 2014	Democratic	Max Baucus (Helena)	10
12	Jon Tester (Big Sandy)	Democratic	Jan 3, 2007 – Jan 3, 2025	Elected in 2006.	21	111th	21	Re-elected in 2008. Announced retirement, then resigned to become U.S. Ambassador to China.	Dec 15, 1978 – Feb 6, 2014	Democratic	Max Baucus (Helena)	10
12	Jon Tester (Big Sandy)	Democratic	Jan 3, 2007 – Jan 3, 2025	Elected in 2006.	21	112th	21	Re-elected in 2008. Announced retirement, then resigned to become U.S. Ambassador to China.	Dec 15, 1978 – Feb 6, 2014	Democratic	Max Baucus (Helena)	10
12	Jon Tester (Big Sandy)	Democratic	Jan 3, 2007 – Jan 3, 2025	Re-elected in 2012.	22	113th	21	Re-elected in 2008. Announced retirement, then resigned to become U.S. Ambassador to China.	Dec 15, 1978 – Feb 6, 2014	Democratic	Max Baucus (Helena)	10
12	Jon Tester (Big Sandy)	Democratic	Jan 3, 2007 – Jan 3, 2025	Re-elected in 2012.	22	113th	21		Feb 6, 2014 – Feb 9, 2014	Vacant		
12	Jon Tester (Big Sandy)	Democratic	Jan 3, 2007 – Jan 3, 2025	Re-elected in 2012.	22	113th	21	Appointed to finish Baucus's term. Ran for election to full term, but withdrew.	Feb 9, 2014 – Jan 3, 2015	Democratic	John Walsh (Helena)	11
12	Jon Tester (Big Sandy)	Democratic	Jan 3, 2007 – Jan 3, 2025	Re-elected in 2012.	22	114th	22	Elected in 2014.	Jan 3, 2015 – present	Republican	Steve Daines (Belgrade)	12
12	Jon Tester (Big Sandy)	Democratic	Jan 3, 2007 – Jan 3, 2025	Re-elected in 2012.	22	115th	22	Elected in 2014.	Jan 3, 2015 – present	Republican	Steve Daines (Belgrade)	12
12	Jon Tester (Big Sandy)	Democratic	Jan 3, 2007 – Jan 3, 2025	Re-elected in 2018. Lost re-election.	23	116th	22	Elected in 2014.	Jan 3, 2015 – present	Republican	Steve Daines (Belgrade)	12
12	Jon Tester (Big Sandy)	Democratic	Jan 3, 2007 – Jan 3, 2025	Re-elected in 2018. Lost re-election.	23	117th	23	Re-elected in 2020. Retiring at the end of term.	Jan 3, 2015 – present	Republican	Steve Daines (Belgrade)	12
12	Jon Tester (Big Sandy)	Democratic	Jan 3, 2007 – Jan 3, 2025	Re-elected in 2018. Lost re-election.	23	118th	23	Re-elected in 2020. Retiring at the end of term.	Jan 3, 2015 – present	Republican	Steve Daines (Belgrade)	12
13	Tim Sheehy (Bozeman)	Republican	Jan 3, 2025 – present	Elected in 2024.	24	119th	23	Re-elected in 2020. Retiring at the end of term.	Jan 3, 2015 – present	Republican	Steve Daines (Belgrade)	12
13	Tim Sheehy (Bozeman)	Republican	Jan 3, 2025 – present	Elected in 2024.	24	120th	24	Elected in 2026.	Taking office Jan 3, 2027	Republican	Kurt Alme (elect) (Billings)	13
13	Tim Sheehy (Bozeman)	Republican	Jan 3, 2025 – present	Elected in 2024.	24	121st	24	Elected in 2026.	Taking office Jan 3, 2027	Republican	Kurt Alme (elect) (Billings)	13
To be determined in the 2030 election.					25	122nd	24	Elected in 2026.	Taking office Jan 3, 2027	Republican	Kurt Alme (elect) (Billings)	13
To be determined in the 2030 election.					25	123rd	25	To be determined in the 2032 election.				

== See also ==
- Elections in Montana
- List of United States representatives from Montana
- Montana's congressional delegations
