= Maureen and Mike Mansfield Foundation =

American-based foundation

Mansfield Foundation logo

The Maureen and Mike Mansfield Foundation was established in 1983 to "promote understanding and cooperation among the nations and peoples of Asia and the United States." The Foundation honors Mike Mansfield (1903–2001), congressman from Montana, Senate majority leader and U.S. ambassador to Japan. The Foundation is a registered nonprofit 501(c)(3) organization and works with the Maureen and Mike Mansfield Center at The University of Montana.

The Foundation's exchange programs include the Mansfield Fellowship Program, Japan Legislative Exchange, Women in Politics and Public Service, and the Mansfield Congressional Study Tour on Asia. In addition, the Foundation sponsors policy dialogues on such topics as entrepreneurship in Asia, the Rule of Law, the emergence of India and China, global climate change, and the role of NGOs in North Korea.

The Foundation maintains offices in Washington, D.C., Tokyo, Japan, and Missoula, Montana. The Foundation is not a grant-making organization and does not accept grant proposals.

== Programs ==
The Foundation advances understanding and cooperation in U.S.-Asia relations through exchanges, policy dialogues, research and education.

=== Mansfield Fellowships ===
The Foundation's flagship program is the Mike Mansfield Fellowship, a first-of-its-kind exchange program that allows a select group of U.S. government officials the opportunity to build Japan expertise and networks that lead to collaboration and cooperation in U.S.-Japan relations.

The fellowship was established by the U.S. Congress in 1994 to build a corps of U.S. civil servants with in-depth Japan expertise. During the year-long fellowship, participants gain proficiency in Japanese and learn how issues and policies are handled in Japan through postings in their counterpart agencies and ministries.

The fellowship is only open to U.S. federal employees and consists of seven weeks of full-time Japanese language training in Kanazawa, Ishikawa Prefecture, Japan, followed by ten months of placements in Japanese government agencies and private sector organizations or corporations.

=== Exchanges ===
The Foundation organizes exchanges for U.S. and Asian policy makers and opinion leaders, allowing them to focus on such issues as security, economics and trade. Examples of these include bringing Japanese Diet members to the United States for week-long visits, discussions and meetings with U.S. elected officials and opinion leaders, as well as organizing exchanges for U.S. and Japanese women in politics and public service to explore the role of women leaders in addressing social policy issues.

=== Policy dialogues ===
The Foundation's policy dialogues give small groups of emerging leaders from Northeast Asia and the United States the opportunity to examine some of the most complex issues in the Asia-Pacific region. The Foundation has held a series of Trilateral Retreats for young leaders from Japan, China and Korea as well as workshops and conferences on entrepreneurship in Asia, the Rule of Law in Asia, the emergence of India and china, global climate change, the role of NGOs in North Korea, and rural healthcare in Japan.

=== Corporate affiliates program ===
A member-based initiative, this program promotes private/public sector dialogue on issues affecting U.S. and multinational corporations operating in Asia, with a special emphasis on keeping Congress on top of Asia issues. Activities include briefings and roundtable discussions on issues such as trade, economics, intellectual property rights and rule of law.

=== Exchanges with the All-China Youth Federation ===
The Foundation is increasing its ties to China as well. In working with the All-China Youth Federation, the foundation brings Chinese provincial leaders to the United States to learn about U.S. policymaking at the national and local levels.

=== Asian opinion poll database ===
The foundation translates and makes available at no cost a web-based database of opinion polls from newspapers and magazines in Japan and Korea. Polls are included from the Nikkei Shimbun (Japan); the Asahi Shimbun (Japan); Yomiuri Shimbun (Japan); East Asia Institute (South Korea); the Dong-A Ilbo (South Korea); and the Monthly Joong-Ang Magazine (South Korea).

=== Mansfield Center at the University of Montana ===
The Foundation also helps fund the Asia programs of the Maureen and Mike Mansfield Center at The University of Montana, which include teaching, research, publications and conferences.

== See also ==
- Mike Mansfield
- Maureen and Mike Mansfield Library
