= Mike Mansfield =

American politician and diplomat (1903–2001)

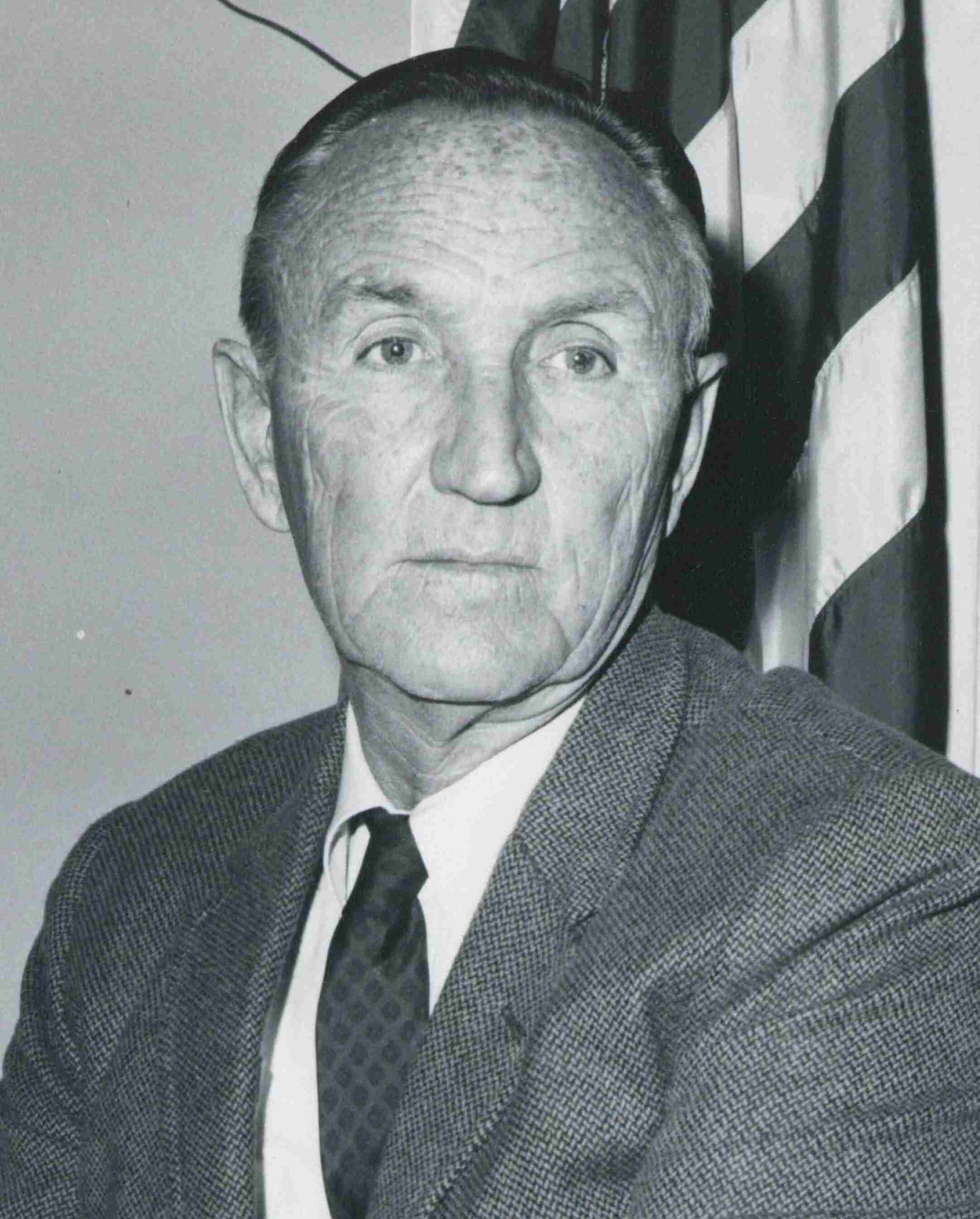

22nd United States Ambassador to Japan
- In office June 10, 1977 – December 22, 1988
- President: Jimmy Carter; Ronald Reagan
- Preceded by: James Day Hodgson
- Succeeded by: Michael Armacost

Senate Majority Leader
- In office January 3, 1961 – January 3, 1977
- Whip: Hubert Humphrey; Russell B. Long; Ted Kennedy; Robert Byrd
- Preceded by: Lyndon B. Johnson
- Succeeded by: Robert Byrd

United States Senator from Montana
- In office January 3, 1953 – January 3, 1977
- Preceded by: Zales Ecton
- Succeeded by: John Melcher
Senate positions
Chair of the Senate Democratic Caucus
In office January 3, 1961 – January 3, 1977
Preceded by	Lyndon Johnson
Succeeded by	Robert Byrd
Senate Majority Whip
In office January 3, 1957 – January 3, 1961
Leader	Lyndon Johnson
Preceded by	Earle Clements
Succeeded by	Hubert Humphrey
Chair of the Senate Rules Committee
In office September 14, 1960 – February 25, 1963
Preceded by	Thomas Hennings
Succeeded by	Everett Jordan

Member of the U.S. House of Representatives from Montana's 1st district
- In office January 3, 1943 – January 3, 1953
- Preceded by: Jeannette Rankin
- Succeeded by: Lee Metcalf

Personal details
- Born: Michael Joseph Mansfield; March 16, 1903 New York City, New York, U.S.
- Died: October 5, 2001 (aged 98) Washington, D.C., U.S.
- Resting place: Arlington National Cemetery
- Party: Democratic
- Spouse: Maureen Hayes (m. 1932; died 2000)
- Children: 1
- Education: University of Montana (BA, MA); University of California, Los Angeles

Military service
- Allegiance: United States
- Branch/service: United States Navy; United States Army; United States Marine Corps
- Years of service: 1918–1919 (Navy); 1919–1920 (Army); 1920–1922 (Marine Corps)
- Rank: Seaman (Navy); Private (Army); Private First Class (Marine Corps)
- Battles/wars: World War I

Michael Joseph Mansfield (March 16, 1903 – October 5, 2001) was an American Democratic Party politician and diplomat who represented Montana in the United States House of Representatives from 1943 to 1953 and United States Senate from 1953 to 1977. As the leader of the Senate Democratic Caucus from 1961 to 1977, Mansfield shepherded Great Society programs through the Senate; his tenure of exactly sixteen years was the longest of any party leader in Senate history, until the record was broken by Mitch McConnell in 2023.

Born in Brooklyn, New York, Mansfield grew up in Great Falls, Montana. He lied about his age to serve in the United States Navy during World War I. After the war, he became a professor of history and political science at the University of Montana. He won election to the House of Representatives and served on the House Committee on Foreign Affairs during World War II.

In 1952, he defeated incumbent Republican Senator Zales Ecton to take a seat in the Senate. Mansfield served as Senate Majority Whip from 1957 to 1961. Mansfield ascended to Senate Majority Leader after Lyndon B. Johnson resigned from the Senate to become vice president. In the later years of the Vietnam War, he opposed escalation of American involvement and supported President Richard Nixon's plans for Vietnamization.

After retiring from the Senate, Mansfield served as United States Ambassador to Japan from 1977 to 1988. Mansfield is the longest-serving American ambassador to Japan in history. Upon his retirement, he was awarded the nation's highest civilian honor, the Presidential Medal of Freedom. Mansfield also worked as a senior adviser on East Asian affairs to Goldman Sachs.

== Early childhood ==
Michael Joseph (Mike) Mansfield was born on March 16, 1903, in Brooklyn, New York, to Irish immigrant parents, Patrick J. Mansfield and Josephine (née O'Brien) Mansfield. His father worked various jobs, including as a construction worker, hotel porter, and maintenance man, to support the family. In 1910, Josephine died from nephritis. Shortly before her death, Patrick had been injured in a construction accident, which left him unable to care for his three children. As a result, Patrick sent Mike and his two sisters to live with his great-aunt and uncle, Richard and Margaret, in Great Falls, Montana. In Montana, he attended local public schools, and worked in his relatives' grocery store. He turned into a habitual runaway, even living at a state orphanage in Twin Bridges for half a year.

In 1917, at age 14, Mansfield dropped out of school, left home and made his way to a logging camp in Leavenworth, Washington. There, he met members of the Oregon National Guard, who were stationed nearby. They helped him board their troop train as it traveled east to New York, en route to their eventual deployment in Europe. He made it to New York City, where he reunited with his father.

== Military service ==
Wanting to join the war effort during World War I, the 14 year old Mansfield forged his father's signature in order to enlist in the US Navy. He went on several overseas convoys on the USS Minneapolis, but was discharged by the Navy after his real age was discovered. (He was the last known veteran of the war to die before he reached the age of 100 and the last World War I veteran to sit in the US Senate.) After his Navy discharge, he enlisted in the US Army, serving as a private from 1919 to 1920.

Mansfield was a Private First Class in the US Marine Corps from 1920 to 1922. He served in the Western Recruiting Division at San Francisco until January 1921, when he was transferred to the Marine Barracks at Puget Sound, Washington. The following month, he was detached to the Guard Company, Marine Barracks, Navy Yard, Mare Island, California. In April, he boarded the USAT Sherman, bound for the Philippines. After a brief stopover at the Marine Barracks at Cavite, he arrived at his duty station on May 5, 1921, the Marine Barracks, Naval Station, Olongapo, Philippine Islands. One year later, Mansfield was assigned to Company A, Marine Battery, Asiatic Fleet. A short tour of duty with the Asiatic Fleet took him along the coast of China before he returned to Olongapo in late May 1922. His service with the Marines established a lifelong interest in Asia.

That August, Mansfield returned to Cavite in preparation for his return to the United States and eventual discharge. On November 9, 1922, Private Mansfield was released from the Marine Corps on the completion of his enlistment. He was awarded the Good Conduct Medal, his character being described as "excellent" during his two years as a Marine.

== Education ==
Following his return to Montana in 1922, Mansfield worked as a "mucker" and shoveled ore and other waste in the copper mines of Butte for eight years. Having never attended high school, he gained admission to Montana School of Mines (MSM) in Butte by taking their entrance examinations. He attended MSM from 1927 to 1928, studying to become a mining engineer.

In 1928, Mansfield met Maureen Hayes, a local schoolteacher who would become his wife. She encouraged him to pursue further education. In December 1931, Mansfield began his studies at the University of Montana (UM) in Missoula, where he took both high school and college courses. Maureen moved to Missoula, and they married on September 13, 1932. She worked as a social worker, to help support Mansfield through his studies.

At the University of Montana, Mansfield joined the Alpha Tau Omega fraternity. In 1933, he earned both his high school equivalency and his Bachelor of Arts degree. He continued with graduate studies at UM, while also working part-time in the registrar's office and teaching two courses as a graduate assistant. He earned a Master of Arts degree from UM in 1934 with a thesis titled "American Diplomatic Relations with Korea, 1866–1910."

After completing his graduate studies, Mansfield accepted a position as administrator and professor at UM, teaching courses in Latin American and Far Eastern History, and occasionally lecturing on Greek and Roman history. Additionally, he studied towards a PhD at the University of California, Los Angeles (UCLA) from 1936 to 1937. Though he left UM in 1942 to enter politics, he remained a tenured Professor of History at the University of Montana until his death.

== U.S. Representative ==
In 1940, Mansfield ran for the Democratic nomination for the House of Representatives in Montana's 1st congressional district but was defeated by Jerry J. O'Connell, a former holder of the seat, in the primary. The general election was won by Republican Jeannette Rankin, who had previously won what was formerly an at-large seat in the House in 1916 and served until her defeat in 1920. Mansfield decided to run for the seat again in the following election and won it by defeating the businessman Howard K. Hazelbaker after Rankin, who had voted against the entry of the United States into World War II, decided not to run for what would have been her third term.

A new-comer to the House, who is reportedly internationalist-minded, having been professor of history and political science at Montana State University for ten years. Though a supporter of the Administration's foreign policy, he is likely to be strongly critical of the smallness of China's share of Lend-Lease, and of what he fears is the Administration's tendency to regard the Atlantic as more important than the Pacific, and of its apparent reluctance to regard the Chinese as an ally on equal footing. His strongly pro-Chinese sentiments may tend to make him somewhat anti-British on this score.

Mansfield served five terms in the House, being re-elected in 1944, 1946, 1948, and 1950. His military service and academic experience landed him a seat on the House Foreign Affairs Committee. He went to China on a special mission for US President Franklin D. Roosevelt in 1944 and served as a delegate to the ninth Inter-American Conference in Colombia in 1948. In 1951, he was appointed by President Harry S. Truman as a delegate to the United Nations' sixth session in Paris. During his House tenure, he also expressed his support for price controls, a higher minimum wage, the Marshall Plan, and aid to Turkey and Greece. He opposed the House Un-American Activities Committee, the Taft–Hartley Act, and the Twenty-second Amendment.

== U.S. Senator ==
In 1952, Mansfield was elected to the United States Senate after he had narrowly defeated the Republican incumbent, Zales Ecton. He served as Senate Majority Whip under Majority Leader Lyndon B. Johnson from 1957 to 1961. In 1961, after Johnson resigned from the Senate to become Vice President, Mansfield was unanimously elected the Democratic floor leader and thus Senate Majority Leader. Serving sixteen years, from 1961 until his retirement in 1977, Mansfield is the longest-serving Majority Leader in the history of the Senate. The Washington Post compared Mansfield's behavior as Majority Leader to Johnson's by saying, "Instead of Johnson's browbeating tactics, Mansfield led by setting an example of humility and accommodation."

External videos
- Presentation by Mansfield in the Old Senate Chamber, reflecting on his experiences in and observations about the Senate, March 24, 1998, C-SPAN

Mansfield was critical of US involvement in Laos. On December 28, 1960, he opined that US aid to Laos had produced nothing but "chaos, discontent, armies on the loose, and a large mission of hundreds of officials in Vientiane."

An early supporter of Ngo Dinh Diem, Mansfield altered his opinion on the Vietnam War after a visit to Vietnam in 1962. He reported to John F. Kennedy on December 2, 1962, that US money given to Diem's government was being squandered and that the US should avoid further involvement in Vietnam. He was thus the first American official to comment even mildly negatively on the war's condition.

On September 25, 1963, Mansfield introduced Kennedy during a joint appearance with him at the Yellowstone County Fairgrounds, Kennedy expressing his appreciation afterward and adding, "I know that those of you who live in Montana know something of his character and his high standard of public service, but I am not sure that you are completely aware of what a significant role he has played in the last three years in passing through the United States Senate measure after measure which strengthens this country at home and abroad."

Mansfield delivered a eulogy on November 24, 1963, as President Kennedy's casket lay in state in the Capitol rotunda, saying, "He gave that we might give of ourselves, that we might give to one another until there would be no room, no room at all, for the bigotry, the hatred, prejudice, and the arrogance which converged in that moment of horror to strike him down."

During the Johnson administration, Mansfield, convinced that it was a blunder based on just aims, became a skeptic of US involvement in the Vietnam War. In February 1965, he lobbied against escalating aerial bombardment of North Vietnam in the aftermath of Pleiku, arguing in a letter to the president that Operation Rolling Thunder would lead to a need for "vastly strengthened... American forces."

In 1964, Mansfield, as Senate Majority Leader, filed a procedural motion to have the Civil Rights Act of 1964 discussed by the whole Senate rather than by the Judiciary Committee, which had killed similar legislation seven years earlier. Mansfield voted in favor of the Civil Rights Acts of 1964 and 1968, as well as the 24th Amendment to the U.S. Constitution and the Voting Rights Act of 1965. Mansfield voted in favor of the initial Senate amendment to the Civil Rights Act of 1957 on August 7, 1957, but did not vote on the House amendment to the bill on August 29, 1957. Mansfield did not vote on the Civil Rights Act of 1960 or the confirmation of Thurgood Marshall to the U.S. Supreme Court. Mansfield co-sponsored Mark Hatfield's Neighborhood Government Act, which would have diverted social service provisions to neighborhood levels, and also supported the Comprehensive Child Development Act of 1971 and the Equal Rights Amendment in 1972.

He hailed the new Richard Nixon administration, especially the "Nixon Doctrine" announced at Guam in 1969 that the US would honor all treaty commitments, provide a nuclear umbrella for its allies, and supply weapons and technical assistance to countries where warranted without committing American forces to local conflicts.

In turn, Nixon turned to Mansfield for advice and as his liaison with the Senate on Vietnam. Nixon began a steady withdrawal and replacement of US troops shortly after he took office in January 1969, a policy supported by Mansfield. During his first term, Nixon reduced American forces by 95%, leaving only 24,200 in late 1972; the last ones left in March 1973.

During the economic crisis of 1971, Mansfield was not afraid to reach across the aisle to help the economy:

What we're in is not a Republican recession or a Democratic recession; both parties had much to do with bringing us where we are today. But we're facing a national situation which calls for the best which all of us can produce, because we know the results will be something which we will regret.

Mansfield attended the November 17, 1976, meeting between President-elect Jimmy Carter and Democratic congressional leaders in which Carter sought out support for a proposal to have the president's power to reorganize the government reinstated with potential to be vetoed by Congress.

=== Mansfield Amendments ===
Two controversial amendments by Mansfield limiting military funding of research were passed by Congress.

- The Mansfield Amendment of 1969, passed as part of the fiscal year 1970 Military Authorization Act (Public Law 91-121), prohibited military funding of research that lacked a direct or apparent relationship to specific military function. Through subsequent modification the Mansfield amendment moved the Department of Defense toward the support of more short-term applied research in universities. The amendment affected the military, such as research funding by the Office of Naval Research (ONR).
- The Mansfield Amendment of 1973 expressly limited appropriations for defense research through the Advanced Research Projects Agency, which is largely independent of the military, to projects with direct military application. This controversial amendment greatly reduced ARPA funding for many university-based computer projects, thereby forcing many American computer science experts to move to private sector research facilities such as Xerox PARC. However, for that very reason, the amendment is also credited with giving birth to the contemporary computer technology industry.

A later Mansfield Amendment, offered in 1971, called for the number of US troops stationed in Europe to be halved. On May 19, 1971, however, the Senate defeated the resolution 61–36.

== U.S. ambassador to Japan ==
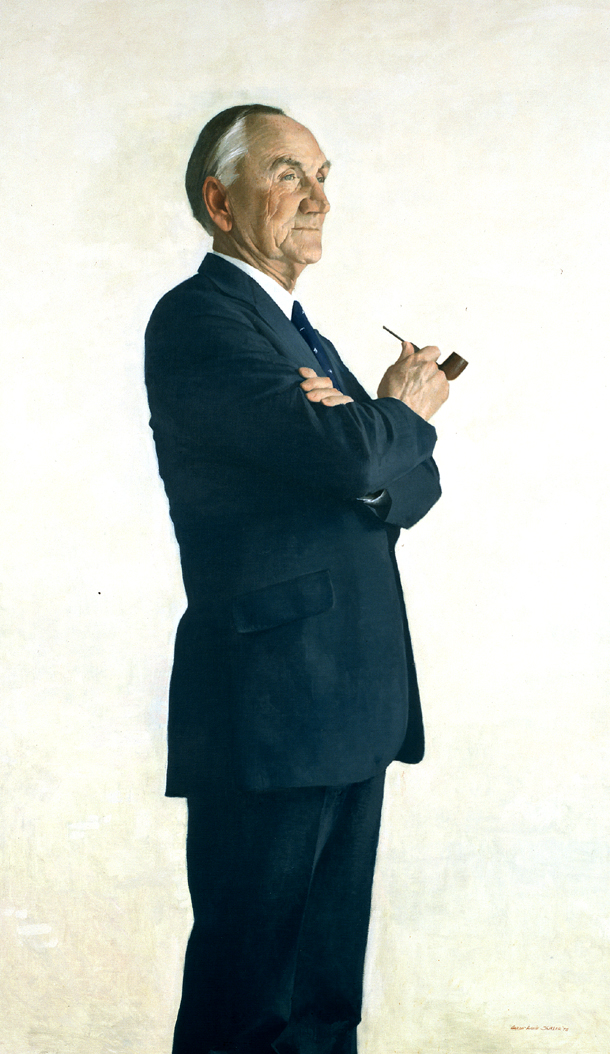
1978 painting of Mansfield

Mansfield did not run for reelection in 1976 and retired in January 1977; in April 1977 President Jimmy Carter appointed him as ambassador to Japan. a role that he retained during the Reagan administration until 1988. While serving in Japan, Mansfield was highly respected and was particularly renowned for describing the US-Japan relationship as the "most important bilateral relationship in the world, bar none." Mansfield's successor in Japan, Michael Armacost, noted in his memoirs that for Mansfield, the phrase was a "mantra." While in office, Mansfield also fostered relations between his home state of Montana and Japan. The state capital of Helena is the sister city to Kumamoto, on the island of Kyushu.

== Honors ==
The Maureen and Mike Mansfield Library at the University of Montana, Missoula, is named after him and his wife Maureen, as was his request when informed of the honor. The library also contains the Maureen and Mike Mansfield Center, which is dedicated to Asian studies, international relations, and the preservation and promotion of democracy. The Mike Mansfield Federal Building and United States Courthouse in Butte was renamed in his honor in 2002.

The Montana Democratic Party holds an annual Mansfield-Metcalf Dinner named partially in his honor.

In 1977, Mansfield received the US Senator John Heinz Award for Greatest Public Service by an Elected or Appointed Official, an award given out annually by Jefferson Awards.

In 1977, he was awarded the Laetare Medal by the University of Notre Dame, the oldest and most prestigious award for American Catholics.

On January 19, 1989, Mansfield and Secretary of State George P. Shultz were awarded the Presidential Medal of Freedom by President Ronald Reagan. In his speech, Reagan recognized Mansfield as someone who has "distinguished himself as a dedicated public servant and loyal American." In 1990, he was given both the United States Military Academy, Sylvanus Thayer Award and Japan's Order of the Rising Sun with Paulownia Flowers, Grand Cordon. This is Japan's highest honor for someone who is not a head of state.

In 1999, Missoula's daily newspaper, the Missoulian, chose Mansfield as The Most Influential Montanan of the 20th Century.

== Final years and death ==
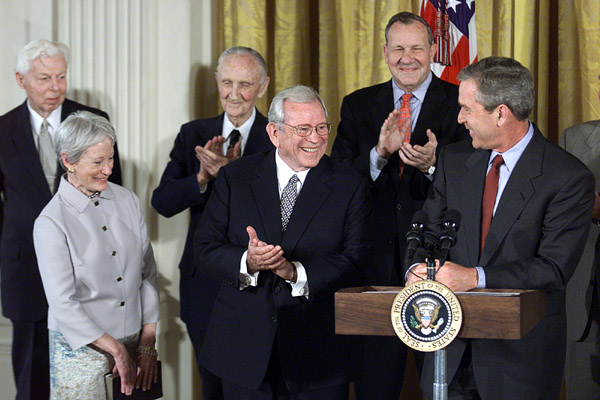
Just a few months before his death, Mansfield appears behind Howard Baker, the new U.S. Ambassador to Japan with President George W. Bush, June 26, 2001

Throughout his later years, Mansfield lived in Washington, D.C., where he remained active, delivering speaking engagements well into his nineties and working from his office at Goldman Sachs until the week before his death.

Mansfield's wife, Maureen, died on September 20, 2000. He died from heart failure at Walter Reed Army Medical Center just over one year later, on October 5, 2001, at the age of 98. He was survived by his daughter, Anne Fairclough Mansfield (1939–2013), and one granddaughter.

The burial plot of Mansfield and his wife can be found in section 2, marker 49-69F of Arlington National Cemetery. His gravemarker reads, "Michael Joseph Mansfield - PVT, US Marine Corps."

== See also ==
* List of United States political appointments that crossed party lines

- Maureen and Mike Mansfield Foundation

== General references ==
=== Print ===
- Johnson, Marc C. (2023). Mansfield and Dirksen: Bipartisan Giants of the Senate. University of Oklahoma Press. ISBN 978-0806192697.
- Oberdorfer, Don (2003). Senator Mansfield: The Extraordinary Life of a Great American Statesman and Diplomat. Soho Press. ISBN 1-58834-166-6.
- Olson, Gregory A. (1995). 'Mansfield and Vietnam, a Study in Rhetorical Adaptation. Michigan State University Press. online
- Valeo, Francis R. (1999). Mike Mansfield, Majority Leader: A Different Kind of Senate, 1961–1976. New York: M. E. Sharpe. ISBN 0-7656-0450-7. online
- Whalen, Charles and Barbara (1985). The Longest Debate: A Legislative History of the 1964 Civil Rights Act. Cabin John, Maryland: Seven Locks Press. ISBN 9780932020345.

=== Web ===
- "The Honorable Michael J. Mansfield". Who's Who in Marine Corps History. History Division, United States Marine Corps. Archived from the original on April 29, 2007.
- Thorne, Christopher (October 11, 2001). "Laid to Rest, A Tribute to Mike Mansfield". Associated Press. Archived from the original on October 14, 2004.

=== Interviews ===
- Mansfield, Mike (1988). "Mike Mansfield Interview, February-July 1998". Interviews with Mike Mansfield Oral History Project, 16 (Interview). Interviewed by Oberdorfer, Don. Missoula, Montana: Scholar Works, University of Montana.

U.S. House of Representatives
Preceded by Jeannette Rankin	Member of the US House of Representatives from Montana's 1st congressional district 1943–1953	Succeeded by Lee Metcalf
New office	Chair of the House Campaign Expenditures Committee; 1949–1951	Succeeded by Hale Boggs
Party political offices
Preceded by Leif Erickson	Democratic nominee for US Senator from Montana (Class 1); 1952, 1958, 1964, 1970	Succeeded by John Melcher
Preceded by Earle C. Clements	Senate Democratic Whip; 1957–1961	Succeeded by Hubert Humphrey
Preceded by Lyndon Johnson	Senate Democratic Leader; 1961–1977	Succeeded by Robert Byrd
Vacant Title last held by Howard Baker, George H. W. Bush, Peter Dominick, Gerald Ford, Robert Griffin, Thomas Kuchel, Mel Laird, Bob Mathias, George Murphy, Dick Poff, Chuck Percy, Al Quie, Charlotte Reid, Hugh Scott, Bill Steiger, John Tower	Response to the State of the Union address 1970, 1971; Served alongside: Donald Fraser, Scoop Jackson, John McCormack, Patsy Mink, Ed Muskie, Bill Proxmire	Succeeded by Carl Albert, Lloyd Bentsen, Hale Boggs, John Brademas, Frank Church, Thomas Eagleton, Martha Griffiths, John Melcher, Ralph Metcalfe, William Proxmire, Leonor Sullivan
Vacant Title last held by Carl Albert, Lloyd Bentsen, Hale Boggs, John Brademas, Frank Church, Thomas Eagleton, Martha Griffiths, John Melcher, Ralph Metcalfe, William Proxmire, Leonor Sullivan	Response to the State of the Union address 1974	Succeeded by Carl Albert; Hubert Humphrey
U.S. Senate
Preceded by Zales Ecton	US Senator (Class 1) from Montana; 1953–1977; Served alongside: James E. Murray, Lee Metcalf	Succeeded by John Melcher
Preceded by Earle C. Clements	Senate Majority Whip; 1957–1961	Succeeded by Hubert Humphrey
Preceded by Thomas C. Hennings Jr.	Chair of the Senate Rules Committee; 1960–1963	Succeeded by B. Everett Jordan
Preceded by Lyndon Johnson	Senate Majority Leader; 1961–1977	Succeeded by Robert Byrd
New office	Chair of the Senate Secret Documents Committee; 1972–1973	Position abolished
Diplomatic posts
Preceded by James Day Hodgson	United States Ambassador to Japan; 1977–1988	Succeeded by Michael Armacost
Awards
Preceded by Ronald Reagan	Recipient of the Sylvanus Thayer Award; 1990	Succeeded by Paul Nitze
Honorary titles
Preceded by Ellis Y. Berry	Oldest living United States representative (sitting or former); April 1, 1999 – October 5, 2001	Succeeded by John G. Dow
