= Zales Ecton =

American politician (1898–1961)

Zales Nelson Ecton
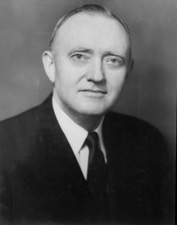

United States Senator from Montana
- In office January 3, 1947 – January 3, 1953
- Preceded by: Burton K. Wheeler
- Succeeded by: Mike Mansfield

Member of the Montana Senate
- In office 1937–1946

Member of the Montana House of Representatives
- In office 1933–1937

Personal details
- Born: April 1, 1898 Weldon, Iowa, U.S.
- Died: March 3, 1961 (aged 62) Bozeman, Montana, U.S.
- Resting place: Sunset Hills Cemetery
- Party: Republican
- Spouse: Vera Harris (m. 1920)
- Children: 2
- Education: Montana State University (BS); University of Chicago (JD)

Zales Nelson Ecton (April 1, 1898 – March 3, 1961) was an American attorney and Republican politician from Montana who represented the state in the United States Senate, serving from 1947 to 1953.

== Early life and education ==
Ecton was born in Weldon, Iowa on April 1, 1898. He moved with his family to Gallatin County, Montana in 1907, when he was nine years old. He attended the Gallatin County public schools. He earned a Bachelor of Science degree in business from Montana State College and a J.D. from the University of Chicago Law School.

== Career ==
In 1921, he became a rancher and gained interests in grain and livestock.

Entering politics, Ecton was a member of the Montana House of Representatives from 1933 to 1935 and the Montana Senate from 1936 to 1946. In 1946, he ran for the Montana United States Senate seat which was being vacated by Democrat Burton K. Wheeler, who had lost the Democratic primary.

As part of the Republican wave of the Senate in 1946, Ecton defeated Democratic former state Supreme Court Justice Leif Erickson by a vote of 54% to 46%. He served in the Senate for one term, having been narrowly defeated for reelection in 1952 by U.S. Representative Mike Mansfield, a Democratic college professor and Far Eastern expert.

While in the Senate, Ecton served on the United States Senate Committee on Appropriations, the United States Senate Committee on Energy and Natural Resources, the Committee on the United States Post Office and Civil Service, and the United States Senate Committee on Energy and Natural Resources.

Ecton was the only Republican U.S. senator from Montana for over 75 years, between Joseph M. Dixon's failed re-election bid in 1913 and the 1988 election of Conrad Burns, who served from 1989 to 2007. Ecton's papers are held by Archives and Special Collections at Montana State University.

== Personal life ==
In 1921, Ecton married Vera Harris. The couple had two children, Eloise and Zales N. Jr.

Ecton resumed his ranching business until his death in Bozeman, Montana on March 3, 1961, four weeks before his 63rd birthday. He was interred in Sunset Hills Cemetery.

Party political offices
Preceded by E. K. Cheadle	Republican nominee for U.S. Senator from Montana (Class 1); 1946, 1952	Succeeded by Lou Welch
U.S. Senate
Preceded by Burton K. Wheeler	U.S. senator (Class 1) from Montana; 1947–1953; Served alongside: James Edward Murray	Succeeded by Mike Mansfield
