= Ocular (disambiguation) =

Ocular is an adjective that refers to the eye, an organ of vision that detects light.

Ocular may also refer to:

- Eyepiece, the optical element closest to the eye in a telescope or microscope
- Ocular scales, a type of scales surrounding the eyes of scaled reptiles
- "Ocular", a 2015 song from Debris by Filipino alternative rock band Sandwich
