= 1958 United States Senate election in Montana =

- November 4, 1958
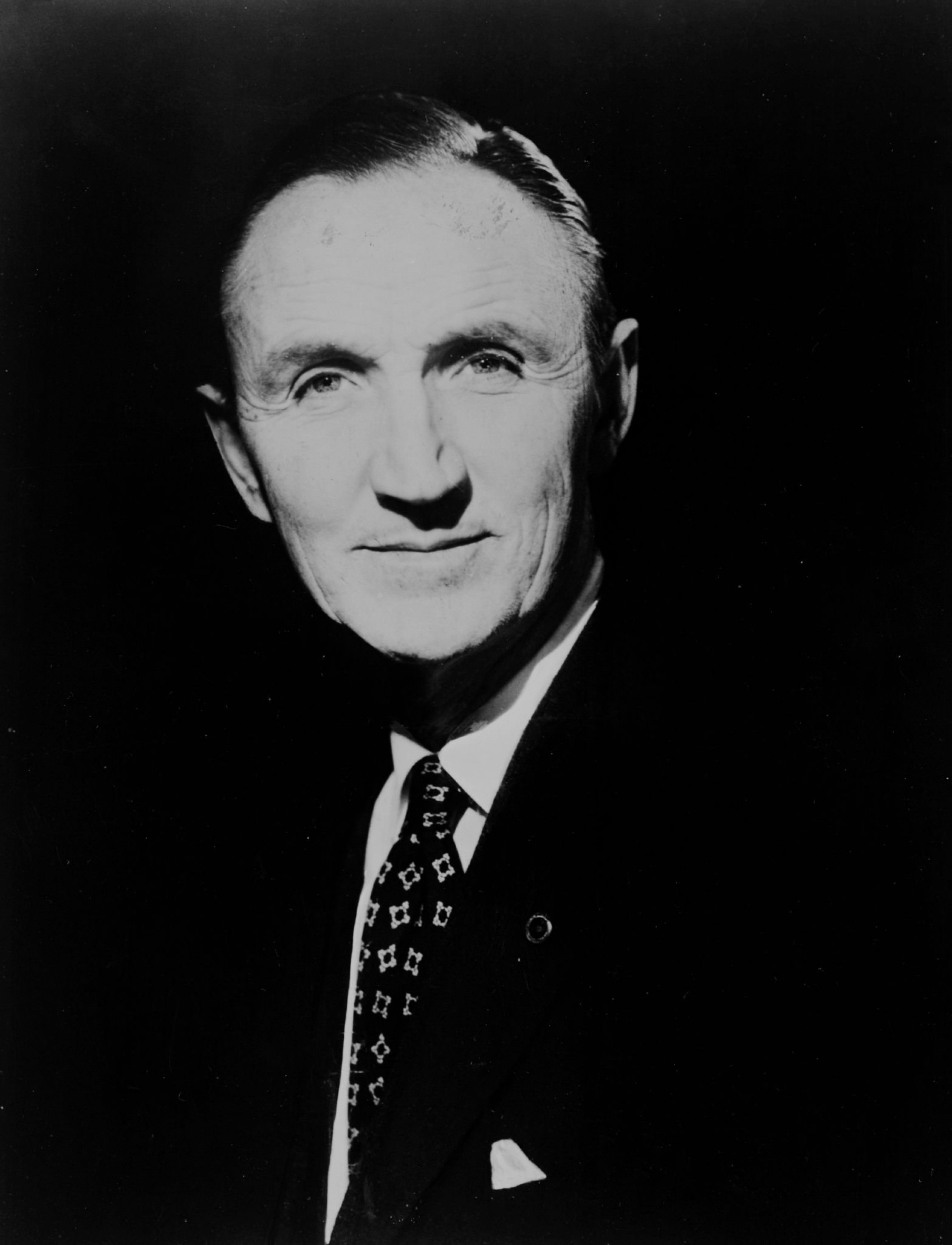

Nominee	Mike Mansfield	Lou Welch
Party	Democratic	Republican
Popular vote	174,910	54,573
Percentage	76.22%	23.78%
- County results Mansfield: 50–60% 60–70% 70–80% 80–90%
U.S. senator before election
Mike Mansfield
Democratic
Elected U.S. Senator
Mike Mansfield
Democratic

The 1958 United States Senate election in Montana took place on November 4, 1958. Incumbent United States Senator Mike Mansfield, who was first elected to the Senate in 1952, ran for re-election. Mansfield won the Democratic primary comfortably, and moved on to the general election, where he was opposed by Lou W. Welch, a millworker and the Republican nominee. In contrast to the close campaign in 1952, Mansfield defeated Welch in a landslide and won his second term in the Senate easily.

== Democratic primary ==
=== Candidates ===
- Mike Mansfield, incumbent United States Senator
- J. M. Nickey
- Thomas G. Stimatz, former State Representative

=== Results ===
Democratic Party primary results
Party	Candidate	Votes	%
Democratic	Mike Mansfield (inc.)	97,207	91.72
Democratic	J. M. Nickey	4,710	4.44
Democratic	Thomas G. Stimatz	4,061	3.83
Total votes		105,978	100.00

== Republican primary ==
=== Candidates ===
- Lou W. Welch, millworker
- Blanche Anderson

=== Results ===
Republican Primary results
Party	Candidate	Votes	%
Republican	Lou W. Welch	19,860	50.30
Republican	Blanche Anderson	19,624	49.70
Total votes		39,484	100.00

== General election ==
=== Results ===
United States Senate election in Montana, 1958
Party	Candidate	Votes	%	±%
Democratic	Mike Mansfield (inc.)	174,910	76.22%	+25.47%
Republican	Lou W. Welch	54,573	23.78%	−24.77%
Majority		120,337	52.44%	+50.25%
Turnout		229,483		
Democratic hold		Swing		

== See also ==
- 1958 United States Senate elections
