= 1952 United States Senate election in Montana =

- November 4, 1952
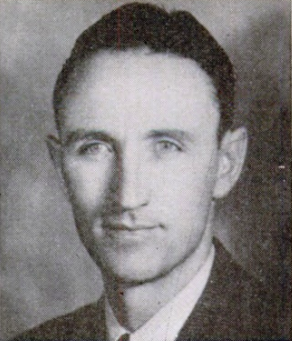

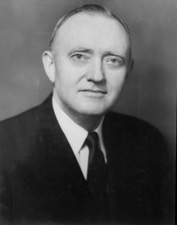
Nominee	Mike Mansfield	Zales Ecton
Party	Democratic	Republican
Popular vote	133,109	127,360
Percentage	50.75%	48.56%
- County results Mansfield: 40–50% 50–60% 60–70% 70–80% Ecton: 50–60% 60–70% 70–80%
U.S. senator before election
Zales Ecton
Republican
Elected U.S. Senator
Mike Mansfield
Democratic

The 1952 United States Senate election in Montana took place on November 4, 1952. Incumbent United States Senator Zales Ecton, who was first elected to the Senate in 1946, ran for re-election. Ecton won the Republican primary uncontested, and advanced to the general election, where he faced Mike Mansfield, the United States Congressman from Montana's 1st congressional district and the Democratic nominee. Following a close campaign, Mansfield narrowly defeated Ecton, winning his first of four terms in the Senate.

== Democratic primary ==
=== Candidates ===
- Mike Mansfield, United States Congressman from Montana's 1st congressional district

=== Results ===
Democratic Party primary results
Party	Candidate	Votes	%
Democratic	Mike Mansfield	74,239	100.00
Total votes		74,239	100.00

== Republican primary ==
=== Candidates ===
- Zales Ecton, incumbent United States Senator

=== Results ===
Republican Primary results
Party	Candidate	Votes	%
Republican	Zales Ecton (incumbent)	71,629	100.00
Total votes		71,629	100.00

== General election ==
=== Results ===
United States Senate election in Montana, 1952
Party	Candidate	Votes	%	±%
Democratic	Mike Mansfield	133,109	50.75%	+5.37%
Republican	Zales Ecton (incumbent)	127,360	48.56%	−4.92%
Progressive	Larry Price	1,828	0.70%	
Majority		5,749	2.19%	−5.90%
Turnout		262,297		
Democratic gain from Republican		Swing		
