= 1946 United States Senate election in Montana =

- November 5, 1946
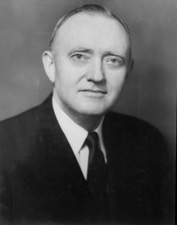

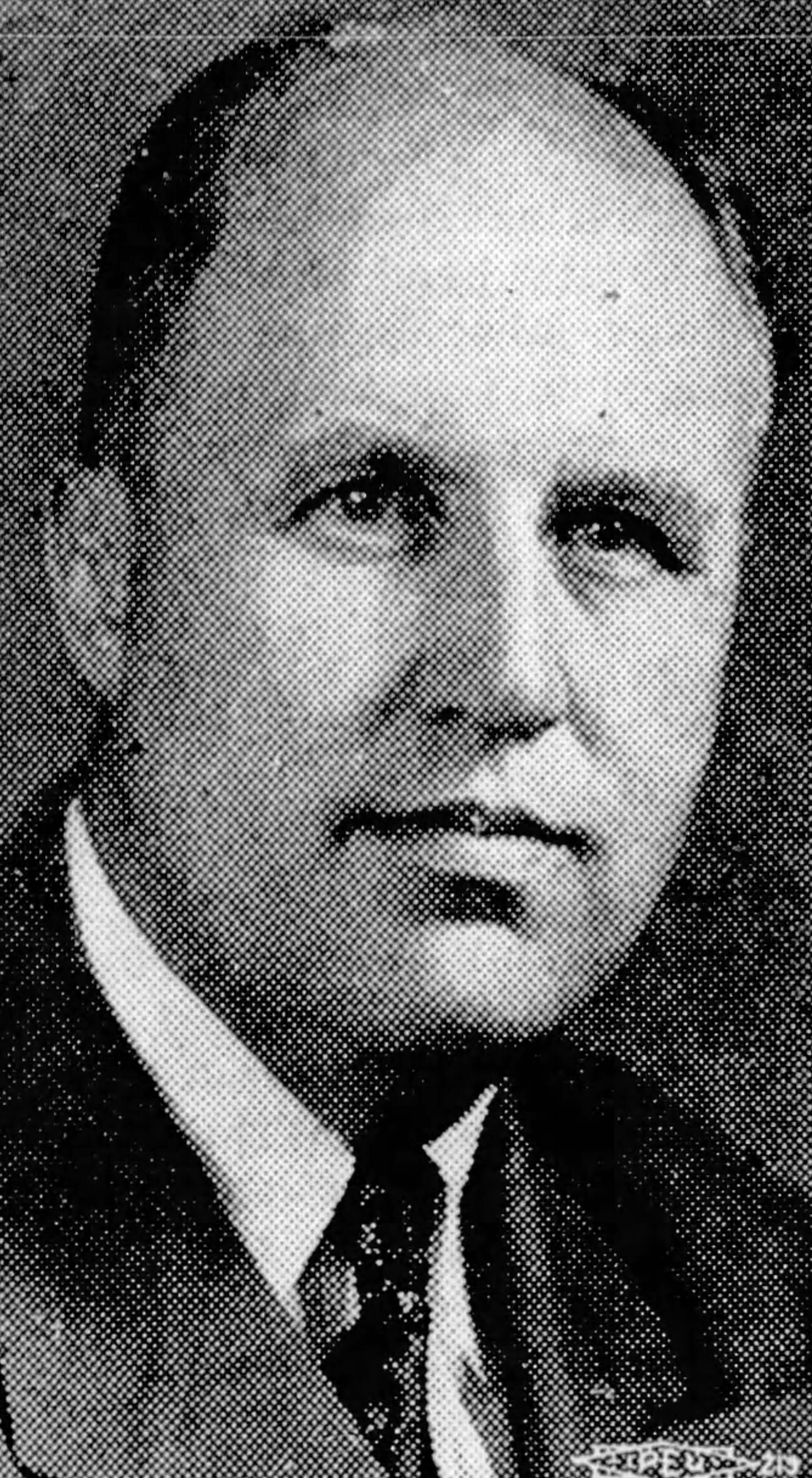
Nominee	Zales Ecton	Leif Erickson
Party	Republican	Democratic
Popular vote	101,901	86,476
Percentage	53.47%	45.38%
- County results Ecton: 50–60% 60–70% 70–80% Erickson: 40–50% 50–60% 60–70% No data
U.S. senator before election
Burton K. Wheeler
Democratic
Elected U.S. Senator
Zales Ecton
Republican

The 1946 United States Senate election in Montana took place on November 5, 1946. Incumbent United States Senator Burton K. Wheeler, who was first elected to the Senate in 1922, and was re-elected in 1928, 1934, and 1940, ran for re-election. He was challenged in the Democratic primary by Leif Erickson, the Chief Justice of the Montana Supreme Court, and, following a close election, was narrowly defeated by Erickson. In the general election, Erickson faced State Senator Zales Ecton, the Republican nominee. Ultimately, Ecton defeated Erickson by a fairly wide margin, winning his first and only term in the Senate. Another Republican would not be elected Senator from Montana until 42 years later, when Conrad Burns narrowly won the 1988 election.

== Democratic primary ==
=== Candidates ===
- Leif Erickson, Chief Justice of the Montana Supreme Court
- Burton K. Wheeler, incumbent United States Senator

=== Results ===
Democratic Primary results by county: Erickson: 50–60%; 60–70%; Wheeler: 50–60%; 60–70%; 70–80%

Democratic Party primary results
Party	Candidate	Votes	%
Democratic	Leif Erickson	49,419	52.61
Democratic	Burton K. Wheeler (incumbent)	44,513	47.39
Total votes		93,932	100.00

== Republican primary ==
=== Candidates ===
- Zales Ecton, State Senator, former State Representative
- R. E. Skeen, railroad brakeman

=== Results ===
Republican Primary results
Party	Candidate	Votes	%
Republican	Zales Ecton	22,731	66.94
Republican	R. E. Skeen	11,226	33.06
Total votes		33,957	100.00

== General election ==
=== Results ===
United States Senate election in Montana, 1946
Party	Candidate	Votes	%	±%
Republican	Zales Ecton	101,901	53.47%	+26.91%
Democratic	Leif Erickson	86,476	45.38%	−28.06%
Socialist	Floyd P. Jones	2,189	1.15%	
Majority		15,425	8.09%	−38.78%
Turnout		190,566		
Republican gain from Democratic		Swing		
