= Occulus =

- Occulus as depicted in Fantastic Four #363 (April 1992).

Publication information
- Publisher: Marvel Comics
- First appearance: Fantastic Four #363 (April 1992)
- Created by: Tom DeFalco (writer); Paul Ryan (artist)

In-story information
- Alter ego: Occulus
- Species: Extradimensional (Inniverse) mutant/mutate
- Team affiliations: The Gem Guild
- Notable aliases: The Unforgiving One; Doc Occulus
- Abilities: Superhuman strength and durability; Energy manipulation; Force field generation; Flight

Occulus is a supervillain appearing in American comic books published by Marvel Comics, usually as an enemy of the Fantastic Four. He was one of the first villains imprisoned in the Negative Zone prison.

== Publication history ==
Occulus first appeared in Fantastic Four #363 (April 1992). He was rarely used as a character, appearing only a few times in the 1990's and 2005, being last depicted in Dan Slott's Spider-Man/Human Torch #5 (July 2005).

== Fictional character biography ==
Occulus and his brother Wildblood originate from a planet in the Inniverse, an alternate dimension. After being orphaned, they were taken in by the Gem Guild and tested to uncover if they could manipulate the energy of the gems which adorned the skies of the Inniverse. Occulus was found to have the talent and was spirited away by the Guild, but Wildblood proved of no value. Pampered by the Guild and instructed by Dangor, Occulus grew in knowledge and power. Eventually, he removed his right eye in an attempt to gain more power.

Occulus sends a squadron of soldiers to capture Wildblood. They detected a portal to Earth-616, created by Reed Richards, through which Wildblood had passed. Occulus's group passes through the portal and abduct Wildblood, Invisible Woman, and Franklin Richards, taking them all back to the Inniverse.

Occulus uses Dangor's machine to tap into Franklin's latent power to increase his own powers. His powers vastly amplified, Occulus attacks Wildblood and his rebels. Following Reed's instructions, the Rebels create a giant Gem Screen with a charge opposite to that of Occulus. When activated, the screen casts Occulus into space.

Occulus once stole the arms of Doctor Octopus, becoming "Doc Occulus." He battled the Human Torch and Spider-Man. In the present, Occulus attends a gathering of enemies of the Fantastic Four held by the Puppet Master, who suggests that they form an alliance. Occulus leaves without even acknowledging Puppet Master's scheme, unaware that the Mad Thinker had obtained a DNA sample from him. The Fantastic Four later capture Occulus and transfer him to a prison in the Negative Zone.

== Powers and abilities ==
Occulus is a mutant of his species with the ability to harness the energy of the crystals originating from his homeworld. This gives him the ability to fly, manipulate energy, generate force fields, and perceive otherwise invisible objects. Additionally, he is a skilled martial artist and strategist.
