= 1970 United States Senate election in Connecticut =

- November 3, 1970
- Turnout: 80.5%
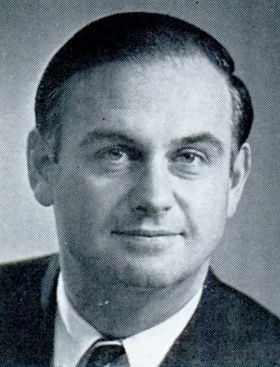

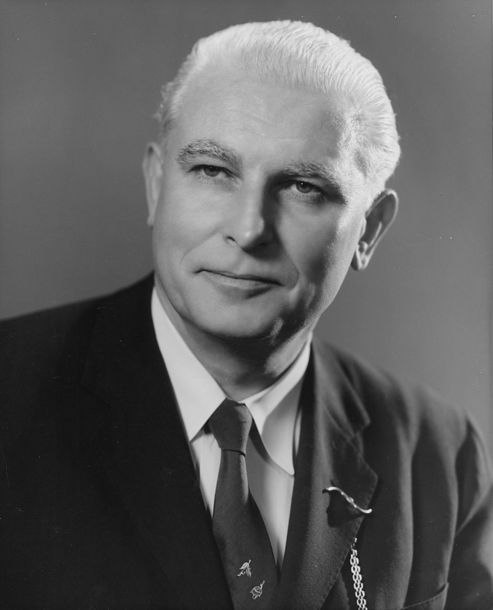
Nominee	Lowell Weicker	Joseph Duffey	Thomas J. Dodd
Party	Republican	Democratic	Independent
Popular vote	454,721	368,111	266,497
Percentage	41.74%	33.79%	24.46%
- Weicker: 30–40% 40–50% 50–60% 60–70% 70–80% Duffey: 30–40% 40–50% Dodd: 30–40% 40–50%
U.S. senator before election
Thomas J. Dodd
Democratic
Elected U.S. Senator
Lowell Weicker
Republican

The United States Senate election of 1970 in Connecticut was held on November 3, 1970. Incumbent Democratic Senator Thomas J. Dodd ran for a third term in office. After Dodd was censured in the Senate's first modern ethics case, he lost party support for re-election but stood as an independent. Republican U.S. Representative Lowell Weicker defeated Dodd and Democratic candidate Joseph Duffey.

== Background ==
In January 1966, Drew Pearson and Jack Anderson published a series of syndicated newspaper columns describing Senator Thomas J. Dodd's association with Julius Klein, a West German public relations consultant. The columns alleged that Dodd had engaged in fundraising improprieties and had diverted campaign funds for personal expenses. A formal Senate investigation ensued which lasted over one year, finding that Dodd had traveled to West Germany at Klein's behest and had transferred campaign funds to his personal accounts. Dodd initially refused to cooperate with the investigation by withholding financial statements and bringing several legal challenges against the committee; the committee responded by holding public hearings on the matter which severely damaged Dodd's reputation.

On June 23, 1967, the Senate voted to censure Dodd by a vote of 92 to 5. His was the seventh censure in the history of the United States Senate and the first focused on financial impropriety. The resolution stated that Dodd had used his office as a United States senator "to obtain and use for his personal benefit, funds from the public through political testimonials and a political campaign," conduct which was "contrary to accepted morals, derogates from the public trust expected of a Senator, and tends to bring the Senate into dishonor and disrepute." Dodd stated in response, "I believe now, I shall continue to believe, that history will justify my conduct and my character." The Senate adopted four new rules of ethical disclosure, including a form of financial disclosure, in 1968.

== Democratic primary ==
=== Candidates ===
- Alphonsus Donahue, Stamford businessman
- Joseph Duffey, anti-war activist
- Edward L. Marcus, Majority Leader of the Connecticut Senate from the 11th district

=== Results ===
1970 Democratic Senate primary
Party	Candidate	Votes	%
Democratic	Joseph Duffey	79,166	43.55%
Democratic	Alphonsus Donahue	66,916	36.81%
Democratic	Edward L. Marcus	35,715	19.64%
Total votes		181,797	100.00%

== Republican primary ==
=== Candidates ===
- John Lupton, State Senator from Westport
- Lowell Weicker, U.S. Representative from Greenwich

=== Results ===
Results by municipality: Weicker: 50–60%; 60–70%; 70–80%; 80–90%; Lupton: 50–60%; 60–70%; 70–80%; Tie

1970 Republican Senate primary
Party	Candidate	Votes	%
Republican	Lowell Weicker	77,057	60.34%
Republican	John Lupton	50,657	39.66%
Total votes		127,714	100.00%

== General election ==
=== Candidates ===
- Thomas J. Dodd, incumbent U.S. Senator since 1959 (Independent)
- Joseph Duffey, anti-war activist (Democratic)
- Lowell Weicker, U.S. Representative from Greenwich (Republican)

=== Results ===
United States Senate election in Connecticut, 1970
Party	Candidate	Votes	%
Republican	Lowell Weicker	454,721	41.74%
Democratic	Joseph Duffey	368,111	33.79%
Independent	Thomas J. Dodd (incumbent)	266,497	24.46%
Total votes		1,089,329	100.00%
Republican gain from Democratic			

== Aftermath ==
Lowell Weicker was re-elected twice in 1976 and 1982 before losing a bid for a third term to Joe Lieberman in 1988. He served one term as Governor of Connecticut from 1991 to 1995. He briefly ran for President in 1980.

Thomas J. Dodd died suddenly of a heart attack on May 24, 1971. Newspaper obituaries noted that the senator had steadfastly claimed that he was innocent until the moment of his death. His son, Christopher, would join Weicker as the junior senator from Connecticut in 1981 and ran for President in 2008.

Joseph Duffey retired from electoral politics but led a long career in academia and public office, serving in both the Jimmy Carter and Bill Clinton administrations. He married his campaign manager, Anne Wexler, in 1974 after both had divorced their spouses.
