= Anne Wexler =

American activist (1930–2009)

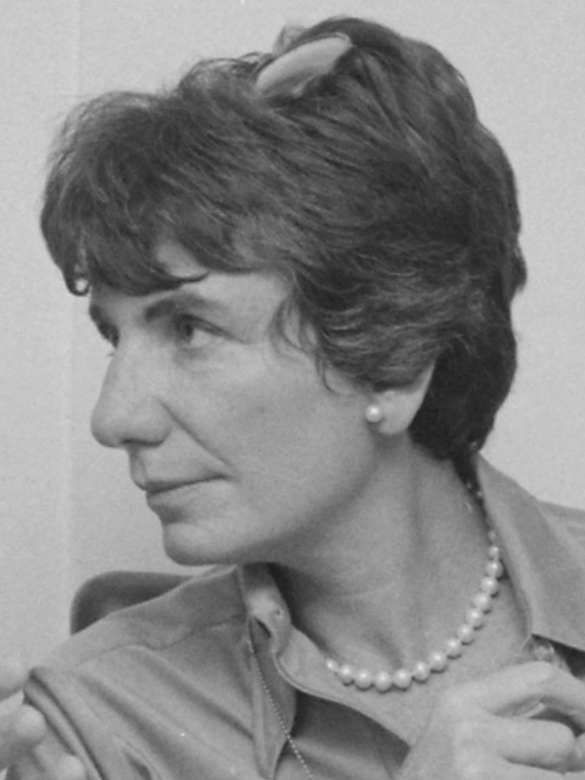
- Wexler at the White House in 1978

Director of the Office of Public Liaison
- In office September 1, 1978 – January 20, 1981
- President: Jimmy Carter
- Preceded by: Midge Costanza
- Succeeded by: Elizabeth Dole

Personal details
- Born: Anne Levy; February 10, 1930 New York City, New York, U.S.
- Died: August 7, 2009 (aged 79) Washington, D.C., U.S.
- Party: Democratic
- Spouse: Joseph Duffey (m. 1974)
- Children: 4
- Education: Skidmore College (BA)

Anne Levy Wexler (February 10, 1930 – August 7, 2009) was an influential American Democratic political consultant, public policy advisor, and later the first woman to head a leading lobbying firm in Washington, D.C.

== Early life and education ==
She was born as Anne Levy on February 10, 1930, in Manhattan, the daughter of Leon R. Levy, a prominent architect who designed the New York Coliseum. Her first involvement in politics was ringing doorbells for Harry S. Truman as a history major at Skidmore College.

She married ophthalmologist Richard Wexler two weeks after her 1951 graduation. As a housewife in Westport, Connecticut, she described herself as having "all the Jewish princess stuff—a lovely home, a full-time maid, lots of vacations" before she started becoming involved in politics.

== Political career ==
In the 1960s, Wexler began her political career by serving on the Westport Zoning Board of Appeals and by helping John Fitzgerald organize a Congressional campaign against the pro-Vietnam war Democratic incumbent Donald J. Irwin. She organized the Connecticut effort for Eugene McCarthy's 1968 presidential campaign, and served on the rules committee at the 1968 Democratic National Convention in Chicago, where she was the primary author of the committee's minority report, whose recommendations on reforms in choosing delegates were later accepted.

She managed the 1970 United States Senate campaign in Connecticut for Democrat Joseph Duffey, a Democrat who came in second to Republican Lowell P. Weicker Jr., with incumbent Thomas J. Dodd coming in third. Bill and Hillary Clinton, then students at Yale Law School, were recruited among the campaign's volunteer workers. (Mrs. Clinton, while running for president in 2008, credited Wexler with providing her first political job.)

After a divorce from her first husband, in September 1974, Wexler married Duffey, who would later head the National Endowment for the Humanities and the United States Information Agency.

Working for Common Cause in 1971, Wexler headed a short-lived voting rights effort before directing the 1972 presidential campaign of Democrat Edmund Muskie. When Muskie dropped out of the race, she led a voter registration campaign for Democratic nominee George McGovern, who was defeated by Richard Nixon in the general election.

Rolling Stone magazine hired Wexler as an associate publisher in 1973, where her duties managing political reporting included overseeing the notoriously unconventional Gonzo journalist Hunter S. Thompson, who would sometimes stay at the Duffey-Wexler residence while in Washington, D.C.

=== Carter administration ===
During the 1976 presidential election, Wexler worked for the Jimmy Carter campaign and served on his transition team after Carter's victory over Gerald Ford. Being responsible for screening candidates for top-level positions, she recommended the little-known Juanita M. Kreps as the first woman to become United States Secretary of Commerce. Wexler herself then became undersecretary of the Department of Commerce.

Wexler later moved to the White House, succeeding Midge Costanza as special assistant to President Carter for public outreach within the White House Office of Public Engagement and Intergovernmental Affairs. In that role, she set up meetings with the President with hundreds of business and opinion leaders, working to get their support for Carter's agenda as part of an effort she described as intended to "create lobbyists" by "educating people on the substance of the issues". Assisted by her efforts, Carter was able to secure passage of the Torrijos-Carter Treaties that would lead to the end of U.S. control over the Panama Canal, as well as deregulation of the airlines, trucking industry and newly found natural gas.

Then-White House Deputy Chief of Staff Hamilton Jordan described her in 1978 as "the most competent woman in Democratic politics in this country".

== Lobbying ==
Immediately after the Carter administration ended with the election of Ronald Reagan to the presidency in 1980, Wexler established what would become one of the leading lobbying firms in Washington, Wexler & Walker Public Policy Associates,

Described by The Washington Post as "the first woman to own a lobbying firm", she later recalled her entry into a field that "was completely male dominated". She ensured that the firm had a bipartisan base, bringing in Ronald Reagan friend Nancy Clark Reynolds and hired former Republican congressman (and Newt Gingrich ally) Robert Smith Walker of Pennsylvania after he left office in 1997.

The firm's clients included General Motors and the government of Australia, which honored her as an Officer of the Order of Australia for her meritorious service. Her firm was acquired by Hill & Knowlton in 1990, within which it operated independently.

Called the "Rolodex Queen" for the number and scope of her contacts, and lauded by Washingtonian magazine as "easily the most influential female lobbyist" in the capital, she credited her success to fulfilling the lobbyist's responsibility of guiding legislators through the pros and cons of complex legislation, a process that "government officials are not comfortable making ... by themselves."

== Death ==
She died at the age of 79 on August 7, 2009, in her home in Washington, D.C. from cancer. Wexler had had breast cancer since being diagnosed in 1981. She was survived by her second husband, Joseph Duffey; two sons from her first marriage, David and Daniel Wexler; stepsons, Michael and David Duffey; and four grandchildren.

Political offices
Preceded by Midge Costanza	Director of the Office of Public Liaison; 1978–1981	Succeeded by Elizabeth Dole
