= Benjamin Ladner =

American academic

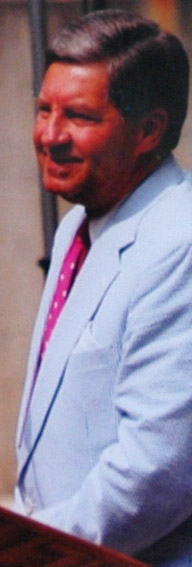
Ladner during a commencement ceremony

Benjamin Mance Ladner (born October 30, 1941) is an academic expert in the fields of philosophy and religion. He was president of American University from 1994 to 2005, when he was ousted.

His areas of professional interest and research are international relations and the role of higher education; education administration; religion and contemporary culture; and NCAA collegiate athletics.

Ladner was previously married to Carolyn Cooper, with whom he had two sons, David and Mark, and later remarried to Nancy Bullard.

== Education ==
Ladner was born in Mobile, Alabama. He attended Murphy High School in Mobile followed by undergraduate study at Baylor University, receiving his Bachelor of Arts in 1963. Ladner earned a Bachelor of Divinity from Southern Seminary in 1966 and his Doctor of Philosophy from Duke University in 1970. His dissertation was on Elizabeth Sewell.

Ladner has also been awarded honorary doctorates from Elizabethtown College, Sookmyung Women's University (South Korea) and Tashkent State Economic University (Uzbekistan).

== Career ==
Ladner began his academic career as a professor of philosophy and religion at the University of North Carolina at Greensboro where he taught for more than a decade. While there, Ladner won the University Teaching Excellence Award and was elected to the National Faculty of Arts, Humanities, and Sciences in 1975, an association of university professors founded by Phi Beta Kappa. He served as its president from 1980 to 1994.

== American University ==
In 1994, Ladner was appointed president of, and professor of philosophy and religion at, American University in Washington D.C. His appointment is credited with bringing stability to the university after a period of turmoil and rapid turnover of presidents. During his tenure, the university experienced financial and academic growth, along with recognition as a leading international university, that partnered with and helped found new universities around the world. The main thrust of Ladner's leadership was defined in a "15 point plan" in 2001, which was approved by faculty, staff and the board.

During his tenure as president at American University, Ladner chaired the board of trustees of the Consortium of Universities of the Washington Metropolitan Area, the Patriot League Council of Presidents, and served on numerous other boards and commissions including the National Collegiate Athletic Association (NCAA), the Washington Board of Trade, and the Committee for Economic Development, and the Commission on International Education for the American Council on Education.

He was also a member of the Commission on Federal Election Reform, co-chaired by Jimmy Carter and James Baker; the NCAA Presidential Task Force on the Future of Intercollegiate Athletics; and a United Nations Advisory Group member and manuscript reviewer for the ground-breaking Arab Human Development Report of 2002.

In 2003, Ladner fired Susan Clampitt as the head of university-owned radio station, WAMU, due to donor and staff outrage at fiscal mismanagement of the NPR affiliate. Clampitt later sued both Ladner and the university, claiming that Ladner had approved all of her financial decisions, which depleted a $4 million endowment for the station. The court of appeals subsequently denied Clampitt's employment-related claims.

=== Work abroad ===
Ladner helped secure the release of individuals jailed for human rights protests and activities in the Palestinian Territories (West Bank) and Burma (Myanmar). Additionally, he led a series of face-to-face talks between Israeli and Palestinian leaders in Ramallah, Jerusalem, and Washington, D.C. in 2003 and 2004.

In 2001, Ladner negotiated with the Chinese government for the release of Gao Zhan, after she was held while being charged as a spy for the United States. Later, it was discovered that Zhan was actually a spy for the People's Republic of China, and she was charged with tax fraud and espionage by the United States but charges were dismissed and she was placed in protective custody after she participated in a CIA operation.

Under Ladner's leadership, American University expanded its reach abroad after being selected as the primary contracting institution to develop and manage two new universities, on in the United Arab Emirates (UAE) and the other in Nigeria.

The Nigerian university, originally known as ABTI-American University (AAUN) and now called the American University of Nigeria (AUN), attracts students from all over Africa and around the world seeking an American style education. Unlike most universities in the country, AAUN offers a four-year undergraduate degree program divided among two years of general study followed by two of concentrated study in a major. This differs from most Nigerian universities which follow the British model in which students take classes only in their major.

In the UAE, American University established the American University of Sharjah.

== Resignation from presidency of American University ==
The website BenLadner.com was created by students at the university in 2002 to highlight these criticisms, specifically Ladner's salary. In September 2004, Ladner filed a complaint with ICANN, alleging that the website's prominent use of his name caused confusion for visitors, causing them to believe it to be his own personal website. ICANN ruled against Ladner, refusing to remove the domain name because Ladner's name had no commercial value.

A note similar to the one sent to the board of trustees, sent to student leaders

In August 2005, The Washington Post reported on the opening of an investigation by the American University Board of Trustees into Ladner's expenses. An anonymous letter to the board, later revealed to be from Ladner's fired driver Reginald Green, alleged that Ladner had improperly used university funds for personal expenses. Ladner was placed on administrative leave by the board pending the outcome of the investigation. On August 25, he was suspended from his post. On October 10, 2005, AU's Board of Trustees dismissed Ladner as university president. Ladner was a controversial figure. Following his ouster, the Washington Post noted that friends described him "as an honorable, charismatic leader" while a growing number of critics viewed him as "unethical, manipulative and imperious", citing the university investigation that found that Ladners and his wife spent university funds "on foie gras, limousines, French wine and family parties."

Ladner was given a $3.75 million severance package, causing two trustees to resign.

On April 1, 2006, Harry Jaffe wrote an article published in the Washingtonian magazine summarizing Ladner's reign and fall at American University, detailing expenses and the board of trustees' tussle in support and against the president, including attorneys' advice that there was no enforceable contract and that Ladner was terminated for "cause or dishonesty".

Preceded by Joseph Duffey	President, American University; 1994–2005	Succeeded by Cornelius M. Kerwin
