= Richard E. Berendzen =

American astronomer (1938–2022)

Richard Berendzen PhD
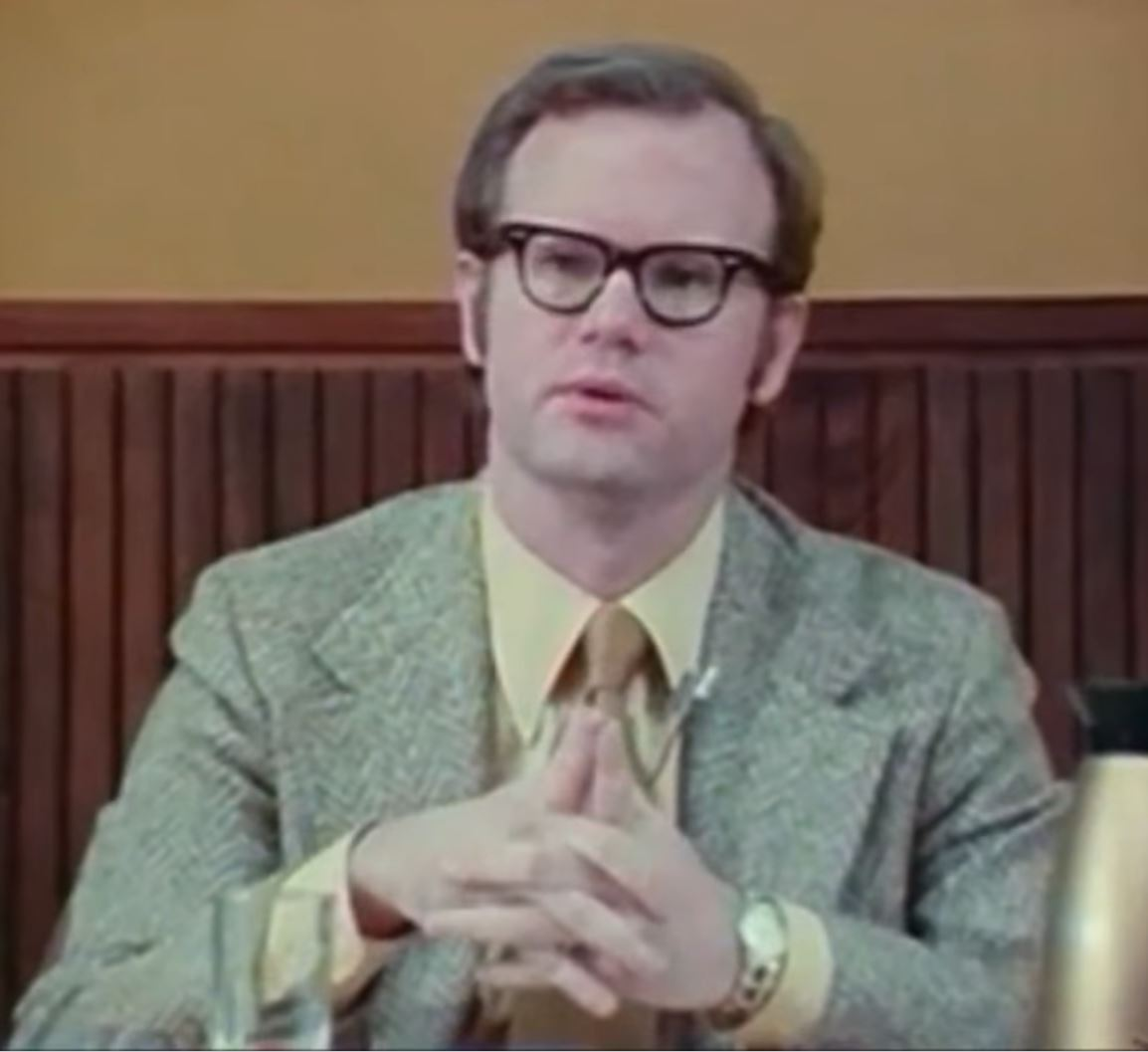
- Berendzen in 1972
- Born: Richard Earl Berendzen; September 6, 1938; Walters, Oklahoma, U.S.
- Died: November 3, 2022 (aged 84); Arlington, Virginia, U.S.
- Education: Massachusetts Institute of Technology; Harvard University
- Spouses: Barbara Edwards (div. 1960) Gail Edgar (m. 1964)
- Children: 2
- Scientific career
- Fields: Astronomy; education; physics
- Workplaces: Boston University; Harvard University; American University
- Doctoral advisor: William Liller

Richard Earl Berendzen (September 6, 1938 – November 3, 2022) was an American scientist, professor, and president of American University, specializing in astronomy. His resignation in 1990 came following formal charges of making indecent phone calls to households in the Fairfax area over the course of several weeks that year. In 1992, he returned to American University as a full-time physics professor until his retirement in 2006.

== Early life ==
Berendzen was born in Walters, Oklahoma on September 6, 1938. In 1942, he and his parents, Earl and June Berendzen, moved to Portland, Oregon, where Berendzen developed rheumatic fever and asthma at a young age, which confined him to his room.

In 1945, the family relocated to Dallas, Texas, where Earl managed a hardware store. Richard remained ill and bedridden for three more years, and began spending time stargazing on his lawn.

In 1946, Berendzen began attending school for the first time as a second grader. His mother's mental health began to deteriorate, and "she was wildly unpredictable. Labels like manic, paranoid, delusional, and psychotic came years later. Sometimes she would be furious for no apparent reason; then, in a snap, she could suddenly become incredibly loving, supportive, and fun.” Berendzen began experiencing sexual abuse in his home at this time.

== Education ==
Berendzen attended Southern Methodist University, where he pursued a physics degree. He transferred to MIT after his sophomore year and received a Bachelor of Science degree in 1961. He continued to Harvard as a graduate student, where he served as a teaching assistant for both William Liller and Carl Sagan. He graduated in 1967 with a master's degree and a joint PhD in astronomy and education.

== Career ==
Berendzen joined the physics and astronomy faculty at Boston University, and became the chair of the astronomy department in 1971. In 1974, he was hired as the dean of the college of arts and sciences at American University in Washington, D.C. American University appointed him as provost in 1976, and in 1980 he became the university's eleventh president.

During his 10-year tenure as president, Berendzen and his wife Gail averaged eleven Washington social functions every week, and the university's endowment tripled in size.

Berendzen secured a $5 million donation from Saudi businessman Adnan Khashoggi toward the Adnan Khashoggi Sports and Convocation Center, and named Kashoggi to the university's board of trustees. Khashoggi's donation, and the building's subsequent naming, elicited limited protests from some American University students and former faculty who were concerned about Khashoggi's role in the Iran-Contra affair. Khashoggi was removed from the board in 1989 after facing charges of racketeering, fraud and obstruction of justice pertaining to his dealings in the Philippines.

In addition to his responsibilities at American University, Berendzen chaired the commission on the Budget and Financial Priorities of the District of Columbia and the American Council on Education's Committee on Foreign Student Policy. He was also an original member of the Committee for the Scientific Investigation of Claims of the Paranormal.

Berendzen at the "Life Beyond Earth and the Mind of Man" panel, November 1972

He served on the board of the Planetary Society and the advisory board for the National Center for the Survivors of Child Abuse. He was a consultant to NASA, served on NASA's Exploration Advisory Task Force, and Selection Panel for the Teacher in Space Project, served as director of NASA's Space Grant Consortium for Washington, D.C., and testified about space and education before the United States Congress.

Under the auspices of the New York Academy of Sciences and the American Astronomical Society, Berendzen organized and chaired a major international conference, titled "Education in and History of Modern Astronomy." He organized and chaired two other key conferences: "Life Beyond Earth and the Mind of Man" (at Boston University) in 1973 and "Space 2000" (at American University) in 1999. Proceedings from the Boston University were included in Who's Out There?, a 1975 television program narrated by Orson Welles.

== Resignation from American University ==
In March 1990, daycare owner Susan Allen received a phone call from a man claiming to be a gynecologist and inquiring about her sexual habits. She reported the call to her husband, a Fairfax County law enforcement officer, and continued to engage with the caller for several weeks while police monitored the communication via call tracing and tape recordings. Allen described the calls as "filthy beyond your most horrible nightmares."

Police traced the calls to American University and Berendzen's private phone line. Among other things, Berendzen asked those he called whether they had sex with children, claimed he kept a 4-year-old sex slave in his basement, and made repeated references to child pornography and purchasing child sex slaves at auction. On April 7, the board of trustees confronted Berendzen, who resigned on April 8. He was admitted to Johns Hopkins, where he was treated with several therapies addressing his childhood abuse. On April 10, Berendzen issued a public statement citing "exhaustion" as the reason behind his decision to step down.

=== Aftermath ===
Berendzen was charged with two misdemeanor counts of making indecent calls. He pleaded guilty to both, and his jail time was suspended on the condition that he continue receiving psychiatric treatment for the next year. Once the case became public, more than two dozen other daycare providers in the Fairfax area reported to police that they had also received obscene calls.

In the summer of 1990, Allen filed an $11 million lawsuit against Berendzen and American University. The case was settled for an undisclosed sum.

In 1992, Berendzen returned to American University as a full-time physics professor, and served in that role until he retired in August 2006.

== Accomplishments ==
Berendzen received honorary doctorate degrees from Seton Hall University and the University of Columbo in 1985, and from the University of Maryland in 1990.

== Personal life ==
Berendzen met his first wife, Barbara Edwards, at Woodrow Wilson High School. Their first daughter, Deborah, was born during Berendzen's first year at SMU. In 1960, while Berendzen was at MIT, Barbara returned to Dallas with Deborah, and the couple divorced.

Berendzen married Gail Edgar, whom he met at Harvard, in 1964, and the couple had a daughter named Natasha.

Berendzen died of a respiratory ailment at his Arlington, Virginia, home on November 3, 2022. He was 84.

Preceded by Joseph J. Sisco	President, American University; 1980–1991	Succeeded by Joseph Duffey
