= Nancy Clark Reynolds =

American TV journalist (1927–2022)

- Born: Nancy Clark Reynolds; June 26, 1927; Ocatello, Idaho, U.S.
- Died: May 23, 2022 (aged 94); Santa Fe, N.M., U.S.
- Occupations: Television journalist, lobbyist, government official
- Spouses: Bill Wurzberger, Frank Reynolds
- Children: 4
- Parents: D. Worth Clark (father); Virgil Irwin Clark (mother)

Nancy Clark Reynolds (June 26, 1927 – May 23, 2022) was an American television journalist who went on to become a press secretary for Ronald Reagan and was a founder of the Washington, D.C. lobbying firm Wexler, Reynolds, Harrison & Schule.

== Early life ==
Reynolds was born in Pocatello, a small city in southeast Idaho. Her father, D. Worth Clark, was a lawyer who went on to become a U.S. Senator from Idaho and her mother, Virgil Irwin Clark, was a homemaker.

She studied at high school in Washington and later, English at Goucher College, in Maryland, graduating in 1945.

== Career ==
Reynolds worked as a reporter for a Baltimore TV station, WBAL. She worked as the host of a daytime talk show in Boise after divorcing Wurzberger. A few years later she moved to San Francisco, California, and eventually joined Governor Reagan's staff. She worked as an assistant press secretary and then as a special assistant for Reagan. In 1981, President Reagan named her the U.S. representative to the United Nations Commission on the Status of Women.

In 1985, Reynolds served as co-chair of the U.S. delegation to the U.N. Decade for Women World Conference in Nairobi.

She worked for the building materials company, Boise Cascade, as its head of government relations. Later, she held the same job for the manufacturer Bendix until 1983. She worked for six months in 1980 on Reagan's White House transition team. She started the lobbying firm along with Anne Wexler in 1983. Her partners at the lobbying group included, apart from Wexler, Robert Schule, a former Carter aide, and Gail Harrison, who had been Vice President Walter Mondale's chief domestic-policy adviser. The clients of the lobbying group included General Motors, American Airlines, and MCI Communications.

== Personal life ==
Reynolds married Bill Wurzberger and had three children with him. They were divorced in 1961. She later married and divorced Frank Reynolds, a journalist, Republican campaign aide, and lobbyist. Reynolds died on May 23, 2022, at her home in Santa Fe, New Mexico, at the age of 94, survived by her partner Bob Kemble.

== Events ==
She had spent time with the paleoanthropologist Richard Leakey in Africa. She had dated J. D. Salinger and Jack Valenti.
