= Midge Costanza =

American political advisor, social and political activist (1932–2010)

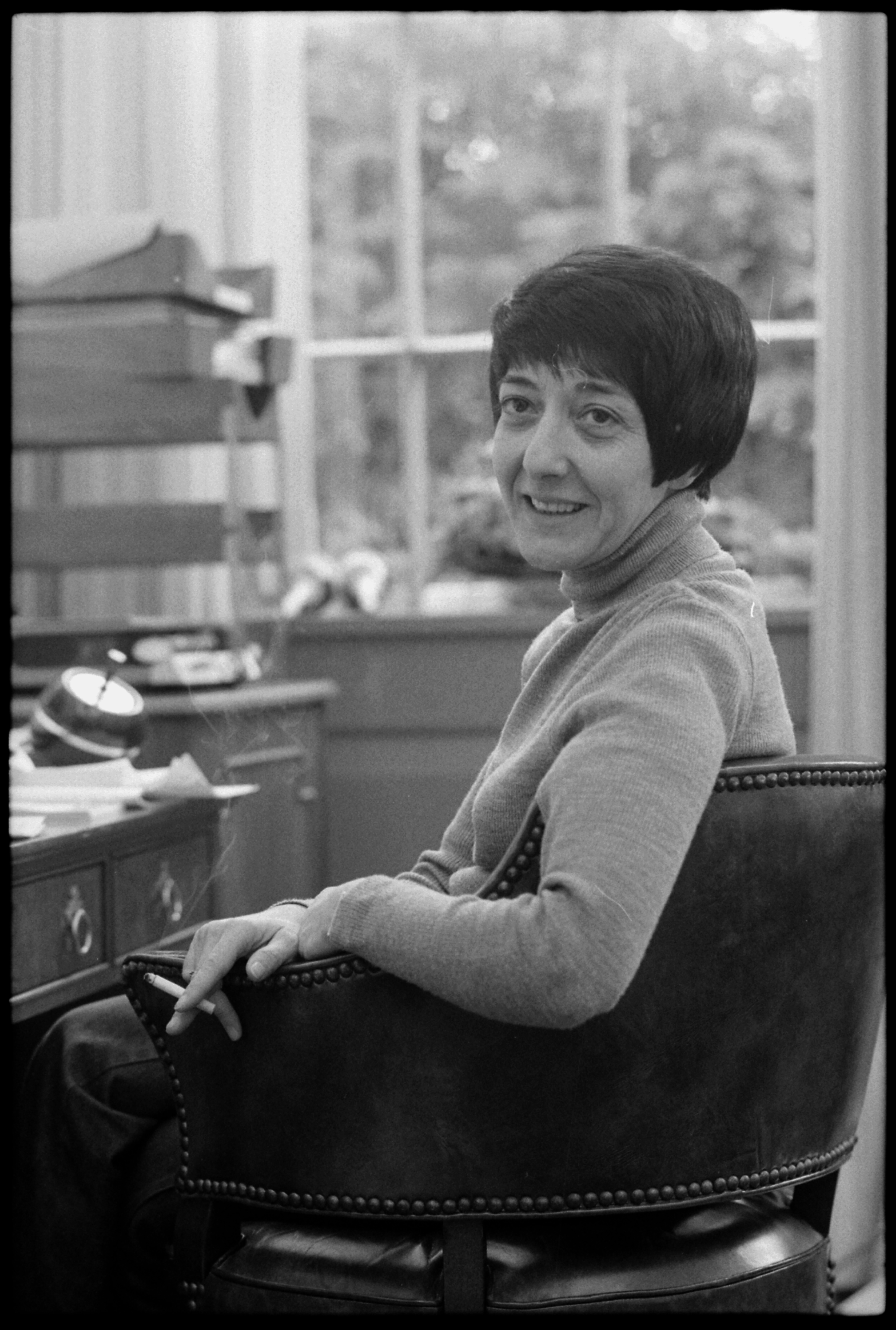
- Costanza in 1977

Director of the Office of Public Liaison
- In office January 20, 1977 – September 1, 1978
- President: Jimmy Carter
- Preceded by: William Baroody
- Succeeded by: Anne Wexler

Personal details
- Born: Margaret Costanza; November 28, 1932 LeRoy, New York, U.S.
- Died: March 23, 2010 (aged 77) San Diego, California, U.S.
- Party: Democratic
- Education: University of Colorado, Boulder (attended); University of California, Los Angeles (BA)

Margaret "Midge" Costanza (November 28, 1932 – March 23, 2010) was an American presidential advisor and a social and political activist. A lifelong champion of gay and women's rights, she was known for her wit, outspoken manner, and commitment to her convictions.

== Early life and family ==
Costanza was born to Philip Costanza and Concetta Granata Costanza on November 28, 1932, in LeRoy, New York, and was raised in Rochester. Her parents were Sicilian immigrant sausage-makers. Following various clerical jobs she took after high school, Costanza became an administrative assistant for a real estate developer in Rochester, using this job to become active in several community organizations.

== Political career ==
=== Activist, councilwoman, and vice-mayor of Rochester ===
Taking an interest in politics, Costanza volunteered on W. Averell Harriman's campaign for governor in 1954 and soon became the Monroe County, New York, executive director of Robert F. Kennedy's Senate campaign in 1964. She served as a Democratic National Committee member from 1972 until 1977.

In 1973 she ran for an at-large seat on the Rochester city council, becoming Rochester's first councilwoman in a landslide. The recipient of the largest votes traditionally was named mayor, however the council chose a man for the post, naming Costanza vice-mayor, a largely ceremonial position with little power.

=== Congressional aspirations ===
Costanza lost a race for the United States House of Representatives in 1974 to the popular Republican incumbent. In 1976 when Georgia Governor Jimmy Carter ran for President of the United States, Costanza served as co-chair of his New York campaign operation and gave a seconding speech for him at the Democratic National Convention (Carter had been a volunteer in Costanza's congressional campaign two years prior).

=== Woman in the White House ===
Upon Carter's election Costanza was named Assistant to the President for Public Liaison, moving into the office next door to the Oval Office. Costanza was nicknamed "the President's window to the nation", consulting with a wide array of groups. While in the White House she was a supporter of the Equal Rights Amendment. Costanza caused controversy when she invited fourteen National Gay Task Force leaders and gay rights activists to the White House at the height of Anita Bryant's homophobic "Save Our Children" campaign. Constanza did not disclose to some people that she was a lesbian nor dating Jean O'Leary at the time. The two activists organized this gay activist conference in the White House on March 26, 1977.

Costanza went on to arrange discussions between the NGTF co-directors and senior officials of the administration. Public disagreements with some of the president's policies caused controversy and saw Costanza's role in the White House diminished. As her successor Anne Wexler described it: "OPL under Costanza had functioned as an office providing responsiveness to interest groups, a form of White House case work, but had not taken enough initiative to enlist group support by building coalitions that would move the president’s program on Capitol Hill." Affirming her support for Carter, she resigned from his administration effective September 1, 1978.

Costanza had been popular with women's groups, and had earned herself a Newsweek cover titled "Woman in the White House". Following her resignation many feminists were angered with Carter, feeling he had "fired" Costanza, on whom much pressure was put to quit.

== Career and activism after the White House ==
Costanza became executive director of her friend Shirley MacLaine's "Higher Self" seminars after moving to Los Angeles and later became vice-president at Alan Landsburg Productions, where she made commercial films and advertisements. She served on many service group boards of directors, including the AIDS research organization Search Alliance and the National Gay Rights Advocates.

Moving to San Diego County, California, in 1990, Costanza coached candidates for office in public speaking, serving as the coordinator for Barbara Boxer's winning United States Senate in the Year of the Woman, 1992, and as manager for Kathleen Brown's failed gubernatorial candidacy in 1994. Governor of California Gray Davis appointed Costanza as a liaison for women's groups and issues. Costanza lost that job when Gray Davis lost a recall reelection in November 2003.

Costanza became a professor at San Diego State University in 2004 and was working with the Political Science and Women's Studies departments of San Diego State and the Political Science department of the University of California, San Diego to develop the Midge Costanza Institute. The institute is mainly aimed at inspiring young people to become active in political and social causes.

== Honor ==
Midge Costanza was nominated and inducted into the San Diego County Women's Hall of Fame in 2011 by Women's Museum of California, Commission on the Status of Women, University of California, San Diego Women's Center, and San Diego State University Women's Studies.

== Death ==
Costanza died of cancer at Scripps Mercy Hospital in San Diego, California, on March 23, 2010, at the age of 77. She is survived by her brother Anthony.

Midge Costanza was nominated and inducted into the San Diego County Women's Hall of Fame in 2011 for the title of Trailblazer, meaning, women who have paved the way for other women, or were the first in their field. The annual Women's Hall of Fame induction is co-hosted by Women's Museum of California (Located in San Diego), Commission on the Status of Women, UC San Diego Women's Center, and San Diego State Women's Studies.

== In popular culture ==
In the 2020 television mini-series Mrs. America she is portrayed by Annie Parisse.

Political offices
Preceded by William Baroody	Director of the Office of Public Liaison; 1977–1978	Succeeded by Anne Wexler
