= 1958 United States Senate election in Connecticut =

- November 4, 1958
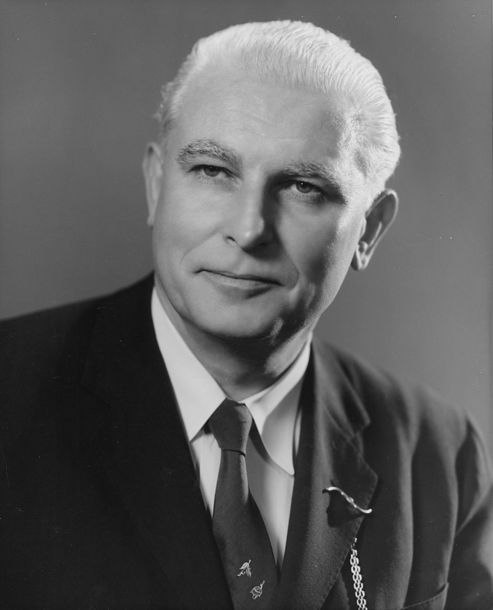

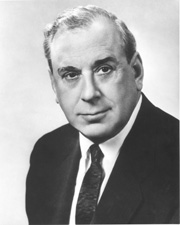
Nominee	Thomas J. Dodd	William A. Purtell
Party	Democratic	Republican
Popular vote	554,841	410,622
Percentage	57.29%	42.40%
- Dodd: 50–60% 60–70% 70–80% Purtell: 50–60% 60–70% 70–80% Tie: 50%
U.S. senator before election
William A. Purtell
Republican
Elected U.S. Senator
Thomas J. Dodd
Democratic

The United States Senate election of 1958 in Connecticut was held on November 4, 1958. Democratic Thomas J. Dodd defeated incumbent senator William A. Purtell who ran for a second term.

Purtell was one of ten Republican senators to be defeated in the 1958 elections, part of a record swing of 15 seats gained by the Democratic party that year. Dodd would go on to serve two terms in the Senate.

== General election ==
=== Candidates ===
- Thomas J. Dodd, U.S. Representative from Old Lyme (Democratic)
- Vivien Kellems, industrialist, inventor, and tax protester (Independent)
- William A. Purtell, incumbent Senator since 1953 (Republican)

=== Results ===
United States Senate election in Connecticut, 1958
Party	Candidate	Votes	%
Democratic	Thomas J. Dodd	554,841	57.29%
Republican	William A. Purtell (incumbent)	410,622	42.40%
Independent	Vivien Kellems	3,043	0.31%
Total votes		968,506	100.00%
Democratic gain from Republican			

== See also ==
- 1958 United States Senate elections
