= Cornelius M. Kerwin =

14th President of American University

Neil Kerwin

14th President of American University
- In office August 24, 2005 – May 31, 2017; Acting: August 24, 2005 – September 1, 2007
- Preceded by: Benjamin Ladner
- Succeeded by: Sylvia Mathews Burwell

Personal details
- Born: April 10, 1949 (age 77) Waterbury, Connecticut, U.S.
- Education: American University (BA); University of Rhode Island (MA); Johns Hopkins University (PhD)

Cornelius Martin "Neil" Kerwin (born April 10, 1949) is an American academic in public administration and former president of American University.

A 1971 undergraduate alumnus of American University, Kerwin continued his education with a Master of Arts degree in political science from the University of Rhode Island in 1973. In 1975, Kerwin returned to his alma mater and joined the faculty of the American University School of Public Affairs, then the School of Government and Public Administration. Kerwin completed his doctorate in political science from Johns Hopkins University in 1978 and continued to teach until 1989, when he became the dean of the school. In 1996, Kerwin was elected as a fellow of the National Academy of Public Administration.

He continued in that post until 1997, when he was named American University's provost. During his tenure as provost, Kerwin oversaw a number of major changes including the tightening of graduate and doctoral programs, the foundation of the University College Program, and comprehensive reviews and overhauls of the General Education Program, University Honors Program and academic advising. Kerwin put his understanding of policy implementation to use in executing segments of then-University president Benjamin Ladner's 15-Point Plan, including the establishment of a new faculty senate.

Following the American University Board of Trustees' decision to suspend Ladner on August 25, 2005, Kerwin was named Acting President. He held that post through the Board's investigation and subsequent removal of Ladner. He was named to permanently replace Ladner on July 20, 2007. Kerwin is the first American University alumnus to serve as its University President.

Kerwin's academic work focuses on public policy, administrative and regulatory processes and implementation and American government. He is the author of Rulemaking: How Government Agencies Write Law and Make Policy and coauthor of How Washington Works: The Executive's Guide to Government.

In the Chronicle of Higher Education survey of college presidents' salaries for 2007–08, he was fifth in the nation with a compensation of $1.4 million as a result of his 20-year signing bonus.

AU President Neil Kerwin said on March 28, 2016, that he would step down as president when his contract expired in May 2017.

Educational offices
Preceded by Benjamin Ladner	President, American University; 2005 – 2017	Succeeded by Sylvia Burwell
