= 1964 United States Senate election in Connecticut =

- November 3, 1964
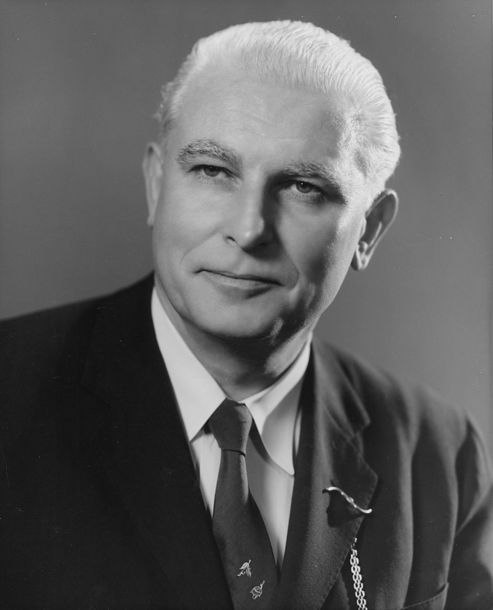

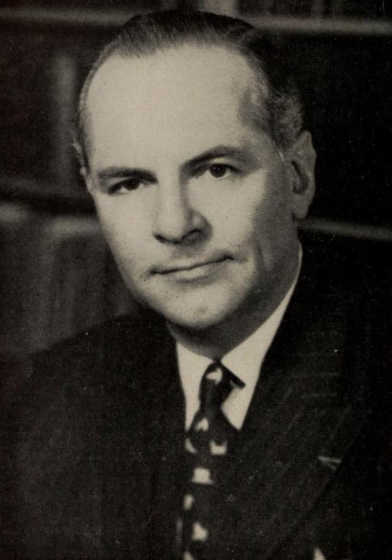
Nominee	Thomas J. Dodd	John Davis Lodge
Party	Democratic	Republican
Popular vote	781,008	426,939
Percentage	64.66%	35.34%
- Dodd: 50–60% 60–70% 70–80% 80–90% Lodge: 50–60% 60–70%
U.S. senator before election
Thomas J. Dodd
Democratic
Elected U.S. Senator
Thomas J. Dodd
Democratic

The United States Senate election of 1964 in Connecticut was held on November 3, 1964. Democratic Thomas J. Dodd was re-elected and served a second term. John Davis Lodge, grandson of Henry Cabot Lodge was defeated by almost 30%.

== Results ==
United States Senate election in Connecticut, 1964
Party	Candidate	Votes	%	±%
Democratic	Thomas J. Dodd (incumbent)	781,008	64.66%	
Republican	John Davis Lodge	426,939	35.34%	
Majority		354,069	29.32%	
Turnout		1,207,947		
Democratic hold				
