= Joseph Duffey =

American diplomat and academic (1932–2021)

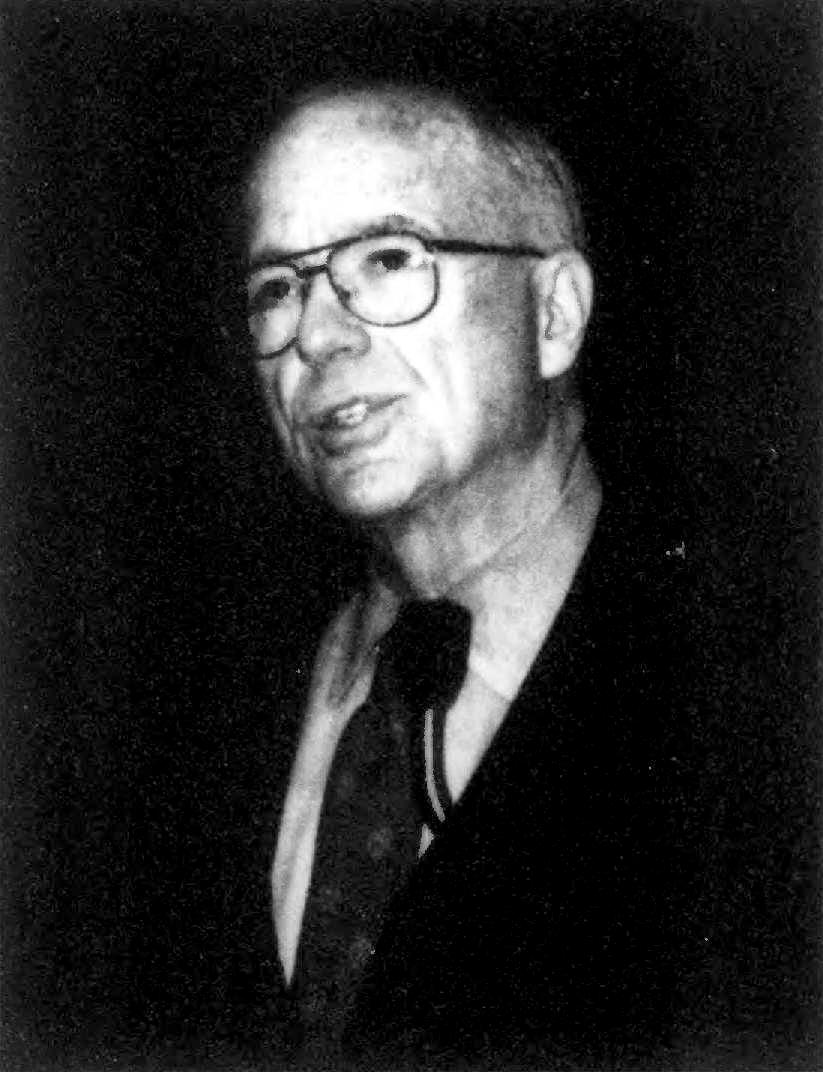
- Duffey c. 1997

14th Director of the United States Information Agency
- In office 1993–1999
- President: Bill Clinton
- Succeeded by: Position abolished

12th President of American University
- In office 1991–1994
- Preceded by: Richard E. Berendzen
- Succeeded by: Benjamin Ladner

President of the University of Massachusetts
- In office 1990–1991
- Preceded by: Loren Baritz (interim)
- Succeeded by: Richard D. O'Brien

Chancellor of the University of Massachusetts Amherst
- In office 1982–1991

Chair of the National Endowment for the Humanities
- In office 1977–1981
- President: Jimmy Carter; Ronald Reagan
- Preceded by: Robert Kingston (acting)
- Succeeded by: William Bennett

7th Assistant Secretary of State for Educational and Cultural Affairs
- In office April 8, 1977 – March 21, 1978
- President: Jimmy Carter
- Preceded by: John Richardson Jr.
- Succeeded by: Alice Stone Ilchman

Personal details
- Born: Joseph Daniel Duffey; July 1, 1932 Huntington, West Virginia, U.S.
- Died: February 25, 2021 (aged 88) Washington, D.C., U.S.
- Spouses: Patricia Fortney (m. 1952, divorced) Anne Wexler (m. 1974; died 2009)
- Education: Marshall University (BA); Andover Theological School (BDiv); Yale University (MTh); Hartford Seminary (PhD)

Joseph Daniel Duffey (July 1, 1932 – February 25, 2021) was an American academic, educator, anti-war activist and political appointee. He was the Democratic Party's candidate in the 1970 U.S. Senate election in Connecticut, losing to Republican Lowell Weicker. He later served as the Assistant Secretary of State for Educational and Cultural Affairs; the chairman of the National Endowment for the Humanities; the director of the U.S. Information Agency; and the president or chancellor of the University of Massachusetts Amherst, the University of Massachusetts system and American University.

== Early life and education ==
Duffey was born in Huntington, West Virginia, on July 1, 1932. His father initially worked as a coal miner, but became a barber after losing a leg in an accident. His mother died when he was thirteen. Duffey was the first person in his family to study past grade four. He obtained a bachelor's degree from Marshall University in 1954. He went on to earn a B.D. from Andover Theological School (now part of Yale Divinity School) in 1957, an S.T.M. from Yale University in 1963 and a Ph.D. from Hartford Seminary Foundation in 1969.

== Career ==
From 1960 to 1970, Duffey was an assistant professor and then acting dean and associate professor at Hartford Seminary. He was also founder and director of the Center for Urban Studies there.

=== 1970 election ===
Duffey ran for the U.S. Senate in 1970 as a prominent anti-Vietnam War candidate; he had just turned 35 years old. The campaign became notable because several of Duffey's young supporters went on to prominent careers in Democratic politics, including future president Bill Clinton, a Yale Law School student at the time.

The incumbent in that race, Thomas J. Dodd, was the father of future Connecticut Senator Christopher Dodd. Dodd, who had been censured by the Senate for corruption, was not re-nominated by the Democratic Party. Instead, Duffey joined Stamford businessman Alphonsus J. (Al) Donahue, State Senate President Edward Marcus, and former congressman Donald J. Irwin in a race to win the party endorsement. Donahue won the Democratic convention, but Duffey went on to win the primary. He finished second in a three-way general election race to Lowell Weicker, with Senator Dodd running as an independent. Some of these events were captured in a documentary, Dissent of the Governed.

Anne Wexler ran Duffey's 1970 campaign. They subsequently married in September 1974, after they had both divorced their respective spouses.

=== Academics ===
Duffey was a fellow at Harvard University's John F. Kennedy School of Government in 1971. He went on to serve as an adjunct professor at Yale University and a fellow at Calhoun College from 1971 to 1973. During this time, he worked for the George McGovern 1972 presidential campaign. From 1974 to 1976, he acted as the chief administrative officer and spokesman for the American Association of University Professors. He worked on the Carter–Mondale transition team between 1976 and 1977, and was Assistant Secretary of State for Educational and Cultural Affairs in 1977 and 1978. Duffey was unsatisfied in the latter role, and was reportedly unenthusiastic about being nominated to the National Endowment for the Humanities.

Duffey was appointed chairman of the NEH in August 1977, after an impasse that lasted for half a year. In his capacity as chairman Duffey was central to obtaining NEH funding that established the Library of America.

He served as chairman of NEH until 1982, when he became chancellor of the University of Massachusetts Amherst. During his tenure the university welcomed Robert Mugabe, granting him an honorary law degree ceremony in 1986 during which Duffey described Mugable as "an outspoken and effective leader in his country's sturggle for independence...laying the foundation for vibrant economy and interracial harmony". On June 12, 2008, the University of Massachusetts Board of Trustees revoked the honorary degree it had granted 22 years before based on Mugabe's history of human rights violations. Subsequently, the position of president of the entire University of Massachusetts system was added to Duffey's responsibilities in 1990. One year later, he acted as joint head of the American delegation of election observers in Ethiopia. He was named as president of American University in 1991 and served for two years.

Duffey became the final director of the United States Information Agency in 1993. He held the position until June 30, 1999, shortly before USIA was incorporated into the State Department on October 1 of that year. He subsequently joined Laureate Education as senior vice president in 1999. There, he was responsible for education and academic quality and coordinated the development of Laureate International Universities network programs and partnerships worldwide.

== Honors ==
Duffey was conferred 14 honorary degrees from American colleges and universities. He was named Commander of the Order of the Crown by the King of Belgium in 1980. Thirteen years later, he was granted an honorary Doctor of Letters by Ritsumeikan University in Japan. He was a member of the Council on Foreign Relations from 1979 until his death.

== Personal life ==
Duffey married his first wife, Patricia Fortney, in 1952, when he was 19 years old. They had met at a Baptist church youth convention. Together, they had two children: David (who predeceased him in 2019) and Michael. They divorced after the Senate election in 1970. His second wife, Anne Wexler (1930–2009), was a political advisor and lobbyist. She also had two sons from her previous marriage. She died of cancer on August 7, 2009, at age 79.

Duffey died on February 25, 2021, at a retirement community in Washington, D.C. He was 88, and was ill in the time leading up to his death.

== Selected works ==
- Remarks on the Humanities (1977)
- "The American Century and Its Discontents, Chapter Four of "At the End of the American Century (1998) ISBN 9780801859168
- Foreword, The Pakistan Cauldron by James P. Farwell (2011) ISBN 9781597979832

Party political offices
Preceded by Thomas J. Dodd	Democratic Party nominee for United States Senator from Connecticut (Class 1); 1970	Succeeded by Gloria Schaffer
Government offices
Preceded by John Richardson, Jr.	Assistant Secretary of State for Educational and Cultural Affairs; April 8, 1977 – March 21, 1978	Succeeded by Alice Stone Ilchman
Preceded by Ronald Berman	Chairperson of the National Endowment for the Humanities; 1977–1981	Succeeded by William Bennett
Academic offices
Preceded by Richard E. Berendzen	President, American University; 1991–1994	Succeeded by Benjamin Ladner
