= 1988 United States Senate election in Connecticut =

- November 8, 1988
- Turnout: 81.4% ▲
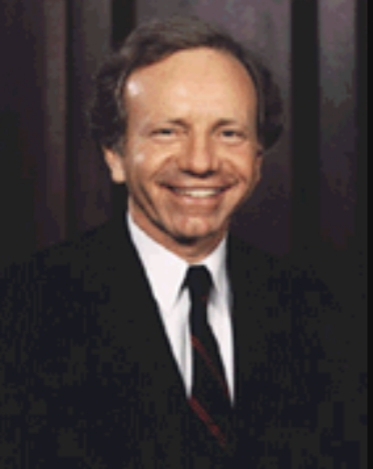

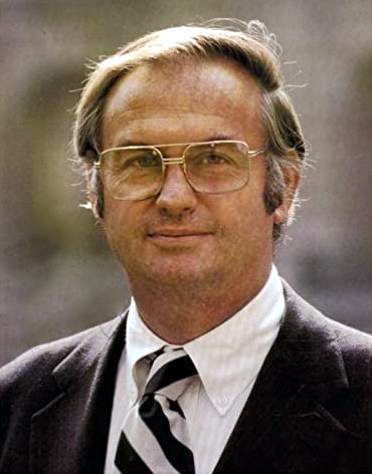
Nominee	Joe Lieberman	Lowell Weicker
Party	Democratic	Republican
Popular vote	688,499	678,454
Percentage	49.76%	49.04%
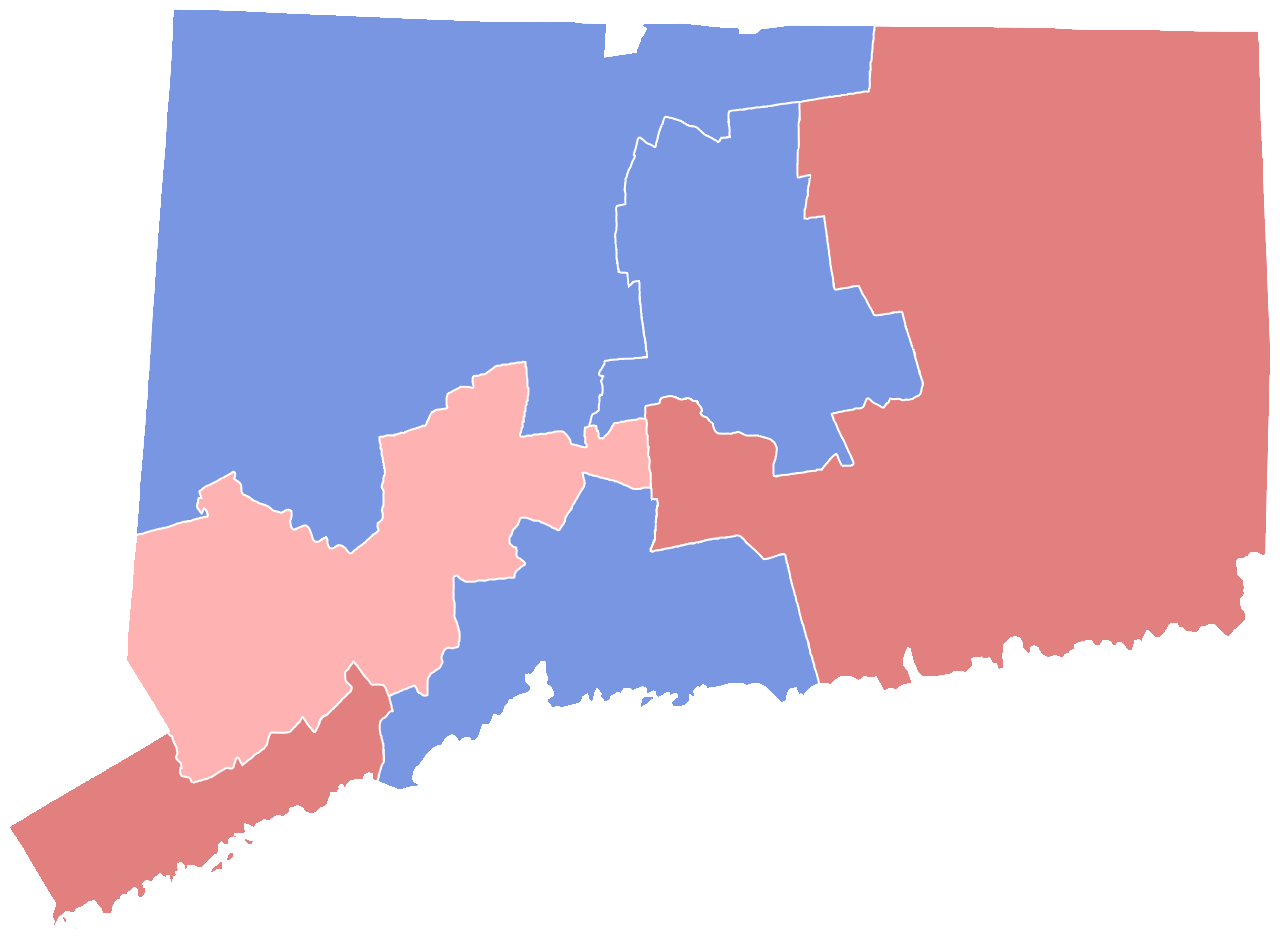
- Lieberman: 40–50% 50–60% 60–70% Weicker: 40–50% 50–60% 60–70% Tie: 40–50%
U.S. senator before election
Lowell Weicker
Republican
Elected U.S. Senator
Joe Lieberman
Democratic

The 1988 United States Senate election in Connecticut took place on November 8, 1988. Incumbent Republican U.S. Senator Lowell Weicker ran for re-election to a fourth term but was narrowly defeated by Democrat Joe Lieberman, the Connecticut Attorney General and eventual 2000 nominee for Vice President of the United States, who would remain in office until 2013. This is the last time a Connecticut Senator lost re-election.

Both Weicker and Lieberman would go on to win state-wide elections as independents respectively in 1990 for governor and in 2006 for Senate. Lieberman's swearing-in marked the first time since 1971 that Democrats held both Senate seats from Connecticut. Lieberman was at times considered to the right of Weicker, with him benefiting from the support of National Review founder William F. Buckley Jr., and his brother, former U.S. Senator from New York James L. Buckley, with William Buckley running columns in support of Lieberman.

== General election ==
=== Candidates ===
- Joe Lieberman (D), Connecticut Attorney General
- Lowell P. Weicker Jr. (R), incumbent U.S. Senator since 1971
- Howard A. Grayson Jr. (L)
- Melissa M. Fisher (NAP)

=== Debates ===
Dates	Lieberman	Weicker	Link
October 22, 1988	Participant	Participant	C-SPAN

=== Polling ===
Poll source	Date(s) administered	Sample size	Margin of error	Lowell Weicker (R)	Joe Lieberman (D)	Undecided
University of Connecticut	November 1 - 3, 1988	515 (LV)	± 5%	42%	36%	22%
University of Connecticut	October 23 - 30, 1988	1,000 (LV)	± 3.5%	38%	37%	25%
Hartford Courant	October, 1988	512 (V)	–	39%	39%	22%
Quinnipiac University	September 27 – October 5, 1988	742 (RV)	–	41.4%	26.9%	–
University of Connecticut	September 12 – 18, 1988	512 (RV)	± 5%	44%	30%	27%
University of Connecticut	July 11 – 18, 1988	508 (RV)	± 5%	47%	31%	–
Hartford Courant	April, 1988	500 (RV)	–	51%	27%	22%

=== Fundraising ===
Campaign finance reports as of December 31, 1988
Candidate	Raised	Spent	Cash on hand
Joe Lieberman (D)	$2,650,603	$2,570,779	$79,824
Lowell Weicker (R)	$2,781,538	$2,681,294	$52,517
Source: Federal Election Commission

=== Results ===
General election results
Party	Candidate	Votes	%
Democratic	Joe Lieberman	688,499	49.76%
Republican	Lowell Weicker (incumbent)	678,454	49.04%
Libertarian	Howard A. Grayson Jr.	12,409	0.90%
New Alliance	Melissa M. Fisher	4,154	0.30%
Total votes		1,383,516	100.00%
Democratic gain from Republican			

==== By congressional district ====
Weicker and Lieberman won 3 of 6 congressional districts, respectively. Lieberman won one held by a Republican, while Weicker won one held by a Democrat.

District	Joe Lieberman Democratic		Lowell Weicker Republican		Others		Total votes cast	Representative
District	#	%	#	%	#	%	Total votes cast	Representative
1st	122,631	52.05%	110,646	46.97%	2,290	0.98%	235,567	Barbara B. Kennelly
2nd	110,238	48.03%	116,207	50.64%	3,032	1.33%	229,477	Sam Gejdenson
3rd	123,634	53.95%	102,954	44.93%	2,571	1.12%	229,159	Bruce Morrison
4th	94,982	44.55%	115,244	54.06%	2,964	1.39%	213,190	Chris Shays
5th	113,984	49.16%	114,878	49.54%	3,001	1.30%	231,863	John G. Rowland
6th	123,030	50.37%	118,525	48.52%	2,705	1.11%	244,260	Nancy Johnson
Totals	688,499	49.76%	678,454	49.04%	16,563	1.20%	1,383,516	

== See also ==
- 1988 United States Senate elections
