= Lowell Weicker =

American politician (1931–2023)

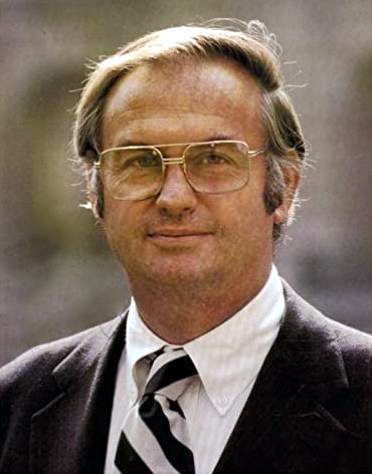

85th Governor of Connecticut
- In office January 9, 1991 – January 4, 1995
- Lieutenant: Eunice Groark
- Preceded by: William O'Neill
- Succeeded by: John Rowland

United States Senator from Connecticut
- In office January 3, 1971 – January 3, 1989
- Preceded by: Thomas J. Dodd
- Succeeded by: Joe Lieberman

Member of the U.S. House of Representatives from Connecticut's 4th district
- In office January 3, 1969 – January 3, 1971
- Preceded by: Donald J. Irwin
- Succeeded by: Stewart McKinney

Member of the Connecticut House of Representatives
- In office January 9, 1963 – January 3, 1969
- Preceded by: Nelson I. Beers
- Succeeded by: Robert D. Rogers
- Constituency: Greenwich (1963-1967); 154th district (1967-1969)

First Selectman of Greenwich
- In office 1964–1968
- Preceded by: Griffith Harris
- Succeeded by: John Taintor

Personal details
- Born: Lowell Palmer Weicker Jr. May 16, 1931 Paris, France
- Died: June 28, 2023 (aged 92) Middletown, Connecticut, U.S.
- Party: Republican (before 1990); A Connecticut Party (1990–1995); Independent (from 1995)
- Spouses: Marie-Louise Godfrey (m. 1953; div. 1977); Camille DiLorenzo Butler (m. 1977; div. 1984); Claudia Testa Ingram (m. 1984)
- Children: 5
- Education: Yale University (BA); University of Virginia (JD)
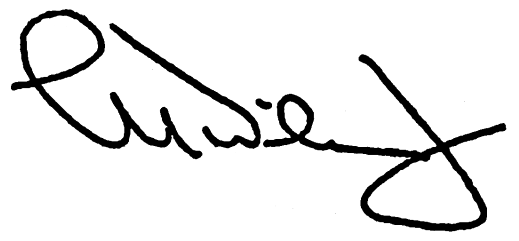
- Signature

Military service
- Allegiance: United States
- Branch/service: United States Army
- Years of service: 1953–1955 (active); 1959–1964 (reserve)
- Rank: First lieutenant
- Battles/wars: Korean War

Lowell Palmer Weicker Jr. (/waɪkər/; May 16, 1931 – June 28, 2023) was an American politician who served as a member of the United States House of Representatives representing Connecticut's 4th congressional district from 1969 to 1971, a member of the United States Senate from 1971 to 1989, and the 85th governor of Connecticut from 1991 to 1995.

Weicker unsuccessfully sought the Republican nomination for president in 1980. One of the first Republican members of Congress to express concerns about President Richard Nixon's role in the Watergate scandal, Weicker developed a reputation as a "Rockefeller Republican", eventually leading conservative activists to endorse his opponent Joe Lieberman, a New Democrat, in the 1988 Senate election which he subsequently lost.

Weicker later left the Republican Party, and became one of the few third-party candidates to be elected to a state governorship in the United States at the time, doing so on the ticket of A Connecticut Party in the 1990 Connecticut Gubernatorial Election.

== Early life ==
Weicker was born in Paris, the son of American parents Mary Hastings (née Bickford) and Lowell Palmer Weicker. His paternal grandfather Theodore Weicker was a German immigrant who co-founded the E. R. Squibb corporation. Weicker graduated from the Lawrenceville School (class of 1949), Yale University (1953), and the University of Virginia School of Law (1958). He began his political career after serving in the United States Army between 1953 and 1955, reaching the rank of first lieutenant.

== Career in Congress ==
Weicker served in the Connecticut State House of Representatives from 1963 to 1969 and as First Selectman of Greenwich, Connecticut, before winning election to the U.S. House of Representatives, in 1968 as a Republican. Weicker only served one term in the House before being elected to the U.S. Senate in 1970. Weicker benefited from a split in the Democratic Party in that election: two-term incumbent Thomas Dodd ran as an independent after losing the Democratic nomination to Joseph Duffey. Ultimately, Weicker won with 41.7 percent of the vote. Dodd finished third, with 266,500 votes—far exceeding Weicker's 86,600-vote margin over Duffey.

Weicker served in the U.S. Senate for three terms, from 1971 to 1989. He gained national attention for his service on the Senate Watergate Committee, where he became the first Republican senator to call for Richard Nixon's resignation. He recalled: "People in Connecticut were very much behind President Nixon, like the rest of the country. They thought he could do no wrong, and when I was in Connecticut, I would get flipped the bird all the time, whether it was on the streets or in the car, for the role that I was playing. After Watergate was over, then the needle goes all the way the other way, and I've got huge favorability ratings." Proving this, Weicker was convincingly reelected in 1976.

In 1980, he made an unsuccessful bid for the Republican nomination for president.

Weicker (along with Edward Brooke and Arlen Specter) was a liberal voice in an increasingly right-leaning Republican Party. For instance Americans for Democratic Action consistently rated Weicker as having a liberal quotient of 60 to 90% throughout his Senate career, and in 1987 and in 1988 gave him a higher rating than Connecticut's other senator, Democrat Chris Dodd. He was critical of the increasing influence of the Christian right on the party; he described the separation of church and state as "this country's greatest contribution to world civilization", and the party in 2012 as "swung off so far to the right that no moderate could've survived a primary." Weicker voted in favor of the bill establishing Martin Luther King Jr. Day as a federal holiday and the Civil Rights Restoration Act of 1987 (as well as to override President Ronald Reagan's veto). Weicker voted against the nomination of William Rehnquist as Chief Justice of the United States, as well as the nomination of Robert Bork to the U.S. Supreme Court.

Weicker was a strong advocate for the rights of the disabled during his tenure in Congress, although he ultimately lost his seat before the Americans with Disabilities Act of 1990 passed. In later interviews, Weicker identified his work on the Americans with Disabilities Act, funding the National Oceanic and Atmospheric Administration, increasing the funding for the National Institutes of Health, and funding research into AZT as his proudest achievements in the Senate.

Weicker's rocky relations with establishment Republicans may have roots in receiving strong support from Nixon in his 1970 Senate bid, support repaid in the eyes of his critics by a vehement attack on the White House while serving on the Watergate Committee. Later, his relations with the Bush family also soured, and Prescott Bush (the brother of the then Vice President) made a short-lived bid against Weicker to gain the 1982 Republican Senate nomination. Weicker's well-known Democratic sympathies increasingly alienated mainstream Republicans, particularly after Weicker’s effort to prevent the nomination of conservatives to state office, which resulted in a poor showing during the 1986 local elections, and he was defeated in the 1988 Senate election by Joe Lieberman. Lieberman benefited from the support of National Review founder William F. Buckley Jr., and his brother, former U.S. Senate member of New York James L. Buckley; William F. Buckley ran columns in support of Lieberman and circulated bumper stickers with the slogan, "Does Lowell Weicker Make You Sick?"

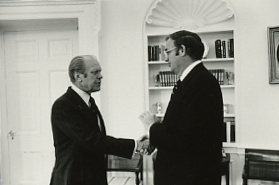
Weicker greeting Gerald Ford in 1976

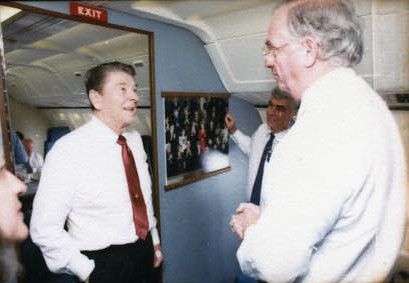
Weicker with Ronald Reagan in 1988

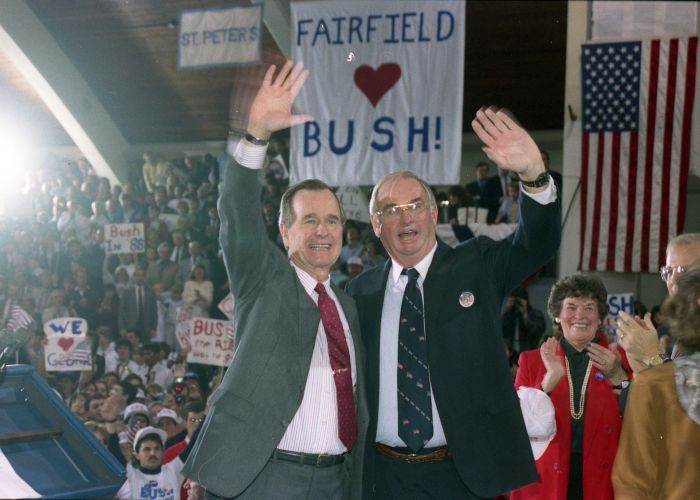
Weicker campaigning with George H. W. Bush in 1988

== Governor of Connecticut ==
Weicker's political career appeared to be over after his 1988 defeat, and he became a professor at the George Washington University Law School. However, he entered the 1990 gubernatorial election as the candidate of A Connecticut Party, running as a good government candidate and drew upon his coalition of liberal Republicans, moderate Democrats, and independent voters. The early 1990s recession had hit Connecticut hard, worsened by the fall in revenues from traditional sources such as sales tax and corporation tax. Connecticut politics had a tradition at the time of opposition to a state income tax—one had been implemented in 1971 but rescinded after six weeks under public pressure. Weicker initially campaigned on a platform of solving Connecticut's fiscal crisis without implementing an income tax. He won in a three-way race with Republican John G. Rowland and Democrat Bruce Morrison, taking 40% of the vote against Rowland's 37% and Morrison's 21%. Weicker lost Fairfield and New Haven County counties to Rowland, but won eastern Connecticut, drawing especially strong support from the Hartford metro area, where he had been strongly endorsed by the Hartford Courant and by many state employee labor unions. The Los Angeles Times wrote that support from Democrats was credited for Weicker's victory, reflected in Morrison's third-place finish.

After taking office, with a projected $2.4 billion deficit, Weicker reversed himself and pushed for the adoption of an income tax, a move that was very unpopular. He stated, "My policy when I came in was no income tax, but that fell apart on the rocks of fiscal fact." Weicker vetoed three budgets that did not contain an income tax, and forced a partial government shutdown, before the General Assembly narrowly passed it in 1991. The 1991 budget set the income tax rate at 6%, lowered the sales tax from 8% to 6% while expanding its base, reduced the corporate tax to 10.5% over two years, and eliminated taxes on capital gains, interest, and dividends. It also included $1.2 billion in line-by-line budget cuts, including the elimination of state aid to private and parochial schools, but held the line on social programs. His drastic measures provoked controversy. A huge protest rally in Hartford attracted some 40,000 participants, some of whom cursed at and spat at Governor Weicker.

Weicker earned lasting criticism for his implementation of the income tax; the conservative Yankee Institute claimed in August 2006 that after fifteen years the income tax had failed to achieve its stated goals. However, he earned national attention for his leadership on the issue, receiving the John F. Kennedy Library Foundation's Profile in Courage Award for taking an unpopular stand, then holding firm. Within two years, the state's budget was in surplus and he was well-regarded among voters. In retirement, he commented, "You've had 19 years to repeal it, and all you've done is spend it."

Despite his increasing popularity, he announced on September 30, 1993 that he was not seeking re-election as governor in 1994, citing wanting to spend time with his children as the reason. His last year in office was marked by a controversy over the firing of the state commissioner of motor vehicles, Louis Goldberg. In 2000, he endorsed Senator Bill Bradley (D-NJ) for President. In 2004, Weicker supported former Vermont Gov. Howard Dean's (D-VT) presidential bid. He expressed sympathy for the budget struggles of Governor Dannel Malloy, drawing a parallel with his own efforts to remedy a fiscal crisis.

In his book Independent Nation (2004), political analyst John Avlon describes Weicker as a radical centrist governor and thinker.

== Later career ==
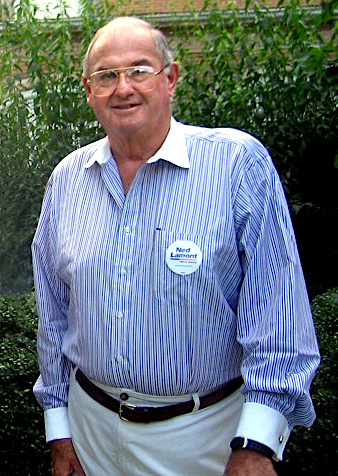
Weicker at a 2006 event for Ned Lamont in Greenwich, Connecticut

Weicker published a memoir entitled Maverick in 1995, co-written with Barry Sussman. The following year, he joined the board of directors for Compuware. In 1999, he became a member of the board of directors for the World Wrestling Federation (now known as WWE), and held this position until 2011. Despite the long professional relationship, Weicker did not support former WWE CEO Linda McMahon in either of her unsuccessful bids for the U.S. Senate in 2010 or 2012.

Weicker served from 2001 to 2011 as president of the board of directors of Trust for America's Health, a Washington, DC–based non-profit, non-partisan health policy research organization and was formerly a member of the board of directors of United States Tobacco. From 2003 on Weicker served on the board of Medallion Financial Corp., a lender to purchasers of taxi medallions in leading cities across the U.S. He was named to the board through his personal and business relationship with Andrew M. Murstein, president of Medallion.

Weicker considered a rematch against Senator Joe Lieberman in 2006. He objected to Lieberman's support for the Iraq War and told The New York Times in 2005, "If he's out there scot-free and nobody will do it [run against Senator Lieberman], I'd have to give serious thought to doing it myself, and I don't want to do it." Weicker ultimately did not run, but he endorsed Ned Lamont, who defeated Lieberman in the Democratic primary, causing Lieberman to run as an independent. The Lieberman campaign released an ad that borrowed from one aired during the 1988 Senate race, which depicted Weicker as a hibernating bear ignoring his Senate duties except at election time. In the 2006 ad, Weicker reappeared as a wounded bear while Lieberman's Democratic challenger, Lamont, was depicted as a bear cub sent and directed by Weicker. Lieberman ultimately defeated Lamont in November.

In 2015, despite criticizing Cuba for its lack of "human rights and democratic elections", Weicker described the country's free healthcare system as one of its most positive aspects.

During the 2016 Republican primaries, Weicker wrote an editorial in the Hartford Courant in which he criticized the repudiation of Rockefeller Republicans, the party's alienation of various population groups, and its obstructionist stance in Congress. He stated that the selection of Donald Trump as their presidential candidate "will complete their slow and steady descent into irrelevance."

In 2020, he filed an amicus brief on the side of Pennsylvania in the notable election case Texas v. Pennsylvania. Pennsylvania won the case and Biden was sworn in shortly after. Weicker had served with Biden in the U.S. Senate for 16 years.

== Personal life and death ==
Weicker lived in Old Lyme, Connecticut, in his later years. He was married three times and had five sons. His first marriage, to Marie Louise Godfrey, lasted from 1953 to their divorce in 1977. He then married Camille Butler, his secretary. Their six-year marriage was described by The Connecticut Mirror as "tumultuous", and it ended in divorce. His third marriage, to Claudia Testa Ingram, lasted from 1984 until Weicker's death, at Middlesex Hospital in Middletown, Connecticut, on June 28, 2023, at age 92. Weicker is interred at the Putnam Cemetery in Greenwich, Connecticut. By the time of his death, he was the last living former member of the Senate Watergate Committee.

== See also ==
- List of United States governors born outside the United States
- Profile in Courage Award
- Rockefeller Republican

U.S. House of Representatives
Preceded by Donald J. Irwin	Member of the U.S. House of Representatives from Connecticut's 4th congressional district 1969–1971	Succeeded by Stewart McKinney
Party political offices
Preceded by John Davis Lodge	Republican nominee for U.S. Senator from Connecticut (Class 1); 1970, 1976, 1982, 1988	Succeeded by Jerry Labriola
New political party	A Connecticut Party nominee for Governor of Connecticut; 1990	Succeeded by Eunice Groark
U.S. Senate
Preceded by Thomas J. Dodd	U.S. Senator (Class 1) from Connecticut; 1971–1989; Served alongside: Abraham Ribicoff, Chris Dodd	Succeeded by Joe Lieberman
Preceded by Jacob Javits	Ranking Member of the Senate Small Business Committee; 1977–1981	Succeeded by Sam Nunn
Preceded by Gaylord Nelson	Chair of the Senate Small Business Committee; 1981–1987	Succeeded by Dale Bumpers
Preceded by Dale Bumpers	Ranking Member of the Senate Small Business Committee; 1987–1989	Succeeded by Rudy Boschwitz
Political offices
Preceded by William O'Neill	Governor of Connecticut; 1991–1995	Succeeded by John G. Rowland
