= Gao Zhan (alleged spy) =

Chinese computer scientist

Gao Zhan (Chinese: 高瞻) is a researcher who worked at the American University in Washington, DC. In 2001, the government of the People's Republic of China detained her for 166 days on the grounds that she was spying for Taiwan. At that time, she was widely regarded as a political dissident.

Upon her release through medical parole, she was scheduled to become a naturalized citizen of the United States, but the ceremony was quickly cancelled. The reason for this became apparent in late 2003, when Gao was convicted on charges of violating export regulations in selling microprocessors to the Chinese government. It was revealed that Gao had been under investigation since 2000, before she was detained in China.

After her conviction for export of controlled technology, Gao faced the possibility of deportation following her jail sentence. Upon release from prison, her deportation was effectively cancelled.
