= 1990 Connecticut gubernatorial election =

- November 6, 1990
- Turnout: 68.2% ▲
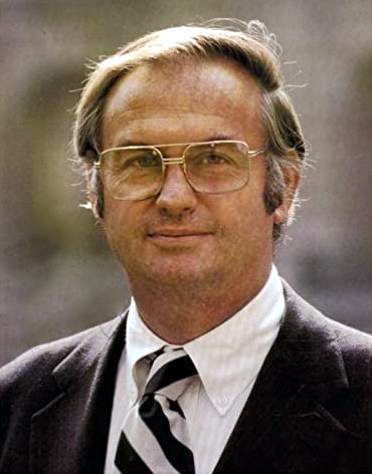

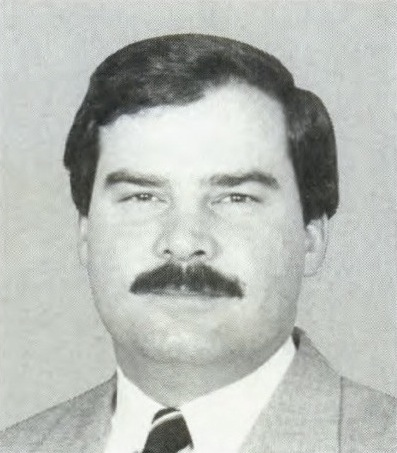

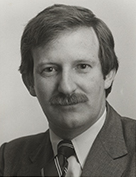
Nominee	Lowell Weicker	John G. Rowland	Bruce Morrison
Party	A Connecticut Party	Republican	Democratic
Running mate	Eunice Groark	Robert Jaekle	Sandra Bender
Popular vote	460,576	427,840	236,641
Percentage	40.36%	37.49%	20.74%
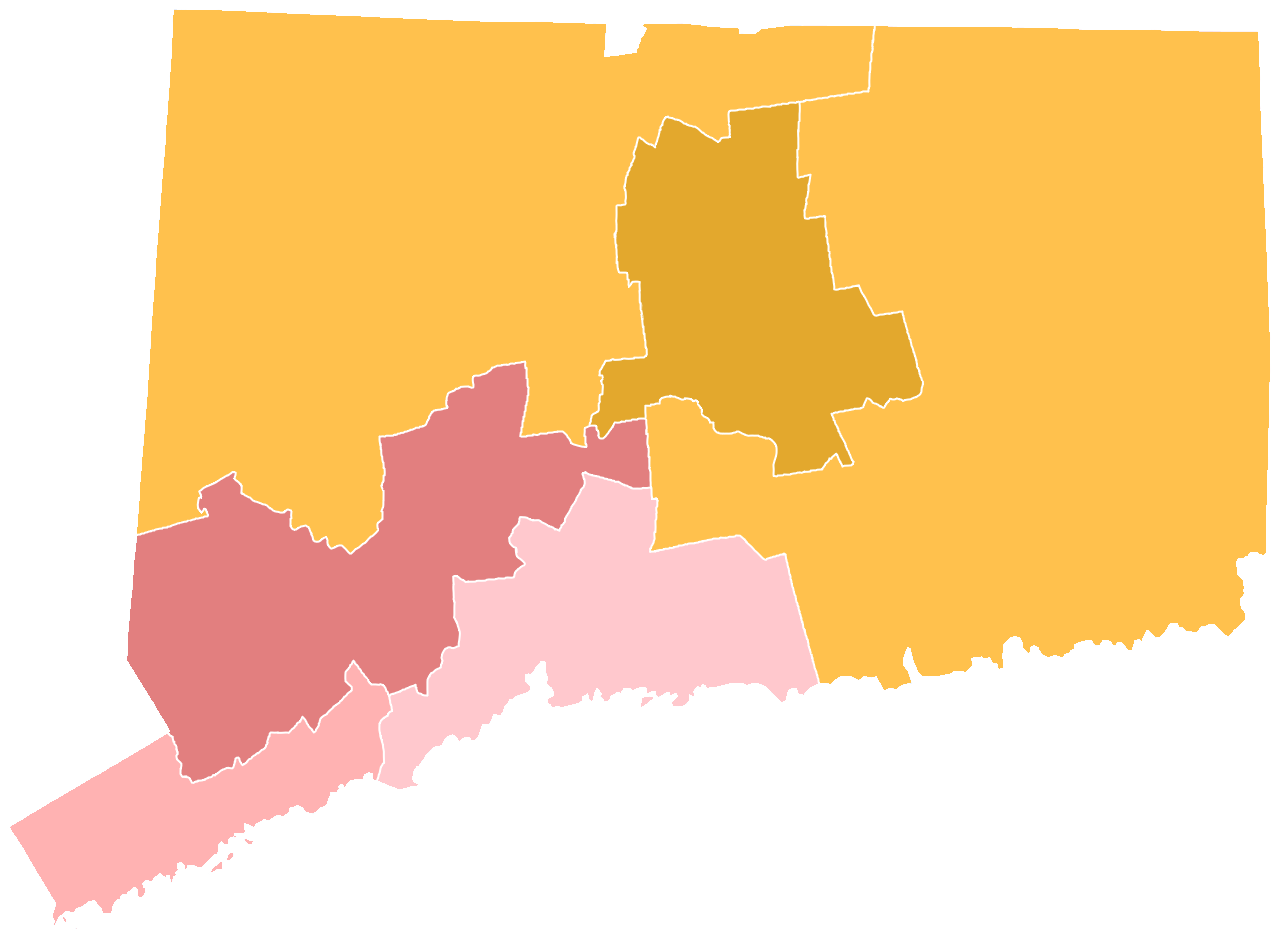
- Weicker: 30–40% 40–50% 50–60% 60–70% Rowland: 30–40% 40–50% 50–60% 60–70% Morrison: 30–40% 50–60%
Governor before election
Bill O'Neill
Democratic
Elected Governor
Lowell Weicker
A Connecticut Party

The 1990 Connecticut gubernatorial election took place on November 6, 1990, to elect the governor of Connecticut. It was a three-way race for a seat left open when Governor William A. O'Neill declined to run for re-election. A Connecticut Party nominee Lowell Weicker narrowly won the election, becoming the first candidate who was not a member of one of the two major parties to win a gubernatorial election since the 1974 election in Maine.

== Democratic primary ==
=== Candidates ===
==== Nominee ====
- Bruce A. Morrison, U.S. Representative from the 3rd congressional district.

==== Eliminated in primary ====
- William J. Cibes, state representative from the 39th district.

=== Convention ===
Democratic convention, July 14
Candidate	Round 1	
Candidate	Votes	%
Bruce A. Morrison	992	68.60%
William J. Cibes Jr.	454	31.40%
Inactive Ballots	3 ballots	

=== Primary ===
September 11, 1990 Democratic primary
Party	Candidate	Votes	%
Democratic	Bruce Morrison	84,771	64.68%
Democratic	William J. Cibes Jr.	46,294	35.32%
Total votes		131,065	100.00%

== Republican primary ==
=== Candidates ===
==== Nominee ====
- John G. Rowland, U.S. Representative from Connecticut's 5th congressional district.

==== Withdrew ====
- Reginald J. Smith, Senate minority leader from the 8th Senate district. (endorsed Weicker)
- Joel Schiavone, New Haven businessman (later became Comptroller nominee)

== General election ==
=== Candidates ===
- Bruce Morrison, U.S. Representative from the 3rd congressional district (Democratic)
- John G. Rowland, U.S. Representative from the 5th congressional district (Republican)
- Lowell Weicker, former Republican U.S. Senator (A Connecticut Party)
- Joseph Zdonczyk (Concerned Citizens)

=== Predictions ===
Source	Ranking	As of
The Cook Political Report	Lean R	October 23, 1990

=== Results ===
General election results
Party	Candidate	Votes	%
A Connecticut Party	Lowell Weicker	460,576	40.36%
Republican	John G. Rowland	427,840	37.49%
Democratic	Bruce Morrison	236,641	20.74%
Concerned Citizens	Joseph Zdonczyk	16,044	1.41%
Write-in		21	0.00%
Total votes		1,141,122	100.00%
A Connecticut Party gain from Democratic			

==== By county ====
Weicker won five of eight counties, while Rowland won the other three.

County	Lowell Weicker Republican		John G. Rowland Democratic		Bruce Morrison A Connecticut Party		Other parties Independent		Total votes cast		
County	Fairfield	86,523	31.91%	139,539	51.45%	42,266	15.59%	2,861	Total votes cast	1.05%	271,189
Hartford	152,605	50.38%	82,066	27.10%	63,656	21.02%	4,554	1.50%	302,881		
Litchfield	25,801	38.34	28,495	42.35%	11,817	17.56%	1,175	1.75%	67,288		
Middlesex	28,146	48.66%	17,279	29.87%	11,805	20.41%	610	1.05%	57,840		
New Haven	90,977	32.23	111,999	39.68%	74,854	26.52%	4,444	1.57%	282,274		
New London	37,759	46.81%	25,825	32.02%	15,805	19.60%	1,268	1.57%	80,657		
Tolland	23,425	51.26%	13,232	28.96%	8,402	18.39%	636	1.39%	45,695		
Windham	15,340	46.10%	9,405	28.26%	8,036	24.15%	496	1.49%	33,277		
Total	460,576	40.36%	427,840	37.49%	236,641	20.74%	16,065 (Note: 21 write-in votes were not listed to a specific county)	1.41%	1,141,122		

=== By congressional district ===
Weicker and Rowland each won three out of the six congressional districts. Outgoing Representative Bruce Morrison lost his congressional district to fellow outgoing Representative John Rowland, who won his and Morrison's congressional districts.

District	Weicker	Rowland	Morrison	Representative
1st	52%	25%	22%	Barbara Kennelly
2nd	48%	30%	20%	Sam Gejdenson
3rd	33%	35%	31%	Bruce Morrison (101st Congress)
3rd	33%	35%	31%	Rosa DeLauro (102nd Congress)
4th	35%	48%	16%	Chris Shays
5th	29%	53%	16%	John G. Rowland (101st Congress)
5th	29%	53%	16%	Gary Franks (102nd Congress)
6th	43%	36%	18%	Nancy Johnson
