= Thomas J. Dodd =

American prosecutor and legislator

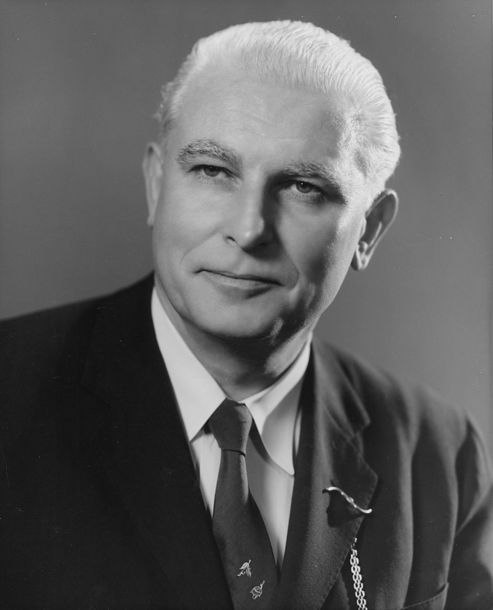

United States Senator from Connecticut
- In office January 3, 1959 – January 3, 1971
- Preceded by: William Purtell
- Succeeded by: Lowell Weicker

Member of the U.S. House of Representatives from Connecticut's 1st district
- In office January 3, 1953 – January 3, 1957
- Preceded by: Abraham A. Ribicoff
- Succeeded by: Edwin H. May Jr.

Personal details
- Born: Thomas Joseph Dodd; May 15, 1907 Norwich, Connecticut, U.S.
- Died: May 24, 1971 (aged 64) Old Lyme, Connecticut, U.S.
- Party: Democratic
- Spouse: Grace Murphy
- Children: 6, including Chris and Thomas
- Relatives: Helena Foulkes (granddaughter)
- Education: Providence College (BA); Yale University (LLB)

Thomas Joseph Dodd (May 15, 1907 – May 24, 1971) was an American attorney and diplomat who served as a United States senator and representative from Connecticut.

Dodd came from a political family; his father Thomas Joseph Dodd was a delegate to the 1936 Democratic National Convention. Dodd worked under Robert H. Jackson in the Nuremberg trials prosecuting Nazi war criminals following World War II.

Dodd served in the House of Representatives from 1953 to 1957. He lost a Senate election in 1956 to incumbent Senator Prescott S. Bush. Dodd defeated Connecticut's other incumbent Senator William Purtell in 1958. Dodd was re-elected in 1964. In 1967 he was censured in the Senate's first modern ethics case since Joseph McCarthy. Dodd lost reelection in 1970 to Lowell Weicker.

Dodd was the father of Christopher Dodd, who served in the Senate from 1981 to 2011, and Thomas J. Dodd Jr., who was a U.S. ambassador from 1993 to 2001.

== Early life ==
Dodd was born in Norwich, New London County, Connecticut, to Abigail Margaret (née O'Sullivan) and Thomas Joseph Dodd, a building contractor; all four of his grandparents were immigrants from Ireland. His paternal grandparents were farmers in the Housatonic River valley with large commercial tobacco leaf farms located near Kent and New Milford. His father would serve as a delegate to the 1936 Democratic National Convention.

Dodd graduated from Saint Anselm College's preparatory school, run by Benedictine monks in Goffstown, New Hampshire, in 1926. He graduated from Providence College in 1930 with a degree in philosophy, and from Yale Law School in 1933. In 1934, Dodd married Grace Murphy of Westerly, Rhode Island. They had six children.

He served as a special agent for the Federal Bureau of Investigation in 1933 and 1934, the highlight of his career there being his participation in an unsuccessful attempt to capture John Dillinger at Little Bohemia Lodge. He was then Connecticut director of the National Youth Administration from 1935 to 1938. He was assistant to five successive United States Attorneys General (Homer Cummings, Frank Murphy, Robert Jackson, Francis Biddle and Tom Clark) from 1938 to 1945.

As a special agent for the Attorney General, Dodd was basically a trial-level federal prosecutor. He worked primarily on criminal and civil liberties cases, including the prosecution of the Ku Klux Klan in the 1930s. In 1942, he was sent to Hartford to prosecute a major spy ring case in which five men (Anastasy Vonsiatsky, Wilhelm Kunze, and others) were accused of violating the Espionage Act of 1917 by conspiring to gather and deliver US Army, Navy, and defense information to Germany or Japan. Four of the five pleaded guilty; Dodd tried and won the conviction of the fifth man, Reverend Kurt Emil Bruno Molzahn.

Dodd became vice chairman of the Board of Review and later executive trial counsel for the Office of the United States Chief of Counsel for the Prosecution of Axis Criminality at Nuremberg, Germany, in 1945 and 1946. He practiced law privately in Hartford, Connecticut, from 1947 to 1953.

== Nuremberg trials ==
Both Supreme Court Justice Robert H. Jackson, chief prosecutor for the U.S., and Dodd insisted upon a fair and legal trial to prosecute the Nazi war criminals. Dodd accepted Jackson's offer to join him in Germany. Dodd expected the position to last only several months, but he wound up spending 15 months there. Dodd suggested Heidelberg as the location for the International Military Tribunal, since it had survived the war almost completely unscathed, but Nuremberg was eventually chosen. In October 1945, Jackson named Dodd to his senior Trial Board for the Nuremberg Trials, and later in 1946, named him Executive Trial Counsel, putting him in the number-two position at the trials. In the summer of 1946, Jackson appointed Dodd as the acting Chief of Counsel while he returned to DC. Dodd finally returned to the U.S. in October 1946. He described the delegation as "an autopsy on history's most horrible catalogue of human crime."

Dodd cross-examined defendants Wilhelm Keitel, Alfred Rosenberg, Hans Frank, Walther Funk, Baldur von Schirach, Fritz Sauckel and Arthur Seyss-Inquart. In addition to cross-examining, Dodd drafted indictments against the defendants, showed films of concentration camps, provided evidence of slave labor programs, and presented evidence of economic preparations by the Nazis for an aggressive war.

Through his evidence, Dodd showed that Erich Koch, the Reichskommissar for Ukraine, and defendant Hans Frank, the head “General Government for the occupied former Polish territories”, were responsible for the plan to deport one million Poles for slave labor. He also showed evidence that defendant Walther Funk turned the Reichsbank into a depository for gold teeth and other valuables seized from the concentration camp victims. Dodd showed a motion picture of the vaults in Frankfurt where Allied troops found cases of these valuables, containing dentures, earrings, silverware and candelabra. He showed many items of evidence, such as a shrunken, stuffed and preserved human head of one of the concentration camp victims that had been used as a paperweight by the commandant of Buchenwald Concentration Camp.

Final pleas were made on August 31, 1946, and the Tribunal announced its judgment on October 1, 1946. Dodd assisted the Allied prosecuting team in convicting all but three of the defendants. All but one of the defendants had claimed innocence, including Hermann Göring, whom Dodd had charged with ordering Reinhard Heydrich to set the Holocaust in motion. In addition to prosecuting the individual defendants, Dodd demanded in his summation to the Tribunal that all six of the indicted Nazi organizations be convicted of crimes against humanity, on the same grounds of the crimes against humanity ascribed to the individual defendants. These six organizations were the Leadership Corps of the Nazi Party, the Reich Cabinet, the Gestapo, the Storm Troopers (SA), the Armed Forces, and the Elite Guard (SS). Dodd said that these organizations should not escape liability on the grounds that they were too large, part of a political party, etc.

Dodd was given several awards in recognition of his work at the Nuremberg trials. Jackson awarded him the Medal of Freedom in July 1946 and President Harry Truman awarded him the Certificate of Merit, which Jackson personally delivered to him in Hartford in the fall of 1946. Dodd also received the Czechoslovak Order of the White Lion. In 1949, the Polish government had intended to award Dodd with a badge of honor called the Officer's Cross of the Order of Polonia Restituta, but Dodd rejected the medal due to his commitment to human rights and views that the Polish government was imposing a tyranny similar to that imposed by the Nazis, and accepting an honor from the President of Poland would be like accepting one from the Nazis.

== Congress ==
Dodd was elected as a Democrat to the House of Representatives in 1952 and served two terms. He lost a Senate election in 1956 to Prescott S. Bush but was elected in 1958 to Connecticut's other Senate seat and then re-elected in 1964.

Before becoming a U.S. senator, Dodd was hired to lobby for Guatemala in the United States for $50,000 a year by the dictator Carlos Castillo Armas. According to the North American Congress on Latin America, Dodd "had perhaps the coziest relationship with the Castillo Armas government." After a short trip to Guatemala in 1955, Dodd urged the House of Representatives to increase aid to the country in Central America. Dodd's amendment passed and Guatemala received $15 million of U.S. aid in 1956. Dodd was unapologetic when criticized for his lobbying efforts on behalf of the Guatemalan dictatorship. When a Republican organizer challenged Dodd on his lobbying, Dodd stated, "I am a practicing attorney and I am proud of the fact that the anti-communist government of Guatemala has asked me to handle its legal affairs in the U.S. Of course I will not represent the government of Guatemala or any other private client if I am elected to the Senate."

In 1961, Dodd visited the Congo to investigate the civil war caused by the secession of the Province of Katanga.

In addition to his work in the Congo, Dodd opened what became nearly three years of intermittent hearings. The results of the three committee staff monitoring reports of television content in 1954, 1961, and 1964 showed incidents of violence. Senator Dodd and Estes Kefauver were the two men responsible for reports making claims of the effects of television violence on “juveniles”.

In 1964, Dodd was locked in a somewhat bitter and tough re-election bid against popular former Governor John Davis Lodge, the younger brother of the Ambassador to South Vietnam and former U.S. Senator Henry Cabot Lodge Jr., who had just won a series of Republican presidential primaries, starting with New Hampshire earlier that year without campaigning but on the strength of the Lodge family name alone. Worried that this respectful allure might empower John Lodge, Dodd reached out to President Lyndon B. Johnson for assistance. Johnson had been keeping his choice of running mate secret and so on the Wednesday of the Democratic National Convention, before the evening on which the running mate would be announced, Johnson summoned both Dodd and his colleague, whom Johnson had chosen to be his running mate, Senator Hubert H. Humphrey of Minnesota, to the White House. While Dodd was never seriously considered as a running mate, the ensuing summons by the President added a lot of suspense and free press to Dodd, who successfully used it to raise his name and record before the voters. It also allowed Johnson that much more excitement in naming a running mate, a choice that had come down in the press and public opinion between Humphrey and Minnesota's other senator, the urbane Eugene McCarthy.

Aided in part by Johnson, who enthusiastically endorsed Dodd on a campaign swing through Connecticut later and then Johnson's subsequent landslide over Arizona Senator Barry Goldwater, who seized the Republican presidential nomination from Lodge's brother and a number of other establishment Republicans, Dodd won his own landslide over the younger Lodge by 30%, thereby shuttering the younger Lodge's nascent political career.

In the fall of 1965, Dodd tried to get Martin Luther King Jr. arrested for violating the never-successfully used Logan Act of 1799, claiming that King's public stance against the Vietnam War was a felony per the Logan Act's intent of preventing unauthorized negotiations from undermining the government's position. Dodd also sponsored the Drug Abuse Control Amendments and was involved in problems relating to non-narcotic stimulants, depressants, and other psychotoxic drugs like hallucinogens and psychedelics.

Then, in the spring of 1966, the Senate Subcommittee on Juvenile Delinquency met to discuss the "LSD Problem" that has been becoming more prominent. Dodd spoke out against the use of psychedelic drugs because he rejected the idea that expanding consciousness was a worthwhile goal. He went on to say that it was all just an excuse to have fun with no serious benefits. Dodd proposed new strict laws to try to keep LSD away from the youth of America.

As chairman of the Senate Subcommittee on Juvenile Delinquency, Dodd worked to restrict the purchase of mail order handguns and later shotguns and rifles. Those efforts culminated in the Gun Control Act of 1968, which Dodd introduced, including certain registration requirements.

Dodd played an instrumental role in the prohibition of LSD in the United States by presiding over subcommittee hearings purportedly investigating the drug's effects on youth. Notably, the Harvard psychologist and LSD proponent Timothy Leary was called to testify. Although Leary urged lawmakers to enact a strictly regulated framework in which LSD would remain legal, Dodd and his colleagues drafted a ban which was later adopted. That event was one episode in the prelude towards an all-out "war on drugs" in the 1970s.

== Senate censure and loss of office ==
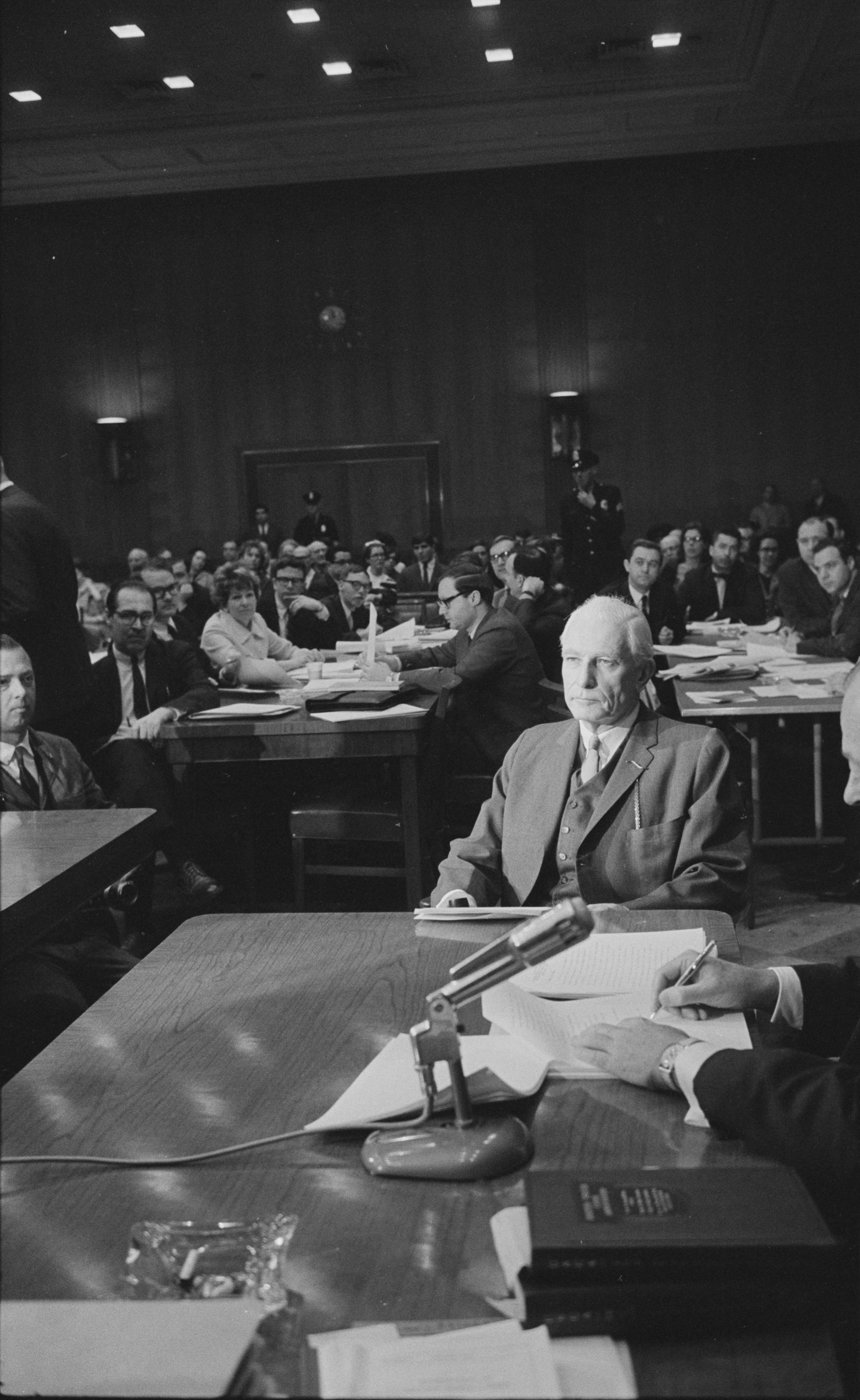
Thomas J. Dodd at his hearing before the Senate Select Committee on Standards and Conduct

In 1967 Dodd became the first Senator censured by the US Senate since Joseph McCarthy in 1954, and was one of only six people censured by the Senate in the 20th century. The censure was a condemnation and finding that he had converted campaign funds to his personal accounts and spent the money. Beyond the Senate Ethics Committee's formal disciplinary action, other sources (such as investigative journalist Drew Pearson and Jack Anderson's Congress in Crisis) suggest Dodd's corruption was far broader in scope, and there were accusations of alcoholism. In response to these accusations, Dodd filed a lawsuit against Pearson claiming that Pearson had illegally interfered with his private property. Although the district court granted a partial judgment to Dodd, the appellate court ruled in favor of Pearson on the grounds that Dodd's property had not been physically abused.

In 1970, the Democrats endorsed Joseph Duffey for his seat, who won the nomination in the primary. Dodd then entered the race as an independent, taking just under a quarter of the vote, in a three-way race which he and Duffey lost to Republican Lowell Weicker. Dodd finished third, with 266,500 votes–far exceeding Weicker's 86,600-vote margin over Duffey.

== Death and legacy ==
Months after his defeat, Dodd died of a heart attack at his home in Old Lyme, New London County, Connecticut. His son Christopher Dodd was elected to the Senate from Connecticut as a Democrat in 1980. Another son, Thomas J. Dodd Jr. was the US Ambassador to Uruguay under President Bill Clinton and US Ambassador to Costa Rica under Presidents Clinton and George W. Bush. His granddaughter, Helena Buonanno Foulkes, is the Democratic nominee to be the Governor of Rhode Island in the 2026 election.

Thomas J. Dodd Memorial Stadium in Norwich was named in his honor.

In 1995, the Thomas J. Dodd Research Center was established at the University of Connecticut. The Center houses the Human Rights Institute, Archives & Special Collections at the University of Connecticut Library, and the Center for Judaic Studies at the University of Connecticut. Presidents Bill Clinton and Joe Biden have visited the Dodd Center during their terms.

In 2003, the University of Connecticut established the Thomas J. Dodd Prize in International Justice and Human Rights.

The state of New Hampshire proclaimed April 25, 2008, as Thomas J. Dodd Day; that same day, the New Hampshire Institute of Politics at Saint Anselm College renamed its Center for International Affairs as the Senator Thomas J. Dodd Center for the Study of International Affairs and Law. The center seeks to promote understanding of the forces that drive politics and the political economy in the global world; to sensitize students to the cultures of other countries, and to spur interest in the needs and problems of other nations and countries.

== In popular culture ==
He has been portrayed by the following actors in film, television and theater productions;

- Hrothgar Mathews in the 2000 Canadian/U.S. television miniseries Nuremberg.
- Rupert Vansittart in the 2006 British television docudrama Nuremberg: Nazis on Trial.
- Protest singer Phil Ochs references Dodd in his song "Draft Dodger Rag": "I believe in God and Senator Dodd and keeping old Castro down."

== See also ==
- List of United States senators expelled or censured
- List of federal political scandals in the United States

U.S. House of Representatives
Preceded by Abraham Ribicoff	Member of the U.S. House of Representatives from Connecticut's 1st congressional district 1953–1957	Succeeded by Edwin H. May Jr.
Party political offices
Preceded by Abraham Ribicoff	Democratic nominee for U.S. Senator from Connecticut (Class 3); 1956	Succeeded by Abraham Ribicoff
Preceded by William Benton	Democratic nominee for U.S. Senator from Connecticut (Class 1); 1958, 1964	Succeeded by Joseph Duffey
U.S. Senate
Preceded by William A. Purtell	U.S. Senator (Class 1) from Connecticut; 1959–1971; Served alongside: Prescott Bush, Abraham Ribicoff	Succeeded by Lowell Weicker
